= List of weightlifters at the 2016 Summer Olympics =

This is the list of the weightlifters who competed at the 2016 Summer Olympics in Rio de Janeiro, Brazil from August 5–21, 2016. 260 weightlifters participated at the Games across fifteen events.

== Male weightlifters ==
NOC	Name	Age	Hometown	Events
Albania	Briken Calja	February 19, 1990 (aged 26)	(Albania) Elbasan	Men's 69 kg
Algeria	Walid Bidani	June 11, 1994 (aged 22)	(Algeria) Maghnia	Men's +105 kg
American Samoa	Tanumafili Jungblut	June 10, 1990 (aged 26)	(American Samoa)	Men's 94 kg
Armenia	Andranik Karapetyan	December 15, 1995 (aged 20)	(Armenia) Vagharshapat	Men's 77 kg
Armenia	Arakel Mirzoyan	October 21, 1989 (aged 26)	(Armenia) Baghramyan	Men's 85 kg
Armenia	Simon Martirosyan	February 17, 1997 (aged 19)	(Armenia) Haykashen	Men's 105 kg
Armenia	Ruben Aleksanyan	March 14, 1990 (aged 26)	(Armenia)	Men's +105 kg
Armenia	Gor Minasyan	October 24, 1994 (aged 21)	(Armenia)	Men's +105 kg
Australia	Simplice Ribouem	December 5, 1982 (aged 33)	(Australia)	Men's 94 kg
Austria	Sargis Martirosjan	September 14, 1986 (aged 29)	(Austria)	Men's 105 kg
Belarus	Stanislau Chadovich	August 24, 1992 (aged 23)	(Belarus) Mogilev	Men's 62 kg
Belarus	Petr Asayonak	February 27, 1993 (aged 23)	(Belarus)	Men's 85 kg
Belarus	Pavel Khadasevich	July 16, 1993 (aged 23)	(Belarus)	Men's 85 kg
Belarus	Aliaksandr Bersanau	September 1, 1992 (aged 23)	(Belarus)	Men's 94 kg
Belarus	Vadzim Straltsou	April 30, 1986 (aged 30)	(Belarus) Mogilev	Men's 94 kg
Brazil	Welisson Silva	November 22, 1993 (aged 22)	(Brazil) (Minas Gerais) Viçosa	Men's 85 kg
Brazil	Mateus Gregório	July 5, 1993 (aged 23)	(Brazil)	Men's 105 kg
Brazil	Fernando Reis	March 10, 1990 (aged 26)	(Brazil) (São Paulo (state)) São Paulo	Men's +105 kg
Cameroon	Petit Minkoumba	February 27, 1989 (aged 27)	(Cameroon)	Men's 94 kg
Canada	Pascal Plamondon	December 12, 1992 (aged 23)	(Canada) (Quebec) Sherbrooke	Men's 85 kg
Chile	Julio Acosta	July 22, 1987 (aged 29)	(Chile)	Men's 62 kg
China	Long Qingquan	December 3, 1990 (aged 25)	(China) Longshan	Men's 56 kg
China	Chen Lijun	February 8, 1993 (aged 23)	(China) Yiyang	Men's 62 kg
China	Shi Zhiyong	October 10, 1993 (aged 22)	(China) Longyan	Men's 69 kg
China	Lü Xiaojun	July 27, 1984 (aged 32)	(China) Qianjiang	Men's 77 kg
China	Tian Tao	April 8, 1994 (aged 22)	(China) Changyang	Men's 85 kg
China	Yang Zhe	July 7, 1991 (aged 25)	(China)	Men's 105 kg
Chinese Taipei	Tan Chi-chung	February 24, 1990 (aged 26)	(Chinese Taipei)	Men's 56 kg
Chinese Taipei	Pan Chien-hung	August 7, 1988 (aged 27)	(Chinese Taipei)	Men's 69 kg
Chinese Taipei	Chen Shih-chieh	November 27, 1989 (aged 26)	(Chinese Taipei) Pingtung	Men's +105 kg
Colombia	Habib de las Salas	April 19, 1987 (aged 29)	(Colombia)	Men's 56 kg
Colombia	Oscar Figueroa	April 27, 1983 (aged 33)	(Colombia) Zaragoza	Men's 62 kg
Colombia	Francisco Mosquera	April 1, 1992 (aged 24)	(Colombia)	Men's 62 kg
Colombia	Luis Javier Mosquera	March 27, 1995 (aged 21)	(Colombia)	Men's 69 kg
Colombia	Andres Caicedo	May 8, 1997 (aged 19)	(Colombia)	Men's 77 kg
Cuba	Yoelmis Hernández	April 25, 1986 (aged 30)	(Cuba) Nueva Gerona	Men's 85 kg
Cyprus	Antonis Martasidis	June 14, 1992 (aged 24)	(Cyprus)	Men's 85 kg
Czech Republic	Jiří Orság	January 5, 1989 (aged 27)	(Czech Republic) Znojmo	Men's +105 kg
Dominican Republic	Luis García	April 19, 1995 (aged 21)	(Dominican Republic)	Men's 56 kg
Ecuador	Fernando Salas	February 10, 1988 (aged 28)	(Ecuador)	Men's +105 kg
Egypt	Ahmed Saad	November 1, 1986 (aged 29)	(Egypt) Al-Fayoum	Men's 62 kg
Egypt	Mohamed Ihab	November 21, 1989 (aged 26)	(Egypt)	Men's 77 kg
Egypt	Tarek Yehia	May 18, 1987 (aged 29)	(Egypt)	Men's 85 kg
Egypt	Ragab Abdelhay	March 4, 1991 (aged 25)	(Egypt)	Men's 94 kg
Egypt	Gaber Mohamed	September 1, 1985 (aged 30)	(Egypt)	Men's 105 kg
Egypt	Ahmed Mohamed	April 27, 1988 (aged 28)	(Egypt)	Men's +105 kg
Estonia	Mart Seim	October 24, 1990 (aged 25)	(Estonia)	Men's +105 kg
Fiji	Manueli Tulo	March 25, 1990 (aged 26)	(Fiji) Levuka	Men's 56 kg
Finland	Milko Tokola	October 10, 1992 (aged 23)	(Finland) Rovaniemi	Men's 85 kg
France	Bernardin Matam	May 20, 1990 (aged 26)	(France) Besançon	Men's 69 kg
France	Giovanni Bardis	May 21, 1987 (aged 29)	(France)	Men's 85 kg
France	Benjamin Hennequin	August 24, 1984 (aged 31)	(France)	Men's 85 kg
France	Kévin Bouly	April 26, 1981 (aged 35)	(France)	Men's 94 kg
Georgia	Rauli Tsirekidze	May 24, 1987 (aged 29)	(Georgia (country)) Kutaisi	Men's 94 kg
Georgia	Lasha Talakhadze	October 2, 1993 (aged 22)	(Georgia (country))	Men's +105 kg
Georgia	Irakli Turmanidze	December 13, 1984 (aged 31)	(Georgia (country)) Kobuleti	Men's +105 kg
Germany	Nico Müller	November 2, 1993 (aged 22)	(Germany)	Men's 77 kg
Germany	Jürgen Spieß	March 26, 1984 (aged 32)	(Germany) Heidelberg	Men's 105 kg
Germany	Alexej Prochorow	March 30, 1990 (aged 26)	(Germany)	Men's +105 kg
Germany	Almir Velagić	August 22, 1981 (aged 34)	(Germany)	Men's +105 kg
Ghana	Christian Amoah	July 25, 1999 (aged 17)	(Ghana)	Men's 85 kg
Great Britain	Sonny Webster	March 10, 1994 (aged 22)	(United Kingdom) High Wycombe	Men's 94 kg
Greece	Theodoros Iakovidis	February 12, 1991 (aged 25)	(Greece)	Men's 85 kg
Guatemala	Edgar Pineda	August 17, 1997 (aged 18)	(Guatemala)	Men's 56 kg
Haiti	Edouard Joseph	December 24, 1989 (aged 26)	(Haiti)	Men's 62 kg
Honduras	Cristopher Pavón	April 18, 1993 (aged 23)	(Honduras) El Progreso	Men's 94 kg
Hungary	Péter Nagy	January 16, 1986 (aged 30)	(Hungary) Komárom	Men's +105 kg
India	Sathish Sivalingam	June 23, 1992 (aged 24)	(India) Vellore	Men's 77 kg
Indonesia	Eko Yuli Irawan	July 24, 1989 (aged 27)	(Indonesia) Lampung	Men's 62 kg
Indonesia	Muhammad Hasbi	July 12, 1992 (aged 24)	(Indonesia)	Men's 62 kg
Indonesia	Deni	July 26, 1989 (aged 27)	(Indonesia)	Men's 69 kg
Indonesia	Triyatno	December 20, 1987 (aged 28)	(Indonesia) Metro	Men's 69 kg
Indonesia	I Ketut Ariana	September 6, 1989 (aged 26)	(Indonesia)	Men's 77 kg
Iran	Kianoush Rostami	July 23, 1991 (aged 25)	(Iran) Eslamabad-e Gharb	Men's 85 kg
Iran	Ali Hashemi	November 1, 1991 (aged 24)	(Iran) Ilam	Men's 94 kg
Iran	Sohrab Moradi	September 22, 1988 (aged 27)	(Iran) Lenjan	Men's 94 kg
Iran	Mohammad Reza Barari	March 31, 1988 (aged 28)	(Iran) Sari	Men's 105 kg
Iran	Behdad Salimi	December 8, 1989 (aged 26)	(Iran) Qaem Shahr	Men's +105 kg
Iraq	Salwan Jassim Abbood	September 26, 1991 (aged 24)	(Iraq)	Men's 105 kg
Israel	Igor Olshanetskyi	February 16, 1986 (aged 30)	(Israel)	Men's +105 kg
Italy	Mirco Scarantino	January 16, 1995 (aged 21)	(Italy)	Men's 56 kg
Japan	Hiroaki Takao	January 2, 1992 (aged 24)	(Japan)	Men's 56 kg
Japan	Yōichi Itokazu	May 24, 1991 (aged 25)	(Japan)	Men's 62 kg
Japan	Yōsuke Nakayama	March 20, 1987 (aged 29)	(Japan)	Men's 62 kg
Kazakhstan	Arli Chontey	July 1, 1992 (aged 24)	(Kazakhstan)	Men's 56 kg
Kazakhstan	Farkhad Kharki	April 20, 1991 (aged 25)	(Kazakhstan)	Men's 62 kg
Kazakhstan	Nijat Rahimov	August 13, 1993 (aged 22)	(Azerbaijan) Baku	Men's 77 kg
Kazakhstan	Denis Ulanov	October 28, 1993 (aged 22)	(Kazakhstan)	Men's 85 kg
Kazakhstan	Alexandr Zaichikov	August 17, 1992 (aged 23)	(Kazakhstan)	Men's 105 kg
Kenya	James Adede	October 31, 1986 (aged 29)	(Kenya)	Men's 94 kg
Kiribati	David Katoatau	July 17, 1984 (aged 32)	(Kiribati) Nonouti	Men's 105 kg
Kyrgyzstan	Izzat Artykov	September 8, 1993 (aged 22)	(Kyrgyzstan)	Men's 69 kg
Latvia	Artūrs Plēsnieks	January 21, 1992 (aged 24)	(Latvia) Kroņauce	Men's 105 kg
Lithuania	Aurimas Didžbalis	June 13, 1991 (aged 25)	(Lithuania)	Men's 94 kg
Malaysia	Mohd Hafifi Mansor	October 28, 1990 (aged 25)	(Malaysia)	Men's 69 kg
Malta	Kyle Micallef	January 8, 1987 (aged 29)	(Malta)	Men's 85 kg
Mexico	Bredni Roque	November 11, 1987 (aged 28)	(Mexico)	Men's 69 kg
Moldova	Serghei Cechir	October 15, 1990 (aged 25)	(Moldova)	Men's 69 kg
Moldova	Alexandru Șpac	November 21, 1989 (aged 26)	(Moldova)	Men's 77 kg
Morocco	Khalid El-Aabidi	September 14, 1995 (aged 20)	(Morocco)	Men's 85 kg
Nauru	Elson Brechtefeld	March 2, 1994 (aged 22)	(Nauru)	Men's 56 kg
New Zealand	Richie Patterson	April 30, 1983 (aged 33)	(New Zealand) Auckland	Men's 85 kg
North Korea	Om Yun-chol	November 18, 1991 (aged 24)	(North Korea) North Hamgyong	Men's 56 kg
North Korea	Kim Myong-hyok	December 3, 1990 (aged 25)	(North Korea)	Men's 69 kg
North Korea	Kwon Yong-gwang	January 14, 1996 (aged 20)	(North Korea)	Men's 69 kg
North Korea	Choe Jon-wi	June 29, 1993 (aged 23)	(North Korea)	Men's 77 kg
Papua New Guinea	Morea Baru	April 15, 1990 (aged 26)	(Papua New Guinea)	Men's 62 kg
Peru	Junior Lahuanampa	April 5, 1995 (aged 21)	(Peru)	Men's 69 kg
Philippines	Nestor Colonia	February 16, 1992 (aged 24)	(Philippines) Zamboanga City	Men's 56 kg
Poland	Adrian Zieliński	March 28, 1989 (aged 27)	(Poland) Nakło nad Notecią	Men's 94 kg
Poland	Tomasz Zieliński	October 29, 1990 (aged 25)	(Poland) Nakło nad Notecią	Men's 94 kg
Poland	Bartłomiej Bonk	October 11, 1984 (aged 31)	(Poland) Więcbork	Men's 105 kg
Poland	Arkadiusz Michalski	January 7, 1990 (aged 26)	(Poland)	Men's 105 kg
Qatar	Faris Ibrahim	June 4, 1998 (aged 18)	(Qatar)	Men's 85 kg
Romania	Dumitru Captari	July 12, 1989 (aged 27)	(Romania)	Men's 77 kg
Romania	Gabriel Sîncrăian	December 21, 1988 (aged 27)	(Romania) Cluj-Napoca	Men's 85 kg
Samoa	Vaipava Ioane	April 14, 1988 (aged 28)	(Samoa)	Men's 62 kg
Saudi Arabia	Mohammed Hussein Dhilib	May 1, 1994 (aged 22)	(Saudi Arabia)	Men's 69 kg
Seychelles	Rick Confiance	May 24, 1994 (aged 22)	(Seychelles)	Men's 62 kg
Slovakia	Ondrej Krúžel	August 23, 1988 (aged 27)	(Slovakia)	Men's +105 kg
South Korea	Han Myeong-mok	February 1, 1991 (aged 25)	(South Korea)	Men's 62 kg
South Korea	Won Jeong-sik	December 9, 1990 (aged 25)	(South Korea)	Men's 69 kg
South Korea	Yu Dong-ju	August 19, 1993 (aged 22)	(South Korea)	Men's 85 kg
South Korea	Park Han-woong	January 15, 1995 (aged 21)	(South Korea)	Men's 94 kg
Spain	Josué Brachi	September 8, 1992 (aged 23)	(Spain)	Men's 56 kg
Spain	David Sánchez	July 20, 1994 (aged 22)	(Spain)	Men's 69 kg
Spain	Andrés Mata	November 11, 1992 (aged 23)	(Spain)	Men's 77 kg
Sri Lanka	Sudesh Peiris	February 3, 1985 (aged 31)	(Sri Lanka) Sandalankawa	Men's 62 kg
Syria	Man Asaad	November 20, 1993 (aged 22)	(Syria)	Men's +105 kg
Thailand	Sinphet Kruaithong	August 22, 1995 (aged 20)	(Thailand)	Men's 56 kg
Thailand	Witoon Mingmoon	February 10, 1996 (aged 20)	(Thailand)	Men's 56 kg
Thailand	Tairat Bunsuk	January 11, 1993 (aged 23)	(Thailand)	Men's 69 kg
Thailand	Chatuphum Chinnawong	July 19, 1993 (aged 23)	(Thailand) Nakhon Ratchasima	Men's 77 kg
Thailand	Sarat Sumpradit	April 17, 1994 (aged 22)	(Thailand)	Men's 94 kg
Tunisia	Karem Ben Hnia	November 13, 1994 (aged 21)	(Tunisia)	Men's 69 kg
Turkey	Daniyar Ismayilov	February 3, 1992 (aged 24)	(Turkey)	Men's 69 kg
Turkmenistan	Hojamuhammet Toychiyev	January 16, 1992 (aged 24)	(Turkmenistan)	Men's +105 kg
Ukraine	Oleksandr Pielieshenko	January 7, 1994 (aged 22)	(Ukraine)	Men's 85 kg
Ukraine	Dmytro Chumak	July 11, 1990 (aged 26)	(Ukraine)	Men's 94 kg
Ukraine	Volodymyr Hoza	April 15, 1996 (aged 20)	(Ukraine)	Men's 94 kg
Ukraine	Ihor Shymechko	May 27, 1986 (aged 30)	(Ukraine)	Men's +105 kg
United States	Kendrick Farris	July 2, 1986 (aged 30)	(United States) (Louisiana) Shreveport	Men's 94 kg
Uzbekistan	Doston Yokubov	April 5, 1995 (aged 21)	(Uzbekistan)	Men's 69 kg
Uzbekistan	Ivan Efremov	March 9, 1986 (aged 30)	(Uzbekistan) Tashkent	Men's 105 kg
Uzbekistan	Ruslan Nurudinov	November 24, 1991 (aged 24)	(Uzbekistan) Andijan	Men's 105 kg
Uzbekistan	Rustam Djangabaev	August 25, 1993 (aged 22)	(Uzbekistan)	Men's +105 kg
Uzbekistan	Sardorbek Dustmurotov	March 13, 1993 (aged 23)	(Uzbekistan)	Men's +105 kg
Venezuela	Jesús López	December 17, 1984 (aged 31)	(Venezuela)	Men's 62 kg
Vietnam	Thạch Kim Tuấn	January 15, 1994 (aged 22)	(Vietnam) Bình Thuận	Men's 56 kg
Vietnam	Trần Lê Quốc Toàn	April 5, 1989 (aged 27)	(Vietnam) Đà Nẵng	Men's 56 kg
Vietnam	Hoàng Tuấn Tài	March 30, 1990 (aged 26)	(Vietnam)	Men's 85 kg

== Female weightlifters ==
NOC	Name	Age	Hometown	Events
Algeria	Fatima-Zohra Bouchra	August 22, 2000 (aged 15)	(Algeria)	Women's 75 kg
Argentina	Joana Palacios	November 8, 1996 (aged 19)	(Argentina)	Women's 58 kg
Armenia	Nazik Avdalyan	October 31, 1986 (aged 29)	(Armenia) Gyumri	Women's 69 kg
Armenia	Sona Poghosyan	June 29, 1998 (aged 18)	(Armenia)	Women's 75 kg
Australia	Tia-Clair Toomey	July 22, 1993 (aged 23)	(Australia)	Women's 58 kg
Belarus	Anastasiya Mikhalenka	December 8, 1995 (aged 20)	(Belarus)	Women's 69 kg
Belarus	Darya Pachabut	December 31, 1994 (aged 21)	(Belarus)	Women's 69 kg
Belarus	Darya Naumava	August 26, 1995 (aged 20)	(Belarus)	Women's 75 kg
Brazil	Rosane Santos	June 20, 1987 (aged 29)	(Brazil)	Women's 53 kg
Brazil	Jaqueline Ferreira	March 5, 1987 (aged 29)	(Brazil) (Rio de Janeiro (state)) Rio de Janeiro	Women's 75 kg
Cameroon	Arcangeline Fouodji	August 26, 1987 (aged 28)	(Cameroon)	Women's 69 kg
Canada	Marie-Ève Beauchemin-Nadeau	October 13, 1988 (aged 27)	(Canada) (Quebec) Montreal	Women's 69 kg
Chile	María Fernanda Valdés	March 17, 1992 (aged 24)	(Chile) Coquimbo	Women's 75 kg
China	Li Yajun	April 27, 1993 (aged 23)	(China)	Women's 53 kg
China	Deng Wei	February 14, 1993 (aged 23)	(China)	Women's 63 kg
China	Xiang Yanmei	June 13, 1992 (aged 24)	(China) Baojing	Women's 69 kg
China	Meng Suping	July 17, 1989 (aged 27)	(China)	Women's +75 kg
Chinese Taipei	Chen Wei-ling	January 4, 1982 (aged 34)	(Chinese Taipei) Tainan	Women's 48 kg
Chinese Taipei	Hsu Shu-ching	May 9, 1991 (aged 25)	(Chinese Taipei) Kaohsiung	Women's 53 kg
Chinese Taipei	Kuo Hsing-chun	November 26, 1993 (aged 22)	(Chinese Taipei) Yilan	Women's 58 kg
Chinese Taipei	Lin Tzu-chi	March 19, 1988 (aged 28)	(Chinese Taipei) Kaohsiung	Women's 63 kg
Colombia	Lina Rivas	April 24, 1990 (aged 26)	(Colombia)	Women's 58 kg
Colombia	Mercedes Pérez	August 7, 1987 (aged 28)	(Colombia) Santa Marta	Women's 63 kg
Colombia	Leydi Solís	February 17, 1990 (aged 26)	(Colombia) Tuluá	Women's 69 kg
Colombia	Ubaldina Valoyes	July 6, 1982 (aged 34)	(Colombia) Quidbo	Women's 75 kg
Cook Islands	Luisa Peters	June 27, 1993 (aged 23)	(Cook Islands) Rarotonga	Women's +75 kg
Cuba	Marina Rodríguez	March 2, 1995 (aged 21)	(Cuba)	Women's 63 kg
Dominican Republic	Beatriz Pirón	February 27, 1995 (aged 21)	(Dominican Republic) San Pedro de Macorís	Women's 48 kg
Dominican Republic	Yuderqui Contreras	March 27, 1986 (aged 30)	(Dominican Republic) San Pedro de Macorís	Women's 58 kg
Ecuador	Alexandra Escobar	July 17, 1980 (aged 36)	(Ecuador) Esmeraldas	Women's 58 kg
Ecuador	Neisi Dájomes	May 12, 1998 (aged 18)	(Ecuador) Shell	Women's 69 kg
Egypt	Esraa El-Sayed	November 21, 1998 (aged 17)	(Egypt)	Women's 63 kg
Egypt	Sara Ahmed	January 1, 1998 (aged 18)	(Egypt)	Women's 69 kg
Egypt	Shaimaa Khalaf	January 1, 1991 (aged 25)	(Egypt)	Women's +75 kg
Fiji	Apolonia Vaivai	February 5, 1991 (aged 25)	(Fiji) Taveuni	Women's 69 kg
Finland	Anni Vuohijoki	May 24, 1988 (aged 28)	(Finland)	Women's 63 kg
France	Gaëlle Nayo-Ketchanke	April 20, 1988 (aged 28)	(France) Clermont-l'Hérault	Women's 75 kg
Germany	Sabine Kusterer	January 4, 1991 (aged 25)	(Germany)	Women's 58 kg
Great Britain	Rebekah Tiler	January 13, 1999 (aged 17)	(United Kingdom) Todmorden	Women's 69 kg
India	Saikhom Mirabai Chanu	August 8, 1994 (aged 21)	(India) Imphal East	Women's 48 kg
Indonesia	Sri Wahyuni Agustiani	August 13, 1994 (aged 21)	(Indonesia) Bandung	Women's 48 kg
Indonesia	Dewi Safitri	February 10, 1993 (aged 23)	(Indonesia)	Women's 53 kg
Italy	Giorgia Bordignon	May 24, 1987 (aged 29)	(Italy)	Women's 63 kg
Japan	Hiromi Miyake	November 18, 1985 (aged 30)	(Japan)	Women's 48 kg
Japan	Kanae Yagi	July 16, 1992 (aged 24)	(Japan)	Women's 53 kg
Japan	Mikiko Ando	September 30, 1992 (aged 23)	(Japan)	Women's 58 kg
Japan	Namika Matsumoto	February 7, 1992 (aged 24)	(Japan)	Women's 63 kg
Kazakhstan	Margarita Yelisseyeva	July 20, 1992 (aged 24)	(Kazakhstan)	Women's 48 kg
Kazakhstan	Karina Goricheva	April 8, 1993 (aged 23)	(Kazakhstan)	Women's 63 kg
Kazakhstan	Zhazira Zhapparkul	September 30, 1992 (aged 23)	(Kazakhstan) Arys	Women's 69 kg
Kyrgyzstan	Zhanyl Okoeva	November 15, 1993 (aged 22)	(Kyrgyzstan)	Women's 48 kg
Latvia	Rebeka Koha	May 19, 1998 (aged 18)	(Latvia) Ventspils	Women's 53 kg
Madagascar	Elisa Ravololoniaina	February 24, 1992 (aged 24)	(Madagascar)	Women's 63 kg
Marshall Islands	Mathlynn Sasser	December 25, 1996 (aged 19)	(Marshall Islands)	Women's 58 kg
Mauritius	Roilya Ranaivosoa	November 14, 1990 (aged 25)	(Mauritius)	Women's 48 kg
Mexico	Mónica Domínguez	March 5, 1988 (aged 28)	(Mexico)	Women's 58 kg
Mexico	Eva Gurrola	May 17, 1994 (aged 22)	(Mexico)	Women's 63 kg
Mexico	Alejandra Garza	August 1, 1991 (aged 25)	(Mexico)	Women's 75 kg
Mongolia	Ankhtsetseg Munkhjantsan	December 25, 1997 (aged 18)	(Mongolia)	Women's 69 kg
Morocco	Samira Ouass	April 22, 1992 (aged 24)	(Morocco)	Women's 75 kg
New Zealand	Tracey Lambrechs	August 27, 1985 (aged 30)	(New Zealand)	Women's +75 kg
Nicaragua	Scarleth Mercado	August 9, 1996 (aged 19)	(Nicaragua)	Women's 53 kg
Nigeria	Mariam Usman	November 9, 1990 (aged 25)	(Nigeria)	Women's +75 kg
North Korea	Choe Hyo-sim	December 5, 1993 (aged 22)	(North Korea)	Women's 63 kg
North Korea	Rim Jong-sim	February 5, 1993 (aged 23)	(North Korea)	Women's 75 kg
North Korea	Kim Kuk-hyang	April 20, 1993 (aged 23)	(North Korea)	Women's +75 kg
Peru	Fiorella Cueva	February 4, 1998 (aged 18)	(Peru)	Women's 48 kg
Philippines	Hidilyn Diaz	February 20, 1991 (aged 25)	(Philippines) Zamboanga City	Women's 53 kg
Poland	Patrycja Piechowiak	September 1, 1992 (aged 23)	(Poland)	Women's 69 kg
Puerto Rico	Lely Burgos	June 6, 1985 (aged 31)	(Puerto Rico) Ponce	Women's 48 kg
Romania	Florina-Sorina Hulpan	March 7, 1997 (aged 19)	(Romania)	Women's 69 kg
Romania	Andreea Aanei	November 18, 1993 (aged 22)	(Romania)	Women's +75 kg
Russia	Tima Turieva	June 22, 1992 (aged 24)	(Russia)	Women's 63 kg
Russia	Anastasiya Romanova	October 2, 1991 (aged 24)	(Russia)	Women's 69 kg
Russia	Tatiana Kashirina	January 24, 1991 (aged 25)	(Russia) (Moscow Oblast) Noginsk	Women's +75 kg
Samoa	Mary Opeloge	January 24, 1992 (aged 24)	(Samoa) Motootua	Women's 75 kg
Solomon Islands	Jenly Tegu Wini	June 9, 1983 (aged 33)	(Solomon Islands) Honiara	Women's 58 kg
South Korea	Yoon Jin-hee	August 4, 1986 (aged 30)	(South Korea) Wonju	Women's 53 kg
South Korea	Lee Hui-sol	August 27, 1989 (aged 26)	(South Korea)	Women's +75 kg
South Korea	Son Young-hee	April 24, 1994 (aged 22)	(South Korea)	Women's +75 kg
Spain	Lydia Valentín	February 10, 1985 (aged 31)	(Spain) Ponferrada	Women's 75 kg
Sweden	Angelica Roos	April 15, 1989 (aged 27)	(Sweden)	Women's 58 kg
Thailand	Sopita Tanasan	December 23, 1994 (aged 21)	(Thailand)	Women's 48 kg
Thailand	Pimsiri Sirikaew	April 25, 1990 (aged 26)	(Thailand) Mancha Khiri District	Women's 58 kg
Thailand	Sukanya Srisurat	May 3, 1995 (aged 21)	(Thailand)	Women's 58 kg
Thailand	Siripuch Gulnoi	July 17, 1993 (aged 23)	(South Korea)	Women's 63 kg
Tunisia	Yosra Dhieb	August 31, 1995 (aged 20)	(Tunisia)	Women's +75 kg
Turkey	Mehtap Kurnaz	May 1, 1995 (aged 21)	(Turkey)	Women's 63 kg
Turkey	Duygu Aynacı	June 26, 1996 (aged 20)	(Turkey)	Women's 69 kg
Turkey	Assiya İpek	December 5, 1993 (aged 22)	(Turkey)	Women's 75 kg
Turkmenistan	Gulnabat Kadyrova	June 14, 1994 (aged 22)	(Turkmenistan)	Women's 69 kg
Ukraine	Yuliya Paratova	November 7, 1986 (aged 29)	(Ukraine) Odesa	Women's 53 kg
Ukraine	Veronika Ivasyuk	October 12, 1995 (aged 20)	(Ukraine)	Women's 58 kg
Ukraine	Iryna Dekha	May 14, 1996 (aged 20)	(Ukraine) Kharkiv	Women's 75 kg
Ukraine	Anastasiya Lysenko	December 2, 1995 (aged 20)	(Ukraine)	Women's +75 kg
United Arab Emirates	Aisha Al-Balushi	January 23, 1992 (aged 24)	(United Arab Emirates)	Women's 58 kg
United States	Morghan King	October 5, 1985 (aged 30)	(United States) (Washington (state)) Seattle	Women's 48 kg
United States	Jenny Arthur	December 11, 1993 (aged 22)	(United States) (Georgia (U.S. state)) Gainesville	Women's 75 kg
United States	Sarah Robles	August 1, 1988 (aged 28)	(United States) (California) Desert Hot Springs	Women's +75 kg
Uruguay	Sofía Rito	November 2, 1985 (aged 30)	(Uruguay)	Women's 53 kg
Venezuela	Génesis Rodríguez	July 17, 1994 (aged 22)	(Venezuela)	Women's 53 kg
Venezuela	Yaniuska Espinosa	December 5, 1986 (aged 29)	(Venezuela)	Women's 75 kg
Venezuela	Naryury Pérez	September 29, 1992 (aged 23)	(Venezuela)	Women's 75 kg
Vietnam	Vương Thị Huyền	June 22, 1992 (aged 24)	(Vietnam)	Women's 48 kg
