= 2014 World Weightlifting Championships – Women's 48 kg =

The women's 48 kilograms event at the 2014 World Weightlifting Championships was held on 8 and 9 November 2014 in Baluan Sholak Sports Palace, Almaty, kazakhstan.

== Schedule ==
Date	Time	Event
8 November 2014	21:00	Group C
9 November 2014	11:00	Group B
9 November 2014	16:00	Group A

== Medalists ==
Event	Gold		Silver		Bronze	
Snatch	Tan Yayun (CHN)	85 kg	Sibel Özkan (TUR)	84 kg	Panida Khamsri (THA)	81 kg
Clean & Jerk	Tan Yayun (CHN)	109 kg	Panida Khamsri (THA)	108 kg	Sri Wahyuni Agustiani (INA)	106 kg
Total	Tan Yayun (CHN)	194 kg	Sibel Özkan (TUR)	189 kg	Panida Khamsri (THA)	189 kg

== Records ==
Prior to this competition, the existing world records were as follows.

World Record	Snatch	Yang Lian (CHN)	98 kg	Santo Domingo, Dominican	1 October 2006
World Record	Clean & Jerk	~~Nurcan Taylan (TUR)~~; Chen Xiexia (CHN)	~~121 kg~~ 120 kg	~~Antalya, Turkey~~; Tai'an, China	~~17 September 2010~~; 21 April 2007
World Record	Total	Yang Lian (CHN)	217 kg	Santo Domingo, Dominican	1 October 2006

- Nurcan Taylan's world record was rescinded in 2021.

== Results ==
Rank	Athlete	Group	Body weight	Snatch (kg)				Clean & Jerk (kg)				Total
Rank	Athlete	Group	Body weight	1	2	3	Rank	1	2	3	Rank	Total
1st place, gold medalist(s)	Tan Yayun (CHN)	A	47.74	83	85	~~87~~	1st place, gold medalist(s)	105	~~108~~	109	1st place, gold medalist(s)	194
2nd place, silver medalist(s)	Sibel Özkan (TUR)	A	47.27	82	~~84~~	84	2nd place, silver medalist(s)	103	105	~~108~~	4	189
3rd place, bronze medalist(s)	Panida Khamsri (THA)	A	47.60	76	79	81	3rd place, bronze medalist(s)	~~105~~	105	108	2nd place, silver medalist(s)	189
4	Sri Wahyuni Agustiani (INA)	A	47.63	~~75~~	77	~~80~~	9	99	101	106	3rd place, bronze medalist(s)	183
5	Genny Pagliaro (ITA)	A	47.70	~~79~~	79	81	4	97	~~100~~	~~100~~	5	178
6	Cándida Vásquez (DOM)	A	47.12	~~76~~	76	79	5	91	94	96	6	175
7	Im Jyoung-hwa (KOR)	B	47.50	70	74	77	8	92	~~96~~	96	7	173
8	Shqiponja Brahja (ALB)	C	48.00	78	~~83~~	~~83~~	6	90	95	~~97~~	13	173
9	Iana Diachenko (UKR)	A	47.44	~~77~~	77	~~80~~	7	~~91~~	91	95	11	172
10	Morghan King (USA)	B	47.57	73	~~76~~	76	12	90	~~94~~	96	8	172
11	Mirabai Chanu (IND)	B	47.71	71	74	76	13	93	96	~~98~~	9	172
12	Anaïs Michel (FRA)	B	47.82	73	75	~~77~~	15	93	96	~~98~~	10	171
13	Lely Burgos (PUR)	B	47.86	73	75	77	10	92	~~95~~	~~95~~	16	169
14	Lee Seul-ki (KOR)	B	47.63	70	73	~~75~~	16	88	92	95	12	168
15	Zhanyl Okoeva (KGZ)	B	47.46	72	~~75~~	~~75~~	19	~~94~~	94	~~99~~	14	166
16	Honami Mizuochi (JPN)	B	47.80	73	76	~~78~~	14	87	89	90	17	166
17	Georgina Silvestre (DOM)	A	47.34	76	~~79~~	~~79~~	11	~~89~~	89	—	19	165
18	Estefanía Juan (ESP)	B	47.24	~~70~~	~~70~~	70	20	90	93	~~96~~	15	163
19	Wioleta Jastrzębska (POL)	C	47.87	70	73	~~75~~	18	85	88	~~90~~	20	161
20	Viviana Muñoz (MEX)	C	47.82	63	68	~~71~~	23	85	90	~~93~~	18	158
21	Lola Kadirova (UZB)	C	47.76	70	73	~~75~~	17	82	~~84~~	84	23	157
22	Kelly Rexroad (USA)	C	47.76	67	~~70~~	70	21	84	~~87~~	87	21	157
23	Yuliya Asayonak (BLR)	C	47.81	66	~~70~~	~~70~~	24	82	87	~~92~~	22	153
24	Jenniffer López (ECU)	C	47.83	67	~~70~~	70	22	~~83~~	83	~~87~~	25	153
25	Elen Grigoryan (ARM)	C	47.75	61	65	~~66~~	26	82	83	~~86~~	24	148
26	Misaki Oshiro (JPN)	C	47.43	65	~~70~~	~~70~~	25	75	79	82	26	147
—	Margarita Yelisseyeva (KAZ)	A	47.77	~~82~~	~~82~~	~~83~~	—	—	—	—	—	—
DQ	Nurcan Taylan (TUR)	A	47.60	~~80~~	~~80~~	~~80~~	—	~~95~~	~~95~~	~~95~~	—	—
DQ	Mahliyo Togoeva (UZB)	A	47.43	75	~~78~~	78	—	100	~~104~~	~~104~~	—	—
