= Weightlifting at the 2014 Asian Games – Women's 48 kg =

Women's 48 kg at the 2014 Asian Games
- Venue: Moonlight Festival Garden Venue
- Date: 20 September 2014
- Competitors: 13 from 11 nations

Medalists
gold medal	Margarita Yelisseyeva	Kazakhstan
silver medal	Sri Wahyuni Agustiani	Indonesia
bronze medal	Mahliyo Togoeva	Uzbekistan

The women's 48 kilograms event at the 2014 Asian Games took place on 20 September 2014 at Moonlight Festival Garden Weightlifting Venue in Incheon, South Korea.

== Schedule ==
All times are Korea Standard Time (UTC+09:00)

Date	Time	Event
Saturday, 20 September 2014	16:00	Group A

== Records ==
Prior to this competition, the existing world, Asian and Games records were as follows.

World Record	Snatch	Yang Lian (CHN)	98 kg	Santo Domingo, Dominican Rep.	1 October 2006
World Record	Clean & Jerk	~~Nurcan Taylan (TUR)~~; Chen Xiexia (CHN)	~~121 kg~~ 120 kg	~~Antalya, Turkey~~; Tai'an, China	~~17 September 2010~~; 21 April 2007
World Record	Total	Yang Lian (CHN)	217 kg	Santo Domingo, Dominican Rep.	1 October 2006
Asian Record	Snatch	Yang Lian (CHN)	98 kg	Santo Domingo, Dominican Rep.	1 October 2006
Asian Record	Clean & Jerk	Chen Xiexia (CHN)	120 kg	Tai'an, China	21 April 2007
Asian Record	Total	Yang Lian (CHN)	217 kg	Santo Domingo, Dominican Rep.	1 October 2006
Games Record	Snatch	Wang Mingjuan (CHN)	95 kg	Guangzhou, China	13 November 2010
Games Record	Clean & Jerk	Wang Mingjuan (CHN)	116 kg	Doha, Qatar	2 December 2006
Games Record	Total	Wang Mingjuan (CHN)	210 kg	Guangzhou, China	13 November 2010

- Nurcan Taylan's world record was rescinded in 2021.

== Results ==
Legend

- NM — No mark

Rank	Athlete	Group	Body weight	Snatch (kg)				Clean & Jerk (kg)				Total
Rank	Athlete	Group	Body weight	1	2	3	Result	1	2	3	Result	Total
1st place, gold medalist(s)	Margarita Yelisseyeva (KAZ)	A	47.84	82	86	88	88	101	106	~~108~~	106	194
2nd place, silver medalist(s)	Sri Wahyuni Agustiani (INA)	A	47.28	~~80~~	80	~~83~~	80	103	~~107~~	107	107	187
3rd place, bronze medalist(s)	Mahliyo Togoeva (UZB)	A	47.43	~~78~~	78	81	81	102	106	~~108~~	106	187
4	Paek Il-hwa (PRK)	A	47.73	~~82~~	82	85	85	102	~~106~~	~~107~~	102	187
5	Panida Khamsri (THA)	A	47.74	75	79	81	81	102	~~107~~	~~107~~	102	183
6	Zhanyl Okoeva (KGZ)	A	47.70	72	75	~~77~~	75	~~95~~	95	101	101	176
7	Im Jyoung-hwa (KOR)	A	47.62	~~78~~	~~78~~	78	78	96	~~101~~	~~102~~	96	174
8	Đỗ Thị Thu Hoài (VIE)	A	47.64	78	~~81~~	~~81~~	78	~~95~~	~~95~~	95	95	173
9	Mirabai Chanu (IND)	A	47.45	70	73	75	75	90	93	96	96	171
10	Khumukcham Sanjita Chanu (IND)	A	47.58	70	73	~~76~~	73	90	93	~~96~~	93	166
—	Tian Yuan (CHN)	A	47.57	81	~~83~~	~~83~~	81	~~102~~	~~102~~	~~102~~	—	NM
—	Galina Momotova (KAZ)	A	47.83	~~70~~	~~70~~	~~70~~	—	—	—	—	—	NM
—	Jahura Akhter Reshma (BAN)	A	45.35	—	—	—	—	—	—	—	—	NM
