= Weightlifting at the 2016 Summer Olympics =

Weightlifting at the Games of the XXXI Olympiad
- Venue: Riocentro – Pavilion 2
- Dates: 6–16 August 2016
- No. of events: 15
- Competitors: 260 from 94 nations

Weightlifting competitions at the 2016 Summer Olympics in Rio de Janeiro took place from 6 to 16 August at the Pavilion 2 of Riocentro. 260 athletes (156 men and 104 women) competed in 15 different events according to their respective weight categories. Bulgaria and Russia were banned from participating in the sport for systematic doping.

== Events ==
15 sets of medals were awarded in the following events:

- 56 kg Men
- 62 kg Men
- 69 kg Men
- 77 kg Men
- 85 kg Men
- 94 kg Men
- 105 kg Men
- +105 kg Men

- 48 kg Women
- 53 kg Women
- 58 kg Women
- 63 kg Women
- 69 kg Women
- 75 kg Women
- +75 kg Women

== Competition schedule ==
There were at most three sessions of competition on each day of the 2016 Olympics Weightlifting program:

- Morning session: 10:00–14:00 BRT
- Afternoon session: 15:30–17:30 BRT
- Evening session: 19:00–21:00 BRT

Q	Qualification	F	Final

Date →	Sat 6	Sun 7			Mon 8			Tue 9			Wed 10			Thu 11	Fri 12			Sat 13		Sun 14	Mon 15		Tue 16	
Event ↓	E	M	A	E	M	A	E	M	A	E	M	A	E		M	A	E	A	E	E	A	E	A	E
Men's
Men's 56 kg		Q		F																				
Men's 62 kg					Q		F																	
Men's 69 kg								Q		F														
Men's 77 kg											Q		F											
Men's 85 kg															Q		F							
Men's 94 kg																		Q	F					
Men's 105 kg																					Q	F		
Men's +105 kg																							Q	F
Women's
Women's 48 kg	F																							
Women's 53 kg		Q	F																					
Women's 58 kg					Q	F																		
Women's 63 kg								Q	F															
Women's 69 kg											Q	F												
Women's 75 kg															Q	F								
Women's +75 kg																				F				

== Qualification ==
Similar to 2012 format, a total of 260 athletes qualified through a combination of team and individual spots. Host nation Brazil had already guaranteed three automatic places for men and two for women, while ten spots (six for men and four for women) were entitled to the athletes through the Tripartite Commission Invitation, leaving the remaining berths up for grabs in both the men's and women's competitions respectively.

== Participation ==
=== Participating nations ===
- Albania (2)
- Algeria (2)
- American Samoa (1)
- Argentina (1)
- Armenia (7)
- Australia (2)
- Austria (1)
- Belarus (8)
- Belgium (1)
- Brazil (5)
- Cameroon (2)
- Canada (2)
- Chile (2)
- China (10)
- Colombia (9)
- Cook Islands (1)
- Croatia (1)
- Cuba (2)
- Cyprus (1)
- Czech Republic (1)
- Dominican Republic (3)
- Ecuador (3)
- El Salvador (1)
- Estonia (1)
- Egypt (9)
- Fiji (2)
- Finland (2)
- France (5)
- Georgia (4)
- Germany (5)
- Ghana (1)
- Great Britain (2)
- Greece (1)
- Guatemala (1)
- Haiti (1)
- Honduras (1)
- Hungary (1)
- India (2)
- Indonesia (7)
- Iran (5)
- Iraq (1)
- Israel (1)
- Italy (2)
- Japan (7)
- Kazakhstan (8)
- Kenya (1)
- Kiribati (1)
- Kyrgyzstan (2)
- Latvia (2)
- Lithuania (1)
- Madagascar (1)
- Malaysia (1)
- Malta (1)
- Marshall Islands (1)
- Mauritius (1)
- Mexico (4)
- Moldova (3)
- Mongolia (2)
- Morocco (2)
- Nauru (1)
- New Zealand (2)
- Nicaragua (1)
- Nigeria (1)
- North Korea (8)
- Papua New Guinea (1)
- Peru (2)
- Philippines (2)
- Poland (5)
- Puerto Rico (1)
- Qatar (1)
- Romania (4)
- Samoa (2)
- Saudi Arabia (1)
- Serbia (1)
- Seychelles (1)
- Slovakia (1)
- Solomon Islands (1)
- South Korea (7)
- Spain (4)
- Sri Lanka (1)
- Sweden (1)
- Syria (1)
- Chinese Taipei (7)
- Thailand (9)
- Tunisia (2)
- Turkey (4)
- Turkmenistan (2)
- Ukraine (8)
- United Arab Emirates (1)
- United States (4)
- Uruguay (1)
- Uzbekistan (5)
- Venezuela (4)
- Vietnam (4)

== Medal summary ==
=== Medal table ===
Rank	Nation	Gold	Silver	Bronze	Total
1	China	5	2	0	7
2	Thailand	2	1	1	4
3	Iran	2	0	0	2
4	North Korea	1	3	0	4
5	Chinese Taipei	1	0	1	2
5	Colombia	1	0	1	2
5	Georgia	1	0	1	2
8	Uzbekistan	1	0	0	1
9	Armenia	0	2	0	2
9	Belarus	0	2	0	2
9	Indonesia	0	2	0	2
12	Kazakhstan	0	1	4	5
13	Philippines	0	1	0	1
13	Turkey	0	1	0	1
15	Egypt	0	0	2	2
16	Japan	0	0	1	1
16	Lithuania	0	0	1	1
16	South Korea	0	0	1	1
16	Spain	0	0	1	1
16	United States	0	0	1	1
Totals (20 entries)		14	15	15	44

=== Olympic records broken ===
Five Olympic records were broken.

=== Men's events ===
Games	Gold	Silver	Bronze
56 kg	Long Qingquan; China WR	Om Yun-chol; North Korea	Sinphet Kruaithong; Thailand
62 kg	Óscar Figueroa; Colombia	Eko Yuli Irawan; Indonesia	Farkhad Kharki; Kazakhstan
69 kg^{[a]}	Shi Zhiyong; China	Daniyar Ismayilov; Turkey	Luis Javier Mosquera; Colombia
77 kg^{[b]}	vacant	Lü Xiaojun; China WR	Mohamed Ihab; Egypt
85 kg^{[c]}	Kianoush Rostami; Iran WR OR	Tian Tao; China OR	Denis Ulanov; Kazakhstan
94 kg	Sohrab Moradi; Iran	Vadzim Straltsou; Belarus	Aurimas Didžbalis; Lithuania
105 kg	Ruslan Nurudinov; Uzbekistan OR	Simon Martirosyan; Armenia	Aleksandr Zaychikov; Kazakhstan
+105 kg	Lasha Talakhadze; Georgia WR OR	Gor Minasyan; Armenia	Irakli Turmanidze; Georgia

- ^{Men's 69kg} Kyrgyzstan's Izzat Artykov originally won the bronze medal, but was disqualified after he tested positive for strychnine.
- ^{Men's 77kg} On 22 March 2022, the Court of Arbitration for Sport stated that the original gold medalist Nijat Rahimov, of Kazakhstan, was disqualified due to a doping offence. The IOC has not yet redistributed the medals.
- ^{Men's 85kg} On 8 December 2016, the Court of Arbitration for Sport stated that the original bronze medalist Gabriel Sincraian, of Romania, was disqualified after he tested positive for exogenous Testosterone.

=== Women's events ===
Games	Gold	Silver	Bronze
48 kg	Sopita Tanasan; Thailand	Sri Wahyuni Agustiani; Indonesia	Hiromi Miyake; Japan
53 kg	Hsu Shu-ching; Chinese Taipei	Hidilyn Diaz; Philippines	Yoon Jin-hee; South Korea
58 kg	Sukanya Srisurat; Thailand OR	Pimsiri Sirikaew; Thailand	Kuo Hsing-chun; Chinese Taipei
63 kg	Deng Wei; China WR	Choe Hyo-sim; North Korea	Karina Goricheva; Kazakhstan
69 kg	Xiang Yanmei; China	Zhazira Zhapparkul; Kazakhstan	Sara Ahmed; Egypt
75 kg	Rim Jong-sim; North Korea	Darya Naumava; Belarus	Lydia Valentín; Spain
+75 kg	Meng Suping; China	Kim Kuk-hyang; North Korea	Sarah Robles; United States

== See also ==
- Powerlifting at the 2016 Summer Paralympics
