= Badminton at the 2016 Summer Olympics – Men's doubles =

Men's doubles at the Games of the XXXI Olympiad
- Venue: Riocentro - Pavilion 4
- Date: 11–20 August 2016
- Competitors: 32 from 14 nations

Medalists
| 1st place, gold medalist(s) | | Fu Haifeng; Zhang Nan | China |
| 2nd place, silver medalist(s) | | Goh V Shem; Tan Wee Kiong | Malaysia |
| 3rd place, bronze medalist(s) | | Marcus Ellis; Chris Langridge | Great Britain |

The men's doubles badminton tournament at the 2016 Summer Olympics took place 11–20 August 2016 at Riocentro - Pavilion 4. The seeding was decided on 21 July 2016.

Defending Olympic champion Fu Haifeng and his partner Zhang Nan of China defeated Malaysia's Goh V Shem and Tan Wee Kiong in the final, 16–21, 21–11, 23–21, to win the gold medal in men's doubles badminton at the 2016 Summer Olympics. It was Fu's second consecutive men's doubles gold medal, after winning the event in 2012 with Cai Yun, and Zhang's second Olympic badminton gold medal after winning the mixed doubles event in 2012 with Zhao Yunlei. The pair saved two match points in the third game on route to the title. In the bronze-medal match, Marcus Ellis and Chris Langridge of Great Britain defeated China's Chai Biao and Hong Wei 21–18, 19–21, 21–10. It was Great Britain's first Olympic medal in badminton since 2004.

== Competition format ==
The tournament started with a group phase round-robin followed by a knockout stage.

== Seeds ==
A total of 4 pairs were given seeds.

1. Lee Yong-dae / Yoo Yeon-seong (KOR) (quarter-finals)
2. Mohammad Ahsan / Hendra Setiawan (INA) (group stage)
3. Kim Gi-jung / Kim Sa-rang (KOR) (quarter-finals)
4. Fu Haifeng / Zhang Nan (CHN) (gold medalists)

== Results ==
=== Group stage ===
==== Group A ====
| Team | Pld | W | L | SW | SL | Pts |
|---|---|---|---|---|---|---|
| Vladimir Ivanov / Ivan Sozonov (RUS) | 3 | 3 | 0 | 6 | 1 | 3 |
| Lee Yong-dae / Yoo Yeon-seong (KOR) | 3 | 2 | 1 | 5 | 3 | 2 |
| Lee Sheng-mu / Tsai Chia-hsin (TPE) | 3 | 1 | 2 | 3 | 4 | 1 |
| Matthew Chau / Sawan Serasinghe (AUS) | 3 | 0 | 3 | 0 | 6 | 0 |

| Team 1 | Score | Team 2 |
11 August, 08:25
| Lee Y-d / Yoo Y-s (KOR) | 21–14; 21–16 | M Chau / S Serasinghe (AUS) |
11 August, 10:45
| V Ivanov / I Sozonov (RUS) | 21–11; 22–20 | Lee S-m / Tsai C-h (TPE) |
12 August, 09:35
| Lee Y-d / Yoo Y-s (KOR) | 18–21; 21–13; 21–18 | Lee S-m / Tsai C-h (TPE) |
12 August, 17:25
| V Ivanov / I Sozonov (RUS) | 21–16; 21–16 | M Chau / S Serasinghe (AUS) |
13 August, 08:00
| Lee S-m / Tsai C-h (TPE) | 21–14; 21–19 | M Chau / S Serasinghe (AUS) |
13 August, 10:45
| Lee Y-d / Yoo Y-s (KOR) | 17–21; 21–19; 16–21 | V Ivanov / I Sozonov (RUS) |

==== Group B ====
| Team | Pld | W | L | SW | SL | Pts |
|---|---|---|---|---|---|---|
| Goh V Shem / Tan Wee Kiong (MAS) | 3 | 3 | 0 | 6 | 1 | 3 |
| Fu Haifeng / Zhang Nan (CHN) | 3 | 2 | 1 | 5 | 2 | 2 |
| Michael Fuchs / Johannes Schöttler (GER) | 3 | 1 | 2 | 2 | 4 | 1 |
| Phillip Chew / Sattawat Pongnairat (USA) | 3 | 0 | 3 | 0 | 6 | 0 |

| Team 1 | Score | Team 2 |
11 August, 15:55
| Goh V S / Tan W K (MAS) | 21–14; 21–17 | M Fuchs / J Schöttler (GER) |
11 August, 15:55
| Fu HF / Zhang N (CHN) | 21–6; 21–7 | P Chew / S Pongnairat (USA) |
12 August, 08:25
| Goh V S / Tan W K (MAS) | 21–12; 21–10 | P Chew / S Pongnairat (USA) |
12 August, 16:40
| Fu HF / Zhang N (CHN) | 21–11; 21–16 | M Fuchs / J Schöttler (GER) |
13 August, 09:00
| M Fuchs / J Schöttler (GER) | 21–14; 21–14 | P Chew / S Pongnairat (USA) |
13 August, 10:10
| Fu HF / Zhang N (CHN) | 21–16; 15–21; 18–21 | Goh V S / Tan W K (MAS) |

==== Group C ====
| Team | Pld | W | L | SW | SL | Pts |
|---|---|---|---|---|---|---|
| Kim Gi-jung / Kim Sa-rang (KOR) | 3 | 2 | 1 | 5 | 2 | 2 |
| Marcus Ellis / Chris Langridge (GBR) | 3 | 2 | 1 | 5 | 3 | 2 |
| Mathias Boe / Carsten Mogensen (DEN) | 3 | 2 | 1 | 4 | 3 | 2 |
| Adam Cwalina / Przemysław Wacha (POL) | 3 | 0 | 3 | 0 | 6 | 0 |

| Team 1 | Score | Team 2 |
11 August, 08:00
| Kim G-j / Kim S-r (KOR) | 21–14; 21–15 | A Cwalina / P Wacha (POL) |
11 August, 17:25
| M Boe / C Mogensen (DEN) | 21–9; 9–21; 21–16 | M Ellis / C Langridge (GBR) |
12 August, 11:20
| Kim G-j / Kim S-r (KOR) | 21–17; 23–25; 18–21 | M Ellis / C Langridge (GBR) |
12 August, 17:25
| M Boe / C Mogensen (DEN) | 21–17; 21–17 | A Cwalina / P Wacha (POL) |
13 August, 15:30
| Kim G-j / Kim S-r (KOR) | 21–15; 21–18 | M Boe / C Mogensen (DEN) |
13 August, 15:30
| M Ellis / C Langridge (GBR) | 21–18; 21–16 | A Cwalina / P Wacha (POL) |

==== Group D ====
| Team | Pld | W | L | SW | SL | Pts |
|---|---|---|---|---|---|---|
| Hiroyuki Endo / Kenichi Hayakawa (JPN) | 3 | 2 | 1 | 4 | 4 | 2 |
| Chai Biao / Hong Wei (CHN) | 3 | 2 | 1 | 5 | 2 | 2 |
| Mohammad Ahsan / Hendra Setiawan (INA) | 3 | 1 | 2 | 3 | 4 | 1 |
| Manu Attri / B. Sumeeth Reddy (IND) | 3 | 1 | 2 | 2 | 4 | 1 |

| Team 1 | Score | Team 2 |
11 August, 09:00
| M Ahsan / H Setiawan (INA) | 21–18; 21–13 | M Attri / B. S Reddy (IND) |
11 August, 10:45
| Chai B / Hong W (CHN) | 18–21; 21–14; 21–23 | H Endo / K Hayakawa (JPN) |
12 August, 10:10
| M Ahsan / H Setiawan (INA) | 17–21; 21–16; 14–21 | H Endo / K Hayakawa (JPN) |
12 August, 11:20
| Chai B / Hong W (CHN) | 21–13; 21–15 | M Attri / B. S Reddy (IND) |
13 August, 09:00
| M Ahsan / H Setiawan (INA) | 15–21; 17–21 | Chai B / Hong W (CHN) |
13 August, 19:55
| H Endo / K Hayakawa (JPN) | 21–23; 11–21 | M Attri / B. S Reddy (IND) |

=== Finals ===
Quarter-finals
A1 | Vladimir Ivanov (RUS); Ivan Sozonov (RUS) | 13 | 21 | 16
D2 | Chai Biao (CHN); Hong Wei (CHN) | 21 | 16 | 21
B1 | Goh V Shem (MAS); Tan Wee Kiong (MAS) | 17 | 21 | 21
A2 | Lee Yong-dae (KOR); Yoo Yeon-seong (KOR) | 21 | 18 | 19
B2 | Fu Haifeng (CHN); Zhang Nan (CHN) | 11 | 21 | 24
C1 | Kim Gi-jung (KOR); Kim Sa-rang (KOR) | 21 | 18 | 22
C2 | Marcus Ellis (GBR); Chris Langridge (GBR) | 21 | 21
D1 | Hiroyuki Endo (JPN); Kenichi Hayakawa (JPN) | 19 | 17

Semi-finals
D2 | Chai Biao (CHN); Hong Wei (CHN) | 18 | 21 | 17
B1 | Goh V Shem (MAS); Tan Wee Kiong (MAS) | 21 | 12 | 21
B2 | Fu Haifeng (CHN); Zhang Nan (CHN) | 21 | 21
C2 | Marcus Ellis (GBR); Chris Langridge (GBR) | 14 | 18

Final
B1 | Goh V Shem (MAS); Tan Wee Kiong (MAS) | 21 | 11 | 21
B2 | Fu Haifeng (CHN); Zhang Nan (CHN) | 16 | 21 | 23
Bronze-medal match
D2 | Chai Biao (CHN); Hong Wei (CHN) | 18 | 21 | 10
C2 | Marcus Ellis (GBR); Chris Langridge (GBR) | 21 | 19 | 21
