= Indonesia at the 2016 Summer Olympics =

- IOC code: INA
- NOC: Indonesian Olympic Committee
- Website: www.nocindonesia.or.id (in Indonesian)

in Rio de Janeiro
- Competitors: 28 in 7 sports
- Flag bearers: Maria Natalia Londa (opening); Volunteer – ROOG (closing)
- Officials: Raja Sapta Oktohari (Chief de Mission)
- Medals Ranked 46th: Gold 1 Silver 2 Bronze 0 Total 3

Summer Olympics appearances (overview)
- 1952; 1956; 1960; 1964; 1968; 1972; 1976; 1980; 1984; 1988; 1992; 1996; 2000; 2004; 2008; 2012; 2016; 2020; 2024

Indonesia competed at the 2016 Summer Olympics in Rio de Janeiro, Brazil, from 5 to 21 August 2016. This was the nation's fifteenth appearance at the Summer Olympics.

The National Sports Committee of Indonesia (Indonesian: Komite Olahraga Nasional Indonesia, KONI) confirmed a team of 28 athletes, 17 men and 11 women, to compete across seven sports at the Games. Three of them obtained their spots to compete in athletics and swimming through wild card entries, with the rest of the team directly qualifying for the Games on merit. Among the sporting events the nation competed in, Indonesia made its Olympic debut in men's team archery and BMX cycling, as well as its return to rowing after 12 years.

The Indonesian roster featured ten returning Olympians, with three of them headed to their third straight Games: badminton shuttler Liliyana Natsir, along with her partner Tontowi Ahmad, in the mixed doubles, and two-time bronze medalists Eko Yuli Irawan and Triyatno in weightlifting. Other notable Indonesian athletes included Beijing 2008 champion Hendra Setiawan in the men's badminton doubles and long jumper and reigning Asian Games champion Maria Natalia Londa, who was appointed as the nation's flag bearer in the opening ceremony.

Indonesia left Rio de Janeiro with three Olympic medals (one gold and two silvers), improving its medal tally from London four years earlier. Among the nation's medalists were badminton players Ahmad and Natsir, who both bounced back from their fourth-place finish in London to secure the mixed doubles gold, and weightlifting rookie Sri Wahyuni Agustiani, who won Indonesia's first medal of the Games with a silver in the women's 48 kg. Meanwhile, Irawan set a historic milestone as the first Indonesian weightlifter to win medals across three Olympic Games, winning a silver in the men's 62 kg to complement his two previous bronze medals.

== Medalists ==
Medal	Name	Sport	Event	Date
Gold	Tontowi Ahmad; Liliyana Natsir	Badminton	Mixed doubles	17 August
Silver	Sri Wahyuni Agustiani	Weightlifting	Women's 48 kg	6 August
Silver	Eko Yuli Irawan	Weightlifting	Men's 62 kg	8 August

Medals by sport
Sport	1st place, gold medalist(s)	2nd place, silver medalist(s)	3rd place, bronze medalist(s)	Total
Badminton	1	0	0	1
Weightlifting	0	2	0	2
Total	1	2	0	3

Medals by gender
Gender	1st place, gold medalist(s)	2nd place, silver medalist(s)	3rd place, bronze medalist(s)	Total
Female	0	1	0	1
Male	0	1	0	1
Mixed	1	0	0	1
Total	1	2	0	3

Medals by date
Date	1st place, gold medalist(s)	2nd place, silver medalist(s)	3rd place, bronze medalist(s)	Total
6 August	0	1	0	1
8 August	0	1	0	1
17 August	1	0	0	1
Total	1	2	0	3

== Competitors ==
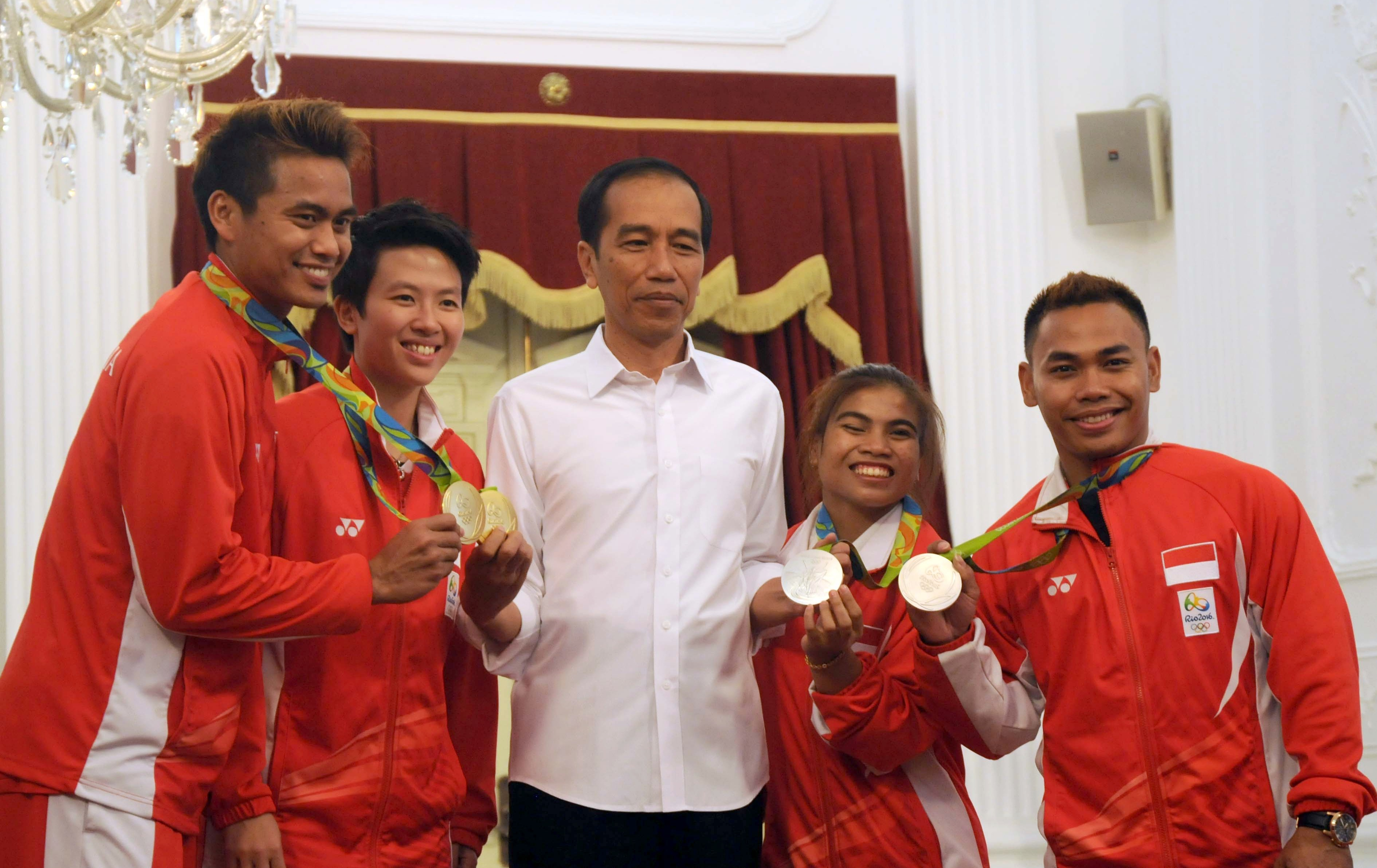
President Joko Widodo with Indonesian Olympic medalists at the State Palace in Jakarta. Left-right: Ahmad, Natsir, Widodo, Agustiani and Irawan

The following is the list of number of competitors participating in the Games:

Sport	Men	Women	Total
Archery	3	1	4
Athletics	1	1	2
Badminton	5	5	10
Cycling	1	0	1
Rowing	1	1	2
Swimming	1	1	2
Weightlifting	5	2	7
Total	17	11	28

== Archery ==
One Indonesian archer qualified for the women's individual recurve by obtaining one of the eight Olympic places available from the 2015 World Archery Championships in Copenhagen, Denmark. Three Indonesian archers qualified for the men's events by virtue of the nation's podium finish in the team recurve competition at the 2016 Archery World Cup meet in Antalya, Turkey.

Athlete	Event	Ranking round		Round of 64	Round of 32	Round of 16	Quarterfinals	Semifinals	Final / BM	
Athlete	Event	Score	Seed	Opposition Score	Opposition Score	Opposition Score	Opposition Score	Opposition Score	Opposition Score	Rank
Riau Ega Agatha	Men's individual	660	33	Xing (CHN); W 7–1	Kim (KOR); W 6–2	Nespoli (ITA); L 0–6	Did not advance			
Hendra Purnama	Men's individual	655	39	Ruban (UKR); L 4–7	Did not advance					
Muhammad Wijaya	Men's individual	647	49	Nespoli (ITA); L 3–7	Did not advance					
Riau Ega Agatha; Hendra Purnama; Muhammad Wijaya	Men's team	1962	10	—N/a		Chinese Taipei; W 6–2	United States; L 2–6	Did not advance		
Ika Yuliana Rochmawati	Women's individual	617	42	Folkard (GBR); L 5–6	Did not advance					

== Athletics ==
Indonesian athletes have so far achieved qualifying standards in the following athletics events (up to a maximum of 3 athletes in each event):

Key

- Note–Ranks given for track events are within the athlete's heat only
- Q = Qualified for the next round
- q = Qualified for the next round as a fastest loser or, in field events, by position without achieving the qualifying target
- NR = National record
- N/A = Round not applicable for the event
- Bye = Athlete not required to compete in round

Track & road events

Athlete	Event	Preliminaries		Round 1		Semifinal		Final	
Athlete	Event	Result	Rank	Result	Rank	Result	Rank	Result	Rank
Sudirman Hadi	Men's 100 m	10.77	2 Q	10.70	9	did not advance			

Field events

Athlete	Event	Qualification		Final	
Athlete	Event	Distance	Position	Distance	Position
Maria Natalia Londa	Women's long jump	6.29	26	Did not advance	

== Badminton ==
Indonesia has qualified a total of ten badminton players for each of the following events into the Olympic tournament based on the BWF World Rankings as of 5 May 2016: two pairs in the mixed doubles, a pair each in the men's and women's doubles, and one entry each in the men's and women's singles.

Men

Athlete	Event	Group stage				Elimination	Quarterfinal	Semifinal	Final / BM	
Athlete	Event	Opposition Score	Opposition Score	Opposition Score	Rank	Opposition Score	Opposition Score	Opposition Score	Opposition Score	Rank
Tommy Sugiarto	Singles	Shu (USA); W (21–14, 21–10)	Guerrero (CUB); W (21–12, 21–14)	—N/a	1 Q	Ouseph (GBR); L (13–21, 21–14, 16–21)	Did not advance			
Mohammad Ahsan; Hendra Setiawan	Doubles	Attri / Reddy (IND); W (21–18, 21–13)	Endo / Hayakawa (JPN); L (17–21, 21–16, 14–21)	Chai / Hong (CHN); L (15–21, 17–21)	3	—N/a	Did not advance			

Women

Athlete	Event	Group stage				Elimination	Quarterfinal	Semifinal	Final / BM	
Athlete	Event	Opposition Score	Opposition Score	Opposition Score	Rank	Opposition Score	Opposition Score	Opposition Score	Opposition Score	Rank
Lindaweni Fanetri	Singles	Vū (VIE); L (11–21, 12–21)	Okuhara (JPN); L (12–21, 12–21)	—N/a	3	Did not advance				
Nitya Krishinda Maheswari; Greysia Polii	Doubles	Poon / Tse (HKG); W (21–9, 21–11)	Olver / Smith (GBR); W (21–10, 21–13)	Hoo / Woon (MAS); W (21–19, 21–19)	1 Q	—N/a	Tang / Yu (CHN); L (11–21, 14–21)	Did not advance		

Mixed

Athlete	Event	Group stage				Quarterfinal	Semifinal	Final / BM	
Athlete	Event	Opposition Score	Opposition Score	Opposition Score	Rank	Opposition Score	Opposition Score	Opposition Score	Rank
Tontowi Ahmad; Liliyana Natsir	Doubles	Middleton / Choo (AUS); W (21–7, 21–8)	Isara / Amitrapai (THA); W (21–11, 21–13)	Chan / Goh (MAS); W (21–15, 21–11)	1 Q	Jordan / Susanto (INA); W (21–16, 21–11)	Zhang / Zhao (CHN); W (21–16, 21–15)	Chan / Goh (MAS); W (21–14, 21–12)	1st place, gold medalist(s)
Praveen Jordan; Debby Susanto	Doubles	Lee / Chau (HKG); W (21–19, 19–21, 21–15)	Fuchs / Michels (GER); W (21–16, 21–15)	Zhang / Zhao (CHN); L (11–21, 18–21)	2 Q	Ahmad / Natsir (INA); L (16–21, 11–21)	Did not advance		

== Cycling ==
=== BMX ===
Indonesia received an invitation from the UCI to send a men's BMX rider to the Olympics, as the next highest-ranked eligible nation, not yet qualified, in the UCI Olympic Ranking List of May 31, 2016, signifying the nation's Olympic return to the sport for the first time since 2004. Indonesia's top-ranked BMX rider and 2014 Asian Games fourth-place finalist Toni Syarifudin was named to the Olympic roster on June 8, 2016.

Athlete	Event	Seeding		Quarterfinal		Semifinal		Final	
Athlete	Event	Result	Rank	Points	Rank	Points	Rank	Result	Rank
Toni Syarifudin	Men's BMX	40.975	31	22	7	Did not advance			

== Rowing ==
Indonesia has qualified one boat each in the men's and women's single sculls for the Olympics at the 2016 Asia & Oceania Continental Qualification Regatta in Chungju, South Korea, signifying the nation's Olympic return to the sport for the first time since 2004.

Athlete	Event	Heats		Repechage		Quarterfinals		Semifinals		Final	
Athlete	Event	Time	Rank	Time	Rank	Time	Rank	Time	Rank	Time	Rank
Memo	Men's single sculls	7:14.17	3 QF	Bye		6:59.76	4 SC/D	7:25.60	3 FC	6:59.44	16
Dewi Yuliawati	Women's single sculls	9:36.10	6 R	8:14.81	5 SE/F	Bye		8:39.95	2 FE	8:44.54	29

Qualification Legend: FA=Final A (medal); FB=Final B (non-medal); FC=Final C (non-medal); FD=Final D (non-medal); FE=Final E (non-medal); FF=Final F (non-medal); SA/B=Semifinals A/B; SC/D=Semifinals C/D; SE/F=Semifinals E/F; QF=Quarterfinals; R=Repechage

== Swimming ==
Indonesia has received a Universality invitation from FINA to send two swimmers (one male and one female) to the Olympics.

Athlete	Event	Heat		Semifinal		Final	
Athlete	Event	Time	Rank	Time	Rank	Time	Rank
Glenn Victor Sutanto	Men's 100 m butterfly	54.25	35	Did not advance			
Yessy Yosaputra	Women's 200 m backstroke	2:20.88	28	Did not advance			

== Weightlifting ==
Indonesian weightlifters have qualified five men's and two women's quota places for the Rio Olympics based on their combined team standing by points at the 2014 and 2015 IWF World Championships. The team must allocate these places to individual athletes by June 20, 2016.

The weightlifting team, headlined by London 2012 medalists Eko Yuli Irawan and Triyatno, was named to the Olympic roster on June 21, 2016.

Men

Athlete	Event	Snatch		Clean & jerk		Total	Rank
Athlete	Event	Result	Rank	Result	Rank	Total	Rank
Eko Yuli Irawan	−62 kg	142	2	170	2	312	2nd place, silver medalist(s)
Muhammad Hasbi	−62 kg	130	6	160	8	290	7
Triyatno	−69 kg	142	9	175	14	317	9
I Ketut Ariana	−69 kg	~~145~~	DNF	—	—	—	DNF
Deni	−77 kg	146	13	177	12	323	12

Women

Athlete	Event	Snatch		Clean & jerk		Total	Rank
Athlete	Event	Result	Rank	Result	Rank	Total	Rank
Sri Wahyuni Agustiani	−48 kg	85	2	107	2	192	2nd place, silver medalist(s)
Dewi Safitri	−53 kg	80	7	105	6	185	7

== See also ==
- 2016 Olympic Games
- 2016 Paralympic Games
- Indonesia at the Olympics
- Indonesia at the Paralympics
- Indonesia at the 2016 Summer Paralympics
