= Zhanyl Okoeva =

Kyrgyzstani weightlifter

Personal information
- Full name: Zhanyl Okoeva
- Born: 15 November 1993 (age 32) Bishkek, Kyrgyzstan
- Height: 1.65 m (5 ft 5 in)
- Weight: 47.86 kg (106 lb)

Sport
- Country: Kyrgyzstan
- Sport: Weightlifting
- Updated on 9 April 2017

Zhanyl Okoeva (Russian: Жаныл Окоева; born November 15, 1993) is a Kyrgyzstani weightlifter, competing in the 48 kg category and representing Kyrgyzstan at international competitions. She participated in the women's 48 kg event at the 2015 World Weightlifting Championships, and at the 2016 Summer Olympics, finishing in tenth position.

== Major results ==
Year	Venue	Weight	Snatch (kg)				Clean & Jerk (kg)				Total	Rank
Year	Venue	Weight	1	2	3	Rank	1	2	3	Rank	Total	Rank
Representing Kyrgyzstan
Olympic Games
2016	Rio de Janeiro, Brazil	48 kg	68	72	~~75~~	11	92	97	~~101~~	8	169	10
World Championships
2015	Houston, United States	48 kg	70	~~73~~	73	28	97	~~101~~	~~101~~	18	170	25
2014	Almaty, Kazakhstan	48 kg	72	~~75~~	~~75~~	19	~~94~~	94	~~99~~	14	166	15
Asian Games
2018	Jakarta, Indonesia	48 kg	68	~~72~~	72	8	95	~~101~~	~~101~~	8	167	8
2014	Incheon, South Korea	48 kg	72	75	~~77~~	10	~~95~~	95	101	6	176	6
Asian Championships
2016	Tashkent, Uzbekistan	48 kg	72	75	~~78~~	10	98	~~102~~	102	8	177	10
2015	Phuket, Thailand	48 kg	72	~~76~~	~~76~~	6	98	~~102~~	~~103~~	5	170	6
2012	Pyeongtaek, South Korea	48 kg	63	~~66~~	~~68~~	14	85	~~90~~	~~90~~	14	148	14
