= Fiorella Cueva =

Peruvian weightlifter (born 1998)

Personal information
- Full name: Fiorella Francesca Cueva Uribe
- Nationality: Peruvian
- Born: 4 February 1998 (age 28)
- Height: 1.5 m (4 ft 11 in)
- Weight: 48 kg (106 lb)

Sport
- Country: Peru
- Sport: Weightlifting
- Event(s): Women's 48 kg & 53 kg

Fiorella Cueva (born 4 February 1998) is a Peruvian weightlifter. She competed in the women's 53 kg event at the 2016 Summer Olympics.

== Major results ==
Year	Venue	Weight	Snatch (kg)				Clean & Jerk (kg)				Total	Rank
Year	Venue	Weight	1	2	3	Rank	1	2	3	Rank	Total	Rank
Representing Peru
Olympic Games
2016	Rio de Janeiro, Brazil	53 kg	62	65	~~67~~	12	85	88	~~90~~	11	153	11
World Championships
2019	Pattaya, Thailand	49 kg	67	70	~~72~~	29	90	~~93~~	93	20	163	25
2017	Anaheim, United States	48 kg	63	66	~~68~~	17	87	90	~~92~~	15	156	15
Pan American Games
2019	Lima, Peru	49 kg	70	73	75	8	~~95~~	~~95~~	~~95~~	-	-	-
Pan American Championships
2020	Santo Domingo, Dominican Republic	49 kg	65	69	~~71~~	10	87	90	92	9	161	8
2019	Guatemala City, Guatemala	45 kg	64	67	69	2nd place, silver medalist(s)	80	85	90	2nd place, silver medalist(s)	159	2nd place, silver medalist(s)
2018	Santo Domingo, Dominican Republic	48 kg	66	68	70	12	~~92~~	92	~~95~~	8	162	10
2016	Cartagena, Colombia	48 kg	62	65	~~67~~	8	84	88	90	5	155	7
2014	Santo Domingo, Dominican Republic	48 kg	48	51	53	14	70	~~73~~	73	13	126	13
South American Championships
2019	Palmira, Colombia	45 kg	65	67	~~69~~	3rd place, bronze medalist(s)	80	85	89	3rd place, bronze medalist(s)	156	3rd place, bronze medalist(s)
2017	Santa Marta, Colombia	48 kg	63	66	68	4	88	91	~~94~~	3rd place, bronze medalist(s)	159	4
2016	Rio de Janeiro, Brazil	48 kg	57	59	61	3rd place, bronze medalist(s)	76	80	83	2nd place, silver medalist(s)	144	3rd place, bronze medalist(s)
