= Weightlifting at the 2013 SEA Games – Women's 48 kg =

The Women's 48 kg event at the 2013 SEA Games took place on 13 December 2013 at Thein Phyu Stadium.

== Schedule ==
All times are Myanmar Standard Time (UTC+06:30)

Date	Time	Event
Friday, 13 December 2013	14:00	Final

== Results ==
Rank	Athlete	Group	Body weight	Snatch (kg)				Clean & Jerk (kg)				Total
Rank	Athlete	Group	Body weight	1	2	3	Result	1	2	3	Result	Total
1st place, gold medalist(s)	Sri Wahyuni Agustiani (INA)	A	47.90	75	80	82	82	101	106	~~113~~	106	188
2nd place, silver medalist(s)	Panida Khamsri (THA)	A	47.75	77	~~79~~	~~79~~	77	100	~~106~~	~~106~~	100	177
3rd place, bronze medalist(s)	Hoai Do Thi Thu (VIE)	A	47.70	~~78~~	78	~~81~~	78	~~95~~	95	98	98	176
4	Khine Khine (MYA)	A	46.45	73	76	~~78~~	76	~~95~~	95	97	97	171
