= Jahura Akhter Reshma =

Bangladeshi weightlifter

Personal information
- Native name: জহুরা আক্তার রেশমা
- Full name: Jahura Akter Reshma
- Born: 11 July 1998 (age 28)
- Weight: 45.35 kg (100.0 lb)

Sport
- Country: Bangladesh
- Sport: Weightlifting
- Weight class: 48 kg
- Team: National team
- Updated on 18 October 2016

Jahura Akter Reshma (born 11 July 1998) is a Bangladeshi female weightlifter, competing in the 48 kg category and representing Bangladesh at international competitions.

She participated at the 2014 Asian Games in the 48 kg event and at the 2014 Summer Youth Olympics in the Girls' 48 kg event.
