= Chinese Taipei at the 2016 Summer Olympics =

- Chinese Taipei Olympic flag
- IOC code: TPE
- NOC: Chinese Taipei Olympic Committee
- Website: www.tpenoc.net (in Chinese and English)

in Rio de Janeiro
- Competitors: 57 in 18 sports
- Flag bearers: Isheau Wong (opening); Hsu Shu-ching (closing)
- Medals Ranked 50th: Gold 1 Silver 0 Bronze 2 Total 3

Summer Olympics appearances (overview)
- 1956; 1960; 1964; 1968; 1972; 1976–1980; 1984; 1988; 1992; 1996; 2000; 2004; 2008; 2012; 2016; 2020; 2024

Other related appearances
- Republic of China (1924–1948)

Chinese Taipei competed at the 2016 Summer Olympics in Rio de Janeiro, Brazil, from 5 to 21 August 2016. "Chinese Taipei" is the designated name used by Taiwan to participate in some international organizations and almost all sporting events, including the Olympic Games. Neither the common name "Taiwan" nor the official name "Republic of China" would be used due primarily to opposition from the People's Republic of China. This was also the region's ninth consecutive appearance at the Summer Olympics.

The Chinese Taipei Olympic Committee sent a team of 57 athletes, 26 men and 31 women, to compete in 18 sports at the Games. For only the third time in Olympic history, Chinese Taipei roster featured more female athletes than males. Among the sporting events represented by the nation's athletes, Chinese Taipei made its Olympic debut in equestrian jumping and golf (new to the 2016 Games), as well as its return to gymnastics, boxing, and wrestling after more than fifteen years.

World-ranked tennis star Lu Yen-hsun, table tennis players Huang I-hua and London 2012 fourth-place finalist Chuang Chih-yuan, and trap shooter Lin Yi-chun highlighted the list of athletes to make the Chinese Taipei roster for their fourth Olympics. Apart from the veterans, twelve Taiwanese athletes previously competed in London, with weightlifter Hsu Shu-ching leading them as the only medalist to return for her second appearance in Rio de Janeiro. Other notable athletes from Chinese Taipei also featured world's top 30 golfers Candie Kung and Teresa Lu, and lone show jumper Isheau Wong, who eventually served as the nation's second female flag bearer in the opening ceremony (the first having done so in 2008).

Chinese Taipei left Rio de Janeiro with only three medals (one gold and two bronze), a slight improvement on the team's performance at the previous Games. Among the medalists were the women's archery team (led by Tan Ya-ting, who eventually finished among the top eight in the individual recurve), and weightlifters Kuo Hsing-chun (women's 58 kg) and Hsu, who upgraded her silver from London to a golden finish in the women's 53 kg category. For the first time in history, Chinese Taipei did not obtain any medals in taekwondo, since the sport was officially added to the Olympic program in 2000.

== Medalists ==
Medal	Name	Sport	Event	Date
Gold	Hsu Shu-ching	Weightlifting	Women's 53 kg	7 August
Bronze	Le Chien-ying; Lin Shih-chia; Tan Ya-ting	Archery	Women's team	7 August
Bronze	Kuo Hsing-chun	Weightlifting	Women's 58 kg	8 August

== Archery ==
Three Taiwanese archers qualified for the men's events after having secured a top eight finish in the team recurve at the 2015 World Archery Championships in Copenhagen, Denmark. Another set of three archers qualified for the women's events by virtue of the nation's podium finish in the team recurve competition at the 2016 Archery World Cup meet in Antalya, Turkey.

The Taiwanese archery team for the Games, led by London 2012 Olympian Tan Ya-ting, was announced on 26 February 2016, based on their results at the Olympic Team Trials.

Men

Athlete	Event	Ranking round		Round of 64	Round of 32	Round of 16	Quarterfinals	Semifinals	Final / BM	
Athlete	Event	Score	Seed	Opposition Score	Opposition Score	Opposition Score	Opposition Score	Opposition Score	Opposition Score	Rank
Kao Hao-wen	Individual	661	30	Fernández (ESP); L 0–6	Did not advance					
Wei Chun-heng	Individual	679	9	Elder (FIJ); W 6–0	Thamwong (THA); L 5–6	Did not advance				
Yu Guan-lin	Individual	655	39	Nesteng (NOR); L 5–6	Did not advance					
Kao Hao-wen; Wei Chun-heng; Yu Guan-lin	Team	1995	7	—N/a		Indonesia; L 2–6	Did not advance			

Women

Athlete	Event	Ranking round		Round of 64	Round of 32	Round of 16	Quarterfinals	Semifinals	Final / BM	
Athlete	Event	Score	Seed	Opposition Score	Opposition Score	Opposition Score	Opposition Score	Opposition Score	Opposition Score	Rank
Le Chien-ying	Individual	625	33	Martín (ESP); W 6–2	Choi M-s (KOR); L 2–6	Did not advance				
Lin Shih-chia	Individual	651	9	Mansour (EGY); W 6–0	Laishram (IND); L 2–6	Did not advance				
Tan Ya-ting	Individual	656	4	Picard (CAN); W 7–1	Pavlova (UKR); W 6–0	Kumari (IND); W 6–0	Unruh (GER); L 5–6	Did not advance		
Le Chien-ying; Lin Shih-chia; Tan Ya-ting	Team	1932	4	—N/a		Bye	Mexico; W 5–4	South Korea; L 1–5	Italy; W 5–3	3rd place, bronze medalist(s)

== Athletics ==
Chinese Taipei athletes have so far achieved qualifying standards in the following athletics events (up to a maximum of 3 athletes in each event):

Key

- Note–Ranks given for track events are within the athlete's heat only
- Q = Qualified for the next round
- q = Qualified for the next round as a fastest loser or, in field events, by position without achieving the qualifying target
- NR = National record
- N/A = Round not applicable for the event
- Bye = Athlete not required to compete in round

Track & road events

Athlete	Event	Heat		Semifinal		Final	
Athlete	Event	Result	Rank	Result	Rank	Result	Rank
Chen Chieh	Men's 400 m hurdles	50.65	6	Did not advance			
Ho Chin-ping	Men's marathon	—N/a				2:26.00	100
Chen Yu-hsuan	Women's marathon	—N/a				3:09:13	127
Hsieh Chien-ho	Women's marathon	—N/a				2:54:18	113

Field events

Athlete	Event	Qualification		Final	
Athlete	Event	Distance	Position	Distance	Position
Hsiang Chun-hsien	Men's high jump	2.17	35	Did not advance	
Huang Shih-feng	Men's javelin throw	74.33	16	Did not advance	

== Badminton ==
Chinese Taipei has qualified four badminton players for each of the following events into the Olympic tournament. World no. 7 seed Chou Tien-chen and London 2012 Olympian Tai Tzu-ying were selected among the top 34 individual shuttlers each in the men's and women's singles, while Lee Sheng-mu and Tsai Chia-hsin secured the men's doubles spot by virtue of their top 16 finish in the BWF World Rankings as of 5 May 2016.

Athlete	Event	Group stage				Elimination	Quarterfinal	Semifinal	Final / BM	
Athlete	Event	Opposition Score	Opposition Score	Opposition Score	Rank	Opposition Score	Opposition Score	Opposition Score	Opposition Score	Rank
Chou Tien-chen	Men's singles	M Zilberman (ISR); W (21–9, 21–11)	—N/a	Y Tan (BEL); W (21–14, 21–8)	1 Q	Hu Y (HKG); W (21–10, 21–13)	Lee C W (MAS); L (9–21, 15–21)	did not advance		
Lee Sheng-mu; Tsai Chia-hsin	Men's doubles	Lee Y-d / Yoo Y-s (KOR); L (21–18, 13–21, 18–21)	V Ivanov / I Sozonov (RUS); L (11–21, 20–22)	M Chau / S Serasinghe (AUS); W (21–14, 21–19)	3	—N/a	did not advance			
Tai Tzu-ying	Women's singles	E Baldauf (AUT); W (21–11, 21–9)	—N/a	N Perminova (RUS); W (21–12, 21–9)	1 Q	P. V. Sindhu (IND); L (13–21, 15–21)	did not advance			

== Boxing ==
Chinese Taipei has entered two boxers to compete in each of the following weight classes into the Olympic boxing tournament, signifying the nation's comeback to the sport since 1996. Chen Nien-chin had claimed her Olympic spot with a quarterfinal victory at the World Championships in Astana, Kazakhstan, while lightweight boxer Lai Chu-en secured an additional Olympic place on the Taiwanese roster at the 2016 AIBA World Qualifying Tournament in Baku, Azerbaijan.

Athlete	Event	Round of 32	Round of 16	Quarterfinals	Semifinals	Final	
Athlete	Event	Opposition Result	Opposition Result	Opposition Result	Opposition Result	Opposition Result	Rank
Lai Chu-en	Men's lightweight	Lacruz (NED); L 1–2	Did not advance				
Chen Nien-chin	Women's middleweight	—N/a	Yakushina (RUS); L 0–3	Did not advance			

== Cycling ==
=== Road ===
Chinese Taipei has qualified one rider in the women's Olympic road race by virtue of a top 100 individual placement in the 2016 UCI World Rankings.

Athlete	Event	Time	Rank
Huang Ting-ying	Women's road race	Did not finish	

=== Track ===
Following the completion of the 2016 UCI Track Cycling World Championships, Chinese Taipei has entered one rider to compete in women's omnium at the Olympics, by virtue of her final individual UCI Olympic ranking in that event.

Omnium

Athlete	Event	Scratch race		Individual pursuit			Elimination race		Time trial			Flying lap			Points race		Total points	Rank
Athlete	Event	Rank	Points	Time	Rank	Points	Rank	Points	Time	Rank	Points	Time	Rank	Points	Points	Rank	Total points	Rank
Hsiao Mei-yu	Women's omnium	13	16	3:58.713	18	6	13	16	35.636	7	28	14.532	12	18	−20	18	64	17

== Equestrian ==
Chinese Taipei has entered one jumping rider into the Olympic equestrian competition, by virtue of a top individual finish at the FEI qualifying meet for Asia & Oceania in Hagen, Germany.

=== Jumping ===
Athlete	Horse	Event	Qualification								Final					Total	
Athlete	Horse	Event	Round 1		Round 2			Round 3			Round A		Round B			Total	
Athlete	Horse	Event	Penalties	Rank	Penalties	Total	Rank	Penalties	Total	Rank	Penalties	Rank	Penalties	Total	Rank	Penalties	Rank
Isheau Wong	Zadarijke	Individual	47	=68	Did not advance												

== Golf ==
Chinese Taipei has entered four golfers (two per gender) into the Olympic tournament. Lin Wen-tang (world no. 315), Pan Cheng-tsung (world no. 256), Candie Kung (world no. 32) and Teresa Lu (world no. 28) qualified directly among the top 60 eligible players for their respective individual events based on the IGF World Rankings as of 11 July 2016.

Athlete	Event	Round 1	Round 2	Round 3	Round 4	Total		
Athlete	Event	Score	Score	Score	Score	Score	Par	Rank
Lin Wen-tang	Men's	77	77	DNF	DNF	154	12	DNF
Pan Cheng-tsung	Men's	69	69	71	74	283	−1	=30
Candie Kung	Women's	67	68	76	75	286	+2	=31
Teresa Lu	Women's	70	67	73	70	280	−4	=16

== Gymnastics ==
=== Artistic ===
Chinese Taipei has entered one artistic gymnast into the Olympic competition for the first time since 2000. Lee Chih-kai had claimed his Olympic spot in the men's apparatus and all-around events at the Olympic Test Event in Rio de Janeiro.

Men

Athlete	Event	Qualification								Final							
Athlete	Event	Apparatus						Total	Rank	Apparatus						Total	Rank
Athlete	Event	F	PH	R	V	PB	HB	Total	Rank	F	PH	R	V	PB	HB	Total	Rank
Lee Chih-kai	Pommel horse	—N/a	14.266	—N/a				14.266	31	Did not advance							

== Judo ==
Chinese Taipei has qualified two judokas for each of the following weight classes at the Games. Lien Chia-ling was ranked among the top 14 eligible judokas for women in the IJF World Ranking List of 30 May 2016, while Tsai Ming-yen at men's extra-lightweight (60 kg) earned a continental quota spot from the Asian region as Chinese Taipei's top-ranked judoka outside of direct qualifying position.

Athlete	Event	Round of 64	Round of 32	Round of 16	Quarterfinals	Semifinals	Repechage	Final / BM	
Athlete	Event	Opposition Result	Opposition Result	Opposition Result	Opposition Result	Opposition Result	Opposition Result	Opposition Result	Rank
Tsai Ming-yen	Men's −60 kg	Sithisane (LAO); W 111–000	Gerchev (BUL); L 000–110	Did not advance					
Lien Chen-ling	Women's −57 kg	—N/a	Podolak (POL); W 100–000	Malloy (USA); W 000–000 S	Căprioriu (ROU); L 000–100	Did not advance	Karakas (HUN); W 001–000	Matsumoto (JPN); L 000–001	5

== Rowing ==
Chinese Taipei has qualified one boat in the women's single sculls for the Olympics at the 2016 Asia & Oceania Continental Qualification Regatta in Chungju, South Korea.

Athlete	Event	Heats		Repechage		Quarterfinals		Semifinals		Final	
Athlete	Event	Time	Rank	Time	Rank	Time	Rank	Time	Rank	Time	Rank
Huang Yi-ting	Women's single sculls	8:51.74	4 R	8:01.27	3 SE/F	Bye		8:38.21	1 FE	8:34.53	25

Qualification Legend: FA=Final A (medal); FB=Final B (non-medal); FC=Final C (non-medal); FD=Final D (non-medal); FE=Final E (non-medal); FF=Final F (non-medal); SA/B=Semifinals A/B; SC/D=Semifinals C/D; SE/F=Semifinals E/F; QF=Quarterfinals; R=Repechage

== Sailing ==
Chinese Taipei has received a spare Olympic berth from the International Sailing Federation to send a windsurfer competing in the men's RS:X class to the Olympic regatta.

Athlete	Event	Race													Net points	Final rank
Athlete	Event	1	2	3	4	5	6	7	8	9	10	11	12	M*	Net points	Final rank
Chang Hao	Men's RS:X	34	34	31	27	~~37~~; DNF	34	35	37; DNF	31	28	27	28	EL	346	32

M = Medal race; EL = Eliminated – did not advance into the medal race

== Shooting ==
Taiwanese shooters have achieved quota places for the following events by virtue of their best finishes at the 2014 and 2015 ISSF World Championships, the 2015 ISSF World Cup series, and Asian Championships, as long as they obtained a minimum qualifying score (MQS) as of 31 March 2016. The shooting team was named to the Olympic roster on 9 June 2016, with trap specialist Lin Yi-chun going to her fourth Games.

Athlete	Event	Qualification		Semifinal		Final	
Athlete	Event	Points	Rank	Points	Rank	Points	Rank
Yang Kun-pi	Men's trap	110	25	Did not advance			
Lin Yi-chun	Women's trap	62	17	Did not advance			
Wu Chia-ying	Women's 10 m air pistol	380	19	—N/a		Did not advance	
Wu Chia-ying	Women's 25 m pistol	572	27	Did not advance			
Yu Ai-wen	Women's 10 m air pistol	378	31	—N/a		Did not advance	
Yu Ai-wen	Women's 25 m pistol	577	18	Did not advance			

Qualification Legend: Q = Qualify for the next round; q = Qualify for the bronze medal (shotgun)

== Swimming ==
Chinese Taipei has received a Universality invitation from FINA to send two swimmers (one male and one female) to the Olympics.

Athlete	Event	Heat		Semifinal		Final	
Athlete	Event	Time	Rank	Time	Rank	Time	Rank
Lee Hsuan-yen	Men's 200 m breaststroke	2:14.84	34	Did not advance			
Lin Pei-wun	Women's 50 m freestyle	26.41	49	Did not advance			

== Table tennis ==
Chinese Taipei has fielded a team of six athletes into the table tennis competition at the Games. Chen Chien-an scored a second-stage draw victory to book one of six remaining Olympic spots in the men's singles at the Asian Qualification Tournament in Hong Kong. Meanwhile, London 2012 semifinalist Chuang Chih-yuan, Chen Szu-yu, and Cheng I-ching were automatically selected among the top 22 eligible players each in their respective singles events based on the ITTF Olympic Rankings.

Chiang Hung-chieh and Huang Yi-hua were each awarded the third spot to build the men's and women's teams for the Games by virtue of a top 10 national finish in the ITTF Olympic Rankings.

Men

Athlete	Event	Preliminary	Round 1	Round 2	Round 3	Round of 16	Quarterfinals	Semifinals	Final / BM	
Athlete	Event	Opposition Result	Opposition Result	Opposition Result	Opposition Result	Opposition Result	Opposition Result	Opposition Result	Opposition Result	Rank
Chen Chien-an	Singles	Bye		He Zw (ESP); W 4–2	Zhang Jk (CHN); L 0–4	Did not advance				
Chuang Chih-yuan	Singles	Bye			Aruna (NGR); L 0–4	Did not advance				
Chen Chien-an; Chiang Hung-chieh; Chuang Chih-yuan	Team	—N/a				Germany; L 1–3	Did not advance			

Women

Athlete	Event	Preliminary	Round 1	Round 2	Round 3	Round of 16	Quarterfinals	Semifinals	Final / BM	
Athlete	Event	Opposition Result	Opposition Result	Opposition Result	Opposition Result	Opposition Result	Opposition Result	Opposition Result	Opposition Result	Rank
Chen Szu-yu	Singles	Bye		Privalova (BLR); W 4–2	Hu (TUR); W 4–0	Kim S-i (PRK); L 2–4	did not advance			
Cheng I-ching	Singles	Bye			Pavlovich (BLR); W 4–3	Seo H-w (KOR); W 4–3	Li Xx (CHN); L 0–4	Did not advance		
Chen Szu-yu; Cheng I-ching; Huang Yi-hua	Team	—N/a				Hong Kong; L 1–3	Did not advance			

== Taekwondo ==
Chinese Taipei entered three athletes into the taekwondo competition at the Olympics. Chuang Chia-chia qualified automatically for the women's welterweight category (67 kg) by finishing in the top 6 WTF Olympic rankings. Meanwhile, 2015 World champion Liu Wei-ting and Huang Huai-hsuan secured the remaining spots on the Chinese Taipei team by virtue of their top two finish respectively in the men's welterweight (80 kg) and women's flyweight category (49 kg) at the 2016 Asian Qualification Tournament in Manila, Philippines.

Athlete	Event	Round of 16	Quarterfinals	Semifinals	Repechage	Final / BM	
Athlete	Event	Opposition Result	Opposition Result	Opposition Result	Opposition Result	Opposition Result	Rank
Liu Wei-ting	Men's −80 kg	Cook (MDA); W 14–2 PTG	Oueslati (TUN); L 0–1 SUD	Did not advance			
Huang Huai-hsuan	Women's −49 kg	Wu Jy (CHN); L 1–10	Did not advance				
Chuang Chia-chia	Women's −67 kg	Deniz (KAZ); W 16–2 PTG	Oh H-r (KOR); L 9–21 PTG	Did not advance	Pagnotta (CAN); W 4–1	Tatar (TUR); L 3–7	5

== Tennis ==
Chinese Taipei has entered five tennis players into the Olympic tournament. Three-time Olympian Lu Yen-hsun (world no. 97) and Hsieh Su-wei (world no. 72), qualified directly among the top 56 eligible players for their respective singles events based on the ATP and WTA World Rankings as of 6 June 2016.

Having been directly entered to the singles, Hsieh also opted to play with her partner Chuang Chia-jung in the women's doubles, while sisters Chan Hao-ching and Chan Yung-jan teamed up together in the same tournament by virtue of the former's top-10 WTA ranking.

Hsieh was scheduled to play in the women's singles and the women's doubles (partnered with Chuang), but withdrew before the tournament, leaving Chuang unable to play and find another partner that have an enough rank to play with.

Athlete	Event	Round of 64	Round of 32	Round of 16	Quarterfinals	Semifinals	Final / BM	
Athlete	Event	Opposition Score	Opposition Score	Opposition Score	Opposition Score	Opposition Score	Opposition Score	Rank
Lu Yen-hsun	Men's singles	Lorenzi (ITA); L 6–3, 3–6, 4–6	Did not advance					
Hsieh Su-wei	Women's singles	Withdrew on 4 August due to scheduling issues						
Chan Hao-ching; Chan Yung-jan	Women's doubles	—N/a	Begu / Niculescu (ROU); W 5–7, 6–4, 6–3	Konta / Watson (GBR); W 3–6, 6–0, 6–4	Bacsinszky / Hingis (SUI); L 3–6, 0–6	Did not advance		
Chuang Chia-jung; Hsieh Su-wei	Women's doubles	Withdrew on 4 August due to scheduling issues						

== Weightlifting ==
Weightlifters from Chinese Taipei have qualified three men's and four women's quota places for the Rio Olympics based on their combined team standing by points at the 2014 and 2015 IWF World Championships. The team must allocate these places to individual athletes by 20 June 2016.

The weightlifting team, highlighted by London 2012 silver medalist Hsu Shu-ching (later granted the gold medal because of the original champion's positive blood test result for the banned steroids), was named to the Olympic roster on 11 May 2016.

Athlete	Event	Snatch		Clean & jerk		Total	Rank
Athlete	Event	Result	Rank	Result	Rank	Total	Rank
Tan Chi-chung	Men's −56 kg	110	14	138	11	248	12
Pan Chien-hung	Men's −69 kg	136	19	160	18	296	18
Chen Shih-chieh	Men's +105 kg	185	10	~~235~~	DNF	185	DNF
Chen Wei-ling	Women's −48 kg	81	7	100	6	181	7
Hsu Shu-ching	Women's −53 kg	100	2	112	1	212	1st place, gold medalist(s)
Kuo Hsing-chun	Women's −58 kg	102	3	129	3	231	3rd place, bronze medalist(s)

== Wrestling ==
Chinese Taipei has qualified one wrestler for the women's freestyle 69 kg into the Olympic competition, as a result of her top two finish at the 2016 Asian Qualification Tournament, signifying the nation's Olympic comeback to the sport for the first time since 1988.

Key:

- VT – Victory by Fall.
- PP – Decision by Points – the loser with technical points.
- PO – Decision by Points – the loser without technical points.
- ST – Great superiority – the loser without technical points and a margin of victory of at least 8 (Greco-Roman) or 10 (freestyle) points.

Women's freestyle

Athlete	Event	Qualification	Round of 16	Quarterfinal	Semifinal	Repechage 1	Repechage 2	Final / BM	
Athlete	Event	Opposition Result	Opposition Result	Opposition Result	Opposition Result	Opposition Result	Opposition Result	Opposition Result	Rank
Chen Wen-ling	−69 kg	Bye	Ochirbat (MGL); L 0–5 ^{VT}	Did not advance					15

== See also ==
- Chinese Taipei at the 2016 Summer Paralympics
