= Weightlifting at the 2016 Summer Olympics – Women's 53 kg =

Women's 53 kg at the Games of the XXXI Olympiad
- Venue: Riocentro
- Date: 7 August 2016
- Competitors: 13 from 13 nations
- Winning total: 212 kg

Medalists
1st place, gold medalist(s)		Hsu Shu-ching	Chinese Taipei
2nd place, silver medalist(s)		Hidilyn Diaz	Philippines
3rd place, bronze medalist(s)		Yoon Jin-hee	South Korea

The Women's 53 kg weightlifting competitions at the 2016 Summer Olympics in Rio de Janeiro took place on 7 August at the Pavilion 2 of Riocentro.

== Schedule ==
All times are Time in Brazil (UTC-03:00)

Date	Time	Event
7 August 2016	12:30	Group B
7 August 2016	15:30	Group A

== Records ==
Prior to this competition, the existing world and Olympic records were as follows.

World record	Snatch	Li Ping (CHN)	103 kg	Guangzhou, China	14 November 2010
World record	Clean & Jerk	Zulfiya Chinshanlo (KAZ)	134 kg	Almaty, Kazakhstan	10 November 2014
World record	Total	Hsu Shu-ching (TPE)	233 kg	Incheon, South Korea	21 September 2014
Olympic record	Snatch	Yang Xia (CHN)	100 kg	Sydney, Australia	18 September 2000
Olympic record	Clean & Jerk	Zulfiya Chinshanlo (KAZ)	131 kg	London, England	27 July 2012
Olympic record	Total	Zulfiya Chinshanlo (KAZ)	226 kg	London, England	27 July 2012

== Results ==
Rank	Athlete	Nation	Group	Body weight	Snatch (kg)				Clean & Jerk (kg)				Total
Rank	Athlete	Nation	Group	Body weight	1	2	3	Result	1	2	3	Result	Total
1st place, gold medalist(s)	Hsu Shu-ching	Chinese Taipei	A	52.60	92	96	100	100	112	~~126~~		112	212
2nd place, silver medalist(s)	Hidilyn Diaz	Philippines	A	52.61	~~88~~	88	~~91~~	88	111	112	~~117~~	112	200
3rd place, bronze medalist(s)	Yoon Jin-hee	South Korea	A	52.59	88	~~90~~	~~90~~	88	~~110~~	110	111	111	199
4	Rebeka Koha	Latvia	A	52.11	~~87~~	87	90	90	103	107	~~110~~	107	197
5	Rosane Santos	Brazil	A	52.57	85	~~90~~	90	90	103	~~107~~	~~108~~	103	193
6	Kanae Yagi	Japan	B	52.39	~~81~~	~~81~~	81	81	~~101~~	101	105	105	186
7	Dewi Safitri	Indonesia	A	52.78	~~80~~	~~80~~	80	80	~~105~~	105	~~108~~	105	185
8	Evagjelia Veli	Albania	B	51.58	68	72	75	75	88	90	~~96~~	90	165
9	Lely Burgos	Puerto Rico	B	49.53	67	70	72	72	85	88	90	90	162
10	Scarleth Mercado	Nicaragua	B	52.85	62	66	~~68~~	66	83	86	89	89	155
11	Fiorella Cueva	Peru	B	48.32	62	65	~~67~~	65	85	88	~~90~~	88	153
12	Sofía Rito	Uruguay	B	51.74	~~64~~	64	~~67~~	64	~~82~~	82	~~88~~	82	146
–	Li Yajun	China	A	52.50	98	101	~~104~~	101 OR	~~123~~	~~126~~	~~126~~	–	–

== New records ==
Snatch	101 kg	Li Yajun (CHN)	OR
