= India at the 2016 Summer Olympics =

- IOC code: IND
- NOC: Indian Olympic Association
- Website: olympic.ind.in

in Rio de Janeiro
- Competitors: 117 in 15 sports
- Flag bearers: Abhinav Bindra (opening); Sakshi Malik (closing)
- Medals Ranked 67th: Gold 0 Silver 1 Bronze 1 Total 2

Summer Olympics appearances (overview)
- 1900; 1904–1912; 1920; 1924; 1928; 1932; 1936; 1948; 1952; 1956; 1960; 1964; 1968; 1972; 1976; 1980; 1984; 1988; 1992; 1996; 2000; 2004; 2008; 2012; 2016; 2020; 2024; 2028

Other related appearances
- Pakistan (1948–pres.); Bangladesh (1984–pres.)

India competed at the 2016 Summer Olympics in Rio de Janeiro, Brazil, from 5 to 21 August 2016. Indian athletes have appeared in every edition of the Summer Olympics since 1920, although they made their official debut at the 1900 Summer Olympics in Paris.

117 Indian athletes participated in Rio 2016, 63 men and 54 women, across 15 sports at the Games. It was one of the nation's largest ever delegations sent to the Olympics, due to the historic comeback of the women's field hockey squad after 36 years and the proliferation of track and field athletes making the cut. Among the sporting events represented by its athletes, India made its Olympic debut in golf (new to the 2016 Games) and women's artistic gymnastics.

The Indian roster featured three Olympic medalists from London, including badminton star Saina Nehwal, freestyle wrestler and four-time Olympian Yogeshwar Dutt, and rifle shooter Gagan Narang. Tennis ace and 1996 bronze medalist Leander Paes topped the roster lineup by competing at his record seventh Olympics, while air rifle marksman Abhinav Bindra, who became the nation's first and only individual gold medalist in history (2008), led the Indian delegation as the flag bearer in the opening ceremony at his fifth consecutive Games. Other notable Indian athletes also included tennis player Sania Mirza in the women's doubles, artistic gymnast and Commonwealth Games bronze medalist Dipa Karmakar, and multiple-time world medalist Jitu Rai in men's pistol shooting.

India left Rio de Janeiro with two medals. These medals were won only by female athletes for the first time in history, a silver to badminton player P. V. Sindhu in the women's singles, who became India's youngest individual Olympic medallist and the first Indian woman to win an Olympic silver, as well as a bronze to freestyle wrestler Sakshi Malik in the women's 58 kg, who became the first female wrestler from India to win an Olympic medal. Several Indian athletes came close to increasing the medal haul, finishing in fourth place, including tennis tandem Mirza and Rohan Bopanna in the mixed doubles; Bindra, who narrowly missed out the podium by a half-point in the men's 10 m air rifle before retiring from the sport; and Karmakar, who surprised the global audience with her high-risk Produnova routine in the women's vault. For the first time, the Indian shooters failed to earn a single medal since 2004, and the boxers since 2008.

== Medalists ==
Medal	Name	Sport	Event	Date
Silver	P. V. Sindhu	Badminton	Women's singles	August 19
Bronze	Sakshi Malik	Wrestling	Women's freestyle 58 kg	August 17

Medals by sport
Sport	Gold	Silver	Bronze	Total
Badminton	0	1	0	1
Wrestling	0	0	1	1
Total	0	1	1	2

Medals by gender
Gender	Gold	Silver	Bronze	Total
Male	0	0	0	0
Female	0	1	1	2
Total	0	1	1	2

== Competitors ==
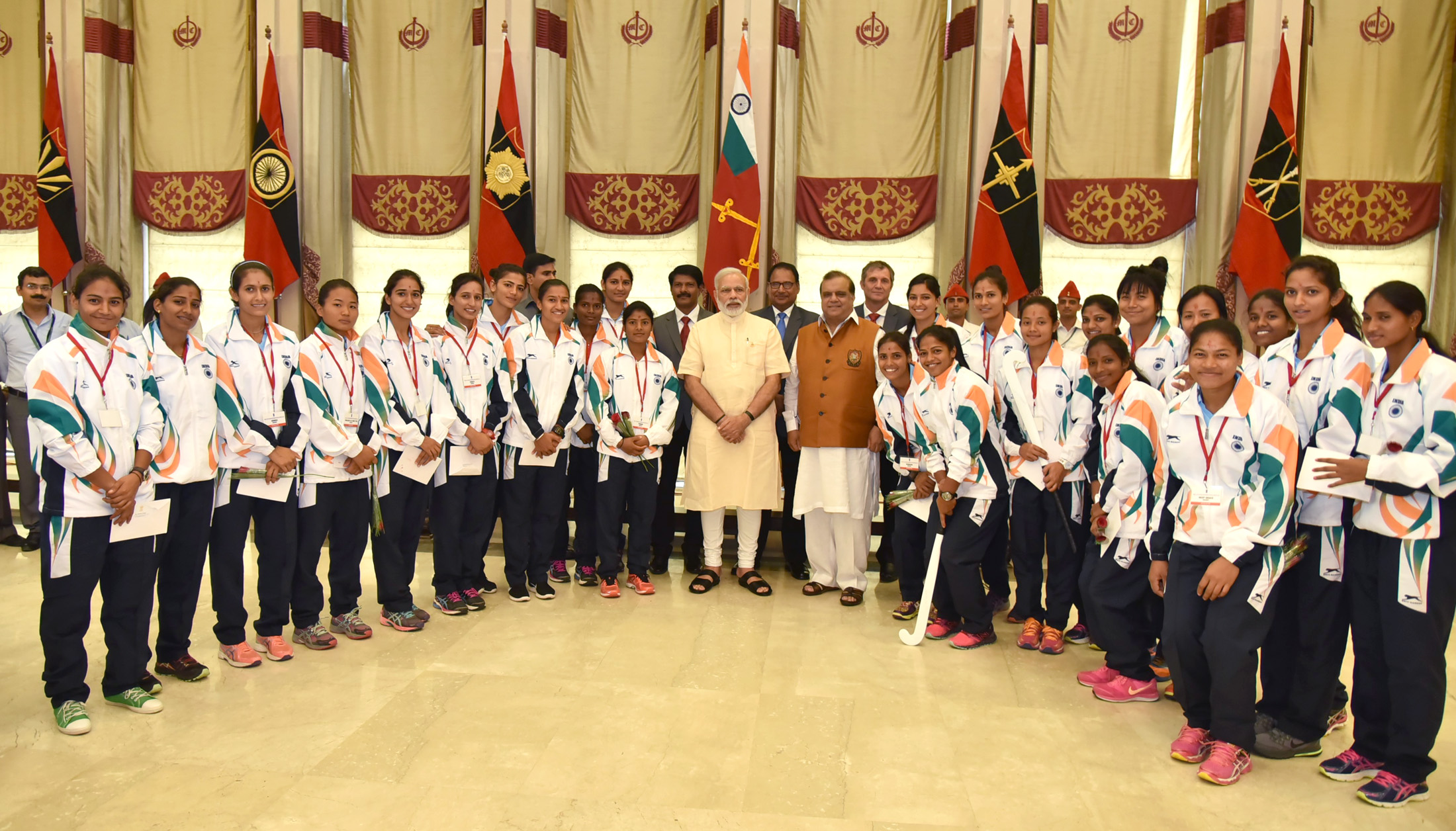
Athletes representing India with Prime Minister Narendra Modi on 4 July 2016.

The following is the list of number of competitors participating in the Games. Note that reserves in fencing, field hockey, football, and handball are not counted as athletes:

Sports	Men	Women	Total
Archery	1	3	4
Athletics	17	17	34
Badminton	3	4	7
Boxing	3	0	3
Field hockey	16	16	32
Golf	2	1	3
Gymnastics	0	1	1
Judo	1	0	1
Rowing	1	0	1
Shooting	9	3	12
Swimming	1	1	2
Table tennis	2	2	4
Tennis	2	2	4
Weightlifting	1	1	2
Wrestling	4	3	7
Total	63	54	117

== Archery ==
Three Indian women's archers & One Indian men's archer qualified after having secured top eight finishes in the women's team recurve event & men's individual event at the 2015 World Archery Championships in Copenhagen, Denmark.

Athlete	Event	Ranking round		Round of 64	Round of 32	Round of 16	Quarterfinals	Semifinals	Final / BM	
Athlete	Event	Score	Seed	Opposition Score	Opposition Score	Opposition Score	Opposition Score	Opposition Score	Opposition Score	Rank
Atanu Das	Men's individual	683	5	Muktan (NEP); W 6–0	Puentes (CUB); W 6–4	Lee S-y (KOR); L 4–6	Did not advance			
Bombayla Devi	Women's individual	638	24	Baldauff (AUT); W 6–2	Lin S-c (TPE); W 6–2	Valencia (MEX); L 2–6	Did not advance			
Deepika Kumari	Women's individual	640	20	Esebua (GEO); W 6–4	Guendalina (ITA); W 6–2	Tan Y-t (TPE); L 0–6	Did not advance			
Laxmirani Majhi	Women's individual	614	43	Longová (SVK); L 1–7	Did not advance					
Deepika Kumari; Bombayla Devi; Laxmirani Majhi	Women's team	1892	7	—N/a		Colombia; W 5–3	Russia; L 4–5	Did not advance		

== Athletics ==
Indian athletes have been able to achieve qualifying standard in the following athletic events (up to maximum of 3 athletes in each event)

Indian shot putter Inderjeet Singh and 200 metres sprinter Dharambir Singh were suspended from participating in the Olympics after having failed both of the administered doping tests.

Key

- Note–Ranks given for track events are within the athlete's heat only
- Q = Qualified for the next round
- q = Qualified for the next round as a fastest loser or, in field events, by position without achieving the qualifying target
- NR = National record
- SB = Seasonal best
- N/A = Round not applicable for the event
- Bye = Athlete not required to compete in round

Track & road events
Men

Athlete	Event	Heat		Semifinal		Final	
Athlete	Event	Result	Rank	Result	Rank	Result	Rank
Muhammad Anas	400 m	45.95	6	Did not advance			
Jinson Johnson	800 m	1:47.27	5	Did not advance			
Mohammad Anas; Ayyasamy Dharun; Lalit Mathur*; Kunhu Muhammed; Mohan Kumar Raja*; Arokia Rajiv	4 × 400 m relay	DSQ		—N/a		Did not advance	
Thonakal Gopi	Marathon	—N/a				2:15:25 PB	25
Kheta Ram	Marathon	—N/a				2:15:26 PB	26
Nitendra Singh Rawat	Marathon	—N/a				2:22:52	84
Ganapathi Krishnan	20 km walk	—N/a				DSQ	
Manish Singh	20 km walk	—N/a				1:21.21	13
Gurmeet Singh	20 km walk	—N/a				DSQ	
Sandeep Kumar	50 km walk	—N/a				4:07:55	35

* Reserves in the relay team.

Women

Athlete	Event	Heat		Semifinal		Final	
Athlete	Event	Result	Rank	Result	Rank	Result	Rank
Dutee Chand	100 m	11.69	7	Did not advance			
Srabani Nanda	200 m	23.58	6	Did not advance			
Nirmala Sheoran	400 m	53.03	6	Did not advance			
Tintu Lukka	800 m	2:00.58	6	Did not advance			
Lalita Babar	3000 m steeplechase	9:19.76 NR	4 q	—N/a		9:22.74	10
Sudha Singh	3000 m steeplechase	9:43.29	9	—N/a		Did not advance	
Ashwini Akkunji*; Tintu Lukka; Jisna Mathew*; Debashree Mazumdar*; M. R. Poovamma; Nirmala Sheoran; Anilda Thomas	4 × 400 m relay	3:29.53	7	—N/a		Did not advance	
O. P. Jaisha	Marathon	—N/a				2:47:19	89
Kavita Raut	Marathon	—N/a				2:59:29	120
Khushbir Kaur	20 km walk	—N/a				1:40:33	54
Sapna Punia	20 km walk	—N/a				Did not finish	

* Reserves in the relay team.

Field events

Athlete	Event	Qualification		Final	
Athlete	Event	Distance	Position	Distance	Position
Ankit Sharma	Men's long jump	7.67	24	Did not advance	
Renjith Maheshwary	Men's triple jump	16.13	30	Did not advance	
Vikas Gowda	Men's discus throw	58.99	28	Did not advance	
Manpreet Kaur	Women's shot put	17.06	23	Did not advance	
Seema Antil	Women's discus throw	57.58	20	Did not advance	

== Badminton ==
Seven badminton players from India qualified for the Olympics for each of the following events based on their BWF World Rankings as of 5 May 2016:

Men

Athlete	Event	Group stage				Elimination	Quarterfinal	Semifinal	Final / BM	
Athlete	Event	Opposition Score	Opposition Score	Opposition Score	Rank	Opposition Score	Opposition Score	Opposition Score	Opposition Score	Rank
Srikanth Kidambi	Singles	Muñoz (MEX); W (21–11, 21–17)	Hurskainen (SWE); W (21–6, 21–18)	—N/a	1 Q	Jørgensen (DEN); W (21–19, 21–19)	Lin D (CHN); L (6–21, 21–11, 18–21)	Did not advance		
Manu Attri; B. Sumeeth Reddy	Doubles	Ahsan / Setiawan (INA); L (18–21, 13–21)	Chai B / Hong W (CHN); L (13–21, 15–21)	Endo / Hayakawa (JPN); W (23–21, 21–11)	4	—N/a	Did not advance			

Women

Athlete	Event	Group stage				Elimination	Quarterfinal	Semifinal	Final / BM	
Athlete	Event	Opposition Score	Opposition Score	Opposition Score	Rank	Opposition Score	Opposition Score	Opposition Score	Opposition Score	Rank
Saina Nehwal	Singles	Vicente (BRA); W (21–17, 21–17)	Ulitina (UKR); L (18–21, 19–21)	—N/a	2	Did not advance				
P. V. Sindhu	Singles	Sárosi (HUN); W (21–8, 21–9)	Li (CAN); W (19–21, 21–15, 21–17)	—N/a	1 Q	Tai T-y (TPE); W (21–13, 21–15)	Wang YH (CHN); W (22–20, 21–19)	Okuhara (JPN); W (21–19, 21–10)	Marín (ESP); L (21–19, 12–21, 15–21)	2nd place, silver medalist(s)
Jwala Gutta; Ashwini Ponnappa	Doubles	Matsutomo / Takahashi (JPN); L (15–21, 10–21)	Muskens / Piek (NED); L (16–21, 21–16, 17–21)	Supajirakul / Taerattanachai (THA); L (17–21, 15–21)	4	—N/a	Did not advance			

== Boxing ==
India has entered three boxers to compete in each of the following classes into the Olympic boxing tournament. London 2012 Olympian Shiva Thapa had claimed his Olympic spot with a semifinal victory at the 2016 Asia & Oceania Qualification Tournament in Qian'an, China, while Manoj Kumar and Vikas Krishan Yadav secured additional places on the Indian roster with their quarterfinal triumphs at the 2016 AIBA World Qualifying Tournament in Baku, Azerbaijan.

Athlete	Event	Round of 32	Round of 16	Quarterfinals	Semifinals	Final	
Athlete	Event	Opposition Result	Opposition Result	Opposition Result	Opposition Result	Opposition Result	Rank
Shiva Thapa	Men's bantamweight	Ramírez (CUB); L 0–3	Did not advance				
Manoj Kumar	Men's light welterweight	Petrauskas (LTU); W 2–1	Gaibnazarov (UZB); L 0–3	Did not advance			
Vikas Krishan Yadav	Men's middleweight	Conwell (USA); W 3–0	Şipal (TUR); W 3–0	Melikuziev (UZB); L 0–3	Did not advance		

== Field hockey ==
Summary

Key:

- FT – After full time.
- P – Match decided by penalty-shootout.

Team	Event	Group stage						Quarterfinal	Semifinal	Final / BM	
Team	Event	Opposition Score	Opposition Score	Opposition Score	Opposition Score	Opposition Score	Rank	Opposition Score	Opposition Score	Opposition Score	Rank
India men's	Men's tournament	Ireland; W 3–2	Germany; L 1–2	Argentina; W 2–1	Netherlands; L 1–2	Canada; D 2–2	4	Belgium; L 1–3	Did not advance		8
India women's	Women's tournament	Japan; D 2–2	Great Britain; L 0–3	Australia; L 1–6	United States; L 0–3	Argentina; L 0–5	6	Did not advance			12

=== Men's tournament ===
India men's field hockey team qualified for the Olympics by receiving a berth and earning the gold medal from the 2014 Asian Games in Incheon.

Team roster

The following is the India roster in the men's field hockey tournament of the 2016 Summer Olympics.

Head coach: Roelant Oltmans

1. Harmanpreet Singh
3. Rupinder Pal Singh
5. Kothajit Singh
6. Surender Kumar
7. Manpreet Singh
8. Sardara Singh
12. V. R. Raghunath
15. S. K. Uthappa
16. P. R. Sreejesh (C & GK)
17. Danish Mujtaba
22. Devinder Walmiki
24. S. V. Sunil
27. Akashdeep Singh
29. Chinglensana Singh
31. Ramandeep Singh
32. Nikkin Thimmaiah

Reserves:

- Vikas Dahiya
- Pardeep Mor

Group play

Pos	Team	Pld	W	D	L	GF	GA	GD	Pts	Qualification
1	Germany	5	4	1	0	17	10	+7	13	Quarter-finals
2	Netherlands	5	3	1	1	18	6	+12	10	Quarter-finals
3	Argentina	5	2	2	1	14	12	+2	8	Quarter-finals
4	India	5	2	1	2	9	9	0	7	Quarter-finals
5	Ireland	5	1	0	4	10	16	−6	3	
6	Canada	5	0	1	4	7	22	−15	1	

Source: Rio2016
Rules for classification: 1) Points; 2) Matches won; 3) Goal difference; 4) Goals for; 5) Head-to-head result.

6 August 2016
11:00

India	3–2	Ireland
Raghunath 15+'; Ru. Singh 27', 49'	Report	Shimmins 45'; Harte 56'

Umpires:
Murray Grime (AUS)
Paco Vázquez (ESP)

8 August 2016
11:00

Germany	2–1	India
Wellen 18'; Rühr 60'	Report	Ru. Singh 23'

Umpires:
Tim Pullman (AUS)
Martin Madden (GBR)

9 August 2016
11:00

Argentina	1–2	India
Peillat 49'	Report	C. Singh 8'; K. Singh 35'

Umpires:
Paco Vázquez (ESP)
Simon Taylor (NZL)

11 August 2016
10:00

Netherlands	2–1	India
Hofman 35'; Van der Weerden 54'	Report	Raghunath 38'

Umpires:
Murray Grime (AUS)
Martin Madden (GBR)

12 August 2016
12:30

India	2–2	Canada
A. Singh 33'; Ra. Singh 41'	Report	Tupper 33', 52'

Umpires:
Nathan Stagno (GBR)
Adam Kearns (AUS)

Quarterfinal

14 August 2016
12:30

Belgium	3–1	India
Dockier 34', 45'; Boon 50'	Report	A. Singh 15'

Umpires:
Simon Taylor (NZL)
Nathan Stagno (GBR)

=== Women's tournament ===
India women's field hockey team qualified for the Olympics by having achieved a top five finish at the 2014–15 Women's FIH Hockey World League Semifinals, signifying its historic Olympic comeback after 36 years.

Team roster

The following is the Indian roster in the women's field hockey tournament of the 2016 Summer Olympics.

Head coach: Neil Hawgood

1. Navjot Kaur
3. Deep Grace Ekka
4. Monika Malik
8. Nikki Pradhan
10. Anuradha Devi
11. Savita Punia (GK)
15. Poonam Rani
16. Vandana Kataria
17. Deepika Thakur
19. Namita Toppo
24. Renuka Yadav
26. Sunita Lakra
27. Sushila Chanu (C)
28. Rani Rampal
30. Preeti Dubey
31. Lilima Minz

Reserves:

- Rajani Etimarpu

Group play

Pos	Team	Pld	W	D	L	GF	GA	GD	Pts	Qualification
1	Great Britain	5	5	0	0	12	4	+8	15	Quarter-finals
2	United States	5	4	0	1	14	5	+9	12	Quarter-finals
3	Australia	5	3	0	2	11	5	+6	9	Quarter-finals
4	Argentina	5	2	0	3	12	6	+6	6	Quarter-finals
5	Japan	5	0	1	4	3	16	−13	1	
6	India	5	0	1	4	3	19	−16	1	

Source: Rio2016
Rules for classification: 1) Points; 2) Matches won; 3) Goal difference; 4) Goals for; 5) Head-to-head result.

7 August 2016
11:00

Japan	2–2	India
Nishikori 15'; Nakashima 28'	Report	Rani 31'; Minz 40'

Umpires:
Kylie Seymour (AUS)
Kelly Hudson (NZL)

8 August 2016
18:00

India	0–3	Great Britain
	Report	Ansley 25'; White 27'; Danson 33'

Umpires:
Chieko Soma (JPN)
Amy Baxter (USA)

10 August 2016
11:00

India	1–6	Australia
Thokchom 60'	Report	Slattery 5'; Morgan 9'; Claxton 35'; Parker 36'; Kenny 43', 46'

Umpires:
Soledad Iparraguiree (ARG)
Sarah Wilson (GBR)

11 August 2016
19:30

United States	3–0	India
Bam 14', 42'; González 52'	Report

Umpires:
Melissa Trivic (AUS)
Chieko Soma (JPN)

13 August 2016
10:00

Argentina	5–0	India
Cavallero 16', 29'; Granatto 23'; Rebecchi 26'; Albertarrio 27'	Report

Umpires:
Chieko Soma (JPN)
Sarah Wilson (GBR)

== Golf ==
India has entered three golfers into the Olympic. Anirban Lahiri (Rank 62), Shiv Chawrasia (Rank 207), and Aditi Ashok (Rank 444) qualified directly among top 60 players for their respective individual events based on IGF World Rankings as of 11 July 2016.

Athlete	Event	Round 1	Round 2	Round 3	Round 4	Total		
Athlete	Event	Score	Score	Score	Score	Score	Par	Rank
Shiv Chawrasia	Men's	71	71	69	78	289	+5	=50
Anirban Lahiri	Men's	74	73	75	72	294	+10	57
Aditi Ashok	Women's	68	68	79	76	291	+7	41

== Gymnastics ==
=== Artistic ===
India has qualified one artistic gymnast into the Olympic competition for the first time since 1964. Dipa Karmakar became the first Indian female ever to book an Olympic spot in the apparatus (vault, balance beam, uneven bars and floor exercise) events and all-around event at the Olympic Test Event in Rio de Janeiro.

Women

Athlete	Event	Qualification						Final					
Athlete	Event	Apparatus				Total	Rank	Apparatus				Total	Rank
Athlete	Event	V	UB	BB	F	Total	Rank	V	UB	BB	F	Total	Rank
Dipa Karmakar	All-around	15.100	11.666	12.866	12.033	51.665	51	Did not advance					
Dipa Karmakar	Vault	14.850	—N/a			14.850	8 Q	15.066	—N/a			15.066	4

== Judo ==
India has qualified one judoka for men's middleweight category (90 kg) for the olympic. Avtar Singh earned a continental quota from the Asian region, as the highest-ranked Indian judoka outside of direct qualifying position in the IJF World Ranking List of 30 May 2016.

Athlete	Event	Round of 64	Round of 32	Round of 16	Quarterfinals	Semifinals	Repechage	Final / BM	
Athlete	Event	Opposition Result	Opposition Result	Opposition Result	Opposition Result	Opposition Result	Opposition Result	Opposition Result	Rank
Avtar Singh	Men's −90 kg	Bye	Misenga (ROT); L 000–001	Did not advance					

== Rowing ==
India has qualified one boat in the men's single sculls for the Olympics at the 2016 Asia & Oceania Continental Qualification Regatta in Chungju, South Korea.

Athlete	Event	Heats		Repechage		Quarterfinals		Semifinals		Final	
Athlete	Event	Time	Rank	Time	Rank	Time	Rank	Time	Rank	Time	Rank
Dattu Baban Bhokanal	Men's single sculls	7:21.67	3 QF	Bye		6:59.89	4 SC/D	7:19.02	2 FC	6:54.96	13

Qualification Legend: FA=Final A (medal); FB=Final B (non-medal); FC=Final C (non-medal); FD=Final D (non-medal); FE=Final E (non-medal); FF=Final F (non-medal); SA/B=Semifinals A/B; SC/D=Semifinals C/D; SE/F=Semifinals E/F; QF=Quarterfinals; R=Repechage

== Shooting ==
Indian shooters have achieved quota places for the following events by virtue of their best finish at the 2014 and 2015 ISSF World Championships, the 2015 ISSF World Cup series and Asian Championships, as long as they obtained a minimum qualifying score (MQS) by 31 March 2016.

On 19 March 2016, National Rifle Association of India (NRAI) had announced the squad of eleven Indian shooters for the Games, featuring four-time Olympian and Beijing 2008 air rifle champion Abhinav Bindra, London 2012 bronze medalist Gagan Narang, and multiple-time Worlds medalist Jitu Rai. Aiming to appear at his fourth Olympics, Manavjit Singh Sandhu became the twelfth Indian to join the team, as the NRAI decided to exchange a spot in the 50 m rifle 3 positions (won by Sanjeev Rajput) with the men's trap.

Men

Athlete	Event	Qualification		Semifinal		Final	
Athlete	Event	Points	Rank	Points	Rank	Points	Rank
Abhinav Bindra	10 m air rifle	625.7	7 Q	—N/a		163.8	4
Kynan Chenai	Trap	114	19	Did not advance			
Mairaj Ahmad Khan	Skeet	121 (+3)	9	Did not advance			
Prakash Nanjappa	50 m pistol	547	25	—N/a		did not advance	
Gagan Narang	10 m air rifle	621.7	23	—N/a		did not advance	
Gagan Narang	50 m rifle prone	623.1	13	—N/a		did not advance	
Gagan Narang	50 m rifle 3 positions	1162	33	—N/a		Did not advance	
Jitu Rai	10 m air pistol	580	6 Q	—N/a		78.7	8
Jitu Rai	50 m pistol	554	12	—N/a		did not advance	
Chain Singh	50 m rifle prone	619.6	36	—N/a		did not advance	
Chain Singh	50 m rifle 3 positions	1169	23	—N/a		Did not advance	
Gurpreet Singh	10 m air pistol	576	20	—N/a		did not advance	
Gurpreet Singh	25 m rapid fire pistol	581	7	—N/a		did not advance	
Manavjit Singh Sandhu	Trap	115	16	Did not advance			

Women

Athlete	Event	Qualification		Semifinal		Final	
Athlete	Event	Points	Rank	Points	Rank	Points	Rank
Apurvi Chandela	10 m air rifle	411.6	34	—N/a		Did not advance	
Ayonika Paul	10 m air rifle	407.0	43	—N/a		Did not advance	
Heena Sidhu	10 m air pistol	380	14	—N/a		did not advance	
Heena Sidhu	25 m pistol	576	20	did not advance			

Qualification Legend: Q = Qualify for the next round; q = Qualify for the bronze medal (shotgun)

== Swimming ==
India has received a Universality invitation from FINA to send two swimmers (one male and one female) to the Olympics.

Athlete	Event	Heat		Semifinal		Final	
Athlete	Event	Time	Rank	Time	Rank	Time	Rank
Sajan Prakash	Men's 200 m butterfly	1:59.37	28	Did not advance			
Shivani Kataria	Women's 200 m freestyle	2:09.30	41	Did not advance			

== Table tennis ==
India has entered four athletes into the table tennis competition at the Games. 2012 Olympian Soumyajit Ghosh and Manika Batra secured the Olympic spot each in the men's and women's singles as the highest-ranked player coming from the South Asia zone, while Sharath Kamal and 2004 Olympian Mouma Das scored a second-stage draw victory each to take the remaining spots on the Indian team at the Asian Qualification Tournament in Hong Kong.

Athlete	Event	Round 1	Round 2	Round 3	Round of 16	Quarterfinals	Semifinals	Final / BM	
Athlete	Event	Opposition Result	Opposition Result	Opposition Result	Opposition Result	Opposition Result	Opposition Result	Opposition Result	Rank
Sharath Kamal	Men's singles	Crişan (ROU); L 1–4	Did not advance						
Soumyajit Ghosh	Men's singles	Tanviriyavechakul (THA); L 1–4	Did not advance						
Manika Batra	Women's singles	Grzybowska (POL); L 2–4	Did not advance						
Mouma Das	Women's singles	Dodean (ROU); L 0–4	Did not advance						

== Tennis ==
India has entered four tennis players into the Olympic tournament. Sania Mirza (world no. 1) and Rohan Bopanna (world no. 10) teamed up with their partners Prarthana Thombare and six-time Olympian Leander Paes, respectively, in the men's and women's doubles by virtue of their top-10 ATP and WTA Ranking as of 6 June 2016.

Athlete	Event	Round 32	Round 16	Quarterfinals	Semifinals	Final / BM	
Athlete	Event	Opposition Result	Opposition Result	Opposition Result	Opposition Result	Opposition Result	Rank
Rohan Bopanna; Leander Paes	Men's doubles	Kubot / Matkowski (POL); L 4–6, 6–7^{(6–8)}	Did not advance				
Sania Mirza; Prarthana Thombare	Women's doubles	Peng S / Zhang S (CHN); L 6–7^{(6–8)}, 7–5, 5–7	Did not advance				
Sania Mirza; Rohan Bopanna	Mixed doubles	—N/a	Stosur / Peers (AUS); W 7–5, 6–4	Watson / Murray (GBR); W 6–4, 6–4	V Williams / Ram (USA); L 6–2, 2–6, [3–10]	Hradecká / Štěpánek (CZE); L 1–6, 5–7	4

== Weightlifting ==
India has qualified one male and one female weightlifter for the Rio Olympics by virtue of a top seven national finish (for men) & top six (for women), respectively, at the 2016 Asian Championships.

Athlete	Event	Snatch		Clean & jerk		Total	Rank
Athlete	Event	Result	Rank	Result	Rank	Total	Rank
Sathish Sivalingam	Men's −77 kg	148	12	181	11	329	11
Mirabai Chanu	Women's −48 kg	82	6	~~106~~	DNF	82	DNF

== Wrestling ==
India has qualified eight wrestlers for each of the following weight category into the Olympic. One Olympic spot in the men's freestyle 74 kg was earned at the 2015 World Championships, while two more Olympic places were awarded to Indian wrestlers, who progressed to the top two finals at the 2016 Asian Qualification Tournament.

Three further wrestlers had claimed the remaining Olympic slots in separate World Qualification Tournaments; one of them in men's freestyle 57 kg at the initial meet in Ulaanbaatar, and two more each in women's freestyle 48 & 58 kg at the final meet in Istanbul.

On 11 May 2016, United World Wrestling awarded two additional Olympic licenses to India in men's Greco-Roman 85 kg and women's freestyle 53 kg, after doping violations were discovered among the seven qualified wrestlers

Freestyle wrestler Narsingh Pancham Yadav, who had qualified for the men's 74 kg event, failed both the A and B sample doping tests on 25 June and 5 July. He was provisionally replaced by Parveen Rana, but was later reinstated on 3 August when the National Anti-Doping Agency of India gave him a clean record on grounds that he had been a victim of sabotage. However the World Anti-Doping Agency appealed against this decision to drop the doping charges, following which Yadav was suspended for four years and disqualified from the Olympics by the Court of Arbitration on 18 August.

Key:

- VT – Victory by Fall.
- PP – Decision by Points – the loser with technical points.
- PO – Decision by Points – the loser without technical points.
- ST – Technical superiority – the loser without technical points and a margin of victory of at least 8 (Greco-Roman) or 10 (freestyle) points.
- VB – Victory by Injury

Men's freestyle

Athlete	Event	Qualification	Round of 16	Quarterfinal	Semifinal	Repechage 1	Repechage 2	Final / BM	
Athlete	Event	Opposition Result	Opposition Result	Opposition Result	Opposition Result	Opposition Result	Opposition Result	Opposition Result	Rank
Sandeep Tomar	−57 kg	Bye	Lebedev (RUS); L 1–3 ^{PP}	Did not advance					15
Yogeshwar Dutt	−65 kg	Ganzorig (MGL); L 0–3 ^{PO}	Did not advance						21

Men's Greco-Roman

Athlete	Event	Qualification	Round of 16	Quarterfinal	Semifinal	Repechage 1	Repechage 2	Final / BM	
Athlete	Event	Opposition Result	Opposition Result	Opposition Result	Opposition Result	Opposition Result	Opposition Result	Opposition Result	Rank
Ravinder Khatri	−85 kg	Bye	Lőrincz (HUN); L 0–4 ^{ST}	Did not advance					20
Hardeep Singh	−98 kg	Bye	İldem (TUR); L 1–3 ^{PP}	Did not advance					13

Women's freestyle

Athlete	Event	Qualification	Round of 16	Quarterfinal	Semifinal	Repechage 1	Repechage 2	Final / BM	
Athlete	Event	Opposition Result	Opposition Result	Opposition Result	Opposition Result	Opposition Result	Opposition Result	Opposition Result	Rank
Vinesh Phogat	−48 kg	Bye	Vuc (ROU); W 4–0 ^{ST}	Sun Yn (CHN); L 1–5 ^{VB}	Did not advance				10
Babita Kumari	−53 kg	Bye	Prevolaraki (GRE); L 1–3 ^{PP}	Did not advance					13
Sakshi Malik	−58 kg	J Mattsson (SWE); W 3–1 ^{PP}	Cherdivara (MDA); W 3–1 ^{PP}	Koblova (RUS); L 1–3 ^{PP}	Did not advance	Bye	Pürevdorj (MGL); W 3–1 ^{PP}	Tynybekova (KGZ); W 3–1^{PP}	3rd place, bronze medalist(s)

== See also ==
- India at the 2016 Summer Paralympics
- 2016 Summer Olympics medal table
- India at the Olympics
