= Weightlifting at the 2016 Summer Olympics – Women's 48 kg =

Women's 48 kg at the Games of the XXXI Olympiad
- Venue: Riocentro
- Date: 6 August 2016
- Competitors: 12 from 12 nations
- Winning total: 200 kg

Medalists
| 1st place, gold medalist(s) | | Sopita Tanasan | Thailand |
| 2nd place, silver medalist(s) | | Sri Wahyuni Agustiani | Indonesia |
| 3rd place, bronze medalist(s) | | Hiromi Miyake | Japan |

The Women's 48 kg weightlifting competitions at the 2016 Summer Olympics in Rio de Janeiro took place on 6 August at the Pavilion 2 of Riocentro.

The medals were presented by Tricia Smith, IOC member, Canada and Tamás Aján, President of International Weightlifting Federation.

== Schedule ==
All times are Time in Brazil (UTC-03:00)

| Date | Time | Event |
|---|---|---|
| 6 August 2016 | 19:00 | Group A |

== Records ==
Prior to this competition, the existing world and Olympic records were as follows.

| World record | Snatch | Yang Lian (CHN) | 98 kg | Santo Domingo, Dominican | 1 October 2006 |
| World record | Clean & Jerk | Chen Xiexia (CHN) | 120 kg | Tai'an, China | 21 April 2007 |
| World record | Total | Yang Lian (CHN) | 217 kg | Santo Domingo, Dominican | 1 October 2006 |
| Olympic record | Snatch | Nurcan Taylan (TUR) | 97 kg | Athens, Greece | 14 August 2004 |
| Olympic record | Clean & Jerk | Aree Wiratthaworn (THA) | 115 kg | Athens, Greece | 14 August 2004 |
| Olympic record | Total | Nurcan Taylan (TUR) | 210 kg | Athens, Greece | 14 August 2004 |

- Chen Xiexia's Olympic records in 2008 were rescinded in 2017.
- Nurcan Taylan's world record in 2010 was rescinded in 2021.

== Results ==
| Rank | Athlete | Nation | Group | Body weight | Snatch (kg) | | | | Clean & Jerk (kg) | | | | Total |
| Rank | Athlete | Nation | Group | Body weight | 1 | 2 | 3 | Result | 1 | 2 | 3 | Result | Total |
|---|---|---|---|---|---|---|---|---|---|---|---|---|---|
| 1st place, gold medalist(s) | Sopita Tanasan | Thailand | A | 47.91 | 88 | 90 | 92 | 92 | 106 | 108 | ~~110~~ | 108 | 200 |
| 2nd place, silver medalist(s) | Sri Wahyuni Agustiani | Indonesia | A | 47.25 | 82 | 85 | ~~87~~ | 85 | 107 | ~~115~~ | ~~115~~ | 107 | 192 |
| 3rd place, bronze medalist(s) | Hiromi Miyake | Japan | A | 47.95 | ~~81~~ | ~~81~~ | 81 | 81 | 105 | ~~107~~ | 107 | 107 | 188 |
| 4 | Beatriz Pirón | Dominican Republic | A | 47.50 | 85 | ~~87~~ | ~~87~~ | 85 | 102 | ~~105~~ | ~~105~~ | 102 | 187 |
| 5 | Margarita Yelisseyeva | Kazakhstan | A | 47.72 | 80 | ~~84~~ | ~~84~~ | 80 | 103 | ~~106~~ | 106 | 106 | 186 |
| 6 | Morghan King | United States | A | 47.79 | 80 | ~~82~~ | 83 | 83 | 100 | ~~103~~ | ~~103~~ | 100 | 183 |
| 7 | Chen Wei-ling | Chinese Taipei | A | 47.13 | 75 | 79 | 81 | 81 | ~~99~~ | ~~100~~ | 100 | 100 | 181 |
| 8 | Iulia Paratova | Ukraine | A | 47.74 | 84 | ~~86~~ | ~~86~~ | 84 | ~~95~~ | 95 | ~~98~~ | 95 | 179 |
| 9 | Roilya Ranaivosoa | Mauritius | A | 47.90 | 73 | ~~78~~ | 80 | 80 | 93 | ~~98~~ | ~~100~~ | 93 | 173 |
| 10 | Zhanyl Okoeva | Kyrgyzstan | A | 47.56 | 68 | 72 | ~~75~~ | 72 | 92 | 97 | ~~101~~ | 97 | 169 |
| – | Mirabai Chanu | India | A | 47.77 | ~~82~~ | 82 | ~~84~~ | 82 | ~~104~~ | ~~106~~ | ~~106~~ | – | – |
| – | Vương Thị Huyền | Vietnam | A | 47.84 | ~~83~~ | ~~84~~ | ~~84~~ | – | – | – | – | – | – |
