= Scarleth Mercado =

Nicaraguan weightlifter

Scarleth Elizabeth Mercado Lopez
Personal information
- Born: 9 August 1996 (age 29)
- Height: 1.52 m (5 ft 0 in)
- Weight: 52.99 kg (116.8 lb)

Sport
- Country: Nicaragua
- Sport: Weightlifting
- Team: National team
- Updated on 21 July 2016

Scarleth Elizabeth Mercado Lopez (born 9 August 1996) is a Nicaraguan female weightlifter, competing in the 53 kg category and representing Nicaragua at international competitions.

She competed at world championships, including at the 2015 World Weightlifting Championships, and 2016 Summer Olympics.

== Major results ==
Year	Venue	Weight	Snatch (kg)				Clean & Jerk (kg)				Total	Rank
Year	Venue	Weight	1	2	3	Rank	1	2	3	Rank	Total	Rank
World Championships
2015	Houston, United States	53 kg	65	~~70~~	~~70~~	37	85	90	~~93~~	32	155	34
