= Sri Wahyuni Agustiani =

Indonesian weightlifter (born 1994)

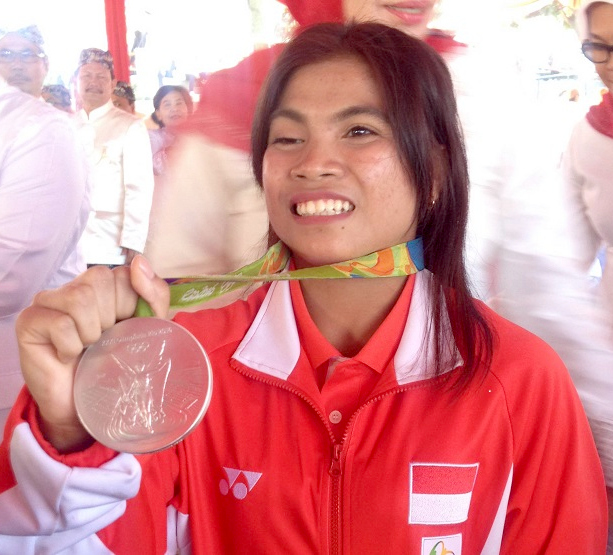
- Sri Wahyuni Agustiani in 2016

Personal information
- Born: 13 August 1994 (age 32) Bandung, West Java, Indonesia
- Education: Bhayangkara Jakarta Raya University
- Height: 1.55 m (5 ft 1 in)
- Spouse: M. Ichsan Apriawan (m. 2018)

Sport
- Sport: Weightlifting
- Club: Bekasi Regency
Medal record
Women's weightlifting
Representing Indonesia
Olympic Games
Silver medal – second place	2016 Rio de Janeiro	48 kg
Asian Games
Silver medal – second place	2014 Incheon	48 kg
Silver medal – second place	2018 Jakarta–Palembang	48 kg
Asian Championships
Silver medal – second place	2013 Astana	48 kg
Summer Universiade
Bronze medal – third place	2017 Taipei	48 kg
Islamic Solidarity Games
Gold medal – first place	2013 Palembang	48 kg
Gold medal – first place	2017 Baku	48 kg
SEA Games
Gold medal – first place	2013 Naypyidaw	48 kg
Junior World Championships
Gold medal – first place	2014 Kazan	48 kg
Asian Youth Championships
Silver medal – second place	2010 Tashkent	44 kg

Sri Wahyuni Agustiani (born 13 August 1994) is an Indonesian weightlifter. Competing in the 48 kg body weight category she won silver medals at the 2013 Asian Championships, 2014 and 2018 Asian Games, and 2016 Summer Olympics.

== Biography and Early Career ==
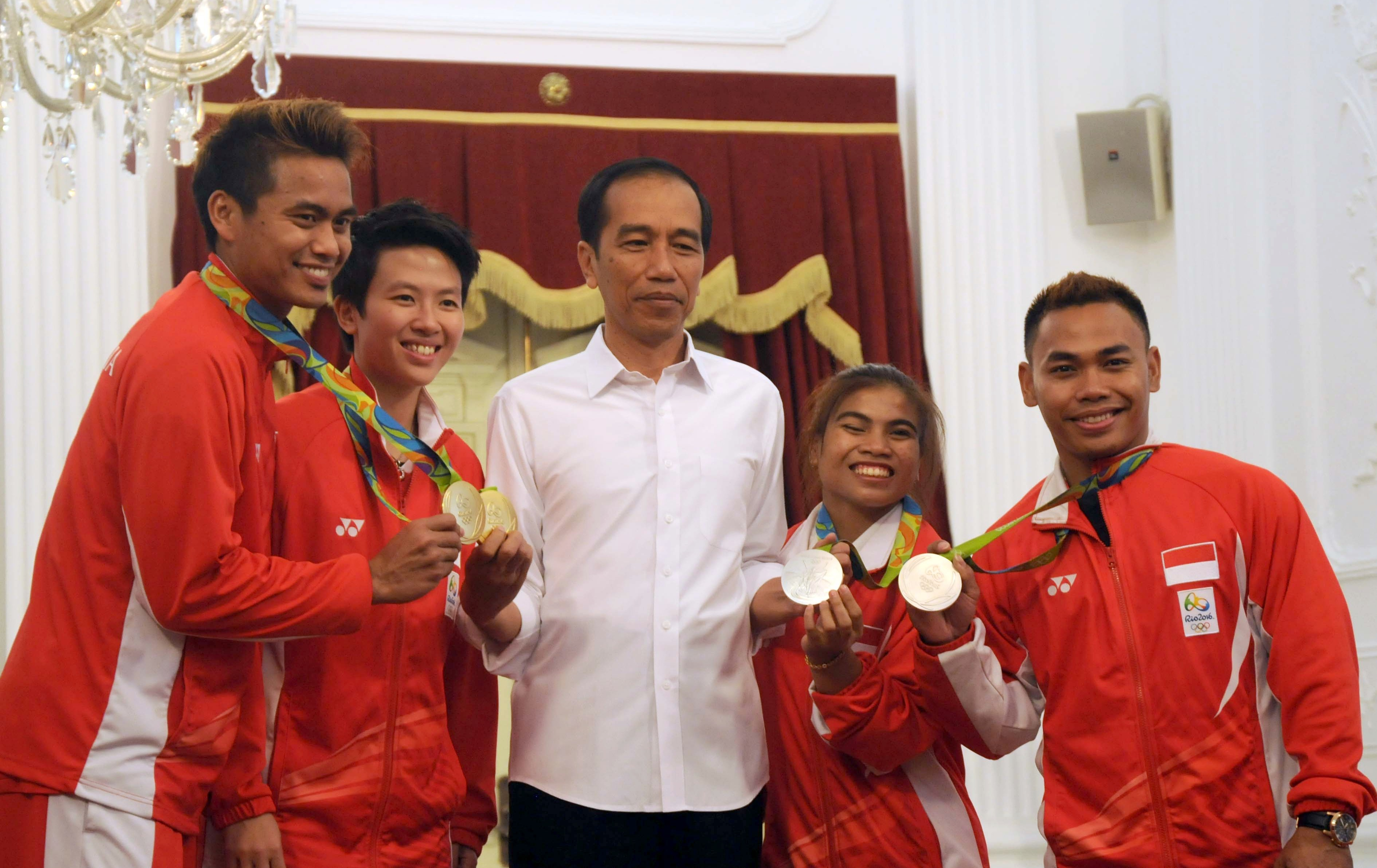
2016 Summer Olympics medalists at the State Palace in Jakarta. Left-right: Ahmad, Natsir, Widodo, Agustiani and Irawan.

Sri Wahyuni Agustiani is a Sundanese woman, born on 13 August 1994 at Bandung, West Java, Indonesia. Since age 10, she has been passionate about weightlifting, with her dad as her first teacher, and source of inspiration.

She started her foray at weightlifting national competition, where she has shown her talent since junior competitions. She first joined the women's lifting international competition at age 15. She won two golds and one silver at the IWF Junior World Weightlifting Championships in Kazan, Russia in June 2014, organised by the International Weightlifting Federation (IWF).

== 2013 SEA Games, 2014 Asian Games-2016 Summer Olympics ==
Before the Olympics, Bandung-born Sri Wahyuni Agustiani had already shown huge potentials after winning silver in the 2014 Asian Games held in Incheon-South Korea and gold in the 2013 SEA Games.

Sri Wahyuni bring Team Indonesia sealed their first medal at the Rio 2016 Summer Olympics, she won silver medal in the women's 48 kilogram category on Sunday 7 August 2016. Sri lifted 192 kilograms in total to win the silver medal.

== 2018 Asian Games ==
In 2018, Indonesian female weightlifter Sri Wahyuni, who competed in the women's 48 kilogram category in the 2018 Asian Games, won also silver medal. This actually the second silver medal, after the last time she get in 2014 Asian Games, Incheon.
