= Margarita Yelisseyeva =

Kazakhstani weightlifter

Personal information
- Born: July 20, 1992 (age 34)
- Height: 1.5 m (4 ft 11 in)
- Weight: 48 kg (106 lb)

Sport
- Country: Kazakhstan
- Sport: Weightlifting
- Event: Women's 48 kg

Margarita Yelisseyeva (born 20 July 1992) is a Kazakh weightlifter. She earned a gold medal at the 2014 Asian Games in the women's 48 kg class in Incheon. She attends Kazakh Academy of Sport and Tourism.
