= List of divers at the 2016 Summer Olympics =

This is a list of the divers who will be participating for their country at the 2016 Summer Olympics in Rio de Janeiro, Brazil from August 5–21, 2016. 136 divers are set to participate at the Games across four events.

== Male divers ==
NOC	Name	Age	Hometown	Events
Australia	Domonic Bedggood	September 18, 1994 (aged 21)	(Australia) (Queensland) Gold Coast	10m Platform
Australia	Kevin Chávez	July 9, 1991 (aged 25)	(Australia) (New South Wales) Sydney	3m Springboard
Australia	James Connor	May 5, 1995 (aged 21)	(Australia) (Victoria (state)) Clayton	10m Platform
Australia	Grant Nel	April 7, 1988 (aged 28)	(Australia) (South Australia) Adelaide	3m Springboard
Austria	Constantin Blaha	December 11, 1987 (aged 28)	(Austria) Vienna	3m Springboard
Belarus	Vadim Kaptur	January 12, 1987 (aged 29)	(Belarus) Minsk	10m Platform
Belarus	Yauheni Karaliou	March 26, 1991 (aged 25)	(Belarus) Minsk	10m Platform
Brazil	César Castro	September 2, 1982 (aged 33)	(Brazil) (Federal District (Brazil)) Brasília	3m Springboard
Brazil	Ian Matos	April 24, 1989 (aged 27)	(Brazil)	3m Springboard Synchronised
Brazil	Luiz Outerelo	December 11, 1991 (aged 24)	(Brazil)	3m Springboard Synchronised
Brazil	Hugo Parisi	August 1, 1984 (aged 32)	(Brazil) (Federal District (Brazil)) Taguatinga	10m Platform; 10m Platform Synchronised
Brazil	Jackson Rondinelli	May 20, 1994 (aged 22)	(Brazil)	10m Platform Synchronised
Canada	Maxim Bouchard	September 18, 1990 (aged 25)	(Canada) (Quebec) Montreal	10m Platform
Canada	Philippe Gagné	October 23, 1997 (aged 18)	(Canada) (Quebec) Montreal	3m Springboard
Canada	Vincent Riendeau	December 3, 1996 (aged 19)	(Canada) (Quebec) Montreal	10m Platform
China	Cao Yuan	February 7, 1995 (aged 21)	(China) Beijing	3m Springboard; 3m Springboard Synchronised
China	Chen Aisen	October 22, 1995 (aged 20)	(China) Guangzhou	10m Platform; 10m Platform Synchronised
China	He Chao	February 11, 1992 (aged 24)	(China) Zhanjiang	3m Springboard
China	Lin Yue	January 24, 1991 (aged 25)	(China) Guangdong	10m Platform Synchronised
China	Qin Kai	January 31, 1986 (aged 30)	(China) Xi'an	3m Springboard Synchronised
China	Qiu Bo	January 31, 1993 (aged 23)	(China) Chengdu	10m Platform
Colombia	Sebastián Morales	August 22, 1994 (aged 21)	(Colombia) Medellín	3m Springboard
Colombia	Victor Ortega	January 27, 1988 (aged 28)	(Colombia) Medellín	10m Platform
Colombia	Sebastián Villa	February 21, 1992 (aged 24)	(Colombia)	10m Platform
Egypt	Mohab El-Kordy	March 21, 1997 (aged 19)	(Egypt)	3m Springboard
Egypt	Youssef Selim	December 14, 1997 (aged 18)	(Egypt)	10m Platform
France	Benjamin Auffret	March 15, 1995 (aged 21)	(France)	10m Platform
France	Matthieu Rosset	May 26, 1990 (aged 26)	(France) Lyon	3m Springboard
Germany	Stephan Feck	February 17, 1990 (aged 26)	(Germany) Leipzig	3m Springboard; 3m Springboard Synchronised
Germany	Patrick Hausding	March 9, 1989 (aged 27)	(Germany) Berlin	3m Springboard; 3m Springboard Synchronised; 10m Platform Synchronised
Germany	Sascha Klein	September 12, 1985 (aged 30)	(Germany) Eschweiler	10m Platform; 10m Platform Synchronised
Germany	Martin Wolfram	January 29, 1992 (aged 24)	(Germany) Dresden	10m Platform
Great Britain	Tom Daley	May 21, 1994 (aged 22)	(United Kingdom) Plymouth	10m Platform; 10m Platform Synchronised
Great Britain	Daniel Goodfellow	October 19, 1996 (aged 19)	(United Kingdom) Cambridge	10m Platform Synchronised
Great Britain	Jack Laugher	January 30, 1995 (aged 21)	(United Kingdom) Harrogate	3m Springboard; 3m Springboard Synchronised
Great Britain	Chris Mears	February 7, 1993 (aged 23)	(United Kingdom) Reading	3m Springboard Synchronised
Great Britain	Freddie Woodward	June 23, 1995 (aged 21)	(United Kingdom) Sheffield	3m Springboard
Ireland	Oliver Dingley	November 24, 1992 (aged 23)	(United Kingdom) Harrogate	3m Springboard
Italy	Michele Benedetti	December 17, 1984 (aged 31)	(Italy) Parma	3m Springboard; 3m Springboard Synchronised
Italy	Andrea Chiarabini	May 12, 1995 (aged 21)	(Italy) Rome	3m Springboard
Italy	Giovanni Tocci	August 31, 1994 (aged 21)	(Italy) Cosenza	3m Springboard Synchronised
Italy	Maicol Verzotto	May 24, 1988 (aged 28)	(Italy) Bressanone	10m Platform
Jamaica	Yona Knight-Wisdom	May 12, 1995 (aged 21)	(United Kingdom) Leeds	3m Springboard
Japan	Sho Sakai	August 22, 1992 (aged 23)	(Japan)	3m Springboard
Japan	Ken Terauchi	August 7, 1980 (aged 35)	(Japan) Takarazuka	3m Springboard
Malaysia	Ahmad Amsyar Azman	August 28, 1992 (aged 23)	(Malaysia) Kuala Lumpur	3m Springboard
Malaysia	Ooi Tze Liang	November 19, 1993 (aged 22)	(Malaysia) Penang	10m Platform
Mexico	Iván García	October 25, 1993 (aged 22)	(Mexico) (Jalisco) Guadalajara	10m Platform; 10m Platform Synchronised
Mexico	Rodrigo Diego López	December 2, 1996 (aged 19)	(Mexico)	3m Springboard
Mexico	Jahir Ocampo	January 12, 1990 (aged 26)	(State of Mexico) Mexico City	3m Springboard Synchronised
Mexico	Rommel Pacheco	January 12, 1986 (aged 30)	(Mexico) (Yucatán) Mérida	3m Springboard; 3m Springboard Synchronised
Mexico	Germán Sánchez	June 24, 1992 (aged 24)	(Mexico) (Jalisco) Guadalajara	10m Platform; 10m Platform Synchronised
Puerto Rico	Rafael Quintero	July 24, 1994 (aged 22)	(Puerto Rico)	10m Platform
Russia	Evgeny Kuznetsov	April 12, 1990 (aged 26)	(Russia) (Stavropol Krai) Stavropol	3m Springboard; 3m Springboard Synchronised
Russia	Viktor Minibaev	July 18, 1991 (aged 25)	(Russia) (Moscow Oblast) Elektrostal	10m Platform; 10m Platform Synchronised
Russia	Nikita Shleikher	June 10, 1998 (aged 18)	(Russia) (Stavropol Krai) Stavropol	10m Platform; 10m Platform Synchronised
Russia	Ilya Zakharov	May 2, 1991 (aged 25)	(Russia) (Saratov Oblast) Saratov	3m Springboard; 3m Springboard Synchronised
South Korea	Woo Ha-ram	March 21, 1988 (aged 28)	(South Korea) Busan	3m Springboard; 10m Platform
Ukraine	Maksym Dolhov	June 16, 1996 (aged 20)	(Ukraine) Zaporizhia	10m Platform Synchronised
Ukraine	Oleksandr Horshkovozov	July 18, 1991 (aged 25)	(Ukraine) Luhansk	10m Platform Synchronised
Ukraine	Illya Kvasha	March 5, 1988 (aged 28)	(Ukraine) Mykolaiv	3m Springboard
United States	David Boudia	April 24, 1989 (aged 27)	(United States) (Texas) Abilene	10m Platform; 10m Platform Synchronised
United States	Sam Dorman	August 30, 1991 (aged 24)	(United States) (Arizona) Tempe	3m Springboard Synchronised
United States	Michael Hixon	July 16, 1994 (aged 22)	(United States) (Massachusetts) Amherst	3m Springboard; 3m Springboard Synchronised
United States	Kristian Ipsen	October 20, 1992 (aged 23)	(United States) (California) Clayton	3m Springboard
United States	Steele Johnson	June 16, 1996 (aged 20)	(United States) (Indiana) Indianapolis	10m Platform; 10m Platform Synchronised
Venezuela	Jesús Liranzo	November 2, 1995 (aged 20)	(Venezuela)	10m Platform
Venezuela	Robert Páez	June 1, 1994 (aged 22)	(Venezuela) Cumaná	10m Platform

== Female divers ==
NOC	Name	Age	Hometown	Events
Australia	Brittany Broben	November 25, 1995 (aged 20)	(Australia) (Queensland) Gold Coast	10m Platform
Australia	Maddison Keeney	May 23, 1996 (aged 20)	(Australia) (Queensland) Brisbane	3m Springboard; 3m Springboard Synchronised
Australia	Esther Qin	November 18, 1991 (aged 24)	(Australia) (Victoria (state)) Melbourne	3m Springboard
Australia	Anabelle Smith	February 3, 1993 (aged 23)	(Australia) (Queensland) Brisbane	3m Springboard Synchronised
Australia	Melissa Wu	May 3, 1992 (aged 24)	(Australia) (New South Wales) Sydney	10m Platform
Brazil	Tammy Takagi	March 11, 1991 (aged 25)	(Brazil)	3m Springboard Synchronised
Brazil	Ingrid Oliveira	May 7, 1996 (aged 20)	(Brazil)	10m Platform; 10m Platform Synchronised
Brazil	Giovanna Pedroso	October 15, 1998 (aged 17)	(Brazil)	10m Platform Synchronised
Brazil	Juliana Veloso	December 22, 1980 (aged 35)	(Brazil) (Rio de Janeiro (state)) Rio de Janeiro	3m Springboard; 3m Springboard Synchronised
Canada	Jennifer Abel	August 23, 1991 (aged 24)	(Canada) (Quebec) Laval	3m Springboard; 3m Springboard Synchronised
Canada	Meaghan Benfeito	March 2, 1989 (aged 27)	(Canada) (Quebec) Montreal	10m Platform; 10m Platform Synchronised
Canada	Roseline Filion	July 3, 1987 (aged 29)	(Canada) (Quebec) Laval	10m Platform; 10m Platform Synchronised
Canada	Pamela Ware	February 12, 1993 (aged 23)	(Canada) (Quebec) Montreal	3m Springboard; 3m Springboard Synchronised
China	Chen Ruolin	December 12, 1992 (aged 23)	(China) Nantong	10m Platform Synchronised
China	He Zi	December 11, 1990 (aged 25)	(China) Tianjin	3m Springboard
China	Liu Huixia	November 30, 1997 (aged 18)	(China) Wuhan	10m Platform Synchronised
China	Ren Qian	February 20, 2001 (aged 15)	(China) Chengdu	10m Platform
China	Shi Tingmao	August 31, 1991 (aged 24)	(China) Chongqing	3m Springboard; 3m Springboard Synchronised
China	Si Yajie	December 4, 1998 (aged 17)	(China) Xi'an	10m Platform
China	Wu Minxia	November 10, 1985 (aged 30)	(China) Shanghai	3m Springboard Synchronised
Colombia	Diana Pineda	September 6, 1984 (aged 31)	(Colombia)	3m Springboard
Croatia	Marcela Marić	October 16, 1996 (aged 19)	(Croatia)	3m Springboard
Egypt	Maha Amer	March 27, 1999 (aged 17)	(Egypt)	3m Springboard
Egypt	Maha Gouda	June 8, 1998 (aged 18)	(Egypt)	10m Platform
France	Laura Marino	July 2, 1993 (aged 23)	(France)	10m Platform
Germany	Maria Kurjo	December 10, 1989 (aged 26)	(Germany) Berlin	10m Platform
Germany	Tina Punzel	August 1, 1995 (aged 21)	(Germany) Dresden	3m Springboard; 3m Springboard Synchronised
Germany	Nora Subschinski	June 5, 1988 (aged 28)	(Germany) Berlin	3m Springboard; 3m Springboard Synchronised
Germany	Elena Wassen	November 1, 2000 (aged 15)	(Germany)	10m Platform
Great Britain	Sarah Barrow	October 22, 1988 (aged 27)	(United Kingdom) Plymouth	10m Platform
Great Britain	Alicia Blagg	October 21, 1996 (aged 19)	(United Kingdom) Wakefield	3m Springboard Synchronised
Great Britain	Tonia Couch	May 20, 1989 (aged 27)	(United Kingdom) Plymouth	10m Platform; 10m Platform Synchronised
Great Britain	Rebecca Gallantree	August 19, 1984 (aged 31)	(United Kingdom) Chelmsford	3m Springboard; 3m Springboard Synchronised
Great Britain	Grace Reid	May 9, 1996 (aged 20)	(United Kingdom) Edinburgh	3m Springboard
Great Britain	Lois Toulson	September 26, 1999 (aged 16)	(United Kingdom) Leeds	10m Platform Synchronised
Hungary	Villő Kormos	August 2, 1988 (aged 28)	(Hungary) Budapest	10m Platform
Italy	Noemi Batki	October 12, 1987 (aged 28)	(Italy) Trieste	10m Platform
Italy	Tania Cagnotto	May 15, 1985 (aged 31)	(Italy) Bolzano	3m Springboard; 3m Springboard Synchronised
Italy	Francesca Dallapé	June 24, 1986 (aged 30)	(Italy) Trento	3m Springboard Synchronised
Italy	Maria Marconi	August 28, 1984 (aged 31)	(Italy) Rome	3m Springboard
Japan	Minami Itahashi	January 28, 2000 (aged 16)	(Japan)	10m Platform
Malaysia	Cheong Jun Hoong	April 16, 1990 (aged 26)	(Malaysia) Ipoh	3m Springboard; 3m Springboard Synchronised; 10m Platform Synchronised
Malaysia	Ng Yan Yee	July 11, 1993 (aged 23)	(Malaysia) Kuala Lumpur	3m Springboard
Malaysia	Pandelela Rinong	March 2, 1993 (aged 23)	(Malaysia) Bau	10m Platform; 10m Platform Synchronised
Malaysia	Nur Dhabitah Sabri	July 12, 1999 (aged 17)	(Malaysia) Kuala Lumpur	10m Platform; 3m Springboard Synchronised
Mexico	Paola Espinosa	July 31, 1985 (aged 31)	(Mexico) (Baja California Sur) La Paz	10m Platform; 10m Platform Synchronised
Mexico	Dolores Hernández	May 21, 1997 (aged 19)	(Mexico) Veracruz	3m Springboard
Mexico	Melany Hernández	July 26, 1998 (aged 18)	(Mexico)	3m Springboard
Mexico	Alejandra Orozco	April 19, 1997 (aged 19)	(Mexico) (Jalisco) Guadalajara	10m Platform; 10m Platform Synchronised
Netherlands	Uschi Freitag	August 19, 1989 (aged 26)	(Netherlands) Maastricht	3m Springboard
New Zealand	Elizabeth Cui	August 12, 1997 (aged 18)	(New Zealand)	3m Springboard
North Korea	Kim Kuk-hyang	April 4, 1999 (aged 17)	(North Korea) Pyongyang	10m Platform; 10m Platform Synchronised
North Korea	Kim Mi-rae	April 7, 2001 (aged 15)	(North Korea)	10m Platform Synchronised
North Korea	Kim Un-hyang	October 21, 1991 (aged 24)	(North Korea)	10m Platform
Russia	Nadezhda Bazhina	December 29, 1987 (aged 28)	(Russia)	3m Springboard
Russia	Kristina Ilinykh	November 27, 1994 (aged 21)	(Russia)	3m Springboard
Russia	Ekaterina Petukhova	June 16, 1996 (aged 20)	(Russia)	10m Platform
Russia	Yulia Timoshinina	January 23, 1998 (aged 18)	(Russia)	10m Platform
South Africa	Julia Vincent	August 13, 1994 (aged 21)	(South Africa)	3m Springboard
Ukraine	Olena Fedorova	November 14, 1986 (aged 29)	(Ukraine) Mykolaiv	3m Springboard
Ukraine	Hanna Krasnoshlyk	March 6, 1996 (aged 20)	(Ukraine)	10m Platform
Ukraine	Anastasiia Nedobiga	April 20, 1994 (aged 22)	(Ukraine)	3m Springboard
Ukraine	Yulia Prokopchuk	October 23, 1986 (aged 29)	(Ukraine) Ukrainka	10m Platform
United States	Kassidy Cook	May 9, 1995 (aged 21)	(United States) (Florida) Plantation	3m Springboard
United States	Amy Cozad	May 6, 1991 (aged 25)	(United States) (Indiana) Indianapolis	10m Platform Synchronised
United States	Abby Johnston	November 16, 1989 (aged 26)	(United States) (Ohio) Upper Arlington	3m Springboard
United States	Jessica Parratto	June 26, 1994 (aged 22)	(United States) (New Hampshire) Dover	10m Platform
United States	Katrina Young	January 10, 1992 (aged 24)	(United States) (Washington (state)) Shoreline	10m Platform
