= Badminton at the 2016 Summer Olympics =

Badminton at the Games of the XXXI Olympiad
- Venue: Riocentro Pavilion 4
- Dates: 11–20 August 2016
- No. of events: 5 (2 men, 2 women, 1 mixed)
- Competitors: 172 from 46 nations

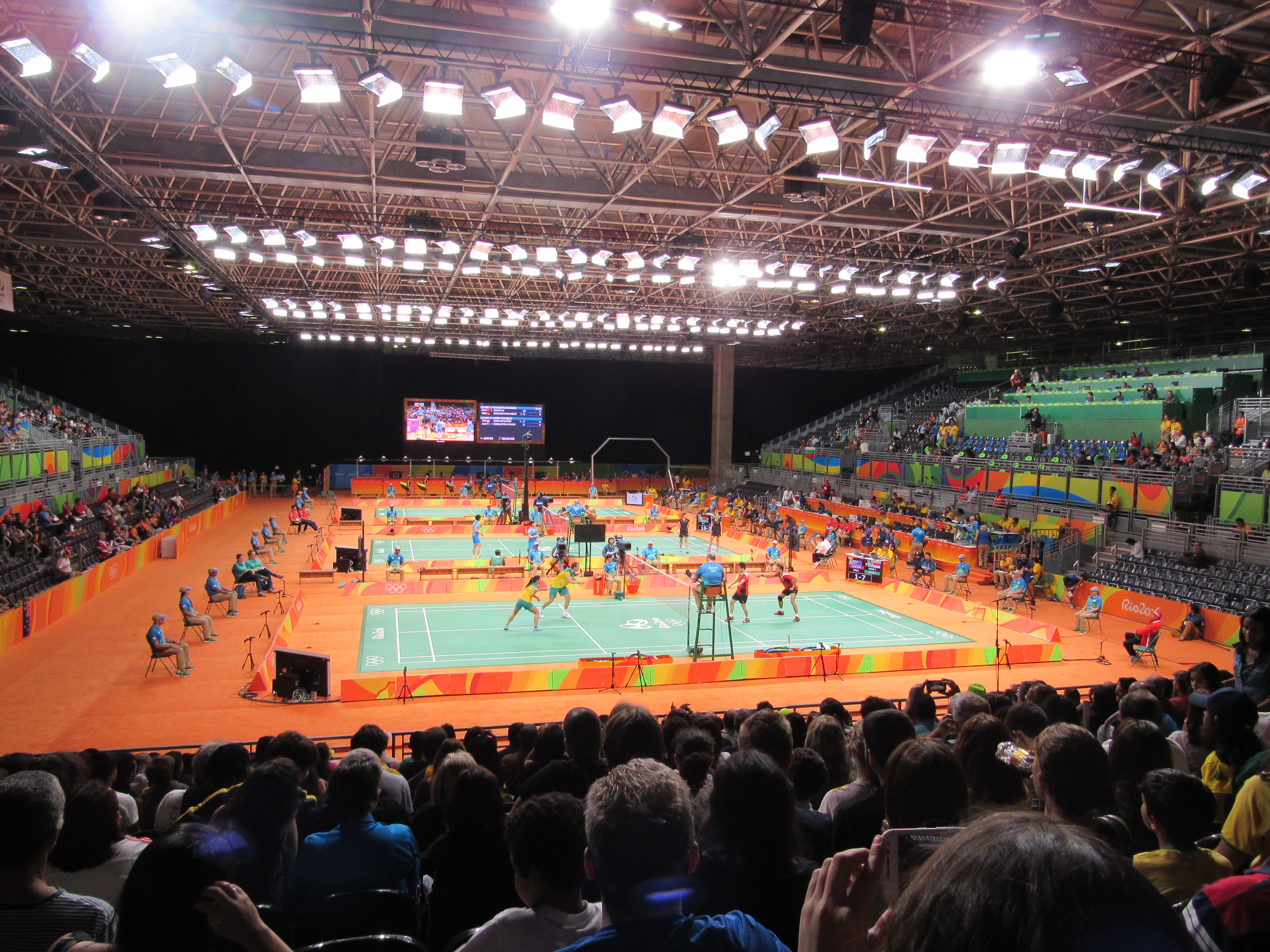
Riocentro Pavilion 4 was the venue of badminton competition

The badminton tournaments at the 2016 Summer Olympics in Rio de Janeiro took place from 11 to 20 August at the fourth pavilion of Riocentro. A total of 172 athletes competed in five events: men's singles, men's doubles, women's singles, women's doubles, and mixed doubles.

Similar to 2012 format, a combination of group play and knockout stages had been maintained at these Games. In all the doubles tournaments, the Badminton World Federation instituted several changes to the competition rules after the match fixing scandal from the previous Olympics, as all pairs finishing second in their groups would be placed into another draw to determine who they face in the next round, while the top pair in each group must have a fixed position matched to its designated seed in the knockout phase.

Hawk-Eye technology was first implemented in the sport of badminton in 2014 and made its Olympic debut during the Games. This system allows players to challenge line calls and request a video review, significantly enhancing the accuracy of officiating in the sport.

The Games made use of about 8,400 shuttlecocks.

== Qualification ==
The Olympic qualification period took place between 4 May 2015 and 1 May 2016, and the Badminton World Federation rankings list, scheduled to publish on 5 May 2016, was used to allocate spots. Unlike the previous Games, nations could only enter a maximum of two players each in the men's and women's singles, if both were ranked in the world's top 16; otherwise, one quota place until the roster of thirty-eight players had been completed. Similar regulations in the singles tournaments also applied to the players competing in the doubles, as the NOCs could only enter a maximum of two pairs if both were ranked in the top eight, while the remaining NOCs were entitled to one until the quota of 16 highest-ranked pairs was filled.

For each player who had qualified in more than one discipline, an additional quota place in each of the singles tournaments would have become free. If no player from one continent had qualify, the best ranked player from a respective continent would have got a quota place.

== Schedule ==
P	Preliminaries	R	Round of 16	¼	Quarterfinals	½	Semifinals	F	Final

Date →	Thu 11			Fri 12			Sat 13			Sun 14			Mon 15		Tues 16		Wed 17		Thu 18		Fri 19		Sat 20	
Event ↓	M	A	E	M	A	E	M	A	E	M	A	E	M	E	M	E	M	E	M	E	M	E	M	E
Men's singles	P												R				¼				½		F	
Men's doubles	P												¼		½				F		F			
Women's singles	P													R		¼			½		F			
Women's doubles	P												¼		½				F					
Mixed doubles	P											¼		½		F								

M = Morning session, A = Afternoon session, E = Evening session

== Participation ==
=== Participating nations ===
- Australia (5)
- Austria (2)
- Belgium (2)
- Brazil (2)
- Brunei (1)
- Bulgaria (3)
- Canada (2)
- China (15)
- Cuba (1)
- Czech Republic (2)
- Denmark (8)
- Estonia (2)
- Finland (1)
- France (2)
- Germany (7)
- Great Britain (8)
- Guatemala (1)
- Hong Kong (7)
- Hungary (1)
- India (7)
- Indonesia (10)
- Ireland (2)
- Israel (1)
- Italy (1)
- Japan (9)
- Malaysia (8)
- Mauritius (1)
- Mexico (1)
- Netherlands (3)
- Poland (5)
- Portugal (2)
- Russia (4)
- Singapore (2)
- South Africa (1)
- South Korea (14)
- Spain (2)
- Sri Lanka (1)
- Suriname (1)
- Sweden (1)
- Switzerland (1)
- Chinese Taipei (4)
- Thailand (7)
- Turkey (1)
- Ukraine (2)
- United States (7)
- Vietnam (2)

== Medal summary ==
=== Medal table ===
Rank	Nation	Gold	Silver	Bronze	Total
1	China	2	0	1	3
2	Japan	1	0	1	2
3	Indonesia	1	0	0	1
3	Spain	1	0	0	1
5	Malaysia	0	3	0	3
6	Denmark	0	1	1	2
7	India	0	1	0	1
8	Great Britain	0	0	1	1
8	South Korea	0	0	1	1
Totals (9 entries)		5	5	5	15

=== Medalists ===
Event	Gold	Silver	Bronze
Men's singles	Chen Long; China	Lee Chong Wei; Malaysia	Viktor Axelsen; Denmark
Men's doubles	China; Fu Haifeng; Zhang Nan	Malaysia; Goh V Shem; Tan Wee Kiong	Great Britain; Chris Langridge; Marcus Ellis
Women's singles	Carolina Marín; Spain	P. V. Sindhu; India	Nozomi Okuhara; Japan
Women's doubles	Japan; Misaki Matsutomo; Ayaka Takahashi	Denmark; Christinna Pedersen; Kamilla Rytter Juhl	South Korea; Jung Kyung-eun; Shin Seung-chan
Mixed doubles	Indonesia; Tontowi Ahmad; Liliyana Natsir	Malaysia; Chan Peng Soon; Goh Liu Ying	China; Zhang Nan; Zhao Yunlei

== Results ==
=== Men's singles ===
Quarterfinals
A1	Lee Chong Wei (MAS)	21	21
C1	Chou Tien-chen (TPE)	9	15
E1	Lin Dan (CHN)	21	11	21
H1	Srikanth Kidambi (IND)	6	21	18
I1	Rajiv Ouseph (GBR)	12	16
L1	Viktor Axelsen (DEN)	21	21
N1	Son Wan-ho (KOR)	11	21	11
P1	Chen Long (CHN)	21	18	21

Semifinals
A1	Lee Chong Wei (MAS)	15	21	22
E1	Lin Dan (CHN)	21	11	20
L1	Viktor Axelsen (DEN)	14	15
P1	Chen Long (CHN)	21	21

Finals
A1	Lee Chong Wei (MAS)	18	18
P1	Chen Long (CHN)	21	21
Third place
E1	Lin Dan (CHN)	21	10	17
L1	Viktor Axelsen (DEN)	15	21	21

=== Women's singles ===
Quarterfinals
A1	Carolina Marín (ESP)	21	21
C1	Sung Ji-hyun (KOR)	12	16
E1	Li Xuerui (CHN)	21	21
H1	Porntip Buranaprasertsuk (THA)	12	17
J1	Nozomi Okuhara (JPN)	11	21	21
K1	Akane Yamaguchi (JPN)	21	17	10
M1	P. V. Sindhu (IND)	22	21
P1	Wang Yihan (CHN)	20	19

Semifinals
A1	Carolina Marín (ESP)	21	21
E1	Li Xuerui (CHN)	14	16
J1	Nozomi Okuhara (JPN)	19	10
M1	P. V. Sindhu (IND)	21	21

Finals
A1	Carolina Marín (ESP)	19	21	21
M1	P. V. Sindhu (IND)	21	12	15
Third place
E1	Li Xuerui (CHN)	w	/	o
J1	Nozomi Okuhara (JPN)

=== Men's doubles ===
Quarterfinals
A1	Vladimir Ivanov (RUS); Ivan Sozonov (RUS)	13	21	16
D2	Chai Biao (CHN); Hong Wei (CHN)	21	16	21
B1	Goh V Shem (MAS); Tan Wee Kiong (MAS)	17	21	21
A2	Lee Yong-dae (KOR); Yoo Yeon-seong (KOR)	21	18	19
B2	Fu Haifeng (CHN); Zhang Nan (CHN)	11	21	24
C1	Kim Gi-jung (KOR); Kim Sa-rang (KOR)	21	18	22
C2	Marcus Ellis (GBR); Chris Langridge (GBR)	21	21
D1	Hiroyuki Endo (JPN); Kenichi Hayakawa (JPN)	19	17

Semifinals
D2	Chai Biao (CHN); Hong Wei (CHN)	18	21	17
B1	Goh V Shem (MAS); Tan Wee Kiong (MAS)	21	12	21
B2	Fu Haifeng (CHN); Zhang Nan (CHN)	21	21
C2	Marcus Ellis (GBR); Chris Langridge (GBR)	14	18

Finals
B1	Goh V Shem (MAS); Tan Wee Kiong (MAS)	21	11	21
B2	Fu Haifeng (CHN); Zhang Nan (CHN)	16	21	23
Third place
D2	Chai Biao (CHN); Hong Wei (CHN)	18	21	10
C2	Chris Langridge (GBR); Marcus Ellis (GBR)	21	19	21

=== Women's doubles ===
Quarterfinals
A1	Misaki Matsutomo (JPN); Ayaka Takahashi (JPN)	21	18	21
C2	Vivian Hoo Kah Mun (MAS); Woon Khe Wei (MAS)	16	21	9
B1	Jung Kyung-eun (KOR); Shin Seung-chan (KOR)	21	20	21
A2	Eefje Muskens (NED); Selena Piek (NED)	13	22	14
D2	Tang Yuanting (CHN); Yu Yang (CHN)	21	21
C1	Nitya Krishinda Maheswari (INA); Greysia Polii (INA)	11	14
B2	Christinna Pedersen (DEN); Kamilla Rytter Juhl (DEN)	28	18	21
D1	Chang Ye-na (KOR); Lee So-hee (KOR)	26	21	15

Semifinals
A1	Misaki Matsutomo (JPN); Ayaka Takahashi (JPN)	21	21
B1	Jung Kyung-eun (KOR); Shin Seung-chan (KOR)	16	15
D2	Tang Yuanting (CHN); Yu Yang (CHN)	16	21	19
B2	Christinna Pedersen (DEN); Kamilla Rytter Juhl (DEN)	21	14	21

Finals
A1	Misaki Matsutomo (JPN); Ayaka Takahashi (JPN)	18	21	21
B2	Christinna Pedersen (DEN); Kamilla Rytter Juhl (DEN)	21	9	19
Third place
B1	Jung Kyung-eun (KOR); Shin Seung-chan (KOR)	21	21
D2	Tang Yuanting (CHN); Yu Yang (CHN)	8	17

=== Mixed doubles ===
Quarterfinals
A1	Zhang Nan (CHN); Zhao Yunlei (CHN)	21	21
D2	Kenta Kazuno (JPN); Ayane Kurihara (JPN)	14	12
C1	Tontowi Ahmad (INA); Liliyana Natsir (INA)	21	21
A2	Praveen Jordan (INA); Debby Susanto (INA)	16	11
C2	Chan Peng Soon (MAS); Goh Liu Ying (MAS)	21	21
B1	Robert Mateusiak (POL); Nadieżda Zięba (POL)	17	10
B2	Xu Chen (CHN); Ma Jin (CHN)	21	21
D1	Ko Sung-hyun (KOR); Kim Ha-na (KOR)	17	18

Semifinals
A1	Zhang Nan (CHN); Zhao Yunlei (CHN)	16	15
C1	Tontowi Ahmad (INA); Liliyana Natsir (INA)	21	21
C2	Chan Peng Soon (MAS); Goh Liu Ying (MAS)	21	21
B2	Xu Chen (CHN); Ma Jin (CHN)	12	19

Finals
C1	Tontowi Ahmad (INA); Liliyana Natsir (INA)	21	21
C2	Chan Peng Soon (MAS); Goh Liu Ying (MAS)	14	12
Third place
A1	Zhang Nan (CHN); Zhao Yunlei (CHN)	21	21
B2	Xu Chen (CHN); Ma Jin (CHN)	7	11
