= Diving at the 2010 South American Games – Men's 10 m platform =

Event

The Men's 10m Platform event at the 2010 South American Games was held on March 23 at 14:00.

== Medalists ==
| Gold | Silver | Bronze |
|---|---|---|
| Victor Hugo Serna; Colombia | Sebastian Castañeda; Colombia | Hugo Parisi; Brazil |

== Results ==
| Rank | Athlete | Dives | | | | | | Result |
| Rank | Athlete | 1 | 2 | 3 | 4 | 5 | 6 | Result |
|---|---|---|---|---|---|---|---|---|
| 1st place, gold medalist(s) | Victor Hugo Serna (COL) | 83.20 | 79.50 | 70.95 | 90.75 | 77.55 | 67.20 | 469.15 |
| 2nd place, silver medalist(s) | Sebastian Castañeda (COL) | 84.80 | 67.50 | 69.30 | 78.40 | 82.50 | 82.50 | 465.00 |
| 3rd place, bronze medalist(s) | Hugo Parisi (BRA) | 73.60 | 66.00 | 78.40 | 80.85 | 79.20 | 72.60 | 450.65 |
| 4 | Rui Marinho (BRA) | 69.00 | 65.60 | 74.25 | 44.55 | 68.80 | 50.40 | 372.60 |
