= Diving at the 2010 South American Games – Men's 1 m springboard =

The Men's 1m Springboard event at the 2010 South American Games was held on March 22 at 14:15.

== Medalists ==
Gold	Silver	Bronze
Miguel Angel Abadia; Colombia	Sebastian Castañeda; Colombia	Ian Matos; Brazil

== Results ==
Rank	Athlete	Dives						Result
Rank	Athlete	1	2	3	4	5	6	Result
1st place, gold medalist(s)	Miguel Angel Abadia (COL)	63.70	64.50	58.50	74.40	72.00	59.80	392.90
2nd place, silver medalist(s)	Sebastian Castañeda (COL)	63.75	40.50	67.50	69.00	63.70	86.70	391.15
3rd place, bronze medalist(s)	Ian Matos (BRA)	59.80	74.40	61.50	56.35	61.50	52.80	366.35
4	Diego Saavedra (CHI)	50.40	42.90	48.30	10.80	54.60	52.50	259.50
5	Donato Escudero (CHI)	54.60	0.00	22.80	46.00	60.45	54.60	238.45
