= Diving at the 2016 Summer Olympics – Men's 10 metre platform =

Men's 10 metre platform diving at the Games of the XXXI Olympiad
- Venue: Maria Lenk Aquatic Center
- Date: 19–20 August 2016
- Competitors: 28 from 18 nations
- Winning total: 585.30 points

Medalists
1st place, gold medalist(s)		Chen Aisen	China
2nd place, silver medalist(s)		Germán Sánchez	Mexico
3rd place, bronze medalist(s)		David Boudia	United States

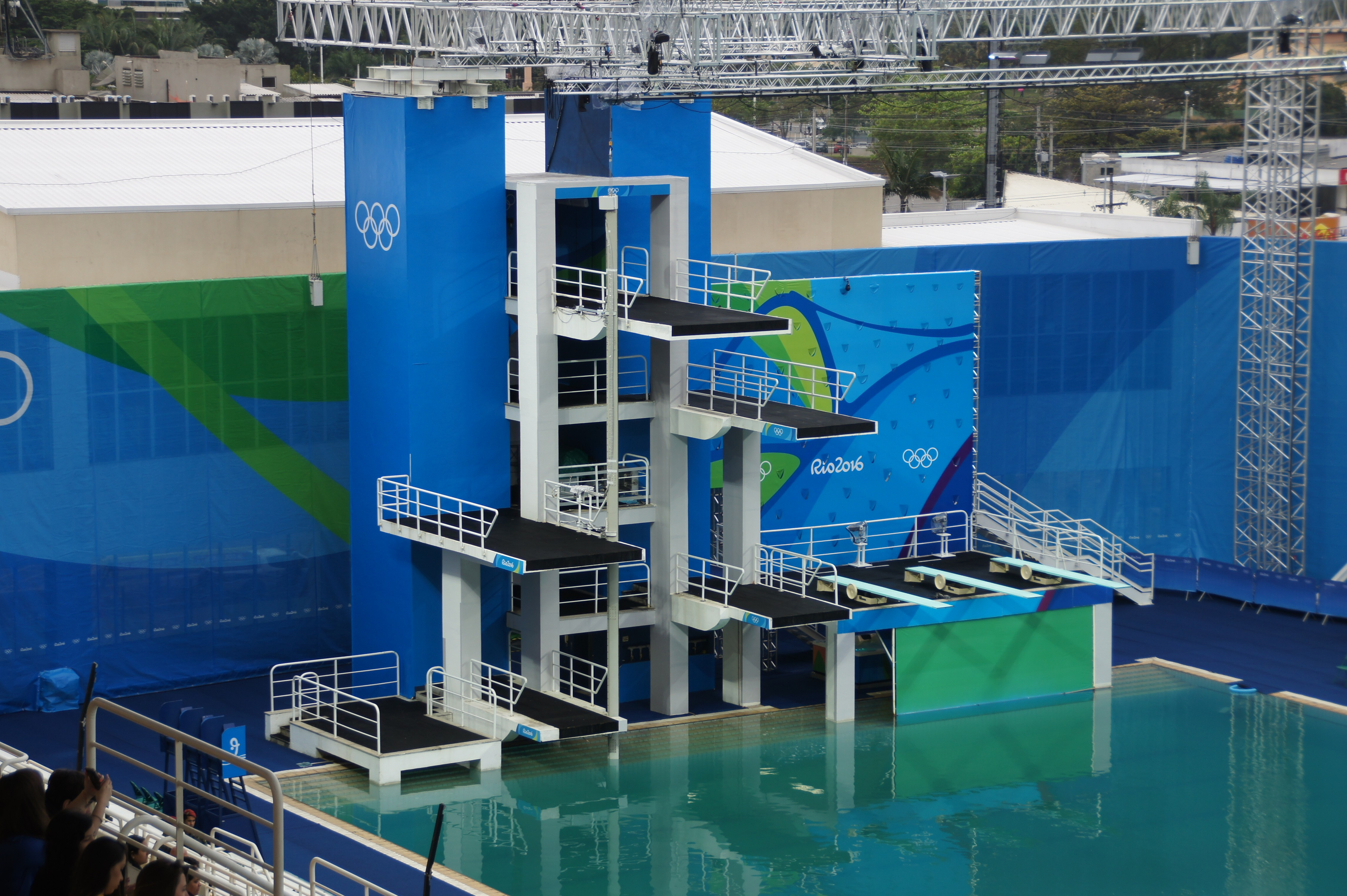
The diving platform at 2016 Rio polo aquatico

The men's 10 metre platform diving competition at the 2016 Olympic Games in Rio de Janeiro took place on 19 and 20 August at the Maria Lenk Aquatic Center within the Olympic Park.

The competition comprised three rounds:

- Preliminary round: All divers performed six dives; the top 18 divers advanced to the semi-final.
- Semi-final: The 18 divers performed six dives; the scores of the preliminaries were erased and the top 12 divers advanced to the final.
- Final: The 12 divers performed six dives; the semi-final scores were erased and the top three divers won the gold, silver and bronze medals accordingly.

== Schedule ==
All times are Brasília time (UTC-3)

Date	Time	Round
Friday, 19 August 2016	16:00	Preliminary
Saturday, 20 August 2016	11:00; 16:30	Semi-final; Final

== Results ==
Rank	Diver	Nation	Preliminary		Semi-final		Final						
Rank	Diver	Nation	Points	Rank	Points	Rank	Dive 1	Dive 2	Dive 3	Dive 4	Dive 5	Dive 6	Points
1st place, gold medalist(s)	Chen Aisen	China	545.35	3	559.90	1	96.90	78.75	102.60	93.60	105.45	108.00	585.30
2nd place, silver medalist(s)	Germán Sánchez	Mexico	430.05	12	462.05	9	84.15	81.60	82.50	98.05	95.20	91.20	532.70
3rd place, bronze medalist(s)	David Boudia	United States	496.55	4	458.35	10	88.20	94.40	81.60	90.00	102.60	68.45	525.25
4	Benjamin Auffret	France	470.45	5	477.00	4	80.00	86.70	76.50	94.05	89.10	81.00	507.35
5	Martin Wolfram	Germany	468.80	6	466.15	8	90.00	76.80	95.20	59.40	86.40	85.10	492.90
6	Qiu Bo	China	564.75	2	504.70	2	94.50	47.25	102.00	102.60	47.50	94.35	488.20
7	Rafael Quintero	Puerto Rico	456.55	10	471.20	7	65.60	90.65	81.60	81.60	79.20	86.70	485.35
8	Viktor Minibaev	Russia	462.25	8	474.10	6	81.60	70.30	86.70	79.20	72.00	91.80	481.60
9	Sascha Klein	Germany	463.40	7	475.00	5	65.60	90.65	94.50	37.80	81.60	54.00	424.15
10	Iván García	Mexico	418.90	15	497.55	3	88.80	73.80	54.00	91.80	30.75	79.80	418.95
11	Woo Ha-ram	South Korea	438.45	11	453.85	12	76.50	81.60	85.00	57.60	47.25	66.60	414.55
12	Domonic Bedggood	Australia	413.85	17	454.95	11	72.00	86.40	68.45	44.55	44.20	88.20	403.80
13	Steele Johnson	United States	403.75	18	447.85	13	Did not advance						
14	Vincent Riendeau	Canada	419.50	14	436.30	14	Did not advance						
15	James Connor	Australia	457.05	9	419.10	15	Did not advance						
16	Hugo Parisi	Brazil	422.45	13	417.15	16	Did not advance						
17	Nikita Shleikher	Russia	418.15	16	415.75	17	Did not advance						
18	Tom Daley	Great Britain	571.85	1	403.25	18	Did not advance						
19	Maxim Bouchard	Canada	398.15	19	Did not advance								
20	Víctor Ortega	Colombia	386.85	20	Did not advance								
21	Jesús Liranzo	Venezuela	385.55	21	Did not advance								
22	Ooi Tze Liang	Malaysia	379.50	22	Did not advance								
23	Robert Páez	Venezuela	378.20	23	Did not advance								
24	Vadim Kaptur	Belarus	353.85	24	Did not advance								
25	Sebastián Villa	Colombia	350.40	25	Did not advance								
26	Yauheni Karaliou	Belarus	347.80	26	Did not advance								
27	Maicol Verzotto	Italy	313.10	27	Did not advance								
28	Mohab El-Kordy	Egypt	305.50	28	Did not advance								
