= Diving at the 2010 South American Games =

- Dates: March 20–23

There were ten diving events at the 2010 South American Games. The events were held over March 20–23.

== Medal summary ==
=== Medal table ===
Rank	Nation	Gold	Silver	Bronze	Total
1	Colombia (COL)	8	5	1	14
2	Brazil (BRA)	2	4	6	12
3	Chile (CHI)	0	1	1	2
4	Ecuador (ECU)	0	0	2	2
Totals (4 entries)		10	10	10	30

=== Medalists ===
Event	Gold	Silver	Bronze
Men's events
Men's 1m springboard	Miguel Angel Abadia; Colombia	Sebastian Castañeda; Colombia	Ian Matos; Brazil
Men's 3m springboard	Juan Urán; Colombia	Sebastian Castañeda; Colombia	Ian Matos; Brazil
Men's 10m platform	Víctor Ortega; Colombia	Sebastian Castañeda; Colombia	Hugo Parisi; Brazil
Men's synchronized 3m springboard	Juan Urán; Víctor Ortega; Colombia	Diego Carquin; Donato Neglia; Chile	Ian Matos; Rui Machado; Brazil
Men's synchronized 10m platform	Juan Urán; Víctor Ortega; Colombia	Hugo Parisi; Rui Marinho; Brazil	Diego Carquin; Donato Neglia; Chile
Women's events
Women's 1m springboard	Diana Pineda; Colombia	Juliana Veloso; Brazil	Milena Sae; Brazil
Women's 3m springboard	Juliana Veloso; Brazil	Diana Pineda; Colombia	Tammy Takagi; Brazil
Women's 10m platform	Diana Pineda; Colombia	Milena Sae; Brazil	Carolina Murillo; Colombia
Women's synchronized 3m springboard	Juliana Veloso; Tammy Takagi; Brazil	Diana Pineda; Manuela Ríos; Colombia	Norka Sabando; Rafaela Suárez; Ecuador
Women's synchronized 10m platform	Sara Bedoya; Carolina Murillo; Colombia	Nicoli Cruz; Milena Sae; Brazil	Norka Sabando; Rafaela Suárez; Ecuador
