= Ren Qian =

Chinese diver

Personal information
- Born: 20 February 2001 (age 25) Dujiangyan, Chengdu, Sichuan, China
- Height: 1.62 m (5 ft 4 in)
- Weight: 49 kg (108 lb)

Sport
- Country: China
- Sport: Diving
Medal record
Olympic Games
Gold medal – first place	2016 Rio de Janeiro	10 m platform
World Championships
Gold medal – first place	2017 Budapest	10m platform synchro
Gold medal – first place	2017 Budapest	10m platform mixed synchro
Gold medal – first place	2022 Budapest	10m platform mixed synchro
Silver medal – second place	2015 Kazan	10m platform
Bronze medal – third place	2017 Budapest	10 m platform

Ren Xi (Chinese: 任茜; pinyin: Rén Qiàn; born 20 February 2001), known internationally as Ren Qian, is a Chinese diver. She won a silver medal in the women's 10 m platform at the 2015 World Aquatics Championships, and then followed it with a gold at the 2016 Summer Olympics in Rio de Janeiro, becoming the youngest champion to top the podium (aged 15).

Ren was selected to the Chinese diving squad for the 2016 Summer Olympics in Rio de Janeiro, competing individually in the women's 10 m platform. There, she comfortably claimed the gold with a total score of 439.25, making her the youngest champion at the Games and the only one from the championship field to tally more than 90 points on a single dive.

== See also ==
- China at the 2015 World Aquatics Championships
