= Hanna Krasnoshlyk =

Ukrainian diver (born 1996)

Personal information
- Nationality: Ukrainian
- Born: 6 March 1996 (age 30)

Sport
- Sport: Diving
- Event: 10 metre platform
Medal record
women's diving
Representing Ukraine
Youth Olympic Games
| Silver medal – second place | 2014 Nanjing | 3 m springboard |
European Aquatics Championships
| Silver medal – second place | 2016 London | 10 m synchronized platform |
European Junior Diving Championships
| Silver medal – second place | 2011 Belgrade | 10 m platform |
| Silver medal – second place | 2013 Poznań | 3 m synchro |
| Silver medal – second place | 2014 Bergamo | 3 m springboard |
| Silver medal – second place | 2014 Bergamo | 10 m platform |
| Bronze medal – third place | 2012 Graz | 3 m synchro |
| Bronze medal – third place | 2013 Poznań | 3 m springboard |
| Bronze medal – third place | 2014 Bergamo | 3 m synchro |

Hanna Krasnoshlyk (born 6 March 1996) is a Ukrainian diver. She competed in the women's 10 metre platform at the 2016 Summer Olympics, where she finished 16th out of 28 competitors.
