= Diving at the 2016 Summer Olympics – Men's synchronized 3 metre springboard =

Men's synchronised 3 metre springboard at the Games of the XXXI Olympiad
- Venue: Maria Lenk Aquatic Center
- Date: 10 August 2016
- Competitors: 16 from 8 nations
- Teams: 8 pairs
- Winning total: 454.32 points

Medalists
1st place, gold medalist(s)		Chris Mears; Jack Laugher	Great Britain
2nd place, silver medalist(s)		Sam Dorman; Michael Hixon	United States
3rd place, bronze medalist(s)		Cao Yuan; Qin Kai	China

The men's synchronised 3 metre springboard diving competition at the 2016 Summer Olympics in Rio de Janeiro took place on 10 August 2016 at the Maria Lenk Aquatic Center in Barra da Tijuca.

== Competition format ==
The competition was held in a single stage with each two-person team making six rounds of dives. There were eleven judges scoring each dive made by each team - three judges for each diver, six in total; and five judges for synchronisation. Only the middle score counted for each diver, with the middle three counting for synchronisation. These five scores were averaged, multiplied by 3, and multiplied by the dive's degree of difficulty to give a total dive score. The scores for each of the six dives were summed to give a final score.

== Schedule ==
All times are Brasília time (UTC−3)

Date	Time	Round
Wednesday, 10 August 2016	16:00	Final

== Results ==
Rank	Nation	Dives						Total
Rank	Nation	1	2	3	4	5	6	Total
1st place, gold medalist(s)	Great Britain; Chris Mears; Jack Laugher	52.80	53.40	84.66	85.68	86.58	91.20	454.32
2nd place, silver medalist(s)	United States; Sam Dorman; Michael Hixon	50.40	50.40	85.68	87.15	78.54	98.04	450.21
3rd place, bronze medalist(s)	China; Cao Yuan; Qin Kai	54.00	54.00	79.56	82.62	90.30	83.22	443.70
4	Germany; Stephan Feck; Patrick Hausding	52.80	51.60	80.19	74.55	69.36	81.60	410.10
5	Mexico; Jahir Ocampo; Rommel Pacheco	51.00	50.40	82.62	69.30	74.46	77.52	405.30
6	Italy; Andrea Chiarabini; Giovanni Tocci	52.80	51.00	80.58	64.98	70.35	75.48	395.19
7	Russia; Evgeny Kuznetsov; Ilya Zakharov	53.40	51.60	76.50	62.01	63.00	78.66	385.17
8	Brazil; Ian Matos; Luiz Outerelo	48.60	28.80	61.38	66.33	70.38	57.12	332.61
