= Diving at the 2016 Summer Olympics – Women's 10 metre platform =

Women's 10 metre platform diving at the Games of the XXXI Olympiad
- Venue: Maria Lenk Aquatic Center
- Date: 17–18 August 2016
- Competitors: 28 from 19 nations
- Winning total: 439.25 points

Medalists
1st place, gold medalist(s)		Ren Qian	China
2nd place, silver medalist(s)		Si Yajie	China
3rd place, bronze medalist(s)		Meaghan Benfeito	Canada

The women's 10 metre platform diving competition at the 2016 Olympic Games in Rio de Janeiro took place on 17 and 18 August at the Maria Lenk Aquatic Center within the Olympic Park.

The competition comprised three rounds:

- Preliminary round: All divers perform five dives; the top 18 divers advance to the semi-final.
- Semi-final: The 18 divers perform five dives; the scores of the qualifications are erased and the top 12 divers advance to the final.
- Final: The 12 divers perform five dives; the semi-final scores are erased and the top three divers win the gold, silver and bronze medals accordingly.

== Schedule ==
All times are Brasília time (UTC-3)

Date	Time	Round
Wednesday, 17 August 2016	14:00	Preliminary
Thursday, 18 August 2016	10:00; 16:00	Semi-final; Final

== Results ==
Ref:

Rank	Diver	Nation	Preliminary		Semi-final		Final					
Rank	Diver	Nation	Points	Rank	Points	Rank	Dive 1	Dive 2	Dive 3	Dive 4	Dive 5	Points
1st place, gold medalist(s)	Ren Qian	China	385.80	2	362.40	3	78.00	84.80	94.05	91.20	91.20	439.25
2nd place, silver medalist(s)	Si Yajie	China	397.45	1	389.30	1	81.00	86.40	86.40	79.20	86.40	419.40
3rd place, bronze medalist(s)	Meaghan Benfeito	Canada	329.15	7	332.80	9	81.60	78.00	79.20	76.80	73.60	389.20
4	Paola Espinosa	Mexico	313.70	13	306.45	12	66.00	75.90	81.60	81.60	72.00	377.10
5	Melissa Wu	Australia	342.80	4	346.00	4	73.50	72.00	75.60	81.60	66.50	368.30
6	Roseline Filion	Canada	323.55	9	336.80	7	71.40	85.80	76.50	47.85	86.40	367.95
7	Kim Un-hyang	North Korea	289.45	18	343.70	5	70.50	72.00	56.10	82.50	76.80	357.90
8	Minami Itahashi	Japan	320.20	10	335.55	8	73.60	58.50	69.30	72.00	83.20	356.60
9	Nur Dhabitah Sabri	Malaysia	325.85	8	307.65	11	72.00	75.20	59.40	59.40	72.00	338.00
10	Jessica Parratto	United States	346.80	3	367.00	2	81.00	79.20	44.80	52.80	76.80	334.60
11	Pandelela Rinong	Malaysia	332.45	6	336.95	6	72.00	53.65	72.00	73.60	59.20	330.45
12	Tonia Couch	Great Britain	332.80	5	318.00	10	64.50	67.20	52.80	72.00	67.20	323.70
13	Katrina Young	United States	313.85	12	301.45	13	Did not advance					
14	Iuliia Prokopchuk	Ukraine	297.95	15	300.65	14	Did not advance					
15	Brittany O'Brien	Australia	290.30	17	300.05	15	Did not advance					
16	Hanna Krasnoshlyk	Ukraine	300.80	14	295.45	16	Did not advance					
17	Elena Wassen	Germany	291.90	16	276.70	17	Did not advance					
18	Ekaterina Petukhova	Russia	317.25	11	259.50	18	Did not advance					
19	Laura Marino	France	289.35	19	Did not advance							
20	Alejandra Orozco	Mexico	287.45	20	Did not advance							
21	Maria Kurjo	Germany	287.00	21	Did not advance							
22	Ingrid Oliveira	Brazil	281.90	22	Did not advance							
23	Sarah Barrow	Great Britain	277.40	23	Did not advance							
24	Maha Gouda	Egypt	276.15	24	Did not advance							
25	Kim Kuk-hyang	North Korea	263.20	25	Did not advance							
26	Noemi Batki	Italy	256.90	26	Did not advance							
27	Villő Kormos	Hungary	227.70	27	Did not advance							
28	Yulia Timoshinina	Russia	212.25	28	Did not advance							
