= Sam Dorman =

American diver (born 1991)

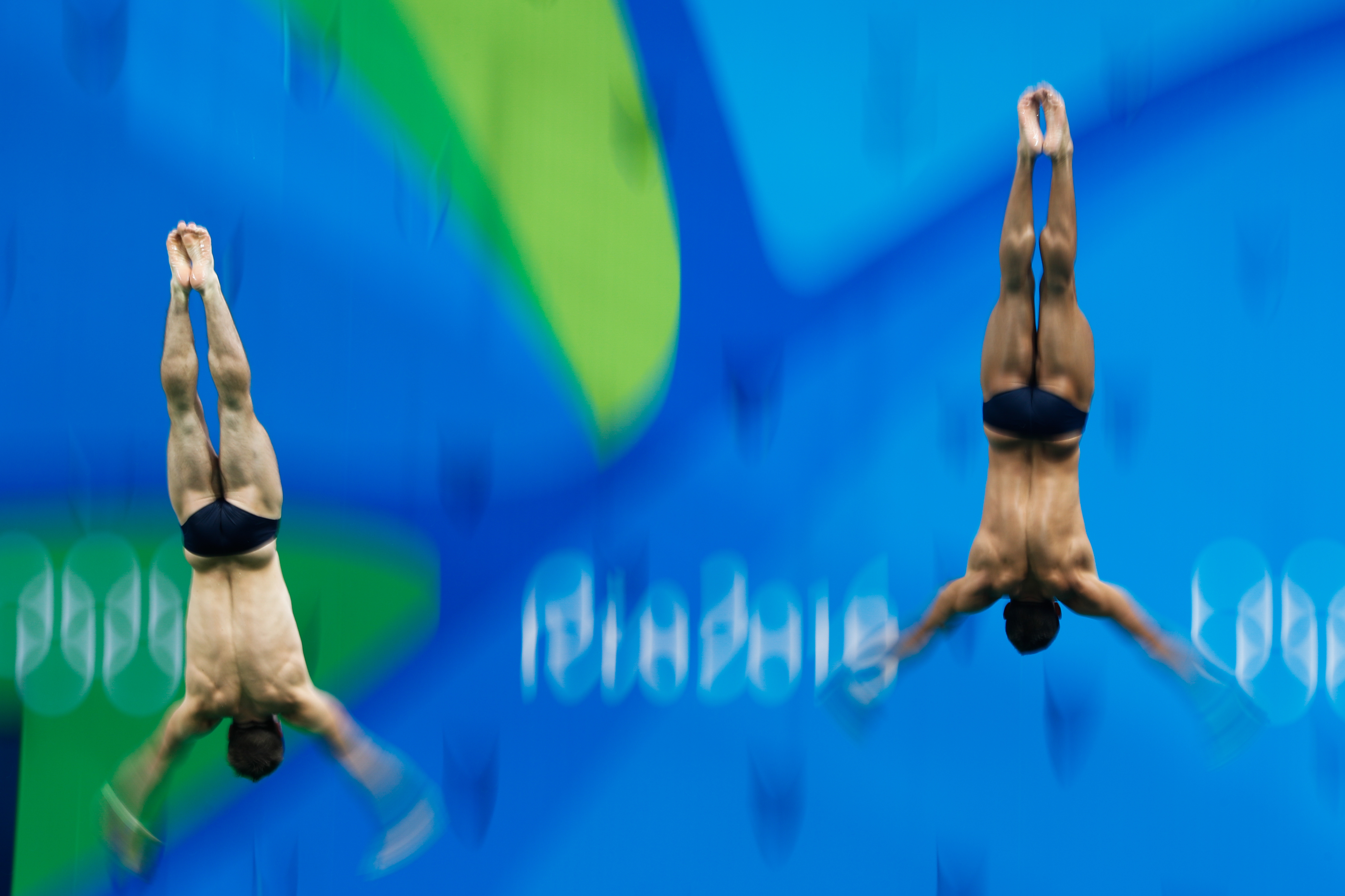
- Mike Hixon and Sam Dorman (right) at the 2016 Olympics

Personal information
- Nationality: American
- Born: August 30, 1991 (age 34)
- Height: 1.76 m (5 ft 9 in)
- Weight: 77 kg (170 lb)

Sport
- Country: United States
- Sport: Diving
Medal record
Men's diving
Representing United States
Olympic Games
Silver medal – second place	2016 Rio de Janeiro	3 m synchro

Sam Dorman (born August 30, 1991) is a retired American diver. He represented his country at the 2016 Summer Olympics where he, along with his diving partner Michael Hixon, won a silver medal in the 3-meter springboard synchro event. Dorman attended the University of Miami.

== Early life ==
Sam Dorman was born to Marla and Paul Dorman and grew up in Tempe, Arizona. He attended Marcos de Niza High School in Tempe, and then went to University of Miami where he majored in mechanical engineering.

Dorman began learning to dive when he was eight, and started to compete in diving competition when he was nine.

He has a brother named Benjamin Dorman, more famously known as the EDM record producer and DJ Bijou.

== Diving career ==
Dorman won three gold medals, on the 1- and 3-meter springboard events and the 3-meter synchro with Zac Nees, at the AT&T National Diving Championships in Iowa City in 2013. In 2015, he won the 3-meter individual springboard at the NCAA Swimming and Diving Championships with a diving record of 529.10 points.

Dorman partnered for a time with Kristian Ipsen in 2015 and early 2016, but teamed up with Michael Hixon after team changes in March 2016. Dorman and Hixon won the U.S. trials in their first competition together.

At the Rio Olympics, in their first international meet as diving partners, Dorman and Hixon won the silver medal in the 3m synchro with a score of 450.21, behind Jack Laugher and Chris Mears of Great Britain (454.32) but ahead of the Chinese pair Qin Kai and Cao Yuan (443.70).
