= Luiz Outerelo =

Brazilian diver

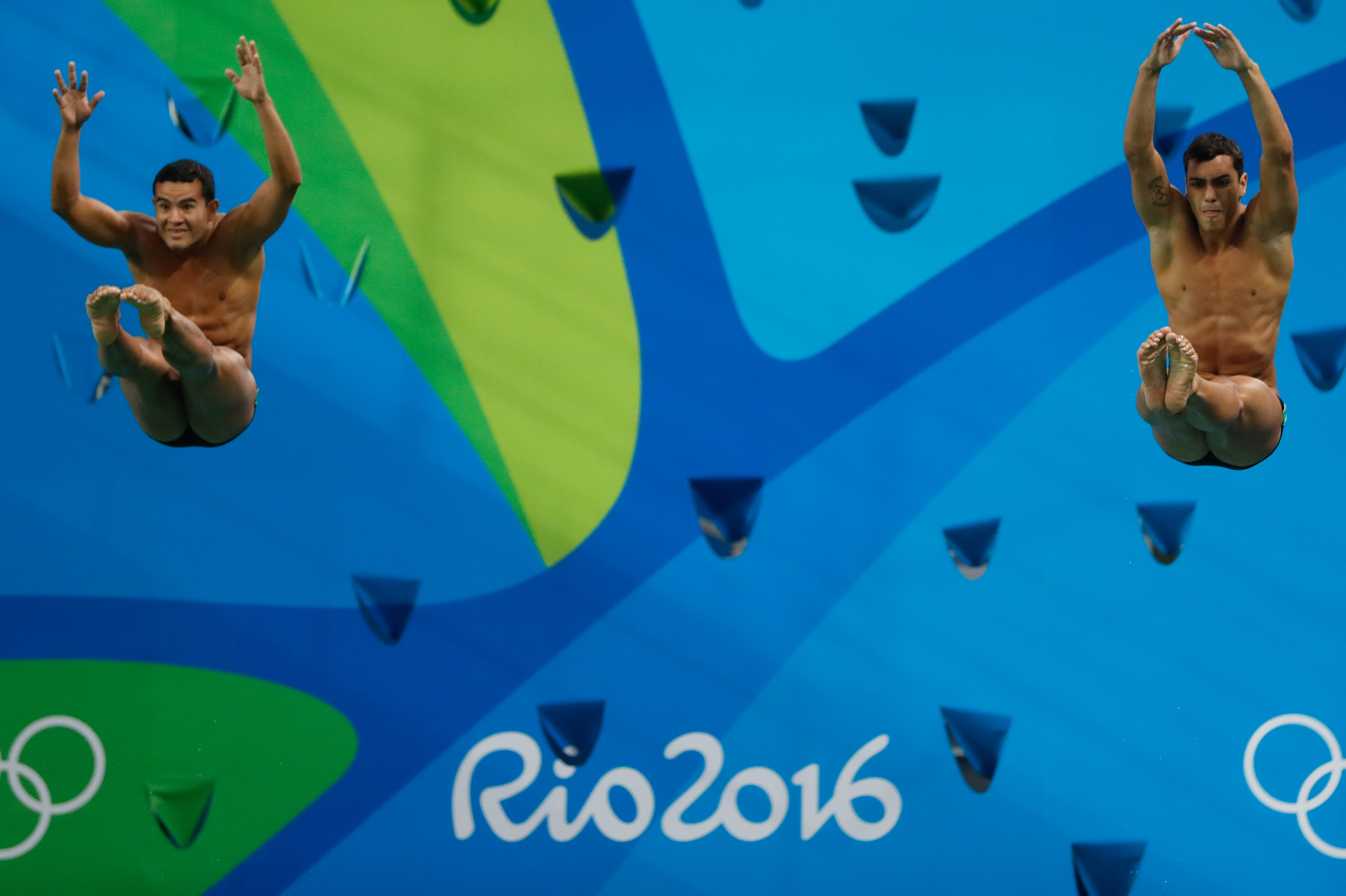
- Ian Matos and Outerelo at the 2016 Olympics

Personal information
- Full name: Luiz Felipe Agostin Outerelo
- Born: 11 December 1991 (age 34) Rio de Janeiro, Brazil

Sport
- Country: Brazil
- Sport: Diving

Luiz Felipe Agostin Outerelo (born 11 December 1991) is a Brazilian diver. He competed in the men's synchronized three metre springboard event at the 2016 Summer Olympics.
