= Diving at the 2016 Summer Olympics – Women's 3 metre springboard =

Women's 3 metre springboard at the Games of the XXXI Olympiad
- Venue: Maria Lenk Aquatic Center
- Date: 12–14 August 2016
- Competitors: 29 from 18 nations
- Winning total: 406.05 points

Medalists
1st place, gold medalist(s)		Shi Tingmao	China
2nd place, silver medalist(s)		He Zi	China
3rd place, bronze medalist(s)		Tania Cagnotto	Italy

The women's 3 metre springboard diving competition at the 2016 Summer Olympics in Rio de Janeiro took place from 12 to 14 August at the Maria Lenk Aquatic Center in Barra da Tijuca. Shi Tingmao and He Zi won the gold and silver medals, respectively, for China, and Tania Cagnotto won the bronze medal for Italy.

== Format ==
The competition was held in three rounds:

- Preliminary round: All 29 divers performed five dives; the top 18 divers advanced to the semi-final.
- Semi-final: The 18 divers performed five dives; the scores of the qualifications were erased and the top 12 divers advance to the final.
- Final: The 12 divers performed five dives; the semi-final scores were erased and the top three divers win the gold, silver and bronze medals accordingly.

== Schedule ==
All times are Brasília time (UTC−3)

Date	Time	Round
Friday 12 August 2016	18:30	Preliminary
Saturday 13 August 2016	19:00	Semi-final
Sunday 14 August 2016	19:00	Final

== Results ==
Rank	Diver	Nation	Preliminary		Semifinal		Final					
Rank	Diver	Nation	Points	Rank	Points	Rank	Dive 1	Dive 2	Dive 3	Dive 4	Dive 5	Points
1st place, gold medalist(s)	Shi Tingmao	China	357.55	3	385.00	1	81.00	81.00	84.00	79.05	81.00	406.05
2nd place, silver medalist(s)	He Zi	China	367.05	2	364.05	2	81.00	81.00	74.40	76.50	75.00	387.90
3rd place, bronze medalist(s)	Tania Cagnotto	Italy	347.30	4	324.40	7	76.50	75.00	71.30	69.00	81.00	372.80
4	Jennifer Abel	Canada	373.00	1	343.45	3	76.50	69.00	72.85	79.90	69.00	367.25
5	Maddison Keeney	Australia	323.35	9	326.35	4	64.50	64.50	60.00	79.05	81.60	349.65
6	Esther Qin	Australia	347.25	5	315.65	10	72.00	65.10	67.50	67.50	72.00	344.10
7	Pamela Ware	Canada	329.10	7	318.25	9	63.00	66.65	67.50	73.50	52.50	323.15
8	Grace Reid	Great Britain	304.95	14	314.25	11	63.00	65.10	58.50	64.50	67.50	318.60
9	Nora Subschinski	Germany	302.05	16	308.25	12	63.00	65.10	63.00	58.50	67.50	317.10
10	Ng Yan Yee	Malaysia	299.05	17	324.75	5	67.50	65.10	67.50	40.50	66.00	306.60
11	Olena Fedorova	Ukraine	318.10	10	321.00	8	63.00	58.50	57.00	58.80	67.50	304.80
12	Abigail Johnston	United States	333.60	6	324.75	5	67.50	60.00	41.85	67.50	66.00	302.85
13	Kassidy Cook	United States	327.75	8	304.35	13	Did not advance					
14	Uschi Freitag	Netherlands	317.10	11	298.95	14	Did not advance					
15	Kristina Ilinykh	Russia	304.05	15	295.20	15	Did not advance					
16	Dolores Hernández	Mexico	295.20	18	293.05	16	Did not advance					
17	Tina Punzel	Germany	307.95	13	291.60	17	Did not advance					
18	Anastasiia Nedobiga	Ukraine	309.50	12	290.15	18	Did not advance					
19	Maria Marconi	Italy	292.95	19	Did not advance							
20	Rebecca Gallantree	Great Britain	286.65	20	Did not advance							
21	Cheong Jun Hoong	Malaysia	282.25	21	Did not advance							
22	Melany Hernández	Mexico	279.45	22	Did not advance							
23	Diana Pineda	Colombia	276.90	23	Did not advance							
24	Elizabeth Cui	New Zealand	273.30	24	Did not advance							
25	Marcela Marić	Croatia	271.40	25	Did not advance							
26	Nadezhda Bazhina	Russia	252.00	26	Did not advance							
27	Juliana Veloso	Brazil	240.90	27	Did not advance							
28	Maha Amer	Egypt	238.55	28	Did not advance							
29	Julia Vincent	South Africa	220.30	29	Did not advance							
