= Michael Hixon =

American diver (born 1994)

Personal information
- Born: July 16, 1994 (age 31) Amherst, Massachusetts, U.S.
- Height: 5 ft 8 in (173 cm)

Sport
- Country: United States
- Event(s): 3 meter springboard, 3 meter springboard synchro
- College team: University of Texas at Austin; Indiana University Bloomington
- Coached by: Mandy Hixon; Drew Johansen
Medal record
Representing United States
Men's diving
Olympic Games
Silver medal – second place	2016 Rio de Janeiro	3 m synchro
Silver medal – second place	2020 Tokyo	3 m synchro
World Championships
Bronze medal – third place	2015 Kazan	1 m springboard
Youth Olympic Games
Bronze medal – third place	2010 Singapore	3 m springboard
Pan American Games
Bronze medal – third place	2019 Lima	3 m synchro

Michael Hixon (born July 16, 1994) is an American diver. He is a two-time Olympic medalist, having won the silver medal with Sam Dorman in the men's synchronized 3-meter springboard event at the 2016 Summer Olympics in Rio de Janeiro and the silver medal with Andrew Capobianco at the 2020 Summer Olympics in Tokyo in the same event.

== Early life and education ==
Hixon was born on July 16, 1994, in Amherst, Massachusetts, to Mandy and David Hixon. He has an older brother, Matthew.

Hixon's parents have both coached in American collegiate sports. His father was the head coach for the men's basketball team at Amherst College. His mother, an All-American diver at Ohio State University, helped foster his interest in diving after he joined her at a diving practice while she was a diving coach at Amherst College. Soon after, she became his personal coach, and he began entering competitions two years later. Growing up, Hixon was also involved in basketball, football, and lacrosse, but after foregoing them in high school, he committed to diving full-time.

He graduated from Amherst Regional High School in 2013. In 2013, he enrolled at the University of Texas in Austin, but in July 2014, he was granted a release by the university, after which he transferred to Indiana University in Bloomington, citing desire for a program that would be a better fit.

Hixon enrolled at the University of Michigan's Ross School of Business in 2020 for his Master of Business Administration (MBA). To train for the 2020 Summer Olympics, he agreed to become a volunteer assistant coach for the Michigan Wolverines swimming and diving team in order to use the pool facilities during the COVID-19 pandemic.

== Diving career ==
=== 2007–2010: Junior championships ===
Hixon began diving at the national level when he was 12 and won the 1-meter competition at the national championships three years running. Hixon is a six-time junior U.S. champion, and won two bronze medals, in the 1 meter and 3 meter events, at the 2009 Junior Pan-American Diving Championships in Calgary.

He subsequently paired with Kristian Ipsen to win a silver at the 2010 FINA World Junior Diving Championships in Tucson, Arizona, in the 3 meter synchronized springboard event, but only managed a tenth-place finish in the 3 meter solo event.

==== 2010 Summer Youth Olympics ====
Hixon won in the 3 meter springboard event at a national selection camp and qualified for Youth Olympic trials in Guadalajara, Mexico, where he won a bronze medal and thus secured a spot to represent the United States at the 2010 Summer Youth Olympics in the 3 meter springboard event.

The event in the first-ever Youth Olympics in Singapore consisted of a 15-man preliminary round and an eight-man final round. After the ten-dive preliminary round, Hixon carried over enough points into the final to begin the final round in third. Although he was sixth after his first dive in the final and fourth heading into his final dive, a poor dive by Italy's Giovanni Tocci allowed Hixon to claim bronze on his final dive, finishing with a score of 554.65 points behind Qiu Bo of China and Oleksandr Bondar of Ukraine.

=== 2011 ===
At the 2011 US National Championships, Hixon captured the senior men 1-meter springboard title at the UCLA's Spieker Aquatics Center in Los Angeles.

=== 2013 ===
Hixon won silver in the 3-meter synchro with Darian Schmidt at the 2013 AT&T National Diving Championships. Hixon qualified for his first senior international competition, the 2013 World Aquatics Championships in Barcelona, with Troy Dumais, and finished fifth in the men's 3-meter synchronized event.

=== 2014 ===
Hixon won the NCAA Division I men's swimming and diving championships titles on both the 1-meter and 3-meter springboard events in 2014.

=== 2015 ===
In the 2015 World Aquatics Championships in Kazan, Hixon won bronze in the men's 1-meter dive.

=== 2016 ===
Hixon won the 1-meter springboard at the 2016 USA Diving Winter National Championship.

==== Summer Olympics ====
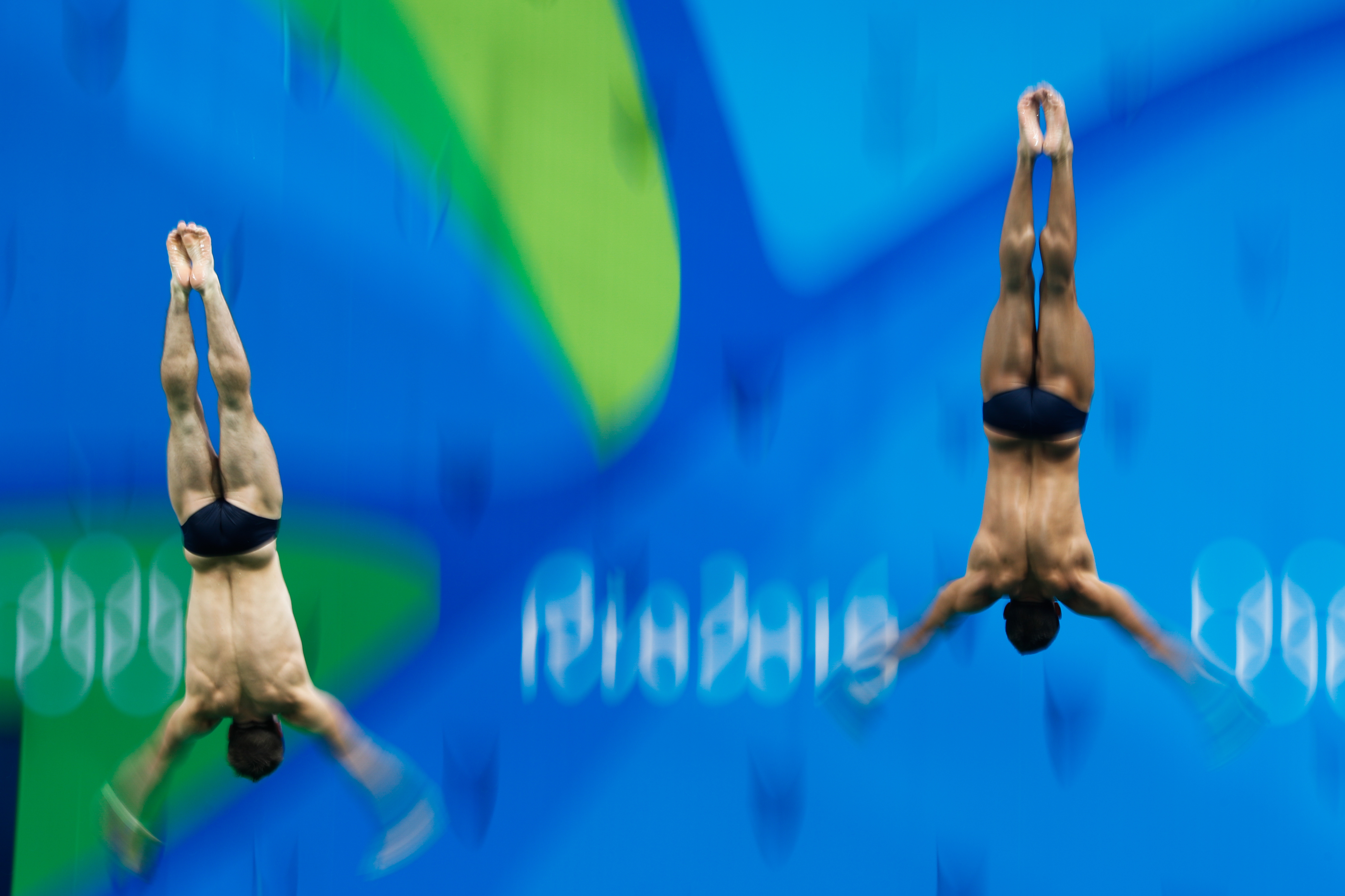
Hixon (left) and Sam Dorman (right) at the 2016 Summer Olympics

Hixon qualified for and represented the United States in both the 3-meter synchronized and men's individual 3-meter springboard events at the 2016 Summer Olympics in Rio. He teamed up with Sam Dorman on the 3-metre synchro only after team changes in March 2016, but won the U.S. trials in their first competition together in June 2016.

In the men's synchronized 3-meter springboard event, Hixon along with his diving partner Sam Dorman placed second and won the silver medal with a score of 450.21, behind Jack Laugher and Chris Mears of Great Britain (454.32) and ahead of the Chinese pair Qin Kai and Cao Yuan (443.70).

In the men's individual 3-meter springboard event, he finished 10th, while his former 3-meter synchro partner Kristian Ipsen placed fifth in the same event.

=== 2019 ===
Hixon and new partner Andrew Capobianco attended the 2019 World Aquatics Championships and placed eighth after the final round of the men's synchronized 3-meter springboard event, totaling 388.08.

=== 2021 ===
Hixon understood that his score at the 2019 World Championships had not been high enough for him and Capobianco to automatically qualify for the Olympics, and he continued training in 2020 in preparation for trials, in spite of the narrowing chances that he would be able to attend the Olympics amid the COVID-19 pandemic when crucial meets had become postponed or cancelled. However, Hixon and Capobianco were unexpectedly chosen to represent the United States at the 2021 FINA Diving World Cup after fellow American pair David Boudia and Steele Johnson abruptly pulled out eight days prior to the start of the competition. For the men's synchronized 3-meter springboard event, Hixon and Capobianco scored a total of 414.18, which landed them in fourth place and ensured their spot at the Olympics.

==== Summer Olympics ====
In June 2021, Hixon and Capobianco placed first in the United States Olympics diving trials for the men's synchronized 3-meter springboard event with a score of 1289.37.

In the men's synchronized 3-meter springboard event, Hixon and Capobianco placed second and won the silver medal with a final score of 444.36, behind Wang Zongyuan and Xie Siyi of China (467.82), and ahead of Patrick Hausding and Lars Rüdiger of Germany (404.73). They stood in fifth place after performing their first two dives, and then placed second behind leaders Wang and Xie after the next two dives. Their fifth of the sixth dives were the best of the round, and their overall score of the six dives ultimately placed them second.

== Personal life ==
As of July 2021, Hixon has been in a relationship with Canadian swimmer Kennedy Goss.
