= Mexico at the 2016 Summer Olympics =

- IOC code: MEX
- NOC: Mexican Olympic Committee
- Website: soycom.org (in Spanish)

in Rio de Janeiro
- Competitors: 124 in 26 sports
- Flag bearers: Daniela Campuzano (opening); María Espinoza (closing)
- Medals Ranked 61st: Gold 0 Silver 3 Bronze 2 Total 5

Summer Olympics appearances (overview)
- 1900; 1904–1920; 1924; 1928; 1932; 1936; 1948; 1952; 1956; 1960; 1964; 1968; 1972; 1976; 1980; 1984; 1988; 1992; 1996; 2000; 2004; 2008; 2012; 2016; 2020; 2024; 2028

Mexico competed at the 2016 Summer Olympics in Rio de Janeiro, Brazil, from 5 to 21 August 2016. This was the nation's twenty-third appearance at the Summer Olympics. The Mexican Olympic Committee (Spanish: Comité Olímpico Mexicano) sent the nation's largest delegation to the Games since 1972, with a total of 124 athletes, 80 men and 44 women, competing across 26 sports.

Mexico left Rio de Janeiro with five medals (three silver and two bronze), failing to win a single gold for the first time since the 2004 Summer Olympics in Athens. Among the medalists were race walker María Guadalupe González, semi-pro boxer Misael Rodríguez (men's middleweight), and modern pentathlete Ismael Hernández, who became the first ever Mexican to ascend the Olympic podium in his signature sport. Diver Germán Sánchez picked up his first individual medal at the Games with a silver in the men's platform, following a runner-up effort with his synchronized diving partner Iván García from London 2012. Taekwondo fighter María Espinoza made history as the first Mexican female to complete a full set of medals in three different Games, adding a silver to her Olympic career haul in the women's +67 kg.

Apart from the success and historic firsts of the medalists, several Mexican athletes reached further to the finals of their respective sporting events, but came closest to the podium finish. Among them were shooter Alejandra Zavala (fourth, women's air pistol), weightlifter Bredni Roque (fourth, men's 69 kg), former Youth Olympian Diego del Real (fourth, hammer throw), diving veteran Paola Espinosa (fourth, women's platform), and archer Alejandra Valencia (fourth, women's individual recurve).

== Medalists ==
Medal	Name	Sport	Event	Date
Silver	María Guadalupe González	Athletics	Women's 20 km walk	19 August
Silver	German Sanchez	Diving	Men's 10 m platform	20 August
Silver	María Espinoza	Taekwondo	Women's +67 kg	20 August
Bronze	Misael Rodríguez	Boxing	Men's middleweight	18 August
Bronze	Ismael Hernández	Modern pentathlon	Men's event	20 August

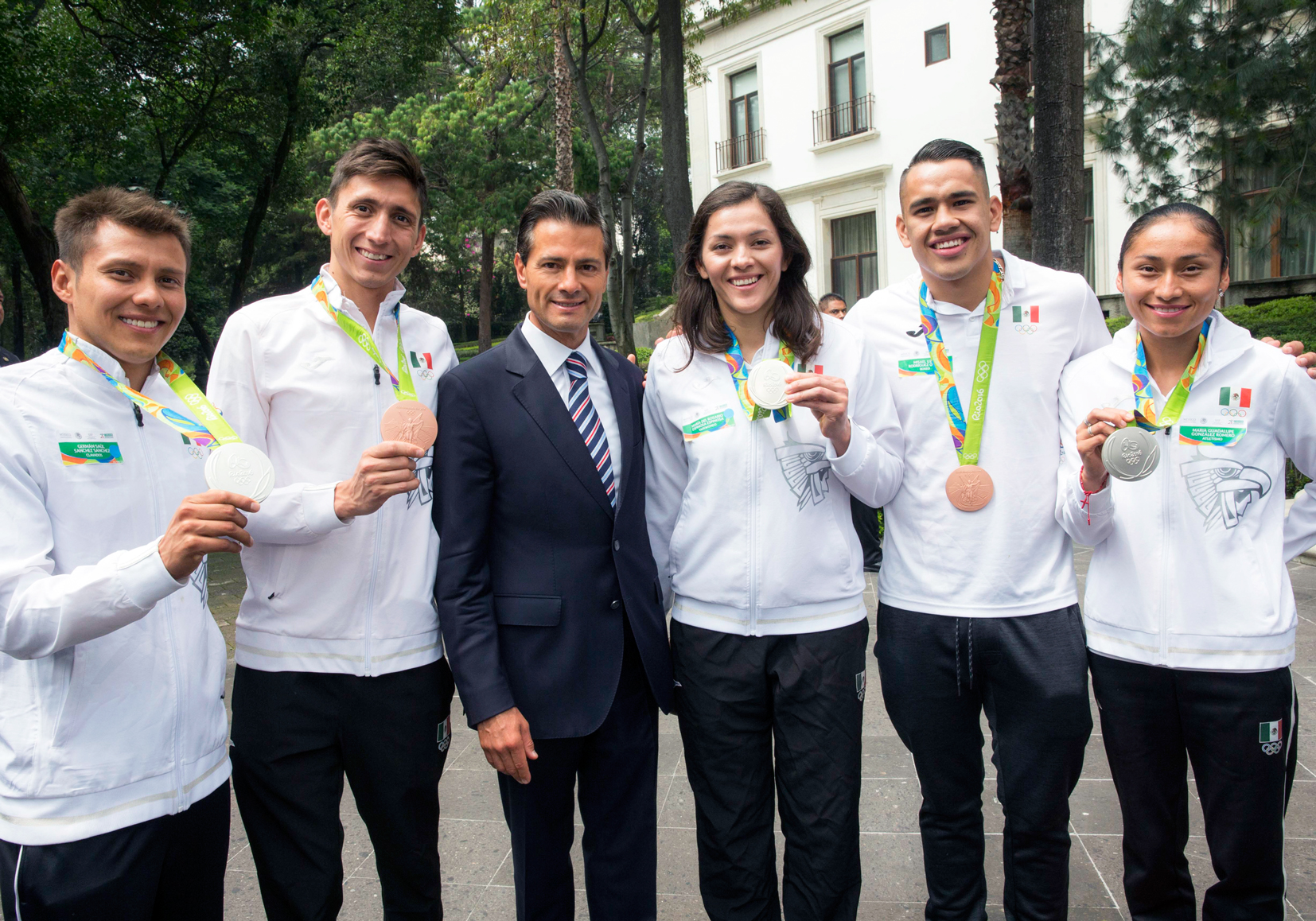
Left to right: diver Germán Sánchez, modern pentathlete Ismael Hernández, President Enrique Peña Nieto, taekwondo fighter María Espinoza, boxer Misael Rodríguez and race walker María Guadalupe González.

Medals by date
Date	Gold medal	Silver medal	Bronze medal	Total
6 August	0	0	0	0
7 August	0	0	0	0
8 August	0	0	0	0
9 August	0	0	0	0
10 August	0	0	0	0
11 August	0	0	0	0
12 August	0	0	0	0
13 August	0	0	0	0
14 August	0	0	0	0
15 August	0	0	0	0
16 August	0	0	0	0
17 August	0	0	0	0
18 August	0	0	0	0
19 August	0	1	0	1
20 August	0	2	2	4
21 August	0	0	0	0
Total	0	3	2	5

== Competitors ==
The Mexican Olympic Committee (Spanish: Comité Olímpico Mexicano, COM) fielded a team of 124 athletes, 80 men and 44 women, across 26 sports at the Games. It was the nation's largest delegation sent to the Olympics since 1972, surpassing the previous mark by an increase of 22 athletes.

Football and volleyball, both of which played by men, were the only team-based sports in which Mexico qualified for the Games, with the latter having returned to the Olympic tournament after more than four decades. For individual-based sports, Mexico made its Olympic debut in mountain biking and golf (new to the 2016 Games), as well as its return to men's beach volleyball and tennis after 16 years.

Track and field accounted for the largest number of athletes on the Mexican team, with 20 entries. There was a single competitor each in badminton, sprint canoeing, equestrian dressage, and Greco-Roman wrestling.

Seven of the nation's Olympic medalists from London 2012 returned, including diving tandem Iván García and Germán Sánchez (men's synchronized platform), as well as their female counterparts Paola Espinosa and Alejandra Orozco (women's synchronized platform); archer and three-time Olympian Aída Román, taekwondo fighter María Espinoza, and football team captain Oribe Peralta, who helped the Mexicans score two goals for a shocking gold-medal victory over Brazil in the men's tournament final. Windsurfer David Mier headed the full roster of Mexican athletes by participating in his fifth consecutive Olympics as the most experienced competitor. He was followed by Espinosa and heavyweight judoka Vanessa Zambotti, both of whom vied for their fourth straight Games.

18-year-old springboard diver Melany Hernández was Mexico's youngest competitor, with dressage rider and two-time Olympian Bernadette Pujals rounding out the field as the oldest competitor (aged 48). Mountain biker Daniela Campuzano was selected by COM to lead the Mexican team as the flag bearer in the opening ceremony.

The following is the list of number of competitors participating in the Games. Note that reserves in fencing, field hockey, football, and handball are not counted as athletes:

Sport	Men	Women	Total
Archery	1	3	4
Athletics	12	8	20
Badminton	1	0	1
Boxing	6	0	6
Canoeing	1	0	1
Cycling	2	2	4
Diving	5	4	9
Equestrian	0	1	1
Fencing	2	5	7
Football	18	0	18
Golf	1	2	3
Gymnastics	1	1	2
Judo	0	2	2
Modern pentathlon	1	1	2
Rowing	1	1	2
Sailing	2	1	3
Shooting	0	2	2
Swimming	2	1	3
Synchronized swimming	—	2	2
Table tennis	1	1	2
Taekwondo	2	2	4
Tennis	2	0	2
Triathlon	3	2	5
Volleyball	14	0	14
Weightlifting	1	3	4
Wrestling	1	0	1
Total	80	44	124

== Archery ==
Mexican archers qualified for the women's events after having secured a top eight finish in the team recurve at the 2015 World Archery Championships in Copenhagen, Denmark. Meanwhile, another Mexican archer has been added to the squad by securing one of three available Olympic spots in the men's individual recurve at the Pan American Qualification Tournament in Medellín, Colombia.

Athlete	Event	Ranking round		Round of 64	Round of 32	Round of 16	Quarterfinals	Semifinals	Final / BM	
Athlete	Event	Score	Seed	Opposition Score	Opposition Score	Opposition Score	Opposition Score	Opposition Score	Opposition Score	Rank
Ernesto Boardman	Men's individual	662	28	Puentes (CUB); L 4–6	did not advance					
Gabriela Bayardo	Women's individual	648	12	Ray (BAN); W 6–0	Unruh (GER); L 4–6	did not advance				
Aída Román	Women's individual	623	38	Mîrca (MDA); L 4–6	did not advance					
Alejandra Valencia	Women's individual	651	8	Lobzhenidze (GEO); W 6–4	Anagöz (TUR); W 6–5	Laishram (IND); W 6–2	Choi M-s (KOR); W 6–0	Unruh (GER); L 2–6	Ki B-b (KOR); L 4–6	4
Gabriela Bayardo; Aída Román; Alejandra Valencia	Women's team	1922	5	—N/a		Georgia; W 6–0	Chinese Taipei; L 4–5	did not advance		

== Athletics (track and field) ==
Mexican athletes have so far achieved qualifying standards in the following athletics events (up to a maximum of 3 athletes in each event):

Key

- Note–Ranks given for track events are within the athlete's heat only
- Q = Qualified for the next round
- q = Qualified for the next round as a fastest loser or, in field events, by position without achieving the qualifying target
- NR = National record
- N/A = Round not applicable for the event
- Bye = Athlete not required to compete in round

Track & road events
Men

Athlete	Event	Heat		Semifinal		Final	
Athlete	Event	Result	Rank	Result	Rank	Result	Rank
Jose Carlos Herrera	200 m	20.29	1 Q	20.48	8	did not advance	
Ricardo Ramos	Marathon	—N/a				2:30:20	119
Daniel Vargas	Marathon	—N/a				2:18:51	54
Pedro Daniel Gómez	20 km walk	—N/a				1:22:22	23
Ever Palma	20 km walk	—N/a				1:21:24	14
Julio César Salazar	20 km walk	—N/a				1:27:38	52
Horacio Nava	50 km walk	—N/a				3:50:53	13
José Leyver Ojeda	50 km walk	—N/a				3:56:07	25
Omar Zepeda	50 km walk	—N/a				3:51:35	16

Women

Athlete	Event	Final	
Athlete	Event	Result	Rank
Brenda Flores	10000 m	32:39.08	32
Marisol Romero	10000 m	35:33.03	35
Margarita Hernández	Marathon	2:38:15	48
Madaí Pérez	Marathon	2:34:42	32
María Guadalupe González	20 km walk	1:28:37	2nd place, silver medalist(s)
Alejandra Ortega	20 km walk	1:37:33	41
María Guadalupe Sánchez	20 km walk	1:33:44	23

Field events

Athlete	Event	Qualification		Final	
Athlete	Event	Distance	Position	Distance	Position
Alberto Álvarez	Men's triple jump	16.67	10 q	16.56	9
Edgar Rivera	Men's high jump	2.17	35	did not advance	
Diego del Real	Men's hammer throw	75.19	5 q	76.05	4
Yvonne Treviño	Women's long jump	6.16	30	did not advance	

== Badminton ==
Mexico has qualified one badminton player for the men's singles into the Olympic tournament. Lino Muñoz received a spare Olympic berth freed up by Oceania, as the next highest-ranked shuttler, not yet qualified, in the BWF World Rankings as of 5 May 2016.

Athlete	Event	Group Stage			Elimination	Quarterfinal	Semifinal	Final / BM	
Athlete	Event	Opposition Score	Opposition Score	Rank	Opposition Score	Opposition Score	Opposition Score	Opposition Score	Rank
Lino Muñoz	Men's singles	Kidambi (IND); L (11–21, 17–21)	Hurskainen (SWE); L (12–21, 11–21)	3	did not advance				

== Boxing ==
Mexico has entered five boxers to compete in the following weight classes into the Olympic boxing tournament. Elias Emigdio and Raúl Curiel became the first Mexican boxers to be selected to the Olympic team with a top two finish in the AIBA Pro Boxing rankings, while Misael Rodríguez had claimed his Olympic spot with a semifinal victory at the 2016 American Qualification Tournament in Buenos Aires, Argentina.

Joselito Velázquez, Lindolfo Delgado, and Juan Pablo Romero secured additional places on the Mexican roster at the 2016 APB and WSB Olympic Qualifier in Vargas, Venezuela.

Athlete	Event	Round of 32	Round of 16	Quarterfinals	Semifinals	Final	
Athlete	Event	Opposition Result	Opposition Result	Opposition Result	Opposition Result	Opposition Result	Rank
Joselito Velázquez	Men's light flyweight	Blanc (ARG); W 3–0	Dusmatov (UZB); L 0–3	did not advance			
Elías Emigdio	Men's flyweight	Kharkhüü (MGL); W 3–0	Ávila (COL); L 0–3	did not advance			
Lindolfo Delgado	Men's lightweight	Tommasone (ITA); L 0–3	did not advance				
Raúl Curiel	Men's light welterweight	Hu Qx (CHN); L WO	did not advance				
Juan Pablo Romero	Men's welterweight	Mangiacapre (ITA); L 1–2	did not advance				
Misael Rodríguez	Men's middleweight	Abdul-Ridha (IRQ); W 3–0	O'Reilly (IRL); W DSQ	Abdin (EGY); W 3–0	Melikuziev (UZB); L 0–3	Did not advance	3rd place, bronze medalist(s)

== Canoeing ==
=== Sprint ===
Mexico has qualified a single boat in men's C-1 200 m for the Games at the 2016 Pan American Sprint Qualifier in Gainesville, Georgia, United States, as the quota spot had been passed to the highest finisher not yet qualified.

Athlete	Event	Heats		Semifinals		Final	
Athlete	Event	Time	Rank	Time	Rank	Time	Rank
Marcos Pulido	Men's C-1 200 m	41.910	6 Q	42.283	5 FB	42.098	16

Qualification Legend: FA = Qualify to final (medal); FB = Qualify to final B (non-medal)

== Cycling ==
=== Road ===
Mexico has qualified one rider in the men's Olympic road race by virtue of their individual ranking among the next two best ranked NOCs at the 2015 Pan American Championships. One additional spot was awarded to the Mexican cyclist in the women's road race by virtue of a top 22 national finish in the 2016 UCI World Rankings.

Athlete	Event	Time	Rank
Luis Lemus	Men's road race	did not finish	
Carolina Rodríguez	Women's road race	did not finish	

=== Track ===
Following the completion of the 2016 UCI Track Cycling World Championships, Mexico has entered one rider to compete in the men's omnium at the Olympics by virtue of his final individual UCI Olympic rankings in that event.

Omnium

Athlete	Event	Scratch race		Individual pursuit			Elimination race		Time trial			Flying lap			Points race		Total points	Rank
Athlete	Event	Rank	Points	Time	Rank	Points	Rank	Points	Time	Rank	Points	Time	Rank	Points	Points	Rank	Total points	Rank
Ignacio Prado	Men's omnium	13	16	4:29.396	14	14	9	24	1:05.839	17	8	14.046	17	8	3	10	73	15

=== Mountain biking ===
Mexico has qualified one mountain bike rider in the women's Olympic cross-country race by virtue of her best individual ranking at the 2015 Pan American Championships.

Athlete	Event	Time	Rank
Daniela Campuzano	Women's cross-country	1:36:33	16

== Diving ==
Mexican divers qualified for the following individual spots and synchronized teams at the Olympics through the 2015 FINA World Championships and the 2016 FINA World Cup series.

On March 29, 2016, Mexican Olympic Committee had officially announced the entire diving squad for Rio 2016, including Olympic silver medalists Iván García and Germán Sánchez, as well as two-time Olympians Paola Espinosa and Alejandra Orozco, in the men's and women's synchronized platform, respectively.

Men

Athlete	Event	Preliminaries		Semifinals		Final	
Athlete	Event	Points	Rank	Points	Rank	Points	Rank
Rodrigo Diego López	3 m springboard	430.70	8 Q	356.05	16	did not advance	
Rommel Pacheco	3 m springboard	488.25	2 Q	469.70	2 Q	451.20	7
Iván García	10 m platform	418.90	15 Q	497.55	3	418.95	10
Germán Sánchez	10 m platform	430.05	12 Q	462.05	9	532.70	2nd place, silver medalist(s)
Jahir Ocampo; Rommel Pacheco	3 m synchronized springboard	—N/a				405.30	5
Iván García; Germán Sánchez	10 m synchronized platform	—N/a				423.30	5

Women

Athlete	Event	Preliminaries		Semifinals		Final	
Athlete	Event	Points	Rank	Points	Rank	Points	Rank
Dolores Hernández	3 m springboard	295.20	18 Q	293.05	16	did not advance	
Melany Hernández	3 m springboard	279.45	22	did not advance			
Paola Espinosa	10 m platform	313.70	13 Q	306.45 Q	12	377.10	4
Alejandra Orozco	10 m platform	287.45	20	did not advance			
Paola Espinosa; Alejandra Orozco	10 m synchronized platform	—N/a				304.08	6

== Equestrian ==
Mexico has entered one dressage rider into the Olympic equestrian competition by virtue of a top national finish from Central & South America at the 2015 Pan American Games in Toronto, Canada.

=== Dressage ===
2008 Olympian Bernadette Pujals was officially selected for individual spot on 17 May 2016. She will compete with Rolex, the horse with whom she previously competed at 2011 and 2015 Pan American Games.

Athlete	Horse	Event	Grand Prix		Grand Prix Special		Grand Prix Freestyle		Overall	
Athlete	Horse	Event	Score	Rank	Score	Rank	Technical	Artistic	Score	Rank
Bernadette Pujals	Rolex	Individual	66.757	51	did not advance					

== Fencing ==
Mexican fencers have qualified a full squad in the women's team sabre by virtue of being the highest ranking team from America outside the world's top four in the FIE Olympic Team Rankings. 2012 Olympian Daniel Gómez secured the spot on the Mexican squad in the men's foil by attaining a top two individual placement from America outside the top eight qualified teams in the FIE Adjusted Official Rankings. Meanwhile, Julián Ayala, Alejandra Terán, and Nataly Michel rounded out the Mexican roster by virtue of a top two finish at the Pan American Zonal Qualifier in San José, Costa Rica.

Men

Athlete	Event	Round of 64	Round of 32	Round of 16	Quarterfinal	Semifinal	Final / BM	
Athlete	Event	Opposition Score	Opposition Score	Opposition Score	Opposition Score	Opposition Score	Opposition Score	Rank
Daniel Gómez	Foil	Bye	Avola (ITA); L 5–15	did not advance				
Julián Ayala	Sabre	—N/a	Szilágyi (HUN); L 9–15	did not advance				

Women

Athlete	Event	Round of 64	Round of 32	Round of 16	Quarterfinal	Semifinal	Final / BM	
Athlete	Event	Opposition Score	Opposition Score	Opposition Score	Opposition Score	Opposition Score	Opposition Score	Rank
Alejandra Terán	Épée	Nakano (JPN); L 12–15	did not advance					
Nataly Michel	Foil	Bye	Prescod (USA); L 9–15	did not advance				
Tania Arrayales	Sabre	—N/a	Egorian (RUS); L 7–15	did not advance				
Úrsula González	Sabre	Toledo (MEX); W 15–11	Kharlan (UKR); L 8–15	did not advance				
Julieta Toledo	Sabre	González (MEX); L 11–15	did not advance					
Tania Arrayales; Úrsula González; Paola Pliego; Julieta Toledo	Team sabre	—N/a			Russia; L 31–45	Classification semifinal Poland; L 23–45	7th place final France; W 45–38	7

== Football ==
=== Men's tournament ===
Mexico men's football team qualified for the Olympics by attaining a top two finish at the 2015 CONCACAF Men's Olympic Qualifying Championship in the United States.

Team roster

The following is the Mexico squad in the men's football tournament of the 2016 Summer Olympics. The team of 18 players was officially named on 7 July.

Head coach: Raúl Gutiérrez

No.	Pos.	Player	Date of birth (age)	Caps	Goals	Club
1	GK	Alfredo Talavera*	18 September 1982 (aged 33)	0	0	(Mexican Football Federation) Toluca
2	DF	José Abella	10 February 1994 (aged 22)	9	3	(Mexican Football Federation) Santos Laguna
3	DF	Jordan Silva	30 July 1994 (aged 22)	14	1	(Mexican Football Federation) Toluca
4	DF	César Montes	24 February 1997 (aged 19)	0	0	(Mexican Football Federation) Monterrey
5	MF	Michael Pérez Ortiz	14 February 1993 (aged 23)	3	1	(Mexican Football Federation) Guadalajara
6	DF	Jorge Torres Nilo*	16 January 1988 (aged 28)	0	0	(Mexican Football Federation) UANL
7	MF	Rodolfo Pizarro	15 February 1994 (aged 22)	7	0	(Mexican Football Federation) Pachuca
8	MF	Hirving Lozano	30 July 1995 (aged 21)	5	1	(Mexican Football Federation) Pachuca
9	FW	Oribe Peralta* (c)	12 January 1984 (aged 32)	5	6	(Mexican Football Federation) América
10	MF	Víctor Guzmán	3 February 1995 (aged 21)	16	1	(Mexican Football Federation) Pachuca
11	FW	Marco Bueno	31 March 1994 (aged 22)	13	5	(Mexican Football Federation) Guadalajara
12	GK	Gibrán Lajud	25 December 1993 (aged 22)	20	0	(Mexican Football Federation) Tijuana
13	DF	Carlos Salcedo	29 September 1993 (aged 22)	8	0	(Mexican Football Federation) Guadalajara
14	DF	Érick Aguirre	23 February 1997 (aged 19)	4	0	(Mexican Football Federation) Pachuca
15	MF	Érick Gutiérrez	15 June 1995 (aged 21)	3	0	(Mexican Football Federation) Pachuca
16	FW	Carlos Cisneros	30 August 1993 (aged 22)	7	3	(Mexican Football Federation) Guadalajara
17	MF	Alfonso González	5 September 1994 (aged 21)	8	2	(Mexican Football Federation) Monterrey
18	FW	Erick Torres	19 January 1993 (aged 23)	9	7	(United States Soccer Federation) Houston Dynamo
20	MF	Raúl López	23 February 1993 (aged 23)			(Mexican Football Federation) Pachuca
21	FW	Carlos Fierro	24 July 1994 (aged 22)			(Mexican Football Federation) Querétaro

* Over-aged player.

Group play

Pos	Team	Pld	W	D	L	GF	GA	GD	Pts	Qualification
1	South Korea	3	2	1	0	12	3	+9	7	Quarter-finals
2	Germany	3	1	2	0	15	5	+10	5	Quarter-finals
3	Mexico	3	1	1	1	7	4	+3	4	
4	Fiji	3	0	0	3	1	23	−22	0	

Source: Rio2016 & FIFA
Rules for classification: Tiebreakers
4 August 2016
17:00

Mexico	2–2	Germany
Peralta 52'; Pizarro 60'	Report (Rio2016); Report (FIFA)	Gnabry 58'; Ginter 78'

Itaipava Arena Fonte Nova, Salvador
Attendance: 16,500
Referee: Alireza Faghani (Iran)

7 August 2016
13:00

Fiji	1–5	Mexico
Krishna 10'	Report (Rio2016); Report (FIFA)	Gutiérrez 48', 55', 58', 73'; Salcedo 67'

Itaipava Arena Fonte Nova, Salvador
Attendance: 11,200
Referee: Gehad Grisha (Egypt)

10 August 2016
16:00

South Korea	1–0	Mexico
Kwon Chang-hoon 73'	Report (Rio2016); Report (FIFA)

Estádio Nacional Mané Garrincha, Brasília
Attendance: 19,332
Referee: Clément Turpin (France)

== Golf ==
Mexico has entered three golfers into the Olympic tournament. Rodolfo Cazaubón (world no. 344), Gaby López (world no. 98), and Alejandra Llaneza (world no. 385) qualified directly among the top 60 eligible players for their respective individual events based on the IGF World Rankings as of 11 July 2016.

Athlete	Event	Round 1	Round 2	Round 3	Round 4	Total		
Athlete	Event	Score	Score	Score	Score	Score	Par	Rank
Rodolfo Cazaubón	Men's	76	66	68	73	283	−1	=30
Gaby López	Women's	71	67	76	72	286	+2	=31
Alejandra Llaneza	Women's	73	68	73	80	294	+10	=44

== Gymnastics ==
=== Artistic ===
Mexico has entered two artistic gymnasts into the Olympic competition. These Olympic berths had been awarded each to the Mexican male and female gymnast, who both participated respectively in the apparatus and all-around events at the Olympic Test Event in Rio de Janeiro.

Men

Athlete	Event	Qualification								Final							
Athlete	Event	Apparatus						Total	Rank	Apparatus						Total	Rank
Athlete	Event	F	PH	R	V	PB	HB	Total	Rank	F	PH	R	V	PB	HB	Total	Rank
Daniel Corral	Pommel horse	—N/a	13.833	—N/a				13.833	47	did not advance							
Daniel Corral	Parallel bars	—N/a				15.000	—N/a	15.000	25	did not advance							

Women

Athlete	Event	Qualification						Final					
Athlete	Event	Apparatus				Total	Rank	Apparatus				Total	Rank
Athlete	Event	V	UB	BB	F	Total	Rank	V	UB	BB	F	Total	Rank
Alexa Moreno	All-around	14.633	13.333	13.300	13.833	54.866	31	did not advance					

== Judo ==
Mexico has qualified two judokas for each of the following weight classes at the Games. Going to her fourth Olympics, Vanessa Zambotti was ranked among the top 14 eligible judokas for women in the IJF World Ranking List of May 30, 2016, while Edna Carrillo at women's extra-lightweight (48 kg) earned a continental quota spot from the Pan American region, as the highest-ranked Mexican judoka outside of direct qualifying position.

Athlete	Event	Round of 32	Round of 16	Quarterfinals	Semifinals	Repechage	Final / BM	
Athlete	Event	Opposition Result	Opposition Result	Opposition Result	Opposition Result	Opposition Result	Opposition Result	Rank
Edna Carrillo	Women's −48 kg	Lokmanhekim (TUR); W 100–000	Kondo (JPN); L 000–101	did not advance				
Vanessa Zambotti	Women's +78 kg	Bye	Andéol (FRA); L 000–000 S	did not advance				

== Modern pentathlon ==
Mexican athletes have qualified for the following spots to compete in modern pentathlon. Ismael Hernandéz and Tamara Vega secured a selection each in the men's and women's event respectively after obtaining one of the five Olympic slots from the Pan American Games.

Athlete	Event	Fencing (épée one touch)				Swimming (200 m freestyle)			Riding (show jumping)			Combined: shooting/running (10 m air pistol)/(3200 m)			Total points	Final rank
Athlete	Event	RR	BR	Rank	MP points	Time	Rank	MP points	Time	Rank	MP points	Time	Rank	MP Points	Total points	Final rank
Ismael Hernández	Men's	18–17	0	19	208	2:02.12	11	334	71.78	5	300	11:14:33	8	626	1468	3rd place, bronze medalist(s)
Tamara Vega	Women's	15–20	0	27	190	2:16.89	17	290	72.93	5	300	12:49:39	11	531	1311	11

== Rowing ==
Mexico has qualified one boat each in both the men's and women's single sculls for the Olympics at the 2016 Latin American Continental Qualification Regatta in Valparaíso, Chile.

Athlete	Event	Heats		Repechage		Quarterfinals		Semifinals		Final	
Athlete	Event	Time	Rank	Time	Rank	Time	Rank	Time	Rank	Time	Rank
Juan Carlos Cabrera	Men's single sculls	7:08.27	2 QF	Bye		6:50.04	2 SA/B	7:03.68	4 FB	6:50.02	8
Kenia Lechuga	Women's single sculls	8:11.44	1 QF	Bye		7:44.11	3 SA/B	8:14.76	6 FB	7:40.39	12

Qualification Legend: FA=Final A (medal); FB=Final B (non-medal); FC=Final C (non-medal); FD=Final D (non-medal); FE=Final E (non-medal); FF=Final F (non-medal); SA/B=Semifinals A/B; SC/D=Semifinals C/D; SE/F=Semifinals E/F; QF=Quarterfinals; R=Repechage

== Sailing ==
Mexican sailors have qualified one boat in each of the following classes through the 2014 ISAF Sailing World Championships, the individual fleet Worlds, and North American qualifying regattas.

Athlete	Event	Race													Net points	Final rank
Athlete	Event	1	2	3	4	5	6	7	8	9	10	11	12	M*	Net points	Final rank
David Mier	Men's RS:X	28	21	22	26	21	17	~~32~~	15	5	16	15	21	EL	207	20
Yanic Gentry	Men's Laser	41	42	29	43	34	36	38	~~DNF~~	41	36	—N/a		EL	340	42
Demita Vega	Women's RS:X	11	18	18	9	10	17	~~27~~	8	13	17	11	15	EL	147	13

M = Medal race; EL = Eliminated – did not advance into the medal race

== Shooting ==
Mexican shooters have achieved quota places for the following events by virtue of their best finishes at the 2015 Pan American Games and the 2015 ISSF World Cup series, as long as they obtained a minimum qualifying score (MQS) by March 31, 2016.

Athlete	Event	Qualification		Final	
Athlete	Event	Points	Rank	Points	Rank
Alejandra Zavala	Women's 10 m air pistol	387	4 Q	157.1	4
Goretti Zumaya	Women's 10 m air rifle	413.9	24	did not advance	

Qualification Legend: Q = Qualify for the next round; q = Qualify for the bronze medal (shotgun)

== Swimming ==
Mexican swimmers have so far achieved qualifying standards in the following events (up to a maximum of 2 swimmers in each event at the Olympic Qualifying Time (OQT), and potentially 1 at the Olympic Selection Time (OST)):

Athlete	Event	Heat		Semifinal		Final	
Athlete	Event	Time	Rank	Time	Rank	Time	Rank
Long Yuan Gutiérrez	Men's 100 m butterfly	53.34	32	Did not advance			
Ricardo Vargas	Men's 1500 m freestyle	15:11.53	25	—N/a		Did not advance	
Liliana Ibáñez	Women's 50 m freestyle	25.25	28	Did not advance			

== Synchronized swimming ==
Mexico has fielded a squad of two synchronized swimmers to compete only in the women's duet by virtue of their sixth-place finish at the FINA Olympic test event in Rio de Janeiro.

Athlete	Event	Technical routine		Free routine (preliminary)			Free routine (final)		
Athlete	Event	Points	Rank	Points	Total (technical + free)	Rank	Points	Total (technical + free)	Rank
Karem Achach; Nuria Diosdado	Duet	84.9268	12	85.7333	170.6601	11 Q	86.0667	170.9935	11

== Table tennis ==
Mexico has entered two athletes into the table tennis competition at the Games. Marcos Madrid and three-time Olympian Yadira Silva secured their Olympic spots in the men's and women's singles, respectively, by virtue of their top six finish at the 2016 Latin American Qualification Tournament in Santiago, Chile.

Athlete	Event	Preliminary	Round 1	Round 2	Round 3	Round of 16	Quarterfinals	Semifinals	Final / BM	
Athlete	Event	Opposition Result	Opposition Result	Opposition Result	Opposition Result	Opposition Result	Opposition Result	Opposition Result	Opposition Result	Rank
Marcos Madrid	Men's singles	Shing (VAN); W 4–0	Wang Y (SVK); L 1–4	did not advance						
Yadira Silva	Women's singles	Allejji (SYR); W 4–0	Balážová (SVK); L 0–4	did not advance						

== Taekwondo ==
Mexico entered four athletes into the taekwondo competition at the Olympics. 2008 Olympic heavyweight champion María Espinoza, Itzel Manjarrez, 2015 Worlds bronze medalist Saúl Gutiérrez, and Carlos Navarro qualified automatically for their respective weight classes by finishing in the top 6 WTF Olympic rankings.

Athlete	Event	Round of 16	Quarterfinals	Semifinals	Repechage	Final / BM	
Athlete	Event	Opposition Result	Opposition Result	Opposition Result	Opposition Result	Opposition Result	Rank
Carlos Navarro	Men's −58 kg	Shriha (LBA); W 23–9 PTG	Teixeira (BRA); W 8–5	Zhao S (CHN); L 4–9	Bye	Kim T-h (KOR); L 5–7	5
Saúl Gutiérrez	Men's −68 kg	Pürevjav (MGL); L 11–12	did not advance				
Itzel Manjarrez	Women's −49 kg	Keleku (COD); W 9–5	Sing (BRA); W 14–4	Bogdanović (SRB); L 0–10	Bye	Wongpattanakit (THA); L 3–15 PTG	5
María Espinoza	Women's +67 kg	Alora (PHI); W 4–1	Dislam (MAR); W 3–2 SUD	Galloway (USA); W 0–0 SUP	Bye	Zheng Sy (CHN); L 1–5	2nd place, silver medalist(s)

== Tennis ==
Mexico has entered two tennis players into the Olympic tournament. Due to the withdrawal of several tennis players from the Games, Santiago González and Miguel Ángel Reyes-Varela received a spare ITF Olympic place to compete in the men's doubles.

Athlete	Event	Round of 32	Round of 16	Quarterfinals	Semifinals	Final / BM	
Athlete	Event	Opposition Result	Opposition Result	Opposition Result	Opposition Result	Opposition Result	Rank
Santiago González; Miguel Ángel Reyes-Varela	Men's doubles	Fleming / Inglot (GBR); W 6–3, 6–0	Mergea / Tecău (ROU); L 3–6, 6–7^{(9–11)}	did not advance			

== Triathlon ==
Mexico has qualified four triathletes for the following events at the Olympics. London 2012 Olympian Crisanto Grajales secured the men's triathlon spot with a gold medal triumph at the 2015 Pan American Games. Meanwhile, Rodrigo González, Irving Pérez, Claudia Rivas, and Cecilia Pérez were selected among the top 40 eligible athletes each in the men's and women's triathlon based on the ITU Olympic Qualification List as of May 15, 2016.

Athlete	Event	Swim (1.5 km)	Trans 1	Bike (40 km)	Trans 2	Run (10 km)	Total Time	Rank
Rodrigo González	Men's	18:38	0:49	Lapped				
Crisanto Grajales	Men's	17:59	0:50	55:52	0:34	32:13	1:47:28	12
Irving Pérez	Men's	17:35	0:45	56:21	0:35	33:10	1:48:26	22
Cecilia Pérez	Women's	19:10	0:55	1:04:39	0:37	37:26	2:02:47	33
Claudia Rivas	Women's	19:05	0:58	1:01:27	0:40	36:18	1:58:28	9

== Volleyball ==
=== Beach ===
Mexico men's beach volleyball team qualified directly for the Olympics by virtue of their nation's top 15 placement in the FIVB Olympic Rankings as of June 13, 2016. The place was awarded to the rookie duo Juan Virgen and Lombardo Ontiveros.

Athlete	Event	Preliminary round	Standing	Round of 16	Quarterfinals	Semifinals	Final / BM	
Athlete	Event	Opposition Score	Standing	Opposition Score	Opposition Score	Opposition Score	Opposition Score	Rank
Lombardo Ontiveros; Juan Virgen	Men's	Pool C Lupo – Nicolai (ITA); W 2 –1 (14–21, 21–14, 15–11); Dalhausser – Lucena (USA); L 0 –2 (14–21, 17–21); Naceur – Salah (TUN); W 2 – 0 (21–10, 21–10)	2 Q	Nummerdor – Varenhorst (NED); L 0 – 2 (18–21, 15–21)	did not advance			

=== Indoor ===
==== Men's tournament ====
Mexico men's volleyball team qualified for the Olympics by scoring a first-place triumph and securing a lone outright berth at the final meet of the World Olympic Qualifying Tournament in Mexico City, signifying the nation's return to the sport for the first time since it hosted the 1968 Summer Olympics.

Team roster

The following is the Mexico roster in the men's volleyball tournament of the 2016 Summer Olympics.

Head coach: Jorge Azair

No.	Name	Date of birth	Height	Weight	Spike	Block	2015–16 club
1	Daniel Vargas	1 September 1986	1.97 m (6 ft 6 in)	94 kg (207 lb)	340 cm (130 in)	330 cm (130 in)	(Finland) Raision Loimu
4	Gonzalo Ruiz	24 April 1988	1.86 m (6 ft 1 in)	87 kg (192 lb)	345 cm (136 in)	325 cm (128 in)	(Mexico) IMSS ATN
5	Jesús Rangel (L)	20 September 1980	1.90 m (6 ft 3 in)	82 kg (181 lb)	337 cm (133 in)	330 cm (130 in)	(Mexico) Tigres UANL
6	Jesús Alberto Perales	22 December 1993	1.97 m (6 ft 6 in)	88 kg (194 lb)	328 cm (129 in)	304 cm (120 in)	(Mexico) Tigres UANL
7	Jorge Quiñones	13 November 1981	1.86 m (6 ft 1 in)	80 kg (180 lb)	330 cm (130 in)	325 cm (128 in)	(Mexico) Virtus Guanajuato
9	Carlos Guerra (c)	3 August 1981	1.96 m (6 ft 5 in)	95 kg (209 lb)	348 cm (137 in)	335 cm (132 in)	(Switzerland) Chênois Genève
10	Pedro Rangel	16 September 1988	1.92 m (6 ft 4 in)	85 kg (187 lb)	340 cm (130 in)	324 cm (128 in)	(Mexico) Tigres UANL
11	Jorge Barajas	7 May 1991	1.88 m (6 ft 2 in)	80 kg (180 lb)	320 cm (130 in)	317 cm (125 in)	(Mexico) Cocoteros de Colima
13	Samuel Córdova	13 March 1989	2.00 m (6 ft 7 in)	89 kg (196 lb)	353 cm (139 in)	335 cm (132 in)	(Mexico) Baja California
14	Tomás Aguilera	15 November 1988	2.02 m (6 ft 8 in)	95 kg (209 lb)	350 cm (140 in)	340 cm (130 in)	(Mexico) Chihuahua
17	Néstor Orellana	7 January 1992	1.92 m (6 ft 4 in)	84 kg (185 lb)	332 cm (131 in)	327 cm (129 in)	(Mexico) Tigres UANL
21	José Martínez	23 January 1993	2.00 m (6 ft 7 in)	100 kg (220 lb)	345 cm (136 in)	334 cm (131 in)	(Mexico) Virtus Guanajuato

Group play

Pos	Team	Pld	W	L	Pts	SW	SL	SR	SPW	SPL	SPR	Qualification
1	Italy	5	4	1	12	13	5	2.600	432	375	1.152	Quarterfinals
2	Canada	5	3	2	9	10	7	1.429	378	378	1.000	Quarterfinals
3	United States	5	3	2	9	10	8	1.250	419	405	1.035	Quarterfinals
4	Brazil (H)	5	3	2	9	11	9	1.222	467	442	1.057	Quarterfinals
5	France	5	2	3	6	8	9	0.889	386	367	1.052	
6	Mexico	5	0	5	0	1	15	0.067	283	398	0.711	

Source: FIVB
Rules for classification: Tiebreakers
(H) Host

7 August 2016; 11:35	Brazil	3–1	Mexico	Ginásio do Maracanãzinho, Rio de Janeiro; Attendance: 8,686; Referees: Nasr Shaaban (EGY), Arturo Di Giacomo (BEL)
7 August 2016; 11:35	(23–25, 25–19, 25–14, 25–18); Results Statistics			Ginásio do Maracanãzinho, Rio de Janeiro; Attendance: 8,686; Referees: Nasr Shaaban (EGY), Arturo Di Giacomo (BEL)

9 August 2016; 11:55	France	3–0	Mexico	Ginásio do Maracanãzinho, Rio de Janeiro; Attendance: 6,625; Referees: Liu Jiang (CHN), Taoufik Boudaya (TUN)
9 August 2016; 11:55	(25–18, 25–12, 25–22); Results Statistics			Ginásio do Maracanãzinho, Rio de Janeiro; Attendance: 6,625; Referees: Liu Jiang (CHN), Taoufik Boudaya (TUN)

11 August 2016; 20:30	Italy	3–0	Mexico	Ginásio do Maracanãzinho, Rio de Janeiro; Attendance: 5,472; Referees: Arturo Di Giacomo (BEL), Piotr Dudek (POL)
11 August 2016; 20:30	(25–17, 25–13, 25–17); Results Statistics			Ginásio do Maracanãzinho, Rio de Janeiro; Attendance: 5,472; Referees: Arturo Di Giacomo (BEL), Piotr Dudek (POL)

13 August 2016; 20:30	Canada	3–0	Mexico	Ginásio do Maracanãzinho, Rio de Janeiro; Attendance: 5,624; Referees: Hernán Casamiquela (ARG), Taoufik Boudaya (TUN)
13 August 2016; 20:30	(25–20, 25–13, 25–22); Results Statistics			Ginásio do Maracanãzinho, Rio de Janeiro; Attendance: 5,624; Referees: Hernán Casamiquela (ARG), Taoufik Boudaya (TUN)

15 August 2016; 11:35	United States	3–0	Mexico	Ginásio do Maracanãzinho, Rio de Janeiro; Attendance: 7,963; Referees: Mohammad Shahmiri (IRI), Piotr Dudek (POL)
15 August 2016; 11:35	(25–23, 25–11, 25–19); Results Statistics			Ginásio do Maracanãzinho, Rio de Janeiro; Attendance: 7,963; Referees: Mohammad Shahmiri (IRI), Piotr Dudek (POL)

== Weightlifting ==
Mexican weightlifters have qualified three women's quota places for the Rio Olympics based on their combined team standing by points at the 2014 and 2015 IWF World Championships. A single men's Olympic spot had been added to the Mexican roster by virtue of a top seven national finish at the 2016 Pan American Championships.

Athlete	Event	Snatch		Clean & Jerk		Total	Rank
Athlete	Event	Result	Rank	Result	Rank	Total	Rank
Bredni Roque	Men's −69 kg	145	7	181	5	326	4
Patricia Domínguez	Women's −58 kg	96	6	115	8	211	8
Eva Gurrola	Women's −63 kg	100	6	120	6	220	5
Alejandra Garza	Women's −75 kg	98	10	126	9	224	9

== Wrestling ==
Mexico has qualified one wrestler for the men's Greco-Roman 85 kg into the Olympic competition, as a result of his semifinal triumph at the 2016 Pan American Qualification Tournament.

Key:

- VT – Victory by Fall.
- PP – Decision by Points – the loser with technical points.
- PO – Decision by Points – the loser without technical points.
- ST – Decision by points – the loser without technical points and a margin of victory of at least 8 (Greco-Roman) or 10 (freestyle) points.

Men's Greco-Roman

Athlete	Event	Qualification	Round of 16	Quarterfinal	Semifinal	Repechage 1	Repechage 2	Final / BM	
Athlete	Event	Opposition Result	Opposition Result	Opposition Result	Opposition Result	Opposition Result	Opposition Result	Opposition Result	Rank
Alfonso Leyva	−85 kg	Kobliashvili (GEO); L 0–3 ^{PO}	did not advance						19

== See also ==
- Mexico at the 2015 Pan American Games
- Mexico at the 2016 Winter Youth Olympics
