= Malaysia at the 2016 Summer Olympics =

- IOC code: MAS
- NOC: Olympic Council of Malaysia
- Website: www.olympic.org.my (in English)

in Rio de Janeiro
- Competitors: 32 in 10 sports
- Flag bearer: Lee Chong Wei
- Medals Ranked 60th: Gold 0 Silver 4 Bronze 1 Total 5

Summer Olympics appearances (overview)
- 1956; 1960; 1964; 1968; 1972; 1976; 1980; 1984; 1988; 1992; 1996; 2000; 2004; 2008; 2012; 2016; 2020; 2024; 2028

Other related appearances
- North Borneo (1956)

Malaysia competed at the 2016 Summer Olympics in Rio de Janeiro, Brazil, from 5 to 21 August 2016. This was the nation's fifteenth appearance at the Olympics, although it had previously competed in two other editions under the name Malaya. Tan Sri Mohamed Al-Amin Abdul Majid was the chef de mission of the national delegation at the Games.

The Olympic Council of Malaysia fielded a team of 32 athletes, 17 men and 15 women, across ten sports at the Games, matching its largest team ever from Beijing eight years earlier. Among the sports represented by the nation's athletes, Malaysia made its Olympic debut in golf (new to the 2016 Games), as well as its return to weightlifting after an eight-year absence. Badminton had the largest team by sport with eight athletes, a quarter of the nation's full roster.

The Malaysian team featured two Olympic medalists from London, including platform diver Pandelela Rinong, who became the first female from her country to stand on the podium, and badminton superstar Lee Chong Wei, who sought redemption for the nation's first ever gold after losing two previous finals to China's Lin Dan in the men's singles. Appearing in his fourth Olympics as the most experienced athlete, Lee was selected to lead his contingent as the flag bearer in the opening ceremony. Apart from the medalists, eleven Malaysian athletes previously competed in London, including track cyclist Azizulhasni Awang, and badminton tandem Chan Peng Soon and Goh Liu Ying.

Malaysia left Rio de Janeiro with a total of five medals (four silver and one bronze), signifying its most successful outcome in Olympic history and doubling the previous highest medal tallies set at Atlanta 1996 and London 2012. Among the nation's medalists were Awang, who became the first track cyclist from Southeast Asia to stand on the Olympic podium, and Pandelela, who upgraded her individual bronze from London to share a silver with her partner Cheong Jun Hoong in the synchronised platform diving. Badminton superstar Lee managed to claim a silver for the third consecutive time in the men's singles, adding it to those won by Goh V Shem and Tan Wee Kiong in the men's doubles, and Chan and Goh in the mixed doubles.

== Medalists ==
Medal	Name	Sport	Event	Date
Silver	Cheong Jun Hoong; Pandelela Rinong	Diving	Women's synchronised 10 m platform	9 August
Silver	Chan Peng Soon; Goh Liu Ying	Badminton	Mixed doubles	17 August
Silver	Goh V Shem; Tan Wee Kiong	Badminton	Men's doubles	19 August
Silver	Lee Chong Wei	Badminton	Men's singles	20 August
Bronze	Azizulhasni Awang	Cycling	Men's keirin	16 August

Medals by sport
Sport	1st place, gold medalist(s)	2nd place, silver medalist(s)	3rd place, bronze medalist(s)	Total
Badminton	0	3	0	3
Diving	0	1	0	1
Cycling	0	0	1	1
Total	0	4	1	5

== Archery ==
Three Malaysian archers qualified for the men's events by virtue of the nation's podium finish in the team recurve competition at the 2016 Archery World Cup meet in Antalya, Turkey.

Athlete	Event	Ranking round		Round of 64	Round of 32	Round of 16	Quarterfinals	Semifinals	Final / BM	
Athlete	Event	Score	Seed	Opposition Score	Opposition Score	Opposition Score	Opposition Score	Opposition Score	Opposition Score	Rank
Haziq Kamaruddin	Men's individual	645	50	Garrett (USA); L 0–6	did not advance					
Khairul Anuar Mohamad	Men's individual	665	22	Pila (COL); W 6–0	Floto (GER); L 4–6	did not advance				
Mohd Akmal Nor Hasrin	Men's individual	635	55	Rodríguez (ESP); L 0–6	did not advance					
Haziq Kamaruddin; Khairul Anuar Mohamad; Mohd Akmal Nor Hasrin	Men's team	1945	12	—N/a		France; L 2–6	did not advance			

== Athletics ==
Malaysian athletes have achieved qualifying standards in the following event (up to a maximum of 3 athletes in each event):

Key

- Note–Ranks given for track events are within the athlete's heat only
- Q = Qualified for the next round
- q = Qualified for the next round as a fastest loser or, in field events, by position without achieving the qualifying target
- NR = National record
- N/A = Round not applicable for the event
- Bye = Athlete not required to compete in round

Track & road events

Athlete	Event	Heat		Quarterfinal		Semifinal		Final	
Athlete	Event	Time	Rank	Time	Rank	Time	Rank	Time	Rank
Zaidatul Husniah Zulkifli	Women's 100 m	12.12	3 q	12.62	8	did not advance			

Field events

Athlete	Event	Qualification		Final	
Athlete	Event	Distance	Position	Distance	Position
Nauraj Singh Randhawa	Men's high jump	2.26	18	did not advance	

== Badminton ==
Malaysia has qualified a total of eight badminton players for each of the following events into the Olympic tournament based on the BWF World Rankings as of 5 May 2016: one entry each in the men's and women's singles, as well as the pair each in the men's, women's, and mixed doubles.

Men

Athlete	Event	Group Stage				Elimination	Quarterfinal	Semifinal	Final / BM	
Athlete	Event	Opposition Score	Opposition Score	Opposition Score	Rank	Opposition Score	Opposition Score	Opposition Score	Opposition Score	Rank
Lee Chong Wei	Singles	Opti (SUR); W (21–2, 21–3)	Wong (SIN); W (21–18, 21–8)	—N/a	1 Q	Bye	Chou T-c (TPE); W (21–9, 21–15)	Lin D (CHN); W (15–21, 21–11, 22–20)	Chen L (CHN); L (18–21, 18–21)	2nd place, silver medalist(s)
Goh V Shem; Tan Wee Kiong	Doubles	Fuchs / Schöttler (GER); W (21–14, 21–17)	Chew / Pongnairat (USA); W (21–12, 21–10)	Fu HF / Zhang N (CHN); W (16-21, 21–15, 21–18)	1 Q	—N/a	Lee Y-d / Yoo Y-s (KOR); W (17–21, 21–18, 21–19)	Chai B / Hong W (CHN); W (21–18, 12–21, 21–17)	Fu HF / Zhang N (CHN); L (21–16, 11–21, 21–23)	2nd place, silver medalist(s)

Women

Athlete	Event	Group Stage				Elimination	Quarterfinal	Semifinal	Final / BM	
Athlete	Event	Opposition Score	Opposition Score	Opposition Score	Rank	Opposition Score	Opposition Score	Opposition Score	Opposition Score	Rank
Tee Jing Yi	Singles	Gavnholt (CZE); W (22-20, 21–15)	Yamaguchi (JPN); L (18–21, 5–21)	—N/a	2	did not advance				
Vivian Hoo; Woon Khe Wei	Doubles	Olver / Smith (GBR); W (21–17, 24–22)	Poon L Y / Tse Y S (HKG); W (21–15, 21–13)	Maheswari / Polii (INA); L (19–21, 19–21)	2 Q	—N/a	Matsutomo / Takahashi (JPN); L (16–21, 21–18, 9–21)	did not advance		

Mixed

Athlete	Event	Group Stage				Quarterfinal	Semifinal	Final / BM	
Athlete	Event	Opposition Score	Opposition Score	Opposition Score	Rank	Opposition Score	Opposition Score	Opposition Score	Rank
Chan Peng Soon; Goh Liu Ying	Doubles	Isara / Amitrapai (THA); W (21–13, 21–19)	Middleton / Choo (AUS); W (21–17, 21–15)	Ahmad / Natsir (INA); L (15–21, 11–21)	2 Q	Mateusiak / Zięba (POL); W (21–17, 21–10)	Xu C / Ma J (CHN); W (21–12, 21–19)	Ahmad / Natsir (INA); L (14–21, 12–21)	2nd place, silver medalist(s)

== Cycling ==
=== Track ===
Following the completion of the 2016 UCI Track Cycling World Championships, Malaysia has entered two riders to compete only in the men's keirin and women's sprint, respectively, at the Olympics, by virtue of their final individual UCI Olympic rankings in those events.

Sprint

Athlete	Event	Qualification		Round 1	Repechage 1	Round 2	Repechage 2	Quarterfinals	Semifinals	Final	
Athlete	Event	Time Speed (km/h)	Rank	Opposition Time Speed (km/h)	Opposition Time Speed (km/h)	Opposition Time Speed (km/h)	Opposition Time Speed (km/h)	Opposition Time Speed (km/h)	Opposition Time Speed (km/h)	Opposition Time Speed (km/h)	Rank
Fatehah Mustapa	Women's sprint	11.207; 64.245	21	did not advance							

Keirin

Athlete	Event	1st Round	Repechage	2nd Round	Final
Athlete	Event	Rank	Rank	Rank	Rank
Azizulhasni Awang	Men's keirin	5 R	1 Q	3 Q	3rd place, bronze medalist(s)

== Diving ==
Malaysian divers qualified for the following individual spots and synchronised teams at the Olympics through the 2015 FINA World Championships and the 2016 FINA World Cup series. Two more divers have been selected through the 2015 Asian Diving Cup. The Malaysian team was announced on 29 June 2016.

Men

Athlete	Event	Preliminaries		Semifinals		Final	
Athlete	Event	Points	Rank	Points	Rank	Points	Rank
Ahmad Amsyar Azman	3 m springboard	341.70	29	did not advance			
Ooi Tze Liang	10 m platform	379.50	22	did not advance			

Women

Athlete	Event	Preliminaries		Semifinals		Final	
Athlete	Event	Points	Rank	Points	Rank	Points	Rank
Cheong Jun Hoong	3 m springboard	282.25	21	did not advance			
Ng Yan Yee	3 m springboard	299.05	17 Q	324.75	5 Q	306.60	10
Pandelela Rinong	10 m platform	332.45	6 Q	336.95	6 Q	330.45	11
Nur Dhabitah Sabri	10 m platform	325.85	8 Q	307.65	11 Q	338.00	9
Cheong Jun Hoong; Nur Dhabitah Sabri	3 m synchronised springboard	—N/a				293.40	5
Cheong Jun Hoong; Pandelela Rinong	10 m synchronised platform	—N/a				344.34	2nd place, silver medalist(s)

== Golf ==
Malaysia has entered four golfers (two per gender) into the Olympic tournament. Danny Chia (world no. 230), Gavin Green (world no. 321), Kelly Tan (world no. 153) and Michelle Koh (world no. 443) qualified directly among the top 60 eligible players for their respective individual events based on the IGF World Rankings as of 11 July 2016.

Athlete	Event	Round 1	Round 2	Round 3	Round 4	Total		
Athlete	Event	Score	Score	Score	Score	Score	Par	Rank
Danny Chia	Men's	73	70	70	71	288	+4	48
Gavin Green	Men's	73	74	72	68	287	+3	47
Michelle Koh	Women's	79	71	76	82	308	+24	58
Kelly Tan	Women's	78	70	76	73	297	+13	51

== Sailing ==
Malaysian sailors have qualified one boat in each of the following classes through the individual fleet World Championships, and the Asian Sailing Championships.

Athlete	Event	Race											Net points	Final rank
Athlete	Event	1	2	3	4	5	6	7	8	9	10	M*	Net points	Final rank
Khairulnizam Afendy	Men's Laser	38	33	40	33	20	21	~~DNF~~	37	31	28	EL	281	35
Nur Shazrin Mohd Latif	Women's Laser Radial	26	33	34	30	33	~~35~~	31	26	29	33	EL	274	33

M = Medal race; EL = Eliminated – did not advance into the medal race

== Shooting ==
Malaysia has qualified one shooter in the men's pistol events by virtue of his best finish at the 2015 ISSF World Cup series and Asian Championships, as long as he obtained a minimum qualifying score (MQS) by 31 March 2016.

Athlete	Event	Qualification		Final	
Athlete	Event	Points	Rank	Points	Rank
Johnathan Wong	Men's 10 m air pistol	574	28	did not advance	
Johnathan Wong	Men's 50 m pistol	535	37	did not advance	

Qualification Legend: Q = Qualify for the next round; q = Qualify for the bronze medal (shotgun)

== Swimming ==
Malaysian swimmers have so far achieved qualifying standards in the following events (up to a maximum of 2 swimmers in each event at the Olympic Qualifying Time (OQT), and potentially 1 at the Olympic Selection Time (OST)):

Athlete	Event	Heat		Semifinal		Final	
Athlete	Event	Time	Rank	Time	Rank	Time	Rank
Welson Sim	Men's 200 m freestyle	1:47.67	26	did not advance			
Welson Sim	Men's 400 m freestyle	3:51:57	34	—N/a		did not advance	
Welson Sim	Men's 1500 m freestyle	15:32.63	39	—N/a		did not advance	
Heidi Gan	Women's 10 km open water	—N/a				1:59:07.9	21
Phee Jinq En	Women's 100 m breaststroke	1:10.22	33	did not advance			

== Weightlifting ==
Malaysia has qualified one male weightlifter for the Rio Olympics by virtue of a top seven national finish at the 2016 Asian Championships, signifying the nation's Olympic return to the sport after an eight-year hiatus. The team must allocate this place by 20 June 2016.

Athlete	Event	Snatch		Clean & Jerk		Total	Rank
Athlete	Event	Result	Rank	Result	Rank	Total	Rank
Mohd Hafifi Mansor	Men's −69 kg	140	12	176	10	316	12

== See also ==
- Malaysia at the 2016 Summer Paralympics
