= Badminton at the 2016 Summer Olympics – Mixed doubles =

Mixed doubles at the Games of the XXXI Olympiad
- Venue: Riocentro - Pavilion 4
- Date: 11–17 August
- Competitors: 32 from 14 nations

Medalists
1st place, gold medalist(s)		Tontowi Ahmad; Liliyana Natsir	Indonesia
2nd place, silver medalist(s)		Chan Peng Soon; Goh Liu Ying	Malaysia
3rd place, bronze medalist(s)		Zhang Nan; Zhao Yunlei	China

The badminton mixed doubles tournament at the 2016 Summer Olympics took place from 11 to 17 August at Riocentro - Pavilion 4. The seeding was decided on 21 July 2016.

Indonesia's Tontowi Ahmad and Liliyana Natsir defeated Malaysia's Chan Peng Soon and Goh Liu Ying in the final, 21–14, 21–12 to win the gold medal in mixed doubles badminton at the 2016 Summer Olympics. The pair won Indonesia's seventh Olympic medal in badminton, and became the second pair from Indonesia to win a gold medal in Olympic badminton after Markis Kido and Hendra Setiawan achieved the feat in 2008. In the bronze-medal match, China's Zhang Nan and Zhao Yunlei defeated compatriots Xu Chen and Ma Jin 21–7, 21–11.

== Competition format ==
The tournament started with a group phase round-robin followed by a knockout stage.

== Seeds ==
A total of 4 pairs were given seeds.

1. Zhang Nan / Zhao Yunlei (CHN) (bronze medalists)
2. Ko Sung-hyun / Kim Ha-na (KOR) (quarter-finals)
3. Tontowi Ahmad / Liliyana Natsir (INA) (gold medalists)
4. Joachim Fischer Nielsen / Christinna Pedersen (DEN) (group stage)

== Results ==
=== Group stage ===
==== Group A ====
Team	Pld	W	L	SW	SL	Pts
Zhang Nan / Zhao Yunlei (CHN)	3	3	0	6	0	3
Praveen Jordan / Debby Susanto (INA)	3	2	1	4	3	2
Lee Chun Hei / Chau Hoi Wah (HKG)	3	1	2	3	4	1
Michael Fuchs / Birgit Michels (GER)	3	0	3	0	6	0

Team 1	Score	Team 2
11 August, 8:00
Zhang N / Zhao YL (CHN)	21–19; 21–16	M Fuchs / B Michels (GER)
11 August, 10:45
P Jordan / D Susanto (INA)	21–12; 19–21; 21–15	Lee C H / Chau H W (HKG)
12 August, 8:00
Zhang N / Zhao YL (CHN)	21–16; 21–15	Lee C H / Chau H W (HKG)
12 August, 9:35
P Jordan / D Susanto (INA)	21–16; 21–15	M Fuchs / B Michels (GER)
13 August, 16:40
Zhang N / Zhao YL (CHN)	21–11; 21–18	P Jordan / D Susanto (INA)
13 August, 16:40
Lee C H / Chau H W (HKG)	21–17; 21–14	M Fuchs / B Michels (GER)

==== Group B ====
Team	Pld	W	L	SW	SL	Pts
Robert Mateusiak / Nadieżda Zięba (POL)	3	2	1	4	4	2
Xu Chen / Ma Jin (CHN)	3	2	1	5	4	2
Chris Adcock / Gabby Adcock (GBR)	3	1	2	4	5	1
Joachim Fischer Nielsen / Christinna Pedersen (DEN)	3	1	2	4	4	1

Team 1	Score	Team 2
11 August, 16:40
Xu C / Ma J (CHN)	13–21; 22–20; 21–15	C Adcock / G Adcock (GBR)
11 August, 16:40
J F Nielsen / C Pedersen (DEN)	21–18; 23–21	R Mateusiak / N Zięba (POL)
12 August, 8:25
Xu C / Ma J (CHN)	21–13; 9–21; 19–21	R Mateusiak / N Zięba (POL)
12 August, 9:35
J F Nielsen / C Pedersen (DEN)	19–21; 24–22; 17–21	C Adcock / G Adcock (GBR)
13 August, 8:25
J F Nielsen / C Pedersen (DEN)	24–22; 14–21; 16–21	Xu C / Ma J (CHN)
13 August, 10:45
C Adcock / G Adcock (GBR)	21–18; 25–27; 9–21	R Mateusiak / N Zięba (POL)

==== Group C ====
Team	Pld	W	L	SW	SL	Pts
Tontowi Ahmad / Liliyana Natsir (INA)	3	3	0	6	0	3
Chan Peng Soon / Goh Liu Ying (MAS)	3	2	1	4	2	2
Bodin Isara / Savitree Amitrapai (THA)	3	1	2	2	4	1
Robin Middleton / Leanne Choo (AUS)	3	0	3	0	6	0

Team 1	Score	Team 2
11 August, 15:30
T Ahmad / L Natsir (INA)	21–7; 21–8	R Middleton / L Choo (AUS)
11 August, 16:40
Chan P S / Goh L Y (MAS)	21–13; 21–19	B Isara / S Amitrapai (THA)
12 August, 11:55
T Ahmad / L Natsir (INA)	21–11; 21–13	B Isara / S Amitrapai (THA)
12 August, 15:55
Chan P S / Goh L Y (MAS)	21–17; 21–15	R Middleton / L Choo (AUS)
13 August, 10:10
T Ahmad / L Natsir (INA)	21–15; 21–11	Chan P S / Goh L Y (MAS)
13 August, 21:05
B Isara / S Amitrapai (THA)	21–13; 21–18	R Middleton / L Choo (AUS)

==== Group D ====
Team	Pld	W	L	SW	SL	Pts
Ko Sung-hyun / Kim Ha-na (KOR)	3	3	0	6	0	3
Kenta Kazuno / Ayane Kurihara (JPN)	3	2	1	4	2	2
Jacco Arends / Selena Piek (NED)	3	1	2	2	4	1
Phillip Chew / Jamie Subandhi (USA)	3	0	3	0	6	0

Team 1	Score	Team 2
11 August, 9:00
K Kazuno / A Kurihara (JPN)	21–14; 21–19	J Arends / S Piek (NED)
11 August, 9:35
Ko S-h / Kim H-n (KOR)	21–10; 21–12	P Chew / J Subandhi (USA)
12 August, 15:30
K Kazuno / A Kurihara (JPN)	21–6; 21–12	P Chew / J Subandhi (USA)
12 August, 16:40
Ko S-h / Kim H-n (KOR)	21–10; 21–10	J Arends / S Piek (NED)
13 August, 9:00
Ko S-h / Kim H-n (KOR)	25–23; 21–17	K Kazuno / A Kurihara (JPN)
13 August, 15:55
J Arends / S Piek (NED)	21–15; 21–19	P Chew / J Subandhi (USA)

=== Finals ===
Quarter-finals
A1	Zhang Nan (CHN); Zhao Yunlei (CHN)	21	21
D2	Kenta Kazuno (JPN); Ayane Kurihara (JPN)	14	12
C1	Tontowi Ahmad (INA); Liliyana Natsir (INA)	21	21
A2	Praveen Jordan (INA); Debby Susanto (INA)	16	11
C2	Chan Peng Soon (MAS); Goh Liu Ying (MAS)	21	21
B1	Robert Mateusiak (POL); Nadieżda Zięba (POL)	17	10
B2	Xu Chen (CHN); Ma Jin (CHN)	21	21
D1	Ko Sung-hyun (KOR); Kim Ha-na (KOR)	17	18

Semi-finals
A1	Zhang Nan (CHN); Zhao Yunlei (CHN)	16	15
C1	Tontowi Ahmad (INA); Liliyana Natsir (INA)	21	21
C2	Chan Peng Soon (MAS); Goh Liu Ying (MAS)	21	21
B2	Xu Chen (CHN); Ma Jin (CHN)	12	19

Final
C1	Tontowi Ahmad (INA); Liliyana Natsir (INA)	21	21
C2	Chan Peng Soon (MAS); Goh Liu Ying (MAS)	14	12
Bronze medal match
A1	Zhang Nan (CHN); Zhao Yunlei (CHN)	21	21
B2	Xu Chen (CHN); Ma Jin (CHN)	7	11
