= Ian Matos =

Brazilian diver (1989–2021)

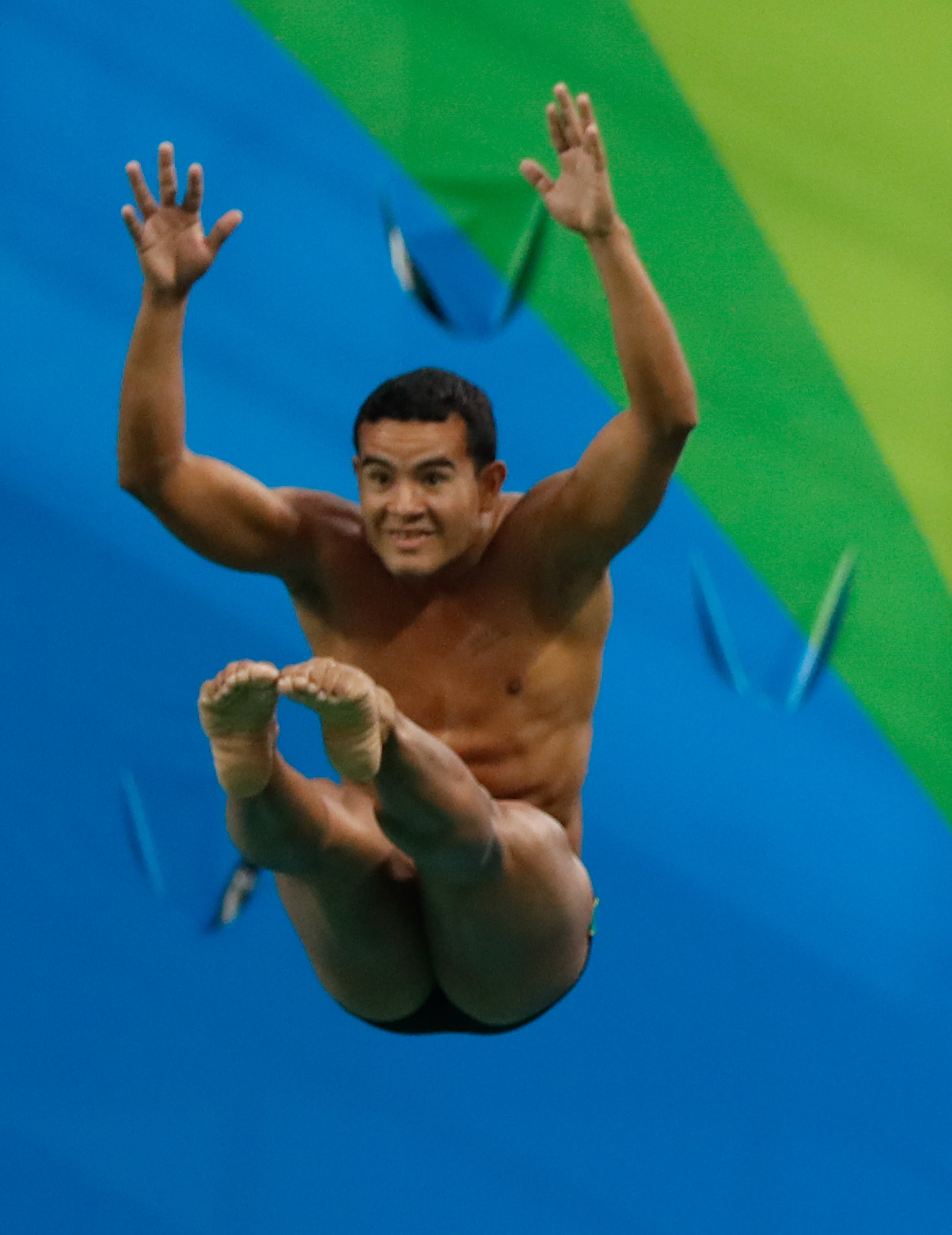
- Matos at the 2016 Olympics

Personal information
- Full name: Ian Carlos Gonçalves de Matos
- Born: 24 April 1989 Muaná, Pará, Brazil
- Died: 21 December 2021 (aged 32) Rio de Janeiro, Rio de Janeiro, Brazil

Sport
- Sport: Diving
- Event: synchronized 3 metre springboard
Medal record
Men's diving
Representing Brazil
South American Games
Bronze medal – third place	2010 Medellín	1 m springboard
Bronze medal – third place	2010 Medellín	3 m springboard
Bronze medal – third place	2010 Medellin	3 m synchronized springboard

Ian Carlos Gonçalves de Matos (Note: This name uses Portuguese naming customs: the first or maternal family name is Gonçalves and the second or paternal family name is de Matos.) (24 April 1989 – 21 December 2021), was a Brazilian diver. He competed in the men's synchronized 3 metre springboard at the 2016 Summer Olympics, where he and Luiz Outerelo finished 8th out of 8 teams. He won three bronzes at the 2010 South American Games. He died from lung infection on 21 December 2021, at the age of 32 in Rio de Janeiro.
