= Hugo Parisi =

Brazilian diver (born 1984)

Personal information
- Born: August 1, 1984 (age 41) Taguatinga, Federal District, Brazil
Medal record
Men's diving
Representing Brazil
Universiade
Bronze medal – third place	2005 İzmir	Team event
South American Games
Gold medal – first place	2014 Santiago	10m platform
Silver medal – second place	2010 Medellín	Synchro 10m platform
Bronze medal – third place	2010 Medellín	10m platform
South American Championships
Silver medal – second place	2008 São Paulo	10m platform
Silver medal – second place	2008 São Paulo	Synchro 10m platform

Hugo Pellicer Parisi (born August 1, 1984) is a male diver from Brazil, who competed at four consecutive Summer Olympic Games for his native country, starting in 2004. A member of Associação Peneira Olimpica de Esportes he claimed two silver medals at the 2008 South American Swimming Championships in São Paulo.
