= 2016 APB and WSB Olympic Qualifier =

Boxing competitions

- Venue: Jose Maria Vargas Dome
- Location: Vargas, Venezuela
- Start date: July 3, 2016
- End date: July 8, 2016
- Competitors: 79 from 40 nations

The 2016 APB and WSB Olympic Qualifier for the boxing tournament at the 2016 Summer Olympics in Rio de Janeiro, Brazil, was held between July 3 and July 8, 2016 in Vargas, Venezuela.

== Medal table ==
Rank	NOC	Gold	Silver	Bronze	Total
1	Mexico	3	0	0	3
2	Venezuela	2	1	2	5
3	Ecuador	2	1	0	3
4	Colombia	1	0	1	2
5	Armenia	1	0	0	1
5	Kenya	1	0	0	1
7	Germany	0	2	1	3
8	Ukraine	0	1	4	5
9	Cameroon	0	1	0	1
9	Croatia	0	1	0	1
9	Dominican Republic	0	1	0	1
9	Qatar	0	1	0	1
9	Thailand	0	1	0	1
14	Turkey	0	0	3	3
15	Argentina	0	0	2	2
16	Brazil	0	0	1	1
16	China	0	0	1	1
16	India	0	0	1	1
16	Italy	0	0	1	1
16	Poland	0	0	1	1
16	South Korea	0	0	1	1
16	Spain	0	0	1	1
Total		10	10	20	40

== Qualified boxers ==
Event	Gold	Silver	Bronze	Bronze
Light flyweight (49 kg)	Joselito Velázquez (MEX)	Carlos Quipo (ECU)	Leandro Blanc (ARG)	Shin Jong-hun (KOR)
Flyweight (52 kg)	Yoel Finol Rivas (VEN)	Hamza Touba (GER)	Ceiber Ávila (COL)	Maksym Fatych (UKR)
Bantamweight (56 kg)	Benson Gicharu (KEN)	Héctor García (DOM)	Victor Rodríguez (VEN)	Ibrahim Gökçek (TUR)
Lightweight (60 kg)	Lindolfo Delgado (MEX)	Amnat Ruenroeng (THA)	Carmine Tommasone (ITA)	Yasin Yılmaz (TUR)
Light welterweight (64 kg)	Hovhannes Bachkov (ARM)	Thulasi Tharumalingam (QAT)	Volodymyr Matviychuk (UKR)	Carlos Daniel Aquino (ARG)
Welterweight (69 kg)	Juan Pablo Romero (MEX)	Arajik Marutjan (GER)	Youba Sissokho (ESP)	Neeraj Goyat (IND)
Middleweight (75 kg)	Marlo Delgado (ECU)	Endry José Pinto (VEN)	Onder Şipal (TUR)	Xhek Paskali (GER)
Light heavyweight (81 kg)	Juan Carlos Carrillo (COL)	Hassan N'Dam N'Jikam (CMR)	Denys Solonenko (UKR)	Mateusz Tryc (POL)
Heavyweight (91 kg)	Julio Cesar Castillo (ECU)	Marko Čalić (CRO)	Alfonso Jose Millan (VEN)	Gevorg Manukian (UKR)
Super heavyweight (+91 kg)	Edgar Muñoz (VEN)	Rostyslav Arkhypenko (UKR)	Cosme Nascimento (BRA)	Mu Haipeng (CHN)

Boxer qualified for the 2016 Summer Olympics

== Summary ==
NOC	49	52	56	60	64	69	75	81	91	+91	Total
Argentina	X										1
Armenia					X						1
Cameroon								X			1
Colombia		X						X			2
Dominican Republic			X								1
Ecuador	X						X		X		3
Germany		X				X					2
Italy				X							1
Kenya			X								1
Mexico	X			X		X					3
Qatar					X						1
Spain						X					1
Thailand				X							1
Turkey							X				1
Ukraine					X			X			2
Venezuela		X	X				X			X	4
Total: 16 NOCs	3	3	3	3	3	3	3	3	1	1	26

== Results ==
=== Light flyweight (49 kg) ===
The top three boxers will qualify for the 2016 Summer Olympics.

Quarterfinals
Leandro Blanc (ARG)	3
Carlos Suárez (TTO)	0
Shin Jong-hun (KOR)	3
Nazar Kurotchyn (UKR)	0
Angelino Cordova (VEN)	0
Joselito Velázquez (MEX)	3

Semifinals
Carlos Quipo (ECU)	3
Leandro Blanc (ARG)	0
Shin Jong-hun (KOR)	0
Joselito Velázquez (MEX)	3

Final
Carlos Quipo (ECU)	0
Joselito Velázquez (MEX)	3
Olympic box-off
Leandro Blanc (ARG)	3
Shin Jong-hun (KOR)	0

=== Flyweight (52 kg) ===
The top three boxers will qualify for the 2016 Summer Olympics.

Quarterfinals
Maksym Fatych (UKR)	3
Gaurav Bidhuri (IND)	0
Hermogenes de Castillo (NCA)	0
Hamza Touba (GER)	3

Semifinals
Yoel Finol Rivas (VEN)	3
Maksym Fatych (UKR)	0
Hamza Touba (GER)	3
Ceiber Ávila (COL)	0

Final
Yoel Finol Rivas (VEN)	3
Hamza Touba (GER)	0
Olympic box-off
Maksym Fatych (UKR)	0
Ceiber Ávila (COL)	3

=== Bantamweight (56 kg) ===
The top three boxers will qualify for the 2016 Summer Olympics.

Quarterfinals
Benson Gicharu (KEN)	3
Riccardo D'Andrea (ITA)	0
Ham Sang-myeong (KOR)	0
Ibrahim Gökçek (TUR)	3
Edgardo Rolón (PUR)	0
Héctor García (DOM)	3

Semifinals
Victor Rodríguez (VEN)	0
Benson Gicharu (KEN)	3
Ibrahim Gökçek (TUR)	0
Héctor García (DOM)	3

Final
Benson Gicharu (KEN)	WO
Héctor García (DOM)
Olympic box-off
Victor Rodríguez (VEN)	2
Ibrahim Gökçek (TUR)	0

=== Lightweight (60 kg) ===
The top three boxers will qualify for the 2016 Summer Olympics.

Quarterfinals
Yasin Yılmaz (TUR)	2
José Javier Rosario (PUR)	1
Carmine Tommasone (ITA)	3
Oleh Dovhun (UKR)	0
Artur Bril (GER)	0
Amnat Ruenroeng (THA)	3

Semifinals
Lindolfo Delgado (MEX)	3
Yasin Yılmaz (TUR)	0
Carmine Tommasone (ITA)	0
Amnat Ruenroeng (THA)	3

Final
Lindolfo Delgado (MEX)	TKO
Amnat Ruenroeng (THA)
Olympic box-off
Yasin Yılmaz (TUR)	1
Carmine Tommasone (ITA)	2

=== Light welterweight (64 kg) ===
The top three boxers will qualify for the 2016 Summer Olympics.

Quarterfinals
Thulasi Tharumalingam (QAT)	3
Massimiliano Ballisai (ITA)	0
Carlos Portillo (PAR)	0
Volodymyr Matviychuk (UKR)	3
Raymond Moylette (IRL)	0
Hovhannes Bachkov (ARM)	3

Semifinals
Carlos Daniel Aquino (ARG)	0
Thulasi Tharumalingam (QAT)	3
Volodymyr Matviychuk (UKR)	0
Hovhannes Bachkov (ARM)	3

Final
Thulasi Tharumalingam (QAT)
Hovhannes Bachkov (ARM)	TKO
Olympic box-off
Carlos Daniel Aquino (ARG)
Volodymyr Matviychuk (UKR)	WO

=== Welterweight (69 kg) ===
The top three boxers will qualify for the 2016 Summer Olympics.

Quarterfinals
Serhii Bohachuk (UKR)	0
Youba Sissokho (ESP)	3
Dimitrios Tsagkrakos (GRE)	0
Neeraj Goyat (IND)	3
Paul Kroll (USA)	0
Arajik Marutjan (GER)	3

Semifinals
Juan Pablo Romero (MEX)	3
Youba Sissokho (ESP)	0
Neeraj Goyat (IND)	0
Arajik Marutjan (GER)	3

Final
Juan Pablo Romero (MEX)	WO
Arajik Marutjan (GER)
Olympic box-off
Youba Sissokho (ESP)	3
Neeraj Goyat (IND)	0

=== Middleweight (75 kg) ===
The top three boxers will qualify for the 2016 Summer Olympics.

Round of 16
Raúl Sánchez (DOM)	3
Geard Ajetović (SRB)	0

Quarterfinals
Marlo Delgado (ECU)	3
Raúl Sánchez (DOM)	0
Francisco Alexis Abreu (ESP)	0
Onder Şipal (TUR)	3
Endry José Pinto (VEN)	3
Arman Hakobyan (BUL)	0
Bogdan Juratoni (ROU)	0
Xhek Paskali (GER)	3

Semifinals
Marlo Delgado (ECU)	3
Onder Şipal (TUR)	0
Endry José Pinto (VEN)	3
Xhek Paskali (GER)	0

Final
Marlo Delgado (ECU)	3
Endry José Pinto (VEN)	0
Olympic box-off
Onder Şipal (TUR)	3
Xhek Paskali (GER)	0

=== Light heavyweight (81 kg) ===
The top three boxers will qualify for the 2016 Summer Olympics.

Round of 16
Norbert Nemesápati (HUN)	0
Mateusz Tryc (POL)	3
Petar Mauković (SRB)
Juan Carlos Carrillo (COL)	KO
Dilbag Singh (IND)	1
Petru Ciobanu (MDA)	2
Denys Solonenko (UKR)	3
Shi Guojun (CHN)	0
Jonathan Esquivel (USA)	2
Spas Genov (BUL)	1

Quarterfinals
Ladislav Kutil (CZE)	0
Mateusz Tryc (POL)	3
Juan Carlos Carrillo (COL)	3
Petru Ciobanu (MDA)	0
Rogelio Romero (MEX)	0
Denys Solonenko (UKR)	3
Jonathan Esquivel (USA)	0
Hassan N'Dam N'Jikam (CMR)	3

Semifinals
Mateusz Tryc (POL)
Juan Carlos Carrillo (COL)	KO
Denys Solonenko (UKR)	0
Hassan N'Dam N'Jikam (CMR)	3

Final
Juan Carlos Carrillo (COL)	3
Hassan N'Dam N'Jikam (CMR)	0
Olympic box-off
Mateusz Tryc (POL)
Denys Solonenko (UKR)	WO

=== Heavyweight (91 kg) ===
The winner will qualify for the 2016 Summer Olympics.

Quarterfinals		Semifinals		Final
		Alfonso Jose Millan (VEN)	0
Israel Duffus (PAN)	0	Marko Čalić (CRO)	3
Marko Čalić (CRO)	3			Marko Čalić (CRO)	0
Cam Awesome (USA)	0			Julio Cesar Castillo (ECU)	3
Julio Cesar Castillo (ECU)	3	Julio Cesar Castillo (ECU)	3
		Gevorg Manukian (UKR)	0

=== Super heavyweight (+91 kg) ===
The winner will qualify for the 2016 Summer Olympics.

Round of 16
Evan Nedd (ARU)	1
Ahmed Samir Hefny (EGY)	2
Rostyslav Arkhypenko (UKR)	3
Brandon Lynch (USA)	0

Quarterfinals
Edgar Muñoz (VEN)	3
Ahmed Samir Hefny (EGY)	0
Istvan Bernath (HUN)	0
Cosme Nascimento (BRA)	3
Newfel Ouatah (ALG)	0
Mu Haipeng (CHN)	3
Rostyslav Arkhypenko (UKR)	3
Magomed Omarov (RUS)	0

Semifinals
Edgar Muñoz (VEN)	3
Cosme Nascimento (BRA)	0
Mu Haipeng (CHN)	0
Rostyslav Arkhypenko (UKR)	3

Final
Edgar Muñoz (VEN)	3
Rostyslav Arkhypenko (UKR)	0
