= 2016 World Wrestling Olympic Qualification Tournament 1 =

The 2016 World Wrestling Olympic Qualification Tournament 1 was the first of two worldwide qualification tournaments for the 2016 Olympics. Competitors at this tournament failed to qualify for the Olympics at the 2015 World Wrestling Championships or at their respective regional qualifier. The top three competitors in each weight class for the men and top two competitors for the women qualified.

It was held between 22–24 April 2016 in Ulaanbaatar, Mongolia.

== Men's freestyle ==
=== 57 kg ===
24 April

Round of 32
| Adrian Hajduk (POL) | 1–7 | Pedro Mejías (VEN) |
| Ulukbek Zholdoshbekov (KGZ) | 9–0 | Fatos Durmishi (FIN) |

Round of 16
Nodirjon Safarov (UZB) | 2
Uladzislau Andreyeu (BLR) | 6
Levan Metreveli (ESP) | 10
James Mancini (ITA) | 0
Darthe Capellan (CAN) | 0
Ivan Guidea (ROU) | 10
Charles Fernando (SRI) | 0
Andriy Yatsenko (UKR) | 4^{F}
Mirjalal Hasanzada (AZE) | 10
Ethan Aguigui (GUM) | 0
Liang Shaofeng (CHN) | 2
Alexandru Chirtoacă (MDA) | 4
Sandeep Tomar (IND) | 11
Sezar Akgül (TUR) | 0
Pedro Mejías (VEN) | 7
Ulukbek Zholdoshbekov (KGZ) | 8

Quarterfinals
Uladzislau Andreyeu (BLR) | 2
Levan Metreveli (ESP) | 1
Ivan Guidea (ROU) | 11
Andriy Yatsenko (UKR) | 1
Mirjalal Hasanzada (AZE) | 10
Alexandru Chirtoacă (MDA) | 0
Sandeep Tomar (IND) | 4
Ulukbek Zholdoshbekov (KGZ) | 1

Semifinals
Uladzislau Andreyeu (BLR) | 3
Ivan Guidea (ROU) | 4
Mirjalal Hasanzada (AZE) | 8
Sandeep Tomar (IND) | 8

Final
Ivan Guidea (ROU) | 8
Mirjalal Hasanzada (AZE) | 3
Olympic wrestle-off
Andriy Yatsenko (UKR) | 0
Sandeep Tomar (IND) | 11

Repechage round 2
Darthe Capellan (CAN) | 6
Andriy Yatsenko (UKR) | 11
Ethan Aguigui (GUM) | 2
Alexandru Chirtoacă (MDA) | 12

Bronze medals
Andriy Yatsenko (UKR) | 10
Uladzislau Andreyeu (BLR) | 2
Alexandru Chirtoacă (MDA) | 0
Sandeep Tomar (IND) | 10

=== 65 kg ===
24 April

Round of 32
| Brandon Díaz (MEX) | 0–5 | David Safaryan (ARM) |
| Jean Bernard Diatta (SEN) | 2–7 | Aleksandr Kontoev (BLR) |
| Iurii Siemakin (FRA) | 8–2 | Jon Kum-su (PRK) |
| Haislan Garcia (CAN) | 12–0 | Kevin Bonilla (HON) |
| George Bucur (ROU) | 0–11 | Adam Batirov (BRN) |
| David Habat (SLO) | 9–0 | Mykola Bolotňuk (SVK) |
| Shogo Maeda (JPN) | 1–2 | Sayatbek Okassov (KAZ) |
| Lee Seung-chul (KOR) | 10–0 | Temir Timir (TJK) |
| Mihail Sava (MDA) | 6–7 | Samet Dülger (GER) |
| Nguyễn Xuân Định (VIE) | 0–12 | Frank Molinaro (USA) |
| Steven Graf (SUI) | 0–11 | Yakup Gör (TUR) |

Round of 16
Adilet Mamataev (KGZ) | 12
Chamara Perera (SRI) | 2
Borislav Novachkov (BUL) | 10
Abdulrahman Ibrahim (QAT) | 0
Zurabi Iakobishvili (GEO) | 4
David Safaryan (ARM) | 1
Aleksandr Kontoev (BLR) | 1
Iurii Siemakin (FRA) | 2
Haislan Garcia (CAN) | 3
Adam Batirov (BRN) | 4
David Habat (SLO) | 8
Sayatbek Okassov (KAZ) | 7
Lee Seung-chul (KOR) | 10
Samet Dülger (GER) | 0
Frank Molinaro (USA) | 4
Yakup Gör (TUR) | 6

Quarterfinals
Adilet Mamataev (KGZ) | 2
Borislav Novachkov (BUL) | 12
Zurabi Iakobishvili (GEO) | 3
Iurii Siemakin (FRA) | 1
Adam Batirov (BRN) | 10
David Habat (SLO) | 0
Lee Seung-chul (KOR) | 1
Yakup Gör (TUR) | 11

Semifinals
Borislav Novachkov (BUL) | 4
Zurabi Iakobishvili (GEO) | 5
Adam Batirov (BRN) | 7
Yakup Gör (TUR) | 2

Final
Zurabi Iakobishvili (GEO) | 1
Adam Batirov (BRN) | 3
Olympic wrestle-off
Borislav Novachkov (BUL) | 2
Yakup Gör (TUR) | 4

Repechage round 1
George Bucur (ROU) | 6
Haislan Garcia (CAN) | 2

Repechage round 2
David Safaryan (ARM) | 6
Iurii Siemakin (FRA) | 2
George Bucur (ROU) | 1
David Habat (SLO) | 6

Bronze medals
David Safaryan (ARM) | 0
Borislav Novachkov (BUL) | 11
David Habat (SLO) | 0
Yakup Gör (TUR) | 6

- Following the disqualification of Andriy Kviatkovskyi at the European Qualification Tournament, his spot went to Zurabi Iakobishvili from Georgia. Following this adjustment, Borislav Novachkov earns the Olympic quota won by Georgia.

=== 74 kg ===
24 April

Round of 32
| Grigor Grigoryan (ARM) | 4–3 | Innokenti Innokentev (KGZ) |
| Soner Demirtaş (TUR) | 10–0 | Lee Yun-seok (KOR) |
| Gamid Dzhalilov (TJK) | 10–0 | Carmelo Lumia (ITA) |
| Ishan Abeyrathna (SRI) | 0–10 | Christian Anguiano (MEX) |
| Michal Duba (SVK) | 0–10 | Alberts Jurčenko (LAT) |
| Andrzej Sokalski (POL) | 10–0 | Asnage Castelly (HAI) |
| Rashid Kurbanov (UZB) | 4–1 | Cleopas Ncube (CAN) |
| Oleh Bilotserkivskyi (UKR) | 10–0 | Yoan Blanco (ECU) |
| Cấn Tất Dự (VIE) | 2–13 | Pedro Soto (PUR) |

Round of 16
Zhang Chongyao (CHN) | 1
Georg Harth (GER) | 6
Georgi Ivanov (BUL) | 9
Evgheni Nedealco (MDA) | 6
Mihály Nagy (HUN) | 11
Raman Chytadze (BLR) | 10
Georgios Savvoulidis (GRE) | 3
Grigor Grigoryan (ARM) | 10
Soner Demirtaş (TUR) | 6
Gamid Dzhalilov (TJK) | 0
Christian Anguiano (MEX) | 1
Alberts Jurčenko (LAT) | 12
Andrzej Sokalski (POL) | 0
Rashid Kurbanov (UZB) | 10
Oleh Bilotserkivskyi (UKR) | 10
Pedro Soto (PUR) | 0

Quarterfinals
Georg Harth (GER) | 0
Georgi Ivanov (BUL) | 6
Mihály Nagy (HUN) | 10
Grigor Grigoryan (ARM) | 6
Soner Demirtaş (TUR) | 9
Alberts Jurčenko (LAT) | 0
Rashid Kurbanov (UZB) | 4
Oleh Bilotserkivskyi (UKR) | 5

Semifinals
Georgi Ivanov (BUL) | 10
Mihály Nagy (HUN) | 7
Soner Demirtaş (TUR) | 4
Oleh Bilotserkivskyi (UKR) | 0

Final
Georgi Ivanov (BUL) | 1
Soner Demirtaş (TUR) | 12
Olympic wrestle-off
Evgheni Nedealco (MDA) | 6
Oleh Bilotserkivskyi (UKR) | 0

Repechage round 1
Lee Yun-seok (KOR) | 3
Gamid Dzhalilov (TJK) | 5

Repechage round 2
Evgheni Nedealco (MDA) | 14
Georg Harth (GER) | 0
Gamid Dzhalilov (TJK) | 10
Alberts Jurčenko (LAT) | 7

Bronze medals
Evgheni Nedealco (MDA) | 9
Mihály Nagy (HUN) | 2
Gamid Dzhalilov (TJK) | 2
Oleh Bilotserkivskyi (UKR) | 3

=== 86 kg ===
24 April

Round of 32
| Quintino Intipe (GBS) | 3–12 Fall | Aibek Usupov (KGZ) |
| Masao Matsusaka (JPN) | 1–8 | Tamerlan Tagziev (CAN) |
| Bakhodur Kadirov (TJK) | 4–9 | Michael Kaufmehl (GER) |
| Armands Zvirbulis (LAT) | 0–10 | Kim Gwan-uk (KOR) |
| Gheorghiță Ștefan (ROU) | 2–4 | Zbigniew Baranowski (POL) |
| Timofei Xenidis (GRE) | 10–0 | Muhammad Inam (PAK) |
| J'den Cox (USA) | 11–0 | Shamir Atyan (ARM) |

Round of 16
Somveer Kadian (IND) | 0
Piotr Ianulov (MDA) | 10
Pedro Ceballos (VEN) | 13
Zhang Feng (CHN) | 2
Pool Ambrocio (PER) | 4
Marco Riesen (SUI) | 1
Liubomyr Sagaliuk (UKR) | 10
Aron Caneva (ITA) | 0
Umidjon Ismanov (UZB) | 13^{F}
Aibek Usupov (KGZ) | 6
Tamerlan Tagziev (CAN) | 8
Michael Kaufmehl (GER) | 6
Kim Gwan-uk (KOR) | 6
Zbigniew Baranowski (POL) | 8
Timofei Xenidis (GRE) | 0
J'den Cox (USA) | 10

Quarterfinals
Piotr Ianulov (MDA) | 4
Pedro Ceballos (VEN) | 4
Pool Ambrocio (PER) | 2
Liubomyr Sagaliuk (UKR) | 8
Umidjon Ismanov (UZB) | 4
Tamerlan Tagziev (CAN) | 4
Zbigniew Baranowski (POL) | 1
J'den Cox (USA) | 4

Semifinals
Pedro Ceballos (VEN) | 12
Liubomyr Sagaliuk (UKR) | 4
Umidjon Ismanov (UZB) | 2
J'den Cox (USA) | 5

Final
Pedro Ceballos (VEN) | 0
J'den Cox (USA) | 6
Olympic wrestle-off
Zhang Feng (CHN) | 3
Zbigniew Baranowski (POL) | 4

Repechage round 1
Shamir Atyan (ARM) | 10
Timofei Xenidis (GRE) | 2

Repechage round 2
Zhang Feng (CHN) | 8
Piotr Ianulov (MDA) | 4
Shamir Atyan (ARM) | 4
Zbigniew Baranowski (POL) | 5

Bronze medals
Zhang Feng (CHN) | 8
Liubomyr Sagaliuk (UKR) | 7
Zbigniew Baranowski (POL) | 7
Umidjon Ismanov (UZB) | 1

=== 97 kg ===
24 April

Round of 32
| Micheil Tsikovani (GRE) | 0–10 | Dorjkhandyn Khüderbulga (MGL) |
| Firuz Yakubov (TJK) | 0–4 | Attila Szmik (HUN) |
| Arjun Gill (CAN) | 0–2 | Gennadij Cudinovic (GER) |
| Satyawart Kadian (IND) | 13–2 | Zhang Xueyi (CHN) |

Round of 16
Vlad Caraș (ROU) | 6^{F}
Magomedgaji Nurov (MKD) | 0
Philipp Hutter (SUI) | 0
Georgy Ketoev (ARM) | 11
Nicolae Ceban (MDA) | 10
Héctor Rodríguez (ESP) | 0
Imants Lagodskis (LAT) | 2
Aliaksandr Hushtyn (BLR) | 5
Magomed Ibragimov (UZB) | 4^{F}
Kim Jae-gang (KOR) | 0
Jozef Jaloviar (SVK) | 0
Takeshi Yamaguchi (JPN) | 6
Dorjkhandyn Khüderbulga (MGL) | 2
Attila Szmik (HUN) | 0
Gennadij Cudinovic (GER) | 5
Satyawart Kadian (IND) | 4

Quarterfinals
Vlad Caraș (ROU) | 0
Georgy Ketoev (ARM) | 11
Nicolae Ceban (MDA) | 2
Aliaksandr Hushtyn (BLR) | 0
Magomed Ibragimov (UZB) | 11
Takeshi Yamaguchi (JPN) | 0
Dorjkhandyn Khüderbulga (MGL) | 3
Gennadij Cudinovic (GER) | 1

Semifinals
Georgy Ketoev (ARM) | 7
Nicolae Ceban (MDA) | 0
Magomed Ibragimov (UZB) | 9
Dorjkhandyn Khüderbulga (MGL) | 2

Final
Georgy Ketoev (ARM) | 4
Magomed Ibragimov (UZB) | 3
Olympic wrestle-off
Nicolae Ceban (MDA) | 9
Dorjkhandyn Khüderbulga (MGL) | 4

Repechage round 2
Philipp Hutter (SUI) | 2
Vlad Caraș (ROU) | 4
Kim Jae-gang (KOR) | 3
Takeshi Yamaguchi (JPN) | 1

Bronze medals
Vlad Caraș (ROU) | 0
Nicolae Ceban (MDA) | 10
Kim Jae-gang (KOR) | 1
Dorjkhandyn Khüderbulga (MGL) | 4

=== 125 kg ===
24 April

Round of 32
| Soslan Gaglojev (SVK) | 2–4 Fall | Aiaal Lazarev (KGZ) |

Round of 16
Taiki Yamamoto (JPN) | 4
Khasanboy Rakhimov (UZB) | 4^{F}
Ioannis Arzoumanidis (GRE) | 1
Deng Zhiwei (CHN) | 5
Nam Kyung-jin (KOR) | 8
Farkhod Anakulov (TJK) | 0
Robert Baran (POL) | 10
Antoine Jaoude (BRA) | 0
Rareș Chintoan (ROU) | 5
Lyuben Iliev (BUL) | 6
Sumit Malik (IND) | 4
Dániel Ligeti (HUN) | 6
Luis Vivenes (VEN) | 12
Jesse Ruíz (MEX) | 2
Edgardo López (PUR) | 2
Aiaal Lazarev (KGZ) | 13

Quarterfinals
Khasanboy Rakhimov (UZB) | 0
Deng Zhiwei (CHN) | 10
Nam Kyung-jin (KOR) | 1
Robert Baran (POL) | 12
Lyuben Iliev (BUL) | 3
Dániel Ligeti (HUN) | 7
Luis Vivenes (VEN) | 6
Aiaal Lazarev (KGZ) | 9^{F}

Semifinals
Deng Zhiwei (CHN) | 11
Robert Baran (POL) | 3
Dániel Ligeti (HUN) | 4
Aiaal Lazarev (KGZ) | 0

Final
Deng Zhiwei (CHN) | WO
Dániel Ligeti (HUN)
Olympic wrestle-off
Robert Baran (POL) | 5
Lyuben Iliev (BUL) | 1

Repechage round 2
Ioannis Arzoumanidis (GRE) | 10
Khasanboy Rakhimov (UZB) | 0
Sumit Malik (IND)
Lyuben Iliev (BUL) | WO

Bronze medals
Ioannis Arzoumanidis (GRE) | 2
Robert Baran (POL) | 2
Lyuben Iliev (BUL) | 3
Aiaal Lazarev (KGZ) | 1

- Following the disqualification of Alen Zaseyev at the European Qualification Tournament in Serbia, his spot went to Dániel Ligeti from Hungary. Following this adjustment, Aiaal Lazarev earns the Olympic quota won by Hungary. Bulgaria would have been the replacement but was also earned the quota in Serbia.

== Men's Greco-Roman ==
=== 59 kg ===
22 April

Round of 32
| Roman Amoyan (ARM) | 4–7 | Hamid Sourian (IRI) |
| Kim Seung-hak (KOR) | 4–0 Fall | Albert Baghumyan (ESP) |
| Steven Takahashi (CAN) | 0–8 | Virgil Munteanu (ROU) |
| Apostolos Manouilidis (GRE) | 0–8 | Péter Módos (HUN) |
| Jesse Thielke (USA) | 5–6 | Gaurav Sharma (IND) |
| Federico Manea (ITA) | 0–8 | Frunze Harutyunyan (SWE) |
| Andrey Tsaryuk (ISR) | 2–10 | Elmurat Tasmuradov (UZB) |

Round of 16
Erhan Karakuş (TUR) | 3
Victor Ciobanu (MDA) | 7
Revaz Lashkhi (GEO) | 2
Stig-André Berge (NOR) | 6^{F}
Ali Soto (MEX) | 6
Dmytro Tsymbaliuk (UKR) | 8
Michał Tracz (POL) | 5
Jussi-Pekka Niemistö (FIN) | 0
Ivo Angelov (BUL) | 9
Hamid Sourian (IRI) | 4
Kim Seung-hak (KOR) | 6
Virgil Munteanu (ROU) | 3
Péter Módos (HUN) | 8
Gaurav Sharma (IND) | 0
Frunze Harutyunyan (SWE) | 2
Elmurat Tasmuradov (UZB) | 11

Quarterfinals
Victor Ciobanu (MDA) | 1
Stig-André Berge (NOR) | 1
Dmytro Tsymbaliuk (UKR) | 4
Michał Tracz (POL) | 0
Ivo Angelov (BUL) | 0
Kim Seung-hak (KOR) | 9
Péter Módos (HUN) | 0
Elmurat Tasmuradov (UZB) | 11

Semifinals
Stig-André Berge (NOR) | 3
Dmytro Tsymbaliuk (UKR) | 1
Kim Seung-hak (KOR) | 11
Elmurat Tasmuradov (UZB) | 2

Final
Stig-André Berge (NOR) | 0
Kim Seung-hak (KOR) | 6
Olympic wrestle-off
Revaz Lashkhi (GEO) | 0
Elmurat Tasmuradov (UZB) | 4

Repechage round 1
Albert Baghumyan (ESP) | 2
Virgil Munteanu (ROU) | 3

Repechage round 2
Revaz Lashkhi (GEO) | 6
Victor Ciobanu (MDA) | 1
Virgil Munteanu (ROU) | 2
Ivo Angelov (BUL) | 5

Bronze medals
Revaz Lashkhi (GEO) | 4
Dmytro Tsymbaliuk (UKR) | 3
Ivo Angelov (BUL) | 0
Elmurat Tasmuradov (UZB) | 8

=== 66 kg ===
22 April

Round of 32
| Zheng Pan (CHN) | 2–4 | Edgaras Venckaitis (LTU) |
| Danijel Janečić (CRO) | 2–0 | Denys Demyankov (UKR) |
| Mateusz Bernatek (POL) | 1–7 | Atakan Yüksel (TUR) |
| Kairat Tugolbaev (KGZ) | 2–7 | Vladimiros Matias (GRE) |
| Filip Dubský (CZE) | 0–8 | Pavel Liakh (BLR) |
| Sayed Omid Hosseini (AFG) | 2–13 | Jair Cuero (COL) |
| Hugo Passos (POR) | 0–8 | Tero Välimäki (FIN) |
| Nikolay Vichev (BUL) | 2–2 | Davide Cascavilla (ITA) |
| Benedikt Puffer (AUT) | 0–8 | RaVaughn Perkins (USA) |
| Ravinder Singh (IND) | 1–10 | Meirambek Ainagulov (KAZ) |

Round of 16
Pål Eirik Gundersen (NOR) | 0
Ion Panait (ROU) | 11
Nicolas Christen (SUI) | 0
Zakarias Tallroth (SWE) | 5
Fredrik Bjerrehuus (DEN) | 2
Artak Margaryan (FRA) | 9^{F}
Edgaras Venckaitis (LTU) | 3
Danijel Janečić (CRO) | 0
Atakan Yüksel (TUR) | 7
Vladimiros Matias (GRE) | 2
Pavel Liakh (BLR) | 4
Jair Cuero (COL) | 2
Tero Välimäki (FIN) | 7
Nikolay Vichev (BUL) | 0
RaVaughn Perkins (USA) | 8
Meirambek Ainagulov (KAZ) | 0

Quarterfinals
Ion Panait (ROU) | 8
Zakarias Tallroth (SWE) | 0
Artak Margaryan (FRA) | 5
Edgaras Venckaitis (LTU) | 7^{F}
Atakan Yüksel (TUR) | 2
Pavel Liakh (BLR) | 2
Tero Välimäki (FIN) | 3
RaVaughn Perkins (USA) | 2

Semifinals
Ion Panait (ROU) | 6
Edgaras Venckaitis (LTU) | 2
Pavel Liakh (BLR) | 4
Tero Välimäki (FIN) | 8

Final
Ion Panait (ROU) | 3
Tero Välimäki (FIN) | 0
Olympic wrestle-off
Edgaras Venckaitis (LTU) | 5
RaVaughn Perkins (USA) | 0

Repechage round 1
Hugo Passos (POR) | 8
Nikolay Vichev (BUL) | 0

Repechage round 2
Pål Eirik Gundersen (NOR) | 0
Zakarias Tallroth (SWE) | 2
Hugo Passos (POR) | 0
RaVaughn Perkins (USA) | 6

Bronze medals
Zakarias Tallroth (SWE) | 2
Edgaras Venckaitis (LTU) | 6
RaVaughn Perkins (USA) | 7
Pavel Liakh (BLR) | 0

=== 75 kg ===
22 April

Round of 32
| Ciro Russo (ITA) | 0–3 | Mateusz Wolny (POL) |
| Damian Dietsche (SUI) | 4–13 | Yang Bin (CHN) |
| Robert Rosengren (SWE) | 4–1 | Jure Kuhar (SLO) |
| Pavel Powada (CZE) | 0–8 | Pascal Eisele (GER) |
| Luis Avendaño (VEN) | 10–4 | Ilian Georgiev (BUL) |
| Samat Shirdakov (KGZ) | 12–0 | Bakhit Sharif Badr (QAT) |
| Arsen Julfalakyan (ARM) | 0–7 | Péter Bácsi (HUN) |
| Neven Žugaj (CRO) | 3–0 | Dmytro Pyshkov (UKR) |
| Tokhirdzhon Okhonov (TJK) | 0–8 | Juan Ángel Escobar (MEX) |
| Shohei Yabiku (JPN) | 8–0 | Joseph Lopez (GUM) |
| Ilie Cojocari (ROU) | 7–4 | Harpreet Singh Sandhu (IND) |
| Florian Marchl (AUT) | 0–5 | Henri Välimäki (FIN) |

Round of 16
Igor Beşleaga (MDA) | 6
Georgios Prevolarakis (GRE) | 2
Selçuk Çebi (TUR) | 5
Aliaksandr Dzemyanovich (BLR) | 2
Mateusz Wolny (POL) | 1
Yang Bin (CHN) | 3
Robert Rosengren (SWE) | 2
Pascal Eisele (GER) | 3
Luis Avendaño (VEN) | 0
Samat Shirdakov (KGZ) | 2
Péter Bácsi (HUN) | 4
Neven Žugaj (CRO) | 1
Juan Ángel Escobar (MEX) | 6
Shohei Yabiku (JPN) | 3
Ilie Cojocari (ROU) | 4
Henri Välimäki (FIN) | 4

Quarterfinals
Igor Beşleaga (MDA) | 0
Selçuk Çebi (TUR) | 3
Yang Bin (CHN) | 6
Pascal Eisele (GER) | 4
Samat Shirdakov (KGZ) | 1
Péter Bácsi (HUN) | 12
Juan Ángel Escobar (MEX) | 0
Ilie Cojocari (ROU) | 2

Semifinals
Selçuk Çebi (TUR) | 2
Yang Bin (CHN) | 3
Péter Bácsi (HUN) | 6
Ilie Cojocari (ROU) | 0

Final
Yang Bin (CHN)
Péter Bácsi (HUN) | WO
Olympic wrestle-off
Pascal Eisele (GER) | 2
Arsen Julfalakyan (ARM) | 6

Repechage round 1
Damian Dietsche (SUI) | 2
Mateusz Wolny (POL) | 10
Arsen Julfalakyan (ARM) | 8
Neven Žugaj (CRO) | 0

Repechage round 2
Mateusz Wolny (POL) | 2
Pascal Eisele (GER) | 4
Arsen Julfalakyan (ARM) | 8
Samat Shirdakov (KGZ) | 0

Bronze medals
Pascal Eisele (GER) | 9
Selçuk Çebi (TUR) | 0
Arsen Julfalakyan (ARM) | 9^{F}
Ilie Cojocari (ROU) | 0

=== 85 kg ===
22 April

Round of 32
| Dimitrios Tsekeridis (GRE) | 4–9 | Maksim Manukyan (ARM) |
| Aleksandr Kazakevič (LTU) | 0–6 | Amer Hrustanović (AUT) |
| Gilberto Piquet (CUB) | 17–8 Fall | Pedro García (ESP) |
| Mélonin Noumonvi (FRA) | 3–2 | Şaban Karataş (TUR) |
| Attila Tamaș (ROU) | 0–9 | Ramsin Azizsir (GER) |
| Damian Janikowski (POL) | 3–8 | Roberti Kobliashvili (GEO) |
| Fabio Parisi (ITA) | 5–2 | Lee Se-yeol (KOR) |

Round of 16
Nenad Žugaj (CRO) | 3
Zakarias Berg (SWE) | 11
Javid Hamzatau (BLR) | 4
Eerik Aps (EST) | 2
Askhat Dilmukhamedov (KAZ) | 6
Ravinder Khatri (IND) | 0
Yorgen Cova (VEN) | 0
Taichi Oka (JPN) | 2
Artur Omarov (CZE) | 4
Maksim Manukyan (ARM) | 6
Amer Hrustanović (AUT) | 7
Gilberto Piquet (CUB) | 0
Mélonin Noumonvi (FRA) | 0
Ramsin Azizsir (GER) | 2
Roberti Kobliashvili (GEO) | 4
Fabio Parisi (ITA) | 3

Quarterfinals
Zakarias Berg (SWE) | 0
Javid Hamzatau (BLR) | 6
Askhat Dilmukhamedov (KAZ) | 0
Taichi Oka (JPN) | 2
Maksim Manukyan (ARM) | 6
Amer Hrustanović (AUT) | 0
Ramsin Azizsir (GER) | 7
Roberti Kobliashvili (GEO) | 0

Semifinals
Javid Hamzatau (BLR) | 4
Taichi Oka (JPN) | 0
Maksim Manukyan (ARM) | 12
Ramsin Azizsir (GER) | 4

Final
Javid Hamzatau (BLR) | 5
Maksim Manukyan (ARM) | 4
Olympic wrestle-off
Zakarias Berg (SWE) | 6
Amer Hrustanović (AUT) | 2

Repechage round 1
Dimitrios Tsekeridis (GRE) | 10
Artur Omarov (CZE) | 5

Repechage round 2
Eerik Aps (EST) | 0
Zakarias Berg (SWE) | 2
Dimitrios Tsekeridis (GRE) | 2
Amer Hrustanović (AUT) | 3

Bronze medals
Zakarias Berg (SWE) | 2
Taichi Oka (JPN) | 0
Amer Hrustanović (AUT) | 2
Ramsin Azizsir (GER) | 0

=== 98 kg ===
22 April

Round of 32
| Daniel Gastl (AUT) | 2–4 | Süleyman Demirci (TUR) |
| Peter Öhler (GER) | 3–0 | Robert Avanesyan (ISR) |
| Yerulan Iskakov (KAZ) | 2–4 | Orkhan Nuriyev (AZE) |
| Sukhrob Fattoev (UZB) | 1–1 | Radosław Grzybicki (POL) |
| Marthin Hamlet Nielsen (NOR) | 1–3 | Revaz Nadareishvili (GEO) |
| Uzur Dzhuzupbekov (KGZ) | 5–2 | Timo Kallio (FIN) |

Round of 16
Norikatsu Saikawa (JPN) | 11
Spyridon Kountouratzis (GRE) | 2
Daigoro Timoncini (ITA) | 1
Vilius Laurinaitis (LTU) | 1
An Chang-gun (KOR) | 3
Kevin Mejía (HON) | 0
David Vála (CZE) | 0
Aliaksandr Hrabovik (BLR) | 3
Joe Rau (USA) | 1
Fredrik Schön (SWE) | 4
Süleyman Demirci (TUR) | 0
Peter Öhler (GER) | 2
Orkhan Nuriyev (AZE) | 1
Radosław Grzybicki (POL) | 3
Revaz Nadareishvili (GEO) | 4
Uzur Dzhuzupbekov (KGZ) | 0

Quarterfinals
Norikatsu Saikawa (JPN) | 1
Daigoro Timoncini (ITA) | 2
An Chang-gun (KOR) | 0
Aliaksandr Hrabovik (BLR) | 8
Fredrik Schön (SWE) | 2
Peter Öhler (GER) | 1
Radosław Grzybicki (POL) | 0
Revaz Nadareishvili (GEO) | 6

Semifinals
Daigoro Timoncini (ITA) | 2
Aliaksandr Hrabovik (BLR) | 7
Fredrik Schön (SWE) | 1
Revaz Nadareishvili (GEO) | 4

Final
Aliaksandr Hrabovik (BLR) | 8
Revaz Nadareishvili (GEO) | 0
Olympic wrestle-off
Daigoro Timoncini (ITA) | 1
Fredrik Schön (SWE) | 2

Repechage round 1
Marthin Hamlet Nielsen (NOR) | 6
Uzur Dzhuzupbekov (KGZ) | 0

Repechage round 2
David Vála (CZE) | 2
An Chang-gun (KOR) | 4
Marthin Hamlet Nielsen (NOR) | 4
Radosław Grzybicki (POL) | 0

Bronze medals
An Chang-gun (KOR) | 1
Daigoro Timoncini (ITA) | 1
Marthin Hamlet Nielsen (NOR) | 0
Fredrik Schön (SWE) | 8

=== 130 kg ===
22 April

Round of 32
| Amir Ghasemi Monjazi (IRI) | 4–0 Fall | Luciano del Río (ARG) |

Round of 16
Arata Sonoda (JPN) | 2
Meng Qiang (CHN) | 7
Miloslav Metodiev (BUL) | 1
Mantas Knystautas (LTU) | 0
Johan Eurén (SWE) | 5
Lukas Hörmann (AUT) | 0
Edgardo López (PUR) | 0
Iakobi Kajaia (GEO) | 8
Kim Yong-min (KOR) | 0
Ioseb Chugoshvili (BLR) | 8
Naveen Sevlia (IND) | 0
Edgar Khachatryan (ARM) | 8
Nikolaos Leon (GRE) | 0
Muminjon Abdullaev (UZB) | 10
Bálint Lám (HUN) | 0
Amir Ghasemi Monjazi (IRI) | 2

Quarterfinals
Meng Qiang (CHN) | 2
Miloslav Metodiev (BUL) | 0
Johan Eurén (SWE) | 0
Iakobi Kajaia (GEO) | 3
Ioseb Chugoshvili (BLR) | 7
Edgar Khachatryan (ARM) | 2
Muminjon Abdullaev (UZB) | 1
Amir Ghasemi Monjazi (IRI) | 2^{F}

Semifinals
Meng Qiang (CHN) | 2
Iakobi Kajaia (GEO) | 1
Ioseb Chugoshvili (BLR) | 0
Amir Ghasemi Monjazi (IRI) | 2

Final
Meng Qiang (CHN)
Amir Ghasemi Monjazi (IRI) | WO
Olympic wrestle-off
Miloslav Metodiev (BUL) | 0
Muminjon Abdullaev (UZB) | 4

Repechage round 1
Luciano del Río (ARG) | 0
Bálint Lám (HUN) | 8

Repechage round 2
Arata Sonoda (JPN) | 0
Miloslav Metodiev (BUL) | 4^{F}
Bálint Lám (HUN) | 0
Muminjon Abdullaev (UZB) | 8

Bronze medals
Miloslav Metodiev (BUL) | 3^{F}
Iakobi Kajaia (GEO) | 0
Muminjon Abdullaev (UZB) | 1
Ioseb Chugoshvili (BLR) | 1

== Women's freestyle ==
=== 48 kg ===
23 April

Round of 32
| Lee Yu-mi (KOR) | 1–2 | Silvia Felice (ITA) |

Round of 16
Susana Almeida (BRA) | 0
Laura Peredo (MEX) | 3
Mariya Livach (UKR) | 4^{F}
Thalía Mallqui (PER) | 0
Sarianne Savola (FIN) | 1
Julie Sabatié (FRA) | 1
Haley Augello (USA) | 12
Viyaleta Chyryk (BLR) | 1
Evin Demirhan (TUR) | 3
Tsogt-Ochiryn Namuuntsetseg (MGL) | 8
Jaqueline Schellin (GER) | 0
Kim Hyon-gyong (PRK) | 10
Anna Łukasiak (POL) | 2
Liliana Santos (POR) | 1
Fredrika Petersson (SWE) | 11^{F}
Silvia Felice (ITA) | 0

Quarterfinals
Laura Peredo (MEX) | 2
Mariya Livach (UKR) | 8
Sarianne Savola (FIN) | 0
Haley Augello (USA) | 10
Tsogt-Ochiryn Namuuntsetseg (MGL) | 2
Kim Hyon-gyong (PRK) | 6
Anna Łukasiak (POL) | 4
Fredrika Petersson (SWE) | 3

Semifinals
Mariya Livach (UKR) | 0
Haley Augello (USA) | 10
Kim Hyon-gyong (PRK) | 6
Anna Łukasiak (POL) | 0

Final
Haley Augello (USA) | 2
Kim Hyon-gyong (PRK) | 9

Repechage round 2
Viyaleta Chyryk (BLR) | WO
Sarianne Savola (FIN)
Jaqueline Schellin (GER) | 3
Tsogt-Ochiryn Namuuntsetseg (MGL) | 1

Bronze medals
Viyaleta Chyryk (BLR) | 0
Mariya Livach (UKR) | 10
Jaqueline Schellin (GER) | 1
Anna Łukasiak (POL) | 3

=== 53 kg ===
23 April

Round of 32
| Natalia Malysheva (RUS) | 10–0 | Tiina Ylinen (FIN) |
| Iryna Kurachkina (BLR) | 4–4 | Mélanie Lesaffre (FRA) |
| Francesca Mori (ITA) | 2–8 | Lenka Hocková (CZE) |
| Ramóna Galambos (HUN) | 2–0 | Rozalia Tilegenova (KGZ) |
| Zukhra Mustanova (UZB) | 0–8 Fall | Maria Prevolaraki (GRE) |
| Bediha Gün (TUR) | 13–2 | Aizhan Ismagulova (KAZ) |

Round of 16
Alma Valencia (MEX) | 2
Helen Maroulis (USA) | 8
Babita Kumari (IND) | 5
Lee Shin-hye (KOR) | 0
Giullia Penalber (BRA) | 4
Lilya Horishna (UKR) | 10
Vânia Guerreiro (POR) | 4
Iulia Leorda (MDA) | 11
Simona Pricop (ROU) | 10
Chiu Hsin-ju (TPE) | 0
Natalia Malysheva (RUS) | 6
Mélanie Lesaffre (FRA) | 0
Lenka Hocková (CZE) | 2
Ramóna Galambos (HUN) | 3
Maria Prevolaraki (GRE) | 1
Bediha Gün (TUR) | 0

Quarterfinals
Helen Maroulis (USA) | 10
Babita Kumari (IND) | 0
Lilya Horishna (UKR) | 4
Iulia Leorda (MDA) | 4
Simona Pricop (ROU) | 0
Natalia Malysheva (RUS) | 10
Ramóna Galambos (HUN) | 4^{R}
Maria Prevolaraki (GRE) | 7

Semifinals
Helen Maroulis (USA) | 4^{F}
Lilya Horishna (UKR) | 0
Natalia Malysheva (RUS) | 5
Maria Prevolaraki (GRE) | 6

Final
Helen Maroulis (USA) | 10
Maria Prevolaraki (GRE) | 0

Repechage round 1
Zukhra Mustanova (UZB) | 0
Bediha Gün (TUR) | 10

Repechage round 2
Alma Valencia (MEX) | WO
Babita Kumari (IND)
Bediha Gün (TUR) | WO
Ramóna Galambos (HUN)

Bronze medals
Alma Valencia (MEX) | 8^{F}
Lilya Horishna (UKR) | 8
Bediha Gün (TUR) | 0
Natalia Malysheva (RUS) | 2^{F}

=== 58 kg ===
23 April

Round of 32
| Zhou Zhangting (CHN) | 4–4 | Lissette Antes (ECU) |
| Geeta Phogat (IND) | 8–4 | Yanet Sovero (PER) |
| Hong Hyang-rae (KOR) | 0–6 Fall | Grace Bullen (NOR) |
| Emese Barka (HUN) | 1–1 | Kelsey Campbell (USA) |
| Mariana Cherdivara (MDA) | 4–1 Fall | Carola Rainero (ITA) |
| Nabira Esenbaeva (UZB) | 6–9 | Irene García (ESP) |

Round of 16
Mia-Lahnee Aquino (GUM) | 0
Natalia Golts (RUS) | 8^{F}
Kiều Thị Ly (VIE) | 1
Veranika Ivanova (BLR) | 8
Luisa Niemesch (GER) | 8
Ayaulym Kassymova (KAZ) | 1
Virginia Jiménez (VEN) | 4
Roksana Zasina (POL) | 2
Alejandra Romero (MEX) | 4
Jong In-sun (PRK) | 9
Lissette Antes (ECU) | 6^{F}
Geeta Phogat (IND) | 0
Grace Bullen (NOR) | 9^{F}
Emese Barka (HUN) | 5
Mariana Cherdivara (MDA) | 11
Irene García (ESP) | 0

Quarterfinals
Natalia Golts (RUS) | 4
Veranika Ivanova (BLR) | 3
Luisa Niemesch (GER) | 11
Virginia Jiménez (VEN) | 0
Jong In-sun (PRK) | 5
Lissette Antes (ECU) | 8
Grace Bullen (NOR) | 0
Mariana Cherdivara (MDA) | 11

Semifinals
Natalia Golts (RUS) | 4
Luisa Niemesch (GER) | 5
Lissette Antes (ECU) | 7
Mariana Cherdivara (MDA) | 2

Final
Luisa Niemesch (GER) | 1
Lissette Antes (ECU) | 4

Repechage round 1
Zhou Zhangting (CHN) | WO
Geeta Phogat (IND)

Repechage round 2
Ayaulym Kassymova (KAZ) | 7
Virginia Jiménez (VEN) | 4
Zhou Zhangting (CHN) | 5
Jong In-sun (PRK) | 1

Bronze medals
Ayaulym Kassymova (KAZ) | 5
Natalia Golts (RUS) | 10
Zhou Zhangting (CHN) | 10
Mariana Cherdivara (MDA) | 0

=== 63 kg ===
23 April

Round of 16
Henna Johansson (SWE) | 7
Nadine Weinauge (GER) | 1
Monika Michalik (POL) | 5
Hafize Şahin (TUR) | 4^{F}
Seo Hee-jeong (KOR) | 0
Koumba Larroque (FRA) | 5
Phạm Thị Loan (VIE) | 1
Anita Sheoran (IND) | 4^{F}
Tayla Ford (NZL) | 5^{F}
Nathaly Grimán (VEN) | 0
Stevie Kelly (AUS) | 0
Marianna Sastin (HUN) | 10

Quarterfinals
Adéla Hanzlíčková (CZE) | 5
Leidy Izquierdo (COL) | 6
Henna Johansson (SWE) | 0
Hafize Şahin (TUR) | 9^{F}
Koumba Larroque (FRA) | 5
Anita Sheoran (IND) | 0
Tayla Ford (NZL) | 0
Marianna Sastin (HUN) | 10

Semifinals
Leidy Izquierdo (COL) | 0
Hafize Şahin (TUR) | 4
Koumba Larroque (FRA) | 1
Marianna Sastin (HUN) | 3

Final
Hafize Şahin (TUR) | WO
Marianna Sastin (HUN)

Repechage round 1
Monika Michalik (POL) | WO
Henna Johansson (SWE)
Stevie Kelly (AUS) | 0
Tayla Ford (NZL) | 11

Bronze medals
Monika Michalik (POL) | 6
Leidy Izquierdo (COL) | 2
Tayla Ford (NZL) | 0
Koumba Larroque (FRA) | 10

=== 69 kg ===
23 April

Round of 16
Gozal Zutova (AZE) | 6^{F}
Adina Popescu (ROU) | 0
Navjot Kaur (IND) | 0
Tamyra Mensah (USA) | 10
Yauheniya Andreichykava (BLR) | 6^{F}
Dzhanan Manolova (BUL) | 2
Martina Kuenz (AUT) | 0
Laura Skujiņa (LAT) | 6
Danutė Domikaitytė (LTU) | 6
Park Chae-rin (KOR) | 14^{F}
Alla Belinska (UKR) | 2
María Acosta (VEN) | 6

Quarterfinals
Ilana Kratysh (ISR) | 4^{F}
Diana Miranda (MEX) | 0
Gozal Zutova (AZE) | 7
Tamyra Mensah (USA) | 10
Yauheniya Andreichykava (BLR) | 3
Laura Skujiņa (LAT) | 2
Park Chae-rin (KOR) | 0
María Acosta (VEN) | 6^{F}

Semifinals
Ilana Kratysh (ISR) | 6
Tamyra Mensah (USA) | 5
Yauheniya Andreichykava (BLR) | 2
María Acosta (VEN) | 6

Final
Ilana Kratysh (ISR) | 5^{F}
María Acosta (VEN) | 0

Repechage round 1
Alla Belinska (UKR) | 7
Park Chae-rin (KOR) | 0

Bronze medals
Diana Miranda (MEX) | 0
Tamyra Mensah (USA) | 7
Alla Belinska (UKR) | 3^{F}
Yauheniya Andreichykava (BLR) | 0

=== 75 kg ===
23 April

Round of 16
Dayanara Rivera (PUR) | 1
Daria Osocka (POL) | 12
Maider Unda (ESP) | 2
Ekaterina Bukina (RUS) | 10
Ochirbatyn Burmaa (MGL) | 13
Hwang Eun-ju (KOR) | 2
Cynthia Vescan (FRA) | 5
Svetlana Saenko (MDA) | 2
Fanny Gradin (SWE) | 6
Jyoti (IND) | 10^{F}

Quarterfinals
Zsanett Németh (HUN) | 10
Chang Hui-tsz (TPE) | 0
Anna Schell (GER) | 5
Daria Osocka (POL) | 0
Ekaterina Bukina (RUS) | 3
Ochirbatyn Burmaa (MGL) | 1
Cynthia Vescan (FRA) | 11
Jyoti (IND) | 1

Semifinals
Zsanett Németh (HUN) | 4
Anna Schell (GER) | 2
Ekaterina Bukina (RUS) | 4
Cynthia Vescan (FRA) | 8

Final
Zsanett Németh (HUN) | 2
Cynthia Vescan (FRA) | 6

Repechage round 1
Svetlana Saenko (MDA) | 11
Jyoti (IND) | 0

Bronze medals
Chang Hui-tsz (TPE) | 0
Anna Schell (GER) | 10
Svetlana Saenko (MDA) | 0
Ekaterina Bukina (RUS) | 7
