= Matviychuk =

Matviychuk or Matveichuk (Ukrainian: Матвійчук) is a gender-neutral Ukrainian surname that may refer to

- Eduard Matviychuk (born 1963), Ukrainian regional administrator
- Semyon Matviychuk (born 1998), Russian football player
- Vasyl Matviychuk (born 1982), Ukrainian long-distance runner
- Volodymyr Matviychuk (born 1982), Ukrainian boxer
