= Ukraine at the 2016 Summer Olympics =

- IOC code: UKR
- NOC: National Olympic Committee of Ukraine
- Website: www.noc-ukr.org (in Ukrainian and English)

in Rio de Janeiro
- Competitors: 206 in 22 sports
- Flag bearers: Mykola Milchev (opening); Olha Kharlan (closing)
- Medals Ranked 31st: Gold 2 Silver 5 Bronze 4 Total 11

Summer Olympics appearances (overview)
- 1996; 2000; 2004; 2008; 2012; 2016; 2020; 2024

Other related appearances
- Austria (1896–1912); Hungary (1896–1912); Russian Empire (1900–1912); Czechoslovakia (1920–1936); Poland (1924–1936); Romania (1924–1936); Soviet Union (1952–1988); Unified Team (1992)

Ukraine competed at the 2016 Summer Olympics in Rio de Janeiro, Brazil, from 5 to 21 August 2016. This was the nation's sixth consecutive appearance at the Summer Olympics in the post-Soviet era.

Ukraine's medal tally was its lowest since independence, with only two gold and eleven total medals, a far cry from 9 gold and 23 total medals at the 1996 Summer Olympics and less than five gold and 19 medals overall at the 2012 Summer Olympics.

== Medalists ==
Medal	Name	Sport	Event	Date
Gold	Oleg Verniaiev	Gymnastics	Men's parallel bars	16 August
Gold	Iurii Cheban	Canoeing	Men's C-1 200 m	18 August
Silver	Serhiy Kulish	Shooting	Men's 10 m air rifle	8 August
Silver	Oleg Verniaiev	Gymnastics	Men's artistic individual all-around	10 August
Silver	Olga Kharlan; Alina Komashchuk; Olena Kravatska; Olena Voronina	Fencing	Women's team sabre	13 August
Silver	Zhan Beleniuk	Wrestling	Men's Greco Roman 85 kg	15 August
Silver	Pavlo Tymoshchenko	Modern pentathlon	Men's modern pentathlon	20 August
Bronze	Olga Kharlan	Fencing	Women's sabre	8 August
Bronze	Bohdan Bondarenko	Athletics	Men's high jump	16 August
Bronze	Dmytro Ianchuk; Taras Mishchuk	Canoeing	Men's C-2 1000 m	20 August
Bronze	Hanna Rizatdinova	Gymnastics	Women's rhythmic individual all-around	20 August

Medals by sport
Sport	1st place, gold medalist(s)	2nd place, silver medalist(s)	3rd place, bronze medalist(s)	Total
Gymnastics	1	1	1	3
Canoeing	1	0	1	2
Fencing	0	1	1	2
Modern pentathlon	0	1	0	1
Shooting	0	1	0	1
Wrestling	0	1	0	1
Athletics	0	0	1	1
Total	2	5	4	11

Medals by date
Day	Date	1st place, gold medalist(s)	2nd place, silver medalist(s)	3rd place, bronze medalist(s)	Total
Day 1	6 August	0	0	0	0
Day 2	7 August	0	0	0	0
Day 3	8 August	0	1	1	2
Day 4	9 August	0	0	0	0
Day 5	10 August	0	1	0	1
Day 6	11 August	0	0	0	0
Day 7	12 August	0	0	0	0
Day 8	13 August	0	1	0	1
Day 9	14 August	0	0	0	0
Day 10	15 August	0	1	0	1
Day 11	16 August	1	0	1	2
Day 12	17 August	0	0	0	0
Day 13	18 August	1	0	0	1
Day 14	19 August	0	0	0	0
Day 15	20 August	0	1	2	3
Day 16	21 August	0	0	0	0
Total		2	5	4	11

== Competitors ==
The following is the list of number of competitors participating in the Games. Note that reserves in fencing (3 competitors for Ukraine) are counted as athletes in the table:

Sport	Men	Women	Total
Archery	1	3	4
Athletics	19	46	65
Badminton	1	1	2
Boxing	4	1	5
Canoeing	4	5	9
Cycling	3	4	7
Diving	3	4	7
Equestrian	4	1	5
Fencing	5	9	14
Gymnastics	5	8	13
Judo	4	3	7
Modern pentathlon	2	1	3
Rowing	4	4	8
Sailing	3	0	3
Shooting	6	2	8
Swimming	5	2	7
Synchronized swimming	—	9	9
Table tennis	1	1	2
Tennis	2	5	7
Triathlon	1	1	2
Weightlifting	4	4	8
Wrestling	6	5	11
Total	87	119	206

== Archery ==
One Ukrainian archer qualified each for the men's individual recurve by obtaining one of the eight Olympic places available from the 2015 World Archery Championships in Copenhagen, Denmark. Three Ukrainian archers qualified for the women's events by virtue of the nation's podium finish in the team recurve competition at the 2016 Archery World Cup meet in Antalya, Turkey.

Athlete	Event	Ranking round		Round of 64	Round of 32	Round of 16	Quarterfinals	Semifinals	Final / BM	
Athlete	Event	Score	Seed	Opposition Score	Opposition Score	Opposition Score	Opposition Score	Opposition Score	Opposition Score	Rank
Viktor Ruban	Men's individual	663	25	Purnama (INA); W 7–3	Valladont (FRA); L 0–6	did not advance				
Veronika Marchenko	Women's individual	630	30	Nurmsalu (EST); W 6–0	Ki B-b (KOR); L 2–6	did not advance				
Anastasia Pavlova	Women's individual	630	29	Saidiyeva (KAZ); W 6–0	Tan Y-t (TPE); L 0–6	did not advance				
Lidiia Sichenikova	Women's individual	630	31	Narimanidze (GEO); W 7–1	Chang H-j (KOR); L 2–6	did not advance				
Veronika Marchenko; Anastasia Pavlova; Lidiia Sichenikova	Women's team	1890	8	—N/a		Japan; L 2–6	did not advance			

== Athletics ==
Ukrainian athletes achieved qualifying standards in the following athletics events (up to a maximum of 3 athletes in each event):

Key

- Note–Ranks given for track events are within the athlete's heat only
- Q = Qualified for the next round
- q = Qualified for the next round as a fastest loser or, in field events, by position without achieving the qualifying target
- NR = National record
- N/A = Round not applicable for the event
- Bye = Athlete not required to compete in round

Track & road events
Men

Athlete	Event	Heat		Semifinal		Final	
Athlete	Event	Result	Rank	Result	Rank	Result	Rank
Ihor Bodrov	200 m	20.86	7	did not advance			
Serhiy Smelyk	200 m	20.66	4	did not advance			
Vitaliy Butrym	400 m	45.92	4	did not advance			
Ihor Olefirenko	Marathon	—N/a				2:15:36	30
Ihor Russ	Marathon	—N/a				2:18:19	48
Oleksandr Sitkovskyy	Marathon	—N/a				2:14:24	20
Ruslan Dmytrenko	20 km walk	—N/a				1:21:40	16
Ihor Hlavan	20 km walk	—N/a				1:23:32	31
Nazar Kovalenko	20 km walk	—N/a				1:24:40	40
Ivan Banzeruk	50 km walk	—N/a				4:11:51	39
Serhiy Budza	50 km walk	—N/a				3:53:22	18
Ihor Hlavan	50 km walk	—N/a				DNF	

Women

Athlete	Event	Heat		Quarterfinal		Semifinal		Final	
Athlete	Event	Result	Rank	Result	Rank	Result	Rank	Result	Rank
Nataliya Pohrebnyak	100 m	Bye		11.30	3 q	11.32	7	did not advance	
Olesya Povh	100 m	Bye		11.39	3 q	11.29	8	did not advance	
Khrystyna Stuy	100 m	Bye		11.57	7	did not advance			
Yelyzaveta Bryzhina	200 m	23.28	5	—N/a		did not advance			
Nataliya Pohrebnyak	200 m	22.64	2 Q	—N/a		22.81	5	did not advance	
Nataliya Strohova	200 m	23.69	7	—N/a		did not advance			
Olha Bibik	400 m	52.33	5	—N/a		did not advance			
Yuliya Olishevska	400 m	52.45	4	—N/a		did not advance			
Olha Zemlyak	400 m	51.40	2 Q	—N/a		50.75	3 q	51.24	7
Nataliya Lupu	800 m	1:59.91	2 Q	—N/a		2:02.10	8	did not advance	
Olha Lyakhova	800 m	2:03.02	6	—N/a		did not advance			
Nataliya Pryshchepa	800 m	1:59.80	3 q	—N/a		1:59.95	4	did not advance	
Hanna Platitsyna	100 m hurdles	13.12	7	—N/a		did not advance			
Oksana Shkurat	100 m hurdles	13.22	7	—N/a		did not advance			
Olena Yanovska	100 m hurdles	13.32	7	—N/a		did not advance			
Olena Kolesnichenko	400 m hurdles	56.61	3 Q	—N/a		56.77	8	did not advance	
Hanna Titimets	400 m hurdles	56.24	3 Q	—N/a		55.27	4	did not advance	
Viktoriya Tkachuk	400 m hurdles	56.14	2 Q	—N/a		56.87	8	did not advance	
Mariya Shatalova	3000 m steeplechase	9:30.89	16	—N/a				did not advance	
Yelyzaveta Bryzhina; Nataliya Pohrebnyak; Olesya Povh; Mariya Ryemyen; Nataliya Strohova; Khrystyna Stuy	4 × 100 m relay	42.49	3 Q	—N/a				42.36	6
Olha Bibik; Alina Lohvynenko; Olha Lyakhova; Tetyana Melnyk; Yuliya Olishevska; Olha Zemlyak	4 × 400 m relay	3:24.54	2 Q	—N/a				3:26.64	5
Olha Kotovska	Marathon	—N/a						2:34.57	33
Samunnati Lehonkova	Marathon	—N/a						2:46.08	87
Svitlana Stanko	Marathon	—N/a						2:44.26	66
Nadiya Borovska	20 km walk	—N/a						1:33:01	19
Inna Kashyna	20 km walk	—N/a						1:33:15	21
Valentyna Myronchuk	20 km walk	—N/a						1:38:20	46

Field events
Men

Athlete	Event	Qualification		Final	
Athlete	Event	Distance	Position	Distance	Position
Bohdan Bondarenko	High jump	2.29	=1 q	2.33	3rd place, bronze medalist(s)
Andriy Protsenko	High jump	2.29	=7 q	2.33	=4
Dmytro Yakovenko	High jump	2.26	20	did not advance	
Mykyta Nesterenko	Discus throw	60.31	23	did not advance	
Oleksiy Semenov	Discus throw	55.35	32	did not advance	
Dmytro Kosynskyy	Javelin throw	83.23	8 Q	83.95	5
Yevhen Vynohradov	Hammer throw	73.95	11 q	74.11	11

Women

Athlete	Event	Qualification		Final	
Athlete	Event	Distance	Position	Distance	Position
Maryna Bekh	Long jump	6.55	10 q	NM	—
Anna Kornuta	Long jump	6.37	19	did not advance	
Anna Lunyova	Long jump	6.15	31	did not advance	
Olha Saladuha	Triple jump	13.97	18	did not advance	
Ruslana Tsykhotska	Triple jump	13.63	26	did not advance	
Iryna Herashchenko	High jump	1.94	13 Q	1.93	=10
Yuliya Levchenko	High jump	1.92	19	did not advance	
Oksana Okuneva	High jump	1.89	22	did not advance	
Maryna Kylypko	Pole vault	4.55	14	did not advance	
Olha Holodna	Shot put	16.83	27	did not advance	
Halyna Obleshchuk	Shot put	15.81	34	did not advance	
Natalia Semenova	Discus throw	58.41	15	did not advance	
Kateryna Derun	Javelin throw	60.02	17	did not advance	
Hanna Hatsko	Javelin throw	58.90	19	did not advance	
Iryna Klymets	Hammer throw	62.75	28	did not advance	
Iryna Novozhylova	Hammer throw	66.70	22	did not advance	
Nataliya Zolotukhina	Hammer throw	56.96	31	did not advance	

Combined events – Men's decathlon

Athlete	Event	100 m	LJ	SP	HJ	400 m	110H	DT	PV	JT	1500 m	Final	Rank
Oleksiy Kasyanov	Result	10.78	7.54	14.50	2.01	48.56	14.34	NM	DNS	—	—	DNF	
Oleksiy Kasyanov	Points	910	945	759	813	882	931	0	0	—	—	DNF	

Combined events – Women's heptathlon

Athlete	Event	100H	HJ	SP	200 m	LJ	JT	800 m	Final	Rank
Alina Fyodorova	Result	14.10	1.80	14.38	25.44	6.00	35.44	DNF	5038	28
Alina Fyodorova	Points	964	978	820	847	850	580	0	5038	28
Hanna Kasyanova	Result	13.66	1.77	13.25	24.60	5.88	39.10	2:16.58	5951	25
Hanna Kasyanova	Points	1027	941	744	924	813	631	871	5951	25

== Badminton ==
Ukraine qualified two badminton players for each of the following events into the Olympic tournament. Artem Pochtarev and Marija Ulitina were selected among the top 34 individual shuttlers each in the men's and women's singles based on the BWF World Rankings as of 5 May 2016.

Athlete	Event	Group Stage			Elimination	Quarterfinal	Semifinal	Final / BM	
Athlete	Event	Opposition Score	Opposition Score	Rank	Opposition Score	Opposition Score	Opposition Score	Opposition Score	Rank
Artem Pochtarev	Men's singles	Son W-h (KOR); L 9–21, 15–21	Maliekal (RSA); L 18–21, 19–21	3	did not advance				
Marija Ulitina	Women's singles	Nehwal (IND); W 21–18, 21–19	Vicente (BRA); W 21–13, 21–13	1 Q	Buranaprasertsuk (THA); L 14–21, 16–21	did not advance			

== Boxing ==
Ukraine entered five boxers to compete in each of the following weight classes into the Olympic boxing tournament. With the top seed Nicola Adams of Great Britain advancing to the semifinals at the World Championships, Tetyana Kob earned an Olympic spot as a result of her third-place finish at the 2016 European Qualification Tournament in Samsun, Turkey.

On June 16, 2016, Dmytro Mytrofanov received a spare Olympic berth as the next highest-ranked boxer, not yet qualified, in the middleweight division of the AIBA Pro Boxing Rankings, after Turkey's Adem Kılıççı was suspended for failing the re-tested doping sample on steroids from London 2012.

Bantamweight boxer Mykola Butsenko secured an additional Olympic spot with his quarterfinal triumph at the 2016 AIBA World Qualifying Tournament in Baku, Azerbaijan, while Volodymyr Matviichuk and Denys Solonenko rounded out the Ukrainian roster at the 2016 APB and WSB Olympic Qualifier in Vargas, Venezuela.

Athlete	Event	Round of 32	Round of 16	Quarterfinals	Semifinals	Final	
Athlete	Event	Opposition Result	Opposition Result	Opposition Result	Opposition Result	Opposition Result	Rank
Mykola Butsenko	Men's bantamweight	Hamout (MAR); L 0–3	did not advance				
Volodymyr Matviichuk	Men's light welterweight	Sotomayor (AZE); L 0–3	did not advance				
Dmytro Mytrofanov	Men's middleweight	Assomo (FRA); L 0–3	did not advance				
Denys Solonenko	Men's light heavyweight	Mammadov (AZE); L 0–3	did not advance				
Tetyana Kob	Women's flyweight	—N/a	Petrova (BUL); W 2–1	Adams (GBR); L 0–3	did not advance		

== Canoeing ==
=== Slalom ===
Ukraine qualified one canoeist in the women's K-1 class by obtaining a top finish at the 2016 European Canoe Slalom Championships in Liptovský Mikuláš, Slovakia.

Athlete	Event	Preliminary						Semifinal		Final	
Athlete	Event	Run 1	Rank	Run 2	Rank	Best	Rank	Time	Rank	Time	Rank
Viktoriia Us	Women's K-1	109.77	10	109.92	13	109.77	15 Q	1:51.12	12	did not advance	

=== Sprint ===
Ukrainian canoeists qualified a total of three boats in each of the following distances for the Games through the 2015 ICF Canoe Sprint World Championships.

Eight sprint canoeists (four per gender) were selected to the Ukrainian roster for the Games, with Iurii Cheban looking to defend his Olympic title in the men's C-1 200 metres.

Men

Athlete	Event	Heats		Semifinals		Final	
Athlete	Event	Time	Rank	Time	Rank	Time	Rank
Pavlo Altukhov	C-1 1000 m	4:19.361	4 Q	3:58.574	2 FA	4:01.587	4
Iurii Cheban	C-1 200 m	41.220	3 Q	40.590	3 FA	39.279 OB	1st place, gold medalist(s)
Dmytro Ianchuk; Taras Mishchuk	C-2 1000 m	3:35.284	2 Q	3:38.384	1 FA	3:45.99	3rd place, bronze medalist(s)

Women

Athlete	Event	Heats		Semifinals		Final	
Athlete	Event	Time	Rank	Time	Rank	Time	Rank
Mariya Povkh	K-1 500 m	1:54.247	3 Q	2:00.714	6	did not advance	
Inna Hryshchun; Anastasiia Todorova	K-2 500 m	1:43.967	3 Q	1:43.363	2 FA	1:45.868	4
Svitlana Akhadova; Inna Hryshchun; Mariya Povkh; Anastasiia Todorova	K-4 500 m	1:31.727	2 Q	1:35.512	2 FA	1:16.925	4

Qualification Legend: FA = Qualify to final (medal); FB = Qualify to final B (non-medal)

== Cycling ==
=== Road ===
Ukrainian riders qualified for the following quota places in the men's and women's Olympic road race by virtue of their top 15 final national ranking in the 2015 UCI Europe Tour (for men) and top 22 in the 2016 UCI World Ranking (for women).

Athlete	Event	Time	Rank
Andriy Hrivko	Men's road race	6:23:23	41
Andriy Hrivko	Men's time trial	1:16:33.24	18
Denys Kostyuk	Men's road race	did not finish	
Andriy Khripta	Men's road race	did not finish	
Hanna Solovey	Women's road race	4:01:02	36
Hanna Solovey	Women's time trial	48:03.35	20

=== Track ===
Following the completion of the 2016 UCI Track Cycling World Championships, Ukraine entered one rider to compete only in the Olympics, by virtue of her final individual UCI Olympic ranking in that event.

Keirin

Athlete	Event	1st Round	Repechage	2nd Round	Final
Athlete	Event	Rank	Rank	Rank	Rank
Lyubov Basova	Women's keirin	REL R	1 Q	3 Q	5

=== Mountain biking ===
Ukrainian mountain bikers qualified for two women's quota places into the Olympic cross-country race, as a result of the nation's eighth-place finish in the UCI Olympic Ranking List of May 25, 2016.

Athlete	Event	Time	Rank
Yana Belomoyna	Women's cross-country	1:33:28	9
Iryna Popova	Women's cross-country	1:41:29	30

== Diving ==
Ukrainian divers qualified for the following individual spots and synchronized teams at the Olympics through the 2015 FINA World Championships and the 2016 FINA World Cup series.

Men

Athlete	Event	Preliminaries		Semifinals		Final	
Athlete	Event	Points	Rank	Points	Rank	Points	Rank
Illya Kvasha	3 m springboard	398.20	15 Q	430.05	8 Q	475.10	6
Maksym Dolhov; Oleksandr Horshkovozov	10 m synchronized platform	—N/a				421.98	6

Women

Athlete	Event	Preliminaries		Semifinals		Final	
Athlete	Event	Points	Rank	Points	Rank	Points	Rank
Olena Fedorova	3 m springboard	318.10	10 Q	321.00	8 Q	304.80	11
Anastasiia Nedobiga	3 m springboard	309.50	12 Q	290.15	18	did not advance	
Hanna Krasnoshlyk	10 m platform	300.80	14 Q	295.45	16	did not advance	
Yulia Prokopchuk	10 m platform	297.95	15 Q	300.65	14	did not advance	

== Equestrian ==
Ukraine fielded a squad of four jumping riders into the Olympic equestrian competition by virtue of a top national finish from Central & Eastern Europe at the FEI qualification event in Šamorín, Slovakia. One dressage rider was added to the squad by virtue of a top six finish outside the group selection in the individual FEI Olympic Rankings.

=== Dressage ===
Athlete	Horse	Event	Grand Prix		Grand Prix Special		Grand Prix Freestyle		Overall	
Athlete	Horse	Event	Score	Rank	Score	Rank	Technical	Artistic	Score	Rank
Inna Logutenkova	Don Gregorius	Individual	68.943	41	did not advance					

=== Jumping ===
Athlete	Horse	Event	Qualification								Final					Total	
Athlete	Horse	Event	Round 1		Round 2			Round 3			Round A		Round B			Total	
Athlete	Horse	Event	Penalties	Rank	Penalties	Total	Rank	Penalties	Total	Rank	Penalties	Rank	Penalties	Total	Rank	Penalties	Rank
Ulrich Kirchhoff	Prince de la Mare	Individual	4	=27 Q	4	8	=30 Q	17	25	43	did not advance						
Cassio Rivetti	Fine Fleur du Marais	Individual	47 #	=68 ^{TO}	DSQ			did not advance									
Ferenc Szentirmai	Chadino	Individual	47	=68 ^{TO}	9	TO		did not advance									
René Tebbel	Zipper	Individual	0	=1 Q	1	1	=12 Q	2	3	6 Q	1	=14 Q	5	6	19	6	19
Ulrich Kirchhoff; Cassio Rivetti; Ferenc Szentirmai; René Tebbel	See above	Team	51	15	14	—N/a	=13	did not advance			—N/a					14	=13

"TO" indicates that the rider only qualified for the team competition. "#" indicates that the score of this rider does not count in the team competition, since only the best three results of a team are counted.

== Fencing ==
Ukrainian fencers qualified a full squad each in the men's team épée and women's team sabre by virtue of their top 4 national finish in the FIE Olympic Team Rankings, while the women's épée team claimed the spot as the highest ranking team from Europe outside the world's top four. Meanwhile, sabre fencer Andriy Yahodka claimed his Olympic spot by finishing among the top four individuals at the European Zonal Qualifier in Prague, Czech Republic.

The full Ukrainian fencing team, led by London 2012 épée champion Yana Shemyakina and sabre bronze medalist Olha Kharlan, was named on July 5, 2016. Olha Leleiko received a spare berth freed up by Israel to compete in the women's foil as the next highest-ranked fencer, not yet qualified, at the European Zonal Qualifier in Prague, before she was added to the nation's fencing team on July 25, 2016.

Men

Athlete	Event	Round of 64	Round of 32	Round of 16	Quarterfinal	Semifinal	Final / BM	
Athlete	Event	Opposition Score	Opposition Score	Opposition Score	Opposition Score	Opposition Score	Opposition Score	Rank
Anatoliy Herey	Épée	Bye	Kauter (SUI); L 9–15	did not advance				
Dmytro Karyuchenko	Épée	Rodríguez (COL); L 7–15	did not advance					
Bohdan Nikishyn	Épée	Bye	Jiao Yl (CHN); W 15–11	Steffen (SUI); L 14–15	did not advance			
Anatoliy Herey; Dmytro Karyuchenko; Maksym Khvorost; Bohdan Nikishyn	Team épée	—N/a		Bye	Russia; W 45–32	Italy; L 33–45	Hungary; L 37–39	4
Andriy Yahodka	Sabre	—N/a	Abedini (IRI); L 9–15	did not advance				

Women

Athlete	Event	Round of 64	Round of 32	Round of 16	Quarterfinal	Semifinal	Final / BM	
Athlete	Event	Opposition Score	Opposition Score	Opposition Score	Opposition Score	Opposition Score	Opposition Score	Rank
Olena Kryvytska	Épée	Bye	Shin A-l (KOR); W 15–14	Rembi (FRA); L 7–9	did not advance			
Kseniya Pantelyeyeva	Épée	Bye	Embrich (EST); L 3–15	did not advance				
Yana Shemyakina	Épée	Bye	Hurley (USA); W 14–13	Nakano (JPN); L 8–11	did not advance			
Olena Kryvytska; Kseniya Pantelyeyeva; Anfisa Pochkalova; Yana Shemyakina	Team épée	—N/a		Brazil; W 45–32	China; L 42–34	Classification semi-final South Korea; L 34–45	7th place match France; L 38–45	8
Olha Leleiko	Foil	Bye	Guyart (FRA); L 9–15	did not advance				
Olha Kharlan	Sabre	Bye	González (MEX); W 15–8	Komashchuk (UKR); W 15–8	Gulotta (ITA); W 15–4	Egorian (RUS); L 9–15	Brunet (FRA); W 15–10	3rd place, bronze medalist(s)
Alina Komashchuk	Sabre	Bye	Gregorio (ITA); W 15–14	Kharlan (UKR); L 8–15	did not advance			
Olena Kravatska	Sabre	Bye	Muhammad (USA); L 13–15	did not advance				
Olha Kharlan; Alina Komashchuk; Olena Kravatska; Olena Voronina	Team sabre	—N/a			South Korea; W 45–40	Italy; W 45–42	Russia; L 30–45	2nd place, silver medalist(s)

== Gymnastics ==
=== Artistic ===
Ukraine fielded a full team of six artistic gymnasts (five men and one woman) into the Olympic competition. The men's squad claimed one of the remaining four spots in the team all-around, while Angelina Kysla accepted the Olympic berth as a lone Ukrainian female gymnast in the apparatus and individual all-around events at the Olympic Test Event in Rio de Janeiro.

Men
Team

Athlete	Event	Qualification								Final							
Athlete	Event	Apparatus						Total	Rank	Apparatus						Total	Rank
Athlete	Event	F	PH	R	V	PB	HB	Total	Rank	F	PH	R	V	PB	HB	Total	Rank
Vladyslav Hryko	Team	13.666	13.766	13.700	—N/a	14.500	13.666	—N/a		13.166	12.666	13.866	14.241	14.666	13.700	—N/a	
Igor Radivilov	Team	13.666	—N/a	15.308 Q	15.433 Q	—N/a	13.500	—N/a		14.600	—N/a	15.433	15.333	—N/a	13.300	—N/a	
Maksym Semiankiv	Team	14.200	13.700	13.666	13.633	13.300	14.566	83.065	39	DNS	—N/a	DNS	—N/a	DNS		—N/a	
Andriy Sienichkin	Team	—N/a	14.533	—N/a	14.400	12.766	—N/a			—N/a	15.333	—N/a	14.441	—N/a		—N/a	
Oleg Verniaiev	Team	14.833	15.566 Q	15.200	15.066 Q	16.166 Q	15.133 Q	91.964	1 Q	—N/a	15.633	—N/a		15.900	—N/a	—N/a	
Total	Team	42.699	43.865	44.208	44.849	43.966	43.365	263.002	7 Q	27.766	43.632	29.299	44.015	30.366	27.000	202.078	8

Individual finals

Athlete	Event	Apparatus						Total	Rank
Athlete	Event	F	PH	R	V	PB	HB	Total	Rank
Igor Radivilov	Rings	—N/a		15.466	—N/a			15.466	5
Igor Radivilov	Vault	—N/a			15.033	—N/a		15.033	8
Oleg Verniaiev	All-around	15.033	15.533	15.300	15.500	16.100	14.800	92.266	2nd place, silver medalist(s)
Oleg Verniaiev	Pommel horse	—N/a	12.400	—N/a				12.400	8
Oleg Verniaiev	Vault	—N/a			15.316	—N/a		15.316	5
Oleg Verniaiev	Parallel bars	—N/a				16.041	—N/a	16.041	1st place, gold medalist(s)
Oleg Verniaiev	Horizontal bar	—N/a					13.366	13.366	8

Women

Athlete	Event	Qualification						Final					
Athlete	Event	Apparatus				Total	Rank	Apparatus				Total	Rank
Athlete	Event	V	UB	BB	F	Total	Rank	V	UB	BB	F	Total	Rank
Angelina Kysla	Uneven bars	—N/a	12.533	—N/a		12.533	68	did not advance					
Angelina Kysla	Balance beam	—N/a		12.666	—N/a	12.666	69	did not advance					
Angelina Kysla	Floor	—N/a			13.066	13.066	56	did not advance					

=== Rhythmic ===
Ukraine qualified a squad of rhythmic gymnasts for the individual and group all-around by finishing in the top 15 (for individual) and top 10 (for group) at the 2015 World Championships in Stuttgart, Germany.

Athlete	Event	Qualification						Final					
Athlete	Event	Hoop	Ball	Clubs	Ribbon	Total	Rank	Hoop	Ball	Clubs	Ribbon	Total	Rank
Hanna Rizatdinova	Individual	18.400	18.566	18.466	18.500	73.932	3 Q	18.200	18.450	18.450	18.483	73.583	3rd place, bronze medalist(s)

Athlete	Event	Qualification				Final			
Athlete	Event	5 ribbons	3 clubs 2 hoops	Total	Rank	5 ribbons	3 clubs 2 hoops	Total	Rank
Olena Dmytrash; Yevgeniya Gomon; Oleksandra Gridasova; Valeriia Gudym; Anastasiya Voznyak	Team	16.950	16.866	33.816	8 Q	16.866	17.416	34.282	7

=== Trampoline ===
Ukraine qualified one gymnast in the women's trampoline by virtue of a top six finish at the 2016 Olympic Test Event in Rio de Janeiro.

Athlete	Event	Qualification		Final	
Athlete	Event	Score	Rank	Score	Rank
Nataliia Moskvina	Women's	63.300	16	did not advance	

== Judo ==
Ukraine qualified a total of seven judokas for each of the following weight classes at the Games. Six of them (three per gender), highlighted by London 2012 Olympians Georgii Zantaraia and Artem Bloshenko, were ranked among the top 14 eligible judokas for women in the IJF World Ranking List of May 30, 2016, while Quedjau Nhabali at men's middleweight (70 kg) earned a continental quota spot from the European region, as the highest-ranked Ukrainian judoka outside of direct qualifying position. The judo team was named to the Olympic roster on June 1, 2016.

Men

Athlete	Event	Round of 64	Round of 32	Round of 16	Quarterfinals	Semifinals	Repechage	Final / BM	
Athlete	Event	Opposition Result	Opposition Result	Opposition Result	Opposition Result	Opposition Result	Opposition Result	Opposition Result	Rank
Georgii Zantaraia	−66 kg	Bye	Oleinic (POR); L 000–001	did not advance					
Quedjau Nhabali	−90 kg	Bye	González (CUB); L 000–101	did not advance					
Artem Bloshenko	−100 kg	Kurbonov (UZB); W 100–000	Shah (PAK); W 100–000	Cho G-h (KOR); W 100–000	Frey (GER); W 011–000	Gasimov (AZE); L 000–100	Bye	Haga (JPN); L 000–100	5
Iakiv Khammo	+100 kg	—N/a	Sidibe (BUR); W 100–000	Krakovetskii (KGZ); L 000–111	did not advance				

Women

Athlete	Event	Round of 32	Round of 16	Quarterfinals	Semifinals	Repechage	Final / BM	
Athlete	Event	Opposition Result	Opposition Result	Opposition Result	Opposition Result	Opposition Result	Opposition Result	Rank
Maryna Cherniak	−48 kg	Rishony (ISR); W 100–000	Csernoviczki (HUN); L 000–003	did not advance				
Viktoriya Turks	−78 kg	Bye	Velenšek (SLO); L 000–001	did not advance				
Svitlana Iaromka	+78 kg	Bye	Savelkouls (NED); L 000–101	did not advance				

== Modern pentathlon ==
Ukrainian athletes qualified for the following spots to compete in modern pentathlon. Andriy Fedechko and 2012 Olympian Pavlo Tymoshchenko secured a selection in the men's event by filling in two out of the three Olympic quota places at the 2015 World Championships, while Anastasiya Spas added a spot in the women's event to the roster through the European Championships.

Athlete	Event	Fencing (épée one touch)				Swimming (200 m freestyle)			Riding (show jumping)			Combined: shooting/running (10 m air pistol)/(3200 m)			Total points	Final rank
Athlete	Event	RR	BR	Rank	MP points	Time	Rank	MP points	Penalties	Rank	MP points	Time	Rank	MP Points	Total points	Final rank
Andriy Fedechko	Men's	16–19	2	24	198	2:05.63	25	324	25	24	275	11:47.68	26	593	1390	26
Pavlo Tymoshchenko	Men's	21–14	1	6	227	2:05.59	24	324	14	16	286	11:05.74	5	635	1472	2nd place, silver medalist(s)
Anastasiya Spas	Women's	16–19	0	24	196	2:14.54	11	297	79	30	221	15:16.82	36	384	1098	30

== Rowing ==
Ukraine qualified two boats for each of the following rowing classes into the Olympic regatta. One rowing crew confirmed an Olympic place for their boat in the men's quadruple sculls at the 2015 FISA World Championships in Lac d'Aiguebelette, France, while the rowers competing in the women's quadruple sculls were added to the Ukrainian roster with their top two finish at the 2016 European & Final Qualification Regatta in Lucerne, Switzerland.

Eight rowers (four per gender) were selected to the Ukrainian roster for the Games, with Anastasiya Kozhenkova looking to defend the Olympic title with the women's quadruple sculls crew (Buryak, Nimchenko, & Verkhogliad).

Athlete	Event	Heats		Repechage		Final	
Athlete	Event	Time	Rank	Time	Rank	Time	Rank
Ivan Dovgodko; Dmytro Mikhay; Artem Morozov; Oleksandr Nadtoka	Men's quadruple sculls	5:52.90	2 FA	Bye		6:16.30	6
Olena Buryak; Anastasiya Kozhenkova; Ievgeniia Nimchenko; Daryna Verkhohliad	Women's quadruple sculls	6:35.48	1 FA	Bye		6:56.09	4

Qualification Legend: FA=Final A (medal); FB=Final B (non-medal); FC=Final C (non-medal); FD=Final D (non-medal); FE=Final E (non-medal); FF=Final F (non-medal); SA/B=Semifinals A/B; SC/D=Semifinals C/D; SE/F=Semifinals E/F; QF=Quarterfinals; R=Repechage

== Sailing ==
Ukrainian sailors qualified one boat in each of the following classes through the individual fleet World Championships, and European qualifying regattas.

Athlete	Event	Race													Net points	Final rank
Athlete	Event	1	2	3	4	5	6	7	8	9	10	11	12	M*	Net points	Final rank
Oleksandr Tugaryev	Men's RS:X	22	31	33	11	~~DNF~~	12	13	16	30	20	30	13	EL	225	23
Pavlo Matsuyev; Borys Shvets	Men's 470	16	13	21	24	~~25~~	17	25	24	25	19	—N/a		EL	184	25

M = Medal race; EL = Eliminated – did not advance into the medal race

== Shooting ==
Ukrainian shooters achieved quota places for the following events by virtue of their best finishes at the 2014 and 2015 ISSF World Championships, the 2015 ISSF World Cup series, and European Championships or Games, as long as they obtained a minimum qualifying score (MQS) by March 31, 2016.

Men

Athlete	Event	Qualification		Semifinal		Final	
Athlete	Event	Points	Rank	Points	Rank	Points	Rank
Roman Bondaruk	25 m rapid fire pistol	579	11	—N/a		did not advance	
Pavlo Korostylov	10 m air pistol	572	35	—N/a		did not advance	
Pavlo Korostylov	25 m rapid fire pistol	574	16	—N/a		did not advance	
Serhiy Kulish	10 m air rifle	327.0	4 Q	—N/a		204.6	2nd place, silver medalist(s)
Serhiy Kulish	50 m rifle prone	620.5	32	—N/a		did not advance	
Serhiy Kulish	50 m rifle 3 positions	1171	14	—N/a		did not advance	
Mykola Milchev	Skeet	122	4 Q	15	3 q	14	4
Oleh Omelchuk	10 m air pistol	577	14	—N/a		did not advance	
Oleh Omelchuk	50 m pistol	550	21	—N/a		did not advance	
Oleh Tsarkov	10 m air rifle	626.2	5 Q	—N/a		79.7	8
Oleh Tsarkov	50 m rifle prone	623.1	12	—N/a		did not advance	
Oleh Tsarkov	50 m rifle 3 positions	1172	10	—N/a		did not advance	

Women

Athlete	Event	Qualification		Semifinal		Final	
Athlete	Event	Points	Rank	Points	Rank	Points	Rank
Natallia Kalnysh	10 m air rifle	415.8	9	—N/a		did not advance	
Natallia Kalnysh	50 m rifle 3 positions	577	21	—N/a		did not advance	
Olena Kostevych	10 m air pistol	378	28	—N/a		did not advance	
Olena Kostevych	25 m pistol	575	22	did not advance			

Qualification Legend: Q = Qualify for the next round; q = Qualify for the bronze medal (shotgun)

== Swimming ==
Ukrainian swimmers achieved qualifying standards in the following events (up to a maximum of 2 swimmers in each event at the Olympic Qualifying Time (OQT), and potentially 1 at the Olympic Selection Time (OST)):

Men

Athlete	Event	Heat		Semifinal		Final	
Athlete	Event	Time	Rank	Time	Rank	Time	Rank
Serhiy Frolov	1500 m freestyle	15:04.61	17	—N/a		did not advance	
Andriy Hovorov	50 m freestyle	21.49 NR	1 Q	21.46 NR	2 Q	21.74	5
Liubomyr Lemeshko	100 m butterfly	52.51	23	did not advance			
Dmytro Oseledets	200 m breaststroke	2:15.19	37	did not advance			
Mykhailo Romanchuk	1500 m freestyle	15:01.35	15	—N/a		did not advance	

Women

Athlete	Event	Heat		Semifinal		Final	
Athlete	Event	Time	Rank	Time	Rank	Time	Rank
Darya Stepanyuk	50 m freestyle	25.67	42	did not advance			
Darya Stepanyuk	100 m butterfly	1:00.81	33	did not advance			
Daryna Zevina	200 m backstroke	2:08.88	8 Q	2:09.07	9	did not advance	

== Synchronized swimming ==
For the first time in Olympic history, Ukraine fielded a squad of nine synchronized swimmers to compete in both the women's team and duet routine by virtue of their first-place finish at the FINA Olympic test event in Rio de Janeiro.

Athlete	Event	Technical routine		Free routine (preliminary)			Free routine (final)		
Athlete	Event	Points	Rank	Points	Total (technical + free)	Rank	Points	Total (technical + free)	Rank
Lolita Ananasova; Anna Voloshyna	Duet	93.1358	3	93.5333	186.6691	4 Q	94.0000	187.1358	4
Lolita Ananasova; Olena Grechykhina; Oleksandra Sabada; Kateryna Sadurska; Anastasiya Savchuk; Kseniya Sydorenko; Anna Voloshyna; Daria Iushko; Olha Zolotarova	Team	93.4413	4	—N/a			95.1667	188.6080	4

== Table tennis ==
Ukraine entered three athletes into the table tennis competition at the Games. 2008 Olympian and 2015 European Games bronze medalist Kou Lei secured one of the remaining Olympic spots in the men's singles by winning the repechage play-off match at the European Qualification Tournament in Halmstad, Sweden.

Two-time Olympian Tetyana Bilenko was automatically selected among the top 22 eligible players to confirm her third Olympic appearance in the women's singles. Margaryta Pesotska was originally granted an invitation from ITTF to compete in the same event as one of the next seven highest-ranked eligible players, not yet qualified, on the Olympic Ranking List, but later withdrew from the Games due to injury.

Athlete	Event	Preliminary	Round 1	Round 2	Round 3	Round of 16	Quarterfinals	Semifinals	Final / BM	
Athlete	Event	Opposition Result	Opposition Result	Opposition Result	Opposition Result	Opposition Result	Opposition Result	Opposition Result	Opposition Result	Rank
Kou Lei	Men's singles	Bye		O Assar (EGY); W 4–3	Gauzy (FRA); W 4–1	Freitas (POR); L 0–4	did not advance			
Tetyana Bilenko	Women's singles	Bye		Vacenovská (CZE); W 4–0	Lee H C (HKG); L 1–4	did not advance				

== Tennis ==
Ukraine entered seven tennis players (three men and four women) into the Olympic tournament. Rookies Illya Marchenko (world no. 73), Elina Svitolina (world no. 19), and Lesia Tsurenko (world no. 44) qualified directly among the top 56 eligible players in their respective singles events based on the ATP and WTA World Rankings as of June 6, 2016.

Having been directly entered to the singles, Marchenko and Svitolina also opted to play with their partners Denys Molchanov and Olga Savchuk, respectively, in the doubles tournament, while sisters Lyudmyla and Nadiia Kichenok claimed one of eight ITF Olympic women's doubles places, as Ukraine's top-ranked tennis pair outside of direct qualifying position.

Lesia Tsurenko withdrew from the Games before the opening match for health reasons.

Men

Athlete	Event	Round of 64	Round of 32	Round of 16	Quarterfinals	Semifinals	Final / BM	
Athlete	Event	Opposition Score	Opposition Score	Opposition Score	Opposition Score	Opposition Score	Opposition Score	Rank
Illya Marchenko	Singles	Seppi (ITA); L 3–6, 6–3, 6–7^{(6–8)}	did not advance					
Illya Marchenko; Denys Molchanov	Doubles	—N/a	Fognini / Seppi (ITA); L 4–6, 3–6	did not advance				

Women

Athlete	Event	Round of 64	Round of 32	Round of 16	Quarterfinals	Semifinals	Final / BM	
Athlete	Event	Opposition Score	Opposition Score	Opposition Score	Opposition Score	Opposition Score	Opposition Score	Rank
Elina Svitolina	Singles	Petkovic (GER); W 2–6, 6–1, 6–3	Watson (GBR); W 6–3, 1–6, 6–3	S Williams (USA); W 6–4, 6–3	Kvitová (CZE); L 2–6, 0–6	did not advance		
Lesia Tsurenko	Singles	Withdrew on 6 August for health reasons						
Lyudmyla Kichenok; Nadiia Kichenok	Doubles	—N/a	Xu Yf / Zheng Ss (CHN); L 0–6, 3–6	did not advance				
Olga Savchuk; Elina Svitolina	Doubles	—N/a	Hlaváčková / Hradecká (CZE); L 6–7^{(1–7)}, 6–1, 4–6	did not advance				

== Triathlon ==
Ukraine entered two triathletes to compete at the Games. Two-time Olympian Yuliya Yelistratova was ranked among the top 40 eligible triathletes in the women's event, while Ivan Ivanov received a spare berth freed up by one of the Germans to compete in the men's event as the next highest-ranked eligible triathlete, not yet qualified, in the ITU Olympic Qualification List as of May 15, 2016.

Athlete	Event	Swim (1.5 km)	Trans 1	Bike (40 km)	Trans 2	Run (10 km)	Total Time	Rank
Ivan Ivanov	Men's	18:58	0:51	1:00:26	0:43	35:02	1:56.00	49
Yuliya Yelistratova	Women's	20:05	0:55	1:05:57	0:39	35:51	2:03:27	38

== Weightlifting ==
Ukrainian weightlifters qualified four men's and four women's quota places for the Rio Olympics based on their combined team standing by points at the 2014 and 2015 IWF World Championships. The team had to allocate these places to individual athletes by June 20, 2016.

On 2 August 2016, Roman Zaitsev withdrew from the Games due to injury. Instead, Ihor Shymechko took over the vacant spot to compete in the men's super heavyweight division (+105 kg).

Men

Athlete	Event	Snatch		Clean & Jerk		Total	Rank
Athlete	Event	Result	Rank	Result	Rank	Total	Rank
Oleksandr Pielieshenko	−85 kg	175	4	210	5	385	5
Dmytro Chumak	−94 kg	174	6	213	6	387	6
Volodymyr Hoza	−94 kg	170	9	205	9	375	9
Ihor Shymechko	+105 kg	170	22	195	19	365	19

Women

Athlete	Event	Snatch		Clean & Jerk		Total	Rank
Athlete	Event	Result	Rank	Result	Rank	Total	Rank
Iulia Paratova	−48 kg	84	4	95	9	179	8
Veronika Ivasiuk	−58 kg	90	9	103	15	193	13
Iryna Dekha	−75 kg	114	4	133	8	247	5
Anastasiya Lysenko	+75 kg	117	=9	146	10	263	10

== Wrestling ==
Ukraine qualified a total of nine wrestlers for each of the following weight classes into the Olympic competition. Five of them finished among the top six to book Olympic spots in the men's freestyle (97 kg), men's Greco-Roman (85, 98, & 130 kg), and women's freestyle (63 kg) at the 2015 World Championships, while two more Olympic berths were awarded to Ukrainian wrestlers, who progressed to the top two finals at the 2016 European Qualification Tournament.

Three further wrestlers claimed the remaining Olympic slots to round out the Ukrainian roster at the final meet of the World Qualification Tournament in Istanbul.

On May 11, 2016, United World Wrestling (UWW) decided to revoke two Olympic licenses from Ukraine in men's freestyle 66 kg and women's freestyle 58 kg, respectively, due to doping violations at the European Qualification Tournament, but these licenses were redistributed back two months later.

Key:
- VT (ranking points: 5–0 or 0–5) – Victory by fall.
- VB (ranking points: 5–0 or 0–5) – Victory by injury (VF for forfeit, VA for withdrawal or disqualification)
- PP (ranking points: 3–1 or 1–3) – Decision by points – the loser with technical points.
- PO (ranking points: 3–0 or 0–3) – Decision by points – the loser without technical points.
- ST (ranking points: 4–0 or 0–4) – Great superiority – the loser without technical points and a margin of victory of at least 8 (Greco-Roman) or 10 (freestyle) points.
- SP (ranking points: 4–1 or 1–4) – Technical superiority – the loser with technical points and a margin of victory of at least 8 (Greco-Roman) or 10 (freestyle) points.

Men's freestyle

Athlete	Event	Qualification	Round of 16	Quarterfinal	Semifinal	Repechage 1	Repechage 2	Final / BM	
Athlete	Event	Opposition Result	Opposition Result	Opposition Result	Opposition Result	Opposition Result	Opposition Result	Opposition Result	Rank
Andriy Kviatkovskyi	−65 kg	Bye	Asgarov (AZE); L 2–12 ^{SP}	did not advance		Bye	Molinaro (USA); L 5–8 ^{PP}	Did not advance	13
Valeriy Andriytsev	−97 kg	Bye	Boltukayev (RUS); W 8–5 ^{PP}	Musaev (KGZ); W 5–2 ^{PP}	Gazyumov (AZE); L 0–11 ^{ST}	Bye		Ibragimov (UZB); L 4–6 ^{PP}	5
Alen Zasyeyev	−125 kg	Makhov (RUS); W 2–2 ^{PP}	Petriashvili (GEO); L 6–11 ^{PP}	did not advance					10

Men's Greco-Roman

Athlete	Event	Qualification	Round of 16	Quarterfinal	Semifinal	Repechage 1	Repechage 2	Final / BM	
Athlete	Event	Opposition Result	Opposition Result	Opposition Result	Opposition Result	Opposition Result	Opposition Result	Opposition Result	Rank
Zhan Beleniuk	−85 kg	Bye	Othman (EGY); W 9–0 ^{ST}	Bayryakov (BUL); W 10–1 ^{SP}	Hamzatau (BLR); W 6–0 ^{PO}	Bye		Chakvetadze (RUS); L 2–9 ^{PP}	2nd place, silver medalist(s)
Dimitriy Timchenko	−98 kg	Kiss (HUN); L 0–3 ^{PP}	did not advance						15
Oleksandr Chernetskyi	−130 kg	Mohamed (EGY); W 9–0 ^{ST}	Kajaia (GEO); L 1–2 ^{VT}	did not advance					9

Women's freestyle

Athlete	Event	Qualification	Round of 16	Quarterfinal	Semifinal	Repechage 1	Repechage 2	Final / BM	
Athlete	Event	Opposition Result	Opposition Result	Opposition Result	Opposition Result	Opposition Result	Opposition Result	Opposition Result	Rank
Yuliya Khavaldzhy	−53 kg	Maroulis (USA); L 1–12 ^{SP}	did not advance			Zhong Xc (CHN); L 1–11 ^{SP}	did not advance		11
Oksana Herhel	−58 kg	Bye	Ratkevich (AZE); L 5–7 ^{PP}	did not advance					13
Yuliya Tkach	−63 kg	Lappage (CAN); W 2–0 ^{VB}	Xu R (CHN); L 1–3 ^{PP}	did not advance					9
Alina Stadnyk	−69 kg	Dosho (JPN); L 2–10 ^{PP}	did not advance			Tosun (TUR); L 4–7 ^{PP}	did not advance		11
Alla Cherkasova	−75 kg	Adar (TUR); L 10–12 ^{PP}	did not advance						11

== See also ==
- Ukraine at the 2016 Summer Paralympics
