= Georgia at the 2016 Summer Olympics =

- Flag of Georgia
- IOC code: GEO
- NOC: Georgian National Olympic Committee
- Website: www.geonoc.org.ge (in Georgian and English)

in Rio de Janeiro
- Competitors: 40 in 12 sports
- Flag bearers: Avtandil Tchrikishvili (opening); Lasha Talakhadze (closing)
- Medals Ranked 38th: Gold 2 Silver 1 Bronze 4 Total 7

Summer Olympics appearances (overview)
- 1996; 2000; 2004; 2008; 2012; 2016; 2020; 2024

Other related appearances
- Russian Empire (1900–1912); Soviet Union (1952–1988); Unified Team (1992)

Georgia competed at the 2016 Summer Olympics in Rio de Janeiro, Brazil, from 5 to 21 August 2016. This was the nation's sixth consecutive appearance at the Summer Olympics in the post-Soviet era.

Georgian National Olympic Committee sent the nation's largest ever delegation to the Games, with 40 athletes, 30 men and 10 women, competing across 12 sports. Among the sporting events represented by the nation's athletes, Georgia marked its Olympic debut in flatwater canoeing, men's tennis, women's judo, and women's weightlifting, as well as its return to fencing after two decades and rhythmic gymnastics after 16 years.

The Georgian roster was merely highlighted by pistol shooting legend and three-time medalist Nino Salukvadze, who set a historic record as the second female athlete to appear at eight Olympics, and also teamed up with her 18-year-old son and fellow shooter Tsotne Machavariani to become the first mother-son tandem competing together at a single edition. Aside from Salukvadze, ten more Georgian athletes had past Olympic experience, with archers Kristine Esebua and Khatuna Narimanidze headed to their fourth Games, and judoka Lasha Shavdatuashvili seeking to add another medal after his golden finish in London four years earlier. Other notable Georgian athletes featured world-ranked rhythmic gymnast Salome Pazhava, freestyle wrestler and 2015 world champion Vladimer Khinchegashvili (men's 57 kg), and European Games judo champion Avtandili Tchrikishvili (men's 81 kg), who was selected to lead his delegation as the flag bearer in the opening ceremony.

Georgia left Rio de Janeiro a total of seven medals (two golds, one silver, and four bronze), which matched its overall tally from the previous Olympics in London. Among the nation's medalists were Shavdatuashvili, who obtained a bronze in the men's 73 kg; his fellow judoka Varlam Liparteliani, who bounced back from his early elimination in London to earn a silver in the men's 90 kg; and Khinchegashvili, who upgraded his silver from the previous Games to a gold in freestyle wrestling. For the first time in Olympic history, two Georgian athletes shared the same podium in any sport, as weightlifter Lasha Talakhadze established a new world record to capture the men's +105 kg title, with his compatriot and London 2012 Olympian Irakli Turmanidze claiming the bronze.

== Medalists ==
Medal	Name	Sport	Event	Date
Gold	Lasha Talakhadze	Weightlifting	Men's +105 kg	16 August
Gold	Vladimer Khinchegashvili	Wrestling	Men's freestyle 57 kg	19 August
Silver	Varlam Liparteliani	Judo	Men's 90 kg	10 August
Bronze	Lasha Shavdatuashvili	Judo	Men's 73 kg	8 August
Bronze	Shmagi Bolkvadze	Wrestling	Men's Greco-Roman 66 kg	16 August
Bronze	Irakli Turmanidze	Weightlifting	Men's +105 kg	16 August
Bronze	Geno Petriashvili	Wrestling	Men's freestyle 125 kg	20 August

== Archery ==
Georgian archers qualified each for the women's events after having secured a top eight finish in the team recurve at the 2015 World Archery Championships in Copenhagen, Denmark.

Athlete	Event	Ranking round		Round of 64	Round of 32	Round of 16	Quarterfinals	Semifinals	Final / BM	
Athlete	Event	Score	Seed	Opposition Score	Opposition Score	Opposition Score	Opposition Score	Opposition Score	Opposition Score	Rank
Kristine Esebua	Women's individual	612	45	Kumari (IND); L 4–6	Did not advance					
Yuliya Lobzhenidze	Women's individual	594	57	Valencia (MEX); L 4–6	Did not advance					
Khatuna Narimanidze	Women's individual	625	34	Sichenikova (UKR); L 1–7	Did not advance					
Kristine Esebua; Yuliya Lobzhenidze; Khatuna Narimanidze	Women's team	1831	12	—		Mexico; L 0–6	Did not advance			

== Athletics ==
Georgian athletes have so far achieved qualifying standards in the following athletics events (up to a maximum of 3 athletes in each event):

Key

- Note–Ranks given for track events are within the athlete's heat only
- Q = Qualified for the next round
- q = Qualified for the next round as a fastest loser or, in field events, by position without achieving the qualifying target
- NR = National record
- N/A = Round not applicable for the event
- Bye = Athlete not required to compete in round

Track & road events

Athlete	Event	Final	
Athlete	Event	Result	Rank
Daviti Kharazishvili	Men's marathon	2:20:47	72

Field events

Athlete	Event	Qualification		Final	
Athlete	Event	Distance	Position	Distance	Position
Benik Abramyan	Men's shot put	18.72	31	Did not advance	
Bachana Khorava	Men's long jump	7.77	19	Did not advance	
Lasha Torgvaidze	Men's triple jump	NM	—	Did not advance	
Valentina Liashenko	Women's high jump	1.80	=32	Did not advance	

== Canoeing ==
=== Sprint ===
Georgia has qualified a single boat in men's C-1 200 m for the Games by virtue of a top two national finish at the 2016 European Qualification Regatta in Duisburg, Germany, signifying the nation's Olympic debut in the sport.

Athlete	Event	Heats		Semifinals		Final	
Athlete	Event	Time	Rank	Time	Rank	Time	Rank
Zaza Nadiradze	Men's C-1 200 m	41.423	4 Q	40.146	1 FA	39.817	5

Qualification Legend: FA = Qualify to final (medal); FB = Qualify to final B (non-medal)

== Fencing ==
Georgia has entered one fencer into the Olympic competition, signifying the nation's sporting comeback for the first time since 1996. Sandro Bazadze had claimed his Olympic spot in the men's sabre by finishing among the top four individuals at the European Zonal Qualifier in Prague, Czech Republic.

Athlete	Event	Round of 32	Round of 16	Quarterfinal	Semifinal	Final / BM	
Athlete	Event	Opposition Score	Opposition Score	Opposition Score	Opposition Score	Opposition Score	Rank
Sandro Bazadze	Men's sabre	Agresta (BRA); W 15–3	Kim J-h (KOR); L 14–15	Did not advance			

== Gymnastics ==
=== Rhythmic ===
Georgia has qualified one rhythmic gymnast for the individual all-around by finishing in the top 15 at the 2015 World Championships in Stuttgart, Germany.

Athlete	Event	Qualification						Final					
Athlete	Event	Hoop	Ball	Clubs	Ribbon	Total	Rank	Hoop	Ball	Clubs	Ribbon	Total	Rank
Salome Pazhava	Individual	17.233	17.783	17.433	16.666	69.115	14	Did not advance					

=== Trampoline ===
Georgia has qualified one gymnast in the women's trampoline by virtue of a top eight finish at the 2015 World Championships in Odense, Denmark.

Athlete	Event	Qualification		Final	
Athlete	Event	Score	Rank	Score	Rank
Luba Golovina	Women's	98.285	8 Q	51.010	7

== Judo ==
Georgia has qualified a total of eight judokas for each of the following weight classes at the Games. All seven men, highlighted by London 2012 champion Lasha Shavdatuashvili and world no. 1 seed Avtandili Tchrikishvili, were ranked among the top 22 eligible judokas in the IJF World Ranking List of 30 May 2016, while Dutch-born Esther Stam at women's middleweight (70 kg) became the nation's first ever female in the sport, earning a continental quota spot from the European region as the highest-ranked Georgian judoka outside of direct qualifying position. The judo team was named to the Olympic roster on 4 June 2016.

Men

Athlete	Event	Round of 64	Round of 32	Round of 16	Quarterfinals	Semifinals	Repechage	Final / BM	
Athlete	Event	Opposition Result	Opposition Result	Opposition Result	Opposition Result	Opposition Result	Opposition Result	Opposition Result	Rank
Amiran Papinashvili	−60 kg	Bye	Pessoa (CAN); W 011–000	Gerchev (BUL); W 000–000 S	Takato (JPN); W 100–000	Mudranov (RUS); L 000–100	Bye	Urozboev (UZB); L 000–001	5
Vazha Margvelashvili	−66 kg	Bye	Gomboč (SLO); L 000–100	Did not advance					
Lasha Shavdatuashvili	−73 kg	Bye	Estrada (CUB); W 100–000	Repiyallage (SRI); W 100–000	Ono (JPN); L 000–010	Did not advance	Iartcev (RUS); W 100–000	Muki (ISR); W 100–000	3rd place, bronze medalist(s)
Avtandili Tchrikishvili	−81 kg	Bye	Silva (CUB); W 001–000	Turcios (ESA); W 001–000	Marconcini (ITA); W 011–000	Stevens (USA); L 000–100	Bye	Nagase (JPN); L 000–001	5
Varlam Liparteliani	−90 kg	Bye	Ustopiriyon (TJK); W 100–000	Uera (NRU); W 100–000	Lkhagvasüren (MGL); W 000–000 S	Gwak D-h (KOR); W 100–000	Bye	Baker (JPN); L 000–001	2nd place, silver medalist(s)
Beka Gviniashvili	−100 kg	Bye	Fletcher (GBR); W 100–000	Nikiforov (BEL); W 101–000	Maret (FRA); L 000–010	Did not advance	Haga (JPN); L 000–000 S	Did not advance	7
Adam Okruashvili	+100 kg	—	Harasawa (JPN); L 000–000 S	Did not advance					

Women

Athlete	Event	Round of 32	Round of 16	Quarterfinals	Semifinals	Repechage	Final / BM	
Athlete	Event	Opposition Result	Opposition Result	Opposition Result	Opposition Result	Opposition Result	Opposition Result	Rank
Esther Stam	−70 kg	Tsend-Ayuush (MGL); W 011–000	Zupancic (CAN); L 000–000 S	Did not advance				

== Shooting ==
Georgian shooters have qualified for the following events by virtue of their best finish at the 2014 ISSF World Shooting Championships, the 2015 ISSF World Cup series, and European Championships or Games, as long as they obtained the minimum qualifying score (MQS) by 31 March 2016.

Going to her eighth straight Olympics, three-time pistol shooting medalist Nino Salukvadze joined her son Tsotne Machavariani to be officially named to the Georgian team, making them the first ever mother-son tandem in history to compete together at the same edition of the Games.

Athlete	Event	Qualification		Semifinal		Final	
Athlete	Event	Points	Rank	Points	Rank	Points	Rank
Tsotne Machavariani	Men's 10 m air pistol	574	29	—		Did not advance	
Tsotne Machavariani	Men's 50 m pistol	552	15	—		Did not advance	
Nino Salukvadze	Women's 10 m air pistol	377	34	—		Did not advance	
Nino Salukvadze	Women's 25 m pistol	584	3 Q	14	6	Did not advance	

Qualification Legend: Q = Qualify for the next round; q = Qualify for the bronze medal (shotgun)

== Swimming ==
Georgia has received a Universality invitation from FINA to send two swimmers (one male and one female) to the Olympics.

Athlete	Event	Heat		Semifinal		Final	
Athlete	Event	Time	Rank	Time	Rank	Time	Rank
Irakli Revishvili	Men's 400 m freestyle	4:00.56	45	—		Did not advance	
Teona Bostashvili	Women's 100 m breaststroke	1:22.91	43	Did not advance			

== Tennis ==
Georgia has claimed one of six ITF Olympic men's singles places to send Nikoloz Basilashvili (world no. 101) in the men's singles into the Olympic tennis tournament.

Athlete	Event	Round of 64	Round of 32	Round of 16	Quarterfinals	Semifinals	Final / BM	
Athlete	Event	Opposition Score	Opposition Score	Opposition Score	Opposition Score	Opposition Score	Opposition Score	Rank
Nikoloz Basilashvili	Men's singles	Cuevas (URU); L 3–6, 7–6^{(10–8)}, 3–6	Did not advance					

== Weightlifting ==
Georgian weightlifters have qualified three men's quota places for the Rio Olympics based on their combined team standing by points at the 2014 and 2015 IWF World Championships. The team must allocate these places to individual athletes by 20 June 2016.

Meanwhile, an unused women's Olympic spot was awarded to the Georgian team by IWF, as a result of Russia's complete ban from the Games due to the "multiple positive cases" of doping.

Athlete	Event	Snatch		Clean & Jerk		Total	Rank
Athlete	Event	Result	Rank	Result	Rank	Total	Rank
Giorgi Chkheidze	Men's −105 kg	170	14	~~208~~	DNF	170	DNF
Lasha Talakhadze	Men's +105 kg	215	2	258	1	473 WR	1st place, gold medalist(s)
Irakli Turmanidze	Men's +105 kg	207	4	241	=4	448	3rd place, bronze medalist(s)
Anastasiia Hotfrid	Women's +75 kg	113	11	135	12	248	12

== Wrestling ==
Georgia has qualified a total of eleven wrestlers for each the following weight classes into the Olympic tournament. Four of them finished among the top six to book Olympic spots in all men's freestyle events (except 65 & 74 kg) at the 2015 World Championships, while four more Olympic berths were awarded to Georgian wrestlers, who progressed to the top two finals at the 2016 European Qualification Tournament.

Three further wrestlers had claimed the remaining Olympic slots to round out the Georgian roster in separate World Qualification Tournaments; one of them in men's Greco-Roman 98 kg at the initial meet in Ulaanbaatar, and two more at the final meet in Istanbul.

Key:

- VT – Victory by Fall.
- PP – Decision by Points – the loser with technical points.
- PO – Decision by Points – the loser without technical points.
- ST – Technical superiority – the loser without technical points and a margin of victory of at least 8 (Greco-Roman) or 10 (freestyle) points.

Men's freestyle

Athlete	Event	Qualification	Round of 16	Quarterfinal	Semifinal	Repechage 1	Repechage 2	Final / BM	
Athlete	Event	Opposition Result	Opposition Result	Opposition Result	Opposition Result	Opposition Result	Opposition Result	Opposition Result	Rank
Vladimer Khinchegashvili	−57 kg	Bye	Sanayev (KAZ); W 3–1 ^{PP}	Aliyev (AZE); W 3–1 ^{PP}	Dubov (BUL); W 3–1 ^{PP}	Bye		Higuchi (JPN); W 3–1 ^{PP}	1st place, gold medalist(s)
Zurabi Iakobishvili	−65 kg	Bye	Daniel (NGR); W 3–1 ^{PP}	Chamizo (ITA); L 1–3 ^{PP}	Did not advance				10
Jakob Makarashvili	−74 kg	Bye	Ivanov (BUL); W 3–1 ^{PP}	Hasanov (AZE); L 0–4 ^{ST}	Did not advance				11
Sandro Aminashvili	−86 kg	Bye	Baranowski (POL); L 1–3 ^{PP}	Did not advance					14
Elizbar Odikadze	−97 kg	Bye	Ketoyev (ARM); W 3–1 ^{PP}	Ibragimov (KAZ); W 3–1 ^{PP}	Snyder (USA); L 1–3 ^{PP}	Bye		Saritov (ROU); L 0–4 ^{ST}	5
Geno Petriashvili	−125 kg	Kumchev (BUL); W 4–0 ^{ST}	Zasyeyev (UKR); W 3–1 ^{PP}	Ghasemi (IRI); L 1–3 ^{PP}	Did not advance	Bye	Jarvis (CAN); W 3–1 ^{PP}	Dlagnev (USA); W 4–0 ^{ST}	3rd place, bronze medalist(s)

Men's Greco-Roman

Athlete	Event	Qualification	Round of 16	Quarterfinal	Semifinal	Repechage 1	Repechage 2	Final / BM	
Athlete	Event	Opposition Result	Opposition Result	Opposition Result	Opposition Result	Opposition Result	Opposition Result	Opposition Result	Rank
Shmagi Bolkvadze	−66 kg	Bye	Välimäki (FIN); W 3–0 ^{PO}	Norouzi (IRI); W 3–0 ^{PO}	Štefanek (SRB); L 0–5 ^{VT}	Bye		Inoue (JPN); W 3–0 ^{PO}	3rd place, bronze medalist(s)
Zurabi Datunashvili	−75 kg	Kartikov (KAZ); L 0–3 ^{PO}	Did not advance						18
Robert Kobliashvili	−85 kg	Leyva (MEX); W 3–0 ^{PO}	Kudla (GER); L 1–3 ^{PP}	Did not advance					9
Revaz Nadareishvili	−98 kg	Bye	Guri (BUL); L 1–3 ^{PP}	Did not advance					10
Iakob Kajaia	−130 kg	Soghomonyan (BRA); W 4–0 ^{ST}	Chernetskyi (UKR); W 5–0 ^{VT}	Semenov (RUS); L 0–3 ^{PO}	Did not advance				7
