= Augello =

Augello is a surname. Notable people with this surname include:

- Alicia Augello Cook (born 1981), known professionally as Alicia Keys, American pluri-awarded singer-songwriter, pianist, and music producer
- Haley Augello, American female freestyle wrestler who competed at the 2016 Summer Olympics
- Tommaso Augello (born 1994), Italian football player
