= Oleh Dovhun =

Ukrainian boxer (born 1994)

Personal information
- Nickname: Ukrainian Pitbull
- Nationality: Ukrainian
- Born: 22 March 1994 (age 32) Stebnyk, Ukraine
- Height: 1.73 m (5 ft 8 in)
- Weight: Super-bantamweight

Boxing career
- Reach: 172 cm (68 in)
- Stance: Southpaw

Boxing record
- Total fights: 15
- Wins: 15
- Win by KO: 5
- Losses: 0

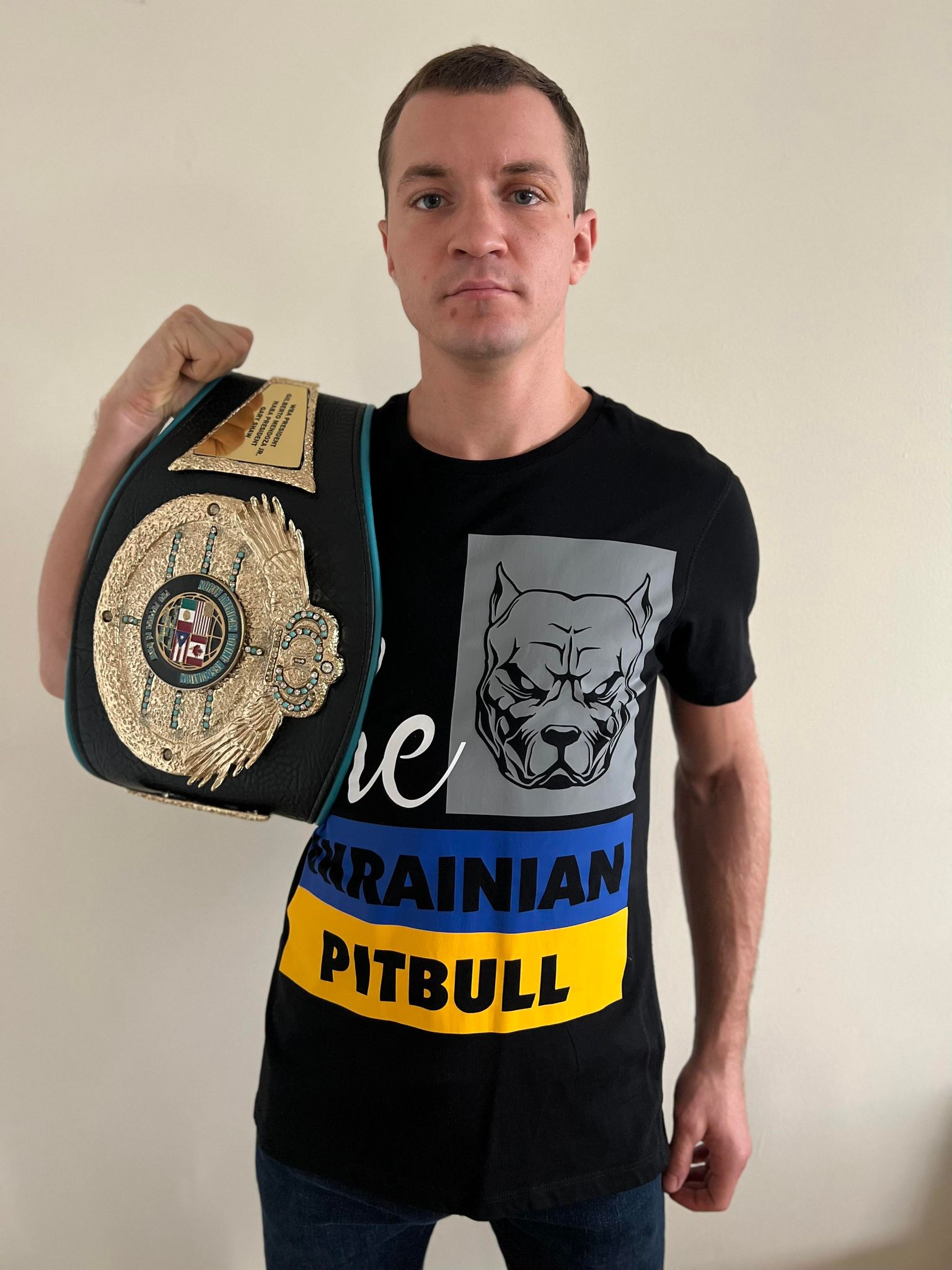
Personal photo of Oleh Dovhun

Oleh Dovhun (born 22 March 1994) is a Ukrainian professional boxer who has held the WBA-NABA super-bantamweight title since November 2021. He #2 in the WBA. He was a member of the national team of Ukraine, Master of Sports of Ukraine of international class, multiple champion and prize-winner of Ukraine, represented Ukraine at the qualifying tournament for the 2016 Olympic Games APB and WSB Olimpic Qualifier.

== Biography ==
He was born and raised in the town of Stebnyk in the Lviv region. He was raised in a Christian family. Father Vasily, mother Lyubov, brother Stepan.

In 2011 he graduated from Stebnyk of School №7, in 2016 he graduated from the Lviv School of Physical Culture, and entered the Lviv State University of Physical Culture.

He became interested in boxing when he was 10 years old and started training under the first coach of Stakhnev Mikhail in his hometown.

When Oleh turned 18, he began training with the Honored Coach of Ukraine Semenishin Roman, and at the age of 23 moved to the United States, where he began his professional career under Michael McSorley and continues to this day.

== Amateur career ==
In 2007 he won the championship of Ukraine in Kerch.

Oleh achieved his first serious achievement in 2008 in Kharkiv at the Championship of Ukraine among schoolchildren, taking first place and in the same year became a member of the national team of Ukraine.

He became the champion of Ukraine in 2009 after winning the right to go to the World Cup in Armenia, but due to health he could not go.

In 2010 he took first place at the Ukrainian championship and in the same year was a participant in the European Championship.

He became the second at the championship of Ukraine in 2012.

In 2013, he won the Class A tournament.

He finished third at the Ukrainian Championship in Kyiv in 2014.

He won the Ukrainian Cup in 2015.

In 2016, he was a participant in the World Boxing Series in the Ukrainian Atamans team, where he won one victory. Thus, he won the right to qualify for the Olympics in Rio de Janeiro in 2016.

In total, he played about 347 amateur fights.

== Professional career ==
He began his professional boxing career in the United States, where he made his debut fight on May 26, 2017 in North Carolina and won the second round of TKO. In the same year he won three more victories.

In 2018 he played three matches and won.

In 2019, Oleh's record was 7-0, after which he had the opportunity to fight for the belt of the American Boxing Federation USA, with another undefeated boxer Daron Williams, where Oleh dominated the whole fight and knocked down the opponent in the second round, winning by a unanimous decision of the judges.

In July of that year, Oleh fought for the ABF Continental Americas belt with Vincent Jennings, where he won. After that, the boxer had three more fights in which he won.

On 13 November 2021, Oleh played the most important 10-round bout of his WBA NABA career against rival Glenn Dezurn. All 10 rounds Oleh dominated and won by unanimous decision of the judges 100-90. Thus, he secured a place in the top 15 of the WBA.
