= Víctor Rodríguez (boxer) =

Venezuelan boxer (born 1995)

Victor Rodríguez
Personal information
- Born: Víctor Julio Rodríguez Villavicencio; 27 March 1995 (age 31) Santa Bárbara del Zulia, Zulia, Venezuela
- Height: 56 kg
- Weight: 167 cm

Boxing career

Víctor Julio Rodríguez Villavicencio (born 27 March 1995) is a Venezuelan boxer. He competed in the men's bantamweight event at the 2016 Summer Olympics, where he was eliminated in the round of 32.
