= Moldova at the 2016 Summer Olympics =

- IOC code: MDA
- NOC: National Olympic Committee of the Republic of Moldova
- Website: www.olympic.md (in Romanian)

in Rio de Janeiro
- Competitors: 23 in 9 sports
- Flag bearer: Nicolae Ceban
- Medals: Gold 0 Silver 0 Bronze 0 Total 0

Summer Olympics appearances (overview)
- 1996; 2000; 2004; 2008; 2012; 2016; 2020; 2024

Other related appearances
- Russian Empire (1900–1912); Romania (1924–1936); Soviet Union (1952–1988); Unified Team (1992)

Moldova, officially the Republic of Moldova, competed at the 2016 Summer Olympics in Rio de Janeiro, Brazil, from 5 to 21 August 2016. This was the nation's sixth consecutive appearance at the Summer Olympics in the post-Soviet era.

The National Olympic Committee of the Republic of Moldova fielded a squad of 23 athletes, 14 men and 9 women, across nine different sports at the Games. Although its full roster was larger by a single athlete than in London four years earlier, this was still one of Moldova's smallest delegations sent to the Olympics. Among the sports represented by the nation's athletes, Moldova made its Olympic debut in taekwondo and tennis, as well as a return to sprint canoeing after two decades.

Of the 23 participants, fifteen of them made their Olympic debut in Rio de Janeiro, including flatwater canoeist Oleg Tarnovschi and his younger brother Serghei, who earned Moldova's first ever gold medal at the Youth Olympics in Nanjing two years earlier. The remaining eight athletes on the Moldovan squad had past Olympic experience, highlighted by hammer thrower Serghei Marghiev and his older sisters Zalina Marghieva and Marina Nichișenco, shot putter Ivan Emilianov, who qualified for his fourth Games as the oldest and most experienced competitor (aged 39), taekwondo fighter Aaron Cook, who transferred his allegiance from Great Britain after controversially failing to make the London Games in 2012, and freestyle wrestler Nicolae Ceban, who reprised his role of leading the Moldovan team for the second time as the flag bearer in the opening ceremony.

Moldova originally left Rio de Janeiro with only a bronze medal won by the younger Tarnovschi in the men's C-1 1000 metres. On 19 August 2016, both the International Olympic Committee and International Canoe Federation (ICF) stripped him of his medal for breaching the anti-doping rules, handing it over to the next highest-ranked canoeist Ilia Shtokalov of Russia.

== Archery ==
One Moldovan archer has qualified for the women's individual recurve at the Olympics by virtue of a top six national finish at the 2016 Archery World Cup meet in Antalya, Turkey.

| Athlete | Event | Ranking round | | Round of 64 | Round of 32 | Round of 16 | Quarterfinals | Semifinals | Final / BM | |
| Athlete | Event | Score | Seed | Opposition Score | Opposition Score | Opposition Score | Opposition Score | Opposition Score | Opposition Score | Rank |
|---|---|---|---|---|---|---|---|---|---|---|
| Alexandra Mîrca | Women's individual | 636 | 27 | Román (MEX); W 6–4 | Wu Jx (CHN); L 0–6 | Did not advance | | | | |

== Athletics ==
Moldovan athletes have so far achieved qualifying standards in the following athletics events (up to a maximum of 3 athletes in each event):

Key

- Note–Ranks given for track events are within the athlete's heat only
- Q = Qualified for the next round
- q = Qualified for the next round as a fastest loser or, in field events, by position without achieving the qualifying target
- NR = National record
- N/A = Round not applicable for the event
- Bye = Athlete not required to compete in round

Track & road events

| Athlete | Event | Final | |
| Athlete | Event | Result | Rank |
|---|---|---|---|
| Roman Prodius | Men's marathon | 2:27:01 | 105 |
| Lilia Fisicovici | Women's marathon | 2:34.05 PB | 27 |

Field events
Men

| Athlete | Event | Qualification | | Final | |
| Athlete | Event | Distance | Position | Distance | Position |
|---|---|---|---|---|---|
| Ivan Emilianov | Shot put | 17.83 | 32 | Did not advance | |
| Vladimir Letnicov | Triple jump | 15.29 | 38 | Did not advance | |
| Serghei Marghiev | Hammer throw | 74.97 | 6 q | 74.14 | 10 |

Women

| Athlete | Event | Qualification | | Final | |
| Athlete | Event | Distance | Position | Distance | Position |
|---|---|---|---|---|---|
| Zalina Marghieva | Hammer throw | 71.72 | 5 q | 73.50 | 5 |
| Marina Nichișenco | Hammer throw | 65.19 | 24 | Did not advance | |
| Natalia Stratulat | Discus throw | 53.27 | 30 | Did not advance | |
| Dimitriana Surdu | Shot put | 15.25 | 35 | Did not advance | |

== Canoeing ==
=== Sprint ===
Moldova has qualified a single boat in men's C-1 1000 m for the Games through the 2015 ICF Canoe Sprint World Championships. Meanwhile, the men's C-2 1000 m crew added their boat to the Moldovan team for the Games, as the International Canoe Federation had decided to revoke its license from Romania due to the canoeists' doping violations at the European Championships.

| Athlete | Event | Heats | | Semifinals | | Final | |
| Athlete | Event | Time | Rank | Time | Rank | Time | Rank |
|---|---|---|---|---|---|---|---|
| Oleg Tarnovschi | Men's C-1 200 m | 40.852 | 2 Q | 40.715 | 3 FB | 40.280 | 12 |
| Serghei Tarnovschi | Men's C-1 1000 m | 4:05.193 | 1 FA | Bye | | 4:00.852 | DSQ |

Qualification Legend: FA = Qualify to final (medal); FB = Qualify to final B (non-medal)

== Judo ==
Moldova has qualified one judoka for the men's half-middleweight category (81 kg) at the Games. Valeriu Duminică earned a continental quota spot from the European region, as Moldova's top-ranked judoka outside of direct qualifying position in the IJF World Ranking List of 30 May 2016.

| Athlete | Event | Round of 64 | Round of 32 | Round of 16 | Quarterfinals | Semifinals | Repechage | Final / BM | |
| Athlete | Event | Opposition Result | Opposition Result | Opposition Result | Opposition Result | Opposition Result | Opposition Result | Opposition Result | Rank |
|---|---|---|---|---|---|---|---|---|---|
| Valeriu Duminică | Men's −81 kg | Bye | Mrvaljević (MNE); W 002–000 | Marconcini (ITA); L 010–110 | Did not advance | | | | |

== Swimming ==
Moldova has received a Universality invitation from FINA to send two swimmers (one male and one female) to the Olympics.

| Athlete | Event | Heat | | Semifinal | | Final | |
| Athlete | Event | Time | Rank | Time | Rank | Time | Rank |
|---|---|---|---|---|---|---|---|
| Alexei Sancov | Men's 200 m freestyle | 1:48.85 | 34 | Did not advance | | | |
| Tatiana Chișca | Women's 100 m breaststroke | 1:11.37 | 36 | Did not advance | | | |

== Taekwondo ==
Moldova entered one athlete into the taekwondo competition for the first time at the Olympics. Aaron Cook, who previously competed for Team GB at the 2008 Beijing Olympics, qualified automatically for the men's welterweight category (80 kg) by finishing in the top 6 WTF Olympic rankings.

| Athlete | Event | Round of 16 | Quarterfinals | Semifinals | Repechage | Final / BM | |
| Athlete | Event | Opposition Result | Opposition Result | Opposition Result | Opposition Result | Opposition Result | Rank |
|---|---|---|---|---|---|---|---|
| Aaron Cook | Men's −80 kg | Liu W-t (TPE); L 2–14 PTG | Did not advance | | | | |

== Tennis ==
Moldova has entered one tennis player for the first time into the Olympic tournament. Due to the withdrawal of several tennis players from the Games, Radu Albot (world no. 113) received a spare ITF Olympic place to compete in the men's singles as the next highest-ranked eligible player, not yet qualified, in the ATP World Rankings as of 6 June 2016.

| Athlete | Event | Round of 64 | Round of 32 | Round of 16 | Quarterfinals | Semifinals | Final / BM | |
| Athlete | Event | Opposition Score | Opposition Score | Opposition Score | Opposition Score | Opposition Score | Opposition Score | Rank |
|---|---|---|---|---|---|---|---|---|
| Radu Albot | Men's singles | Gabashvili (RUS); W 4–6, 6–4, 6–4 | Čilić (CRO); L 3–6, 4–6 | Did not advance | | | | |

== Weightlifting ==
Moldovan weightlifters have qualified four men's quota places for the Rio Olympics through the 2014 and 2015 IWF World Championships. The team must allocate these places to individual athletes by 20 June 2016.

On 22 June 2016, the International Weightlifting Federation had decided to strip of two Olympic men's entry places from Moldova because of "multiple positive cases" of doping throughout the qualifying period.

Meanwhile, an unused women's Olympic spot was awarded to the Moldovan team by IWF, as a result of Russia's complete ban from the Games due to the "multiple positive cases" of doping.

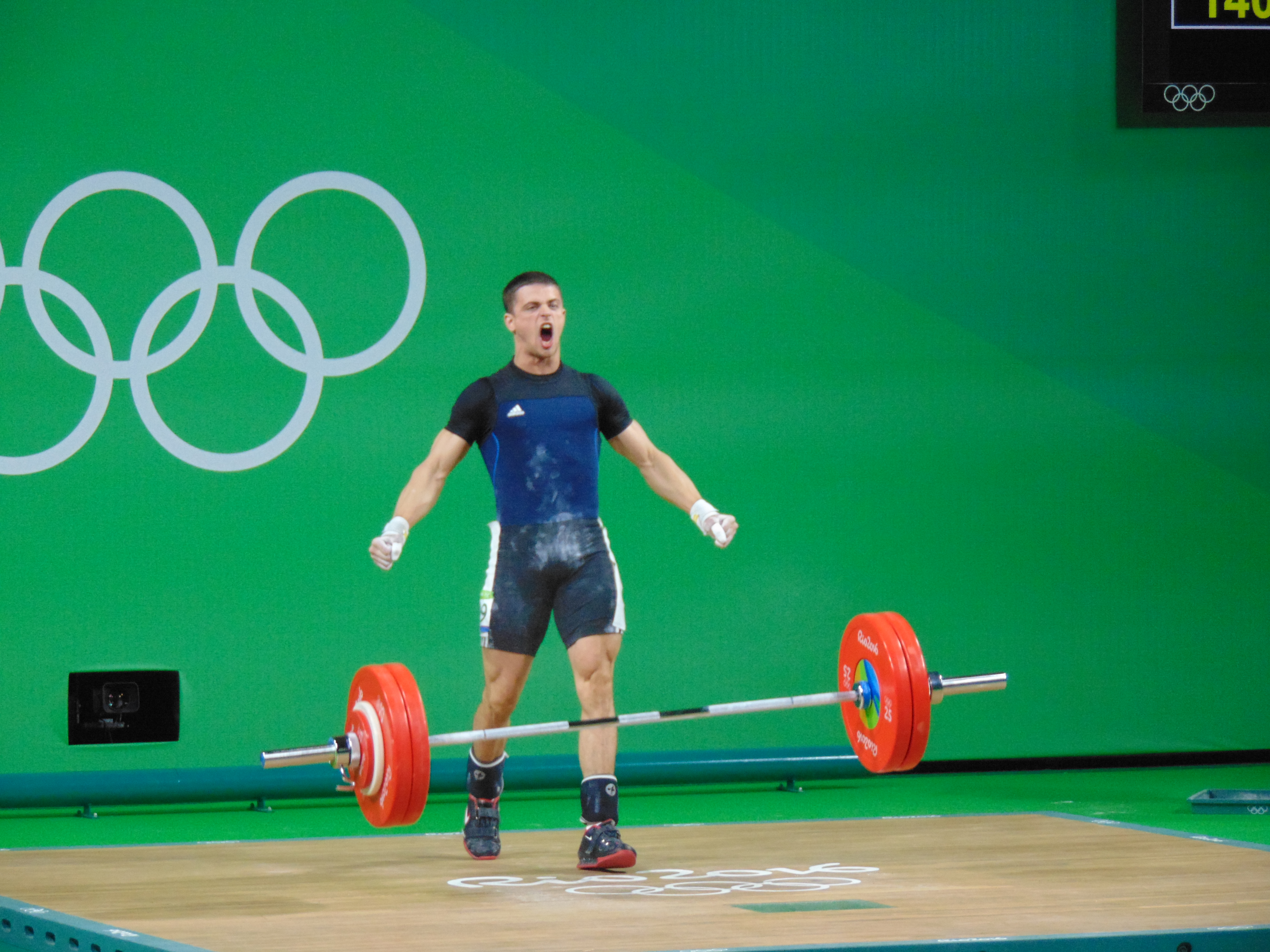
Serghei Cechir at the 2016 Olympics

| Athlete | Event | Snatch | | Clean & Jerk | | Total | Rank |
| Athlete | Event | Result | Rank | Result | Rank | Total | Rank |
|---|---|---|---|---|---|---|---|
| Serghei Cechir | Men's −69 kg | 144 | 8 | 178 | 8 | 322 | 6 |
| Alexandru Șpac | Men's −77 kg | 155 | 7 | 192 | 4 | 347 | 5 |
| Natalia Prișcepa | Women's −75 kg | 97 | 12 | 116 | 12 | 213 | 12 |

== Wrestling ==
Moldova has qualified two wrestlers for each of the following weight classes into the Olympic competition, as a result of their wrestle-off triumphs at the initial meet of the World Qualification Tournament in Ulaanbaatar.

On 11 May 2016, United World Wrestling awarded an additional Olympic license to Moldova in women's freestyle 58 kg, as a response to the doping violations on the Ukrainian wrestler at the European Qualification Tournament.

Key:

- VT – Victory by Fall.
- PP – Decision by Points – the loser with technical points.
- PO – Decision by Points – the loser without technical points.
- ST – Technical superiority – the loser without technical points and a margin of victory of at least 8 (Greco-Roman) or 10 (freestyle) points.
- SP – Technical superiority – the loser with technical points and a margin of victory of at least 8 (Greco-Roman) or 10 (freestyle) points.

Men's freestyle

| Athlete | Event | Qualification | Round of 16 | Quarterfinal | Semifinal | Repechage 1 | Repechage 2 | Final / BM | |
| Athlete | Event | Opposition Result | Opposition Result | Opposition Result | Opposition Result | Opposition Result | Opposition Result | Opposition Result | Rank |
|---|---|---|---|---|---|---|---|---|---|
| Evgheni Nedealco | −74 kg | Usserbayev (KAZ); L 1–4 ^{SP} | Did not advance | | | | | | 16 |
| Nicolae Ceban | −97 kg | Bye | Saritov (ROU); L 1–3 ^{PP} | Did not advance | | | | | 12 |

Women's freestyle

| Athlete | Event | Qualification | Round of 16 | Quarterfinal | Semifinal | Repechage 1 | Repechage 2 | Final / BM | |
| Athlete | Event | Opposition Result | Opposition Result | Opposition Result | Opposition Result | Opposition Result | Opposition Result | Opposition Result | Rank |
|---|---|---|---|---|---|---|---|---|---|
| Mariana Cherdivara | −58 kg | Antes (ECU); W 3–0 ^{PO} | Malik (IND); L 1–3 ^{PP} | Did not advance | | | | | 11 |
