= Haley Augello =

American freestyle wrestler (born 1994)

Personal information
- Born: October 17, 1994 (age 31) Lockport, Illinois, U.S.

Sport
- Country: United States
- Sport: Freestyle wrestling

Haley Augello (born October 17, 1994) is an American freestyle wrestler who competed at the 2016 Summer Olympics.

She is a 2013 graduate of Lockport Township High School in Lockport, Illinois. She won two college national championships for King University in Bristol, Tennessee.

In 2016, Augello won the American Olympic trials at the 48 kg category.

At the 2016 World Wrestling Olympic Qualification Tournament 1 she finished in 2nd to qualify for the Olympics.

At the 2016 Olympic Games in Rio she finished 7th overall in women's 48 kilogram freestyle wrestling.
