= Georgi Ivanov (wrestler, born 1989) =

Bulgarian freestyle wrestler

Georgi Ivanov (Bulgarian: Георги Иванов) (born November 11, 1989) is a Bulgarian freestyle wrestler. He competed in the men's freestyle 74 kg event at the 2016 Summer Olympics, in which he was eliminated in the round of 16 by Jakob Makarashvili; he retired from competitive wrestling after this event. In April 2023, he opened the Iowa West Field House in Council Bluffs, Iowa as a wrestling training space.
