= Denys Solonenko =

Ukrainian boxer

Denys Solonenko (Ukrainian: Денис Солоненко, born 25 October 1992) is a Ukrainian boxer. He competed at the 2016 Summer Olympics in the men's light heavyweight event, in which he was eliminated in the round of 32 by Teymur Mammadov.
