= Volodymyr Matviichuk =

Ukrainian boxer (born 1982)

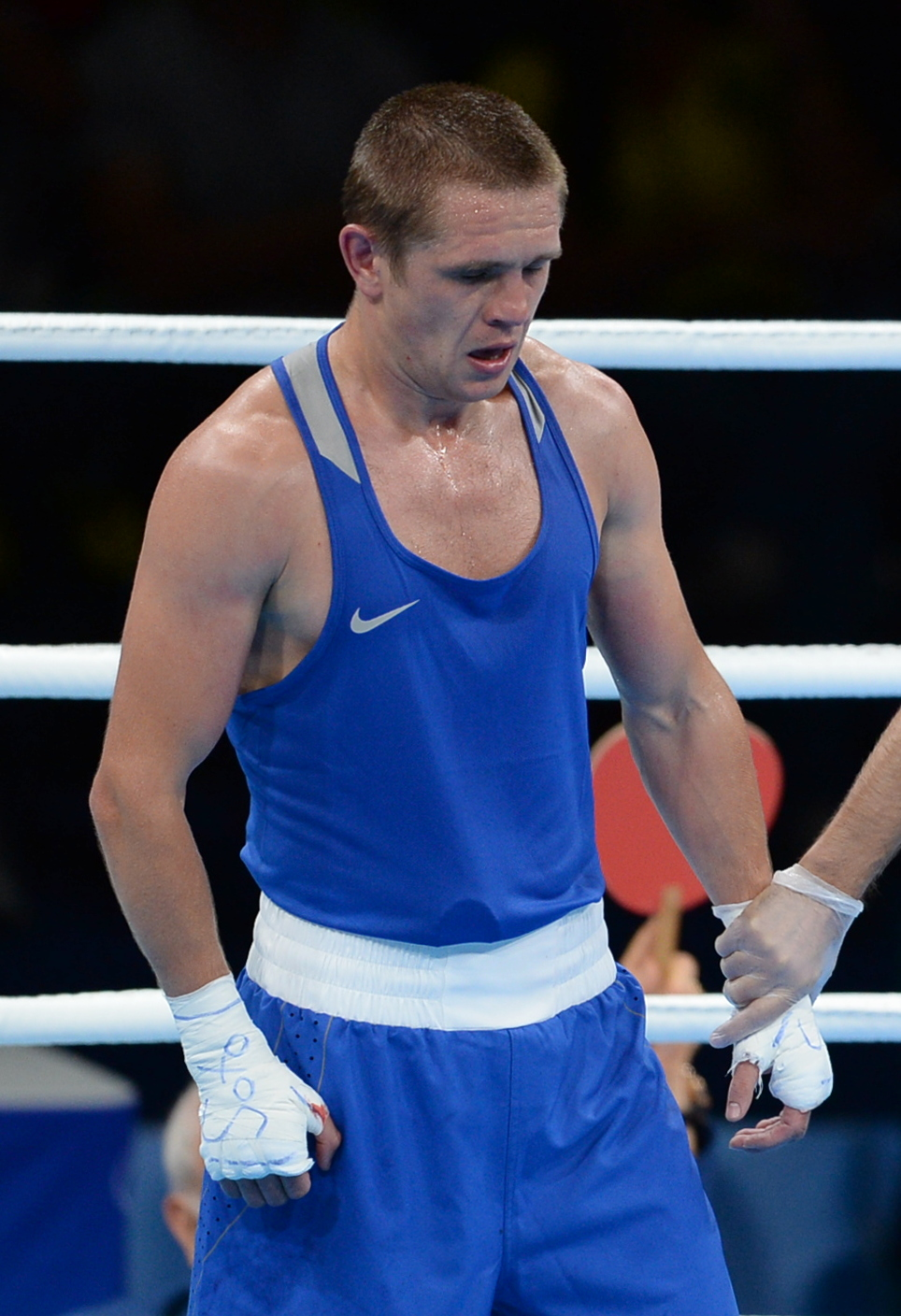
- Matviichuk at the 2016 Olympics

Personal information
- Born: 29 December 1982 (age 43)
- Height: 171 cm (5 ft 7 in)

Sport
- Sport: Boxing
- Weight class: lightweight
- Club: Kozak Boxing Club
- Coached by: Igor Matviychuk; Sergiy Stashchenko
Medal record
Men's amateur boxing
Representing Ukraine
European Amateur Championships
Bronze medal – third place	2011 Ankara	-60 kg

Volodymyr Matviichuk (Ukrainian: Володимир Матвійчук, also transliterated Matviychuk, born 29 December 1982) is a Ukrainian amateur lightweight boxer. He won a bronze medal at the 2011 European Championships and competed at the 2016 Olympics, where he was eliminated in the first bout. Matviichuk has degrees in economics and coaching from Zhytomyr State Technological University.
