= 2016 Asia & Oceania Boxing Olympic Qualification Tournament =

Boxing competitions

- Venue: Tangshan Jiujiang Sport Center
- Location: Qian'an, China
- Start date: March 25, 2016
- End date: April 2, 2016

The 2016 Asia & Oceania Boxing Olympic Qualification Tournament for boxing at the 2016 Summer Olympics in Rio de Janeiro, Brazil, were held from March 25 to April 2, 2016 at the Tangshan Jiujiang Sport Center in Qian'an, China. 279 boxers entered the qualification tournament.

== Medalists ==
=== Medal table ===
Rank	Nation	Gold	Silver	Bronze	Total
1	Uzbekistan	5	2	0	7
2	China	3	3	2	8
3	Kazakhstan	3	2	2	7
4	Mongolia	1	1	3	5
5	Thailand	1	1	1	3
6	Philippines	0	2	2	4
7	Australia	0	1	2	3
7	India	0	1	2	3
9	Kyrgyzstan	0	0	3	3
10	Chinese Taipei	0	0	2	2
11	Iran	0	0	1	1
11	Japan	0	0	1	1
11	Jordan	0	0	1	1
11	North Korea	0	0	1	1
11	Tajikistan	0	0	1	1
11	Turkmenistan	0	0	1	1
11	Vietnam	0	0	1	1
Totals (17 entries)		13	13	26	52

=== Men ===
Event	Gold	Silver	Bronze
−49 kg	Hasanboy Dusmatov; Uzbekistan	Rogen Ladon; Philippines	Gankhuyagiin Gan-Erdene; Mongolia
−49 kg	Hasanboy Dusmatov; Uzbekistan	Rogen Ladon; Philippines	Devendro Singh; India
−52 kg	Shakhobidin Zoirov; Uzbekistan	Hu Jianguan; China	Olzhas Sattibayev; Kazakhstan
−52 kg	Shakhobidin Zoirov; Uzbekistan	Hu Jianguan; China	Azat Usenaliev; Kyrgyzstan
−56 kg	Chatchai Butdee; Thailand	Shiva Thapa; India	Kairat Yeraliyev; Kazakhstan
−56 kg	Chatchai Butdee; Thailand	Shiva Thapa; India	Mario Fernandez; Philippines
−60 kg	Dorjnyambuugiin Otgondalai; Mongolia	Charly Suarez; Philippines	Daisuke Narimatsu; Japan
−60 kg	Dorjnyambuugiin Otgondalai; Mongolia	Charly Suarez; Philippines	Shan Jun; China
−64 kg	Ablaikhan Zhussupov; Kazakhstan	Baatarsükhiin Chinzorig; Mongolia	Hu Qianxun; China
−64 kg	Ablaikhan Zhussupov; Kazakhstan	Baatarsükhiin Chinzorig; Mongolia	Ermek Sakenov; Kyrgyzstan
−69 kg	Shakhram Giyasov; Uzbekistan	Sailom Adi; Thailand	Byambyn Tüvshinbat; Mongolia
−69 kg	Shakhram Giyasov; Uzbekistan	Sailom Adi; Thailand	Eumir Marcial; Philippines
−75 kg	Zhanibek Alimkhanuly; Kazakhstan	Zhao Minggang; China	Daniel Lewis; Australia
−75 kg	Zhanibek Alimkhanuly; Kazakhstan	Zhao Minggang; China	Narmandakhyn Shinebayar; Mongolia
−81 kg	Elshod Rasulov; Uzbekistan	Adilbek Niyazymbetov; Kazakhstan	Erkin Adylbek Uulu; Kyrgyzstan
−81 kg	Elshod Rasulov; Uzbekistan	Adilbek Niyazymbetov; Kazakhstan	Aziz Achilov; Turkmenistan
−91 kg	Rustam Tulaganov; Uzbekistan	Yu Fengkai; China	Jason Whateley; Australia
−91 kg	Rustam Tulaganov; Uzbekistan	Yu Fengkai; China	Jahon Qurbonov; Tajikistan
+91 kg	Ivan Dychko; Kazakhstan	Bakhodir Jalolov; Uzbekistan	Hussein Ishaish; Jordan
+91 kg	Ivan Dychko; Kazakhstan	Bakhodir Jalolov; Uzbekistan	Abdolmajid Sepahvandi; Iran

=== Women ===
Event	Gold	Silver	Bronze
−51 kg	Ren Cancan; China	Yodgoroy Mirzaeva; Uzbekistan	Lin Yu-ting; Chinese Taipei
−51 kg	Ren Cancan; China	Yodgoroy Mirzaeva; Uzbekistan	Mary Kom; India
−60 kg	Yin Junhua; China	Shelley Watts; Australia	Lừu Thị Duyên; Vietnam
−60 kg	Yin Junhua; China	Shelley Watts; Australia	Tassamalee Thongjan; Thailand
−75 kg	Li Qian; China	Dariga Shakimova; Kazakhstan	Chen Nien-chin; Chinese Taipei
−75 kg	Li Qian; China	Dariga Shakimova; Kazakhstan	Jang Un-hui; North Korea

== Qualification summary ==
NOC	Men										Women			Total
NOC	49	52	56	60	64	69	75	81	91	+91	51	60	75	Total
Australia							X		X			X		3
China		X			X		X		X		X	X	X	7
India			X											1
Japan				X										1
Jordan										X				1
Kazakhstan		X	X		X		X	X		X			X	7
Kyrgyzstan								X						1
Mongolia	X			X	X	X								4
Philippines	X			X										2
Thailand			X			X								2
Uzbekistan	X	X				X		X	X	X	X			7
Total: 11 NOCs	3	3	3	3	3	3	3	3	3	3	2	2	2	36

== Results ==
=== Men ===
==== Light flyweight (49 kg) ====
The top three boxers qualified to the 2016 Summer Olympics.

Round of 32
	Score	
Kim Un-song (PRK)	0–3	Tosho Kashiwasaki (JPN)
Josh English (AUS)	0–3	Turat Osmonov (KGZ)

Round of 16
Rogen Ladon (PHI)	3
Tosho Kashiwasaki (JPN)	0
Hasan Ali (IRQ)	TKO
Abdulla Al-Mulla (UAE)
Tu Po-wei (TPE)	3
Lee Ye-chan (KOR)	0
Mohd Fuad Redzuan (MAS)	0
Devendro Singh (IND)	3
Gankhuyagiin Gan-Erdene (MGL)	3
Shuhrat Sabzaliev (TJK)	0
Huỳnh Ngọc Tân (VIE)	3
Dayanch Annaseidov (TKM)	0
Cornelis Kwangu Langu (INA)	TKO
Abdullah Daraghmeh (JOR)
Turat Osmonov (KGZ)	0
Hasanboy Dusmatov (UZB)	3

Quarterfinals
Rogen Ladon (PHI)	3
Hasan Ali (IRQ)	0
Tu Po-wei (TPE)	0
Devendro Singh (IND)	3
Gankhuyagiin Gan-Erdene (MGL)	3
Huỳnh Ngọc Tân (VIE)	0
Cornelis Kwangu Langu (INA)	0
Hasanboy Dusmatov (UZB)	3

Semifinals
Rogen Ladon (PHI)	3
Devendro Singh (IND)	0
Gankhuyagiin Gan-Erdene (MGL)	0
Hasanboy Dusmatov (UZB)	3

Final
Rogen Ladon (PHI)	1
Hasanboy Dusmatov (UZB)	2
Olympic box-off
Devendro Singh (IND)	0
Gankhuyagiin Gan-Erdene (MGL)	3

==== Flyweight (52 kg) ====
The top three boxers qualified to the 2016 Summer Olympics.

Round of 32
	Score	
Pouya Navi (IRI)	2–1	Charles Keama (PNG)
Kim In-kyu (KOR)	3–0	Fayzmamad Malakhbekov (TJK)
Roldan Boncales (PHI)	3–0	Trần Văn Thảo (VIE)
Alex Winwood (AUS)	3–0	Ivan Pavich (NZL)
Kharkhüügiin Enkh-Amar (MGL)	3–0	Jan Chun-hsien (TPE)
Azuwan Mohd Nor (MAS)	0–3	Ryomei Tanaka (JPN)
Hanurdeen Hamid (SIN)	3–0	Mario Blasius Kali (INA)

Round of 16
Hu Jianguan (CHN)	3
Pouya Navi (IRI)	0
Tanes Ongjunta (THA)	1
Zarip Jumayev (TKM)	2
Ri Chung-il (PRK)	1
Kim In-kyu (KOR)	2
Roldan Boncales (PHI)	0
Olzhas Sattibayev (KAZ)	3
Azat Usenaliev (KGZ)	3
Alex Winwood (AUS)	0
Kharkhüügiin Enkh-Amar (MGL)	TKO
Mohammad Abu-Jajeh (JOR)
Gaurav Bidhuri (IND)	0
Ryomei Tanaka (JPN)	3
Hanurdeen Hamid (SIN)	0
Shakhobidin Zoirov (UZB)	3

Quarterfinals
Hu Jianguan (CHN)	3
Zarip Jumayev (TKM)	0
Kim In-kyu (KOR)	0
Olzhas Sattibayev (KAZ)	3
Azat Usenaliev (KGZ)	2
Kharkhüügiin Enkh-Amar (MGL)	1
Ryomei Tanaka (JPN)	0
Shakhobidin Zoirov (UZB)	3

Semifinals
Hu Jianguan (CHN)	3
Olzhas Sattibayev (KAZ)	0
Azat Usenaliev (KGZ)	0
Shakhobidin Zoirov (UZB)	3

Final
Hu Jianguan (CHN)	1
Shakhobidin Zoirov (UZB)	2
Olympic box-off
Olzhas Sattibayev (KAZ)	3
Azat Usenaliev (KGZ)	0

==== Bantamweight (56 kg) ====
The top three boxers qualified to the 2016 Summer Olympics.

Round of 32
	Score	
Lee Myeong-kwan (KOR)	3–0	Oraz Avzalshoev (TJK)
Erdenebatyn Tsendbaatar (MGL)	3–0	Adrienne Francisco (GUM)
Yakub Meredov (TKM)	3–0	Abdullateef Sadiq (QAT)
Keegan O'Kane-Jones (NZL)	3–0	Pauliasi Ratu (FIJ)

Round of 16
Shiva Thapa (IND)	3
Lee Myeong-kwan (KOR)	0
Arashi Morisaka (JPN)	TKO
Saab Al-Sadid (UAE)
Lin Sheng-ling (TPE)	0
Kairat Yeraliyev (KAZ)	3
Erdenebatyn Tsendbaatar (MGL)	3
Jaafar Abdul-Ridha (IRQ)	0
Mario Fernandez (PHI)	3
Yakub Meredov (TKM)	0
Mohammad Al-Wadi (JOR)	3
Jayden Hansen (AUS)	0
Omurbek Malabekov (KGZ)	3
Armin Amjadian (IRI)	0
Keegan O'Kane-Jones (NZL)	0
Chatchai Butdee (THA)	3

Quarterfinals
Shiva Thapa (IND)	2
Arashi Morisaka (JPN)	1
Kairat Yeraliyev (KAZ)	3
Erdenebatyn Tsendbaatar (MGL)	0
Mario Fernandez (PHI)	3
Mohammad Al-Wadi (JOR)	0
Omurbek Malabekov (KGZ)	0
Chatchai Butdee (THA)	3

Semifinals
Shiva Thapa (IND)	3
Kairat Yeraliyev (KAZ)	0
Mario Fernandez (PHI)	0
Chatchai Butdee (THA)	3

Final
Shiva Thapa (IND)	0
Chatchai Butdee (THA)	3
Olympic box-off
Kairat Yeraliyev (KAZ)	3
Mario Fernandez (PHI)	0

==== Lightweight (60 kg) ====
The top three boxer qualified to the 2016 Summer Olympics.

Round of 32
	Score	
Ammar Jabbar (IRQ)	3–0	Thadius Katua (PNG)
Dana Esmaeilzadeh (IRI)	DSQ	Choi Hae-ju (KOR)
Farrand Papendang (INA)	0–3	Anvar Yunusov (TJK)
Hursand Imankuliýew (TKM)	1–2	Lai Chu-en (TPE)

Round of 16
Dorjnyambuugiin Otgondalai (MGL)	3
Ammar Jabbar (IRQ)	0
Hakan Erşeker (QAT)	3
Ahmed Obaid (UAE)	0
Daisuke Narimatsu (JPN)	3
Bek Kamchybekov (KGZ)	0
Choi Hae-ju (KOR)
Obada Al-Kasbeh (JOR)	WO
Shan Jun (CHN)	3
Anvar Yunusov (TJK)	0
Chad Milnes (NZL)	1
Harry Garside (AUS)	2
Dheeraj Rangi (IND)	3
Pachanya Longchin (THA)	0
Lai Chu-en (TPE)	0
Charly Suarez (PHI)	3

Quarterfinals
Dorjnyambuugiin Otgondalai (MGL)
Hakan Erşeker (QAT)	0
Daisuke Narimatsu (JPN)	3
Obada Al-Kasbeh (JOR)	0
Shan Jun (CHN)	2
Harry Garside (AUS)	1
Dheeraj Rangi (IND)	0
Charly Suarez (PHI)	3

Semifinals
Dorjnyambuugiin Otgondalai (MGL)	3
Daisuke Narimatsu (JPN)	0
Shan Jun (CHN)
Charly Suarez (PHI)	TKO

Final
Dorjnyambuugiin Otgondalai (MGL)	2
Charly Suarez (PHI)	1
Olympic box-off
Daisuke Narimatsu (JPN)	3
Shan Jun (CHN)	0

==== Light welterweight (64 kg) ====
The top three boxers qualified to the 2016 Summer Olympics.

Round of 32
	Score	
Ablaikhan Zhussupov (KAZ)	3–0	Manoj Kumar (IND)
Colan Caleb (NRU)	0–3	Pan Hung-ming (TPE)
Qasim Kareem (IRQ)	0–3	Hu Qianxun (CHN)
Baatarsükhiin Chinzorig (MGL)	3–0	Fineasi Tuipulotu (TGA)
Ahmad Al-Matbouli (JOR)	3–0	Vinky Montolalu (INA)

Round of 16
Lim Hyun-chul (KOR)	0
Ablaikhan Zhussupov (KAZ)	3
David Biddle (AUS)	3
Richie Hadlow (NZL)	0
Leong Jun Hao (SIN)	0
Pan Hung-ming (TPE)	3
Hu Qianxun (CHN)	3
Khir Akyazlan Azmi (MAS)	0
Hikaru Okishima (JPN)	0
Baatarsükhiin Chinzorig (MGL)	3
Thulasi Tharumalingam (QAT)	1
Ri Kon-thae (PRK)	2
Ermek Sakenov (KGZ)	3
Esmaeil Armashi (IRI)	0
Ahmad Al-Matbouli (JOR)	0
Aziz Bebitov (TKM)	3

Quarterfinals
Ablaikhan Zhussupov (KAZ)	3
David Biddle (AUS)	0
Pan Hung-ming (TPE)	0
Hu Qianxun (CHN)	3
Baatarsükhiin Chinzorig (MGL)	3
Ri Kon-thae (PRK)	0
Ermek Sakenov (KGZ)	2
Aziz Bebitov (TKM)	1

Semifinals
Ablaikhan Zhussupov (KAZ)	3
Hu Qianxun (CHN)	0
Baatarsükhiin Chinzorig (MGL)	3
Ermek Sakenov (KGZ)	0

Final
Ablaikhan Zhussupov (KAZ)	2
Baatarsükhiin Chinzorig (MGL)	1
Olympic box-off
Hu Qianxun (CHN)	2
Ermek Sakenov (KGZ)	1

==== Welterweight (69 kg) ====
The top three boxers qualified to the 2016 Summer Olympics.

Round of 32
	Score	
Huang Chi-wen (TPE)	0–3	Fano Kori (AUS)
Ryuji Sato (JPN)	DSQ	Huzam Nabaah (QAT)
Josh Nyika (NZL)	2–1	Erkinbek Bolotbek Uulu (KGZ)
Winston Hill (FIJ)	0–3	Sharaf Davlatov (TJK)

Round of 16
Eumir Marcial (PHI)	TKO
Fano Kori (AUS)
Andrew Aisaga (PNG)	0
Sajjad Kazemzadeh (IRI)	3
Seif Qraish (JOR)	0
Lee Dong-jin (KOR)	3
Ryuji Sato (JPN)	0
Shakhram Giyasov (UZB)	3
Ahmad Ghossoun (SYR)	3
Josh Nyika (NZL)	0
Mandeep Jangra (IND)	0
Sailom Adi (THA)	3
Ahmed Harara (PLE)	0
Bahtiyar Masharipov (TKM)	3
Sharaf Davlatov (TJK)
Byambyn Tüvshinbat (MGL)	TKO

Quarterfinals
Eumir Marcial (PHI)	3
Sajjad Kazemzadeh (IRI)	0
Lee Dong-jin (KOR)	0
Shakhram Giyasov (UZB)	3
Ahmad Ghossoun (SYR)	1
Sailom Adi (THA)	2
Bahtiyar Masharipov (TKM)	0
Byambyn Tüvshinbat (MGL)	3

Semifinals
Eumir Marcial (PHI)	0
Shakhram Giyasov (UZB)	3
Sailom Adi (THA)	2
Byambyn Tüvshinbat (MGL)	1

Final
Shakhram Giyasov (UZB)	3
Sailom Adi (THA)	0
Olympic box-off
Eumir Marcial (PHI)	0
Byambyn Tüvshinbat (MGL)	3

==== Middleweight (75 kg) ====
The top three boxers qualified to the 2016 Summer Olympics.

Round of 32
	Score	
Makoto Takahashi (JPN)	2–1	Kan Chia-wei (TPE)

Round of 16
Zhanibek Alimkhanuly (KAZ)	3
Makoto Takahashi (JPN)	0
Ryan Scaife (NZL)	0
Iliar Akhmetov (KGZ)	3
Aphisit Kanankhokkhruea (THA)	0
Narmandakhyn Shinebayar (MGL)	3
Shabbos Negmatulloev (TJK)	1
Sajjad Mehrabi (IRI)	2
Jonathan Keama (PNG)	0
Daniel Lewis (AUS)	3
Arslanbek Achilov (TKM)	3
Trương Đình Hoàng (VIE)	0
Lee Dong-yun (KOR)	3
Zeyad Ishaish (JOR)	0
Zhao Minggang (CHN)	3
Vikas Krishan Yadav (IND)	0

Quarterfinals
Zhanibek Alimkhanuly (KAZ)	3
Iliar Akhmetov (KGZ)	0
Narmandakhyn Shinebayar (MGL)	2
Sajjad Mehrabi (IRI)	1
Daniel Lewis (AUS)	2
Arslanbek Achilov (TKM)	1
Lee Dong-yun (KOR)	0
Zhao Minggang (CHN)	3

Semifinals
Zhanibek Alimkhanuly (KAZ)	TKO
Narmandakhyn Shinebayar (MGL)
Daniel Lewis (AUS)	0
Zhao Minggang (CHN)	3

Final
Zhanibek Alimkhanuly (KAZ)	TKO
Zhao Minggang (CHN)
Olympic box-off
Narmandakhyn Shinebayar (MGL)	0
Daniel Lewis (AUS)	3

==== Light heavyweight (81 kg) ====
The top three boxers qualified to the 2016 Summer Olympics.

Round of 32
	Score	
Yang Hee-geun (KOR)	3–0	Sumit Sangwan (IND)
Odai Al-Hindawi (JOR)	1–2	Shi Guojun (CHN)

Round of 16
Adilbek Niyazymbetov (KAZ)	3
Yang Hee-geun (KOR)	0
Hakan Nuraydin (QAT)	0
Alaaeddin Ghossoun (SYR)	3
Pouono Lopeti (TGA)
Aziz Achilov (TKM)	TKO
Tyson Sykes (NZL)	TKO
Zakaria Ismail (SIN)
Anavat Thongkrathok (THA)	0
Erkin Adylbek Uulu (KGZ)	3
Tina Ruata (FIJ)
Sandagsürengiin Erdenebayar (MGL)	TKO
Navruz Jafoev (TJK)	3
Mathew Sheehan (AUS)	0
Shi Guojun (CHN)	0
Elshod Rasulov (UZB)	3

Quarterfinals
Adilbek Niyazymbetov (KAZ)	3
Alaaeddin Ghossoun (SYR)	0
Aziz Achilov (TKM)	3
Tyson Sykes (NZL)	0
Erkin Adylbek Uulu (KGZ)	3
Sandagsürengiin Erdenebayar (MGL)	0
Navruz Jafoev (TJK)	0
Elshod Rasulov (UZB)	3

Semifinals
Adilbek Niyazymbetov (KAZ)	3
Aziz Achilov (TKM)	0
Erkin Adylbek Uulu (KGZ)
Elshod Rasulov (UZB)	TKO

Final
Adilbek Niyazymbetov (KAZ)	0
Elshod Rasulov (UZB)	2
Olympic box-off
Aziz Achilov (TKM)	0
Erkin Adylbek Uulu (KGZ)	3

==== Heavyweight (91 kg) ====
The top three boxers qualified to the 2016 Summer Olympics.

Round of 16
Ihab Al-Matbouli (JOR)	0
David Nyika (NZL)	3
Yu Fengkai (CHN)	3
Kim Hyeong-kyu (KOR)	0
Sergei Parenko (KGZ)	2
Tolyekiin Yerbolat (MGL)	1

Quarterfinals
Rustam Tulaganov (UZB)	3
David Nyika (NZL)	0
Jason Whateley (AUS)	3
Parveen Kumar (IND)	0
Salar Gholami (IRI)	0
Yu Fengkai (CHN)	3
Sergei Parenko (KGZ)	0
Jahon Qurbonov (TJK)	3

Semifinals
Rustam Tulaganov (UZB)	3
Jason Whateley (AUS)	0
Yu Fengkai (CHN)	3
Jahon Qurbonov (TJK)	0

Final
Rustam Tulaganov (UZB)	WO
Yu Fengkai (CHN)
Olympic box-off
Jason Whateley (AUS)	2
Jahon Qurbonov (TJK)	1

==== Super heavyweight (+91 kg) ====
The top three boxers qualified to the 2016 Summer Olympics.

Round of 16
Joe Goodall (AUS)
Patrick Mailata (NZL)	TKO
Siyovush Zukhurov (TJK)	0
Hussein Ishaish (JOR)	3
Mohammad Mulayes (SYR)	TKO
Sepesitiano Hurrell (TGA)
Satish Kumar (IND)	0
Mu Haipeng (CHN)	3

Quarterfinals
Ivan Dychko (KAZ)	TKO
Patrick Mailata (NZL)
Hussein Ishaish (JOR)	3
Song Hwa-pyeong (KOR)	0
Abdolmajid Sepahvandi (IRI)	3
Mohammad Mulayes (SYR)	0
Mu Haipeng (CHN)	0
Bakhodir Jalolov (UZB)	3

Semifinals
Ivan Dychko (KAZ)	3
Hussein Ishaish (JOR)	0
Abdolmajid Sepahvandi (IRI)
Bakhodir Jalolov (UZB)	TKO

Final
Ivan Dychko (KAZ)	3
Bakhodir Jalolov (UZB)	0
Olympic box-off
Hussein Ishaish (JOR)	3
Abdolmajid Sepahvandi (IRI)	0

=== Women ===
==== Flyweight (51 kg) ====
The two finalists qualified to the 2016 Summer Olympics.

Round of 16
Mary Kom (IND)	2
Nazym Kyzaibay (KAZ)	1
Nesthy Petecio (PHI)	3
Jennifer Chieng (FSM)	0
Nam Eun-jin (KOR)	3
Reem Al-Mriheel (JOR)	0
Madoka Wada (JPN)	0
Ren Cancan (CHN)	3
Ri Hyang-mi (PRK)	2
Lê Thị Bằng (VIE)	0
Yodgoroy Mirzaeva (UZB)	2
Aldriani Beatrichx Sugoro (INA)	0
Kristy Harris (AUS)	0
Peamwilai Laopeam (THA)	3
Lin Yu-ting (TPE)	2
Myagmardulamyn Nandintsetseg (MGL)	1

Quarterfinals
Mary Kom (IND)	3
Nesthy Petecio (PHI)	0
Nam Eun-jin (KOR)	0
Ren Cancan (CHN)	3
Ri Hyang-mi (PRK)	0
Yodgoroy Mirzaeva (UZB)	3
Peamwilai Laopeam (THA)	1
Lin Yu-ting (TPE)	2

Semifinals
Mary Kom (IND)	0
Ren Cancan (CHN)	3
Yodgoroy Mirzaeva (UZB)	3
Lin Yu-ting (TPE)	0

Final
Ren Cancan (CHN)	3
Yodgoroy Mirzaeva (UZB)	0

Semifinals	Bronze medal
	Mary Kom (IND)	0
	Lin Yu-ting (TPE)	3

==== Lightweight (60 kg) ====
The two finalists qualified to the 2016 Summer Olympics.

Round of 32
	Score	
Ri Tong-sun (PRK)	3–0	Christina Marwan Jembay (INA)
Saraswati Rana Magar (NEP)	0–3	Oyuungereliin Suvd-Erdene (MGL)

Round of 16
Yin Junhua (CHN)	3
Ri Tong-sun (PRK)	0
Nazym Ichshanova (KAZ)	3
Pueki Fifita (TGA)	0
Tomoko Kugimiya (JPN)	0
Laishram Sarita Devi (IND)	2
Alexis Pritchard (NZL)	0
Lừu Thị Duyên (VIE)	3
Shelley Watts (AUS)	3
Huang Hsiao-wen (TPE)	0
Mavzuna Chorieva (TJK)	3
Diana Nadim (AFG)	0
Tassamalee Thongjan (THA)	3
Maftunakhon Melieva (UZB)	0
Oyuungereliin Suvd-Erdene (MGL)	0
Oh Yeon-ji (KOR)	3

Quarterfinals
Yin Junhua (CHN)	3
Nazym Ichshanova (KAZ)	0
Laishram Sarita Devi (IND)	1
Lừu Thị Duyên (VIE)	2
Shelley Watts (AUS)	3
Mavzuna Chorieva (TJK)	0
Tassamalee Thongjan (THA)	2
Oh Yeon-ji (KOR)	1

Semifinals
Yin Junhua (CHN)	3
Lừu Thị Duyên (VIE)	0
Shelley Watts (AUS)	2
Tassamalee Thongjan (THA)	1

Final
Yin Junhua (CHN)	WO
Shelley Watts (AUS)

Semifinals	Bronze medal
	Lừu Thị Duyên (VIE)	3
	Tassamalee Thongjan (THA)	0

==== Middleweight (75 kg) ====
The two finalists qualified to the 2016 Summer Olympics.

Round of 16
Pooja Rani (IND)	1
Shoira Zulkaynarova (TJK)	2
Deanna Carpenter (NZL)	0
Chen Nien-chin (TPE)	3
Kim Shin-hyeong (KOR)	0
Dariga Shakimova (KAZ)	3
Nafisakhon Askarova (UZB)	0
Ngô Thị Chung (VIE)	2

Quarterfinals
Li Qian (CHN)	TKO
Shoira Zulkaynarova (TJK)
Chen Nien-chin (TPE)	3
Caitlin Parker (AUS)	0
Enkhbaataryn Erdenetuyaa (MGL)	0
Dariga Shakimova (KAZ)	3
Ngô Thị Chung (VIE)	0
Jang Un-hui (PRK)	3

Semifinals
Li Qian (CHN)	3
Chen Nien-chin (TPE)	0
Dariga Shakimova (KAZ)	3
Jang Un-hui (PRK)	0

Final
Li Qian (CHN)	3
Dariga Shakimova (KAZ)	0

Semifinals	Bronze medal
	Chen Nien-chin (TPE)	2
	Jang Un-hui (PRK)	0
