= Weightlifting at the 2016 Summer Olympics – Qualification =

This article details the qualifying phase for weightlifting at the 2016 Summer Olympics. The competition at these Games includes 260 athletes. Each competing nation is allowed to enter a maximum of 10 competitors, 6 men and 4 women. 2014 and 2015 World Weightlifting Championships are the main qualifying events for the 2016 Olympic games. NOCs achieve qualification places according to their position in the joint team classification by points adding those scored in the 2014 and 2015 World Championships. One continental qualification event is held for each continent in 2016. Only NOCs which have not gained quota places in the Main Qualification Events may obtain quota places.

On November 19, 2015, the International Weightlifting Federation banned Bulgaria from competing at the Rio Olympics due to doping, and took one Olympic entry place from Romania and Uzbekistan because of "multiple positive cases" of doping.

On 22 June 2016, the International Weightlifting Federation announced that a number of countries would lose quota places in weightlifting at the Games because of doping violations. IWF then went on to state that if the testing of 'B' samples confirmed any country had three or more violations in the 2008 and 2012 Olympic retesting programme, that country would be suspended from international weightlifting for one year, and would thereby be excluded from the Games in Rio, alongside the already suspended Bulgaria.

IWF clarified that after retesting of 'A' samples from 2008 and 2012 that the three countries therefore scheduled for suspension were Kazakhstan, Russia and Belarus. Russia is appealing this decision also to the Court of Arbitration for Sport on 6 July 2016. In addition, quota places have been removed from Azerbaijan (2), Belarus (1), Kazakhstan (1), Moldova (2), North Korea (2), Russia (2), Romania (1) and Uzbekistan (1).

== Summary ==
NOC	Men	Women	Total
Albania	1	1***	2
Algeria	1	1	2
American Samoa	1		1
Argentina		1	1
Armenia	5	2	7
Australia	1	1	2
Austria	1		1
Belarus	5**	3	8
Belgium	1***		1
Brazil	3	2	5
Cameroon	1	1	2
Canada	1	1	2
Chile	1	1	2
China	6	4	10
Colombia	5	4	9
Cook Islands		1	1
Croatia	1***		1
Cuba	1	1	2
Cyprus	1		1
Czech Republic	1		1
Dominican Republic	1	2	3
Ecuador	1	2	3
El Salvador	1		1
Estonia	1		1
Egypt	6	3	9
Fiji	1	1	2
Finland	1	1	2
France	4	1	5
Georgia	3	1***	4
Germany	4	1	5
Ghana	1		1
Great Britain	1	1	2
Greece	1		1
Guatemala	1		1
Haiti	1		1
Honduras	1		1
Hungary	1		1
India	1	1	2
Indonesia	5	2	7
Iran	5		5
Iraq	1		1
Israel	1		1
Italy	1	1	2
Japan	3	4	7
Kazakhstan	5**	3**	8
Kenya	1		1
Kiribati	1		1
Kyrgyzstan	1	1	2
Latvia	1	1	2
Lithuania	1		1
Madagascar		1	1
Malaysia	1		1
Malta	1		1
Marshall Islands		1	1
Mauritius		1	1
Mexico	1	3	4
Moldova	2**	1***	3
Mongolia	1***	1	2
Morocco	1	1	2
Nauru	1		1
New Zealand	1	1	2
Nicaragua		1	1
Nigeria		1	1
North Korea	5**	3**	8
Papua New Guinea	1		1
Peru	1	1	2
Philippines	1	1	2
Poland	4	1	5
Puerto Rico		1	1
Qatar	1		1
Romania	2*	2	4
Samoa	1	1	2
Saudi Arabia	1		1
Serbia	1***		1
Seychelles	1		1
Slovakia	1		1
Solomon Islands		1	1
South Korea	4	3	7
Spain	3	1	4
Sri Lanka	1		1
Sweden		1	1
Syria	1		1
Chinese Taipei	3	4	7
Thailand	5	4	9
Tunisia	1	1	2
Turkey	1	3	4
Turkmenistan	1	1	2
Ukraine	4	4	8
United Arab Emirates		1	1
United States	1	3	4
Uruguay		1	1
Uzbekistan	5	0*	5
Venezuela	1	3	4
Vietnam	3	1	4
Total: 94 NOCs	156	104	260

* The International Olympic Committee and the International Weightlifting Federation (IWF) have decided to remove one quota place from Romania (men) and Uzbekistan (women) due to "multiple positive cases" of doping.
** On June 22, 2016, IWF further removed 11 quotas from 6 NOCs:

- Azerbaijan loses 1 man and 1 woman quota.
- Belarus loses 1 man quota.
- Kazakhstan, North Korea, and Russia each lose 1 man and 1 woman quota.
- Moldova loses 2 men quota.

*** On July 29, 2016, the IWF banned the entire Russian team (which had quota for eight athletes; five men and three women). The IWF then reallocated the quota as follows:

- Albania, Georgia, and Moldova each get a woman quota.
- Belgium, Croatia, El Salvador, Mongolia, and Serbia each get a man quota.

== Timeline ==
Event	Date	Venue
2014 World Championships	November 8–16, 2014	Almaty, Kazakhstan
2015 World Championships	November 20–28, 2015	Houston, United States
2016 European Championships	April 10–16, 2016	Førde, Norway
2016 Asian Championships	April 22–30, 2016	Tashkent, Uzbekistan
2016 African Championships	May 8–13, 2016	Yaoundé, Cameroon
2016 Oceania Championships	May 24–28, 2016	Suva, Fiji
2016 Pan American Championships	June 7–11, 2016	Cartagena, Colombia
Olympic Qualification Ranking List	June 20, 2016	—
Tripartite Commission Invitations	June 2016	—

Individual ranking events

Event	Date	Venue
2014 Commonwealth Games	July 24–31, 2014	(United Kingdom) Glasgow, Great Britain
2014 IWF Grand Prix – President's Cup	September 5–8, 2014	Noyabrsk, Russia
2014 Asian Games	September 20–26, 2014	Incheon, South Korea
2015 IWF Junior World Championships	June 6–13, 2015	Wrocław, Poland
2015 Pacific Games	July 5–8, 2015	Port Moresby, Papua New Guinea
2015 Pan American Games	July 11–15, 2015	Toronto, Canada
2015 African Games	September 7–9, 2015	(Republic of the Congo) Brazzaville, Congo
2015 IWF Grand Prix	September 21–23, 2015	Fuzhou, China
2015 IWF Grand Prix – President's Cup	December 12–13, 2015	Grozny, Russia
2016 IWF Grand Prix – President's Cup	March 18–20, 2016	Kazan, Russia
2016 IWF Grand Prix – Fajr Cup	May 31 – June 2, 2016	Tehran, Iran

== Men ==
Note: In the 2015 Qualification ranking, the IWF deleted Bulgaria (BUL) from the ranking list and recalculated all scores accordingly (i.e. as if Bulgarian athletes had not competed). If the same changes are made to the 2014 ranking, point scores were changed and ranking places were altered.

=== World Championships ===
- Teams 1st–6th: 6 athletes
- Teams 7th–12th: 5 athletes
- Teams 13th–18th: 4 athletes
- Teams 19th–24th: 3 athletes

Rank	Quota	NOC	Year	Category								Subtotal	Total
Rank	Quota	NOC	Year	56	62	69	77	85	94	105	+105	Subtotal	Total
1	6	Russia	2014			22		25+22	21	23	28+0	141	286
1	6	Russia	2015			25	22	28+23	0	25+22	0	145	286
2	6	China	2014	23+22	23	28	28	21	20	22		146	248
2	6	China	2015	25+0	28	28	21+0	0	0			102	248
3	6	Belarus	2014		20		22	20+19	22+16		21	124	246
3	6	Belarus	2015		20	17	10	20	28+0	16	21	122	246
4	6	Kazakhstan	2014	20		16	23		28+25	28	12+8	140	228
4	6	Kazakhstan	2015	0		13	28+19	0	0+0	28		88	228
5	6	Egypt	2014		19	25	20+18		15		23+17	122	214
5	6	Egypt	2015		8		25	13+9	18	9	18+0	92	214
6	6	North Korea	2014	28	28	23+17	25+21					142	213
6	6	North Korea	2015	28	21+0	22	0+0					71	213
7	5	Indonesia	2014	13	25+21	20+14	14	0				107	201
7	5	Indonesia	2015	17+15	22+14	16+10	0	3				94	201
8	5	Colombia	2014	16+15	22+0	10	0+0	8				71	190
8	5	Colombia	2015	21+18	25+23	11	9+0		21			119	190
9	5	Armenia	2014	9		21	12+7	13		19	13+0	87	188
9	5	Armenia	2015			15	23+0			21	23+19	101	188
10	5	Uzbekistan	2014		0	15		23+14		25+15	14	106	184
10	5	Uzbekistan	2015		7			18+11	6	18+17	7	78	184
11	5	Iran	2014	14		18+0		28+5		21+13	25	119	180
11	5	Iran	2015		2	0	0	25	22	0	12	61	180
12	5	Thailand	2014	18+6	17+1	13+0	0		9			64	167
12	5	Thailand	2015	20+19	10+6	9	20+18		16			103	167
13	4	Poland	2014					6	19+0	20+9	10+9	73	159
13	4	Poland	2015				13		25+20	20+0	8+0	86	159
14	4	Moldova	2014	12	18+9	0	19	15	17	17		98	158
14	4	Moldova	2015	3	11+0	12	17+0	17+0				60	158
15	4	Germany	2014			5	13+6	12		10+8	19+0	68	150
15	4	Germany	2015			6+5	15+7			15+11	20+14	82	150
16	4	Ukraine	2014					0	18+0	0	18+5	41	136
16	4	Ukraine	2015					22	23+14	19	13+4	95	136
17	4	South Korea	2014			11		18	10	18+7		64	136
17	4	South Korea	2015		17	0	11	15+0	17+12	0		72	136
18	4	France	2014			19+0		17+11	8			55	120
18	4	France	2015			18+0		16+12	9+8	2		65	120
19	3	Georgia	2014		7		0		5	4+0	20	36	109
19	3	Georgia	2015			0	5		11	10+3	28+16	73	109
20	3	Romania	2014		12+6	1	11					30	104
20	3	Romania	2015	0	15+4		12+8	21+14				74	104
21	3	Vietnam	2014	25+21			3	0	0			49	101
21	3	Vietnam	2015	23+12	12		0	5				52	101
22	3	Spain	2014	5	3	12+8	16+15	0+0				59	93
22	3	Spain	2015	16+0	0	8+0	4+0	6				34	93
23	3	Chinese Taipei	2014	19+10	8	6+0				6	1	50	91
23	3	Chinese Taipei	2015	9	3+0	7			0		22	41	91
24	3	Japan	2014	8+4	0+0	9				1+0	15	37	90
24	3	Japan	2015	11	19+0	3+0				12+8	0	53	90
25		United States	2014		13	4	8+0		12	3+0	7	47	89
25		United States	2015		0	14+0	3+1		15+0		9	42	89
26		Turkey	2014		5+0	0		0	0	5		10	85
26		Turkey	2015	8+5	18+16	23+2	0			5		75	85
27		Hungary	2014		15	0		0	0+0	12	16	43	67
27		Hungary	2015		0			0	0	13	11	24	67
28		Venezuela	2014	0	0	0	17	0	0			17	66
28		Venezuela	2015		13+1	0+0	14	0	7	14		49	66
29		Lithuania	2014					0	23+14	0	3+0	40	60
29		Lithuania	2015					4+0	10+0	6+0	0	20	60
30		Saudi Arabia	2014	17+0	16+11	0+0		0	1			45	55
30		Saudi Arabia	2015	0	5+0	4+1						10	55
31		Azerbaijan	2014	3	10				13			26	52
31		Azerbaijan	2015		0	0	0+0		19+0	7+0		26	52
32		Italy	2014	0	14			3				17	50
32		Italy	2015	14				19				33	50
33		Albania	2014		0		0+0	4+0	6+3			13	48
33		Albania	2015			19	16					35	48
34		Estonia	2014						0	0	22+0	22	47
34		Estonia	2015								25	25	47
35		Mexico	2014										47
35		Mexico	2015	13	9	20+0			5			47	47
36		Cuba	2014				10+9		7			26	46
36		Cuba	2015				6	10	0	4		20	46
37		Turkmenistan	2014			0	4+2	2	11			19	43
37		Turkmenistan	2015		0	0	0+0	7+0	0		17	24	43
38		Latvia	2014							16		16	39
38		Latvia	2015							23		23	39
39		Israel	2014					9			4	13	32
39		Israel	2015						13		6	19	32
40		Greece	2014		0		1	16+10	2			29	29
40		Greece	2015										29
41		Czech Republic	2014			0				0+0		0	28
41		Czech Republic	2015			0			3	0	15+10	28	28
42		Tunisia	2014										23
42		Tunisia	2015	0		21	2+0					23	23
43		Canada	2014				0	0			11	11	23
43		Canada	2015			0		8+2	2		0	12	23
44		Ecuador	2014	0		2+0				0+0	6	8	23
44		Ecuador	2015	10	0	0				0	5	15	23
45		Philippines	2014										22
45		Philippines	2015	22								22	22
46		Slovakia	2014					7+0		11+2	0	20	20
46		Slovakia	2015										20
47		India	2014	2	2	0	5+0	0				9	17
47		India	2015	7+1	0	0	0+0					8	17
48		Austria	2014							14		14	14
48		Austria	2015							0		0	14
49		Malaysia	2014	11		3						14	14
49		Malaysia	2015										14
50		Belgium	2014	7								7	13
50		Belgium	2015	6								6	13
51		Algeria	2014	0	4		0	0	4	0		8	8
51		Algeria	2015										8
52		Kyrgyzstan	2014		0	7		0				7	7
52		Kyrgyzstan	2015		0							0	7
53		Finland	2014					0	0		2	2	5
53		Finland	2015						1+0		2	3	5
54		Great Britain	2014		0	0			0			0	4
54		Great Britain	2015				0		4			4	4
55		Fiji	2014										4
55		Fiji	2015	4								4	4
56		Nauru	2014										3
56		Nauru	2015								3	3	3
57		Mongolia	2014		0							0	2
57		Mongolia	2015	2	0	0	0+0					2	2
58		Chile	2014	1								1	1
58		Chile	2015	0			0					0	1
59		Croatia	2014					0			0	0	1
59		Croatia	2015					1			0	1	1
60		Libya	2014					1				1	1
60		Libya	2015										1
61		Kiribati	2014										1
61		Kiribati	2015							1		1	1
62		Norway	2014										1
62		Norway	2015								1	1	1
—		American Samoa	2014										0
—		American Samoa	2015						0			0	0
—		Argentina	2014				0					0	0
—		Argentina	2015										0
—		Cyprus	2014			0						0	0
—		Cyprus	2015		0							0	0
—		Denmark	2014				0					0	0
—		Denmark	2015				0		0			0	0
—		Dominican Republic	2014										0
—		Dominican Republic	2015	0								0	0
—		El Salvador	2014										0
—		El Salvador	2015		0							0	0
—		Federated States of Micronesia	2014										0
—		Federated States of Micronesia	2015			0						0	0
—		Ghana	2014										0
—		Ghana	2015					0	0			0	0
—		Ireland	2014			0		0				0	0
—		Ireland	2015				0					0	0
—		Kosovo	2014										0
—		Kosovo	2015			0						0	0
—		Marshall Islands	2014										0
—		Marshall Islands	2015					0				0	0
—		New Zealand	2014										0
—		New Zealand	2015		0							0	0
—		Palau	2014										0
—		Palau	2015			0						0	0
—		Papua New Guinea	2014										0
—		Papua New Guinea	2015		0							0	0
—		Sri Lanka	2014										0
—		Sri Lanka	2015		0	0	0					0	0
—		Switzerland	2014										0
—		Switzerland	2015					0				0	0
—		Uganda	2014		0							0	0
—		Uganda	2015		0							0	0

=== European Championships ===
- Teams 1st–7th: 1 athlete

Rank	Quota	NOC	Category								Total
Rank	Quota	NOC	56	62	69	77	85	94	105	+105	Total
1	1	Turkey	25+23	28+25	28+25	25		25			156
2	1	Italy	28+21	20	22+0	20	28		14		139
3	1	Czech Republic	19+18	17	23			17	20	25+22	127
4	1	Hungary	17	23		18	16	14	23+12	23	120
5	1	Great Britain	16	22	19	23		20+16		18	118
6	1	Finland				22+19	22+18	19+0	11	13	113
7	1	Slovakia	20			21	19		19+17	17	113
8		Lithuania					17	28+22	22+21		110
9		Greece		19	21		25	15	18	9	107
10		Israel		18		17	20+14	0		20+14	103
11		Albania		21	0	0	23	23+21			88
12		Norway			20	0		12	16+13	15+10	86
13		Croatia	15				21	9	8	19+8	80
14		Latvia				28		18	28		74
15		Ireland					15+13	11+10	10+9		68
16		Denmark			18			13	15		46
17		Estonia								28	28
18		Austria							25		25
19		Belgium	22								22
20		Serbia								21	21
21		Kosovo			17						17
22		Malta				16					16
23		Sweden							0	16	16
24		Bosnia and Herzegovina						8			8
25		Cyprus		0			0				0

=== Asian Championships ===
- Teams 1st–7th: 1 athlete

Rank	Quota	NOC	Category								Total
Rank	Quota	NOC	56	62	69	77	85	94	105	+105	Total
1	1	Iraq		28+25	22+21	28+20		25	0		149
2	1	Malaysia	23+18	22+18	25	25+22			23		140
3	1	Kyrgyzstan			28+18	19+17	19	28	0	23	135
4	1	Syria		14			20	22	28+25	25	134
5	1	India	20	16	20	23	25+22	23		21	134
6	1	Turkmenistan		21	17	18	23+0	20		28+20	130
7	1	Saudi Arabia	21	23+17	23+0		21	21+0			126
8		Sri Lanka	22+19	19	19+0	21		19	22		122
9		Mongolia	25	20+13	14	16+0	16+15				106
10		Philippines	28+17	15+10	15		17				102
11		Tajikistan	16	11	16+13	15	18				89
12		Jordan			0			18		19	37
13		Afghanistan			12	0			21		33
14		Qatar					28				28
15		United Arab Emirates		9	0	14					23
16		Pakistan								22	22
17		Nepal		12							12
18		Yemen					0			0	0

=== African Championships ===
- Teams 1st–5th: 1 athlete

Rank	Quota	NOC	Category								Total
Rank	Quota	NOC	56	62	69	77	85	94	105	+105	Total
1	1	Tunisia	28	21	28+25	28+25	23	25			159
2	1	Algeria		22			28+25	28+0	25	28+25	159
3	1	Cameroon		25	23	23+22	0	23+22	28		144
4	1	Morocco	23	19	22	21	21	20	23	23	133
5	1	Ghana		18		19	22+20	21	22		122
6		Kenya			21+20	20		19			80
7		Madagascar	25	28							53
8		Equatorial Guinea			19	18					37
9		Uganda		23							23
10		Seychelles		20							20

=== Oceania Championships ===
- Teams 1st–5th: 1 athlete

Rank	Quota	NOC	Category								Total
Rank	Quota	NOC	56	62	69	77	85	94	105	+105	Total
1	1	Samoa		25		23	25	28+23	25+20	23	149
2	1	Australia				28+22	23+21	25+0	21	25	144
3	1	New Zealand			23	21	28	21	23+22	22+21	139
4	1	Kiribati	22	20	22	25	20		28		137
5	1	Fiji	28+23	23	0	20+18		20	18		132
6		Nauru	25	21+19	19	19+17				28	131
7		American Samoa						22	19	20	61
8		Solomon Islands		22	18		19				59
9		Tuvalu			21+20		17				58
10		Papua New Guinea		28	28						56
11		Federated States of Micronesia			25						25
12		Marshall Islands					22				22
13		Tonga						19			19
14		Guam					18				18
15		Palau			0						0

=== Pan American Championships ===
- Teams 1st–7th: 1 athlete

Rank	Quota	NOC	Category								Total
Rank	Quota	NOC	56	62	69	77	85	94	105	+105	Total
1	1	Cuba	22			28	28+25	25	20+19		148
2	1	Ecuador	20+17		25	23		21	23	28+23	143
3	1	Mexico	28	25	28	0		20	18	21+19	141
4	1	United States			0	21	20	28	25+22	25	141
5	1	Dominican Republic	25	21+19		20+15	22		17	22	129
6	1	Peru	21+19	22	23+20			15	21+15		126
7	1	Canada			19+0	16	23+19	22+17		18	118
8		Venezuela		0	0+0	25	21	23	28	20	117
9		Chile	18+16	23	21	22+14	16	14			116
10		Guatemala	23		18	18+17	17+15	12	16		109
11		Puerto Rico	15		22	19	18	16+13		16	106
12		Costa Rica	14			12+11	14	11+0		15	77
13		Honduras				13		18			31
14		El Salvador		28+0							28
15		Haiti		20							20
16		Argentina						19			19
17		Uruguay								17	17
18		Guyana					13				13

== Women ==
In the 2015 Qualification ranking, the IWF eliminated Bulgaria (BUL) from the ranking list and recalculated all scores accordingly, as if Bulgarian athletes had not been present at all. If the same changes are made to the 2014 ranking, point scores will change and ranking places may be altered.

=== World Championships ===
- Teams 1st–9th: 4 athletes
- Teams 10th–16th: 3 athletes
- Teams 17th–21st: 2 athletes

Rank	Quota	NOC	Year	Category							Subtotal	Total
Rank	Quota	NOC	Year	48	53	58	63	69	75	+75	Subtotal	Total
1	4	China	2014	28	23	28	28	23	25	25	109	221
1	4	China	2015	28	25	25	28	28	28	25	112	221
2	4	Russia	2014	–	–	14	25+16	20	28	28+21	102	201
2	4	Russia	2015	–	–	–	25	22+23	23+21	28	99	201
3	4	North Korea	2014	–	–	0	23+19	28	23+0	–	93	186
3	4	North Korea	2015	22+20	–	–	23	21	25	23	93	186
4	4	Kazakhstan	2014	0	28	–	20+1	25+19	21	–	94	183
4	4	Kazakhstan	2015	–	20	–	21	25+16	22	21+18	89	183
5	4	Thailand	2014	23	22	25+23	21	–	–	23+22	94	180
5	4	Thailand	2015	14	22+21	21	19	–	–	22	86	180
6	4	Chinese Taipei	2014	–	25	21+13	22	–	16	–	84	176
6	4	Chinese Taipei	2015	21	28	23+16	20	–	12	–	92	176
7	4	Colombia	2014	–	20+15	22+20	15	21	20	–	83	157
7	4	Colombia	2015	10	17+12	20	18	–	19	–	74	157
8	4	Japan	2014	10+0	18+17	18	–	–	8	17	70	134
8	4	Japan	2015	23	13	18	10+7	–	–	–	64	134
9	4	Ukraine	2014	17	21	12	17+9	12		18	73	132
9	4	Ukraine	2015	9	18	1	22	2	8	11	59	132
10	3	South Korea	2014	19+12	12	–	5	16		19	66	129
10	3	South Korea	2015	19+4	10	4	–	–	15	19+10	63	129
11	3	Belarus	2014	3	–	3	18+12	22+14	15		69	125
11	3	Belarus	2015	–	–	^{[BLR]}	–	17+19	20	–	56	125
12	3	Egypt	2014	–	14	11	14	11	–	20+15	63	112
12	3	Egypt	2015	–	0	–	8	20	4	16+5	49	112
13	3	Venezuela	2014	–	2	17+8	0	–	13	16	53	111
13	3	Venezuela	2015	–	15+9	15	–	1	–	15+13	58	111
14	3	United States	2014	16+4	–	7	10	13	–	13+6	52	109
14	3	United States	2015	3	–	9	–	10	18	20+3	57	109
15	3	Mexico	2014	6	–	15	3	–	10	14	45	98
15	3	Mexico	2015	–	–	13+10	16	5+8	14	8	53	98
16	3	Turkey	2014	25+0	10	–	6+0	4+0	–	–	44	96
16	3	Turkey	2015	18+6	14+11	–	3	–	–	–	52	96
17	2	Dominican Republic	2014	20+9	16	0	–	–	–	–	45	90
17	2	Dominican Republic	2015	15	0	17	–	–	11+2	–	43	90
18	2	Ecuador	2014	2	–	10	13	–	–	12	37	90
18	2	Ecuador	2015	–	–	19	–	14	13+6	7+2	53	90
19	2	Armenia	2014	1	6	–	8+0	17		11	42	84
19	2	Armenia	2015	–	0	11	–	12	7	12	42	84
20	2	Indonesia	2014	22	11	–	–	4	–	7	44	82
20	2	Indonesia	2015	16	8+2	–	12	–	–	–	38	82
21	2	Romania	2014	–	–	19+6	–	–	–	10	35	78
21	2	Romania	2015	7	–	12	–	7	–	17	43	78
22		France	2014	14	3	2	–	–	19	2	38	76
22		France	2015	11+8	–	2	–	–	17	0	38	76
23		Italy	2014	21	9	9	11	9	3	1	50	75
23		Italy	2015	5	1	5	14	–	–	–	25	75
24		India	2014	15	1	–	6+0	–	5	–	27	74
24		India	2015	17+12	7	–	11	–	–	–	47	74
25		Poland	2014	7	–	16	2	0	–	8+4	35	67
25		Poland	2015	–	0	12+8	–	3	9	0+0	32	67
26		Azerbaijan	2014	–	19+0	–	0	–	–	–	19	60
26		Azerbaijan	2015	–	–	28	–	13	–	–	41	60
27		Spain	2014	8	7	0	0	8	22	–	45	58
27		Spain	2015	0	4	0	0	9	–	–	13	58
28		Uzbekistan	2014	5+0	0	5	–	0	–	–	10	56
28		Uzbekistan	2015	–	19+5	7	–	15	5	–	46	56
29		Great Britain	2014	–	–	–	0+0	10	9	–	19	49
29		Great Britain	2015	–	–	–	17+13	–	–	0	30	49
30		Canada	2014	–	4	–	–	7	17+12	–	40	44
30		Canada	2015	0	–	0	–	4	–	–	4	44
31		Mongolia	2014	–	0+0	–	–	18+2	–	–	20	41
31		Mongolia	2015	–	0+0	0	0	18	3	–	21	41
32		Germany	2014	–	13	–	7	–	11+7	0	38	40
32		Germany	2015	2	–	–	–	0	–	–	2	40
33		Chile	2014	–	–	–	–	–	14+2	–	16	32
33		Chile	2015	–	–	–	–	–	16	–	16	32
34		Australia	2014	–	8+0	0	0	–	4	9+5	26	30
34		Australia	2015	–	3	0	0+0	–	1	0	4	30
35		Moldova	2014	–	–	–	–	–	18	–	18	28
35		Moldova	2015	–	–	–	–	–	10	–	10	28
36		Norway	2014	–	–	–	–	15	–	–	15	26
36		Norway	2015	–	–	–	–	11	–	–	11	26
37		Nigeria	2014	–	–	–	–	–	–	–		24
37		Nigeria	2015	–	–	–	15	–	–	9	24	24
38		Vietnam	2014	–				–			–	24
38		Vietnam	2015	24	–	–	–	–	–	–	24	24
39		Philippines	2014	–				–			–	23
39		Philippines	2015	–	23	–	–	–	–	–	23	23
40		Latvia	2014	–	5	–	–	–	–	–	5	21
40		Latvia	2015	–	16	–	–	–	–	–	16	21
41		Sweden	2014	–				–			–	21
41		Sweden	2015	–	–	6	9	6	–	–	21	21
42		Albania	2014	18	–	–	0	–	–	–	18	18
42		Albania	2015	–	–	–	–	–	–	–		18
43		Mauritius	2014	–	–	1	–	–	–	3	4	17
43		Mauritius	2015	13	–	–	–	–	–	0	13	17
44		Georgia	2014	–	–	–	–	–	–	–		14
44		Georgia	2015	–	–	–	0	–	–	14	14	14
45		Puerto Rico	2014	13	–	–	–	–	–	–	13	13
45		Puerto Rico	2015	–	–	–	–	–	–	–		13
46		Kyrgyzstan	2014	11	–	–	–	–	–	–	11	12
46		Kyrgyzstan	2015	1	–	–	–	–	–	–		12
47		Greece	2014	–	–	4+0	–	–	–	–	4	10
47		Greece	2015	–	–	–	–	–	–	6	6	10
48		Hungary	2014	–	–	0	0+0	1	6	–	7	7
48		Hungary	2015	–	–	–	–	–	–	–		7
49		Papua New Guinea	2014	–				–			–	6
49		Papua New Guinea	2015	–	6	–	–	–	–	–	6	6
50		South Africa	2014	–				–			–	6
50		South Africa	2015	–	–	–	6	–	–	–	6	6
51		Czech Republic	2014	–	0	–	–	5	–	–	5	5
51		Czech Republic	2015	–	–	–	–	–	–	–		5
52		Finland	2014	–	0	–	0	3	–	–	3	5
52		Finland	2015	–	0	0	–	2	–	–	2	5
53		Lebanon	2014	–	–	–	0	–	–	–	0	5
53		Lebanon	2015	–	–	–	5	–	–	–	5	5
54		Cuba	2014	–	–	–	–	–	–	–		4
54		Cuba	2015	–	–	0	4	–	–	–	4	4
55		Tunisia	2014	–	–	–	–	–	–	–		4
55		Tunisia	2015	–	–	–	–	–	–	4	4	4
56		Solomon Islands	2014	–	–	–	–	–	–	–	–	3
56		Solomon Islands	2015	–	–	3	–	–	–	–	3	3
57		New Zealand	2014	–	–	–	–	–	–	–		1
57		New Zealand	2015	–	–	–	–	0	–	1	1	1
58		Seychelles	2014	–	–	–	–	–	–	–		0
58		Seychelles	2015	–	–	–	1	–	–	–	1	0
—		Netherlands	2014	–	–	–	–	0	–	–	0	0
—		Netherlands	2015	–	–	–	–	–	–	–		0
—		Croatia	2014	–	–	0	0	–	–	–	0	0
—		Croatia	2015	–	–	–	–	–	–	–		0
—		United Arab Emirates	2014	–	–	0	–	–	–	–	0	0
—		United Arab Emirates	2015	–	–	–	–	–	–	–		0
—		Israel	2014	–	–	–	–	–	–	–		0
—		Israel	2015	–	0	–	–	–	–	–	0	0
—		Hong Kong	2014	–	–	–	–	–	–	–		0
—		Hong Kong	2015	–	0	–	–	–	–	–	0	0
—		Nicaragua	2014	–	–	–	–	–	–	–		0
—		Nicaragua	2015	–	0	–	0	–	–	–	0	0
—		Uruguay	2014	–	–	–	–	–	–	–		0
—		Uruguay	2015	–	0	–	–	–	–	–	0	0
—		Denmark	2014	–	–	–	–	–	–	–		0
—		Denmark	2015	–	0	0	–	–	–	–	0	0
—		Marshall Islands	2014	–	–	–	–	–	–	–		0
—		Marshall Islands	2015	–	–	0	–	–	–	–	0	0
—		Iceland	2014	–	–	–	–	–	–	–		0
—		Iceland	2015	–	–	0	0	–	–	–	0	0
—		Ireland	2014	–	–	–	–	–	–	–		0
—		Ireland	2015	–	–	0+0	–	–	–	–	0	0
—		Aruba	2014	–	–	–	–	–	–	–		0
—		Aruba	2015	–	–	–	0	–	–	–	0	0
—		Cyprus	2014	–	–	–	–	–	–	–		0
—		Cyprus	2015	–	–	–	0	–	–	–	0	0
—		Belgium	2014	–	–	–	–	–	–	–		0
—		Belgium	2015	–	–	–	–	–	–	0	0	0
—		Cook Islands	2014	–	–	–	–	–	–	–		0
—		Cook Islands	2015	–	–	–	–	–	–	0	0	0

=== European Championships ===
- Teams 1st–6th: 1 athlete

Rank	Quota	NOC	Category							Total
Rank	Quota	NOC	48	53	58	63	69	75	+75	Total
1	1	Great Britain	19	16	21	25+23	28	–	25	101
2	1	Italy	28+18	21	20	28	21	18	–	98
3	1	Poland	–	–	25+0	22	25	22	23+0	95
4	1	France	25+0	–	22	–	–	28	20	95
5	1	Germany	–	22	–	18+13	22	23+19	22	89
6	1	Spain	23	23	19+17	20+16	18	–	–	85
7		Sweden	–	–	23	0	23	15	18+13	79
8		Finland	17	18	15	21+19	–	20	19	79
9		Azerbaijan	20	12	28	14	–	–	–	74
10		Hungary	–	13	–	12	19	17+16	21+17	74
11		Greece	21+15	–	18	15	–	–	–	69
12		Norway	–	19+15	13	17+10	–	–	–	64
13		Czech Republic	16+13	–	–	16	20+0	–	1614	65
14		Israel	–	20	11+0	11	–	–	15+12	58
15		Ireland	14	11+10	–	7	15+14	–	–	54
16		Denmark	–	17	12	5	16	–	–	50
17		Albania	22	25	–	–	–	–	–	47
18		Iceland	–	–	16	9+8	–	–	–	33
19		Croatia			14		17			31
20		Georgia							28	28
20		Latvia	–	28	–	–	–	–	–	28
22		Moldova						25		25
23		Belgium						21		21
24		Lithuania		14						14
25		Netherlands		0		4				4
26		Estonia							0	0

=== Asian Championships ===
- Teams 1st–6th: 1 athlete

Rank	Quota	NOC	Category							Total
Rank	Quota	NOC	48	53	58	63	69	75	+75	Total
1	1	Vietnam	28+23	23	28+0	28	28			112
2	0 *	Uzbekistan		25	23	23	18	25+20	28	101
3	1	India	25+22		25	25	25	0	25	100
4	1	Mongolia	18+16	20		22		28+23	23	96
5	1	Philippines	19	28+21			23			91
6	1	Turkmenistan	20	16		19	22+19	22		83
7		United Arab Emirates	15	15	22	15	16		22+21	81
8		Iraq	17	19	19	20		19		77
9		Kyrgyzstan	21	17	20+17	18+16	17			76
10		Bangladesh		18	18	17	20			73
11		Syria					21	21		42
12		Hong Kong		22						22
13		Jordan			21					21
13		Lebanon				21				21

=== African Championships ===
- Teams 1st–4th: 1 athlete

Rank	Quota	NOC	Category							Total
Rank	Quota	NOC	48	53	58	63	69	75	+75	Total
1	1	Nigeria	23	25	28+25	28		28	28	112
2	1	Tunisia	25+19	28	19	25			25+0	103
3	1	Cameroon			22	20	28	22+21	22+21	94
4	1	Algeria			21	22	25+20	25		93
5		Morocco	21	22	18+17	21		23	20	87
6		Madagascar	22+20		20	23	19			85
7		Kenya			16	19	23	20		78
8		Mauritius	28				22		23	73
9		Seychelles			23		21			44
10		Ghana		23						23

=== Oceania Championships ===
- Teams 1st–4th: 1 athlete

Rank	Quota	NOC	Category							Total
Rank	Quota	NOC	48	53	58	63	69	75	+75	Total
1	1	Australia	28		23+22	28+25		25+23		106
2	1	Samoa					22	28+21	28+21	99
3	1	New Zealand		28+23	23	23+0	23	22	25	99
4	1	Fiji	23	22		22	28+25	0	19	98
5		Solomon Islands	21	25	25	0			16	87
6		American Samoa						19	22+20	61
7		Cook Islands						20	23+17	60
8		Nauru	22				0		18	40
9		Marshall Islands			28					28
10		Papua New Guinea	25							25
11		Tuvalu						18		18

=== Pan American Championships ===
- Teams 1st–4th: 1 athlete

Rank	Quota	NOC	Category							Total
Rank	Quota	NOC	48	53	58	63	69	75	+75	Total
1	1	Canada	28		28		28+23	25		109
2	1	Puerto Rico	25	28	17	22		21	28	103
3	1	Chile		25	21		21+20	28	25+23	101
4	1	Cuba	22	22+21	25	28	22	22		97
5		Argentina		16	23	25+19			22	89
6		Peru	23	17	22+19	21	19+18			85
7		Guatemala	21	18	20+16	20			20+19	81
8		Panama	19+18	15	13	17	25	18		80
9		Costa Rica			15+14	0	17	23+19	21	80
10		El Salvador		23+19	18			20		80
11		Nicaragua	20	0		23			18	61
12		Uruguay		20						20
13		Aruba				18				18

=== Notes ===
- ^{BLR} Nastassia Novikava's 4th-place finish in the 58 kg discipline during the 2015 IWF World Championships was invalidated due to a positive doping test.

== Individual qualification ==
Eight places for men and seven places for women are allocated based on the Olympic Qualification Ranking Lists. Individual quota places are allocated to the athletes, ranked in the top 15 places for men and the top 10 places for women in each bodyweight category, from NOCs which have not gained any quota place(s) through the Main or Continental Qualification Events.

=== Men ===
Standings after Pan American Championships

No.	Weight	Name	Record	Meet	Rank	Note
1	94 kg	Aurimas Didžbalis (LTU)	399	2014 World Championships	4	
2	56 kg	Nestor Colonia (PHI)	282	2015 World Championships	5	
3	105 kg	Artūrs Plēsnieks (LAT)	405	2015 World Championships	5	
4	+105 kg	Mart Seim (EST)	438	2015 World Championships	6	
5	69 kg	Briken Calja (ALB)	326	2015 World Championships	10	
6	94 kg	Rovshan Fatullayev (AZE)	355	2015 World Championships	12	^{[AZE]}
7	62 kg	Jesús López (VEN)	284	2015 World Championships	14	
8	85 kg	Antonis Martasidis (CYP)	355	2014 World Championships	15	

=== Women ===
Standings after Pan American Championships

No.	Weight	Name	Record	Meet	Rank	Note
1	58 kg	Boyanka Kostova (AZE)	252	2015 World Championships	1	^{[AZE]}
2	Did not allocate					
3	Did not allocate					
4	Did not allocate					
5	Did not allocate					
6	Did not allocate					
7	Did not allocate					

Notes:

- ^{AZE} : Azerbaijan was stripped of a quota for men and women; as the country does not have any quota for either gender as an NOC, no athlete is eligible for the Games.

== Tripartite commission invitations ==
=== Men ===
No.	Weight	Name
1	62 kg	Edouard Joseph (HAI)
2	62 kg	Morea Baru (PNG)
3	62 kg	Rick Confiance (SEY)
4	85 kg	Kyle Micallef (MLT)
5	94 kg	Tanumafili Jungblut (ASA)
6	94 kg	Cristopher Pavón (HON)

=== Women ===
No.	Weight	Name
1	53 kg	Scarleth Mercado (NCA)
2	58 kg	Mathlynn Sasser (MHL)
3	63 kg	Elisa Ravololoniaina (MAD)
4	+75 kg	Luisa Peters (COK)

== Reallocation of unused quota places ==
On June 23, 2016, the International Weightlifting Federation announced the re-allocation of 20 unused quota places. On July 29, 2016, the IWF announced more re-allocation of unused quota places.

=== Men ===
No.	NOC
1	Austria
2	Chile
3	Greece
4	Guatemala
5	Israel
6	Kenya
7	Nauru
8	Qatar
9	Sri Lanka
10	Belgium
11	Croatia
12	El Salvador
13	Mongolia
14	Serbia

=== Women ===
No.	NOC
1	Argentina
2	Finland
3	Kyrgyzstan
4	Latvia
5	Mauritius
6	Morocco
7	Peru
8	Solomon Islands
9	Sweden
10	United Arab Emirates
11	Uruguay
12	Albania
13	Georgia
14	Moldova
