= Mongolia at the 2016 Summer Olympics =

- IOC code: MGL
- NOC: Mongolian National Olympic Committee
- Website: www.olympic.mn (in Mongolian)

in Rio de Janeiro
- Competitors: 43 in 9 sports
- Flag bearer: Temuulengiin Battulga
- Medals Ranked 67th: Gold 0 Silver 1 Bronze 1 Total 2

Summer Olympics appearances (overview)
- 1964; 1968; 1972; 1976; 1980; 1984; 1988; 1992; 1996; 2000; 2004; 2008; 2012; 2016; 2020; 2024

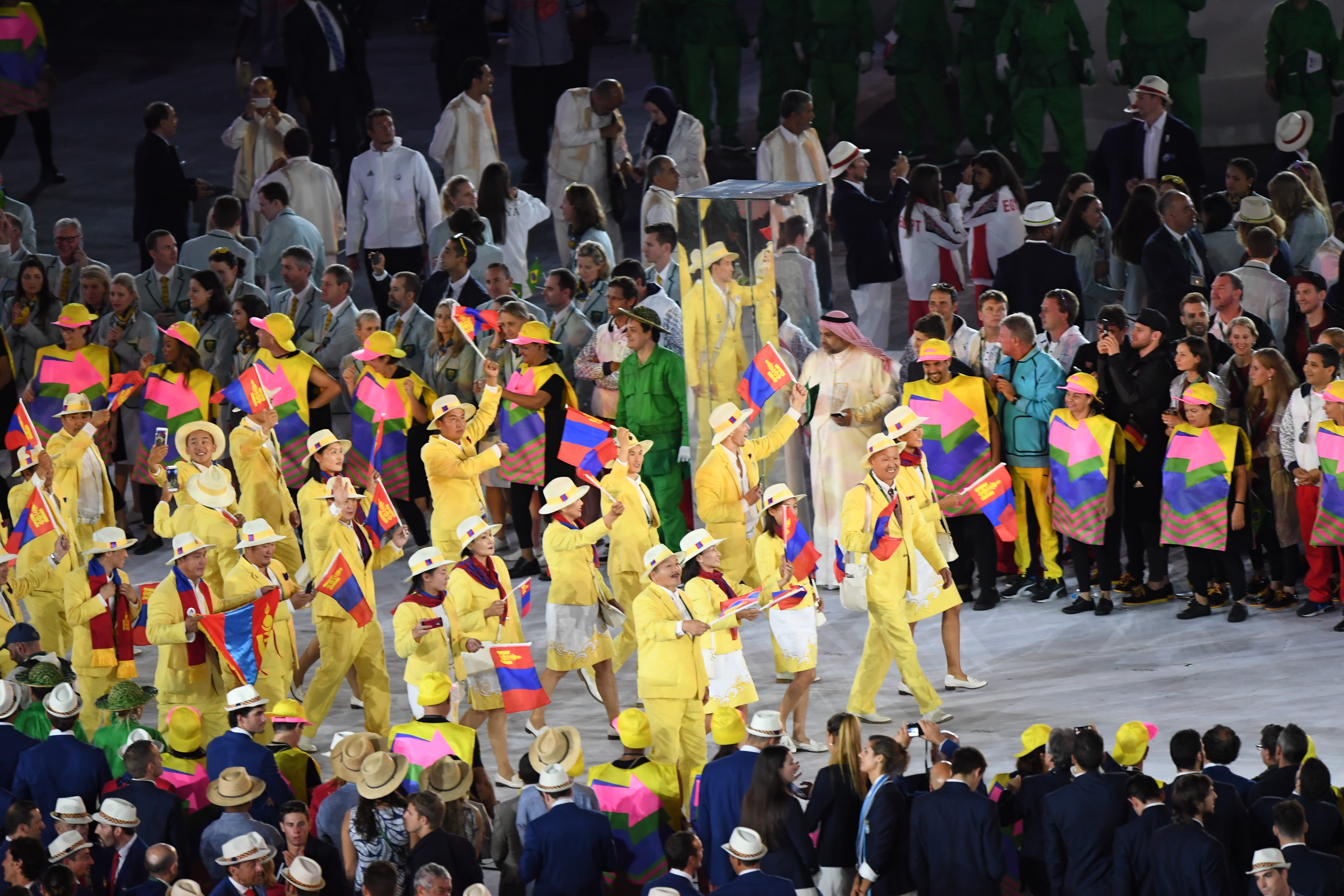

Mongolia competed at the 2016 Summer Olympics in Rio de Janeiro, Brazil, from 5 to 21 August 2016. Since the nation made its debut in 1964, Mongolian athletes had appeared in every edition of the Summer Olympic Games, with the exception of the 1984 Summer Olympics in Los Angeles, because of its partial support to the Soviet boycott.

The Mongolian National Olympic Committee fielded a team of 43 athletes, 26 men and 17 women, across nine different sports at the Games. It was the nation's largest delegation sent to the Olympics in a non-boycotting edition, tying the record with the number of athletes achieved in Moscow 1980. Among the sporting events represented by the nation's athletes, Mongolia marked its Olympic debut in taekwondo, as well as its return to weightlifting after an eight-year hiatus.

The Mongolian roster featured 11 returning Olympians, with only three of them having won medals at the previous editions of the Games: judoka Naidangiin Tüvshinbayar, who emerged as the nation's most decorated athlete with two medals; freestyle wrestler Soronzonboldyn Battsetseg, who obtained the bronze in the women's 63 kg division, and pistol shooter Otryadyn Gündegmaa, who established a historic record as the first Mongolian to participate in six Olympics. Other notable Mongolian athletes featured Asian Games champion Dorjnyambuugiin Otgondalai in men's lightweight boxing, marathon runner and four-time Olympian Bat-Ochir Ser-Od, and heavyweight judoka Temuulengiin Battulga, who was selected by the committee as the nation's flag bearer in the opening ceremony.

Mongolia left Rio de Janeiro with only two medals (one silver and one bronze); each was awarded to Otgondalai and lightweight judoka Dorjsürengiin Sumiyaa (women's 57 kg). Several Mongolian athletes narrowly missed out of the podium, including judokas Mönkhbatyn Urantsetseg and Lkhagvasürengiin Otgonbaatar, who both placed fifth in their respective weight categories, and freestyle wrestler Ganzorigiin Mandakhnaran, who controversially lost the bronze medal match to Uzbekistan's Ikhtiyor Navruzov in the men's 65 kg division, provoking a protest against the decision by his coaches while stripping their clothes off.

== Medalists ==
| Medal | Name | Sport | Event | Date |
|---|---|---|---|---|
| Silver | Dorjsürengiin Sumiyaa | Judo | Women's 57 kg | 8 August |
| Bronze | Dorjnyambuugiin Otgondalai | Boxing | Men's lightweight | 14 August |

== Archery ==
One Mongolian archer qualified for the men's individual recurve by obtaining one of the three Olympic places available from the 2015 Asian Archery Championships in Bangkok, Thailand.

| Athlete | Event | Ranking round | | Round of 64 | Round of 32 | Round of 16 | Quarterfinals | Semifinals | Final / BM | |
| Athlete | Event | Score | Seed | Opposition Score | Opposition Score | Opposition Score | Opposition Score | Opposition Score | Opposition Score | Rank |
|---|---|---|---|---|---|---|---|---|---|---|
| Jantsangiin Gantögs | Men's individual | 664 | 24 | Thamwong (THA); L 3–7 | Did not advance | | | | | |

== Athletics ==
Mongolian athletes have so far achieved qualifying standards in the following athletics events (up to a maximum of 3 athletes in each event):

Key

- Note–Ranks given for track events are within the athlete's heat only
- Q = Qualified for the next round
- q = Qualified for the next round as a fastest loser or, in field events, by position without achieving the qualifying target
- NR = National record
- N/A = Round not applicable for the event
- Bye = Athlete not required to compete in round

Track & road events

| Athlete | Event | Final | |
| Athlete | Event | Result | Rank |
|---|---|---|---|
| Bat-Ochir Ser-Od | Men's marathon | 2:24:26 | 92 |
| Gantulga Dambadarjaa | Men's marathon | 2:27:42 | 107 |
| Tseveenravdan Byambajav | Men's marathon | 2:36:14 | 130 |
| Bayartsogt Munkhzayaa | Women's marathon | 2:43:55 | 72 |
| Luvsanlkhündegiin Otgonbayar | Women's marathon | 2:45:55 | 85 |

== Boxing ==
Mongolia has entered six boxers to compete in each of the following weight classes into the Olympic boxing tournament. Gankhuyagiin Gan-Erdene, Baatarsükhiin Chinzorig, 2012 Olympian Byambyn Tüvshinbat, and Asian Games champion Dorjnyambuugiin Otgondalai had claimed their Olympic spots at the 2016 Asia & Oceania Qualification Tournament in Qian'an, China.

Kharkhüügiin Enkh-Amar and Erdenebatyn Tsendbaatar earned additional Olympic places for the Mongolian roster at the 2016 AIBA World Qualifying Tournament in Baku, Azerbaijan.

| Athlete | Event | Round of 32 | Round of 16 | Quarterfinals | Semifinals | Final | |
| Athlete | Event | Opposition Result | Opposition Result | Opposition Result | Opposition Result | Opposition Result | Rank |
|---|---|---|---|---|---|---|---|
| Gankhuyagiin Gan-Erdene | Men's light flyweight | Bye | Quipo (ECU); L 0–3 | Did not advance | | | |
| Kharkhüügiin Enkh-Amar | Men's flyweight | Emigdio (MEX); L 0–3 | Did not advance | | | | |
| Erdenebatyn Tsendbaatar | Men's bantamweight | Gicharu (KEN); W 3–0 | Asanau (BLR); W 3–1 | Stevenson (USA); L 0–3 | Did not advance | | |
| Dorjnyambuugiin Otgondalai | Men's lightweight | Bye | Lacruz (NED); W 2–1 | Benbaziz (ALG); W 3–0 | Oumiha (FRA); L 0–3 | Did not advance | 3rd place, bronze medalist(s) |
| Baatarsükh Chinzorig | Men's light welterweight | Tharumalingam (QAT); W 3–0 | Dunaytsev (RUS); L 0–3 | Did not advance | | | |
| Byambyn Tüvshinbat | Men's welterweight | Palmetta (ARG); W 3–0 | Donnelly (IRL); L 1–2 | Did not advance | | | |

== Judo ==
Mongolia has qualified a total of 13 judokas for each of the following weight classes at the Games. Twelve of them (seven men and five women), led by two-time Olympic medalist Naidangiin Tüvshinbayar, were ranked among the top 22 eligible judokas for men and top 14 for women in the IJF World Ranking List of 30 May 2016, while London 2012 Olympian Pürevjargalyn Lkhamdegd at women's half-heavyweight (78 kg) earned a continental quota spot from the Asian region, as the highest-ranked Mongolian judoka outside of direct qualifying position.

Men

| Athlete | Event | Round of 64 | Round of 32 | Round of 16 | Quarterfinals | Semifinals | Repechage | Final / BM | |
| Athlete | Event | Opposition Result | Opposition Result | Opposition Result | Opposition Result | Opposition Result | Opposition Result | Opposition Result | Rank |
|---|---|---|---|---|---|---|---|---|---|
| Tsogtbaataryn Tsend-Ochir | −60 kg | Ramos (GUA); W 100–000 | Reinvall (FIN); W 011–000 | Kim W-j (KOR); L 001–010 | Did not advance | | | | |
| Davaadorjiin Tömörkhüleg | −66 kg | Bye | Hamad (KSA); W 100–000 | Zourdani (ALG); W 101–000 | Basile (ITA); L 000–100 | Did not advance | Bouchard (CAN); L 000–010 | Did not advance | 7 |
| Ganbaataryn Odbayar | −73 kg | Bye | Mohy Eldin (EGY); W 100–001 | Delpopolo (USA); L 000–010 | Did not advance | | | | |
| Otgonbaataryn Uuganbaatar | −81 kg | Bye | Abdelaal (EGY); L 000–101 | Did not advance | | | | | |
| Lkhagvasürengiin Otgonbaatar | −90 kg | Bye | van 't End (NED); W 100–000 | González (CUB); W 100–000 | Liparteliani (GEO); L 100–000 | Did not advance | Mehdiyev (AZE); W 001–000 | Cheng Xz (CHN); L 000–001 | 5 |
| Naidangiin Tüvshinbayar | −100 kg | Bye | Armenteros (CUB); L 000–001 | Did not advance | | | | | |
| Temuulengiin Battulga | +100 kg | — | Tayeb (ALG); L 000–010 | Did not advance | | | | | |

Women

| Athlete | Event | Round of 32 | Round of 16 | Quarterfinals | Semifinals | Repechage | Final / BM | |
| Athlete | Event | Opposition Result | Opposition Result | Opposition Result | Opposition Result | Opposition Result | Opposition Result | Rank |
|---|---|---|---|---|---|---|---|---|
| Mönkhbatyn Urantsetseg | −48 kg | Bye | Payet (FRA); W 100–000 | Jeong B-k (KOR); L 000–101 | Did not advance | Menezes (BRA); W 100–000 | Kondo (JPN); L 000–000 S | 5 |
| Adiyaasambuugiin Tsolmon | −52 kg | Delgado (USA); W 010–003 | Nakamura (JPN); L 000–100 | Did not advance | | | | |
| Dorjsürengiin Sumiyaa | −57 kg | Bye | Verhagen (NED); W 000–000 S | Monteiro (POR); W 000–000 S | Matsumoto (JPN); W 010–000 | Bye | R Silva (BRA); L 000–010 | 2nd place, silver medalist(s) |
| Tsedevsürengiin Mönkhzayaa | −63 kg | Zouak (MAR); W 101–000 | Yang Jx (CHN); L 001–100 | Did not advance | | | | |
| Tsend-Ayuushiin Naranjargal | −70 kg | Stam (GEO); L 000–011 | Did not advance | | | | | |
| Pürevjargalyn Lkhamdegd | −78 kg | Joó (HUN); L 000–111 | Did not advance | | | | | |

== Shooting ==
Mongolian shooters have achieved quota places for the following events by virtue of their best finishes at the 2015 ISSF World Cup series, and Asian Championships, as long as they obtained a minimum qualifying score (MQS) by 31 March 2016.

| Athlete | Event | Qualification | | Semifinal | | Final | |
| Athlete | Event | Points | Rank | Points | Rank | Points | Rank |
|---|---|---|---|---|---|---|---|
| Gankhuyagiin Nandinzayaa | Women's 10 m air rifle | 414.8 | 14 | — | | Did not advance | |
| Gankhuyagiin Nandinzayaa | Women's 50 m rifle 3 positions | 582 | 9 | — | | Did not advance | |
| Otryadyn Gündegmaa | Women's 10 m air pistol | 379 | 20 | — | | Did not advance | |
| Otryadyn Gündegmaa | Women's 25 m pistol | 579 | 12 | Did not advance | | | |
| Tsogbadrakhyn Mönkhzul | Women's 10 m air pistol | 378 | 32 | — | | Did not advance | |
| Tsogbadrakhyn Mönkhzul | Women's 25 m pistol | 580 | 11 | Did not advance | | | |

Qualification Legend: Q = Qualify for the next round; q = Qualify for the bronze medal (shotgun)

== Swimming ==
Mongolia has received a Universality invitation from FINA to send two swimmers (one male and one female) to the Olympics.

| Athlete | Event | Heat | | Semifinal | | Final | |
| Athlete | Event | Time | Rank | Time | Rank | Time | Rank |
|---|---|---|---|---|---|---|---|
| Batsaikhany Dulguun | Men's 50 m freestyle | 24.90 | 60 | Did not advance | | | |
| Yesuin Bayar | Women's 50 m freestyle | 28.40 | 60 | Did not advance | | | |

== Taekwondo ==
Mongolia entered one athlete into the taekwondo competition for the first time at the Olympics. Pürevjavyn Temüüjin secured a spot in the men's lightweight category (68 kg) by virtue of his top two finish at the 2016 Asian Qualification Tournament in Manila, Philippines.

| Athlete | Event | Round of 16 | Quarterfinals | Semifinals | Repechage | Final / BM | |
| Athlete | Event | Opposition Result | Opposition Result | Opposition Result | Opposition Result | Opposition Result | Rank |
|---|---|---|---|---|---|---|---|
| Pürevjavyn Temüüjin | Men's −68 kg | Gutiérrez (MEX); W 12–11 | González (ESP); L 4–7 | Did not advance | | | |

== Weightlifting ==
Mongolia has qualified one female weightlifter for the Rio Olympics by virtue of a top six national finish at the 2016 Asian Championships. The team must allocate this place by 20 June 2016.

Meanwhile, an unused men's Olympic spot was awarded to the Mongolian team by IWF, as a result of Russia's complete ban from the Games due to the "multiple positive cases" of doping.

| Athlete | Event | Snatch | | Clean & Jerk | | Total | Rank |
| Athlete | Event | Result | Rank | Result | Rank | Total | Rank |
|---|---|---|---|---|---|---|---|
| Ösökhbayaryn Chagnaadorj | Men's −56 kg | ~~103~~ | DNF | — | — | — | DNF |
| Mönkhjantsangiin Ankhtsetseg | Women's −69 kg | 106 | 7 | 131 | 8 | 237 | 8 |

== Wrestling ==
Mongolia has qualified a total of nine wrestlers for each of the following weight classes into the Olympic tournament. Five Olympic berths were awarded to Mongolian wrestlers, who finished among the top six at the 2015 World Championships, while the other half of the wrestling roster had booked Olympic spots by progressing to the top two finals at the 2016 Asian Qualification Tournament.

One further wrestler had claimed the remaining Olympic slot in the men's freestyle 97 kg to round out the Mongolian roster at the final meet of the World Qualification Tournament in Istanbul.

On 11 May 2016, United World Wrestling decided to revoke an Olympic license from Mongolia in women's freestyle 53 kg, due to doping violations at the Asian Qualification Tournament, but the license was reinstated two months later, following the recent meldonium guidelines released by IOC and WADA.

Key:

- VT – Victory by Fall.
- PP – Decision by Points – the loser with technical points.
- PO – Decision by Points – the loser without technical points.
- ST – Technical superiority – the loser without technical points and a margin of victory of at least 8 (Greco-Roman) or 10 (freestyle) points.

Men's freestyle

| Athlete | Event | Qualification | Round of 16 | Quarterfinal | Semifinal | Repechage 1 | Repechage 2 | Final / BM | |
| Athlete | Event | Opposition Result | Opposition Result | Opposition Result | Opposition Result | Opposition Result | Opposition Result | Opposition Result | Rank |
|---|---|---|---|---|---|---|---|---|---|
| Erdenebatyn Bekhbayar | −57 kg | Diatta (SEN); L 1–3 ^{PP} | Did not advance | | | | | | 14 |
| Ganzorigiin Mandakhnaran | −65 kg | Dutt (IND); W 3–0 ^{PO} | Katai (CHN); W 3–0 ^{PO} | Ramonov (RUS); L 0–3 ^{PO} | Did not advance | Bye | Garcia (CAN); W 3–0 ^{PO} | Navruzov (UZB); L 1–3 ^{PP} | 5 |
| Pürevjavyn Önörbat | −74 kg | Bye | Demirtaş (TUR); L 1–3 ^{PP} | Did not advance | | | | | 15 |
| Orgodolyn Üitümen | −86 kg | Ganev (BUL); L 0–5 ^{VT} | Did not advance | | | | | | 15 |
| Dorjkhandyn Khüderbulga | −97 kg | Bye | Musaev (KGZ); L 0–3 ^{PO} | Did not advance | | | | | 16 |
| Jargalsaikhany Chuluunbat | −125 kg | Bye | Akgül (TUR); L 0–4 ^{ST} | Did not advance | | Bye | Saidau (BLR); L 1–3 ^{PP} | Did not advance | 16 |

Women's freestyle

| Athlete | Event | Qualification | Round of 16 | Quarterfinal | Semifinal | Repechage 1 | Repechage 2 | Final / BM | |
| Athlete | Event | Opposition Result | Opposition Result | Opposition Result | Opposition Result | Opposition Result | Opposition Result | Opposition Result | Rank |
|---|---|---|---|---|---|---|---|---|---|
| Erdenechimegiin Sumiyaa | −53 kg | Bye | Krawczyk (POL); L 1–3 ^{PP} | Did not advance | | | | | 12 |
| Pürevdorjiin Orkhon | −58 kg | Hristova (BUL); W 3–1 ^{PP} | Koblova (RUS); L 0–4 ^{ST} | Did not advance | | Niemesch (GER); W 5–0 ^{VT} | Malik (IND); L 1–3 ^{PP} | Did not advance | 7 |
| Soronzonboldyn Battsetseg | −63 kg | Bye | Oborududu (NGR); W 3–1 ^{PP} | Pirozhkova (USA); L 1–3 ^{PP} | Did not advance | | | | 12 |
| Ochirbatyn Nasanburmaa | −69 kg | Bye | Chen W-l (TPE); W 5–0 ^{VT} | Vorobieva (RUS); L 0–5 ^{VT} | Did not advance | Bye | Syzdykova (KAZ); L 1–3 ^{PP} | Did not advance | 8 |

== See also ==
- Mongolia at the 2016 Summer Paralympics
