= Patrick Mailata =

New Zealand boxer (born 1994)

Personal information
- Nicknames: Paddy, Liki, Magic
- Nationality: New Zealander
- Born: Patrick Pakuliki Mailata; 31 December 1994 (age 31) Apia, Samoa
- Height: 1.98 m (6 ft 6 in)
- Weight: Heavyweight

Boxing career
- Reach: 195 cm (77 in)
- Stance: Orthodox

Boxing record
- Total fights: 9
- Wins: 6
- Win by KO: 3
- Losses: 3
Medal record
Men's amateur boxing
Representing New Zealand
Oceanian Youth Championships
Gold medal – first place	2012 Papeete	Super-heavyweight
China Open
Bronze medal – third place	2013 Guiyang	Super-heavyweight
Gee Bee Tournament
Bronze medal – third place	2014 Helsinki	Super-heavyweight
Belgrade Winner Tournament
Gold medal – first place	2014 Belgrade	Super-heavyweight
Oceanian Championships
Silver medal – second place	2015 Canberra	Super-heavyweight
Silver medal – second place	2017 Gold Coast	Super-heavyweight
Pacific Games
Bronze medal – third place	2023 Honiara	Super heavyweight
Commonwealth Games
Bronze medal – third place	2018 Gold Coast	Super heavyweight

Patrick Pakuliki Mailata (/mʌɪˈlɑːˈtɑː/; born 31 December 1994) is a Samoan born, New Zealand raised professional boxer. As an amateur, he won three New Zealand national elite championships from 2012 to 2014 and a bronze medal at the 2018 Commonwealth Games.

== Early life ==
Patrick Pakuliki Mailata was born on 31 December 1994 in Apia, a son of Fuatino Letu'u and Tauleave Lekuala Auapa'au Mailata. Growing up, Mailata was raised in the Samoan villages of Avao and A'ufaga before migrating to New Zealand along with his parents when he was only eight years old. He lived in the South Auckland area, and was educated at Papakura High School, where he was head boy. Mailata excelled in rugby league, but suffered a knee injury that forced him to stop competing. He then discovered boxing and passed up offers from National Rugby League clubs to focus on the sport.

== Amateur career ==
Mailata participated at the Papatoetoe Boxing Club of Grant Arkell, and fought fellow countryman Joseph Parker twice at the start of his amateur career. At an early age he became a three-time New Zealand amateur heavyweight champion in 2012, 2013, and 2014, as well as winning several amateur tournaments. Mailata competed throughout Auckland and fought at the AIBA Youth World Boxing Championships at Armenia in 2012 but was disqualified for putting his head lower than his Cuban opponent's belt.

At 18-years-of-age Mailata competed in Guiyang at the China Open boxing event. He was awarded a bronze medal after losing to local Chinese fighter Yusufu Akepaer in the semi-final. After winning national tournaments, Mailata received financial backing from a promotional company, Duco Events. It saw him contest in international competitions such as the Gee Bee Tournament in Finland and the 52nd Winner Tournament in Serbia where he respectively won a bronze and gold medal. He also became a participant at the 2014 Glasgow Commonwealth Games. The following year, Mailata suffered a loss to Australian Joe Goodall in the Oceanian Championships super-heavyweight gold medal final. His second placed finish saw him as one of four New Zealanders that qualified for the AIBA World Boxing Championships in Qatar. He lost his first round matchup against Rafael Lima of Brazil.

In 2016 Mailata missed out on qualifying for the 2016 Rio Summer Olympics after losing to Kazakhstan's Ivan Dychko at the Asia and Oceania Qualification Tournament. He then fell short in a repeat loss to Joe Goodwall at the 2017 Oceanian Championships, winning a second silver medal. Mailata had his first chance to compete at a semi-professional level after being drafted by the World Series of Boxing franchise, British Lionhearts. In the first leg, he narrowly lost to France Fighting Roosters competitor, Jonathan Nacto at the Salle Wagram. Mailata ended his second leg match with a third round stoppage over Nursultan Amanzhilov of the Astana Arlans. He had his second successive win after an abandoned decision in round four against Marijan Brnic.

=== Team Combat League ===
On May 23, 2024, for the Team Combat League boxing organization, Mailata knocked out former National Football League player and former UFC heavyweight Greg Hardy. Mailata is currently on the Las Vegas Hustle team and has not lost a round with the team as of May 2024.

== Professional career ==
=== Early career ===
In late October 2018 it was revealed Mailata would turn professional after being announced as a feature on Shane Cameron's Counterpunch Fight Night in November at ABA Stadium. Mailata was scheduled to fight fellow New Zealander Thomas Russell but was later replaced by Jayson Aloese. He recorded a dominant first-round technical knockout. After signing a promotional agreement with Epic Sports and Entertainment in June 2019, it was announced he would make his United States debut in Las Vegas. Mailata remained unbeaten after winning a second consecutive first-round knockout victory over Daniel Felix Franco in his first fight overseas. The following month Mailata fought on the opening undercard bout of Cody Crowley versus Mian Hussain on UFC Fight Pass in Peterborough, Canada. He then fought during December in Bulgaria against Ukrainian Pavlo Krolenko.

== Professional boxing record ==
9 fights	6 wins	3 losses
By knockout	3	0
By decision	3	3

No.	Result	Record	Opponent	Type	Round, time	Date	Location	Notes
9	Loss	6–3	Gurgen Hovhannisyan	MD	8	13 Dec 2024	Caribe Royale Orlando, Orlando, Florida, U.S.	
8	Loss	6–2	Antonio Mireles	SD	6	25 Mar 2023	Save Mart Center, Fresno, California, U.S.	
7	Win	6–1	Francois Russell	TKO	1 (4), 3:00	26 Mar 2022	Maumelle Event Center, North Little Rock, Arkansas, US	
6	Win	5–1	Terrell Jamal Woods	MD	4	18 Feb 2022	801 Convention and Event Center, Salt Lake City, Utah, US	
5	Loss	4–1	Kingsley Ibeh	MD	6	2 Jul 2020	MGM Grand, Paradise, Nevada, US	
4	Win	4–0	Pavlo Krolenko	UD	6	14 Dec 2019	Kolodruma, Plovdiv, Bulgaria	
3	Win	3–0	Jorge Sevilla Acosta	UD	4	19 Oct 2019	Memorial Centre, Peterborough, Ontario, Canada	
2	Win	2–0	Daniel Felix Franco	KO	1 (4), 0:64	5 Sep 2019	Rio All-Suite Hotel and Casino, Las Vegas, Nevada, US	
1	Win	1–0	Jayson Aloese	TKO	1 (4), 2:15	2 Nov 2018	ABA Stadium, Auckland, New Zealand	
