= Philippines at the 2016 Summer Olympics =

- Flag of the Philippines
- IOC code: PHI
- NOC: Philippine Olympic Committee
- Website: www.olympic.ph

in Rio de Janeiro
- Competitors: 13 in 8 sports
- Flag bearer (opening): Ian Lariba (Note: Ian Lariba was the official flag-bearer for the Philippine delegation at the Olympics. In the opening ceremony however once the delegation passed the VIP box and was announced the flag was passed to Kirstie Alora)
- Flag bearer (closing): Kirstie Alora
- Medals Ranked 69th: Gold 0 Silver 1 Bronze 0 Total 1

Summer Olympics appearances (overview)
- 1924; 1928; 1932; 1936; 1948; 1952; 1956; 1960; 1964; 1968; 1972; 1976; 1980; 1984; 1988; 1992; 1996; 2000; 2004; 2008; 2012; 2016; 2020; 2024

The Philippines competed at the 2016 Summer Olympics in Rio de Janeiro, Brazil, from 5 to 21 August 2016. Since the nation's official debut in 1924, Filipino athletes had appeared in every edition of the Summer Olympic Games, but did not attend the 1980 Summer Olympics in Moscow because of the nation's partial support for the US-led boycott.

The Philippine Olympic Committee fielded a team of 13 athletes, seven men and six women, to compete in eight different sports at the Games. Although its full roster was roughly larger by two athletes than in 2012, this was still one of the Philippines' smallest delegations sent to the Olympics. Among the sports represented by the nation's athletes, the Philippines marked its Olympic debut in golf (new to the 2016 Games) and table tennis, as well as its return to taekwondo after an eight-year absence.

The Philippine delegation featured four returning Olympians, with only two of them headed to their third straight Games: 35-year-old long jumper Marestella Torres (the oldest competitor of the team), and world-ranked weightlifter Hidilyn Diaz. The remaining returnees on the Philippine roster were swimmers Jessie Lacuna and Jasmine Alkhaldi, who both competed at their maiden Games in London four years earlier. Meanwhile, nine Filipino athletes made their Olympic debut in Rio de Janeiro, including table tennis player Ian Lariba, who was appointed by the committee as the flag bearer for the country's delegation in the opening ceremony.

The Philippines left Rio de Janeiro with a historic silver-medal feat from Diaz in the women's 53 kg category, ending the nation's twenty-year-old drought on the podium.

== Background ==
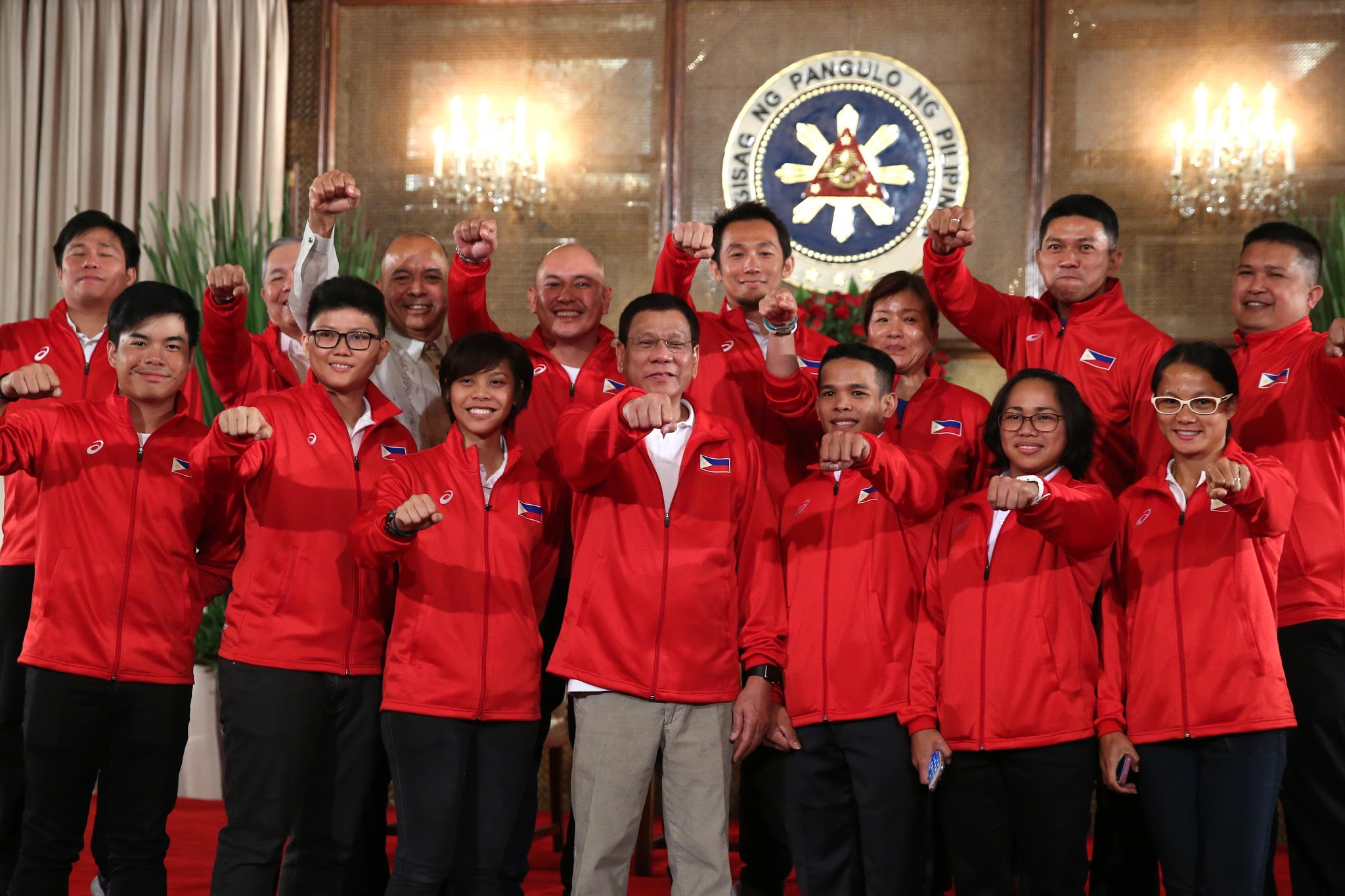
The Philippine Olympic delegation posing with President Rodrigo Duterte at the Malacañang Palace.

POC 1st Vice President and Larong Volleyball sa Pilipinas, Inc. president Joey Romasanta, was named as the Philippine delegation's chef de mission for the Olympics.

Philippine President Rodrigo Duterte, PSC Chairman Butch Ramirez, POC President Peping Cojuangco, Romasanta, and other sports officials, led a send-off ceremony for the athletes that will compete in the Rio Olympics. The ceremony was held at the Malacañang Palace on 18 July 2016. Six athletes from weightlifting, taekwondo, table tennis, golf, swimming and athletics attended, while the rest were absent from the send-off because they were outside the country preparing for the Games. President Duterte said that the cash allowances of athletes would be increased from $1,000 to $3,000 while those of sports officials, coaches and trainers would rise from $3,000 to $5,000. He will also give financial support to the Philippine athletes by giving money from unpaid tax collections from the oligarchy and tax evaders. Table tennis player Ian Lariba, was named as the Philippine delegation's flagbearer for the Rio Olympic opening ceremony.

The 16-man Philippine delegation, which composed of six athletes, coaches and officials led by Romasanta and POC 2nd Vice President Jeff Tamayo flew to Rio de Janeiro on 23 July 2016. The Philippine flag was hoisted in the Athletes Village on 3 August 2016, signifying the entry of the Philippine contingent in the 2016 Summer Olympics.

The Philippine Olympic Committee has partnered with Asics (Sonak Trading) as the official apparel outfitter of the Philippine delegation in the Olympics.

=== Opening ceremony ===
The Philippines was the seventy-fifth country (based in the Portuguese language) to walk in the parade of nations rites during the opening ceremonies of the 2016 Summer Olympics on 5 August 2016.

Table tennis player Ian Lariba, was named as the Philippine delegation's flagbearer for the Rio Olympic opening ceremony. Taekwondo jin Kirstie Alora took over carrying the flag from Lariba, when the delegation passed the VIP grandstand.

== Medalists ==
Medal	Name	Sport	Event	Date
Silver	Hidilyn Diaz	Weightlifting	Women's 53 kg	7 August

== Competitors ==
=== Athletics (track and field) ===
Filipino athletes have so far achieved qualifying standards in the following athletics events (up to a maximum of 3 athletes in each event):

Key

- Note–Ranks given for track events are within the athlete's heat only
- Q = Qualified for the next round
- q = Qualified for the next round as a fastest loser or, in field events, by position without achieving the qualifying target
- NR = National record
- N/A = Round not applicable for the event
- X = Athlete not required to compete in round

Track & road events

Athlete	Event	Heat		Semifinal		Final	
Athlete	Event	Result	Rank	Result	Rank	Result	Rank
Eric Shauwn Cray	Men's 400 m hurdles	49.05	3 Q	49.37	7	Did not advance	
Mary Joy Tabal	Women's marathon	—N/a				3:02:27	124

Field events

Athlete	Event	Qualification		Final	
Athlete	Event	Distance	Position	Distance	Position
Marestella Torres	Women's long jump	6.22	28	Did not advance	

=== Boxing ===
The Philippines entered two boxers to compete in each of the following weight classes into the Olympic boxing tournament. Rogen Ladon and Asian Games runner-up Charly Suarez had claimed their Olympic spots at the 2016 Asia & Oceania Qualification Tournament in Qian'an, China. Suarez failed to advance to the next round of the men's lightweight division, after losing to his opponent Joseph Cordina of Great Britain in the opening match through a split decision, with judges scored 2–1, in favor of the latter boxer. Ladon, on the other hand, lost to Yuberjen Martinez of Colombia, via unanimous decision, with all judges scored 2–1, in favor of Martinez. During the fight, Ladon suffered a hamstring injury because of the punches threw out by his opponent.

Athlete	Event	Round of 32	Round of 16	Quarterfinals	Semifinals	Final	
Athlete	Event	Opposition Result	Opposition Result	Opposition Result	Opposition Result	Opposition Result	Rank
Rogen Ladon	Men's light flyweight	Bye	Martínez (COL); L 0–3	Did not advance			
Charly Suarez	Men's lightweight	Cordina (GBR); L 1–2	Did not advance				

=== Golf ===
The Philippines entered a single golfer into the Olympic tournament. Miguel Tabuena (world no. 140) qualified directly among the top 60 eligible players for the men's event based on the IGF World Rankings as of 11 July 2016. Angelo Que and Dottie Ardina also qualified for the Olympics but chose not to participate, citing the Zika virus concerns.

Athlete	Event	Round 1	Round 2	Round 3	Round 4	Total		
Athlete	Event	Score	Score	Score	Score	Score	Par	Rank
Miguel Tabuena	Men's	73	75	73	70	291	+7	53

=== Judo ===
The Philippines received a spare berth to send a judoka to compete in the men's half-middleweight category (81 kg) to the Olympics, following the last-minute withdrawal of Iran's Alireza Khojasteh from the men's half-lightweight category (66 kg). Nakano, lost to Matteo Marconcini of Italy in their match-up, which lasted for 1 minute and 19 seconds, in the opening round, scoring an ippon in favor of his opponent.

Athlete	Event	Round of 64	Round of 32	Round of 16	Quarterfinals	Semifinals	Repechage	Final / BM	
Athlete	Event	Opposition Result	Opposition Result	Opposition Result	Opposition Result	Opposition Result	Opposition Result	Opposition Result	Rank
Kodo Nakano	Men's −81 kg	Marconcini (ITA); L 000–100	Did not advance						

=== Swimming ===
The Philippines received a Universality invitation from FINA to send two swimmers, one male and one female, to the Olympics.

Jessie Lacuna finished in sixth place out of seven swimmers in the men's 400m freestyle competition Heat 2, with a time of 4:01.70. He ranked 46th out of 50 swimmers who qualified for the event. Jasmine Alkhaldi, meanwhile, timed 56.30 seconds on the clock in the women's 100m freestyle competition, finishing third in Heat 2. However, she did not advance to the semifinals, finishing 33rd out of 46 swimmers who started the race.

Athlete	Event	Heat		Semifinal		Final	
Athlete	Event	Time	Rank	Time	Rank	Time	Rank
Jessie Lacuna	Men's 400 m freestyle	4:01.70	46	—N/a		Did not advance	
Jasmine Alkhaldi	Women's 100 m freestyle	56.30	33	Did not advance			

=== Table tennis ===
The Philippines entered one athlete into the table tennis competition at the Games for the first time in Olympic history. Ian Lariba scored a second-stage draw victory to book one of the six remaining Olympic spots in the women's singles at the Asian Qualification Tournament in Hong Kong. However, Lariba did not qualify in Round 1 of the table tennis competition after she lost to Republic of the Congo's Han Xing in straight sets, 4–0.

Athlete	Event	Preliminary	Round 1	Round 2	Round 3	Round of 16	Quarterfinals	Semifinals	Final / BM	
Athlete	Event	Opposition Result	Opposition Result	Opposition Result	Opposition Result	Opposition Result	Opposition Result	Opposition Result	Opposition Result	Rank
Ian Lariba	Women's singles	Han X (CGO); L 0–4	Did not advance							

=== Taekwondo ===
The Philippines entered one athlete into the taekwondo competition at the Olympics, signifying its sporting comeback after an eight-year hiatus. 2014 Asian Games bronze medalist Kirstie Alora secured a spot in the women's heavyweight category (+67 kg) by virtue of her top two finish at the 2016 Asian Qualification Tournament in Pasay.

Athlete	Event	Round of 16	Quarterfinals	Semifinals	Repechage	Final / BM	
Athlete	Event	Opposition Result	Opposition Result	Opposition Result	Opposition Result	Opposition Result	Rank
Kirstie Alora	Women's +67 kg	Espinoza (MEX); L 1–4	Did not advance		Dislam (MAR); L 5–7	Did not advance	7

=== Weightlifting ===
The Philippines qualified one female weightlifter for the Rio Olympics by virtue of a top six national finish at the 2016 Asian Championships. Meanwhile, a single men's Olympic spot was added to the Philippine weightlifting team by virtue of his top 15 individual finish, among those who had not secured any quota places through the World or Asian Championships, in the IWF World Rankings as of 20 June 2016. The place was awarded to 2015 World Championships fourth-placer Nestor Colonia in the men's bantamweight division (56 kg).

Filipina weightlifter Hidilyn Diaz won the silver medal of the women's 53 kg category, after successfully clinching a lift of 88 kg in her second attempt of the snatch (placed sixth) and 111 kg and 112 kg in the first and second attempts, respectively, in the clean and jerk event (placed second). Diaz' silver-medal finish in Rio de Janeiro also produced a historic feat for the Philippines on multiple levels: the first medal won by a Filipino female, the country's first medal in a regular sport at the Olympics, and the first non-boxing medal since 1936.

Her co-weightlifter Nestor Colonia did not earn any medal in the men's 56 kg category, after he failed three attempts to lift 154 kg in the clean and jerk event, Moreover, he lifted 120 kg in the snatch stage, finishing in seventh position.

Athlete	Event	Snatch		Clean & jerk		Total	Rank
Athlete	Event	Result	Rank	Result	Rank	Total	Rank
Nestor Colonia	Men's −56 kg	120	7	~~154~~	DNF	120	DNF
Hidilyn Diaz	Women's −53 kg	88	T-5	112	2	200	2nd place, silver medalist(s)

== See also ==
- Philippines at the 2016 Summer Paralympics
