= 2015 Asian Amateur Boxing Championships =

Boxing competitions

2015 Asian Boxing Championships
- Host city: Bangkok, Thailand
- Dates: 26 August – 5 September 2015
- Main venue: Thammasat University

The 28th edition of the Men's Asian Amateur Boxing Championships was held from August 26 to September 5, 2015 in Bangkok, Thailand.

== Medal summary ==
Event	Gold	Silver	Bronze
Light flyweight 49 kg	Hasanboy Dusmatov; Uzbekistan	Rogen Ladon; Philippines	Devendro Singh; India
Light flyweight 49 kg	Hasanboy Dusmatov; Uzbekistan	Rogen Ladon; Philippines	Gankhuyagiin Gan-Erdene; Mongolia
Flyweight; 52 kg	Olzhas Sattibayev; Kazakhstan	Shakhobidin Zoirov; Uzbekistan	Azat Usenaliev; Kyrgyzstan
Flyweight; 52 kg	Olzhas Sattibayev; Kazakhstan	Shakhobidin Zoirov; Uzbekistan	Hu Jianguan; China
Bantamweight; 56 kg	Chatchai Butdee; Thailand	Murodjon Akhmadaliev; Uzbekistan	Kairat Yeraliyev; Kazakhstan
Bantamweight; 56 kg	Chatchai Butdee; Thailand	Murodjon Akhmadaliev; Uzbekistan	Shiva Thapa; India
Lightweight; 60 kg	Dorjnyambuugiin Otgondalai; Mongolia	Zakir Safiullin; Kazakhstan	Elnur Abduraimov; Uzbekistan
Lightweight; 60 kg	Dorjnyambuugiin Otgondalai; Mongolia	Zakir Safiullin; Kazakhstan	Daisuke Narimatsu; Japan
Light welterweight 64 kg	Wuttichai Masuk; Thailand	Fazliddin Gaibnazarov; Uzbekistan	Lim Hyun-chul; South Korea
Light welterweight 64 kg	Wuttichai Masuk; Thailand	Fazliddin Gaibnazarov; Uzbekistan	Ahmad Ghossoun; Syria
Welterweight; 69 kg	Daniyar Yeleussinov; Kazakhstan	Eumir Marcial; Philippines	Byambyn Tüvshinbat; Mongolia
Welterweight; 69 kg	Daniyar Yeleussinov; Kazakhstan	Eumir Marcial; Philippines	Yasuhiro Suzuki; Japan
Middleweight; 75 kg	Bektemir Melikuziev; Uzbekistan	Vikas Krishan Yadav; India	Sajjad Mehrabi; Iran
Middleweight; 75 kg	Bektemir Melikuziev; Uzbekistan	Vikas Krishan Yadav; India	Waheed Abdul-Ridha; Iraq
Light heavyweight 81 kg	Adilbek Niyazymbetov; Kazakhstan	Elshod Rasulov; Uzbekistan	Hassan Shahini; Iran
Light heavyweight 81 kg	Adilbek Niyazymbetov; Kazakhstan	Elshod Rasulov; Uzbekistan	None awarded
Heavyweight; 91 kg	Vassiliy Levit; Kazakhstan	Rustam Tulaganov; Uzbekistan	Jahon Qurbonov; Tajikistan
Heavyweight; 91 kg	Vassiliy Levit; Kazakhstan	Rustam Tulaganov; Uzbekistan	Reza Moradkhani; Iran
Super heavyweight +91 kg	Ivan Dychko; Kazakhstan	Wang Zhibao; China	Hussein Ishaish; Jordan
Super heavyweight +91 kg	Ivan Dychko; Kazakhstan	Wang Zhibao; China	Satish Kumar; India

== Medal table ==
Rank	Nation	Gold	Silver	Bronze	Total
1	Kazakhstan	5	1	1	7
2	Uzbekistan	2	5	1	8
3	Thailand	2	0	0	2
4	Mongolia	1	0	2	3
5	Philippines	0	2	0	2
6	India	0	1	3	4
7	China	0	1	1	2
8	Iran	0	0	3	3
9	Japan	0	0	2	2
10	Iraq	0	0	1	1
10	Jordan	0	0	1	1
10	Kyrgyzstan	0	0	1	1
10	South Korea	0	0	1	1
10	Syria	0	0	1	1
10	Tajikistan	0	0	1	1
Totals (15 entries)		10	10	19	39
