= China Open =

China Open may refer to:

- China Open (snooker), a professional snooker tournament
- China Open (tennis), a professional tennis tournament on the ATP World Tour and WTA Tour
- China Open (badminton), an annual badminton tournament
- China Open (squash)
- China Open (table tennis), an ITTF table tennis tournament
- Volvo China Open, a golf tournament on the European Tour
- China Open (boxing)
- China Open (curling), a curling tournament on the World Curling Tour
- China Open (pool)
