= Boxing at the 2018 Commonwealth Games – Men's super heavyweight =

Boxing competitions

Boxing – Men's super heavyweight at the 2018 Commonwealth Games
- Venue: Oxenford Studios
- Dates: 6 – 14 April 2018
- Competitors: 10 from 10 nations

Medalists
gold medal	Frazer Clarke	England
silver medal	Satish Kumar	India
bronze medal	Keddy Agnes	Seychelles
bronze medal	Patrick Mailata	New Zealand

The men's super heavyweight boxing competitions at the 2018 Commonwealth Games in Gold Coast, Australia took place between 6 and 14 April at Oxenford Studios. Super heavyweights are those who are over 91 kilograms in weight.

Like all Commonwealth boxing events, the competition was a straight single-elimination tournament. Both semifinal losers were awarded bronze medals, so no boxers competed again after their first loss. Bouts consisted of three rounds of three minutes each, with one-minute breaks between rounds. Beginning this year, the competition was scored using the "must-ten" scoring system.

== Schedule ==
The schedule is as follows:

All times are Australian Eastern Standard Time (UTC+10)

Date	Time	Round
Friday 6 April 2018	20:17	Round of 16
Tuesday 10 April 2018	20:32	Quarter-finals
Friday 13 April 2018	21:32	Semi-finals
Saturday 14 April 2018	13:47	Final

== Results ==
The draw is as follows:

Round of 16
Samiuela Kei (TGA)	0
Arsène Fokou Fosso (CMR)	5
Patrick Mailata (NZL)	5
Mitchell Barton (SCO)	0

Quarterfinals
Keddy Agnes (SEY)	4
Arsène Fokou Fosso (CMR)	1
Satish Kumar (IND)	4
Nigel Paul (TTO)	1
Toese Vou Siutu (AUS)	0
Frazer Clarke (ENG)	5
Patrick Mailata (NZL)	5
Stephen McMonagle (NIR)	0

Semifinals
Keddy Agnes (SEY)
Satish Kumar (IND)	ABD
Frazer Clarke (ENG)	3
Patrick Mailata (NZL)	2

Final
Satish Kumar (IND)	0
Frazer Clarke (ENG)	5
