= Gankhuyagiin Gan-Erdene =

Mongolian boxer (born 1993)

Personal information
- Nationality: Mongolia
- Born: Ганхуягийн Ган-Эрдэнэ; 29 March 1993 (age 33)
- Height: 162 cm (5 ft 4 in)

Sport
- Country: Mongolia
- Sport: Amateur boxing
- Weight class: Light flyweight 48kg
- Coached by: D. Batsuren
Medal record
Men's amateur boxing
Representing Mongolia
Asian Championships
| Silver medal – second place | 2017 Tashkent | Light flyweight |
| Bronze medal – third place | 2015 Bangkok | Light flyweight |
Summer Universiade
| Bronze medal – third place | 2013 Kazan | Light flyweight |

Gankhuyagiin Gan-Erdene (Mongolian: Ганхуягийн Ган-Эрдэнэ; born 29 March 1993) is a Mongolian boxer who competed at the 2016 Summer Olympics.

At the 2015 Asian Amateur Boxing Championships held in Bangkok, Thailand, he won a bronze medal, losing to Rogen Ladon of the Philippines in the semifinals after wins against Ham Jong Hyok of North Korea in the quarterfinals and Kim Won Ho of South Korea in the first preliminary round.

In April 2016 he defeated 2014 Commonwealth Games silver medallist Devendro Singh Laishram of India in the third place bout at AIBA Asian/Oceanian Olympic Qualification Event, held in Qian'an, China to qualify for the Olympic men's light flyweight.
