= Kyrgyzstan at the 2016 Summer Olympics =

- IOC code: KGZ
- NOC: National Olympic Committee of the Republic of Kyrgyzstan

in Rio de Janeiro
- Competitors: 19 in 6 sports
- Flag bearer: Erkin Adylbek Uulu
- Medals: Gold 0 Silver 0 Bronze 0 Total 0

Summer Olympics appearances (overview)
- 1996; 2000; 2004; 2008; 2012; 2016; 2020; 2024; 2028

Other related appearances
- Russian Empire (1900–1912); Soviet Union (1952–1988); Unified Team (1992)

Kyrgyzstan competed at the 2016 Summer Olympics in Rio de Janeiro, Brazil, from 5 to 21 August 2016. This was the nation's sixth consecutive appearance at the Olympics in the post-Soviet era.

The National Olympic Committee of the Republic of Kyrgyzstan fielded a squad of 19 athletes, 12 men and 7 women, to compete in six different sports at the Games. Although its full roster was larger by five athletes than in London four years earlier, this was still one of Kyrgyzstan's smallest delegations sent to the Olympics. Kyrgyzstan made its Olympic return in boxing after an eight-year absence.

The Kyrgyzstan roster featured seven returning Olympians, with marathon runner Iuliia Andreeva attending her third straight Games as the oldest and most experienced participant (aged 32). Four of the returnees hailed from the wrestling team, including Asian Games bronze medalist Aisuluu Tynybekova, and veteran Janarbek Kenjeev, who qualified for his second Games after he debuted in 2004. Other notable Kyrgyz athletes included 16-year-old Denis Petrashov, who succeeded his father and three-time Olympian Yevgeny Petrashov to compete in swimming, and light heavyweight boxer Erkin Adylbek Uulu, who led his delegation as the flag bearer in the opening ceremony.

For the second Olympics in a row, Kyrgyzstan failed to win a single medal in Rio de Janeiro. On August 18, 2016, the International Olympic Committee stripped weightlifter Izzat Artykov of his bronze medal after testing positive for the stimulant strychnine. Meanwhile, several athletes on the Kyrgyzstan roster narrowly missed out of the podium, including Tynybekova, her wrestling teammate Arsen Eraliev (both placed fifth in their respective weight categories), and judoka Iurii Krakovetskii (seventh, men's +100 kg).

== Athletics ==
Kyrgyz athletes achieved qualifying standards in the following athletics events (up to a maximum of 3 athletes in each event):

Key

- Note–Ranks given for track events are within the athlete's heat only
- Q = Qualified for the next round
- q = Qualified for the next round as a fastest loser or, in field events, by position without achieving the qualifying target
- NR = National record
- N/A = Round not applicable for the event
- Bye = Athlete not required to compete in round

Track & road events

Athlete	Event	Final	
Athlete	Event	Result	Rank
Ilya Tyapkin	Men's marathon	2:23:19	86
Darya Maslova	Women's 10000 m	31:36.90 NR	19
Iuliia Andreeva	Women's marathon	2:40:34	59
Mariya Korobitskaya	Women's marathon	2:47:53	94
Viktoriia Poliudina	Women's marathon	2:41:37	62

== Boxing ==
Kyrgyzstan entered one boxer to compete in the men's light heavyweight division into the Olympic boxing tournament. Erkin Adylbek Uulu claimed his Olympic spot with a box-off victory at the 2016 Asia & Oceania Qualification Tournament in Qian'an, China.

Athlete	Event	Round of 32	Round of 16	Quarterfinals	Semifinals	Final	
Athlete	Event	Opposition Result	Opposition Result	Opposition Result	Opposition Result	Opposition Result	Rank
Erkin Adylbek Uulu	Men's light heavyweight	Carrillo (COL); L 0–3	Did not advance				

== Judo ==
Kyrgyzstan qualified two judokas for each of the following weight classes at the Games. London 2012 Olympian Iurii Krakovetskii was ranked among the top 14 eligible judokas for women in the IJF World Ranking List of May 30, 2016, while Otar Bestaev at men's extra-lightweight (60 kg) earned a continental quota spot from the Asian region, as Kyrgyzstan's top-ranked judoka outside of direct qualifying position.

Athlete	Event	Round of 64	Round of 32	Round of 16	Quarterfinals	Semifinals	Repechage	Final / BM	
Athlete	Event	Opposition Result	Opposition Result	Opposition Result	Opposition Result	Opposition Result	Opposition Result	Opposition Result	Rank
Otar Bestaev	Men's −60 kg	Bye	Abelrahman (EGY); W 101–000	Safarov (AZE); L 001–110	Did not advance				
Iurii Krakovetskii	Men's +100 kg	—N/a	Breitbarth (GER); W 100–000	Khammo (UKR); W 111–000	Tangriev (UZB); L 001–100	Did not advance	García (CUB); L 000–100	Did not advance	7

== Swimming ==
Kyrgyzstan received a Universality invitation from FINA to send two swimmers (one male and one female) to the Olympics.

Athlete	Event	Heat		Semifinal		Final	
Athlete	Event	Time	Rank	Time	Rank	Time	Rank
Denis Petrashov	Men's 200 m breaststroke	2:16.57	38	Did not advance			
Dariya Talanova	Women's 100 m breaststroke	1:10.94	34	Did not advance			

== Weightlifting ==
Kyrgyzstan qualified one male weightlifter for the Rio Olympics by virtue of a top seven national finish at the 2016 Asian Championships. Meanwhile, an unused women's Olympic spot was added to the Kyrgyz weightlifting team by IWF, as a response to the vacancy of women's quota places in the individual World Rankings and to the "multiple positive cases" of doping on several nations. The team must allocate places to individual athletes by June 20, 2016.

Athlete	Event	Snatch		Clean & Jerk		Total	Rank
Athlete	Event	Result	Rank	Result	Rank	Total	Rank
Izzat Artykov	Men's −69 kg	151	5	188	3	339	DSQ
Zhanyl Okoeva	Women's −48 kg	72	11	97	8	169	10

== Wrestling ==
Kyrgyzstan qualified a total of six wrestlers for each of the following weight classes into the Olympic tournament. Two of them finished among the top six to book Olympic spots each in men's freestyle 97 kg and men's Greco-Roman 59 kg at the 2015 World Championships, while four further berths were awarded to Kyrgyz wrestlers, who progressed to the top two finals at the 2016 Asian Qualification Tournament.

One further wrestler claimed the remaining Olympic slot in men's Greco-Roman 66 kg to round out the Kyrgyz roster at the final meet of the World Qualification Tournament in Istanbul.

On May 11, 2016, United World Wrestling decided to replace an Olympic license from Kyrgyzstan in men's Greco-Roman 85 kg with the men's freestyle 125 kg, as a response to the doping violations at the Asian Qualification Tournament, but it was redistributed two months later, following the recent meldonium guidelines released by IOC and WADA.

Key:

- VT – Victory by fall.
- PP – Decision by points – the loser with technical points.
- PO – Decision by points – the loser without technical points.
- ST – Great superiority – the loser without technical points and a margin of victory of at least 8 (Greco-Roman) or 10 (freestyle) points.
- SP – Technical superiority – the loser with technical points and a margin of victory of at least 8 (Greco-Roman) or 10 (freestyle) points.

Men's freestyle

Athlete	Event	Qualification	Round of 16	Quarterfinal	Semifinal	Repechage 1	Repechage 2	Final / BM	
Athlete	Event	Opposition Result	Opposition Result	Opposition Result	Opposition Result	Opposition Result	Opposition Result	Opposition Result	Rank
Magomed Musaev	−97 kg	Bye	Dorjkhand (MGL); W 3–0 ^{PO}	Andriitsev (UKR); L 1–3 ^{PP}	Did not advance				9
Aiaal Lazarev	−125 kg	Bye	Baran (POL); L 1–3 ^{PP}	Did not advance					15

Men's Greco-Roman

Athlete	Event	Qualification	Round of 16	Quarterfinal	Semifinal	Repechage 1	Repechage 2	Final / BM	
Athlete	Event	Opposition Result	Opposition Result	Opposition Result	Opposition Result	Opposition Result	Opposition Result	Opposition Result	Rank
Arsen Eraliev	−59 kg	Bye	Borrero (CUB); L 1–3 ^{PP}	Did not advance		Bye	Wang Lm (CHN); W 3–1 ^{PP}	Tasmuradov (UZB); L 1–3 ^{PP}	5
Ruslan Tsarev	−66 kg	Bye	Benaissa (ALG); L 0–3 ^{PO}	Did not advance					17
Janarbek Kenjeev	−85 kg	Kudla (GER); L 0–3 ^{PO}	Did not advance						15
Murat Ramonov	−130 kg	Semenov (RUS); L 1–3 ^{PP}	Did not advance						11

Women's freestyle

Athlete	Event	Qualification	Round of 16	Quarterfinal	Semifinal	Repechage 1	Repechage 2	Final / BM	
Athlete	Event	Opposition Result	Opposition Result	Opposition Result	Opposition Result	Opposition Result	Opposition Result	Opposition Result	Rank
Aisuluu Tynybekova	−58 kg	Bye	Silva (BRA); W 3–1 ^{PP}	Olli (FIN); W 3–1 ^{PP}	Koblova (RUS); L 1–3 ^{PP}	Bye		Malik (IND); L 1–3 ^{PP}	5
