= Taekwondo at the 2010 Asian Games – Women's 73 kg =

Taekwondo competition

Women's 73 kg at the 2010 Asian Games
- Venue: Guangdong Gymnasium
- Date: 20 November 2010
- Competitors: 7 from 7 nations

Medalists
gold medal	Luo Wei	China
silver medal	Feruza Yergeshova	Kazakhstan
bronze medal	Rapatkorn Prasopsuk	Thailand
bronze medal	Kirstie Alora	Philippines

The women's middleweight (−73 kilograms) event at the 2010 Asian Games took place on 20 November 2010 at Guangdong Gymnasium, Guangzhou, China.

== Schedule ==
All times are China Standard Time (UTC+08:00)

Date	Time	Event
Saturday, 20 November 2010	14:00	Quarterfinals
Saturday, 20 November 2010	14:00	Semifinals
Saturday, 20 November 2010	16:30	Final

== Results ==
Quarterfinals		Semifinals		Final
		Luo Wei (CHN)	2
Sorn Davin (CAM)	1	Rapatkorn Prasopsuk (THA)	1
Rapatkorn Prasopsuk (THA)	1			Luo Wei (CHN)	5
Feruza Yergeshova (KAZ)	6			Feruza Yergeshova (KAZ)	4
Soheila Sayyahi (IRI)	3	Feruza Yergeshova (KAZ)	7
Kirstie Alora (PHI)	4	Kirstie Alora (PHI)	3
Hà Thị Nguyên (VIE)	2
