= Daisuke Narimatsu =

Japanese boxer (born 1989)

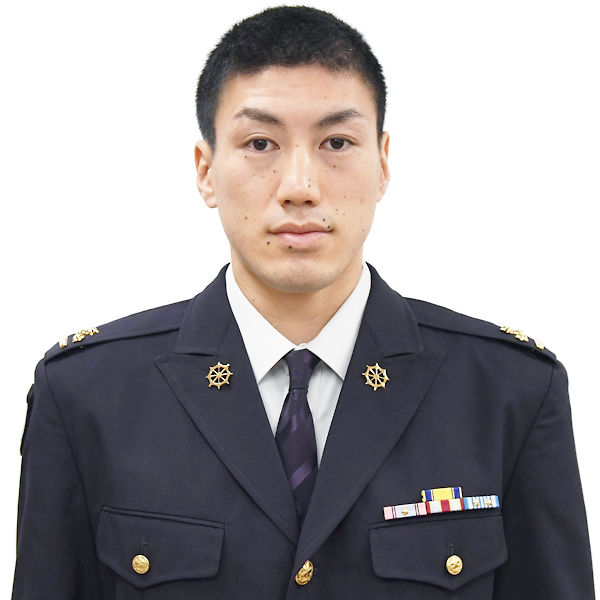
- Daisuke Narimatsu

Personal information
- Born: 14 December 1989 (age 36) Kumamoto, Japan

Boxing career
Medal record
Men's amateur boxing
Representing Japan
Asian Games
Bronze medal – third place	2018 Jakarta	Light welterweight
Asian Championships
Bronze medal – third place	2015 Bangkok	Lightweight

Daisuke Narimatsu (成松 大介, Narimatsu Daisuke; born 14 December 1989) is a Japanese boxer. He competed in the men's lightweight event at the 2016 Summer Olympics, making it to the round of 16.
