= Hu Qianxun =

Chinese boxer (born 1987)

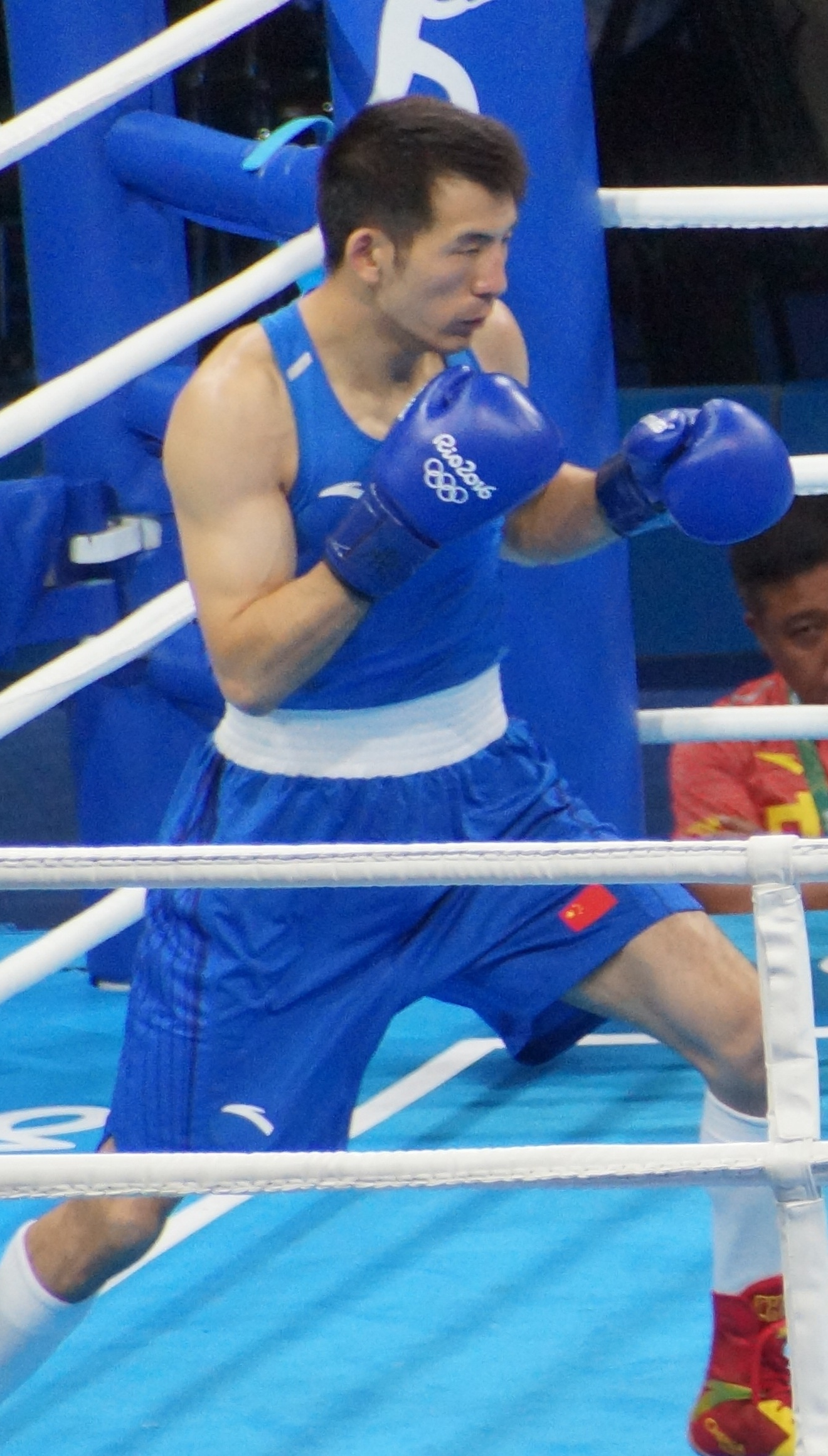
- Hu at the 2016 Olympics

Personal information
- Born: 18 September 1987 (age 37); Yueqing, Wenzhou, Zhejiang, China
- Height: 178 cm (5 ft 10 in)

Sport
- Sport: Amateur boxing
- Coached by: Yang Xiaochao

Hu Qianxun (Chinese: 胡谦逊; pinyin: Hú Qiānxùn, born 18 September 1987) is a Chinese amateur boxer. He competed in the light welterweight division at the 2016 Summer Olympics, but was eliminated in the second bout.
