= Zhao Minggang =

Chinese boxer

Personal information
- Born: 30 May 1988 (age 38) Xingtai, Hebei, China

Boxing career

Zhao Minggang (born 30 May 1988) is a Chinese boxer. He competed in the men's middleweight event at the 2016 Summer Olympics.
