= Kirstie Alora =

Filipina taekwondo practitioner

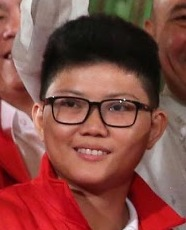

Personal information
- Full name: Kirstie Elaine Alora
- Born: November 25, 1989 (age 36) Biñan, Laguna, Philippines
- Height: 173 cm (5 ft 8 in)

Sport
- Country: Philippines
- Sport: Taekwondo
- Event: Middleweight (-73 kg)
Medal record
Women's taekwondo
Representing Philippines
Event	1st	2nd	3rd
Asian Olympic Qualification Tournament	0	1	0
Asian Taekwondo Championships	0	0	2
Asian Games	0	0	2
Asian Indoor and Martial Arts Games	0	0	1
Southeast Asian Games	4	5	0
Total	4	6	5
Asian Olympic Qualification Tournament
Silver medal – second place	2016 Pasay	67 kg
Asian Taekwondo Championships
Bronze medal – third place	2012 Ho Chi Minh City	73 kg
Bronze medal – third place	2016 Pasay	73 kg
Asian Games
Bronze medal – third place	2010 Guangzhou	73 kg
Bronze medal – third place	2014 Incheon	73 kg
Asian Indoor and Martial Arts Games
Bronze medal – third place	2017 Ashgabat	73 kg
Southeast Asian Games
Gold medal – first place	2005 Manila	59 kg
Gold medal – first place	2011 Indonesia	73 kg
Gold medal – first place	2013 Naypyidaw	73 kg
Gold medal – first place	2023 Cambodia	73 kg
Silver medal – second place	2007 Nakhon Ratchasima	59 kg
Silver medal – second place	2009 Vientiane	73 kg
Silver medal – second place	2017 Kuala Lumpur	73 kg
Silver medal – second place	2019 Philippines	73 kg
Silver medal – second place	2021 Vietnam	73 kg

Kirstie Elaine Alora (born November 25, 1989) is a Filipina taekwondo practitioner. She represented the Philippines at the 2016 Summer Olympics after winning the silver medal at the Asian Olympic Qualifying Tournament.

At the 2016 Summer Olympics, she was defeated by Maria Espinoza of Mexico in the round of 16. She was then defeated by Wiam Dislam of Morocco in the repechage. Alora was the flag bearer for the Philippines during the closing ceremony.

Alora retired from the national team after her campaign in the 2022 Asian Games.
