= China Open (boxing) =

Boxing competitions

The China Open is an annual men's and women's amateur boxing tournament held in Guiyang, China since 2010. It is supported by the International Boxing Association and the Guizhou municipal government.

The tournament began in the city of Guiyang which is a traditional boxing event in the Asian continent. Guiyang is the capital city of Guizhou Province. Is represents all of the thirteen Olympic weight classes, the women boxers can box in the Flyweight class, Lightweight class and Middleweight class in Guiyang. The men competition is scheduled from the 49 kg up to the +91 kg weight classes.
