= Rogen Ladon =

Filipino boxer (born 1993)

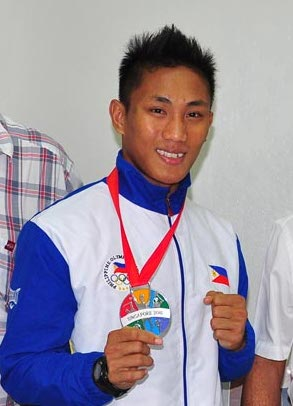
- Ladon in 2015

Personal information
- Nationality: Filipino
- Born: November 10, 1993 (age 32) Bago, Negros Occidental, Philippines
- Height: 5 ft 5 in (165 cm)
- Weight: 108 lb (49 kg)

Boxing career
- Weight class: Flyweight
- Coached by: Pat Gaspi; Nolito Velasco
- Retired: 2024
Medal record
Representing Philippines
Event	1st	2nd	3rd
AIBA World Boxing Championships	0	0	1
Asia & Oceania Boxing Olympic Qualification Tournament	0	1	0
Asian Games	0	1	0
Asian Championships	0	1	1
Southeast Asian Games	2	2	0
Total	2	5	2
AIBA World Boxing Championships
Bronze medal – third place	2015 Qatar	Light flyweight
2016 Asia & Oceania Boxing Olympic Qualification Tournament
Silver medal – second place	2015 Qian'an	Light flyweight
Asian Games
Silver medal – second place	2018 Jakarta–Palembang	Light flyweight
Asian Championships
Silver medal – second place	2015 Bangkok	Light flyweight
Bronze medal – third place	2017 Tashkent	Light flyweight
Southeast Asian Games
Gold medal – first place	2021 Vietnam	Flyweight
Gold medal – first place	2019 Philippines	Flyweight
Silver medal – second place	2023 Cambodia	Flyweight
Silver medal – second place	2015 Singapore	Light flyweight

Rogen Siaga Ladon (born November 10, 1993) is a Filipino retired amateur boxer. He first took up boxing in 2007, and won medals in international tournaments such as the Asian Amateur Boxing Championships and Southeast Asian Games as well as in smaller tournaments such as the 2012 Taipei City Cup and 2011 Hong Kong International Tournament.

Locally, Ladon has won at the Filipino National Open Junior Championships at the 46 kg category winning a bronze at the 2008 edition and a gold at the 2009 edition. He won a gold medal at the 2013 Philippine National Games in the 49 kg category. Ladon was the sparring partner of Mark Anthony Barriga for the 2012 Olympics. He replaced an injured Barriga at the 2013 Asian Championships. His brother Joegin Ladon is also an international boxer.

Ladon qualified for the 2016 Summer Olympics after finishing second at the Asia & Oceania Olympic qualifiers. He also previously attempted to qualify by winning at least a silver at the 2015 AIBA World Boxing Championships but only managed to gain a bronze medal.

Ladon announced his retirement on August 20, 2024, and is looking to transition to coaching.
