= Dorjnyambuugiin Otgondalai =

Mongolian boxer (born 1988)

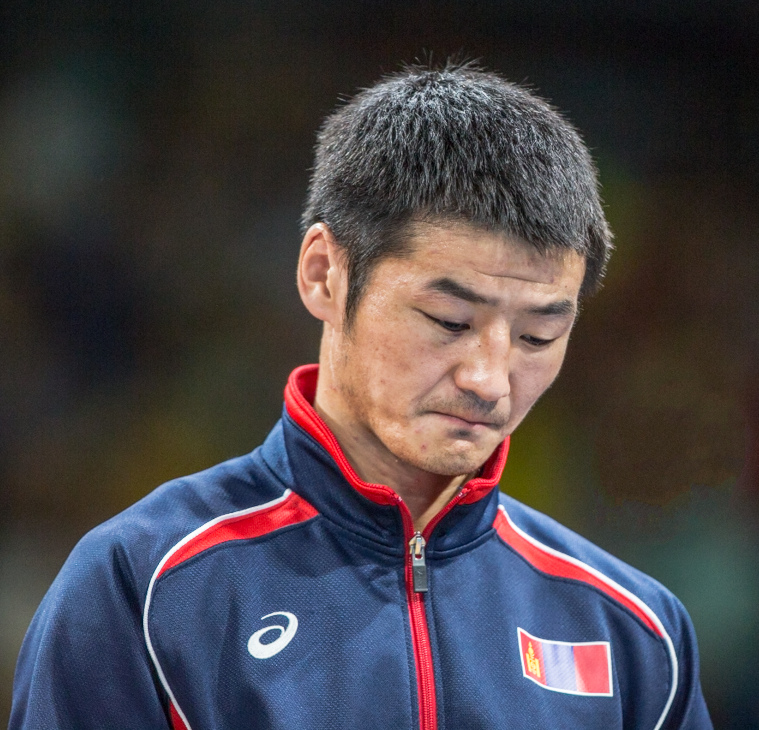
- Dorjnyambuugiin Otgondalai at the 2016 Olympics

Personal information
- Nationality: Mongolia
- Born: 28 January 1988 (age 38)
- Height: 170 cm (5 ft 7 in)

Boxing career
- Weight class: Lightweight(60 kg)
Medal record
Men's amateur boxing
Representing Mongolia
Olympic Games
Bronze medal – third place	2016 Rio de Janeiro	Lightweight
World Championships
Bronze medal – third place	2017 Hamburg	Lightweight
Asian Games
Gold medal – first place	2014 Incheon	Lightweight
Asian Championships
Gold medal – first place	2015 Bangkok	Lightweight
Silver medal – second place	2011 Incheon	Bantamweight
Bronze medal – third place	2017 Tashkent	Lightweight
Summer Universiade
Bronze medal – third place	2013 Kazan	Lightweight
World University Championships
Bronze medal – third place	2010 Ulaanbaatar	Lightweight

Dorjnyambuugiin Otgondalai (born 28 January 1988) is a Mongolian lightweight boxer. He won a gold medal at the 2014 Asian Games and a bronze medal at the 2016 Summer Olympics. He was the flag bearer for Mongolia during the closing ceremony of the 2016 Summer Olympics.
