= Erkin Adylbek Uulu =

Kyrgyzstani boxer (born 1991)

Medal record

Men's amateur boxing

Representing Kyrgyzstan

Asian Championships
Bronze medal – third place	2019 Bangkok	Light heavyweight
Bronze medal – third place	2021 Dubai	Light heavyweight
Bronze medal – third place	2022 Amman	Cruiserweight

Erkin Adylbek Uulu (born 14 February 1991) is a Kyrgyzstani boxer. He is 1.9m tall (6'3ft). He competed at the 2016 Summer Olympics in the men's light heavyweight event, in which he was eliminated in the round of 32 by Juan Carlos Carrillo. He was the flag bearer for Kyrgyzstan at the Parade of Nations.
