= Sajjad Mehrabi =

Iranian boxer

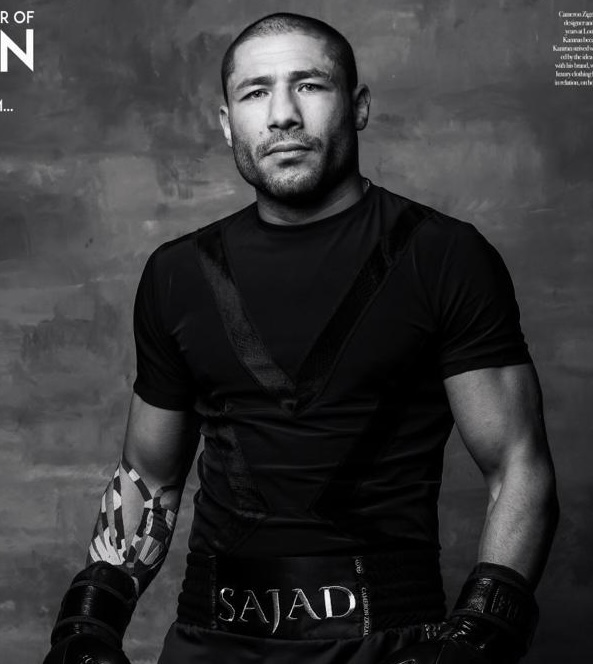

Personal information
- Nickname: Sajjad
- Nationality: Iranian
- Born: Sajjad Mohammad Mehrabi; 21 March 1986 Borujerd, Iran
- Height: 176 cm (5 ft 9 in)
- Weight: super middleweight

Boxing career
- Stance: orthodox

Boxing record
- Total fights: 7
- Wins: 4
- Win by KO: 3
- Losses: 2
- Draws: 1

Sajjad Mehrabi (born 21 March 1986) is an Iranian professional boxer. He started his career in 2014 and currently competes in the Super Middleweight division.

== Professional career ==
Mehrabi began his boxing career in 2014 when he competed in different countries across Asia, Africa and Europe and most notably fought Francis Cheka to a draw in his very first fight. His second fight was contested two years later on 14 May 2016, where he fought Tanzanian Thomas Mashali and lost the bout by a split decision. Mehrabi faced undefeated Russian Nikita Zon on 10 February 2024, and lost the fight by RTD in the 5th round.
