= Byambyn Tüvshinbat =

Mongolian boxer

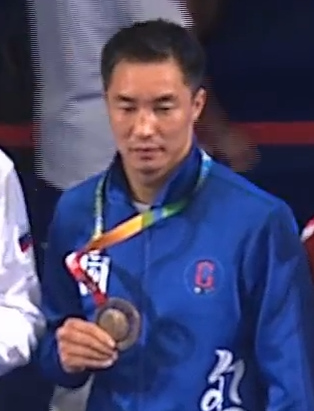
- Tüvshinbat at the 2013 Summer Universiade

Personal information
- Nationality: Mongolia
- Born: 27 March 1987 (age 39) Ulaanbaatar, Mongolia
- Height: 174 cm (5 ft 9 in)

Sport
- Country: Mongolia
- Sport: Amateur boxing
- Weight class: Welterweight(69kg)
- Coached by: D. Batsuren
Medal record
Men's amateur boxing
Representing Mongolia
Asian Championships
Silver medal – second place	2007 Ulaanbaatar	Light welterweight
Bronze medal – third place	2011 Incheon	Welterweight
Bronze medal – third place	2015 Bangkok	Welterweight
Bronze medal – third place	2017 Tashkent	Welterweight
Summer Universiade
Bronze medal – third place	2013 Kazan	Welterweight
World University Championships
Gold medal – first place	2010 Ulaanbaatar	Light welterweight
Bronze medal – third place	2006 Almaty	Light welterweight

Byambyn Tüvshinbat (Mongolian: Бямбын Түвшинбат; born 27 March 1987) is a Mongolian boxer. He competed in the 2007 and 2011 Asian Amateur Boxing Championships (winning silver in 2007 and bronze in 2011), the 2006 and 2010 Asian Games, the 2006 World University Boxing Championship and the Shaheed Benazir Bhutto International Boxing Tournament (where he won the Men's Light Welterweight tournament, defeating Mashhurbek Ruziyev of Uzbekistan). Tüvshinbat represented Mongolia in the Men's welterweight event at the 2012 Summer Olympics and defeated Gabonese Yannick Mitoumba in the first round but lost to Frenchman Alexis Vastine in the second round then in the 2016 Summer Olympics, beating Alberto Palmetta of Argentina in the first round and losing by split decision to Steven Donnelly in his second match.
