= List of flag bearers for Timor-Leste at the Olympics =

Timor-Leste at the Olympics
- Flag of Timor-Leste
- IOC code: TLS
- NOC: National Olympic Committee of Timor-Leste
- Medals: Gold 0 Silver 0 Bronze 0 Total 0

Summer appearances
- 2004; 2008; 2012; 2016; 2020; 2024

Winter appearances
- 2014; 2018; 2022; 2026

Other related appearances
- Indonesia (1952–1996); Individual Olympic Athletes (2000)

This is a list of flag bearers who have represented Timor-Leste (formerly East Timor) at the Olympics.

Flag bearers carry the national flag of their country at the opening ceremony of the Olympic Games.

#	Event year	Season	Flag bearer	Sport
1	2004	Summer	Aguida Amaral	Athletics
2	2008	Summer	Mariana Diaz Ximenez	Athletics
3	2012	Summer	Augusto Ramos Soares	Athletics
4	2014	Winter	Yohan Goutt Gonçalves	Alpine skiing
5	2016	Summer	Francelina Cabral	Cycling
6	2018	Winter	Yohan Goutt Gonçalves	Alpine skiing
7	2020	Summer	Felisberto de Deus	Athletics
7	2020	Summer	Imelda Ximenes	Swimming
8	2022	Winter	Yohan Goutt Gonçalves	Alpine skiing
9	2024	Summer	Ana da Costa da Silva Pinto Belo	Taekwondo
9	2024	Summer	Jolanio Guterres	Swimming

== See also ==
- Timor-Leste at the Olympics
