= Timor-Leste at the 2022 Winter Olympics =

- IOC code: TLS
- NOC: National Olympic Committee of Timor Leste

in Beijing, China 9–25 February 2022
- Competitors: 1 in 1 sport
- Flag bearer (opening): Yohan Goutt Gonçalves
- Flag bearer (closing): Yohan Goutt Gonçalves
- Medals: Gold 0 Silver 0 Bronze 0 Total 0

Winter Olympics appearances (overview)
- 2014; 2018; 2022; 2026

Timor-Leste competed at the 2022 Winter Olympics held in Beijing, China, from 4 to 20 February 2022. It was the country's third appearance at the Winter Olympics after its debut in the previous Games in 2014.

Timor-Leste was represented by one athlete, the male alpine skier Yohan Goutt Gonçalves. He was the nation's flag bearer during both the opening and closing ceremonies. Timor-Leste did not win any medals at the Games and has never won a Winter Olympics medal.

== Background ==
The National Olympic Committee of Timor Leste (Portuguese: Comitê Olímpico Nacional de Timor-Leste) was formed and recognized by the International Olympic Committee in 2003. While Timor-Leste made its Olympic debut at the 2004 Summer Olympics, it did not compete in the Winter Olympics until the 2014 edition at Sochi.

The 2022 Winter Olympics was held in Beijing, China, from 4 to 20 February 2022. This edition of the Games marked Timor-Leste's third appearance at the Winter Olympics. Yohan Goutt Gonçalves was Timor-Leste's sole representative at the Games and served as the country's flag bearer during both the opening and closing ceremonies. The country did not win a medal at the Games, and has never won a Winter Olympics medal.

== Competitors ==
The Timor-Leste contingent consisted of one athlete competing in a single sport.

Sport	Men	Women	Total
Alpine skiing	1	0	1
Total	1	0	1

== Alpine skiing ==
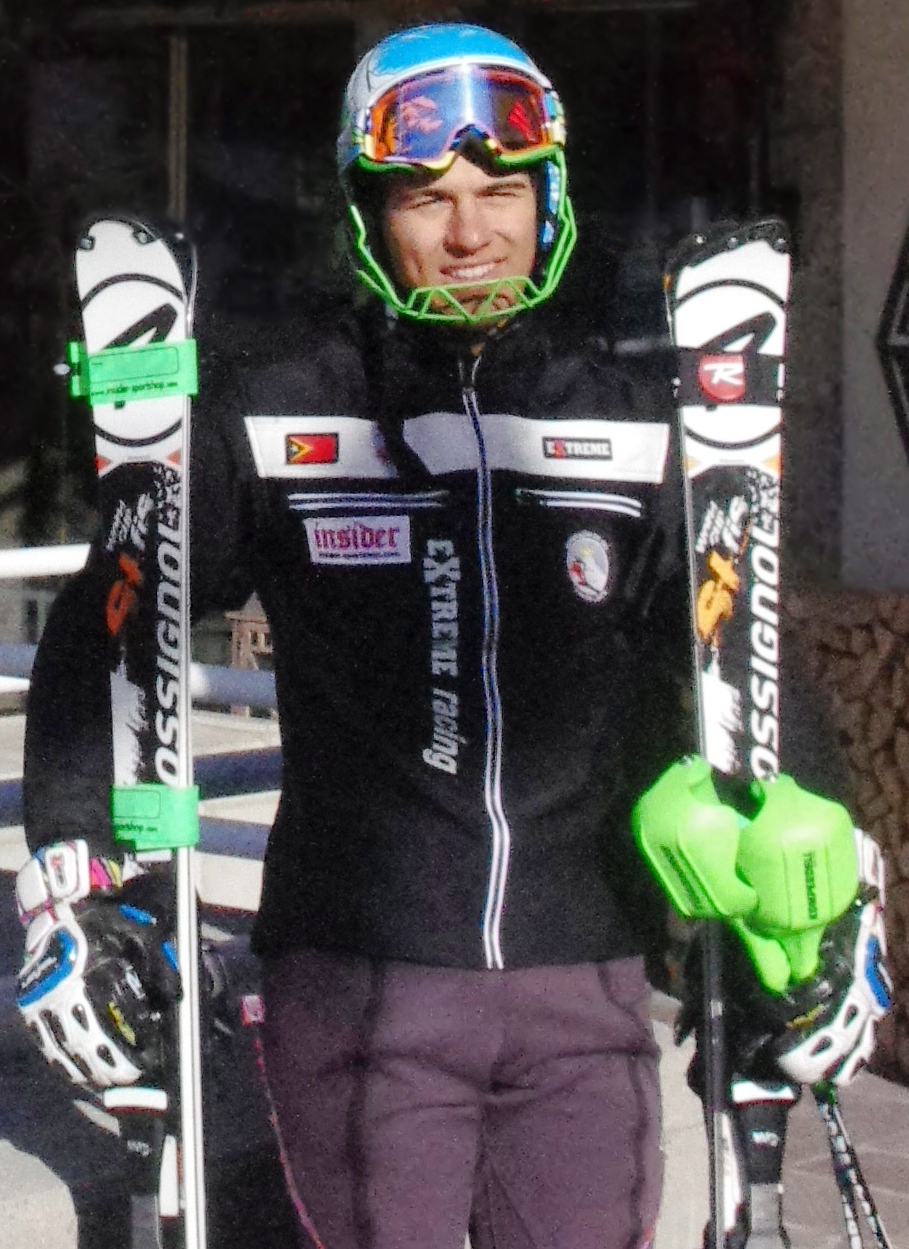
Yohan Goutt Gonçalves was the only athlete representing Timor-Leste at the Games

The basic qualification mark for the slalom event stipulated an average of less than 160 points in the list published by the International Ski Federation (FIS) as on 17 January 2022. The quotas were allocated further based on athletes satisfying other criteria with a maximum of 22 athletes (11 male and 11 female athletes) from a single participating National Olympic Committee. Subject to the other criteria, Timor-Leste was allocated a quota place each in the slalom and giant slalom events at the Games, after Goutt Gonçalves met the basic qualification standard with 129.83 points in slalom and 122.87 points in giant slalom.

Goutt Gonçalves represented Timor-Leste at the Games. He was born on 20 December 1994 at Suresnes, Hauts-de-Seine, France. While his father is French, his mother is from Timor-Leste, which allowed him to compete for the nation. He started competing in international skiing events in 2013 and represented Timor-Leste at three Alpine World Ski Championships. This was his third appearance at the Games, and he was the only member of the Timorese delegation at the 2014 and 2018 Winter Olympics.

In the giant slalom event held on 13 February 2022 at the Yanqing National Alpine Skiing Centre, Goutt Gonçalves completed his first run in 1:21.52 to be ranked 52nd among the 54 competitors. He did not complete his second run and was not classified in the in the overall classification. In the slalom event held on 16 February 2022, he completed his first run in 1:15.48 to be ranked 52nd and last among the 87 competitors who finished their first runs. He completed the course in 1:09.19 in his second run, and was ranked 45th in the classification. With a combined time of 2:24.67, he was classified in 45th and last amongst the classified finishers in the overall classification.

Athlete	Event	Run 1		Run 2		Total	
Athlete	Event	Time	Rank	Time	Rank	Time	Rank
Yohan Goutt Gonçalves	Men's giant slalom	1:21.52	52	DNF			
Yohan Goutt Gonçalves	Men's slalom	1:15.48	52	1:09.19	45	2:24.67	45

== See also ==
- Timor-Leste at the 2017 Asian Winter Games
