= Timor-Leste at the 2018 Winter Olympics =

- IOC code: TLS
- NOC: National Olympic Committee of Timor Leste

in Pyeongchang, South Korea 9–25 February 2018
- Competitors: 1 in 1 sport
- Flag bearer (opening): Yohan Goutt Gonçalves
- Flag bearer (closing): Yohan Goutt Gonçalves
- Medals: Gold 0 Silver 0 Bronze 0 Total 0

Winter Olympics appearances (overview)
- 2014; 2018; 2022; 2026

Timor-Leste competed at the 2018 Winter Olympics held in Pyeongchang, South Korea, from 9 to 25 February 2018. It was the country's second appearance at the Winter Olympics after its debut in the previous Games in 2014.

Timor-Leste was represented by one athlete, the male alpine skier Yohan Goutt Gonçalves. He was the nation's flag bearer during both the opening and closing ceremonies. Timor-Leste did not win any medals at the Games and has never won a Winter Olympics medal.

== Background ==
The National Olympic Committee of Timor Leste (Portuguese: Comitê Olímpico Nacional de Timor-Leste) was formed and recognized by the International Olympic Committee in 2003. While Timor-Leste made its Olympic debut at the 2004 Summer Olympics, it did not compete in the Winter Olympics until the 2014 edition at Sochi.

The 2018 Winter Olympics was held in Pyeongchang, South Korea, from 9 to 25 February 2018. This edition of the Games marked Timor-Leste's second appearance at the Winter Olympics. Yohan Goutt Gonçalves was Timor-Leste's sole representative at the Games and consequently served as the country's flag bearer during both the opening and closing ceremonies. The country did not win a medal at the Games, and has never won a Winter Olympics medal.

== Competitors ==
The Timor-Leste contingent consisted of one athlete competing in a single sport.

Sport	Men	Women	Total
Alpine skiing	1	0	1
Total	1	0	1

== Alpine skiing ==
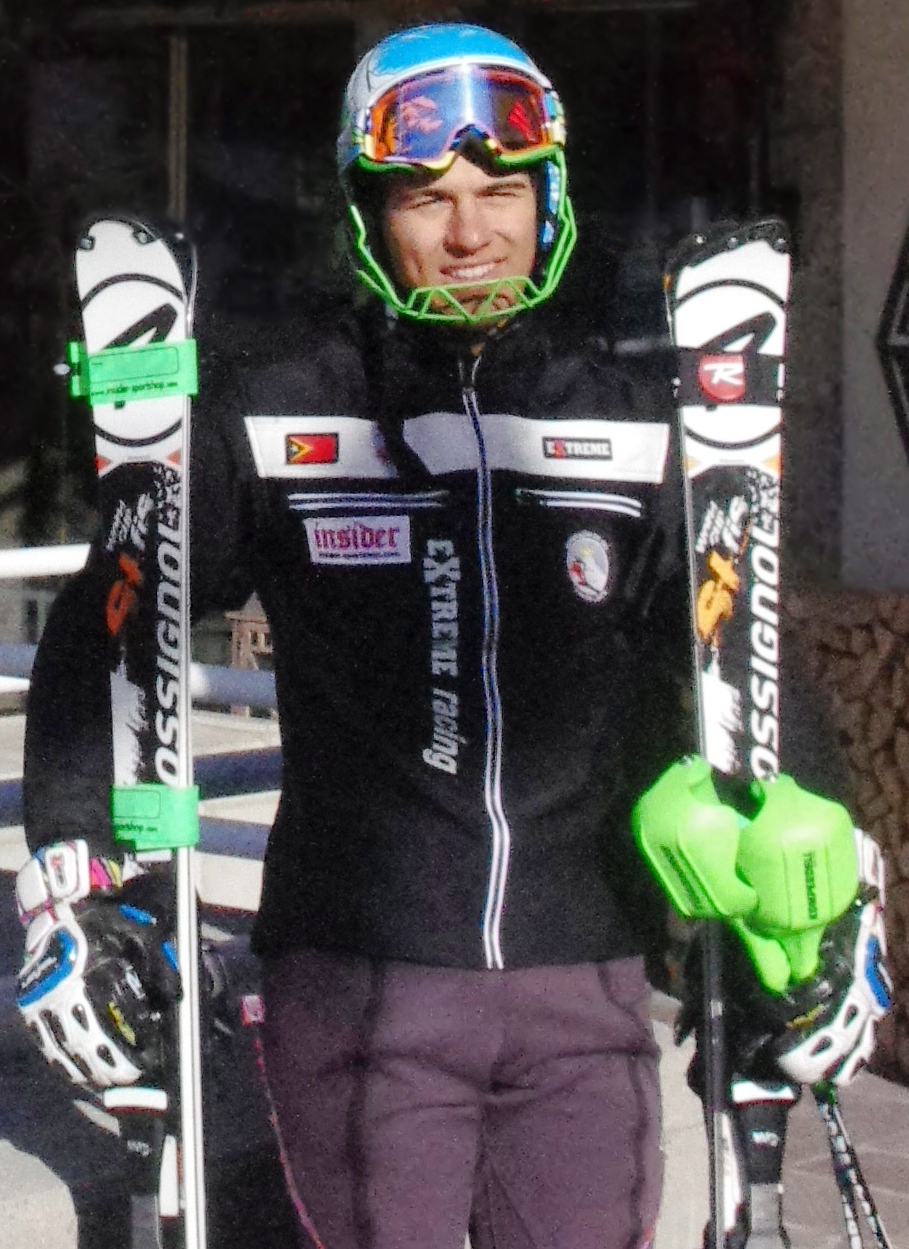
Yohan Goutt Gonçalves was the only athlete representing Timor-Leste at the Games

A maximum of 22 athletes per National Olympic Committee (NOC) were allowed to compete in the alpine skiing events with a maximum of 14 from each gender. For the slalom event, an NOC is eligible to field a competitor if any athlete is ranked in the top 500 on the qualification list published by the International Ski Federation (FIS) on 21 January 2018. For NOC's not meeting the 'A' qualifying standard, the 'B' qualification mark stipulated an average of less than 140 points. As per the final quota allocation published on 28 January 2018, Timor-Leste was allocated one quota place for the slalom event.

Goutt Gonçalves represented Timor-Leste at the Games. He was born on 20 December 1994 at Suresnes, Hauts-de-Seine, France. While his father is French, his mother is from Timor-Leste, which allowed him to compete for the nation. He started competing in international skiing events in 2013 and represented Timor-Leste at the 2015 Alpine World Ski Championships. This was his second appearance at the Games, and he was the only member of the Timorese delegation at the 2014 Winter Olympics.

The slalom event was competed by 106 competitors from 65 countries and was held on 22 February 2018 at the Yongpyong Alpine Centre. He did not complete his first run and was not classified in the final ranking table.

Athlete	Event	Run 1		Run 2		Total	
Athlete	Event	Time	Rank	Time	Rank	Time	Rank
Yohan Goutt Gonçalves	Men's slalom	DNF					

== See also ==
- Timor-Leste at the 2017 Asian Winter Games
