= Timor-Leste at the 2020 Summer Olympics =

- Flag of Timor-Leste
- IOC code: TLS
- NOC: National Olympic Committee of Timor Leste

in Tokyo July 23, 2021 – August 8, 2021
- Competitors: 3 in 2 sports
- Flag bearers (opening): Imelda Ximenes; Felisberto de Deus
- Flag bearer (closing): N/A
- Medals: Gold 0 Silver 0 Bronze 0 Total 0

Summer Olympics appearances (overview)
- 2004; 2008; 2012; 2016; 2020; 2024

Other related appearances
- Individual Olympic Athletes (2000)

Timor-Leste, also known as East Timor and officially as the Democratic Republic of Timor-Leste, competed at the 2020 Summer Olympics in Tokyo. Originally scheduled to take place from 24 July to 9 August 2020, the Games have been postponed to 23 July to 8 August 2021, due to the COVID-19 pandemic. It was the nations fifth appearance at the Summer Olympics.

== Competitors ==
The following is the list of number of competitors in the Games.

Sport	Men	Women	Total
Athletics	1	0	1
Swimming	1	1	2
Total	2	1	3

== Athletics ==
Timor-Leste received a universality slot from the World Athletics to send a male track and field athlete to the Olympics.

Key

- Note–Ranks given for track events are within the athlete's heat only
- Q = Qualified for the next round
- q = Qualified for the next round as a fastest loser or, in field events, by position without achieving the qualifying target
- NR = National record
- N/A = Round not applicable for the event
- Bye = Athlete not required to compete in round

Track & road events

Athlete	Event	Heat		Semifinal		Final	
Athlete	Event	Result	Rank	Result	Rank	Result	Rank
Felisberto de Deus	Men's 1500 m	3:51.03	16	Did not advance			

== Swimming ==
Timor-Leste received a universality invitation from FINA to send two top-ranked swimmers (one per gender) in their respective individual events to the Olympics, based on the FINA Points System of June 28, 2021, heralding the nation's debut in the sport.

Athlete	Event	Heat		Semifinal		Final	
Athlete	Event	Time	Rank	Time	Rank	Time	Rank
José da Silva Viegas	Men's 50 m freestyle	28.59	72	Did not advance			
Imelda Ximenes	Women's 50 m freestyle	32.89	78	Did not advance			
