= Timor-Leste at the 2024 Summer Olympics =

- Flag of Timor-Leste
- IOC code: TLS
- NOC: National Olympic Committee of Timor Leste

in Paris 26 July 2024 – 11 August 2024
- Competitors: 4 (2 men and 2 women) in 3 sports
- Flag bearers (opening): Jolanio Guterres & Ana da Costa da Silva
- Flag bearers (closing): Manuel Ataide & Ana da Costa da Silva
- Medals: Gold 0 Silver 0 Bronze 0 Total 0

Summer Olympics appearances (overview)
- 2004; 2008; 2012; 2016; 2020; 2024

Other related appearances
- Individual Olympic Athletes (2000)

Timor-Leste, also known as East Timor competed at the 2024 Summer Olympics in Paris. It was the country's sixth consecutive appearance at the Summer Olympics.

== Competitors ==
The following is the list of the number of East Timorese competitors in the Games.

| Sport | Men | Women | Total |
|---|---|---|---|
| Athletics | 1 | 0 | 1 |
| Swimming | 1 | 1 | 2 |
| Taekwondo | 0 | 1 | 1 |
| Total | 2 | 2 | 4 |

== Athletics ==
Timor-Leste sent one sprinter to compete at the 2024 Summer Olympics.

Key

- Note–Ranks given for track events are within the athlete's heat only
- Q = Qualified for the next round
- q = Qualified for the next round as a fastest loser or, in field events, by position without achieving the qualifying target
- NR = National record
- N/A = Round not applicable for the event
- Bye = Athlete not required to compete in round

Track events

| Athlete | Event | Heat | | Repechage | | Semifinal | | Final | |
| Athlete | Event | Result | Rank | Result | Rank | Result | Rank | Result | Rank |
|---|---|---|---|---|---|---|---|---|---|
| Manuel Ataide | Men's 100 m | 11.35 | 7 NR | Did not advance | | | | | |

== Swimming ==
Timor-Leste sent two swimmers to compete at the 2024 Paris Olympics, through the allocation of universality places.

| Athlete | Event | Heat | | Semifinal | | Final | |
| Athlete | Event | Time | Rank | Time | Rank | Time | Rank |
|---|---|---|---|---|---|---|---|
| Jolanio Guterres | Men's 50 m freestyle | 30.04 | 71 | Did not advance | | | |
| Imelda Ximenes Belo | Women's 50 m freestyle | 32.48 | 71 | Did not advance | | | |

== Taekwondo ==
For the first time ever, Timor-Leste qualified one athlete to compete in taekwondo. The country received a universality place for Ana Belo.

| Athlete | Event | Qualification | Round of 16 | Quarterfinals | Semifinals | Repechage | Final / BM | |
| Athlete | Event | Opposition Result | Opposition Result | Opposition Result | Opposition Result | Opposition Result | Opposition Result | Rank |
|---|---|---|---|---|---|---|---|---|
| Ana Belo | Women's −49 kg | El-Bouchti (MAR); L 0–2 | Did not advance | | | | | |
