= Timor-Leste at the 2012 Summer Paralympics =

- Flag of Timor-Leste
- IPC code: TLS
- NPC: Comité Paralimpico Nacional de Timor-Leste

in London
- Competitors: 1 in 1 sport
- Medals: Gold 0 Silver 0 Bronze 0 Total 0

Summer Paralympics appearances (overview)
- 2008; 2012; 2016; 2020; 2024

Other related appearances
- Individual Paralympic Athletes (2000)

Timor-Leste competed at the 2012 Summer Paralympics in London, United Kingdom from August 29 to September 9, 2012.

== Athletics ==
Men’s Track and Road Events

Athlete	Event	Heat		Final	
Athlete	Event	Result	Rank	Result	Rank
Filomeno Soares	200m T38	31.47	6	did not advance	
Filomeno Soares	400m T38	1:14.23	5	did not advance	

== See also ==
- Timor-Leste at the 2012 Summer Olympics
