= Timor-Leste at the 2024 Summer Paralympics =

- IPC code: TLS
- NPC: Comité Paralimpico Nacional de Timor-Leste

in Paris, France August 28, 2024 – September 8, 2024
- Competitors: 1 in 1 sport
- Flag bearer: Teofilo Freitas
- Medals: Gold 0 Silver 0 Bronze 0 Total 0

Summer Paralympics appearances (overview)
- 2008; 2012; 2016; 2020; 2024

Other related appearances
- Individual Paralympic Athletes (2000)

Timor-Leste competed at the 2024 Summer Paralympics in Paris, France, from 28 August to 8 September 2024. This was the nation's fourth time competing at the Summer Paralympic Games after it made its debut at the 2008 Summer Paralympics and be absent at the 2020 Summer Paralympics. The delegation consisted of only one competitor from one sport.

== Competitors ==
The following is the list of number of competitors in the Games.

Sport	Men	Women	Total
Athletics	1	0	1
Total	1	0	1

== Athletics ==
Athlete	Event	Final	
Athlete	Event	Result	Rank
Teofilo Freitas	Men's 400 metres T38	55.18	7
Teofilo Freitas	Men's 1500 metres T38	4:30.10	8

== See also ==
- Timor-Leste at the 2024 Summer Olympics
- Timor-Leste at the Paralympics
