= Timor-Leste at the 2016 Summer Paralympics =

- Flag of Timor-Leste
- IPC code: TLS
- NPC: Comité Paralimpico Nacional de Timor-Leste

in Rio de Janeiro
- Competitors: 2 in 1 sport
- Medals: Gold 0 Silver 0 Bronze 0 Total 0

Summer Paralympics appearances (overview)
- 2008; 2012; 2016; 2020; 2024

Other related appearances
- Individual Paralympic Athletes (2000)

Timor-Leste competed at the 2016 Summer Paralympics in Rio de Janeiro, Brazil, 7 September to 18 September, 2016.

== Disability classifications ==
Every participant at the Paralympics has their disability grouped into one of five disability categories; amputation, the condition may be congenital or sustained through injury or illness; cerebral palsy; wheelchair athletes, there is often overlap between this and other categories; visual impairment, including blindness; Les autres, any physical disability that does not fall strictly under one of the other categories, for example dwarfism or multiple sclerosis. Each Paralympic sport then has its own classifications, dependent upon the specific physical demands of competition. Events are given a code, made of numbers and letters, describing the type of event and classification of the athletes competing. Some sports, such as athletics, divide athletes by both the category and severity of their disabilities, other sports, for example swimming, group competitors from different categories together, the only separation being based on the severity of the disability.

== Athletics ==
Track and Road Events

Athlete	Event	Heat		Final	
Athlete	Event	Result	Rank	Result	Rank
Antonio Mendonca	Men's 400m T47	1:06.87	6	did not advance	
Domingas da Costa	Women's 400m T37	1:26.26	6	did not advance	

== See also ==
- Timor-Leste at the 2016 Summer Olympics
