= Timor-Leste at the 2008 Summer Olympics =

- Flag of Timor-Leste
- IOC code: TLS
- NOC: National Olympic Committee of Timor Leste

in Beijing, China 8–24 August 2008
- Competitors: 2 in 1 sports
- Flag bearer: Mariana Diaz Ximenez
- Medals: Gold 0 Silver 0 Bronze 0 Total 0

Summer Olympics appearances (overview)
- 2004; 2008; 2012; 2016; 2020; 2024; 2028

Other related appearances
- Indonesia (1952–1996); Individual Olympic Athletes (2000)

Timor-Leste (East Timor) competed at the 2008 Summer Olympics in Beijing, China which was held from 8 to 24 August. The country's participation at Beijing marked its second appearance in the Summer Olympics since its debut in the 2004 Summer Olympics. The delegation included Augusto Ramos Soares and Mariana Diaz Ximenez, both of whom were marathoners that qualified via wildcard places as the nation had no athletes that met the "A" or "B" qualifying standards. Ximenez was selected as flag bearer for the opening ceremony. Neither of the two athletes finished their events; Soares did not even start.

== Background ==
Timor-Leste participated in two Summer Olympic games between its debut in the 2004 Summer Olympics in Athens, Greece and the 2008 Summer Olympics in Beijing. The National Olympic Committee of Timor-Leste (NOC) selected two athletes via wildcards. Usually, an NOC would be able to enter up to 3 qualified athletes in each individual event as long as each athlete met the "A" standard, or 1 athlete per event if they met the "B" standard. However, since Timor-Leste had no athletes that met either standard, they were allowed to select two athletes, one of each gender, as wildcards. The two athletes that were selected to compete in the Beijing games were Augusto Ramos Soares in the Men's marathon and Mariana Diaz Ximenez in the Women's marathon. Ximenez was flag bearer for the opening ceremony.

== Athletics ==
Making his Summer Olympic debut, Augusto Ramos Soares qualified for the Beijing Games after being granted a wildcard place without competing in any notable sporting event. He was to compete against 97 other athletes in the Men's Marathon but he was one of 3 athletes to not start the event.

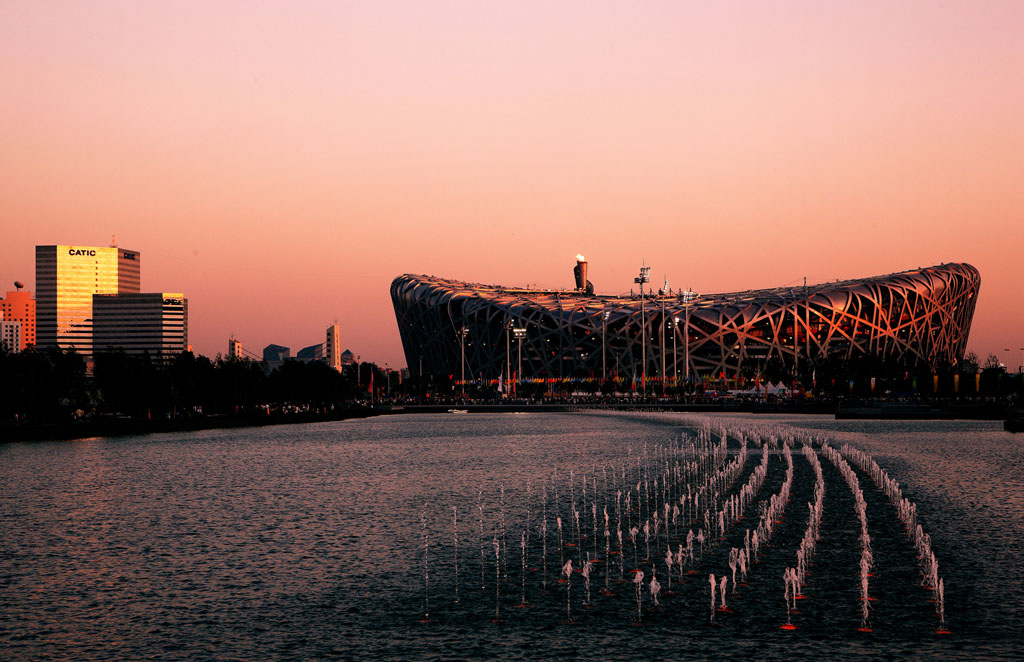
The Beijing National Stadium, where Chebal and Camara marathons finished at

Competing at her first Summer Olympics, Mariana Diaz Ximenez was notable for carrying the Timor-Leste at the opening ceremony. She qualified for the Beijing Games via being granted a wildcard place, after her best time, 3:22:03 hours, was 40:03 minutes slower than the "B" qualifying standard for her event. Ximenez competed against 81 other athletes in the Women's marathon on August 17. Ximenez was one of 13 athletes to not finish the event after suffering a bruised left foot at approximately the 26-kilometre (16 mi) mark.

=== Men's ===
Athlete	Event	Final	
Athlete	Event	Result	Rank
Augusto Ramos Soares	Marathon	DNS	

=== Women's ===
Athlete	Event	Final	
Athlete	Event	Result	Rank
Mariana Diaz Ximenez	Marathon	DNF	
