= Timor-Leste at the 2012 Summer Olympics =

- Flag of Timor-Leste
- IOC code: TLS
- NOC: National Olympic Committee of Timor Leste

in London, United Kingdom 27 July – 12 August 2012
- Competitors: 2 in 1 sports
- Flag bearers: Augusto Ramos Soares (opening); Juventina Napoleão (closing)
- Medals: Gold 0 Silver 0 Bronze 0 Total 0

Summer Olympics appearances (overview)
- 2004; 2008; 2012; 2016; 2020; 2024

Other related appearances
- Individual Olympic Athletes (2000)

Timor-Leste, also known as East Timor and officially as the Democratic Republic of Timor-Leste, competed at the 2012 Summer Olympics in London, held from July 27 to August 12, 2012. This was the nation's fourth appearance at the Olympics, although it was first appeared as part of the Individual Olympic Athletes. Two marathon runners were selected to the team by wildcard places, without having qualified at any sporting event. Timor-Leste, however, has yet to win its first Olympic medal.

Augusto Ramos Soares and Juventina Napoleão were the only Timorese athletes competing at the 2012 Summer Olympics. Soares was coached by Agueda Amaral, one of Timor-Leste's most famous athletes, who represented Timor-Leste at the 2000 Summer Olympics in Sydney, Australia. Unlike Amaral, who trained in a refugee camp, Soares trained in Portugal in mid-June earlier that year.

== Athletics ==
Timor-Leste qualified two runners.

Key

- Note–Ranks given for track events are within the athlete's heat only
- Q = Qualified for the next round
- q = Qualified for the next round as a fastest loser or, in field events, by position without achieving the qualifying target
- NR = National record
- N/A = Round not applicable for the event
- Bye = Athlete not required to compete in round

Men

Augusto Ramos Soares represented Timor-Leste at the London Games as the nation's only male track runner. He had not competed at any Olympic games. The men's marathon took place on August 12, with Soares competing against 109 athletes. The East Timorese athlete finished the competition in 2:45:09 and placed 84th out of the 85 finishing competitors, displacing Tsepo Ramonene of Lesotho (2:55:54) but falling behind Juan Carlos Cardona of Colombia (2:40:13). In comparison, the gold medalist Stephen Kiprotich of Uganda finished in 2:08:01.

Athlete	Event	Final	
Athlete	Event	Result	Rank
Augusto Ramos Soares	Marathon	2:45:09	84

Women

Juventina Napoleão represented Timor-Leste at the London Olympics as its only female track athlete. She had not competed at the Olympic games. The race took place on August 5, with Napoleão facing 117 athletes. She finished the race in 3:05:07, placing 106th out of the 107th athletes; she finished ahead of Caitriona Jennings of Ireland (3:22:11) and behind Ni Lar San of Myanmar (3:04:27). In comparison, Tiki Gelana won the gold medal with an Olympic-record-breaking 2:23:07.

Athlete	Event	Final	
Athlete	Event	Result	Rank
Juventina Napoleão	Marathon	3:05:07 PB	106
