= Timor-Leste at the 2016 Summer Olympics =

- Flag of Timor-Leste
- IOC code: TLS
- NOC: National Olympic Committee of Timor Leste

in Rio de Janeiro, Brazil 5–21 August 2016
- Competitors: 3 in 2 sports
- Flag bearer: Francelina Cabral
- Medals: Gold 0 Silver 0 Bronze 0 Total 0

Summer Olympics appearances (overview)
- 2004; 2008; 2012; 2016; 2020; 2024

Other related appearances
- Indonesia (1952–1996); Individual Olympic Athletes (2000)

Timor-Leste, also known as East Timor and officially as the Democratic Republic of Timor-Leste, competed at the 2016 Summer Olympics in Rio de Janeiro, Brazil, from 5 to 21 August 2016. This was the nation's fourth consecutive appearance at the Summer Olympics.

Three athletes, one man and two women, were selected to the East Timorese roster for the Games, competing only in athletics and mountain biking (the nation's Olympic debut in Rio de Janeiro). Among them were middle-distance runners Nélia Martins and Augusto Ramos Soares, the lone male and returning Olympian, and mountain biker Francelina Cabral, who eventually became the nation's flag bearer in the opening ceremony.

== Background ==
Although East Timorese athletes had competed at the 2000 Summer Olympics in Sydney, New South Wales, Australia, the National Olympic Committee of Timor Leste wasn't officially recognised by the International Olympic Committee (IOC) until 2003. Timor-Leste made its Olympic debut as an independent country at the 2004 Summer Olympics in Athens, Greece. The 2016 Summer Olympics in Rio de Janeiro, Brazil marked their fourth consecutive appearance at the Olympics.

== Competitors ==
In total, three athletes represented Timor-Leste at the 2016 Summer Olympics in Rio de Janeiro, Brazil across two different sports.

Sport	Men	Women	Total
Athletics	1	1	2
Cycling	0	1	1
Total	1	2	3

== Athletics ==
Timor-Leste received universality slots from IAAF to send two athletes (one male and one female) to the Olympics. In total, two East Timorese athletes participated in the athletics events – Augusto Ramos Soares in the men's 1,500 m and Nélia Martins in the women's 1,500 m.

Track & road events

Athlete	Event	Heat		Semifinal		Final	
Athlete	Event	Time	Rank	Time	Rank	Time	Rank
Augusto Ramos Soares	Men's 1,500 m	4:11.35 PB	12	did not advance			
Nélia Martins	Women's 1,500 m	5:00.53	13	did not advance			

== Cycling ==
Timor-Leste received an invitation from Tripartite Commission to send a mountain biker for the women's Olympic cross-country race, signifying the nation's debut in the sport outside of athletics. Previously, two East Timorese athletes competed in weightlifting and boxing under the Olympic flag while awaiting recognition of their national Olympic Committee. In total, one East Timorese athlete participated in the cycling events – Francelina Cabral in the mountain bike women's cross-country.

Athlete	Event	Time	Rank
Francelina Cabral	Women's cross-country	LAP (5 laps)	28
