= Timor-Leste at the 2014 Winter Olympics =

- IOC code: TLS
- NOC: National Olympic Committee of Timor-Leste

in Sochi, Russia 7–23 February 2014
- Competitors: 1 in 1 sport
- Flag bearer (opening): Yohan Goutt Gonçalves
- Flag bearer (closing): Yohan Goutt Gonçalves
- Medals: Gold 0 Silver 0 Bronze 0 Total 0

Winter Olympics appearances (overview)
- 2014; 2018; 2022; 2026

Timor-Leste competed at the 2014 Winter Olympics held in Sochi, Russia, from 7 to 23 February 2014. It was the country's first appearance at the Winter Olympics. The Timorese delegation consisted of one male alpine skier, Yohan Goutt Gonçalves. He was Timor-Leste's flag bearer for both the opening and closing ceremonies. Goutt Gonçalves did not secure a medal in his Olympic debut.

== Background ==
Timor-Leste, a tropical nation, had never sent a delegation to the Winter Olympics prior to the 2014 Games. The country made its official debut in the Summer Olympics at the 2004 Games in Athens, Greece.

Goutt Gonçalves, Timor-Leste's sole representative, was born in Paris to a French father and a Timorese mother. When asked in an interview why he never tried to make the France alpine skiing team, Goutte Gonçalves replied: "It never crossed my mind, because [representing Timor-Leste is] a way of not losing the connection with my country. I have Timorese blood ... and I want to keep that connection." He also commented that he wanted to shine "some positive light" on Timor-Leste.

At a 29 December 2013 race in Serbia, Goutt Gonçalves managed to lower his International Ski Federation point total to below 140 (B standard), qualifying him for the Games. This made him the first athlete from Timor-Leste at any Olympic Games to qualify by meeting the qualification standard, rather than by receiving a wild card, which Goutt Gonçalves had outright refused. To compete at the Games, Goutt Gonçalves had to raise US$75,000, most of which came from himself and his family. As the sole Timorese competitor, Goutt Gonçalves was selected as his country's flag bearer at both the opening and closing ceremonies.

== Alpine skiing ==
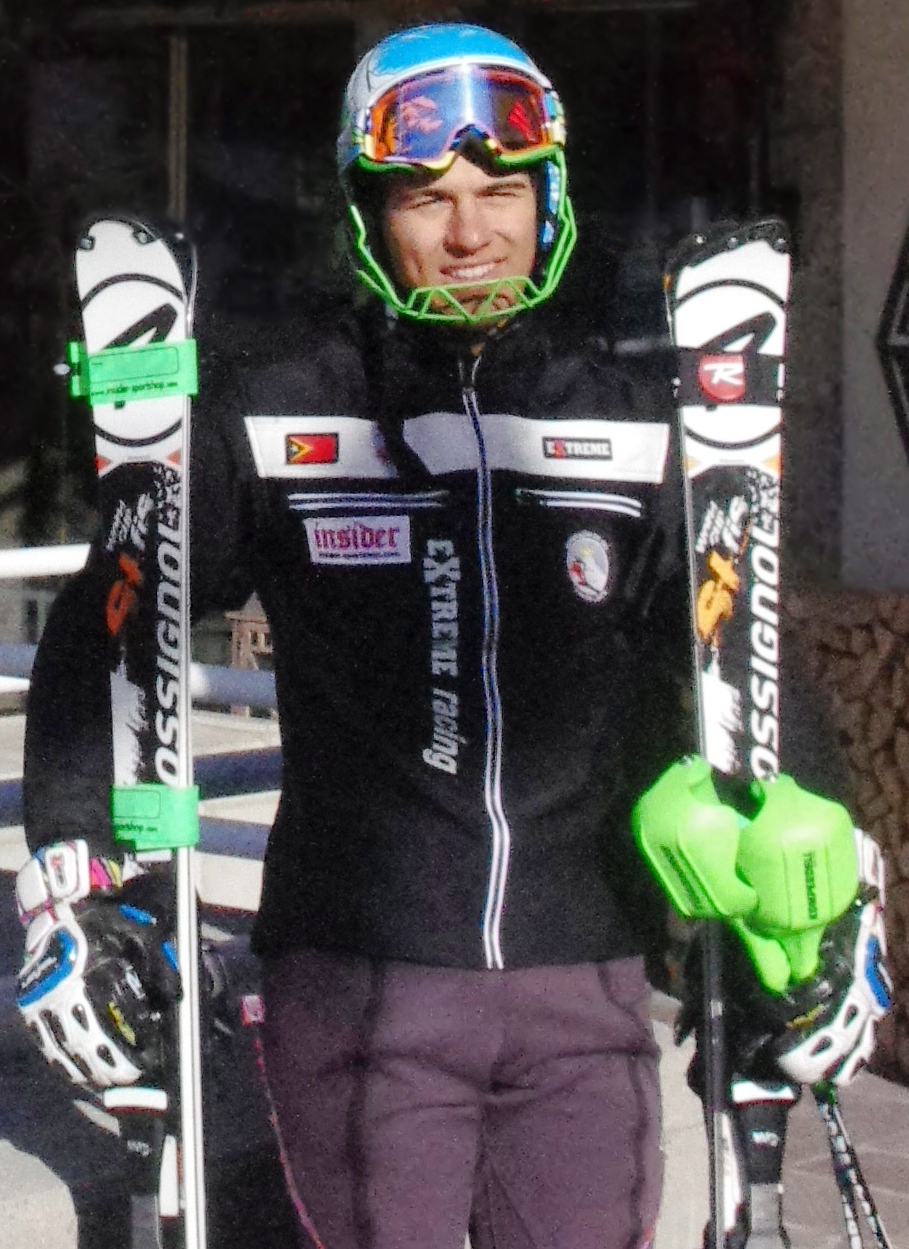
Goutt Gonçalves before the Games, in 2013

According to the final quota allocation for alpine skiing released on 20 January 2014, Timor-Leste had one athlete who qualified for the event (Goutt Gonçalves). Goutt Gonçalves was 19 years old at the time of his Olympic debut. He competed in the men's slalom on 22 February. He placed 77th in the first run with a time of 1 minute and 9.01 seconds; in the second run, he placed 43rd with a time of 1 minute and 21.88 seconds. Overall, he finished 43rd out of the 43 competitors who completed the race, with a total time of 2 minutes and 30.89 seconds.

Athlete	Event	Run 1		Run 2		Total	
Athlete	Event	Time	Rank	Time	Rank	Time	Rank
Yohan Goutt Gonçalves	Men's slalom	1:09.01	77	1:21.88	43	2:30.89	43

== See also ==
- Tropical nations at the Winter Olympics
