= Timor-Leste at the 2008 Summer Paralympics =

- Flag of Timor-Leste
- IPC code: TLS
- NPC: Comité Paralimpico Nacional de Timor-Leste

in Beijing
- Competitors: 1 in 1 sport
- Flag bearer: Liliana da Costa Silva
- Medals: Gold 0 Silver 0 Bronze 0 Total 0

Summer Paralympics appearances (overview)
- 2008; 2012; 2016; 2020; 2024

Other related appearances
- Individual Paralympic Athletes (2000)

Timor-Leste sent a delegation to compete at the 2008 Summer Paralympics in Beijing, China. However, official records give no indication that more than one East Timorese athlete (16-year-old powerlifter Lily Costa Silva) eventually entered competition. Costa Silva was also listed as the country's flagbearer for both the opening and the closing ceremonies.

== Powerlifting ==
Athlete	Event	Result	Rank
Liliana da Costa Silva	-52 kg	No Mark	-

== See also ==
- Timor-Leste at the Paralympics
- Timor-Leste at the 2008 Summer Olympics
