= List of East Timorese records in athletics =

Athletics records of East Timur

The following are the national records in athletics in East Timor maintained by its national athletics federation: Federaçao Timor-Leste de Atletismo (FTA).

== Outdoor ==
Key to tables: Awaiting ratification Record not kept by FTA

=== Men ===
Event	Record	Athlete	Date	Event	Location	Ref.
100 m	11.35 (+0.1 m/s)	Manuel Ataide	3 August 2024	Olympic Games	Paris, France	
200 m	23.89	J. Mezias	9 September 1994	Asian Junior Championships	Jakarta, Indonesia	
400 m	50.79	Domingos Salio dos Santos	12 June 2015	Southeast Asian Games	Kallang, Singapore	
800 m	1:55.24	Manuel Ataide	10 May 2023	Southeast Asian Games	Phnom Penh, Cambodia	
1500 m	3:51.03	Felisberto de Deus	3 August 2021	Olympic Games	Tokyo, Japan	
3000 m	9:10.51	Júlio da Cruz	14 June 1990		Jakarta, Indonesia	
5000 m	14:35.17	Aries José Pariera	22 August 1997		Jakarta, Indonesia	
10,000 m	31:22.21	Año Alves	11 September 1996		Jakarta, Indonesia	
Half marathon	1:07:47.31	Augusto Ramos Soares	21 March 2010	Dili Half Marathon	Dili, East Timor	
Marathon	2:26:46	Romenio de Deus Maia	19 August 2017		Dili, East Timor	
110 m hurdles						
400 m hurdles						
3000 m steeplechase	9:14.4 h	Aries José Pariera	21 May 1993		Jakarta, Indonesia	
High jump						
Pole vault						
Long jump						
Triple jump						
Shot put	11.03 m	I. Nyiman Sukesna	September 1981		Jakarta, Indonesia	
Discus throw						
Hammer throw						
Javelin throw	33.44 m	Felismino Alipio	11 August 2015		Dili, East Timor	
Decathlon						
Decathlon	100m / Long jump / Shot put / High jump / 400m / 110m H / Discus / Pole vault / Javelin / 1500m					
20 km walk (road)						
50 km walk (road)						
4 × 100 m relay						
4 × 400 m relay	3:42.6 h	Ermera Team; R. Amaral Soares; T. da Silva; F. de Deus; M. Amaral Ataide	3 May 2024	National Championships	Dili, East Timor	

=== Women ===
Event	Record	Athlete	Date	Event	Location	Ref.
100 m	13.57	Jesaltina de Jesus Guterres	21 May 2001		Darwin, Australia	
200 m	28.30	Jesaltina de Jesus Guterres	20 May 2001		Darwin, Australia	
400 m						
800 m	2:08.07	Jeseltina	26 January 1991		Bali, Indonesia	
1500 m	4:29.96	Angela Freitas de Fatima Araujo	24 April 2019	Asian Championships	Doha, Qatar	
3000 m	9:41.94	Aguida Amaral	3 December 1991		Jakarta, Indonesia	
5000 m	17:08.87	Aguida Amaral	24 October 1989		Jakarta, Indonesia	
10,000 m	37:04.17	Aguida Amaral	September 1988		Jakarta, Indonesia	
Half marathon	1:24:06	Juventina Napoleon	21 March 2010	Dili Half Marathon	Dili, East Timor	
Marathon	3:03:53	Aguida Amaral	12 December 2003		Hanoi, Vietnam	
100 m hurdles						
400 m hurdles						
3000 m steeplechase	11:42.94	Nélia Martins	5 June 2016	Asian Junior Championships	Ho Chi Minh City, Vietnam	
High jump						
Pole vault						
Long jump						
Triple jump						
Shot put	10.01 m	Ana Maria	20 March 2005		Dili, East Timor	
Discus throw						
Hammer throw						
Javelin throw						
Heptathlon						
Heptathlon	100m H / High jump / Shot put / 200m / Long jump / Javelin / 800m					
20 km walk (road)						
50 km walk (road)						
4 × 100 m relay						
4 × 400 m relay	4:52.5 h	Ermera Team; N. Martins; J. de Jesus; M. da Costa; R. F. Martins	3 May 2024	National Championships	Dili, East Timor	

== Indoor ==
=== Men ===
Event	Record	Athlete	Date	Meet	Place	Ref.
60 m						
200 m						
400 m	1:00.01	Idelfonso Dos Santos	30 October 2007	Asian Indoor Games	Macau	
800 m						
1500 m						
3000 m	9:37.67	Augusto Ramos Soares	1 November 2007	Asian Indoor Games	Macau	
60 m hurdles						
High jump						
Pole vault						
Long jump						
Triple jump						
Shot put						
Heptathlon						
Heptathlon	60m / Long jump / Shot put / High jump / 60m H / Pole vault / 1000m					
5000 m walk						
4 × 400 m relay						

=== Women ===
Event	Record	Athlete	Date	Meet	Place	Ref.
60 m						
200 m						
400 m						
800 m						
1500 m	5:11.99	Imes Borges Da Silva	31 October 2007	Asian Indoor Games	Macau	
3000 m						
60 m hurdles						
High jump						
Pole vault						
Long jump						
Triple jump						
Shot put						
Pentathlon						
Pentathlon	60m H / High jump / Shot put / Long jump / 800m					
3000 m walk						
4 × 400 m relay						
