= Timor-Leste at the Paralympics =

- Flag of Timor-Leste
- IPC code: TLS
- NPC: Comité Paralimpico Nacional de Timor-Leste
- Medals: Gold 0 Silver 0 Bronze 0 Total 0

Summer appearances
- 2008; 2012; 2016; 2020; 2024

Other related appearances
- Individual Paralympic Athletes (2000)

Timor-Leste first sent competitors to the Paralympic Games for the 2000 Summer Games in Sydney. The country at that time administered by the United Nations, and its athletes participated as "Individual Paralympic Athletes". There were only two: Alcino Pereira in track & field, in the men's 5,000m race (T38 category); and Mateus Lukas in men's powerlifting, in the up to 48 kg category. Pereira failed to complete his race, while Lukas lifted 105 kg, finishing 13th and last of the athletes who successfully lifted a weight in his category.

Formally recognised in 2002, Timor-Leste participated in the 2004 Summer Olympics, but not in the Paralympics that same year. Timor-Leste, as such, made its Paralympic Games début at the 2008 Summer Paralympics in Beijing, with a single representative (Lily Costa Silva) in powerlifting. Competing in the women's up to 52 kg category, Costa Silva failed to successfully lift a weight, and did not record a mark.

Timor-Leste has never taken part in the Winter Paralympics.

== Full results for Timor-Leste at the Paralympics ==
Name	Games	Sport	Event	Score	Rank
Lily Costa Silva	2008 Beijing	Powerlifting	Women's up to 52 kg	nmr	nmr (unranked)
Filomeno Soares	2012 London	Athletics	Men's 200 m T38	34.47	6th in heat 1; did not advance
Filomeno Soares	2012 London	Athletics	Men's 400 m T38	1:14.23	5th in heat 2; did not advance
Antonio Mendonca	2016 Rio	Athletics	Men's 400 m T47	1:06.87	6th in heat 1; did not advance
Domingas da Costa	2016 Rio	Athletics	Women's 400 m T37	1:26.26	6th in heat 2; did not advance
Teofilo Freitas	2024 Paris	Athletics	Men's 400 m T38	55.18	7th
Teofilo Freitas	2024 Paris	Athletics	Men's 1500 m T38	4:30.10	8th

== See also ==
- Individual Paralympic Athletes at the 2000 Summer Paralympics
- Timor-Leste at the Olympics
