= Sport in Timor-Leste =

Timor-Leste is a relatively new country. As one of the world's poorest countries, athletic activities are limited at the professional level.

== International sports associations ==
Timor-Leste belongs to numerous international sport associations, including the International Olympic Committee (IOC). The IOC board has granted full recognition to the East Timorese Olympic Committee (COTL). The IOC allowed a symbolic four-member East Timor team to take part in the 2000 Sydney Games under the Olympic flag as "Independent Olympic Athletes." The Federação Timor-Leste de Atletismo had joined the International Association of Athletics Federations (IAAF). The Federação de Badminton de Timor-Leste joined the International Badminton Federation (IBF) in April 2003. The Timor-Leste Cycling Federation joined the Union Cycliste Internationale. Confederacao do Desporto de Timor Leste also joined the International Weightlifting Federation. Timor-Leste is also a full member of the International Table-Tennis Federation (ITTF). In September 2005, the Timor-Leste national football team joined FIFA, while the men's national basketball team joined FIBA in 2013. On July 20 2025, during the ICC Annual General Meeting, held in Singapore, Timor Leste became the 110th member of the ICC.

== Participation in international events ==
Timor-Leste has taken part in multiple international sporting events. Although the athletes came back with no medals, East Timorese athletes had the opportunity to compete with other Southeast Asian athletes in the 2003 Southeast Asian Games held in Vietnam in 2003. In the 2003 ASEAN Paralympics Games, also held in Vietnam, Timor-Leste won a bronze medal. In the Athens 2004 Olympic Games, six athletes participated in three sports: athletics, weightlifting and boxing. Timor-Leste won three medals in Arnis at the 2005 Southeast Asian Games. Timor-Leste was one of the competing nations in the first Lusophony Games, winning a bronze medal in the women's volleyball competition (finishing third out of three teams, despite the fact the team lost all three games in which it competed). On 30 October 2008, Timor-Leste earned their first international points in a FIFA match with a 2–2 draw against Cambodia.

== See also ==
- Sports in Asia
- Timor-Leste at the Olympics
- National Olympic Committee of Timor Leste
- Football Federation of Timor-Leste
