= Athletics at the 2013 SEA Games – Women's marathon =

The women's marathon at the 2013 SEA Games, the athletics was held in Naypyidaw, Myanmar. The track and field events took place at the Wunna Theikdi Stadium on December 16.

== Schedule ==
All times are Myanmar Standard Time (UTC+06:30)

Date	Time	Event
Monday, 16 December 2013	06:30	Final

== Records ==
Prior to this competition, the existing world, Asian, and Southeast Asian Games records were as follows.

World Record	Paula Radcliffe (GBR)	2:15:25	London, United Kingdom	13 April 2003
Asian Record	Mizuki Noguchi (JPN)	2:19:12	Berlin, Germany	25 September 2005
Games Record	Ruwiyati (INA)	2:34:29	Chiang Mai, Thailand	13 December 1995

== Results ==
Legend

- DNF — Did Not Finish

Rank	Athlete	Time	Notes
1st place, gold medalist(s)	Thi Binh Pham (VIE)	2:45:34	NR
2nd place, silver medalist(s)	Myint Myint Aye (MYA)	2:46:07	
3rd place, bronze medalist(s)	Pa Pa (MYA)	2:49:01	
4	Juventina Napoleao (TLS)	3:06:55	
—	Meri Meriana Paijo (INA)	DNF	
