= Yao Ping =

Chinese cyclist

Yao Ping (born March 19, 1993) is a Chinese cross-country cyclist. She placed 24th in the women's cross-country race at the 2016 Summer Olympics.
