= Rômulo Wagner =

Brazilian long-distance runner

Personal information
- Nationality: Brazilian
- Born: 26 May 1977 (age 49)

Sport
- Sport: Long-distance running
- Event: Marathon

Rômulo Wagner (born 26 May 1977) is a Brazilian long-distance runner. He competed in the men's marathon at the 2004 Summer Olympics. Romulo personal best score is 11:28 in 2004 Summer Olympics. Wagner name has been listed on the Olympedia.
