= Gil da Cruz Trindade =

Athletics competitor (born 1982)

Gil da Cruz Trindade (born 1 March 1982) is an athlete from East Timor. He was the first, along with Aguida Amaral, to represent East Timor at the Olympics, competing in the marathon of the 2004 Summer Olympics in Athens, Greece. Trindade entered the race at the invitation of the International Olympic Committee, who sent him $250 and a plane ticket to Greece. While his only wish was to finish the race, Trindade failed to do so.

== Achievements ==
- All results regarding marathon, unless stated otherwise

Year	Competition	Venue	Position	Notes
Representing Timor-Leste
2004	Olympic Games	Athens, Greece	—	DNF
