= Cycling at the 2016 Summer Olympics – Women's cross-country =

Location of women's cross-country cycling event at 2016 Summer Olympics

Women's cross-country cycling at the Games of the XXXI Olympiad
- Venue: Mountain Bike Centre
- Date: 20 August
- Competitors: 29 from 23 nations
- Winning time: 1h 30' 15"

Medalists
1st place, gold medalist(s)		Jenny Rissveds	Sweden
2nd place, silver medalist(s)		Maja Włoszczowska	Poland
3rd place, bronze medalist(s)		Catharine Pendrel	Canada

The women's cross-country cycling event at the 2016 Summer Olympics in Rio de Janeiro took place at the Mountain Bike Centre on 20 August.

The medals were presented by Tricia Smith, IOC member, Canada and Emin Muftuoglu, Member of the UCI Management Committee.

== Format ==
The competition began at 12:30 pm with a mass-start. The length of the course was 29.67 km (0.57 km + 6 laps of 4.85 km each).

== Schedule ==
All times are Brasília time

Date	Time	Round
Saturday, 20 August 2016	12:30	Final

== Start list and result ==
No.	Rider	Country	UCI rank	Pos.	Time
7	Jenny Rissveds	Sweden	6	1st place, gold medalist(s)	1h 30' 15"
5	Maja Włoszczowska	Poland	4	2nd place, silver medalist(s)	1h 30' 52"
10	Catharine Pendrel	Canada	9	3rd place, bronze medalist(s)	1h 31' 41"
9	Emily Batty	Canada	8	4	1h 31' 43"
16	Kateřina Nash	Czech Republic	17	5	1h 32' 25"
4	Jolanda Neff	Switzerland	3	6	1h 32' 43"
22	Lea Davison	United States	27	7	1h 33' 27"
8	Linda Indergand	Switzerland	7	8	1h 33' 27"
6	Yana Belomoyna	Ukraine	5	9	1h 33' 28"
13	Gunn-Rita Dahle Flesjå	Norway	13	10	1h 33' 34"
2	Annika Langvad	Denmark	1	11	1h 33' 48"
19	Helen Grobert	Germany	23	12	1h 34' 08"
18	Tanja Žakelj	Slovenia	21	13	1h 35' 17"
23	Chloe Woodruff	United States	29	14	1h 36' 17"
20	Anne Terpstra	Netherlands	24	15	1h 36' 33"
14	Daniela Campuzano	Mexico	15	16	1h 36' 33"
25	Irina Kalentieva	Russia	33	17	1h 36' 54"
21	Eva Lechner	Italy	26	18	1h 38' 45"
3	Sabine Spitz	Germany	2	19	1h 39' 16"
11	Raiza Goulão	Brazil	10	20	1h 39' 21"
17	Githa Michiels	Belgium	18	21	1h 40' 23"
24	Iryna Popova	Ukraine	30	22	1h 41' 29"
26	Perrine Clauzel	France	37	23	1h 42' 23"
31	Yao Ping	China	478	24	1h 43' 20"
12	Rebecca Henderson	Australia	11	2 Lap	—
29	Michelle Vorster	Namibia	96	2 Lap	—
15	Jovana Crnogorac	Serbia	16	2 Lap	—
30	Francelina Cabral	Timor-Leste	325	5 Lap	—
28	Pauline Ferrand-Prévot	France	83	DNF	—
