= Juventina Napoleão =

East Timorese long-distance runner

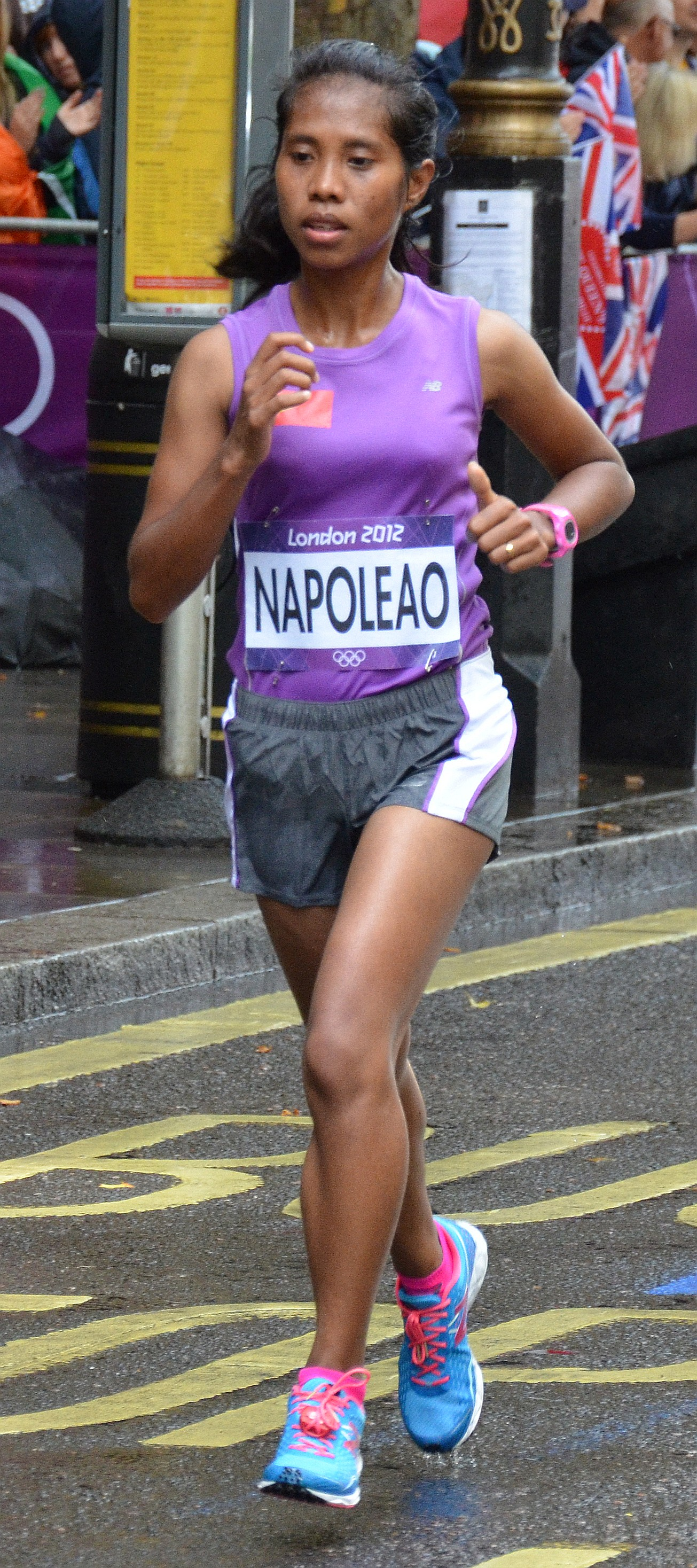
- Juventina Napoleão in the marathon event at the 2012 Summer Olympics

Personal information
- Born: December 22, 1988 (age 37) Assalaino, East Timor, Indonesia
- Height: 1.54 m (5 ft 1/2 in)
- Weight: 48 kg (106 lb)

Sport
- Country: Timor-Leste
- Sport: Athletics
- Event: Marathon

Juventina Napoleão (born 22 December 1988 in Assalaino, East Timor, Indonesia) is an East Timorese long-distance runner. She represented her country in the marathon event at the 2012 Summer Olympics and finished the race with a time of 3:05:07.

== Athletics career ==
The 154 cm tall athlete is a member of the Association Lautém sports club in Lospalos.

At the first Dili Marathon (2010) she finished second in the women's race in a time of 3.13:05. In the following year, she was first, in a time of 3:08.28. In 2012, she came first in the Dili half marathon.

At the 2010 Asian Games, she was unable to finish the marathon. She finished the 2012 Tokyo Marathon in 48th place, in a time of 3:05.15.

At the 2012 Summer Olympics, she was the penultimate runner to finish the women's marathon, finishing in 106th place. She finished in a time of 3:05.07, a new personal best.

For the 2012 Olympics, her trainer was the East Timorese coach, António Dacosta. In the build up to the 2013 Dili Marathon, she trained with Calisto Da Costa, who himself ran for East Timor at the 2000 Olympics.

She competed in the South East Asian Games in 2013, achieving a time of 3:06:55
