= Mpesela Ntlot Soeu =

Lesotho long-distance runner

Personal information
- Nationality: Lesotho
- Born: 17 January 1977 (age 49)

Sport
- Sport: Long-distance running
- Event: Marathon

Mpesela Ntlot Soeu (born 17 January 1977) is a Lesotho long-distance runner. He competed in the men's marathon at the 2004 Summer Olympics.
