= 2016 Summer Olympics Parade of Nations =

During the Parade of Nations within the Rio de Janeiro 2016 Summer Olympics opening ceremony, athletes and officials from each participating team marched in the Maracanã Stadium preceded by their flag and placard bearer. Each flag bearer had been chosen either by the team's National Olympic Committee or by the athletes themselves.

== Parade order ==
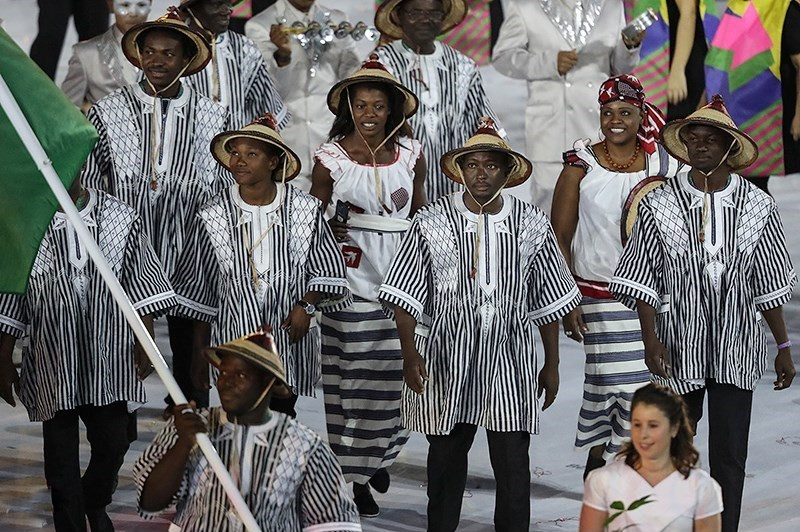
Burkina Faso representation during the parade

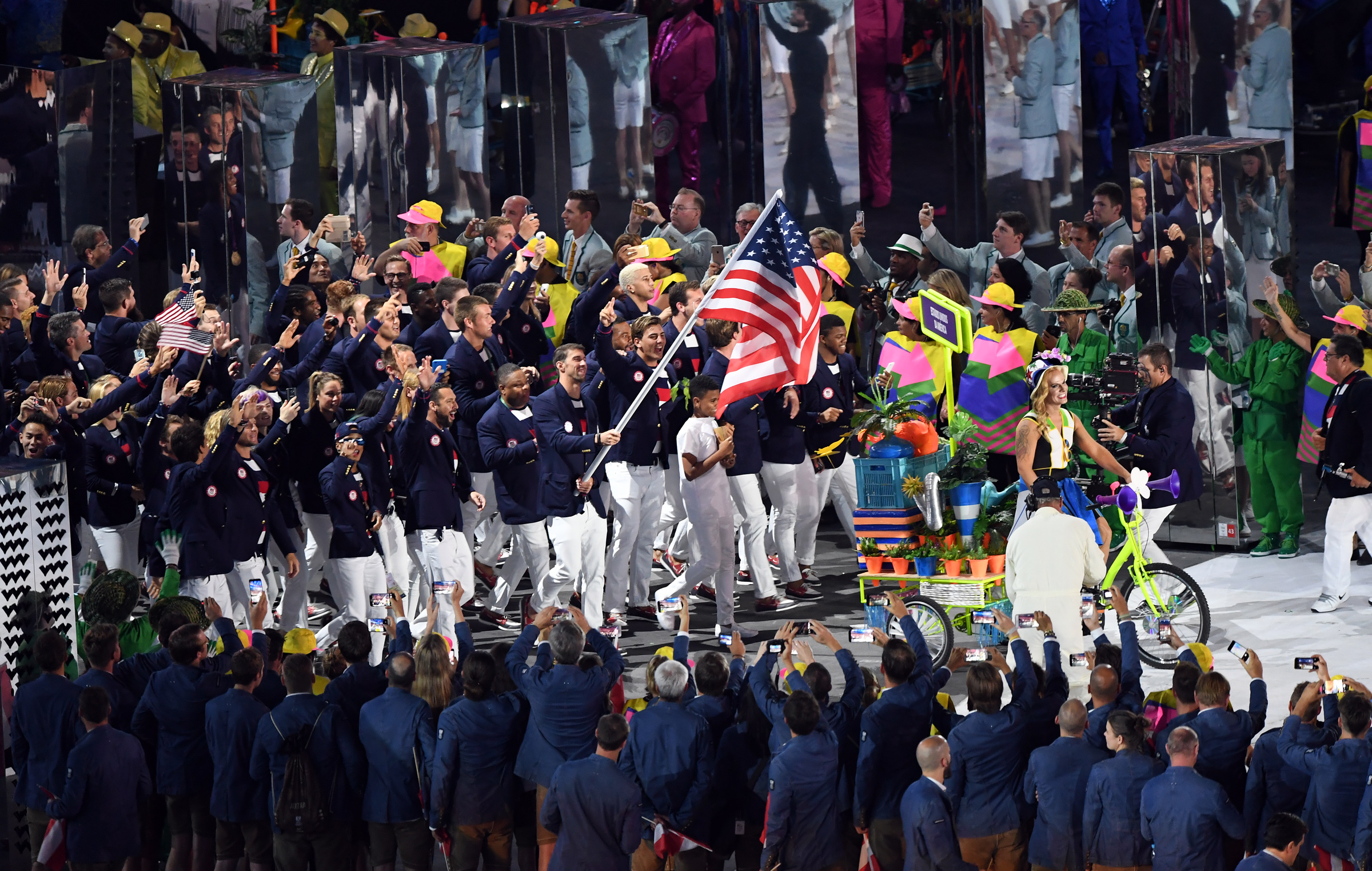
Michael Phelps carrying the flag on behalf of athletes from the United States

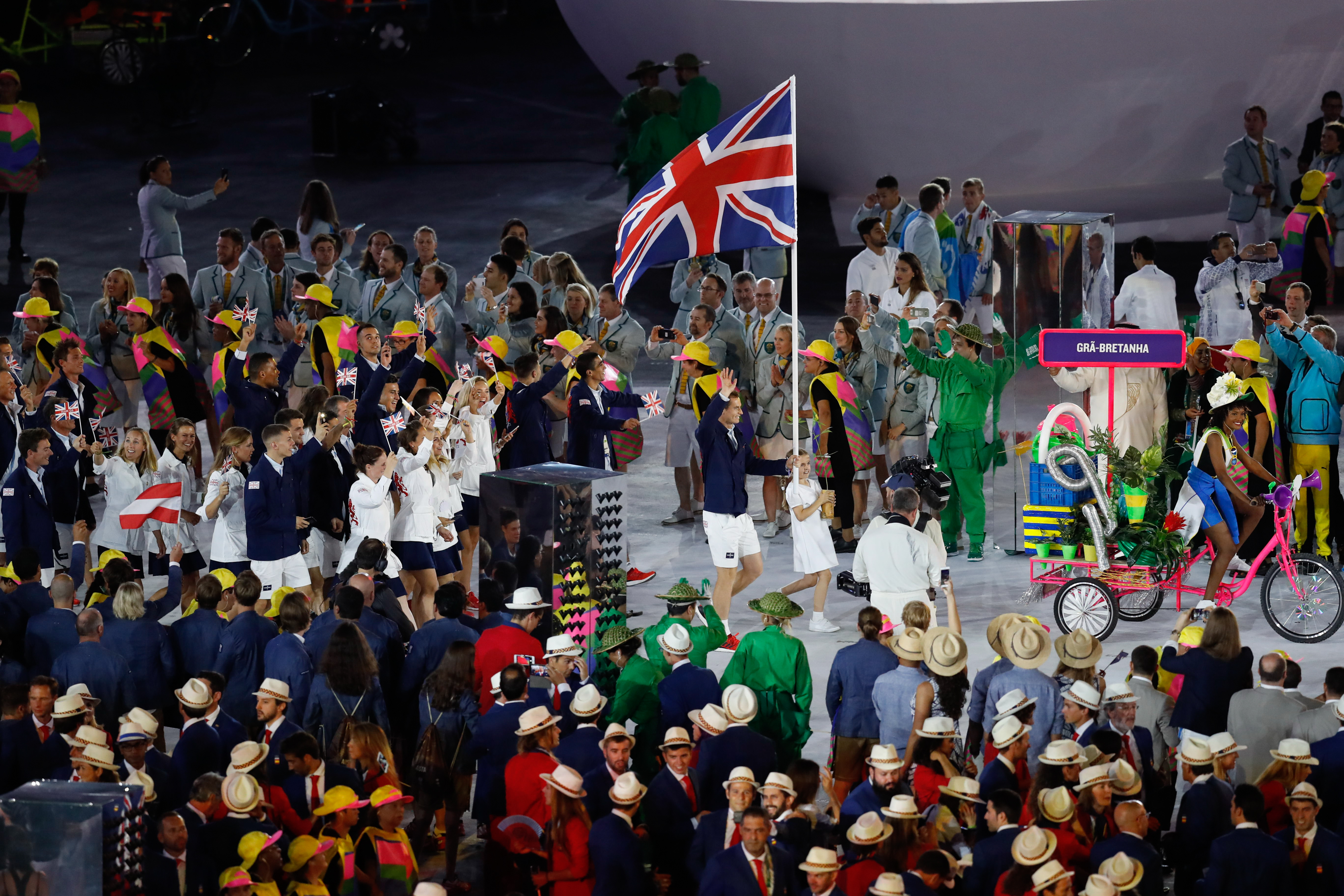
Great Britain entering the stadium with tennis star Andy Murray carrying the flag

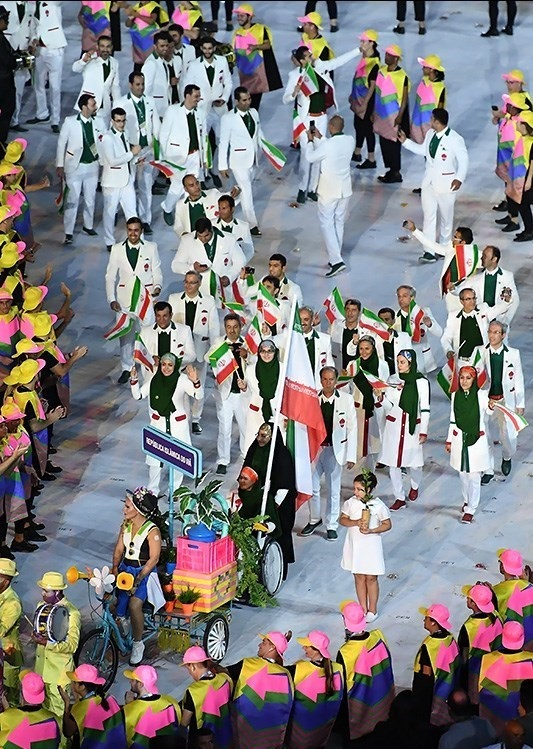
Iran entering the stadium with paralyzed Zahra Nemati carrying the flag

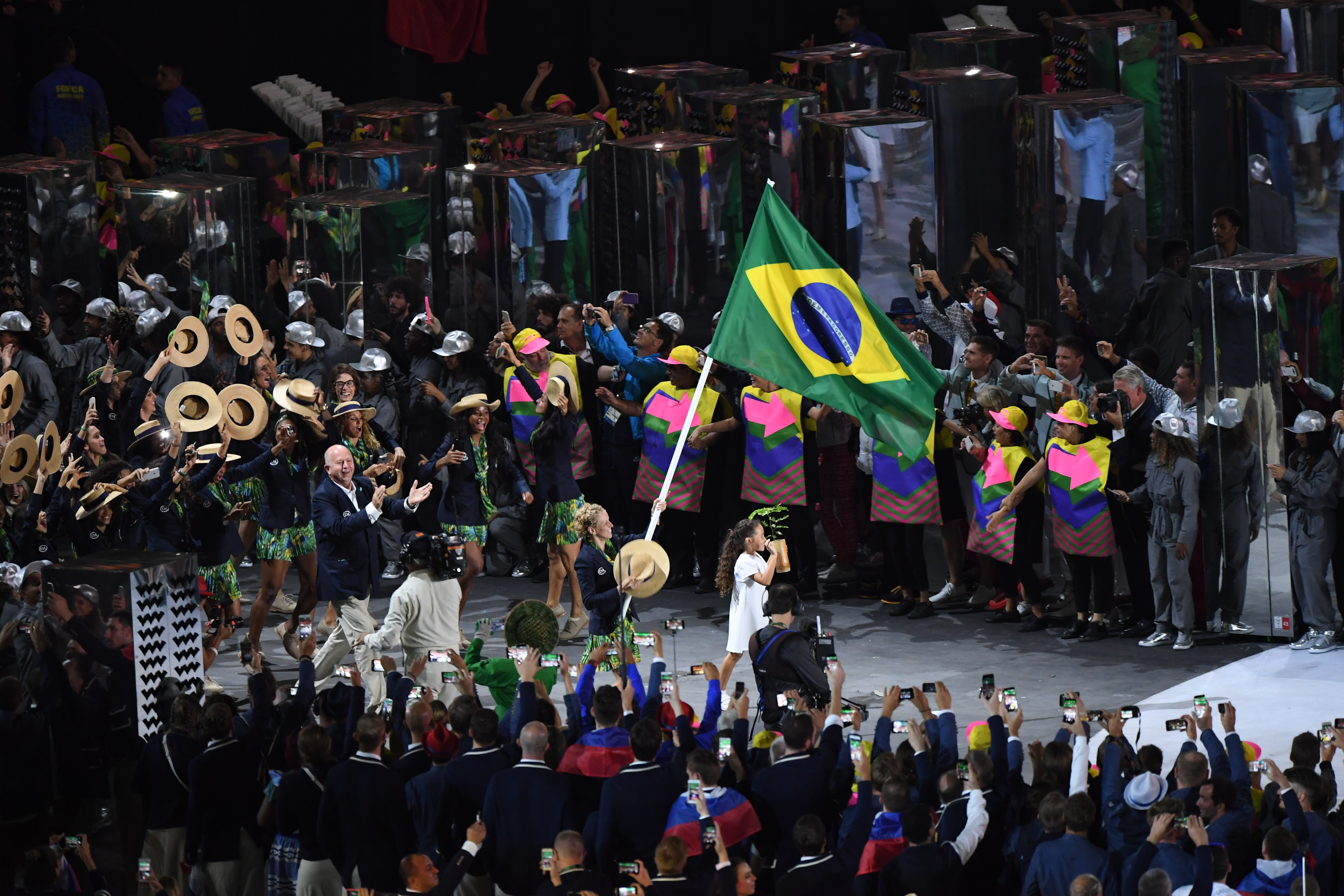
Athletes from host nation Brazil with flagbearer Yane Marques at center closing the parade

Greece entered first, as the nation of the ancient and first modern Olympic Games. The host nation Brazil marched last. Other teams entered in alphabetical order in the language of the host country (Portuguese), according with tradition and IOC guidelines. Announcers in the stadium read off the names of the marching teams in French and English (the official languages of the Olympics) as well as Portuguese, with music accompanying the athletes as they marched into the stadium.

While most countries entered teams under their short names, a few entered under more formal or alternative names, sometimes due to political or naming disputes or for historical reasons. North Macedonia entered as "Former Yugoslav Republic of Macedonia'" (Portuguese: Ex-República Iugoslava da Macedônia) under E because of the naming dispute with Greece until 2020. The People's Republic of China (commonly known as China), entered as the "People's Republic of China" (República Popular da China) under C. The Republic of the Congo entered as just "Congo", right before the Democratic Republic of the Congo, which entered under its full name (República Democrática do Congo). Similarly, South Korea entered as "Republic of Korea" (República da Coreia) under C while North Korea entered as "Democratic People's Republic of Korea" (República Popular Democrática da Coreia). The team from the United Kingdom entered under Great Britain, for historical reasons. Additionally, Brunei, Ivory Coast, the United States, Hong Kong, Iran, Laos, Moldova, Russia, Syria, Tanzania, Timor-Leste, the United States Virgin Islands, and the British Virgin Islands all entered under their formal names, respectively "Brunei Darussalam" (Brunei Darussalam), "Côte d’Ivoire" (Costa do Marfim), "United States of America" (Estados Unidos da América), "Hong Kong, China" (Hong Kong, China), "Islamic Republic of Iran" (República Islâmica do Irã), "Lao People's Democratic Republic" (República Popular Democrática do Laos), "Republic of Moldova" (República da Moldova), "Russian Federation" (Federação da Rússia), "Syrian Arab Republic" (República Árabe da Síria), "United Republic of Tanzania" (República Unida da Tanzânia), "Democratic Republic of Timor-Leste" (República Democrática de Timor-Leste), "American Virgin Islands" (Ilhas Virgens Americanas), and "British Virgin Islands" (Ilhas Virgens Britânicas).

The Refugee Olympic Team, composed of refugees from several countries, went second to last and received a standing ovation.

Host nation Brazil entered the stadium while the song "Aquarela do Brasil" was being played on the speakers.

== Teams and flagbearers ==
Below is a list of parading teams their announced flag bearer in the same order as the parade. Names are given in the form officially designated by the IOC.

Order	Team	Brazilian Portuguese name	Flag bearer	Sport
1	Greece	Grécia	Sofia Bekatorou	Sailing
2	Afghanistan	Afeganistão	Mohammad Tawfiq Bakhshi	Judo
3	South Africa	África do Sul	Wayde van Niekerk	Athletics
4	Albania	Albânia	Luiza Gega	Athletics
5	Germany	Alemanha	Timo Boll	Table tennis
6	Andorra	Andorra	Laura Sallés	Judo
7	Angola	Angola	Luísa Kiala	Handball
8	Antigua and Barbuda	Antígua e Barbuda	Daniel Bailey	Athletics
9	Saudi Arabia	Arábia Saudita	Sulaiman Hamad	Judo
10	Algeria	Argélia	Sonia Asselah	Judo
11	Argentina	Argentina	Luis Scola	Basketball
12	Armenia	Armênia	Vahan Mkhitaryan	Swimming
13	Aruba	Aruba	Nicole van der Velden	Sailing
14	Independent Olympic Athletes	Atletas Olímpicos Independentes	Volunteer	
15	Australia	Austrália	Anna Meares	Cycling
16	Austria	Áustria	Liu Jia	Table tennis
17	Azerbaijan	Azerbaijão	Teymur Mammadov	Boxing
18	Bahamas	Bahamas	Shaunae Miller	Athletics
19	Bangladesh	Bangladesh	Siddikur Rahman	Golf
20	Barbados	Barbados	Ramon Gittens	Athletics
21	Bahrain	Bareine	Farhan Saleh	Swimming
22	Belarus	Belarus	Vasil Kiryienka	Cycling
23	Belgium	Bélgica	Olivia Borlée	Athletics
24	Belize	Belize	Brandon Jones	Athletics
25	Benin	Benim	Yémi Apithy	Fencing
26	Bermuda	Bermudas	Tyrone Smith	Athletics
27	Bolivia	Bolívia	Ángela Castro	Athletics
28	Bosnia and Herzegovina	Bósnia-Herzegovina	Amel Tuka	Athletics
29	Botswana	Botsuana	Nijel Amos	Athletics
30	Brunei	Brunei Darussalam	Mohamed Fakhri Ismail	Athletics
31	Bulgaria	Bulgária	Ivet Lalova-Collio	Athletics
32	Burkina Faso	Burkina Faso	Rachid Sidibé	Judo
33	Burundi	Burundi	Olivier Irabaruta	Athletics
34	Bhutan	Butão	Karma	Archery
35	Cape Verde	Cabo Verde	Maria Andrade	Taekwondo
36	Cameroon	Camarões	Wilfried Ntsengue	Boxing
37	Cambodia	Camboja	Sorn Seavmey	Taekwondo
38	Canada	Canadá	Rosannagh MacLennan	Gymnastics
39	Qatar	Catar	Sheikh Ali al-Thani Hamad	Equestrian
40	Kazakhstan	Cazaquistão	Ruslan Zhaparov	Taekwondo
41	Cayman Islands	Ilhas Cayman	Ronald Forbes	Athletics
42	Central African Republic	República Centroafricana	Chloe Sauvourel	Swimming
43	Chad	Chade	Bibiro Ali Taher	Athletics
44	Chile	Chile	Érika Olivera	Athletics
45	China	República Popular da China	Lei Sheng	Fencing
46	Cyprus	Chipre	Pavlos Kontides	Sailing
47	Colombia	Colômbia	Yuri Alvear	Judo
48	Comoros	Comores	Nazlati Mohamed Andhumdine	Swimming
49	Republic of the Congo	Congo	Franck Elemba	Athletics
50	Democratic Republic of the Congo	República Democrática do Congo	Rosa Keleku	Taekwondo
51	Cook Islands	Ilhas Cook	Ella Nicholas	Canoeing
52	South Korea	República da Coreia	Gu Bon-gil	Fencing
53	Ivory Coast	Costa do Marfim	Murielle Ahouré	Athletics
54	Costa Rica	Costa Rica	Nery Brenes	Athletics
55	Croatia	Croácia	Josip Pavić	Water polo
56	Cuba	Cuba	Mijaín López	Wrestling
57	Denmark	Dinamarca	Caroline Wozniacki	Tennis
58	Djibouti	Djibuti	Abdi Waiss Mouhyadin	Athletics
59	Dominica	Dominica	Yordanys Durañona	Athletics
60	Dominican Republic	República Dominicana	Luguelín Santos	Athletics
61	Egypt	Egito	Ahmed El-Ahmar	Handball
62	El Salvador	El Salvador	Lilian Castro	Shooting
63	United Arab Emirates	Emirados Árabes Unidos	Nada Al-Bedwawi	Swimming
64	Ecuador	Equador	Estefania García	Judo
65	Eritrea	Eritreia	Volunteer	
66	Slovakia	Eslováquia	Danka Barteková	Shooting
67	Slovenia	Eslovênia	Vasilij Žbogar	Sailing
68	Spain	Espanha	Rafael Nadal	Tennis
69	Federated States of Micronesia	Estados Federados da Micronésia	Jennifer Chieng	Boxing
70	United States	Estados Unidos da América	Michael Phelps	Swimming
71	Estonia	Estônia	Karl-Martin Rammo	Sailing
72	Ethiopia	Etiópia	Robel Kiros Habte	Swimming
73	Macedonia	Ex-República Iugoslava da Macedônia	Anastasija Bogdanovski	Swimming
74	Fiji	Fiji	Osea Kolinisau	Rugby sevens
75	Philippines	Filipinas	Ian Lariba	Table tennis
76	Finland	Finlândia	Tuuli Petäjä-Sirén	Sailing
77	France	França	Teddy Riner	Judo
78	Gabon	Gabão	Anthony Obame	Taekwondo
79	The Gambia	Gâmbia	Gina Bass	Athletics
80	Ghana	Gana	Flings Owusu-Agyapong	Athletics
81	Georgia	Geórgia	Avtandil Tchrikishvili	Judo
82	Great Britain	Grã-Bretanha	Andy Murray	Tennis
83	Grenada	Granada	Kirani James	Athletics
84	Guam	Guam	Benjamin Schulte	Swimming
85	Guatemala	Guatemala	Ana Sofía Gómez	Gymnastics
86	Guyana	Guiana	Hannibal Gaskin	Swimming
87	Guinea	Guiné	Mamadama Bangoura	Judo
88	Equatorial Guinea	Guiné Equatorial	Reïna-Flor Okori	Athletics
89	Guinea-Bissau	Guiné-Bissau	Augusto Midana	Wrestling
90	Haiti	Haiti	Asnage Castelly	Wrestling
91	Honduras	Honduras	Rolando Palacios	Athletics
92	Hong Kong	Hong Kong, China	Stephanie Au	Swimming
93	Hungary	Hungria	Áron Szilágyi	Fencing
94	Yemen	Iêmen	Zeyad Mater	Judo
95	India	Índia	Abhinav Bindra	Shooting
96	Indonesia	Indonésia	Maria Natalia Londa	Athletics
97	Iran	República Islâmica do Irã	Zahra Nemati	Archery
98	Iraq	Iraque	Waheed Abdul-Ridha	Boxing
99	Ireland	Irlanda	Paddy Barnes	Boxing
100	Iceland	Islândia	Þormóður Jónsson	Judo
101	Israel	Israel	Neta Rivkin	Gymnastics
102	Italy	Itália	Federica Pellegrini	Swimming
103	Jamaica	Jamaica	Shelly-Ann Fraser-Pryce	Athletics
104	Japan	Japão	Keisuke Ushiro	Athletics
105	Jordan	Jordânia	Hussein Ishaish	Boxing
106	Kiribati	Kiribati	David Katoatau	Weightlifting
107	Kosovo	Kosovo	Majlinda Kelmendi	Judo
108	Laos	República Popular Democrática do Laos	Xaysa Anousone	Athletics
109	Lesotho	Lesoto	Mosito Lehata	Athletics
110	Latvia	Letônia	Māris Štrombergs	Cycling
111	Lebanon	Líbano	Nacif Elias	Judo
112	Liberia	Libéria	Emmanuel Matadi	Athletics
113	Libya	Líbia	Mohamed Fuad Hrezi	Athletics
114	Liechtenstein	Liechtenstein	Julia Hassler	Swimming
115	Lithuania	Lituânia	Gintarė Scheidt	Sailing
116	Luxembourg	Luxemburgo	Gilles Müller	Tennis
117	Madagascar	Madagascar	Eliane Saholinirina	Athletics
118	Malaysia	Malásia	Lee Chong Wei	Badminton
119	Malawi	Maláui	Kefasi Chitsala	Athletics
120	Maldives	Maldivas	Aminath Shajan	Swimming
121	Mali	Mali	Djenebou Dante	Athletics
122	Malta	Malta	Andrew Chetcuti	Swimming
123	Marshall Islands	Ilhas Marshall	Mathlynn Sasser	Weightlifting
124	Morocco	Marrocos	Abdelkebir Ouaddar	Equestrian
125	Mauritius	Maurício	Kate Foo Kune	Badminton
126	Mauritania	Mauritânia	Jidou El Moctar	Athletics
127	Mexico	México	Daniela Campuzano	Cycling
128	Mozambique	Moçambique	Joaquim Lobo	Canoeing
129	Moldova	República da Moldova	Nicolae Ceban	Wrestling
130	Monaco	Mônaco	Brice Etès	Athletics
131	Mongolia	Mongólia	Temuulen Battulga	Judo
132	Montenegro	Montenegro	Bojana Popović	Handball
133	Myanmar	Myanmar	Yan Naing Soe	Judo
134	Namibia	Namíbia	Jonas Junias	Boxing
135	Nauru	Nauru	Elson Brechtefeld	Weightlifting
136	Nepal	Nepal	Phupu Lhamu Khatri	Judo
137	Nicaragua	Nicarágua	Rafael Lacayo	Shooting
138	Niger	Níger	Abdoul Razak Issoufou	Taekwondo
139	Nigeria	Nigéria	Olufunke Oshonaike	Table tennis
140	Norway	Noruega	Ole Kristian Bryhn	Shooting
141	New Zealand	Nova Zelândia	Peter Burling	Sailing
142	Oman	Omã	Hamed Said Al-Khatri	Shooting
143	Netherlands	Países Baixos	Jeroen Dubbeldam	Equestrian
144	Palau	Palau	Florian Skilang Temengil	Wrestling
145	Palestine	Palestina	Mayada Al-Sayad	Athletics
146	Panama	Panamá	Alonso Edward	Athletics
147	Papua New Guinea	Papua Nova Guiné	Ryan Pini	Swimming
148	Pakistan	Paquistão	Ghulam Mustafa Bashir	Shooting
149	Paraguay	Paraguai	Julieta Granada	Golf
150	Peru	Peru	Francisco Boza	Shooting
151	Poland	Polônia	Karol Bielecki	Handball
152	Puerto Rico	Porto Rico	Jaime Espinal	Wrestling
153	Portugal	Portugal	João Rodrigues	Sailing
154	Kenya	Quênia	Shehzana Anwar	Archery
155	Kyrgyzstan	Quirguistão	Erkin Adylbek Uulu	Boxing
156	North Korea	República Popular Democrática da Coreia	Choe Jon-wi	Weightlifting
157	Romania	Romênia	Cătălina Ponor	Gymnastics
158	Rwanda	Ruanda	Adrien Niyonshuti	Cycling
159	Russia	Federação da Rússia	Sergey Tetyukhin	Volleyball
160	Solomon Islands	Ilhas Salomão	Jenly Tegu Wini	Weightlifting
161	Samoa	Samoa	Mary Opeloge	Weightlifting
162	American Samoa	Samoa Americana	Tanumafili Jungblut	Weightlifting
163	San Marino	San Marino	Arianna Perilli	Shooting
164	Saint Lucia	Santa Lúcia	Levern Spencer	Athletics
165	Saint Kitts and Nevis	São Cristóvão e Névis	Antoine Adams	Athletics
166	São Tomé and Príncipe	São Tomé e Príncipe	Buly Triste	Canoeing
167	Saint Vincent and the Grenadines	São Vicente e Granadinas	Kineke Alexander	Athletics
168	Seychelles	Seicheles	Rodney Govinden	Sailing
169	Senegal	Senegal	Isabelle Sambou	Wrestling
170	Sierra Leone	Serra Leoa	Bunturabie Jalloh	Swimming
171	Serbia	Sérvia	Ivana Anđušić Maksimović	Shooting
172	Singapore	Singapura	Derek Wong Zi Liang	Badminton
173	Syria	República Árabe da Síria	Majd Eddin Ghazal	Athletics
174	Somalia	Somália	Mohamed Daud Mohamed	Athletics
175	Sri Lanka	Sri Lanka	Anuradha Cooray	Athletics
176	Swaziland	Suazilândia	Sibusiso Matsenjwa	Athletics
177	Sudan	Sudão	Abdalla Yousif	Athletics
178	South Sudan	Sudão do Sul	Guor Marial	Athletics
179	Sweden	Suécia	Therese Alshammar	Swimming
180	Switzerland	Suíça	Giulia Steingruber	Gymnastics
181	Suriname	Suriname	Soren Opti	Badminton
182	Tajikistan	Tadjiquistão	Dilshod Nazarov	Athletics
183	Thailand	Tailândia	Ratchanok Intanon	Badminton
184	Chinese Taipei	Taipé Chinesa	Isheau Wong	Equestrian
185	Tanzania	República Unida da Tanzânia	Andrew Thomas Mlugu	Judo
186	Czech Republic	República Tcheca	Lukáš Krpálek	Judo
187	Timor-Leste	República Democrática de Timor-Leste	Francelina Cabral	Cycling
188	Togo	Togo	Adzo Kpossi	Swimming
189	Tonga	Tonga	Pita Taufatofua	Taekwondo
190	Trinidad and Tobago	Trinidad e Tobago	Keshorn Walcott	Athletics
191	Tunisia	Tunísia	Oussama Mellouli	Swimming
192	Turkmenistan	Turcomenistão	Merdan Atayev	Swimming
193	Turkey	Turquia	Rıza Kayaalp	Wrestling
194	Tuvalu	Tuvalu	Etimoni Timuani	Athletics
195	Ukraine	Ucrânia	Mykola Milchev	Shooting
196	Uganda	Uganda	Joshua Tibatemwa	Swimming
197	Uruguay	Uruguai	Dolores Moreira	Sailing
198	Uzbekistan	Uzbequistão	Bakhodir Jalolov	Boxing
199	Vanuatu	Vanuatu	Yoshua Shing	Table tennis
200	Venezuela	Venezuela	Rubén Limardo	Fencing
201	Vietnam	Vietnã	Vũ Thành An	Fencing
202	Virgin Islands	Ilhas Virgens Americanas	Cy Thompson	Sailing
203	British Virgin Islands	Ilhas Virgens Britânicas	Ashley Kelly	Athletics
204	Zambia	Zâmbia	Mathews Punza	Judo
205	Zimbabwe	Zimbábue	Kirsty Coventry	Swimming
206	Refugee Olympic Team	Time Olímpico de Refugiados	Rose Lokonyen	Athletics
207	Brazil	Brasil	Yane Marques	Modern pentathlon
