= Timor-Leste at the 2017 Asian Winter Games =

- IOC code: TLS
- NOC: National Olympic Committee of Timor-Leste

in Sapporo and Obihiro February 19–26
- Competitors: 1 in 1 sport
- Flag bearer: Yohan Goutt Gonçalves
- Medals: Gold 0 Silver 0 Bronze 0 Total 0

Asian Winter Games appearances
- 2017; 2025; 2029

Timor-Leste competed at the 2017 Asian Winter Games in Sapporo and Obihiro, Japan from February 19 to 26. This marks the country's official debut at the Asian Winter Games. The country is scheduled to compete with one athlete in alpine skiing.

As the country's only athlete, alpine skier Yohan Goutt Gonçalves, was the country's flagbearer during the parade of nations at the opening ceremony.

== Competitors ==
The following table lists the Timor-Leste delegation per sport and gender.

Sport	Men	Women	Total
Alpine skiing	1	0	1
Total	1	0	1

== Alpine skiing ==
Timor-Leste's sole athlete will compete is 2014 Winter Olympics participant, Yohan Goutt Gonçalves.

Man

Athlete	Event	Run 1		Run 2		Total	
Athlete	Event	Time	Rank	Time	Rank	Time	Rank
Yohan Goutt Gonçalves	Giant slalom	1:16.59	16	1:17.83	15	2:34.42	14
Yohan Goutt Gonçalves	Slalom	56.92	11	1:00.82	11	1:57.74	11

== See also ==
- Timor-Leste at the 2014 Winter Olympics
