= Alpine skiing at the 2014 Winter Olympics – Qualification =

The following is about the qualification rules and the quota allocation for the alpine skiing events at the 2014 Winter Olympics.

== Qualification rules ==
=== Quotas ===
A maximum of 320 (later adjusted to 350 by the International Ski Federation) athletes are allowed to compete at the Games. A maximum of 22 athletes per nation will be allowed to compete with a maximum of 14 males or 14 females from a nation being permitted.

=== A standard ===
The A standard entails a competitor to be ranked within the top 500 in any event on the FIS Points list which will be made public after qualification ends on January 20, 2014. The qualification period begins in July 2012.

=== B standard ===
NOC's who do not have any athlete meeting the A standard can enter one competitor of each sex (known as the basic quota) in only the slalom and/or giant slalom events. These athletes must have only a maximum of 140 FIS points on the FIS Points list on January 20, 2014.

The Points List is calculated by taking the average of five event results for technical events (giant slalom and slalom) and three events for speed events (downhill, super g and super combined).

=== Allocation of quotas ===
Basic Quota

Every NOC will be assigned one male and one female quota spot meeting the B standard.

Top 500 on Points list

Every NOC with at least one male and/or female in the top 500 of any event will be allocated one additional male and/or female quota in addition to the basic quota.

Top 100 on Points list

Every NOC with at least one male and/or female in the top 100 of any event will be allocated one additional male and/or female quota in addition to the basic quota and top 500 quota.

Top 30 on Points list

Every NOC with at least one male and/or female in the top 30 of any event will be allocated one additional male and/or female quota in addition to the basic quota top 500 and 100 quota. If an athlete is ranked in the top 30 in more than one event a second additional quota for that sex will be given or if two different athletes are in the top 30.

Remaining quotas

The remaining quotas will be assigned using the Olympic Quota allocation list on January 20, 2014. The spots will be assigned until a maximum of 320 quotas are reached including the above. When a nation reaches its maximum, remaining athletes from that country will be skipped over. The list is a table of athletes in the top 500 in their three best events (including both male and female athletes).

An athlete can be counted only once for the above five criteria. For example, if a country has only one athlete meeting all five criteria then only one quota will be given (not 4).

=== Qualification eligibility ===
The Olympic Points List	Downhill	Super G	Super Combined	Slalom	Giant Slalom
Ranked <=500 in DH, SG, SC	<80 points	<80 points	<80 points	140 points	140 points
Ranked <=500 in GS, SL		<80 points	<80 points	140 points	140 points
B Qualification				140 points	140 points

== Quota allocation ==
Final allocation as of January 24, 2014. NOCs had to confirm to FIS the use of quota places on January 22. The re-allocation process was scheduled to end January 24. NOCs could not decline quota places after the entry deadline of January 27.

=== Current summary ===
Nations	Men	Women	Additional	Athletes
Albania	1	1		2
Andorra	2	2		4
Argentina	3	3		6
Armenia	1			1
Australia	2	3		5
Austria	5	5	12	22
Azerbaijan	1	1		2
Belarus	1	1		2
Bosnia and Herzegovina	2	1		3
Brazil	1	1		2
Bulgaria	3	1		4
Canada	5	5	5	15
Cayman Islands	1			1
Chile	2	1		3
China	1	1		2
Croatia	5	3		8
Cyprus	1	1		2
Czech Republic	3	5		8
Denmark	1			1
Estonia	1	1		2
Finland	2	2		4
France	5	5	9	19
Georgia	2	1		3
Germany	3	4		7
Great Britain	1	1		2
Greece	2	1		3
Hungary	1	2		3
Iceland	2	2		4
Independent Olympic Athletes	1			1
Iran	2	1		3
Ireland	1	1		2
Israel	1	1		2
Italy	5	5	9	19
Japan	1	1		2
Kazakhstan	3	1		4
Kyrgyzstan	1			1
Latvia	3	2		5
Lebanon	1	1		2
Liechtenstein	1	2		3
Lithuania	1	1		2
Macedonia	1			1
Malta		1		1
Mexico	1			1
Moldova	2			2
Monaco	2	1		3
Montenegro	1	1		2
Morocco	1	1		2
New Zealand	1			1
Norway	5	5		10
Pakistan	1			1
Peru	1	1		2
Poland	3	3		6
Portugal	1	1		2
Romania	2	1		3
Russia	5	4		9
San Marino	1	1		2
Serbia	1	1		2
Slovakia	3	5		8
Slovenia	4	4		8
South Korea	3	2		5
Spain	4	1		5
Sweden	5	5	2	12
Switzerland	5	5	11	21
Tajikistan	1			1
Thailand	1	1		2
Timor-Leste	1			1
Togo		1		1
Turkey	1	1		2
Ukraine	1	1		2
United States	5	5	10	20
Uzbekistan	1	1		2
Venezuela	1			1
Virgin Islands		1		1
Zimbabwe	1			1
Total: 74 NOCs	158	137	58	350

=== Men ===
Criteria	Athletes per NOC	Total Athletes	Qualified
Top 100, 500, Basic quota + 2 spots in top 30	5	60	Austria; Canada; Croatia; ~~Finland~~; France; Germany; Italy; Japan; Norway; Russia; Sweden; Switzerland; United States
Top 100, 500, Basic quota + 1 spot in top 30	4	12	Great Britain; Slovakia; Slovenia
Top 100, 500 + Basic quota	3	24	Argentina; ~~Belgium~~; Bulgaria; Czech Republic; Kazakhstan; Latvia; ~~Netherlands~~; Poland; South Korea; Spain
Top 500 + Basic quota	2	28	Andorra; Australia; Bosnia and Herzegovina; Chile; Georgia; Greece; Iceland; Iran; Liechtenstein; Moldova; Monaco; New Zealand; Romania
Basic quota	1	35	Albania; Armenia; Azerbaijan; Belarus; Brazil; Cayman Islands; China; Cyprus; Denmark; Estonia; Hungary; Independent Olympic Athletes; Ireland; Israel; Kyrgyzstan; Lebanon; Lithuania; ~~Luxembourg~~; Macedonia; Mexico; Montenegro; Morocco; Pakistan; Peru; Portugal; San Marino; Serbia; ~~South Africa~~; Tajikistan; Thailand; Timor-Leste; Turkey; Ukraine; Uzbekistan; Venezuela; Zimbabwe
TOTAL		159	

=== Women ===
Criteria	Athletes per NOC	Total Athletes	Qualified
Top 100, 500, Basic quota + 2 spots in top 30	5	60	Austria; Canada; Czech Republic; France; Germany; Italy; Liechtenstein; Norway; Slovakia; Sweden; Switzerland; United States
Top 100, 500, Basic quota + 1 spot in top 30	4	16	~~Finland~~; Russia; Slovenia; Spain
Top 100, 500 + Basic quota	3	18	~~Andorra~~; Argentina; Australia; ~~Belgium~~; Croatia; Great Britain; Japan; Poland
Top 500 + Basic quota	2	12	~~Denmark~~; Finland; Hungary; Iceland; Latvia; ~~Netherlands~~; New Zealand; South Korea
Basic quota	1	34	Albania; Andorra; Azerbaijan; Belarus; Bosnia and Herzegovina; Brazil; Bulgaria; Chile; China; Cyprus; Estonia; Georgia; Greece; Iran; Ireland; Israel; Kazakhstan; Lebanon; Lithuania; Malta; Monaco; Montenegro; Morocco; Peru; Portugal; ~~Puerto Rico~~; Romania; San Marino; Serbia; Thailand; Togo; Turkey; Ukraine; Uzbekistan; Virgin Islands
TOTAL		137	

=== Additional quotas ===
Athletes per NOC	Total	Qualified
12	12	Austria
11	11	Switzerland
10	10	United States
9	18	France; Italy
5	5	Canada
2	2	Sweden
TOTAL	58	

=== Next eligible NOC per event ===
If a country rejects a quota spot then additional quotas become available. Countries in bold indicate that country received a rejected quota spot. Here are the top 45 eligible countries. Note: a country can be eligible for more than one quota spot in the reallocation process. Countries in bold have gotten a reallocation of a quota spot in the respective event, a country with a strike means they rejected that quota spot.

Country	**United States**; **United States**; **United States**; **Sweden**; **France**; **United States**; **United States**; **United States**; **Switzerland**; **France**; **Switzerland**; **Austria**; **Switzerland**; **Austria**; **Norway**; **Switzerland**; ~~Germany~~; ~~Norway~~; **Switzerland**; **France**; **United States**; ~~Norway~~; **Italy**; **Canada**; **Canada**; **Canada**; **Switzerland**; **Italy**; **Italy**; ~~Norway~~; ~~Switzerland~~; ~~Norway~~; **Italy**; **France**; **Italy**; ~~Italy~~; **France**; ~~Canada~~; ~~Italy~~; **United States**; **Sweden**; Canada; France; Italy; France
