= José Ernani Palalia =

Mexican long-distance runner (born 1972)

Personal information
- Nationality: Mexican
- Born: 12 March 1972 (age 54)

Sport
- Sport: Long-distance running
- Event: Marathon

José Ernani Palalia (born 12 March 1972) is a Mexican long-distance runner. He competed in the men's marathon at the 2004 Summer Olympics.
