= Imelda Ximenes Belo =

Timorese swimmer (born 1998)

Imelda Felicyta Ximenes Belo
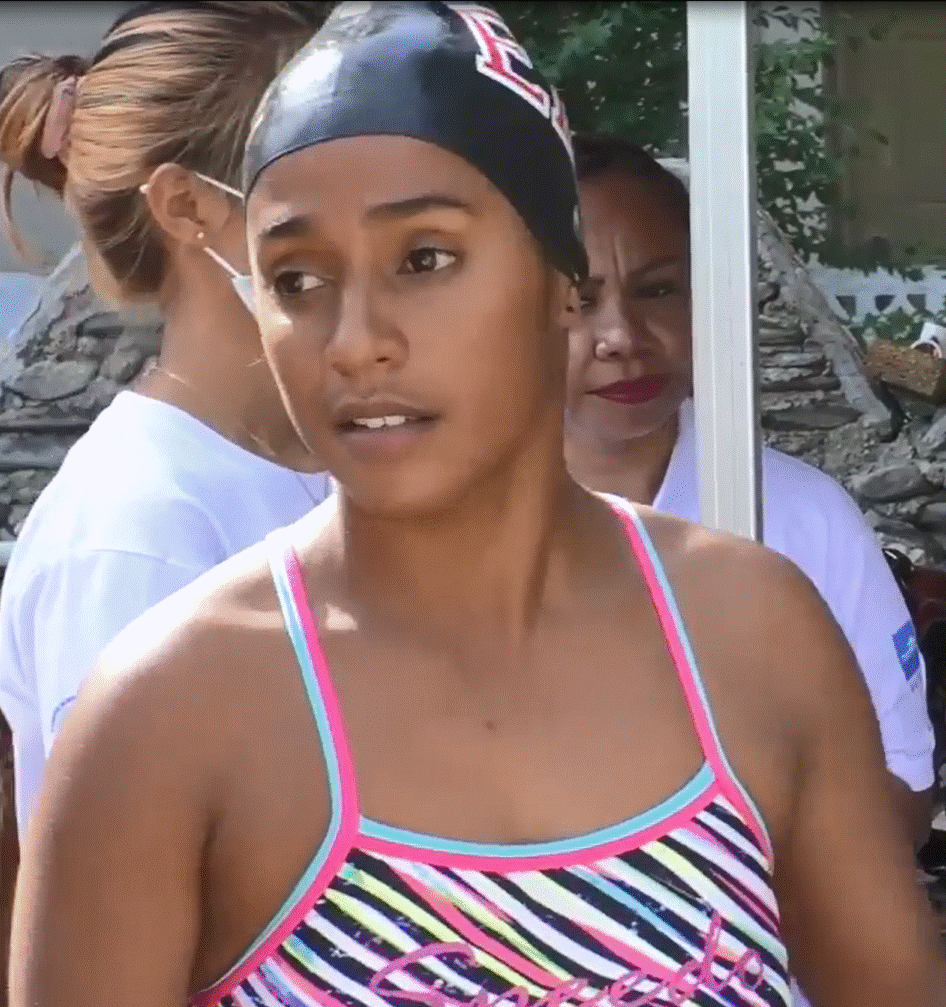

Personal information
- Nationality: Timorese
- Born: 24 October 1998 (age 27)

Sport
- Country: East Timor
- Sport: Swimming
- Event: Women's 50m freestyle

Imelda Felicyta Ximenes Belo (born 24 October 1998) is a Timorese swimmer in freestyle and butterfly races. She competed in the women's 50 metre freestyle event at the 2020 Summer Olympics, representing East Timor.

== Career ==
Ximenes began swimming at the age of 14 in her hometown of Baucau, when a group from FINA came to teach local children in a hotel pool. She has competed in Swimming World Championships in 2017, 2018, and 2019. In 2018 she became the first swimmer from Timor–Leste to compete at the Asian Games. She has yet to advance past the heats in international competition. During the COVID-19 pandemic, pools were closed and Ximenes instead swam in the sea until flooding outbreaks prevented this.

Olympic Games
Preceded by Francelina Cabral	Flagbearer for Timor-Leste (with Felisberto de Deus); Tokyo 2020	Succeeded by Incumbent
