= Athletics at the 2004 Summer Olympics – Men's marathon =

Men's marathon at the Games of the XXVIII Olympiad
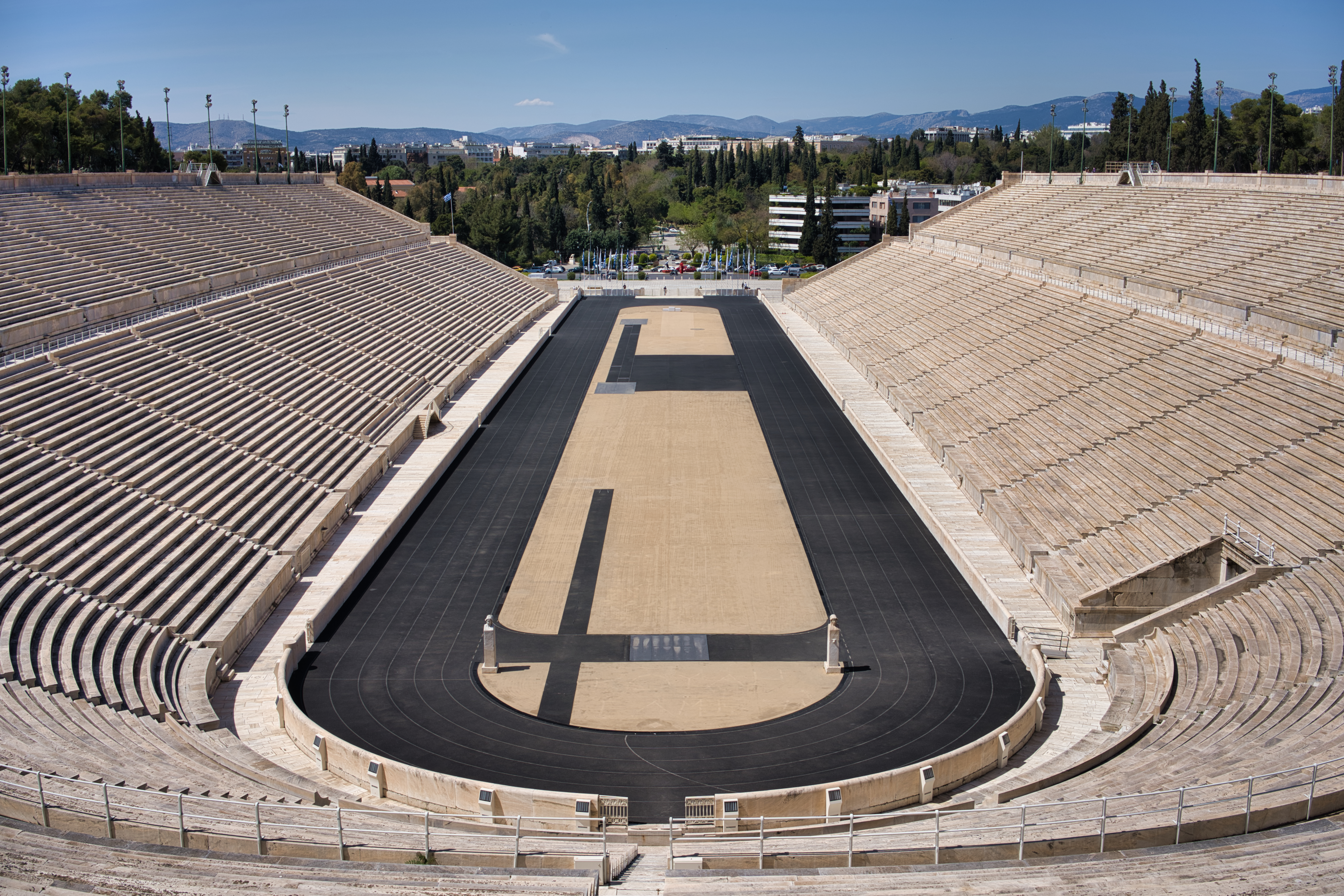
- Panathenaic Stadium (2014)
- Venue: Marathon to Athens, Greece
- Date: 29 August
- Competitors: 101 from 59 nations
- Winning time: 2:10:55

Medalists
1st place, gold medalist(s)		Stefano Baldini; Italy
2nd place, silver medalist(s)		Meb Keflezighi; United States
3rd place, bronze medalist(s)		Vanderlei de Lima; Brazil

Official Highlights

Official Video

The Men's marathon at the 2004 Summer Olympics took place on August 29 in the streets of Athens, Greece where one hundred and one athletes from 59 nations competed. The event was won by Stefano Baldini of Italy, the nation's first victory in the event since 1988 and second overall. The United States reached the podium in the event for the first time since 1976 with Meb Keflezighi's silver. Vanderlei de Lima took bronze, Brazil's first-ever medal in the men's marathon.

As with the previous Games, the marathon also marked the end of the 2004 Summer Olympics and the medal ceremony took place during the closing ceremony at the Olympic Stadium.

The event was mired in controversy after the organisers rejected an appeal for Vanderlei de Lima to be awarded gold. He was leading the race when he was tackled by a spectator, relegating him to third.

== Summary ==
The 42-km (26-mile) journey began in the actual town of Marathon. The top contenders all found themselves in a large leading group that held a modest pace through the half marathon. A few tried to surge ahead but the most successful was Vanderlei de Lima's attack at 20k. Past 25k, Stefano Baldini raised the tempo taking seven others with him. Finally, the chase group had been whittled down to three: Stefano Baldini, Paul Tergat, and Mebrahtom Keflezighi. After 35k was passed, Tergat (the world record holder) cracked, leaving two runners to chase behind. Baldini then closed the gap to De Lima after the latter was attacked by a spectator while dropping Keflezighi. Baldini moved into the lead and took it home for the gold medal in 2:10:55. Keflezighi caught the fading De Lima as well to take the silver in 2:11:29. Finishing at 2:12:11, De Lima was able to hold off Jon Brown, beating him by 15 seconds for the bronze.

== Incident ==
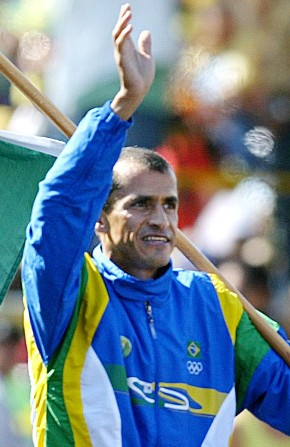
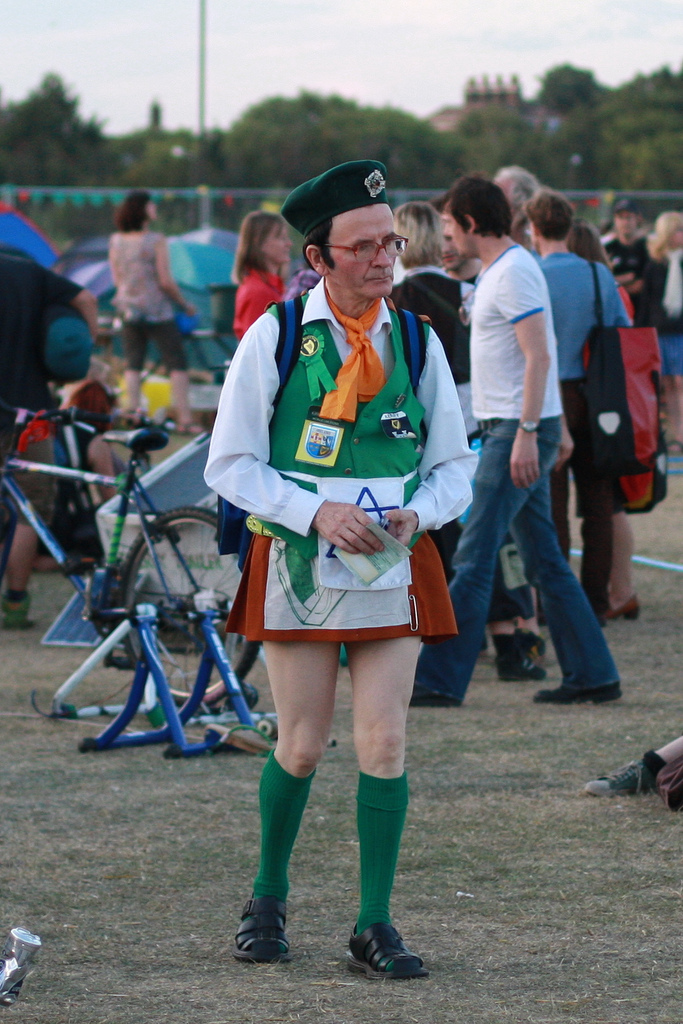
Vanderlei de Lima (left) and Neil Horan

The event was marked by an incident in which Neil Horan, an Irish priest, grappled Vanderlei de Lima of Brazil while de Lima was leading the event with around 7 kilometers remaining and dragged him to the crowd. Greek spectator Polyvios Kossivas helped de Lima free from Horan's grasp and back into his running. De Lima lost about 10 seconds of time because of the interruption, and finished third in the event with a time of 2:12:11, winning the bronze medal. De Lima received the rarely awarded Pierre de Coubertin Medal for sportsmanship in addition to his bronze.

Despite the fact that the incident had seriously hindered his chances of winning the gold or silver medal, he did not complain and graciously acknowledged the crowd's cheers in the home straight. The protester had a sign on his back that read "The Grand Prix Priest. Israel Fulfilment of Prophecy Says The Bible. The Second Coming is Near."

The phrase "Grand Prix Priest" refers to Horan's previous protest, in which he ran onto the track at the Silverstone Circuit during the 2003 British Grand Prix, intentionally running directly into the path of oncoming cars.

== Background ==
This was the 25th appearance of the event, which is one of 12 athletics events to have been held at every Summer Olympics. Returning runners from the 2000 marathon included silver medalist Erick Wainaina of Kenya and fourth-place finisher Jon Brown of Great Britain. The reigning world champion was Jaouad Gharib of Morocco. There was "no definite favorite" in the field.

Belarus, the Czech Republic, and Saint Lucia each made their first appearance in Olympic men's marathons; East Timor made its first formal appearance, though it had had one Independent Olympic Athlete from East Timor in 2000. The United States made its 24th appearance, most of any nation, having missed only the boycotted 1980 Games.

== Qualification ==
The qualification period for athletics was 1 January 2003 to 9 August 2004. For the men's marathon, each National Olympic Committee was permitted to enter up to three athletes that had run the race in 2:15:00 or faster during the qualification period. The maximum number of athletes per nation had been set at 3 since the 1930 Olympic Congress. If an NOC had no athletes that qualified under that standard, one athlete that had run the race in 2:18:00 or faster could be entered.

== Competition format and course ==
As all Olympic marathons, the competition was a single race. The marathon distance of 26 miles, 385 yards was run over a point-to-point route through the streets of Athens. These streets were recently painted for the event, which provided an excellent road surface for the athletes. Drawing upon the ancient origins of the race, the marathon began in Marathon, Greece, and eventually ended at Panathinaiko Stadium, the venue previously used for the 1896 Athens Olympics.

== Records ==
Prior to the competition, the existing world and Olympic records were as follows.

World record	Paul Tergat (KEN)	2:04:55	Berlin, Germany	28 September 2003
Olympic record	Carlos Lopes (POR)	2:09:21	Los Angeles, United States	12 August 1984

No new records were set during the competition.

== Schedule ==
The day was "the hottest day ever for an Olympic marathon", just above 30 °C (86 °F).

All times are Greece Standard Time (UTC+2)

Date	Time	Round
Sunday, 29 August 2004	18:00	Final

== Results ==
Eighty-one runners finished; 20 did not.

Rank	Athlete	Nation	Time	Notes
1st place, gold medalist(s)	Stefano Baldini	Italy	2:10:55	
2nd place, silver medalist(s)	Meb Keflezighi	United States	2:11:29	SB
3rd place, bronze medalist(s)	Vanderlei de Lima	Brazil	2:12:11	
4	Jon Brown	Great Britain	2:12:26	SB
5	Shigeru Aburaya	Japan	2:13:11	
6	Toshinari Suwa	Japan	2:13:24	
7	Erick Wainaina	Kenya	2:13:30	
8	Alberto Chaíça	Portugal	2:14:17	
9	Alberico di Cecco	Italy	2:14:34	
10	Paul Tergat	Kenya	2:14:45	
11	Jaouad Gharib	Morocco	2:15:12	
12	Alan Culpepper	United States	2:15:26	
13	Leonid Shvetsov	Russia	2:15:28	
14	Lee Bong-ju	South Korea	2:15:33	
15	Ambesse Tolosa	Ethiopia	2:15:39	
16	Gert Thys	South Africa	2:16:08	
17	Ji Young-joon	South Korea	2:16:14	
18	Antoni Peña	Spain	2:16:38	
19	Grigoriy Andreyev	Russia	2:16:55	
20	Haile Satayin	Israel	2:17:25	
21	Jonathan Wyatt	New Zealand	2:17:45	
22	Janne Holmen	Finland	2:17:50	
23	Dan Robinson	Great Britain	2:17:53	
24	Nikolaos Polias	Greece	2:17:56	
25	Ndabili Bashingili	Botswana	2:18:09	
26	Pavel Loskutov	Estonia	2:18:09	
27	José Rios	Spain	2:18:40	
28	Lee Troop	Australia	2:18:46	
29	Michael Buchleitner	Austria	2:19:19	
30	Anuradha Cooray	Sri Lanka	2:19:24	
31	Li Zhuhong	China	2:19:26	
32	Joachim Nshimirimana	Burundi	2:19:31	
33	Dale Warrender	New Zealand	2:19:42	
34	Waldemar Glinka	Poland	2:19:43	
35	Jong Myong-chol	North Korea	2:19:47	
36	El-Hassan Lahssini	France	2:19:50	
37	Michał Bartoszak	Poland	2:20:20	
38	Ahmed Jumaa Jaber	Qatar	2:20:27	
39	Ali Mabrouk El Zaidi	Libya	2:20:31	
40	Samson Ramadhani	Tanzania	2:20:38	
41	Lee Myong-seung	South Korea	2:21:01	
42	Tomoaki Kunichika	Japan	2:21:13	
43	José Alirio Carrasco	Colombia	2:21:14	
44	Ernest Ndjissipou	Central African Republic	2:21:23	
45	Nicholas Harrison	Australia	2:21:42	
46	Tereje Wodajo	Ethiopia	2:21:53	
47	Aguelmis Rojas	Cuba	2:21:59	
48	Abel Chimukoko	Zimbabwe	2:22:09	
49	Saïd Belhout	Algeria	2:22:32	
50	Matthew O'Dowd	Great Britain	2:22:37	
51	Juan Carlos Cardona	Colombia	2:22:49	
52	Daniele Caimmi	Italy	2:23:07	
53	João N'Tyamba	Angola	2:23:26	
54	Roman Kejžar	Slovenia	2:23:34	
55	Procopio Franco	Mexico	2:23:34	
56	Wu Wen-chien	Chinese Taipei	2:23:54	
57	Antoni Bernadó	Andorra	2:23:55	
58	Julio Rey	Spain	2:24:54	
59	Asaf Bimro	Israel	2:25:20	
60	Sisay Bezabeh	Australia	2:25:26	
61	Silvio Guerra	Ecuador	2:25:29	
62	Mathias Ntawulikura	Rwanda	2:26:05	
63	Róbert Štefko	Czech Republic	2:27:12	
64	José Amado García	Guatemala	2:27:13	
65	Dan Browne	United States	2:27:17	
66	Han Gang	China	2:27:31	
67	Eduardo Buenavista	Philippines	2:28:18	
68	Driss El Himer	France	2:29:07	
69	Andrés Espinosa	Mexico	2:29:43	
70	Mpesela Ntlot Soeu	Lesotho	2:30:19	
71	Franklin Tenorio	Ecuador	2:31:12	
72	José Ernani Palalia	Mexico	2:31:41	
73	Dmitriy Burmakin	Russia	2:31:51	
74	Mindaugas Pukštas	Lithuania	2:33:02	
75	Bat-Ochiryn Ser-Od	Mongolia	2:33:24	
76	Zhu Ronghua	China	2:34:02	
77	Alfredo Arevalo	Guatemala	2:34:02	
78	António Zeferino	Cape Verde	2:36:22	
79	Valery Pisarev	Kyrgyzstan	2:40:10	
80	Zepherinus Joseph	Saint Lucia	2:44:19	
81	Marcel Matanin	Slovakia	2:50:26	
—	Hendrick Ramaala	South Africa	DNF	After 35 km
—	Zebedayo Bayo	Tanzania	DNF	After 30 km
—	Hailu Negussie	Ethiopia	DNF	After 30 km
—	Viktor Röthlin	Switzerland	DNF	After 30 km
—	Al Mustafa Riyadh	Bahrain	DNF	After 25 km
—	Rômulo Wagner	Brazil	DNF	After 25 km
—	Ian Syster	South Africa	DNF	After 25 km
—	Zsolt Bácskai	Hungary	DNF	After 25 km
—	Azat Rakipov	Belarus	DNF	After half
—	Dmytro Baranovskyy	Ukraine	DNF	After half
—	Rachid Ghanmouni	Morocco	DNF	After half
—	Rachid Ziar	Algeria	DNF	After half
—	Mustapha Bennacer	Algeria	DNF	After half
—	André Luiz Ramos	Brazil	DNF	After half
—	Luis Fonseca	Venezuela	DNF	After half
—	Khalid El-Boumlili	Morocco	DNF	After half
—	John Nada Saya	Tanzania	DNF	After 20 km
—	Gil da Cruz Trindade	Timor-Leste	DNF	After 20 km
—	Jussi Utriainen	Finland	DNF	After 10 km
—	Jean-Paul Gahimbaré	Burundi	DNF	After 10 km
—	Luc Krotwaar	Netherlands	DNS	
