= Khalid El-Boumlili =

Moroccan long-distance runner

Personal information
- Nationality: Moroccan
- Born: 10 April 1978 (age 48)

Sport
- Sport: Long-distance running
- Event: Marathon

Khalid El-Boumlili (born 10 April 1978) is a Moroccan long-distance runner. He competed in the men's marathon at the 2004 Summer Olympics.
