= Zhu Ronghua =

Chinese long-distance runner

Personal information
- Nationality: Chinese
- Born: 9 May 1974 (age 52)

Sport
- Sport: Long-distance running
- Event: Marathon

Zhu Ronghua (born 9 May 1974) is a Chinese long-distance runner. He competed in the men's marathon at the 2004 Summer Olympics.
