= Mustapha Bennacer =

Algerian runner (born 1977)

Personal information
- Nationality: Algerian
- Born: 27 July 1977 (age 48)

Sport
- Sport: Long-distance running
- Event: Marathon

Mustapha Bennacer (born 27 July 1977) is an Algerian long-distance runner. He competed in the men's marathon at the 2004 Summer Olympics.
