= Mariana Diaz Ximenez =

East Timorese long-distance runner

Personal information
- Born: 13 December 1983 (age 42)

Sport
- Sport: Long-distance running
- Event: Marathon

Mariana Diaz Ximenez (born December 13, 1983, in Baucau) is an East Timorese athlete who specialises in the marathon.

A resident of Dili, she fled her home in 1999 after East Timor's declaration of independence from Indonesia, and the ensuing violence. When she returned to the capital, she "saw the Dili harbor filled with the bloated bodies of the dead".

In 2001, Diaz won a gold medal in the marathon at the Arafura Games in Australia. In 2002, she represented the newly independent country at the Asian Games in Busan, where she ran the marathon.

Having attempted unsuccessfully to qualify for the 2004 Summer Olympics in Athens, Diaz was one of the two representatives of Timor-Leste at the 2008 Olympic Games in Beijing. However, she did not finish the race.
