= Calisto da Costa =

East Timorese athlete

Personal information
- Born: 6 February 1979 (age 47) Dili, Dili, Timor Timur, Indonesia (now Timor Leste)
- Height: 1.62 m (5 ft 4 in)
- Weight: 52 kg (115 lb)

Sport
- Country: East Timor
- Event: Marathon

Achievements and titles
- Olympic finals: 2000
- Personal bests: Marathon;: 2:33.11

Calisto da Costa (born 6 February 1979) is an East Timorese athlete. He was one of the first athletes to represent East Timor at the Olympic Games, when he competed in the men's marathon at the 2000 Summer Olympics in Sydney, though he technically competed as an individual athlete because East Timor was newly independent and had not yet been formally recognized by the International Olympic Committee. Costa was one of the ten East Timorese athletes who received training in Darwin, Northern Territory, prior to his participation in the Sydney Olympic Games. He finished in 71st place at 2:33:11.

Costa also competed in the Dili-Marathon where he finished 3rd place at 2:34:52, and in the 2011 New York City Marathon where he finished 276th place at 2:46:04.
