= Timor-Leste at the 2004 Summer Olympics =

- Flag of Timor-Leste
- IOC code: TLS
- NOC: National Olympic Committee of Timor-Leste

in Athens, Greece 13–29 August 2004
- Competitors: 2 in 1 sport
- Flag bearer: Agueda Amaral
- Medals: Gold 0 Silver 0 Bronze 0 Total 0

Summer Olympics appearances (overview)
- 2004; 2008; 2012; 2016; 2020; 2024; 2028

Other related appearances
- Indonesia (1952–1996); Individual Olympic Athletes (2000)

Timor-Leste (East Timor) competed at the 2004 Summer Olympics in Athens, Greece, which was held from 13 to 29 August. The nation's appearance at the 2004 Athens Games marked its official debut in any Olympic event and also the Summer Olympics.

Two track and field athletes, Gil da Cruz Trindade and Agueda Amaral, were selected to represent the nation via wildcards, as the nation had no athletes that met either the "A" or "B" qualifying standards in their respective events, the Men's and Women's marathons. At 32 years and 88 days, Amaral became the oldest athlete to represent the nation at the Summer Games, which still stands today. She was also selected as the nation's first flag bearer for the opening ceremony.

Ultimately, neither athlete won a medal in their events, with Trindade not even finishing his marathon. This therefore meant that Timor-Leste won no medals in the Athens Games.

== Background ==
Although this was the official Summer Olympics debut for Timor-Leste, Timorese athletes had competed as individual Olympic athletes in the 2000 Summer Olympics in Sydney, Australia. Because the athletes did not win a medal at the previous Olympics, no athlete from the nation had won a medal prior to the 2004 Athens Games.

The National Olympic Committee of Timor-Leste (NOC) selected two athletes via wildcards. Usually, a NOC would be able to enter up to three qualified athletes in each individual event as long as each athlete met the "A" standard, or one athlete per event if they met the "B" standard.

== Athletics ==
=== Men's ===
Athlete	Event	Final	
Athlete	Event	Result	Rank
Gil da Cruz Trindade	Marathon	DNF	

=== Women's ===
Athlete	Event	Final	
Athlete	Event	Result	Rank
Aguida Amaral	Marathon	3:18:25	65
