= Timor-Leste at the Olympics =

- Flag of Timor-Leste
- IOC code: TLS
- NOC: National Olympic Committee of Timor-Leste
- Medals: Gold 0 Silver 0 Bronze 0 Total 0

Summer appearances
- 2004; 2008; 2012; 2016; 2020; 2024; 2028

Winter appearances
- 2014; 2018; 2022; 2026

Other related appearances
- Indonesia (1952–1996); Individual Olympic Athletes (2000)

Timor-Leste gained its independence in 2002 and has participated in every Summer Olympics since then, under the auspices of its National Olympic Committee. It has also sent a single skier, Yohan Goutt Gonçalves, to the 2014, 2018 and 2022 Winter Olympics. Timor-Leste has yet to win its first Olympic medal, summer or winter.

== History ==
The island of Timor, which Timor-Leste shares with Indonesia, was a Portuguese colony for centuries (barring Japanese occupation in World War II). Then Portugal underwent a military coup d'état in April 1974 and decided to divest itself of most of its colonies. Fretilin (the Revolutionary Front for an Independent East Timor; Portuguese: Frente Revolucionária do Timor-Leste Independente) declared the independence of East Timor, but Indonesia invaded, defeated Falintil (Fretilin's military arm) and occupied the region from 1975 to 1999.

When Indonesia finally relinquished control after a referendum in East Timor which overwhelmingly favored independence, the United Nations Transitional Administration in East Timor temporarily assumed the duties of civil administration from October 1999 to 20 May 2002, at which time Timor-Leste was officially recognized as an independent state.

== Participation in the Olympics ==
In the United Nations-governed interim, four Timorese athletes were allowed to compete in the 2000 Summer Olympics as Independent Olympians.

Timor-Leste's National Olympic Committee was recognized by the International Olympic Committee in 2003. The nation made its debut in the 2004 Summer Olympics and has participated in every Summer Olympics since then.

On 29 December 2013, French-born Yohan Goutt Gonçalves managed to qualify for the 2014 Winter Olympics as an alpine slalom skier. He is the sole Winter Games competitor to date from Timor-Leste, and has also competed in the 2018 and 2022 Winter Olympics.

No Timorese athlete has won an Olympic medal.

== Medal tables ==
=== Medals by Summer Games ===
Games	Athletes	Gold	Silver	Bronze	Total	Rank
2000 Sydney	competed as Individual Olympic Athletes					
2004 Athens	2	0	0	0	0	–
2008 Beijing	2	0	0	0	0	–
2012 London	2	0	0	0	0	–
2016 Rio de Janeiro	3	0	0	0	0	–
2020 Tokyo	3	0	0	0	0	–
2024 Paris	4	0	0	0	0	–
2028 Los Angeles	future event					
2032 Brisbane	future event					
Total		0	0	0	0	–

=== Medals by Winter Games ===
Games	Athletes	Gold	Silver	Bronze	Total	Rank
2014 Sochi	1	0	0	0	0	–
2018 Pyeongchang	1	0	0	0	0	–
2022 Beijing	1	0	0	0	0	–
2026 Milano Cortina	did not participate					
2030 French Alps	future event					
2034 Utah	future event					
Total		0	0	0	0	–

== See also ==
- List of flag bearers for Timor-Leste at the Olympics
- Timor-Leste at the Paralympics
- Tropical nations at the Winter Olympics
