= Yohan Goutt Gonçalves =

East Timorese alpine skier (born 1994)

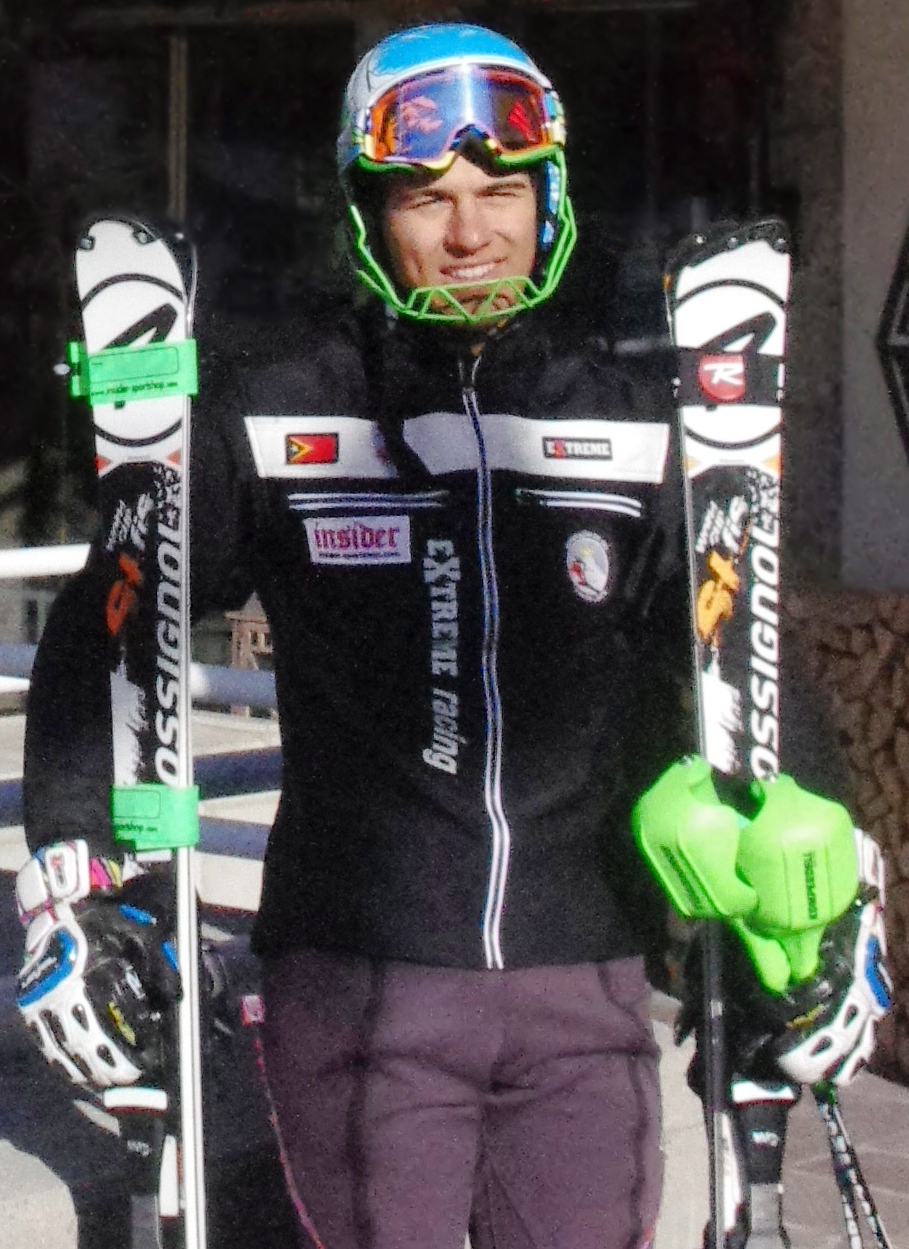

Personal information
- Born: 20 December 1994 (age 31) Suresnes, France

Skiing career
- Sport: Alpine skiing ♂
- Disciplines: Giant slalom, slalom

Olympics
- Teams: 3 – (2014, 2018, 2022)
Medal record
Alpine skiing
Representing Timor-Leste

Yohan Carlos Goutt Gonçalves (born 20 December 1994) is an East Timorese alpine skier. Born in France, Goutt Gonçalves qualified to compete for Timor-Leste at the 2014 Winter Olympics in Sochi, Russia. By doing so, he became the first athlete ever to qualify from the country at the Winter Olympics. He also competed for East Timor at the 2018 Winter Olympics in PyeongChang.

Goutt Gonçalves is the son of a French father, and his mother is from Timor-Leste, allowing him to compete for the latter country. His father's mother was Estonian Eva Goutt (maiden name Liiv), who is related to Estonian poet Juhan Liiv.

On 29 December 2013, in a race in Serbia, Goutt Gonçalves managed to lower his point total to below 140 and officially qualify for the 2014 Winter Olympics.

Goutt Gonçalves decided against participating at the 2017 FIS Alpine World Ski Championships to participate at the 2017 Asian Winter Games, becoming the first athlete to represent Timor-Leste in the continental competition.

== See also ==
- Timor-Leste at the 2014 Winter Olympics
- Timor-Leste at the 2017 Asian Winter Games
- Timor-Leste at the 2018 Winter Olympics
- Timor-Leste at the 2022 Winter Olympics
