= Francelina Cabral =

East Timorese cyclist

Francelina Cabral (born 23 March 1985 in Lospalos, Lautém) is an East Timorese cross-country cyclist. She competed at the 2016 Summer Olympics in the women's cross-country race, the first Olympic cyclist of any type to compete for East Timor, but she was lapped and did not finish the race. She was the flag bearer for Timor-Leste at the Parade of Nations.
