= Felisberto de Deus =

Timorese athlete (born 1999)

Personal information
- Born: 6 July 1999 (age 27) Katrai Kraik, East Timor, Indonesia
- Height: 1.75 m (5 ft 9 in)
- Weight: 69 kg (152 lb)

Sport
- Country: East Timor
- Sport: Athletics
- Events: Middle-distance running, Long-distance running

Achievements and titles
- Personal bests: 1500m: 3:51.03 NR (2021); 5000m: 14:35.57 NR (2019); 10,000m: 30:52.52 NR (2019); 3000m SC: 9:14.07 NR (2018); Road; Half Marathon: 1:08:35 (2018)
Medal record
Men's athletics
Representing Timor-Leste
Southeast Asian Games
Silver medal – second place	2021 Hanoi	5000 metres
Silver medal – second place	2021 Hanoi	10000 metres
- Updated on 16 May 2022

Felisberto de Deus (born 6 July 1999) is a middle- and long-distance runner from Timor Leste. He represented his country at the 2020 Olympic Games and is the national record holder at distances from 1500 metres to 10,000 metres, as well as the 3000 metres steeplechase.

== Biography ==
Born in Katrai Kraik, Ermera, and from a rural area an hour outside Dili, he started training in running in 2015 and used the mountains of his home country. In 2016, he competed in the ASEAN Youth Championship in Thailand. He set a national record in the 3000 metres steeplechase of 9:14.07 at the 2018 Asian Games in Jakarta.

He was selected to compete in the men's 1500 metres at the delayed 2020 Summer Games held in 2021, and set a national record time of 3:51.03 without advancing from his heat. He was given the honour of being the flag bearer for his nation in the opening ceremony for the Games held in Tokyo, Japan.

He won silver medals over both 5000 metres and 10,000 metres at the delayed 2021 SEA Games, held in Hanoi, Vietnam, in May 2022. The medals were the first ever won in athletics for his country at the Games.

He placed sixth and fifth in the 5000m and 10,000m respectively at the 2023 SEA Games in Hanoi, Vietnam. He won the bronze medal over 5000 metres at the 2024 ASEAN University Games in Indonesia.

In 2025, he failed to finish the 42km race at the Dili International Marathon (DIM). The following year, he won the 21km race at DIM in 1:10hr.

== Personal life ==
He studied English at the National University of Timor-Leste.
