= Individual Paralympic Athletes at the 2000 Summer Paralympics =

- IPC code: IPA

in Sydney
- Competitors: 2 in 2 sports
- Medals: Gold 0 Silver 0 Bronze 0 Total 0

Summer Paralympics appearances (overview)
- 1992; 1996; 2000; 2004–2012; 2016; 2020; 2024

Other related appearances
- Timor-Leste (2008–pres.)

Should not be confused with Independent Paralympic Participants, the name given to Yugoslavian athletes at the 1992 Summer Paralympics

In 2000, East Timor was administered by the United Nations, and did not have a recognised National Paralympic Committee. Two East Timor athletes took part in the 2000 Summer Paralympics in Sydney, but they competed officially as Individual Paralympic Athletes, rather than as representatives of an NPC.

There were two "individual Paralympians" from East Timor: Alcino Pereira in the men's 5,000m race (T38 category) in track and field; and Mateus Lukas in powerlifting, in the men's up to 48 kg category. Pereira failed to complete his race, while Lukas lifted 105 kg, finishing 13th and last of the athletes who successfully lifted a weight in his category.

Following East Timor's recognition, the country made its official Paralympic début in 2008.

== Results ==
Name	Sport	Event	Score	Rank
Alcino Pereira	Athletics	Men's 5,000m T38	dnf	unranked (dnf)
Mateus Lukas	Powerlifting	Men's up to 48 kg	105 kg	13th (out of 16)

== See also ==
- East Timor at the Paralympics
- Individual Olympic Athletes at the 2000 Summer Olympics
- Individual Paralympic Athletes at the 2016 Summer Paralympics
