= Augusto Ramos Soares =

East Timorese long-distance runner

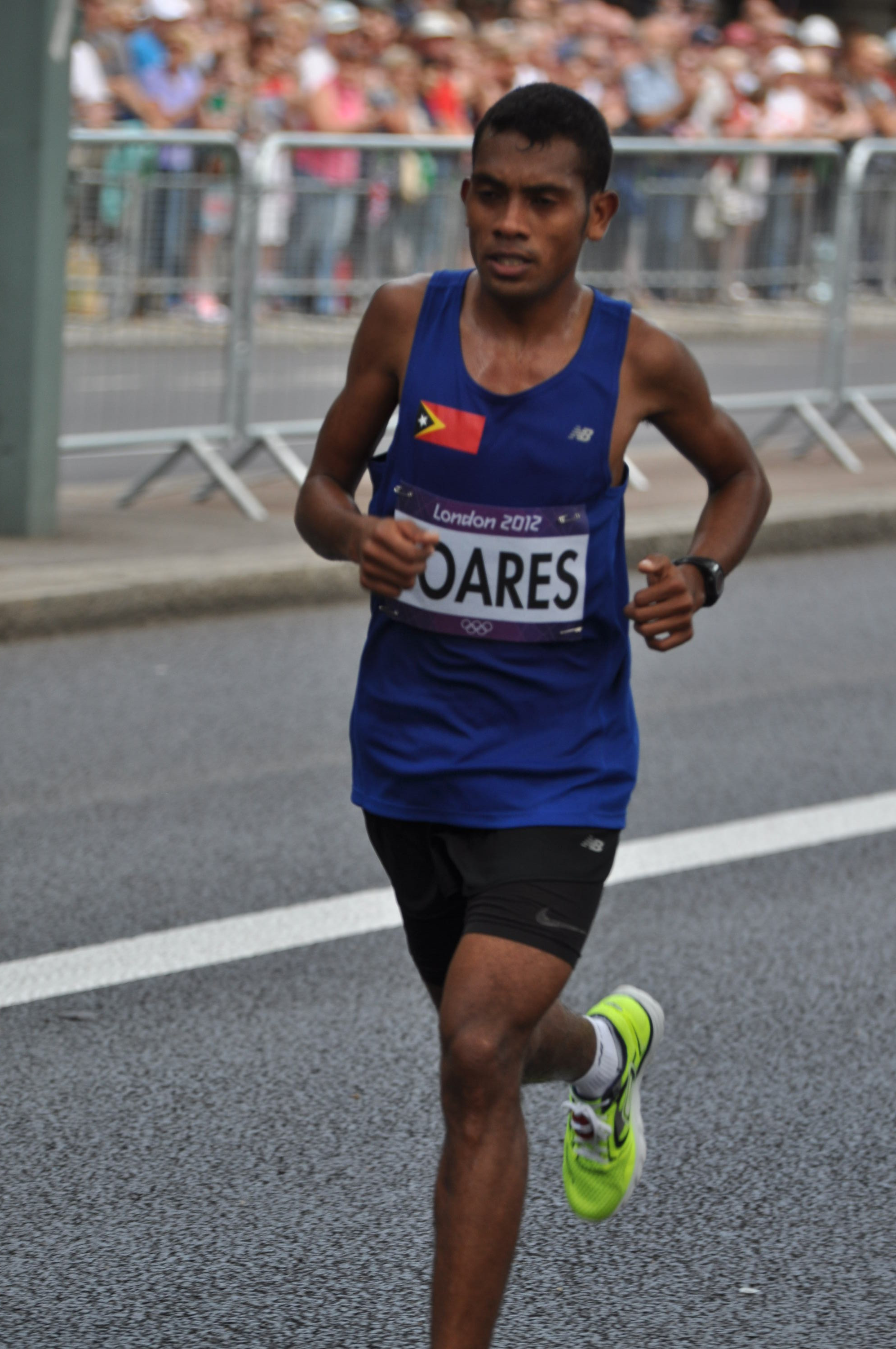
- Soares in the marathon at the 2012 Olympics in London

Personal information
- Born: 22 August 1986 (age 40) Baucau, Timor Timur, Indonesia
- Height: 1.65 m (5 ft 5 in)
- Weight: 58 kg (128 lb)

Sport
- Country: East Timor
- Event: Marathon
- College team: University of Timor Lorosae, Dili, TLS
- Club: Sport Lauraran Benfica (SLB), Dili, TLS
- Coached by: Antonio Dacosta from 2012 (Athlete, 24 Jul 2012)

Achievements and titles
- Olympic finals: 2012
- Personal bests: Marathon;: 2:30.04; 1500m: 4:11.35

Augusto Ramos Soares (born 22 August 1986 in Baucau, Timor Timur, Indonesia) is an East Timorese long-distance runner. He represented his country in the marathon event at the 2012 Summer Olympics in London, finishing in 84th place. He was also East Timor's flag-bearer at the 2012 Games.

He was inspired to run by a visit to his school by Aguida Amaral, East Timor's first Olympic athlete. His pre-Olympic personal best was 2:30:04. He qualified for the 2008 Summer Olympics but did not participate. He came second at the Dili Marathon in 2010 and 2011.

He competed for East Timor at the 2016 Summer Olympics in the men's 1500 metres event. He finished 12th in his heat and did not qualify for the semifinals. However, he did run a personal best with a time of 4:11.35. He was the flag bearer for East Timor during the closing ceremony.
