= Aguida Amaral =

East Timorese marathon runner

Águida Amaral
Personal information
- Born: 27 May 1972 (age 54) Dili, Portuguese Timor

Sport
- Country: East Timor
- Event: Marathon

Achievements and titles
- Olympic finals: 2000, 2004
- Personal bests: Marathon;: 3:03:53

Águida Fátima Amaral (born 27 May 1972) is an East Timorese athlete. She was one of the first athletes to represent East Timor at the Olympic Games, and the first woman to represent the nation, when she ran the marathon at the 2000 Summer Olympics in Sydney. She technically competed as an individual athlete because East Timor was newly independent and had not yet been formally recognized by the International Olympic Committee. With a time of 3:10:55, she finished 43rd out of the 45 runners who completed the race, although eight other runners failed to finish.

The Associated Press reported:

Not realizing she had one more lap to run, Amaral stopped near the finish line and placed her hands together as she knelt to the track. An official gently informed Amaral she was not done, and she took one more lap to rousing applause.

The Independent likewise reported that Amaral "completed the course to a standing ovation".

The Sydney Olympics followed East Timor's declaration of independence from Indonesia in 1999, and the ensuing violence. Amaral had fled her home in Dili, stayed in a refugee camp, and returned eventually to find it looted and burned. Along with her home and other belongings, her only pair of running shoes had been destroyed in the arson attack. She trained for the Olympics by running barefoot, until shoes were donated to her by Australia.

CNN described her arrival in the stadium as "the most moving moment" of the race. The New York Times wrote that her "performance in the Sydney Games inspired the world", and described her as "a source of national pride".

Amaral competed again at the 2004 Summer Olympics in Athens, this time formally representing East Timor – the only one aside from fellow marathonist Gil da Cruz Trindade. She finished with a time of 3:18:25, being 65th of the 66 runners who completed the marathon – her time over half an hour faster than that of Mongolia's Luvsanlkhündegiin Otgonbayar.

Amaral is a police officer, and as of 2004, has four children.

== Achievements ==
- All results regarding marathon, unless stated otherwise

Year	Competition	Venue	Position	Notes
Competed as an Individual Olympic Athletes
2000	Olympic Games	Sydney, Australia	43rd	3:10:55
Representing Timor-Leste
2004	Olympic Games	Athens, Greece	65th	3:18:25
2005	World Championships	Helsinki, Finland	—	DNF
