= Individual Olympic Athletes at the 2000 Summer Olympics =

- East Timorese athletes competed under the Olympic Flag
- IOC code: IOA

in Sydney, Australia 15 September – 1 October 2000
- Competitors: 4 in 3 sports
- Medals: Gold 0 Silver 0 Bronze 0 Total 0

Summer Olympics appearances (overview)
- 1992; 1996; 2000; 2004–2008; 2012; 2016; 2020; 2024

Other related appearances
- Timor-Leste (2004–pres.)

Four athletes from East Timor, at the time under United Nations administration, competed as individual Olympic athletes at the 2000 Summer Olympics in Sydney, Australia.

== Results by event ==
=== Athletics ===
Track and road events

Athletes	Events	Final	
Athletes	Events	Time	Rank
Calisto da Costa	Men's Marathon	2:33:11	71
Aguida Amaral	Women's Marathon	3:10:55	43

=== Boxing ===
Athlete	Event	Round of 32	Round of 16	Quarterfinals	Semifinals	Final	
Athlete	Event	Opposition Result	Opposition Result	Opposition Result	Opposition Result	Opposition Result	Rank
Victor Ramos	Lightweight	Raymond Narh (GHA); L RSC	Did not advance				

=== Weightlifting ===
Men

Athlete	Event	Snatch			Clean & Jerk			Total	Rank
Athlete	Event	1	2	3	1	2	3	Total	Rank
Martinho de Araújo	– 56 kg	~~65.0~~	~~65.0~~	67.5	85.0	90.0	~~95.0~~	157.5	20

== See also ==
- Individual Paralympic Athletes at the 2000 Summer Paralympics
