= National Olympic Committee of Timor-Leste =

National Olympic Committee

- Country: Timor-Leste
- Code: TLS
- Created: 2002
- Recognized: 2003
- Continental Association: OCA
- President: Francisco Kalbuadi Lay
- Secretary General: Laurentino Guterres

The National Olympic Committee of Timor-Leste (Portuguese: Comité Olímpico Nacional de Timor-Leste, IOC code: TLS) is the National Olympic Committee representing Timor-Leste, also known as East Timor.

== See also ==
- Timor-Leste at the Olympics
- Timor-Leste at the Asian Games
- Timor-Leste at the SEA Games
- Football Federation of Timor-Leste
- Sport in Timor-Leste
