= 2015 World Taekwondo Championships – Men's flyweight =

Taekwondo competition

Men's flyweight at the 2015 World Championships
- Venue: Traktor Ice Arena
- Dates: 12–13 May 2015
- Competitors: 79 from 78 nations

Medalists
gold medal	Farzan Ashourzadeh	Iran
silver medal	Si Mohamed Ketbi
bronze medal	Ruslan Poiseev	Russia
bronze medal	Zhao Shuai	China

The men's flyweight is a competition featured at the 2015 World Taekwondo Championships, and was held at the Traktor Ice Arena in Chelyabinsk, Russia on May 12 and May 13.

Flyweights were limited to a maximum of 58 kilograms in body mass.

== Results ==
Legend

- DQ — Won by disqualification

=== Finals ===
Quarterfinals		Semifinals		Final
Farzan Ashourzadeh (IRI)	9
Carlos Navarro (MEX)	2	Farzan Ashourzadeh (IRI)	12
Lucas Guzmán (ARG)	6	Ruslan Poiseev (RUS)	11
Ruslan Poiseev (RUS)	8			Farzan Ashourzadeh (IRI)	8
Mahammad Mammadov (AZE)	10			Si Mohamed Ketbi (WTF)	3
Zhao Shuai (CHN)	13	Zhao Shuai (CHN)	7
Si Mohamed Ketbi (WTF)	11	Si Mohamed Ketbi (WTF)	14
Levent Tuncat (GER)	9

=== Top half ===
==== Section 1 ====
Round of 128
Egers Aliu (ALB)	10
Almaz Toktomatov (KGZ)	11

Round of 64
Farzan Ashourzadeh (IRI)	17
Almaz Toktomatov (KGZ)	3
Chester Peralta (ECU)	DQ
~~Mohammed Qatanani (SWE)~~
Nutthawee Klompong (THA)	DQ
~~El-Sadig El-Badawi (SUD)~~
Stanislav Staykov (BUL)	2
Vadim Dimitrov (MDA)	9

Round of 32
Farzan Ashourzadeh (IRI)	14
Chester Peralta (ECU)	6
Nutthawee Klompong (THA)	6
Vadim Dimitrov (MDA)	5

Round of 16
Farzan Ashourzadeh (IRI)	11
Nutthawee Klompong (THA)	1

==== Section 2 ====
Round of 128
~~Phineas Dzingi (ZIM)~~
Mubarak Al-Shareef (KSA)	DQ
Sebastián Navea (CHI)	DQ
~~Wu Yu Tai (RSA)~~

Round of 64
El-Said Shawky (EGY)	10
Mubarak Al-Shareef (KSA)	7
~~Isah Adamu (NGR)~~
Eryk Rodzik (POL)	DQ
Frederico Muianga (MOZ)	4
Francisco Palacios (GUA)	16
Sebastián Navea (CHI)	2
Carlos Navarro (MEX)	9

Round of 32
El-Said Shawky (EGY)	14
Eryk Rodzik (POL)	1
Francisco Palacios (GUA)	7
Carlos Navarro (MEX)	9

Round of 16
El-Said Shawky (EGY)	3
Carlos Navarro (MEX)	5

==== Section 3 ====
Round of 128
Achitkhüügiin Natsagdorj (MGL)	DQ
~~Hussain Al-Maazmi (UAE)~~
Mustapha Abakar (CHA)	8
Teddy Teng (FPO)	14

Round of 64
Lucas Guzmán (ARG)	6
Achitkhüügiin Natsagdorj (MGL)	1
Hüseyin Bezci (TUR)	7
Cho Gang-min (KOR)	19
~~Romain Trolliet (ALG)~~
Hou Kuang-wu (TPE)	DQ
Teddy Teng (FPO)	7
Dylan Chellamootoo (FRA)	14

Round of 32
Lucas Guzmán (ARG)	16
Cho Gang-min (KOR)	15
Hou Kuang-wu (TPE)	10
Dylan Chellamootoo (FRA)	9

Round of 16
Lucas Guzmán (ARG)	4
Hou Kuang-wu (TPE)	2

==== Section 4 ====
Round of 128
Omar Hajjami (MAR)	16
Kadriddin Ashurov (TJK)	14
~~Mohammad Rumman (JOR)~~
Josh Calland (GBR)	DQ

Round of 64
~~Luisito Pié (DOM)~~
Omar Hajjami (MAR)	DQ
Charles Mouketou (GAB)	10
Wasiu Tadjou (CIV)	11
Yousef Shriha (LBA)	19
Jin Agojo (PHI)	20
Josh Calland (GBR)	12
Ruslan Poiseev (RUS)	15

Round of 32
Omar Hajjami (MAR)	8
Wasiu Tadjou (CIV)	9
Jin Agojo (PHI)	5
Ruslan Poiseev (RUS)	18

Round of 16
Wasiu Tadjou (CIV)	4
Ruslan Poiseev (RUS)	13

=== Bottom half ===
==== Section 5 ====
Round of 128
Víctor González (PAN)	17
Yousef Abu Al-Rob (PLE)	15
Mikael Kalikat (COD)	DQ
~~Sven Lorrimer (GUY)~~

Round of 64
Rui Bragança (POR)	6
Víctor González (PAN)	1
Mahammad Mammadov (AZE)	6
Faisal Jeylani Aweys (SOM)	1
~~Ron Atias (ISR)~~
Drew Pluemer (USA)	DQ
Mikael Kalikat (COD)	4
Nursultan Mamayev (KAZ)	13

Round of 32
Rui Bragança (POR)	1
Mahammad Mammadov (AZE)	2
Drew Pluemer (USA)	1
Nursultan Mamayev (KAZ)	2

Round of 16
Mahammad Mammadov (AZE)	2
Nursultan Mamayev (KAZ)	1

==== Section 6 ====
Round of 128
Ahmad Nawid Zaher (AFG)	8
Chrysostomos Kouttoukis (CYP)	5
Machario Patti (NED)	6
Leonardo Moraes (BRA)	5

Round of 64
Zhao Shuai (CHN)	13
Ahmad Nawid Zaher (AFG)	0
Mohammed Al-Mahrouqi (OMA)	13
Nguyễn Văn Duy (VIE)	23
Meisam Rafiei (ISL)	7
Haykaz Samvelyan (ARM)	8
Machario Patti (NED)	4
Safwan Khalil (AUS)	8

Round of 32
Zhao Shuai (CHN)	2
Nguyễn Văn Duy (VIE)	1
Haykaz Samvelyan (ARM)	4
Safwan Khalil (AUS)	5

Round of 16
Zhao Shuai (CHN)	10
Safwan Khalil (AUS)	1

==== Section 7 ====
Round of 128
Adama Ballo (MLI)	12
Manuel de Carvalho (ANG)	6
Chan Chon In (MAC)	7
Regis Iyumva (RWA)	13

Round of 64
Si Mohamed Ketbi (WTF)	16
Adama Ballo (MLI)	3
Yahor Nikitsenka (BLR)	10
Alex Falgas (ESP)	8
Óscar Muñoz (COL)	13
Wandile Maziya (SWZ)	4
Regis Iyumva (RWA)	4
Heiner Oviedo (CRC)	14

Round of 32
Si Mohamed Ketbi (WTF)	15
Yahor Nikitsenka (BLR)	6
Óscar Muñoz (COL)	7
Heiner Oviedo (CRC)	9

Round of 16
Si Mohamed Ketbi (WTF)	15
Heiner Oviedo (CRC)	9

==== Section 8 ====
Round of 128
~~Şanepes Hudaýberdiýew (TKM)~~
Sergio Suzuki (JPN)	DQ
Luis Oblitas (PER)	4
Yaroslav Shvets (UKR)	2

Round of 64
Miloš Gladović (SRB)	4
Sergio Suzuki (JPN)	5
Mahloane Mahloane (LES)	4
Vincent Foster (CAN)	27
Eleftherios Fakinos (GRE)	13
Mario Leal (VEN)	10
Luis Oblitas (PER)	2
Levent Tuncat (GER)	16

Round of 32
Sergio Suzuki (JPN)	4
Vincent Foster (CAN)	2
Eleftherios Fakinos (GRE)	5
Levent Tuncat (GER)	14

Round of 16
Sergio Suzuki (JPN)	8
Levent Tuncat (GER)	13
