= China at the 2016 Summer Olympics =

- IOC code: CHN
- NOC: Chinese Olympic Committee
- Website: www.olympic.cn (in Chinese and English)

in Rio de Janeiro
- Competitors: 416 in 26 sports
- Flag bearers: Lei Sheng (opening); Ding Ning (closing)
- Medals Ranked 3rd: Gold 26 Silver 18 Bronze 26 Total 70

Summer Olympics appearances (overview)
- 1952; 1956–1980; 1984; 1988; 1992; 1996; 2000; 2004; 2008; 2012; 2016; 2020; 2024; 2028

Other related appearances
- Republic of China (1924–1948)

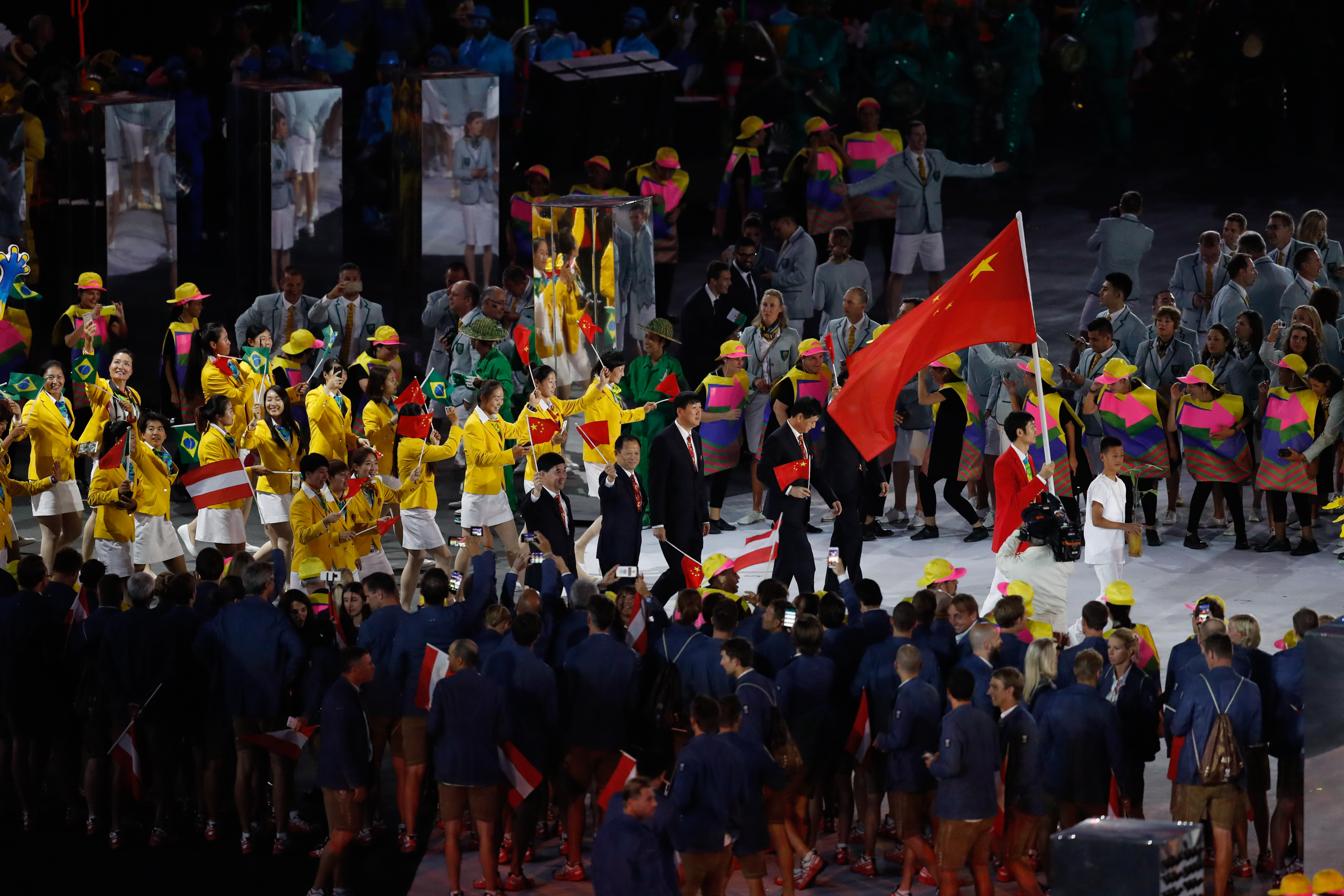
The Chinese Olympic team during the opening ceremony.

The People's Republic of China competed at the 2016 Summer Olympics in Rio de Janeiro, Brazil, from 5 to 21 August 2016. This was the nation's tenth appearance at the Summer Olympics since its debut in 1952.

== Medalists ==
Medal	Name	Sport	Event	Date
Gold	Zhang Mengxue	Shooting	Women's 10 m air pistol	August 7
Gold	Shi Tingmao; Wu Minxia	Diving	Women's 3 m synchronized springboard	August 7
Gold	Long Qingquan	Weightlifting	Men's 56 kg	August 7
Gold	Chen Aisen; Lin Yue	Diving	Men's synchronized 10 metre platform	August 8
Gold	Sun Yang	Swimming	Men's 200 metre freestyle	August 8
Gold	Deng Wei	Weightlifting	Women's 63 kg	August 9
Gold	Chen Ruolin; Liu Huixia	Diving	Women's 10 m synchronized platform	August 9
Gold	Shi Zhiyong	Weightlifting	Men's 69 kg	August 9
Gold	Xiang Yanmei	Weightlifting	Women's 69 kg	August 10
Gold	Ding Ning	Table tennis	Women's singles	August 10
Gold	Ma Long	Table tennis	Men's singles	August 11
Gold	Wang Zhen	Athletics	Men's 20 kilometres walk	August 12
Gold	Gong Jinjie; Zhong Tianshi	Cycling	Women's team sprint	August 12
Gold	Shi Tingmao	Diving	Women's 3 m springboard	August 14
Gold	Meng Suping	Weightlifting	Women's +75 kg	August 14
Gold	Cao Yuan	Diving	Men's 3 m springboard	August 16
Gold	Ding Ning; Li Xiaoxia; Liu Shiwen	Table tennis	Women's team	August 16
Gold	Ma Long; Xu Xin; Zhang Jike	Table tennis	Men's team	August 17
Gold	Zhao Shuai	Taekwondo	Men's 58 kg	August 17
Gold	Ren Qian	Diving	Women's 10 m platform	August 18
Gold	Fu Haifeng; Zhang Nan	Badminton	Men's doubles	August 19
Gold	Liu Hong	Athletics	Women's 20 km walk	August 19
Gold	Chen Long	Badminton	Men's singles	August 20
Gold	Chen Aisen	Diving	Men's 10 m platform	August 20
Gold	Zheng Shuyin	Taekwondo	Women's +67 kg	August 20
Gold	China women's national volleyball team: Yuan Xinyue; Zhu Ting; Yang Fangxu; Gong Xiangyu; Wei Qiuyue; Zhang Changning; Lin Li; Ding Xia; Yan Ni; Liu Xiaotong; Xu Yunli; Hui Ruoqi	Volleyball	Women's tournament	August 20
Silver	Lü Xiaojun	Weightlifting	Men's 77 kg	August 10
Silver	Du Li	Shooting	Women's 10 m air rifle	August 6
Silver	Sun Yang	Swimming	Men's 400 m freestyle	August 6
Silver	Xu Jiayu	Swimming	Men's 100 m backstroke	August 8
Silver	Li Xiaoxia	Table tennis	Women's singles	August 10
Silver	Zhang Binbin	Shooting	Women's 50 m rifle three positions	August 11
Silver	Hao Jialu; Sun Yiwen; Sun Yujie; Xu Anqi	Fencing	Women's team épée	August 11
Silver	Zhang Jike	Table tennis	Men's singles	August 11
Silver	Cai Zelin	Athletics	Men's 20 km walk	August 12
Silver	Tian Tao	Weightlifting	Men's 85 kg	August 12
Silver	Dong Dong	Gymnastics	Men's trampoline	August 13
Silver	Chen Peina	Sailing	Women's RS:X	August 14
Silver	He Zi	Diving	Women's 3 m springboard	August 14
Silver	Zhang Wenxiu	Athletics	Women's hammer throw	August 15
Silver	Huang Xuechen; Sun Wenyan	Synchronized swimming	Women's duet	August 16
Silver	Si Yajie	Diving	Women's 10 m platform	August 18
Silver	Gu Xiao; Guo Li; Huang Xuechen; Li Xiaolu; Liang Xinping; Sun Wenyan; Tang Mengni; Yin Chengxin; Zeng Zhen	Synchronized swimming	Women's team	August 19
Silver	Yin Junhua	Boxing	Women's lightweight	August 19
Bronze	Yi Siling	Shooting	Women's 10 m air rifle	August 6
Bronze	Sun Yiwen	Fencing	Women's épée	August 6
Bronze	Pang Wei	Shooting	Men's 10 m air pistol	August 6
Bronze	Deng Shudi; Lin Chaopan; Liu Yang; You Hao; Zhang Chenglong	Gymnastics	Men's artistic team all-around	August 8
Bronze	Fu Yuanhui	Swimming	Women's 100 m backstroke	August 8
Bronze	Fan Yilin; Mao Yi; Shang Chunsong; Tan Jiaxin; Wang Yan	Gymnastics	Women's artistic team all-around	August 9
Bronze	Cheng Xunzhao	Judo	Men's 90 kg	August 10
Bronze	Cao Yuan; Qin Kai	Diving	Men's 3 m synchronized springboard	August 10
Bronze	Du Li	Shooting	Women's 50 m rifle three positions	August 11
Bronze	Shi Jinglin	Swimming	Women's 200 m breaststroke	August 11
Bronze	Wang Shun	Swimming	Men's 200 m individual medley	August 11
Bronze	Huang Wenyi; Pan Feihong	Rowing	Women's lightweight double sculls	August 12
Bronze	Yu Song	Judo	Women's +78 kg	August 12
Bronze	Li Dan	Gymnastics	Women's trampoline	August 12
Bronze	Duan Jingli	Rowing	Women's single sculls	August 13
Bronze	Li Yuehong	Shooting	Men's 25 m rapid fire pistol	August 13
Bronze	Gao Lei	Gymnastics	Men's trampoline	August 13
Bronze	Dong Bin	Athletics	Men's triple jump	August 16
Bronze	Zhang Nan; Zhao Yunlei	Badminton	Mixed doubles	August 16
Bronze	Sun Yanan	Wrestling	Women's freestyle 48 kg	August 17
Bronze	Ren Cancan	Boxing	Women's flyweight	August 18
Bronze	Zhang Fengliu	Wrestling	Women's freestyle 75 kg	August 18
Bronze	Hu Jianguan	Boxing	Men's flyweight	August 19
Bronze	Li Qian	Boxing	Women's middleweight	August 19
Bronze	Lü Xiuzhi	Athletics	Women's 20 km walk	August 19
Bronze	Feng Shanshan	Golf	Women's individual	August 20

Medals by sport
Sport	1st place, gold medalist(s)	2nd place, silver medalist(s)	3rd place, bronze medalist(s)	Total
Diving	7	2	1	10
Weightlifting	5	2	0	7
Table tennis	4	2	0	6
Athletics	2	2	2	6
Badminton	2	0	1	3
Taekwondo	2	0	0	2
Shooting	1	2	4	7
Swimming	1	2	3	6
Cycling	1	0	0	1
Volleyball	1	0	0	1
Synchronized swimming	0	2	0	2
Gymnastics	0	1	4	5
Boxing	0	1	3	4
Fencing	0	1	1	2
Sailing	0	1	0	1
Judo	0	0	2	2
Rowing	0	0	2	2
Wrestling	0	0	2	2
Golf	0	0	1	1
Total	26	18	26	70

Medals by day
Day	Date	1st place, gold medalist(s)	2nd place, silver medalist(s)	3rd place, bronze medalist(s)	Total
1	August 6	0	2	3	5
2	August 7	3	0	0	3
3	August 8	2	1	2	5
4	August 9	3	0	1	4
5	August 10	2	2	2	6
6	August 11	1	3	3	7
7	August 12	2	2	3	7
8	August 13	0	1	3	4
9	August 14	2	2	0	4
10	August 15	0	1	0	1
11	August 16	2	1	2	5
12	August 17	2	0	1	3
13	August 18	1	1	2	4
14	August 19	2	2	3	7
15	August 20	4	0	1	5
	Total	26	18	26	70

Medals by gender
Gender	1st place, gold medalist(s)	2nd place, silver medalist(s)	3rd place, bronze medalist(s)	Total	Percentage
Male	12	7	9	28	40.0%
Female	14	11	16	41	58.6%
Mixed	0	0	1	1	1.4%
Total	26	18	26	70	100%

=== Multiple medallists ===
The following Team China competitors won several medals at the 2016 Olympic Games.

Name	Medal	Sport	Event
Shi Tingmao	Gold; Gold	Diving	Women's 3 m synchronized springboard Women's 3 m springboard
Chen Aisen	Gold; Gold	Diving	Men's 10 m synchronized platform Men's 10 m platform
Ding Ning	Gold; Gold	Table tennis	Women's singles Women's team
Ma Long	Gold; Gold	Table tennis	Men's singles Men's team
Li Xiaoxia	Gold; Silver	Table tennis	Women's team Women's singles
Sun Yang	Gold; Silver	Swimming	Men's 200 m freestyle Men's 400 m freestyle
Zhang Jike	Gold; Silver	Table tennis	Men's team Men's singles
Zhang Nan	Gold; Bronze	Badminton	Men's doubles Mixed doubles
Cao Yuan	Gold; Bronze	Diving	Men's 3 metre springboard Men's 3 m synchronized springboard
Huang Xuechen	Silver; Silver	Synchronized swimming	Women's duet Women's team
Sun Wenyan	Silver; Silver	Synchronized swimming	Women's duet Women's team
Du Li	Silver; Bronze	Shooting	Women's 10 m air rifle Women's 50 m rifle three positions
Sun Yiwen	Silver; Bronze	Fencing	Women's team épée Women's épée

== Competitors ==
The following is the list of number of competitors participating in the Games. Note that reserves in fencing, field hockey, football, and handball are counted as athletes:

Sport	Men	Women	Total
Archery	3	3	6
Athletics	27	29	56
Badminton	7	8	15
Basketball	12	12	24
Boxing	8	3	11
Canoeing	4	6	10
Cycling	5	9	14
Diving	6	7	13
Equestrian	1	0	1
Fencing	6	7	13
Field hockey	0	18	18
Football	0	18	18
Golf	2	2	4
Gymnastics	7	13	20
Judo	2	4	6
Modern pentathlon	2	2	4
Rowing	7	12	19
Sailing	4	4	8
Shooting	12	10	22
Swimming	19	26	45
Synchronized swimming	—	9	9
Table tennis	4	4	8
Taekwondo	2	2	4
Tennis	0	5	5
Triathlon	1	1	2
Volleyball	0	14	14
Water polo	0	13	13
Weightlifting	6	4	10
Wrestling	8	5	13
Total	155	250	405

== Archery ==
Chinese archers qualified each for the men's and women's events after having secured a top eight finish in their respective team recurves at the 2015 World Archery Championships in Copenhagen, Denmark. The Chinese archery team was named to the Olympic roster on July 6, 2016.

Men

Athlete	Event	Ranking round		Round of 64	Round of 32	Round of 16	Quarterfinals	Semifinals	Final / BM	
Athlete	Event	Score	Seed	Opposition Score	Opposition Score	Opposition Score	Opposition Score	Opposition Score	Opposition Score	Rank
Gu Xuesong	Individual	670	17	Duzelbayev (KAZ); L 4–6	Did not advance					
Wang Dapeng	Individual	667	19	Malavé (VEN); L 2–6	Did not advance					
Xing Yu	Individual	660	32	Agatha (INA); L 1–7	Did not advance					
Gu Xuesong; Wang Dapeng; Xing Yu	Team	1997	6	—N/a		Brazil; W 6–2	Italy; W 6–0	United States; L 0–6	Australia; L 2–6	4

Women

Athlete	Event	Ranking round		Round of 64	Round of 32	Round of 16	Quarterfinals	Semifinals	Final / BM	
Athlete	Event	Score	Seed	Opposition Score	Opposition Score	Opposition Score	Opposition Score	Opposition Score	Opposition Score	Rank
Cao Hui	Individual	631	28	Senyuk (AZE); W 7–1	Dashidorzhieva (RUS); W 6–4	Unruh (GER); L 2–6	Did not advance			
Qi Yuhong	Individual	649	11	Canetta (BRA); W 7–1	Longová (SVK); W 6–0	Wu Jx (CHN); L 5–6	Did not advance			
Wu Jiaxin	Individual	653	6	Hayashi (JPN); W 7–1	Mîrca (MDA); W 6–0	Qi Yh (CHN); W 6–5	Ki B-b (KOR); L 2–6	Did not advance		
Cao Hui; Qi Yuhong; Wu Jiaxin	Team	1933	3	—N/a		Bye	Italy; L 3–5	Did not advance		

== Athletics ==
Chinese athletes have so far achieved qualifying standards in the following athletics events (up to a maximum of 3 athletes in each event):

Following the end of the qualifying period on July 11, a total of 56 athletes (27 men and 29 women) were named to the Chinese track and field roster for the Games. Among them featured defending Olympic champion Chen Ding and bronze medalists Wang Zhen and Qieyang Shijie in race walking, high jumper and 2015 Worlds silver medalist Zhang Guowei, sprinter Su Bingtian, shot putter Gong Lijiao, and hammer thrower Zhang Wenxiu.

Key

- Note–Ranks given for track events are within the athlete's heat only
- Q = Qualified for the next round
- q = Qualified for the next round as a fastest loser or, in field events, by position without achieving the qualifying target
- NR = National record
- N/A = Round not applicable for the event
- Bye = Athlete not required to compete in round

Track & road events
Men

Athlete	Event	Heat		Quarterfinal		Semifinal		Final	
Athlete	Event	Result	Rank	Result	Rank	Result	Rank	Result	Rank
Cai Zelin	20 km walk	—N/a						1:19:26	2nd place, silver medalist(s)
Chen Ding	20 km walk	—N/a						1:23:54	39
Dong Guojian	Marathon	—N/a						2:15:32	29
Duo Bujie	Marathon	—N/a						2:24:22	91
Han Yucheng	50 km walk	—N/a						4:32:35	47
Su Bingtian	100 m	Bye		10.17	3 q	10.08	4	Did not advance	
Wang Zhen	20 km walk	—N/a						1:19:14	1st place, gold medalist(s)
Wang Zhendong	50 km walk	—N/a						3:48:50	11
Xie Wenjun	110 m hurdles	13.69	7	—N/a		Did not advance			
Xie Zhenye	100 m	Bye		10.08	1 Q	10.11	7	Did not advance	
Yu Wei	50 km walk	—N/a						3:43:00	5
Zhang Peimeng	100 m	Bye		10.36	7	Did not advance			
Zhu Renxue	Marathon	—N/a						2:25:31	96
Mo Youxue; Su Bingtian; Tang Xingqiang; Xie Zhenye; Yang Yang; Zhang Peimeng	4 × 100 m relay	37.82 AR	2 Q	—N/a				37.90	4

Women

Athlete	Event	Heat		Quarterfinal		Semifinal		Final	
Athlete	Event	Result	Rank	Result	Rank	Result	Rank	Result	Rank
Hua Shaoqing	Marathon	—N/a						2:45:09	79
Liu Hong	20 km walk	—N/a						1:28:35	1st place, gold medalist(s)
Lu Xiuzhi	20 km walk	—N/a						1:28:42	3rd place, bronze medalist(s)
Qieyang Shenjie	20 km walk	—N/a						1:29:04	5
Wang Chunyu	800 m	1:59.93	4	—N/a		2:04.05	8	Did not advance	
Wei Yongli	100 m	Bye		11.48	5	Did not advance			
Wu Shuijiao	100 m hurdles	13.03	4	—N/a		Did not advance			
Yuan Qiqi	100 m	Bye		11.56	6	Did not advance			
Yue Chao	Marathon	—N/a						2:39:09	53
Zhang Xinyan	3000 m steeplechase	9:31.47	19	—N/a				Did not advance	
Ge Manqi; Kong Lingwei; Liang Xiaojing; Lin Huijun; Wei Yongli; Yuan Qiqi	4 × 100 m relay	42.70	4	—N/a				Did not advance	

Field events
Men

Athlete	Event	Qualification		Final	
Athlete	Event	Distance	Position	Distance	Position
Cao Shuo	Triple jump	16.97	5 Q	17.13	4
Dong Bin	Triple jump	17.10	2 Q	17.58	3rd place, bronze medalist(s)
Huang Bokai	Pole vault	5.45	=16	Did not advance	
Gao Xinglong	Long jump	NM	—	Did not advance	
Huang Changzhou	Long jump	7.95	9 q	7.85	11
Wang Jianan	Long jump	8.24	1 Q	8.17	5
Wang Yu	High jump	2.22	32	Did not advance	
Xu Xiaolong	Triple jump	16.65	11 q	16.41	11
Xue Changrui	Pole vault	5.70	=4 Q	5.65	6
Yao Jie	Pole vault	5.60	14	Did not advance	
Zhang Guowei	High jump	2.22	=25	Did not advance	

Women

Athlete	Event	Qualification		Final	
Athlete	Event	Distance	Position	Distance	Position
Bian Ka	Shot put	17.68	16	Did not advance	
Chen Yang	Discus throw	61.44	10 q	63.11	7
Feng Bin	Discus throw	62.01	8 Q	63.06	8
Gao Yang	Shot put	16.17	33	Did not advance	
Gong Lijiao	Shot put	18.74	5 Q	19.39	4
Li Ling	Pole vault	4.55	16	Did not advance	
Li Lingwei	Javelin throw	60.91	15	Did not advance	
Li Xiaohong	Triple jump	13.30	34	Did not advance	
Liu Shiying	Javelin throw	57.16	23	Did not advance	
Liu Tingting	Hammer throw	69.14	16	Did not advance	
Lü Huihui	Javelin throw	63.28	7 Q	64.04	7
Ren Mengqian	Pole vault	NM	—	Did not advance	
Su Xinyue	Discus throw	65.14	2 Q	64.37	5
Wang Zheng	Hammer throw	70.60	10 q	NM	—
Zhang Wenxiu	Hammer throw	73.58	2 Q	76.75	2nd place, silver medalist(s)

== Badminton ==
China has qualified a total of fifteen badminton players for each of the following events into the Olympic tournament based on the BWF World Rankings as of 5 May 2016: two entries each in the men's and women's singles, as well as two pairs each in the men's, women's, and mixed doubles.

Men

Athlete	Event	Group Stage				Elimination	Quarterfinal	Semifinal	Final / BM	
Athlete	Event	Opposition Score	Opposition Score	Opposition Score	Rank	Opposition Score	Opposition Score	Opposition Score	Opposition Score	Rank
Chen Long	Singles	Cordón (GUA); W WO	Dziółko (POL); W (21–12, 21–9)	Karunaratne (SRI); W (21–7, 21–10)	1 Q	Bye	Son W-h (KOR); W (21–11, 18–21, 21–11)	Axelsen (DEN); W (21–14, 21–15)	Lee C W (MAS); W (21–18, 21–18)	1st place, gold medalist(s)
Lin Dan	Singles	Malkov (RUS); W (21–18, 21–7)	Obernosterer (AUT); W (21–5, 21–11)	Nguyễn T M (VIE); W (21–7, 21–12)	1 Q	Bye	Kidambi (IND); W (21–6, 11–21, 21–18)	Lee C W (MAS); L (21–15, 11–21, 20–22)	Axelsen (DEN); L (21–15, 10–21, 17–21)	4
Chai Biao; Hong Wei	Doubles	Ahsan / Setiawan (INA); W (21–15, 21–17)	Attri / Reddy (IND); W (21–13, 21–15)	Endo / Hayakawa (JPN); L (18–21, 21–14, 21–23)	2 Q	—N/a	Ivanov / Sozonov (RUS); W (21–13, 16–21, 21–16)	Goh V S / Tan W K (MAS); L (18–21, 21–12, 17–21)	Ellis / Langridge (GBR); L (18–21, 21–19, 10–21)	4
Fu Haifeng; Zhang Nan	Doubles	Chew / Pongnairat (USA); W (21–6, 21–7)	Fuchs / Schöttler (GER); W (21–11, 21–16)	Goh V S / Tan W K (MAS); L (21–16, 15–21, 18–21)	2 Q	—N/a	Kim G-j / Kim S-r (KOR); W (11–21, 21–18, 24–22)	Ellis / Langridge (GBR); W (21–14, 21–18)	Goh V S / Tan W K (MAS); W (16–21, 21–11, 23–21)	1st place, gold medalist(s)

Women

Athlete	Event	Group Stage				Elimination	Quarterfinal	Semifinal	Final / BM	
Athlete	Event	Opposition Score	Opposition Score	Opposition Score	Rank	Opposition Score	Opposition Score	Opposition Score	Opposition Score	Rank
Li Xuerui	Singles	Wang (USA); W (21–16, 21–12)	Santos (POR); W (21–12, 21–7)	L Tan (BEL); W (21–11, 21–11)	1 Q	Bye	Buranaprasertsuk (THA); W (21–12, 21–17)	Marín (ESP); L (14–21, 16–21)	Okuhara (JPN); L WO	4
Wang Yihan	Singles	Magee (IRL); W (21–7, 21–12)	Schnaase (GER); W (21–11, 21–16)	—N/a	1 Q	Bye	Sindhu (IND); L (20–22, 19–21)	Did not advance		
Luo Ying; Luo Yu	Doubles	Jung K-e / Shin S-c (KOR); L (10–21, 14–21)	Juhl / Pedersen (DEN); W (21–11, 21–18)	Lee / Obañana (USA); W (21–14, 21–15)	3	—N/a	Did not advance			
Tang Yuanting; Yu Yang	Doubles	Chang Y-n / Lee S-h (KOR); L (18–21, 21–14, 11–21)	G Stoeva / S Stoeva (BUL); W (21–14, 21–11)	Goliszewski / Nelte (GER); W (21–10, 21–11)	2 Q	—N/a	Maheswari / Polii (INA); W (21–11, 21–14)	Pedersen / Juhl (DEN); L (16–21, 21–14, 19–21)	Jung K-e / Shin S-c (KOR); L (8–21, 17–21)	4

Mixed

Athlete	Event	Group Stage				Quarterfinal	Semifinal	Final / BM	
Athlete	Event	Opposition Score	Opposition Score	Opposition Score	Rank	Opposition Score	Opposition Score	Opposition Score	Rank
Xu Chen; Ma Jin	Doubles	Fischer Nielsen / Pedersen (DEN); W (22–24, 21–14, 21–16)	Mateusiak / Zięba (POL); L (21–13, 9–21, 19–21)	C Adcock / G Adcock (GBR); W (13–21, 22–20, 21–15)	2 Q	Ko S-h / Kim H-n (KOR); W (21–17, 21–18)	Chan P S / Goh L Y (MAS); L (12–21, 19–21)	Zhang N / Zhao Yl (CHN); L (7–21, 11–21)	4
Zhang Nan; Zhao Yunlei	Doubles	Jordan / Susanto (INA); W (21–11, 21–18)	Lee C H / Chau H W (HKG); W (21–16, 21–15)	Fuchs / Michels (GER); W (21–19, 21–16)	1 Q	Kazuno / Kurihara (JPN); W (21–14, 21–12)	Ahmad / Natsir (INA); L (16–21, 15–21)	Xu C / Ma J (CHN); W (21–7, 21–11)	3rd place, bronze medalist(s)

== Basketball ==
=== Men's tournament ===
China men's basketball team qualified for the Olympics by winning the gold medal and clinching the outright Olympic berth at the 2015 FIBA Asia Championship in Changsha. They dominated the tournament, going 9-0 and once again showing they were the clear top team in Asia. This team included newly drafted star center Zhou Qi from the Houston Rockets.

Team roster

The following is the China roster for the men's basketball tournament of the 2016 Summer Olympics.

China men's national basketball team – 2016 Summer Olympics roster
Players
Coaches

Pos.	No.	Name	Age – Date of birth	Height	Club	Ctr.
PG	4	Zhao Jiwei	20 – 25 August 1995	1.85 m (6 ft 1 in)	Liaoning Flying Leopards	(China)
G	5	Sui Ran	24 – 25 June 1992	1.94 m (6 ft 4 in)	Shandong Golden Stars	(China)
G	6	Guo Ailun	22 – 14 November 1993	1.92 m (6 ft 4 in)	Liaoning Flying Leopards	(China)
SF	8	Ding Yanyuhang	22 – 20 August 1993	2.00 m (6 ft 7 in)	Shandong Golden Stars	(China)
SF	9	Zhai Xiaochuan	23 – 24 March 1993	2.05 m (6 ft 9 in)	Beijing Ducks	(China)
G/F	10	Zhou Peng (C)	26 – 11 October 1989	2.06 m (6 ft 9 in)	Guangdong Southern Tigers	(China)
PF	11	Yi Jianlian	31 – 27 October 1984	2.13 m (7 ft 0 in)	Guangdong Southern Tigers	(China)
G/F	12	Li Gen	28 – 27 October 1987	1.96 m (6 ft 5 in)	Xinjiang Flying Tigers	(China)
C	13	Li Muhao	24 – 2 June 1992	2.18 m (7 ft 2 in)	Shenzhen Leopards	(China)
F/C	14	Zou Yuchen	20 – 5 July 1996	2.08 m (6 ft 10 in)	Bayi Rockets	(China)
F/C	15	Zhou Qi	20 – 16 January 1996	2.16 m (7 ft 1 in)	Xinjiang Flying Tigers	(China)
F/C	31	Wang Zhelin	22 – 20 January 1994	2.14 m (7 ft 0 in)	Fujian Sturgeons	(China)

Head coach

- (China) Gong Luming

Assistant coach(es)

- (China) Li Nan
- (China) Hu Xuefeng
- (China) Wu Qinglong
- (China) Cui Wanjun
- (Greece) Giannis Christopoulos

Legend

- (C) Team captain
- Club – describes last
  club before the tournament
- Age – describes age
  on 6 August 2016

Group play

Pos	Team	Pld	W	L	PF	PA	PD	Pts	Qualification
1	United States	5	5	0	524	407	+117	10	Quarterfinals
2	Australia	5	4	1	444	368	+76	9	Quarterfinals
3	France	5	3	2	423	378	+45	8	Quarterfinals
4	Serbia	5	2	3	426	387	+39	7	Quarterfinals
5	Venezuela	5	1	4	315	444	−129	6	
6	China	5	0	5	318	466	−148	5	

Source: FIBA
Rules for classification: 1) points; 2) head-to-head points; 3) head-to-head points difference; 4) head-to-head number of points scored.

6 August 2016
19:00

Boxscore

China	62–119	United States
Scoring by quarter: 10–30, 20–29, 17–32, 15–28
Pts: Yi 25; Rebs: Yi, Zhao 6 Asts: Zhao 5		Pts: Durant 25; Rebs: Anthony, Jordan 7 Asts: Durant 6

Carioca Arena 1, Rio de Janeiro
Attendance: 10,622
Referees: Stephen Seibel (CAN), Oļegs Latiševs (LAT), Sreten Radović (CRO)

8 August 2016
22:30

Boxscore

France	88–60	China
Scoring by quarter: 19–14, 23–9, 22–22, 24–15
Pts: de Colo 19; Rebs: Batum 10; Asts: Parker 8		Pts: Yi 19; Rebs: Yi 6 Asts: Ding, Guo 4

Carioca Arena 1, Rio de Janeiro
Attendance: 6,360
Referees: Juan Carlos García (ESP), Roberto Vázquez (PUR), Piotr Pastusiak (POL)

10 August 2016
22:30

Boxscore

Venezuela	72–68	China
Scoring by quarter: 25–13, 13–22, 13–15, 21–18
Pts: Colmenares 16; Rebs: Colmenares 5 Asts: Vargas 5		Pts: Guo 17; Rebs: Yi 10; Asts: Guo, Zhou 3

Carioca Arena 1, Rio de Janeiro
Attendance: 6,223
Referees: Cristiano Maranho (BRA), Sreten Radović (CRO), Guilherme Locatelli (BRA)

12 August 2016
14:15

Boxscore

China	68–93	Australia
Scoring by quarter: 14–17, 20–27, 16–21, 18–28
Pts: Yi 20; Rebs: Yi 9 Asts: Guo 5		Pts: Bairstow 17; Rebs: Bairstow 9 Asts: Dellavedova 8

Carioca Arena 1, Rio de Janeiro
Attendance: 7,704
Referees: Roberto Vázquez (PUR), Sreten Radović (CRO), Carlos Peruga (ESP)

14 August 2016
22:30

Boxscore

Serbia	94–60	China
Scoring by quarter: 24–18, 19–10, 35–15, 16–17
Pts: Bogdanović 19; Rebs: Jokić 7 Asts: Marković, Teodosić 5		Pts: Yi 20; Rebs: Wang 8 Asts: Ailun 8

Carioca Arena 1, Rio de Janeiro
Attendance: 7,367
Referees: Juan García (ESP), Guilherme Locatelli (BRA), Anne Panther (GER)

=== Women's tournament ===
China women's basketball team qualified for the Olympics with a quarterfinal victory at the 2016 FIBA World Olympic Qualifying Tournament in Nantes, France.

Team roster

The following is the China roster for the women's basketball tournament of the 2016 Summer Olympics.

China women's national basketball team – 2016 Summer Olympics roster
Players
Coaches

Pos.	No.	Name	Age – Date of birth	Height	Club	Ctr.
PG	4	Zhao Zhifang	21 – 11 August 1994	1.68 m (5 ft 6 in)	Tianjin University of Finance and Economics	(China)
SG	5	Chen Xiaojia	28 – 2 April 1988	1.82 m (6 ft 0 in)	Jiangsu Phoenix	(China)
PG	6	Li Shanshan	29 – 3 March 1987	1.78 m (5 ft 10 in)	Jiangsu Phoenix	(China)
G/F	7	Shao Ting	26 – 10 December 1989	1.84 m (6 ft 0 in)	Beijing Great Wall	(China)
SG	8	Wu Di	22 – 27 October 1993	1.82 m (6 ft 0 in)	Tianjin University of Finance and Economics	(China)
SF	9	Sun Mengxin	23 – 8 April 1993	1.90 m (6 ft 3 in)	Bayi Kylin	(China)
SF	10	Lu Wen (C)	26 – 26 February 1990	1.88 m (6 ft 2 in)	Bayi Kylin	(China)
PF	11	Huang Sijing	20 – 8 January 1996	1.90 m (6 ft 3 in)	Guangdong Dolphins	(China)
PF	12	Gao Song	24 – 16 April 1992	1.90 m (6 ft 3 in)	Beijing Great Wall	(China)
F/C	13	Sun Mengran	24 – 16 July 1992	1.95 m (6 ft 5 in)	Bayi Kylin	(China)
C	14	Huang Hongpin	27 – 23 April 1989	1.95 m (6 ft 5 in)	Shanxi Xingrui Flame	(China)
C	15	Chen Nan	33 – 8 January 1983	1.95 m (6 ft 5 in)	Bayi Kylin	(China)

Head coach

- (Australia) Tom Maher

Assistant coach(es)

- (Australia) Michele Timms
- (China) Xu Limin

Legend

- (C) Team captain
- Club – describes last
  club before the tournament
- Age – describes age
  on 6 August 2016

Group play

Pos	Team	Pld	W	L	PF	PA	PD	Pts	Qualification
1	United States	5	5	0	520	316	+204	10	Quarter-finals
2	Spain	5	4	1	387	333	+54	9	Quarter-finals
3	Canada	5	3	2	340	347	−7	8	Quarter-finals
4	Serbia	5	2	3	385	406	−21	7	Quarter-finals
5	China	5	1	4	371	428	−57	6	
6	Senegal	5	0	5	309	482	−173	5	

Source: FIBA
Rules for classification: 1) points; 2) head-to-head points; 3) head-to-head points difference; 4) head-to-head number of points scored.

6 August 2016
14:15

Boxscore

China	68–90	Canada
Scoring by quarter: 9–19, 17–18, 20–23, 22–30
Pts: Chen N. 13; Rebs: Sun Mengr. 5 Asts: Chen X., Sun Mengx. 3		Pts: Tatham 20; Rebs: Gaucher 10; Asts: Gaucher 7

Youth Arena, Rio de Janeiro
Attendance: 2,314
Referees: Juan Carlos García (ESP), Carlos Júlio (ANG), Anne Panther (GER)

8 August 2016
19:45

Boxscore

Senegal	64–101	China
Scoring by quarter: 21–26, 17–21, 15–26, 11–28
Pts: As. Traoré 16; Rebs: Diarra 8 Asts: Dieng 4		Pts: Shao, Sun Mengr. 17; Rebs: Lu 7 Asts: Zhao 6

Youth Arena, Rio de Janeiro
Attendance: 2,907
Referees: Karen Lasuik (CAN), Carlos Júlio (ANG), Chahinaz Boussetta (MAR)

10 August 2016
12:15

Boxscore

China	68–89	Spain
Scoring by quarter: 18–14, 20–27, 21–23, 9–25
Pts: Shao 14; Rebs: Sun Mengr. 8 Asts: Chen 6		Pts: Torrens 32; Rebs: Nicholls 10; Asts: Palau 7

Youth Arena, Rio de Janeiro
Attendance: 1,230
Referees: Eddie Viator (FRA), Leandro Lezcano (ARG), Natalia Cuello (DOM)

12 August 2016
12:15

Boxscore

Serbia	80–72	China
Scoring by quarter: 24–14, 16–20, 26–9, 14–29
Pts: A. Dabović 23; Rebs: Page, Petrović 8 Asts: Petrović 6		Pts: Sun Mengr. 16; Rebs: Huang, Sun Mengr. 7 Asts: three players 3

Youth Arena, Rio de Janeiro
Attendance: 2,219
Referees: Christos Christodoulou (GRE), Natalia Cuello (DOM), Nadege Zouzou (CIV)

14 August 2016
12:15

Boxscore

China	62–105	United States
Scoring by quarter: 9–32, 17–28, 14–18, 22–27
Pts: Sun Mengr. 16; Rebs: Chen X. 6 Asts: Chen X. 6		Pts: Charles, Griner 18; Rebs: Griner 13; Asts: Moore 8

Youth Arena, Rio de Janeiro
Attendance: 2,957
Referees: Ferdinand Pascual (PHI), Robert Lottermoser (GER), Chahinaz Boussetta (MAR)

== Boxing ==
China has entered eleven boxers to compete in each of the following weight classes into the Olympic boxing tournament. Lü Bin and 2012 Olympian Zhang Jiawei became the first Chinese boxers to be selected to the Olympic team with a top two finish of their respective division in the AIBA Pro Boxing series, while Liu Wei earned a box-off victory at the 2015 World Championships to join the Chinese boxing team.

Seven further boxers (four men and three women), including 2012 Olympic silver medalist Ren Cancan, had claimed their Olympic spots at the 2016 Asia & Oceania Qualification Tournament in Qian'an. Meanwhile, Shan Jun secured an additional Olympic place on the Chinese roster at the 2016 AIBA World Qualifying Tournament in Baku, Azerbaijan.

Men

Athlete	Event	Round of 32	Round of 16	Quarterfinals	Semifinals	Final	
Athlete	Event	Opposition Result	Opposition Result	Opposition Result	Opposition Result	Opposition Result	Rank
Lü Bin	Light flyweight	Bye	Warui (KEN); L 1–2	Did not advance			
Hu Jianguan	Flyweight	Eker (TUR); W 2–1	Abgaryan (ARM); W 3–0	Veitía (CUB); W 2–1	Aloyan (RUS); L 0–3	Did not advance	3rd place, bronze medalist(s)
Zhang Jiawei	Bantamweight	Bye	Ham S-m (KOR); W 3–0	Ramírez (CUB); L 0–3	Did not advance		
Shan Jun	Lightweight	Yunusov (TJK); L 0–3	Did not advance				
Hu Qianxun	Light welterweight	Curiel (MEX); W WO	Bachkov (ARM); W 2–1	Dunaytsev (RUS); L 0–3	Did not advance		
Liu Wei	Welterweight	Stanionis (LTU); L 0–3	Did not advance				
Zhao Minggang	Middleweight	Shakhsuvarly (AZE); L 0–3	Did not advance				
Yu Fengkai	Heavyweight	Bye	Levit (KAZ); L TKO	Did not advance			

Women

Athlete	Event	Round of 16	Quarterfinals	Semifinals	Final	
Athlete	Event	Opposition Result	Opposition Result	Opposition Result	Opposition Result	Rank
Ren Cancan	Flyweight	Bye	Bujold (CAN); W 3–0	Adams (GBR); L 0–3	Did not advance	3rd place, bronze medalist(s)
Yin Junhua	Lightweight	Lachgar (MAR); W 3–0	Alekseevna (AZE); W 3–0	Potkonen (FIN); W 3–0	Mossely (FRA); L 1–2	2nd place, silver medalist(s)
Li Qian	Middleweight	Bye	Bandeira (BRA); W 3–0	Fontijn (NED); L 1–2	Did not advance	3rd place, bronze medalist(s)

== Canoeing ==
=== Slalom ===
Chinese canoeists have qualified a maximum of one boat in each of the following classes through the 2015 ICF Canoe Slalom World Championships and the 2016 Asian Championships.

Athlete	Event	Preliminary						Semifinal		Final	
Athlete	Event	Run 1	Rank	Run 2	Rank	Best	Rank	Time	Rank	Time	Rank
Shu Jianming	Men's C-1	110.19	15	100.68	9	100.68	13 Q	108.73	14	Did not advance	
Tan Ya	Men's K-1	100.62	17	101.34	18	100.62	19	Did not advance			
Li Lu	Women's K-1	119.63	16	107.29	11	107.29	13 Q	111.24	13	Did not advance	

=== Sprint ===
Chinese canoeists have qualified one boat in each of the following events through the 2015 ICF Canoe Sprint World Championships. Meanwhile, one additional boat (men's C-1 1000 m) was awarded to the Chinese squad at the 2015 Asian Canoe Sprint Championships in Palembang, Indonesia, as the unused quota spot had been passed to the highest finisher not yet qualified.

Men

Athlete	Event	Heats		Semifinals		Final	
Athlete	Event	Time	Rank	Time	Rank	Time	Rank
Li Qiang	C-1 200 m	41.456	5 Q	40.066	3 FA	40.143	7
Wang Riwei	C-1 1000 m	DNS		Did not advance			

Women

Athlete	Event	Heats		Semifinals		Final	
Athlete	Event	Time	Rank	Time	Rank	Time	Rank
Zhou Yu	K-1 200 m	42.187	4 Q	41.017	5 FB	41.928	11
Zhou Yu	K-1 500 m	1:53.043	1 Q	1:55.311	3 FA	1:54.994	6
Ma Qing; Ren Wenjun	K-2 500 m	1:44.491	2 Q	1:44.780	5 FB	1:51.582	14
Li Yue; Liu Haiping; Ma Qing; Ren Wenjun	K-4 500 m	1:38.730	6 Q	1:37.055	4 FB	1:40.071	11

Qualification Legend: FA = Qualify to final (medal); FB = Qualify to final B (non-medal)

== Cycling ==
=== Track ===
Following the completion of the 2016 UCI Track Cycling World Championships, Chinese riders have accumulated spots in both men's and women's team pursuit, and women's team sprint, as well as the women's omnium. As a result of their place in the women's team sprint, China has won the right to enter two riders in both women's sprint and men's keirin. China failed to win a quota place in the men's team sprint, but earned a single place in the men's sprint by virtue of his final individual UCI Olympic rankings in that event.

The full track cycling team, highlighted by Worlds sprint champion Zhong Tianshi, was named as part of the official team announcement for the Games on July 18, 2016.

Sprint

Athlete	Event	Qualification		Round 1	Repechage 1	Round 2	Repechage 2	Quarterfinals	Semifinals	Final	
Athlete	Event	Time Speed (km/h)	Rank	Opposition Time Speed (km/h)	Opposition Time Speed (km/h)	Opposition Time Speed (km/h)	Opposition Time Speed (km/h)	Opposition Time Speed (km/h)	Opposition Time Speed (km/h)	Opposition Time Speed (km/h)	Rank
Xu Chao	Men's sprint	9.939; 72.441	13	Phillip (TTO); W 10.373; 69.410	Bye	Eilers (GER); L	Puerta (COL); Webster (NZL); W 10.753; 66.958	Skinner (GBR); L, L	Did not advance	5th place final Constable (AUS); Eilers (GER); Baugé (FRA); L	6
Gong Jinjie	Women's sprint	11.068	15 Q	Ligtlee (NED); L	Morton (AUS); Cueff (FRA); L	Did not advance					
Zhong Tianshi	Women's sprint	10.820	5 Q	Welte (GER); W 11.310; 63.660	Bye	Voynova (RUS); L	Meares (AUS); Welte (GER); W 11.557; 62.299	James (GBR); L, L	Did not advance	5th place final Lee W S (HKG); Krupeckaitė (LTU); Voynova (RUS); W 11.197	5

Team sprint

Athlete	Event	Qualification		Semifinals		Final	
Athlete	Event	Time Speed (km/h)	Rank	Opposition Time Speed (km/h)	Rank	Opposition Time Speed (km/h)	Rank
Gong Jinjie; Zhong Tianshi	Women's team sprint	32.305 OR; 55.718	1 Q	Spain; W 31.928 WR; 56.376	1 FA	Russia; W 32.107; 56.062	1st place, gold medalist(s)

Qualification legend: FA=Gold medal final; FB=Bronze medal final

Pursuit

Athlete	Event	Qualification		Semifinals		Final	
Athlete	Event	Time	Rank	Opponent Results	Rank	Opponent Results	Rank
Fan Yang; Liu Hao; Qin Chenlu; Shen Pingan	Men's team pursuit	4:05.152	8 Q	Italy; 4:04.240	8	Switzerland; 4:03.687	8
Huang Dongyan; Jing Yali; Ma Menglu; Zhao Baofang	Women's team pursuit	4:25.246	6 Q	Italy; 4:23.678	7	Poland; WO	7

Keirin

Athlete	Event	1st Round	Repechage	2nd Round	Final
Athlete	Event	Rank	Rank	Rank	Rank
Gong Jinjie	Women's keirin	5 R	3	Did not advance	
Zhong Tianshi	Women's keirin	2 Q	Bye	5	11

Omnium

Athlete	Event	Scratch race		Individual pursuit			Elimination race		Time trial			Flying lap			Points race		Total points	Rank
Athlete	Event	Rank	Points	Time	Rank	Points	Rank	Points	Time	Rank	Points	Time	Rank	Points	Points	Rank	Total points	Rank
Luo Xiaoling	Women's omnium	15	12	3:45.186	15	12	10	22	36.944	15	12	14.740	17	8	2	12	68	15

=== Mountain biking ===
Chinese mountain bikers qualified for one men's and one women's quota place into the Olympic cross-country race, by virtue of a top two national finish, respectively, at the 2015 Asian Championships. These places were awarded to Wang Zhen and Yao Ping.

Athlete	Event	Time	Rank
Wang Zhen	Men's cross-country	LAP (3 laps)	43
Yao Ping	Women's cross-country	1:43:20	24

== Diving ==
Chinese divers qualified for the following individual spots and synchronized teams at the 2016 Olympic Games by having achieved a top three finish from the 2015 FINA World Championships. A total of thirteen divers (six men and seven women), led by London 2012 champions Wu Minxia (springboard) and Chen Ruolin (platform), were named to the Olympic team on May 10, 2016, based on their results in five Olympic trial meets.

Men

Athlete	Event	Preliminaries		Semifinals		Final	
Athlete	Event	Points	Rank	Points	Rank	Points	Rank
Cao Yuan	3 m springboard	498.70	1 Q	489.10	1 Q	547.60	1st place, gold medalist(s)
He Chao	3 m springboard	380.35	21	Did not advance			
Chen Aisen	10 m platform	545.35	3 Q	559.90	1 Q	585.30	1st place, gold medalist(s)
Qiu Bo	10 m platform	564.75	2 Q	504.70	2 Q	488.20	6
Cao Yuan; Qin Kai	3 m synchronized springboard	—N/a				443.70	3rd place, bronze medalist(s)
Chen Aisen; Lin Yue	10 m synchronized platform	—N/a				496.98	1st place, gold medalist(s)

Women

Athlete	Event	Preliminaries		Semifinals		Final	
Athlete	Event	Points	Rank	Points	Rank	Points	Rank
He Zi	3 m springboard	367.05	2 Q	364.05	2 Q	387.90	2nd place, silver medalist(s)
Shi Tingmao	3 m springboard	357.55	3 Q	385.00	1 Q	406.05	1st place, gold medalist(s)
Ren Qian	10 m platform	385.80	2 Q	362.40	3 Q	439.25	1st place, gold medalist(s)
Si Yajie	10 m platform	397.45	1 Q	389.30	1 Q	419.40	2nd place, silver medalist(s)
Shi Tingmao; Wu Minxia	3 m synchronized springboard	—N/a				345.60	1st place, gold medalist(s)
Chen Ruolin; Liu Huixia	10 m synchronized platform	—N/a				354.00	1st place, gold medalist(s)

== Equestrian ==
China has entered one eventing rider into the Olympic equestrian competition by virtue of a top two finish from a combined group of Africa, Middle East, Asia & Oceania in the individual FEI Olympic rankings.

=== Eventing ===
Athlete	Horse	Event	Dressage		Cross-country			Jumping						Total	
Athlete	Horse	Event	Dressage		Cross-country			Qualifier			Final			Total	
Athlete	Horse	Event	Penalties	Rank	Penalties	Total	Rank	Penalties	Total	Rank	Penalties	Total	Rank	Penalties	Rank
Alex Hua Tian	Don Geniro	Individual	42.40	12	13.20	55.60	11	4.00	59.60	8	4.00	63.60	8	63.60	8

== Fencing ==
Chinese fencers have qualified a full squad each in the women's team épée by virtue of their top 4 national finish in the FIE Olympic Team Rankings, while the men's foil team has claimed the spot as the highest ranking team from Asia outside the world's top four.

Foil fencer Le Huilin secured a spot on the Chinese team by finishing among the top 14 in the FIE Adjusted Official Rankings, while Jiao Yunlong (men's épée) and Shen Chen (women's sabre), along with Sun Wei (men's sabre) and Le's teammate Liu Yongshi, did the same feat as one of the two highest-ranked fencers coming from the Asian zone. The fencing team was officially named to the Chinese roster on June 15, 2016, with Lei Sheng aiming to defend the Olympic men's foil title at his third straight Games.

Men

Athlete	Event	Round of 64	Round of 32	Round of 16	Quarterfinal	Semifinal	Final / BM	
Athlete	Event	Opposition Score	Opposition Score	Opposition Score	Opposition Score	Opposition Score	Opposition Score	Rank
Jiao Yunlong	Épée	Melaragno (BRA); W 15–13	Nikishyn (UKR); L 11–15	Did not advance				
Chen Haiwei	Foil	Bye	Halsted (GBR); W 15–9	Ma Jf (CHN); L 12–15	Did not advance			
Lei Sheng	Foil	Bye	Le Péchoux (FRA); L 9–15	Did not advance				
Ma Jianfei	Foil	Bye	Perrier (BRA); W 15–14	Chen Hw (CHN); W 15–12	Safin (RUS); L 7–15	Did not advance		
Chen Haiwei; Lei Sheng; Ma Jianfei; Shi Jialuo	Team foil	—N/a			France; L 42–45	Classification semi-final Brazil; W 43–41	5th place final Great Britain; W 45–38	5
Sun Wei	Sabre	—N/a	Dolniceanu (ROU); L 7–15	Did not advance				

Women

Athlete	Event	Round of 64	Round of 32	Round of 16	Quarterfinal	Semifinal	Final / BM	
Athlete	Event	Opposition Score	Opposition Score	Opposition Score	Opposition Score	Opposition Score	Opposition Score	Rank
Sun Yiwen	Épée	Bye	Sakoa (CIV); W 15–11	Embrich (EST); W 15–12	Besbes (TUN); W 14–11	Fiamingo (ITA); L 11–12	Rembi (FRA); W 15–13	3rd place, bronze medalist(s)
Sun Yujie	Épée	Bye	Kang Y-m (KOR); L 10–15	Did not advance				
Xu Anqi	Épée	Bye	Candassamy (FRA); L 8–15	Did not advance				
Hao Jialu; Sun Yiwen; Sun Yujie; Xu Anqi	Team épée	—N/a		Bye	Ukraine; W 42–34	Estonia; W 45–36	Romania; L 38–44	2nd place, silver medalist(s)
Le Huilin	Foil	Bye	Zekrani (MAR); W 15–4	Thibus (FRA); L 13–15	Did not advance			
Liu Yongshi	Foil	Bye	Knapek (HUN); W 15–9	Kiefer (USA); W 15–9	Di Francisca (ITA); L 10–15	Did not advance		
Shen Chen	Sabre	Bye	Kozaczuk (POL); L 9–15	Did not advance				

== Field hockey ==
Summary

Key:
- FT – After full time.
- P – Match decided by penalty-shootout.

Team	Event	Group Stage						Quarterfinal	Semifinal	Final / BM	
Team	Event	Opposition Score	Opposition Score	Opposition Score	Opposition Score	Opposition Score	Rank	Opposition Score	Opposition Score	Opposition Score	Rank
China women's	Women's tournament	Germany; D 1–1	Spain; W 2–0	Netherlands; L 0–1	South Korea; D 0–0	New Zealand; L 0–3	5	Did not advance			9

=== Women's tournament ===
China women's field hockey team qualified for the Olympics by having achieved a top three finish at the 2014–15 Women's FIH Hockey World League Semifinals.

Team roster

The following is the China roster in the women's field hockey tournament of the 2016 Summer Olympics.

Head coach: Cho Myung-jun

1. Li Dongxiao (GK)
2. Wang Mengyu
5. Li Jiaqi
6. De Jiaojiao
7. Cui Qiuxia (C)
8. Yu Qian
10. Peng Yang
11. Liang Meiyu
12. Wang Na
15. Zhang Jinrong
16. Ou Zixia
17. Li Hongxia
18. Wu Qiong
19. Zhang Xiaoxue
20. Sun Xiao
21. Zhao Yudiao
22. Song Qingling

Reserves:

- Guo Jiajia (GK)

Group play

Pos	Team	Pld	W	D	L	GF	GA	GD	Pts	Qualification
1	Netherlands	5	4	1	0	13	1	+12	13	Quarter-finals
2	New Zealand	5	3	1	1	11	5	+6	10	Quarter-finals
3	Germany	5	2	1	2	6	6	0	7	Quarter-finals
4	Spain	5	2	0	3	6	12	−6	6	Quarter-finals
5	China	5	1	2	2	3	5	−2	5	
6	South Korea	5	0	1	4	3	13	−10	1	

Source: Rio2016
Rules for classification: 1) Points; 2) Matches won; 3) Goal difference; 4) Goals for; 5) Head-to-head result.

7 August 2016
13:30

China	1–1	Germany
Peng 28'	Report	Hahn 5'

Umpires:
Melissa Trivic (AUS)
Sarah Wilson (GBR)

8 August 2016
19:30

Spain	0–2	China
	Report	Zhao 8'; Peng 25'

Umpires:
Amber Church (NZL)
Michelle Meister (GER)

10 August 2016
18:00

China	0–1	Netherlands
	Report	Van Male 59'

Umpires:
Kelly Hudson (NZL)
Carolina de la Fuente (ARG)

12 August 2016
10:00

South Korea	0–0	China
	Report

Umpires:
Irene Presenqui (ARG)
Soledad Iparraguirre (ARG)

13 August 2016
20:30

China	0–3	New Zealand
	Report	Merry 21'; Flynn 41'; McLaren 42'

Umpires:
Amy Baxter (USA)
Kylie Seymour (AUS)

== Football ==
=== Women's tournament ===
China women's football team qualified for the Olympics by virtue of a top two finish at and by progressing to the gold medal match of the 2015–16 AFC Olympic Qualifying Tournament in Japan.

Team roster

Head coach: (France) Bruno Bini

China PR named a squad of 18 players and 4 alternates for the tournament, which was announced on 7 July 2016. Prior to the tournament, Ren Guixin withdrew injured and was replaced on 18 July 2016 by Li Ying, who was initially selected as an alternate player. Wang Yan subsequently filled the vacant alternate spot.

No.	Pos.	Player	Date of birth (age)	Caps	Goals	Club
1	GK	Zhao Lina	18 September 1991 (aged 24)	31	0	(Chinese Football Association) Shanghai Yongbai
2	DF	Liu Shanshan	16 March 1992 (aged 24)	51	0	(Chinese Football Association) Changchun Zhuoyue
3	DF	Xue Jiao	30 January 1993 (aged 23)	26	0	(Chinese Football Association) Dalian Quanjian
4	DF	Gao Chen	11 August 1992 (aged 23)	2	0	(Chinese Football Association) Dalian Quanjian
5	DF	Wu Haiyan	26 February 1993 (aged 23)	63	0	(Chinese Football Association) Shandong Huangming
6	DF	Li Dongna (captain)	6 December 1988 (aged 27)	81	6	(Chinese Football Association) Dalian Quanjian
7	MF	Li Ying	7 January 1993 (aged 23)	80	13	(Chinese Football Association) Shandong Huangming
8	MF	Tan Ruyin	17 July 1994 (aged 22)	39	0	(Chinese Football Association) Changchun Zhuoyue
9	FW	Ma Xiaoxu	5 June 1988 (aged 28)	147	61	(Chinese Football Association) Dalian Quanjian
10	FW	Yang Li	31 January 1991 (aged 25)	33	17	(Chinese Football Association) Jiangsu Suning
11	FW	Wang Shanshan	27 January 1990 (aged 26)	70	9	(Chinese Football Association) Tianjin Huisen
12	FW	Wang Shuang	23 January 1995 (aged 21)	44	6	(Chinese Football Association) Dalian Quanjian
13	MF	Pang Fengyue	19 January 1989 (aged 27)	80	6	(Chinese Football Association) Dalian Quanjian
14	DF	Zhao Rong	2 August 1991 (aged 25)	52	0	(Chinese Football Association) Changchun Zhuoyue
15	MF	Zhang Rui	17 January 1989 (aged 27)	91	17	(Chinese Football Association) People's Liberation Army
16	MF	Yang Man	2 November 1995 (aged 20)	16	1	(Chinese Football Association) Shandong Ladies
17	FW	Gu Yasha	28 November 1990 (aged 25)	118	10	(Chinese Football Association) Beijing BG
18	GK	Zhang Yue	30 September 1990 (aged 25)	49	0	(Chinese Football Association) Beijing BG

Group play

Pos	Team	Pld	W	D	L	GF	GA	GD	Pts	Qualification
1	Brazil (H)	3	2	1	0	8	1	+7	7	Quarter-finals
2	China	3	1	1	1	2	3	−1	4	Quarter-finals
3	Sweden	3	1	1	1	2	5	−3	4	Quarter-finals
4	South Africa	3	0	1	2	0	3	−3	1	

Source: Rio2016 & FIFA
Rules for classification: Tiebreakers
(H) Hosts
3 August 2016
16:00

Brazil	3–0	China
Mônica 36'; Andressa 59'; Cristiane 90'	Report (Rio2016); Report (FIFA)

Estádio Olímpico João Havelange, Rio de Janeiro
Attendance: 27,618
Referee: Carol Chenard (Canada)

6 August 2016
19:00

South Africa	0–2	China
	Report (Rio2016); Report (FIFA)	Gu Yasha 45+1'; Tan Ruyin 87'

Estádio Olímpico João Havelange, Rio de Janeiro
Attendance: 25,000
Referee: Esther Staubli (Switzerland)

9 August 2016
22:00

China	0–0	Sweden
	Report (Rio2016); Report (FIFA); Report

Estádio Nacional Mané Garrincha, Brasília
Attendance: 7,648
Referee: Olga Miranda (Paraguay)

Quarterfinal

12 August 2016
16:00

China	0–1	Germany
	Report (Rio2016); Report (FIFA)	Behringer 76'

Itaipava Arena Fonte Nova, Salvador
Attendance: 9,642
Referee: Kateryna Monzul (Ukraine)

== Golf ==
China has entered four golfers (two per gender) into the Olympic tournament. Li Haotong (world no. 141), Wu Ashun (world no. 129), Feng Shanshan (world no. 13) and Lin Xiyu (world no. 50) qualified directly among the top 60 eligible players for their respective individual events based on the IGF World Rankings as of 11 July 2016.

Athlete	Event	Round 1	Round 2	Round 3	Round 4	Total		
Athlete	Event	Score	Score	Score	Score	Score	Par	Rank
Li Haotong	Men's	70	73	71	75	289	+5	=50
Wu Ashun	Men's	74	71	70	68	283	−1	=30
Feng Shanshan	Women's	70	67	68	69	274	−10	3rd place, bronze medalist(s)
Lin Xiyu	Women's	72	74	74	69	289	+5	38

== Gymnastics ==
=== Artistic ===
China fielded a full squad of five gymnasts in both the men's and women's artistic gymnastics events through a top eight finish each in the team all-around at the 2015 World Artistic Gymnastics Championships in Glasgow. The men's and women's gymnastics squads, led by London 2012 team champion Zhang Chenglong, were named to the Olympic roster at the conclusion of the Chinese Championships in Beijing on May 16, 2016. Notable absence in the roster was five-time Olympic medalist Zou Kai.

Men
Team

Athlete	Event	Qualification								Final							
Athlete	Event	Apparatus						Total	Rank	Apparatus						Total	Rank
Athlete	Event	F	PH	R	V	PB	HB	Total	Rank	F	PH	R	V	PB	HB	Total	Rank
Deng Shudi	Team	15.033	14.866	14.300	15.300	15.800 Q	14.366	89.665	4 Q	13.833	14.958	14.600	15.200	15.800	14.400	—N/a	
Lin Chaopan	Team	13.666	15.033	14.133	15.233	15.700	14.866	88.631	10 Q	14.833	14.900	—N/a	14.400	15.900	15.000	—N/a	
Liu Yang	Team	12.933	—N/a	15.900 Q	14.683	—N/a				—N/a		15.833	—N/a			—N/a	
You Hao	Team	—N/a	14.966	15.800 Q	—N/a	15.733 Q	14.066	—N/a		—N/a	14.400	14.800	—N/a	16.166	—N/a	—N/a	
Zhang Chenglong	Team	14.900	—N/a	—N/a	14.933	15.166	13.966	—N/a		15.133	—N/a		15.400	—N/a	15.566	—N/a	
Total	Team	43.599	44.865	46.000	45.466	47.233	43.298	270.461	1 Q	43.799	44.258	45.233	45.000	47.866	44.966	271.122	3rd place, bronze medalist(s)

Individual finals

Athlete	Event	Apparatus						Total	Rank
Athlete	Event	F	PH	R	V	PB	HB	Total	Rank
Deng Shudi	All-around	14.966	14.533	14.433	15.266	15.966	14.966	90.130	6
Deng Shudi	Parallel bars	—N/a				15.766	—N/a	15.766	4
Lin Chaopan	All-around	14.866	14.833	14.733	14.966	15.666	15.166	90.230	5
Liu Yang	Rings	—N/a		15.600	—N/a			15.600	4
You Hao	Rings	—N/a		15.400	—N/a			15.400	6
You Hao	Parallel bars	—N/a				14.833	—N/a	14.833	8

Women
Team

Athlete	Event	Qualification						Final					
Athlete	Event	Apparatus				Total	Rank	Apparatus				Total	Rank
Athlete	Event	V	UB	BB	F	Total	Rank	V	UB	BB	F	Total	Rank
Fan Yilin	Team	—N/a	15.266	14.866 Q	13.500	—N/a		—N/a	15.733	15.066	—N/a	—N/a	
Mao Yi	Team	14.816	—N/a		11.700	—N/a		14.833	—N/a		12.633	—N/a	
Shang Chunsong	Team	12.766	15.300 Q	14.366	14.100	56.532	20 Q	—N/a	14.333	15.066	14.700	—N/a	
Tan Jiaxin	Team	14.766	14.600	—N/a				14.766	14.941	—N/a		—N/a	
Wang Yan	Team	14.933 Q	13.900	14.100	14.666 Q	57.599	6 Q	14.733	—N/a	14.466	14.733	—N/a	
Total	Team	44.515	45.166	43.332	42.266	175.279	2 Q	44.332	45.007	44.598	42.066	176.003	3rd place, bronze medalist(s)

Individual finals

Athlete	Event	Apparatus				Total	Rank
Athlete	Event	V	UB	BB	F	Total	Rank
Fan Yilin	Balance beam	—N/a		14.500	—N/a	14.500	6
Shang Chunsong	All-around	13.883	15.233	14.833	14.600	58.549	4
Shang Chunsong	Uneven bars	—N/a	15.433	—N/a		15.433	5
Wang Yan	All-around	14.733	13.733	14.666	14.900	58.032	6
Wang Yan	Vault	14.999	—N/a			14.999	5
Wang Yan	Floor	—N/a			14.666	14.666	5

* Liu Tingting was recently replaced by Tan Jiaxin because of a hand injury while training a pac salto on the uneven bars.

=== Rhythmic ===
China has qualified a squad of rhythmic gymnasts for the group all-around by finishing in the top 10 (for group) at the 2015 World Championships in Stuttgart, Germany. Meanwhile, an additional Olympic berth had been awarded to the Chinese female gymnast, who participated in the individual all-around at the Olympic Test Event in Rio de Janeiro.

Athlete	Event	Qualification						Final					
Athlete	Event	Hoop	Ball	Clubs	Ribbon	Total	Rank	Hoop	Ball	Clubs	Ribbon	Total	Rank
Shang Rong	Individual	16.566	16.766	15.716	15.966	65.014	24	Did not advance					

Athlete	Event	Qualification				Final			
Athlete	Event	5 ribbons	3 clubs 2 hoops	Total	Rank	5 ribbons	3 clubs 2 hoops	Total	Rank
Bao Yuqing; Shu Siyao; Yang Ye; Zhang Ling; Zhao Jingnan	Team	16.333	15.800	32.133	11	Did not advance			

=== Trampoline ===
China has qualified a full squad of two gymnasts each in both men's and women's trampoline by virtue of a top eight finish at the 2015 World Championships in Odense, Denmark.

Athlete	Event	Qualification		Final	
Athlete	Event	Score	Rank	Score	Rank
Dong Dong	Men's	110.050	3 Q	60.535	2nd place, silver medalist(s)
Gao Lei	Men's	112.535	1 Q	60.175	3rd place, bronze medalist(s)
He Wenna	Women's	103.095	4 Q	55.570	4
Li Dan	Women's	104.075	2 Q	55.885	3rd place, bronze medalist(s)

== Judo ==
China has qualified a total of eight judokas for each of the following weight classes at the Games. Seven of them (three men and four women) were ranked among the top 22 eligible judokas for men and top 14 for women in the IJF World Ranking List of May 30, 2016, while Zhou Chao at women's middleweight (70 kg) earned a continental quota spot from the Asian region as the highest-ranked Chinese judoka outside of direct qualifying position.

Men

Athlete	Event	Round of 64	Round of 32	Round of 16	Quarterfinals	Semifinals	Repechage	Final / BM	
Athlete	Event	Opposition Result	Opposition Result	Opposition Result	Opposition Result	Opposition Result	Opposition Result	Opposition Result	Rank
Ma Duanbin	−66 kg	Bye	Houssein (DJI); W 011–000	Ebinuma (JPN); L 000–011	Did not advance				
Sai Yinjirigala	−73 kg	Bye	Pombo (BRA); W 001–000	Iartcev (RUS); L 000–100	Did not advance				
Cheng Xunzhao	−90 kg	Bye	Iliadis (GRE); W 100–000	Tóth (HUN); W 100–000	Nyman (SWE); W 100–000	Baker (JPN); L 000–100	Bye	Lkhagvasüren (MGL); W 001–000	3rd place, bronze medalist(s)

Women

Athlete	Event	Round of 32	Round of 16	Quarterfinals	Semifinals	Repechage	Final / BM	
Athlete	Event	Opposition Result	Opposition Result	Opposition Result	Opposition Result	Opposition Result	Opposition Result	Rank
Ma Yingnan	−52 kg	Bye	Ramos (POR); W 100–000	Miranda (BRA); W 010–000	Giuffrida (ITA); L 000–000 S	Bye	Kuziutina (RUS); L 000–100	5
Yang Junxia	−63 kg	Urdabayeva (KAZ); W 100–000	Tsedevsüren (MGL); W 100–001	Trstenjak (SLO); L 000–101	Did not advance	Gerbi (ISR); L 000–010	Did not advance	7
Zhou Chao	−70 kg	Tachimoto (JPN); L 000–100	Did not advance					
Zhang Zhehui	−78 kg	Bye	Harrison (USA); L 000–100	Did not advance				
Yu Song	+78 kg	Bye	Asselah (ALG); W 100–000	Sayit (TUR); W 111–000	Andéol (FRA); L 000–100	Bye	Kim M-j (KOR); W 100–000	3rd place, bronze medalist(s)

== Modern pentathlon ==
China has qualified a total of four modern pentathletes for the following events at the Games. London 2012 silver medalist Cao Zhongrong, fifth-place finalist Chen Qian, and rookies Su Haihang, and Liang Wanxia had claimed their Olympic spots at the 2015 Asia & Oceania Championships. Guo Jianli and Zhang Xiaonan became the third Chinese athlete in their respective events to qualify for Rio, as a result of their world ranking at the end of May 2016. With the rookies failing to guarantee their selection at the 2016 World Championships, the choice of four modern pentathletes going to the Games was determined by the NOC before the team was named on June 15; in the event, the Chinese team had decided to keep their Olympic veterans instead, along with Guo and Zhang.

Athlete	Event	Fencing (épée one touch)				Swimming (200 m freestyle)			Riding (show jumping)			Combined: shooting/running (10 m air pistol)/(3200 m)			Total points	Final rank
Athlete	Event	RR	BR	Rank	MP points	Time	Rank	MP points	Penalties	Rank	MP points	Time	Rank	MP Points	Total points	Final rank
Cao Zhongrong	Men's	17–18	2	22	204	2:00.08	5	340	0	4	300	11:51.14	28	589	1433	16
Guo Jianli	Men's	19–16	0	17	214	2:01.94	10	335	14	15	286	11:45.98	27	595	1430	18
Chen Qian	Women's	22–13	0	5	232	2:18.75	20	284	8	13	292	12:45.07	9	535	1343	4
Zhang Xiaonan	Women's	22–13	2	6	232	2:22.67	33	272	21	21	279	13:20.79	26	500	1285	18

== Rowing ==
China has qualified five boats for each of the following rowing classes into the Olympic regatta. Four rowing crews had confirmed Olympic places for their boats each in the men's lightweight four, and all small-boat classes for women (except coxless pair) at the 2015 FISA World Championships in Lac d'Aiguebelette, France, while the men's lightweight double sculls rowers had added one boat to the Chinese roster as a result of their gold medal triumph at the 2016 Asia & Oceania Continental Qualification Regatta in Chungju, South Korea.

Two further boats was awarded to the Chinese rowers, who finished among the top four crews each in the women's pair and quadruple sculls at the 2016 European & Final Qualification Regatta in Lucerne, Switzerland.

Men

Athlete	Event	Heats		Repechage		Semifinals		Final	
Athlete	Event	Time	Rank	Time	Rank	Time	Rank	Time	Rank
Sun Man; Wang Chunxin	Lightweight double sculls	6:30.83	4 R	7:03.88	2 SA/B	7:01.49	6 FB	6:40.74	11
Jin Wei; Wang Tiexin; Yu Chenggang; Zhao Jingbin	Lightweight four	6:03.43	2 SA/B	Bye		6:27.27	5 FB	6:32.78	8

Women

Athlete	Event	Heats		Repechage		Quarterfinals		Semifinals		Final	
Athlete	Event	Time	Rank	Time	Rank	Time	Rank	Time	Rank	Time	Rank
Duan Jingli	Single sculls	8:18.57	1 QF	Bye		7:27.88	2 SA/B	7:43.97	1 FA	7:24.13	3rd place, bronze medalist(s)
Miao Tian; Zhang Min	Pair	7:15.66	3 SA/B	Bye		—N/a		7:30.90	4 FB	7:17.12	7
Lü Yang; Zhu Weiwei	Double sculls	7:25.19	2 SA/B	Bye		—N/a		7:05.31	6 FB	7:45.68	11
Huang Wenyi; Pan Feihong	Lightweight double sculls	7:00.13	1 SA/B	Bye		—N/a		7:20.94	3 FA	7:06.49	3rd place, bronze medalist(s)
Jiang Yan; Wang Yuwei; Zhang Ling; Zhang Xinyue	Quadruple sculls	6:40.21	4 R	6:28.49	3 FA	—N/a				6:59.45	6

Qualification Legend: FA=Final A (medal); FB=Final B (non-medal); FC=Final C (non-medal); FD=Final D (non-medal); FE=Final E (non-medal); FF=Final F (non-medal); SA/B=Semifinals A/B; SC/D=Semifinals C/D; SE/F=Semifinals E/F; QF=Quarterfinals; R=Repechage

== Sailing ==
Chinese sailors have qualified one boat in each of the following classes through the 2014 ISAF Sailing World Championships, the individual fleet Worlds, and Asian qualifying regattas. A total of eight sailors, led by two-time Olympian and defending Laser Radial champion Xu Lijia, had been selected to the Chinese Olympic team for Rio 2016, following the completion of the ISAF World Cup meet (April 26 to May 1) in Hyères, France.

Men

Athlete	Event	Race													Net points	Final rank
Athlete	Event	1	2	3	4	5	6	7	8	9	10	11	12	M*	Net points	Final rank
Wang Aichen	RS:X	16	18	8	18	~~19~~	16	6	4	15	10	10	15	EL	135	13
Gong Lei	Finn	22	~~DNF~~	20	16	21	20	19	22	21	17	—N/a		EL	178	22
Wang Wei; Xu Zangjun	470	~~23~~	12	13	22	19	11	19	15	19	12	—N/a		EL	142	18

Women

Athlete	Event	Race													Net points	Final rank
Athlete	Event	1	2	3	4	5	6	7	8	9	10	11	12	M*	Net points	Final rank
Chen Peina	RS:X	9	11	11	~~15~~	7	1	4	10	4	1	1	1	6	60	2nd place, silver medalist(s)
Xu Lijia	Laser Radial	3	~~DSQ~~	3	1	8	12	DSQ	DSQ	19	13	—N/a		EL	135	18
Huang Lizhu; Wang Xiaoli	470	12	10	14	13	~~16~~	16	17	13	4	16	—N/a		EL	113	16

M = Medal race; EL = Eliminated – did not advance into the medal race

== Shooting ==
Chinese shooters have achieved quota places for the following events by virtue of their best finishes at the 2014 ISSF World Shooting Championships, the 2015 ISSF World Cup series, and Asian Championships, as long as they obtained a minimum qualifying score (MQS) by March 31, 2016. To assure their nomination to the Olympic team, shooters must finish in the top two of each individual event at the Olympic Trials for rifle & pistol (March 20 to 29) in Beijing.

The rifle and pistol shooting team was announced on March 31, 2016, featuring Olympic champions Yi Siling, Guo Wenjun, married couple Pang Wei and Du Li, and upcoming four-time Olympians Zhu Qinan and Chen Ying. The shotgun team, led by Olympic medalists Hu Binyuan (men's double trap) and Wei Ning (women's skeet), rounded out the Chinese roster at the Olympic Trials on May 13, 2016.

Men

Athlete	Event	Qualification		Semifinal		Final / BM	
Athlete	Event	Points	Rank	Points	Rank	Points	Rank
Cao Yifei	10 m air rifle	625.5	9	—N/a		Did not advance	
Cao Yifei	50 m rifle prone	620.8	30	—N/a		Did not advance	
Hu Binyuan	Double trap	135 (+7)	8	Did not advance			
Hui Zicheng	50 m rifle 3 positions	1171	15	—N/a		Did not advance	
Li Yuehong	25 m rapid fire pistol	584	5 Q	—N/a		27	3rd place, bronze medalist(s)
Pan Qiang	Double trap	133	12	Did not advance			
Pang Wei	10 m air pistol	590	1 Q	—N/a		180.4	3rd place, bronze medalist(s)
Pang Wei	50 m pistol	565	2 Q	—N/a		67.2	8
Pu Qifeng	10 m air pistol	577	16	—N/a		Did not advance	
Wang Zhiwei	50 m pistol	556	8 Q	—N/a		129.4	5
Yang Haoran	10 m air rifle	620.5	31	—N/a		Did not advance	
Zhang Fusheng	25 m rapid fire pistol	590	2 Q	—N/a		21	4
Zhao Shengbo	50 m rifle prone	618.7	38	—N/a		Did not advance	
Zhu Qinan	50 m rifle 3 positions	1176	4 Q	—N/a		414.8	6

Women

Athlete	Event	Qualification		Semifinal		Final / BM	
Athlete	Event	Points	Rank	Points	Rank	Points	Rank
Chen Fang	Trap	64	15	Did not advance			
Chen Ying	25 m pistol	570	30	Did not advance			
Du Li	10 m air rifle	420.7 OR	1 Q	—N/a		207.0	2nd place, silver medalist(s)
Du Li	50 m rifle 3 positions	586	4 Q	—N/a		447.4	3rd place, bronze medalist(s)
Guo Wenjun	10 m air pistol	378	30	—N/a		Did not advance	
Wei Meng	Skeet	73	1 Q	14	3 q	15 (+6)	4
Wei Ning	Skeet	68	9	Did not advance			
Yi Siling	10 m air rifle	415.9	8 Q	—N/a		185.4	3rd place, bronze medalist(s)
Zhang Binbin	50 m rifle 3 positions	582	7 Q	—N/a		458.4	2nd place, silver medalist(s)
Zhang Jingjing	25 m pistol	592 OR	1 Q	17	3 q	4	4
Zhang Mengxue	10 m air pistol	384	7 Q	—N/a		199.4	1st place, gold medalist(s)

Qualification Legend: Q = Qualify for the next round; q = Qualify for the bronze medal (shotgun)

== Swimming ==
Chinese swimmers have so far achieved qualifying standards in the following events (up to a maximum of 2 swimmers in each event at the Olympic Qualifying Time (OQT), and potentially 1 at the Olympic Selection Time (OST)): To assure their selection to the Olympic team, swimmers must finish in the top two of each individual pool events under the Olympic qualifying cut at the Chinese National Championships & Olympic Trials (April 3 to 10) in Foshan and the Summer Championships (June 6 to 9) in Ganzhou.

A total of 45 swimmers (19 men and 26 women) were officially named to the Chinese roster at the end of the qualifying period on July 3, 2016, featuring double Olympic gold medalists Sun Yang and Ye Shiwen, and freestyle sprinter and 2015 Worlds champion Ning Zetao.

Men

Athlete	Event	Heat		Semifinal		Final	
Athlete	Event	Time	Rank	Time	Rank	Time	Rank
Hu Yixuan	200 m individual medley	2:00.70	22	Did not advance			
Li Guangyuan	100 m backstroke	54.36	21	Did not advance			
Li Guangyuan	200 m backstroke	1:56.85	11 Q	1:55.92	6 Q	1:55.89	6
Li Xiang	100 m breaststroke	59.55	11 Q	1:00.25	13	Did not advance	
Li Xiang	200 m breaststroke	2:10.17	13 Q	2:10.92	12	Did not advance	
Li Zhuhao	100 m butterfly	51.78	=8 Q	51.51	3 Q	51.26	5
Li Zhuhao	200 m butterfly	1:56.72	16 Q	1:57.62	16	Did not advance	
Mao Feilian	200 m breaststroke	2:09.80	9 Q	2:09.64	9	Did not advance	
Ning Zetao	50 m freestyle	22.38	30	Did not advance			
Ning Zetao	100 m freestyle	48.57	=14 Q	48.37	12	Did not advance	
Qiu Ziao	400 m freestyle	3:49.45	26	—N/a		Did not advance	
Qiu Ziao	1500 m freestyle	15:06.71	20	—N/a		Did not advance	
Shang Keyuan	200 m freestyle	1:48.46	32	Did not advance			
Sun Yang	200 m freestyle	1:45.75	1 Q	1:44.63	1 Q	1:44.65	1st place, gold medalist(s)
Sun Yang	400 m freestyle	3:44.23	4 Q	—N/a		3:41.68	2nd place, silver medalist(s)
Sun Yang	1500 m freestyle	15:01.97	16	—N/a		Did not advance	
Wang Shun	200 m individual medley	1:58.98	8 Q	1:58.12	6 Q	1:57.05	3rd place, bronze medalist(s)
Wang Shun	400 m individual medley	4:14.46	10	—N/a		Did not advance	
Wu Yuhang	200 m butterfly	1:59.04	27	Did not advance			
Xu Jiayu	100 m backstroke	53.01	2 Q	52.73	5 Q	52.31	2nd place, silver medalist(s)
Xu Jiayu	200 m backstroke	1:55.51	2 Q	1:55.66	5 Q	1:55.16	4
Yan Zibei	100 m breaststroke	1:00.88	=27	Did not advance			
Yu Hexin	50 m freestyle	22.20	20	Did not advance			
Yu Hexin	100 m freestyle	48.87	25	Did not advance			
Zhang Qibin	100 m butterfly	52.84	27	Did not advance			
Zu Lijun	10 km open water	—N/a				1:53:02.0	4
He Jianbin; Lin Yongqing; Ning Zetao; Yu Hexin	4 × 100 m freestyle relay	DSQ		—N/a		Did not advance	
Li Xiang; Li Zhuhao; Ning Zetao; Xu Jiayu	4 × 100 m medley relay	3:32.57	=4 Q	—N/a		DSQ	

Women

Athlete	Event	Heat		Semifinal		Final	
Athlete	Event	Time	Rank	Time	Rank	Time	Rank
Ai Yanhan	200 m freestyle	1:56.77	8 Q	1:57.41	11	Did not advance	
Cao Yue	400 m freestyle	4:19.57	28	—N/a		Did not advance	
Chen Jie	200 m backstroke	2:14.18	27	Did not advance			
Chen Xinyi	50 m freestyle	DNS		Did not advance			
Chen Xinyi	100 m butterfly	57.17	7 Q	57.51	8 Q	56.72	4
Fu Yuanhui	100 m backstroke	1:00.02	9 Q	58.95	3 Q	58.76	3rd place, bronze medalist(s)
Hou Yawen	800 m freestyle	8:30.59	11	—N/a		Did not advance	
Liu Xiang	50 m freestyle	24.91	=18	Did not advance			
Liu Yaxin	200 m backstroke	2:08.84	6 Q	2:07.56	4 Q	2:09.03	7
Lu Ying	100 m butterfly	57.08	5 Q	57.15	6 Q	56.76	5
Shen Duo	100 m freestyle	54.41	15 Q	DNS		Did not advance	
Shen Duo	200 m freestyle	1:56.52	6 Q	1:56.03	4 Q	1:55.25	5
Shi Jinglin	100 m breaststroke	1:06.55	5 Q	1:06.31	3 Q	1:06.37	4
Shi Jinglin	200 m breaststroke	2:24.33	9 Q	2:22.37	4 Q	2:22.28	3rd place, bronze medalist(s)
Wang Xueer	100 m backstroke	1:00.59	14 Q	1:01.44	16	Did not advance	
Xin Xin	10 km open water	—N/a				1:57:14.4	4
Ye Shiwen	200 m individual medley	2:10.56	7 Q	2:09.33	4 Q	2:13.56	8
Ye Shiwen	400 m individual medley	4:45.86	27	—N/a		Did not advance	
Yu Jingyao	200 m breaststroke	2:28.65	24	Did not advance			
Zhang Xinyu	100 m breaststroke	1:07.59	22	Did not advance			
Zhang Yufei	200 m butterfly	2:07.55	8 Q	2:06.95	5 Q	2:07.40	6
Zhang Yuhan	400 m freestyle	4:06.30	9	—N/a		Did not advance	
Zhang Yuhan	800 m freestyle	8:35.32	18	—N/a		Did not advance	
Zhou Min	200 m individual medley	2:14.81	23	Did not advance			
Zhou Min	400 m individual medley	4:50.38	32	—N/a		Did not advance	
Zhou Yilin	200 m butterfly	2:08.21	12 Q	2:06.52	3 Q	2:07.37	5
Zhu Menghui	100 m freestyle	54.15	11 Q	53.98	9	Did not advance	
Shen Duo; Sun Meichen; Tang Yi; Tang Yuting; Zhu Menghui	4 × 100 m freestyle relay	3:37.25	9	—N/a		Did not advance	
Ai Yanhan; Dong Jie; Shen Duo; Wang Shijia; Zhang Yuhan	4 × 200 m freestyle relay	7:49.58	3 Q	—N/a		7:47.96	4
Lu Ying; Fu Yuanhui; Shen Duo; Shi Jinglin	4 × 100 m medley relay	3:58.23	6 Q	—N/a		3:55.18	4

== Synchronized swimming ==
China has fielded a squad of nine synchronized swimmers to compete in the women's duet and team events, by virtue of their top national finish for Asia at the 2015 FINA World Championships.

Athlete	Event	Technical routine		Free routine (preliminary)			Free routine (final)		
Athlete	Event	Points	Rank	Points	Total (technical + free)	Rank	Points	Total (technical + free)	Rank
Huang Xuechen; Sun Wenyan	Duet	95.3688	2	96.0667	191.4355	2 Q	97.0000	192.3688	2nd place, silver medalist(s)
Gu Xiao; Guo Li; Huang Xuechen; Li Xiaolu; Liang Xinping; Sun Wenyan; Tang Mengni; Yin Chengxin; Zeng Zhen	Team	95.6174	2	—N/a			97.3667	192.9841	2nd place, silver medalist(s)

== Table tennis ==
China has fielded a team of six athletes into the table tennis competition at the Games. London 2012 champions Ma Long and Li Xiaoxia secured the Olympic spot each in the men's and women's singles as the highest-ranked player coming from the East Asia zone at the Asian Qualification Tournament in Hong Kong. Meanwhile, 2015 World champion Ding Ning and reigning Olympic champion Zhang Jike were automatically selected among the top 22 eligible players each in their respective singles events based on the ITTF Olympic Rankings.

Xu Xin and world no. 1 seed Liu Shiwen were each awarded the third spot to build the men's and women's teams for the Games as the top Asian nation, respectively, in the ITTF Olympic Rankings.

Men

Athlete	Event	Preliminary	Round 1	Round 2	Round 3	Round of 16	Quarterfinals	Semifinals	Final / BM	
Athlete	Event	Opposition Result	Opposition Result	Opposition Result	Opposition Result	Opposition Result	Opposition Result	Opposition Result	Opposition Result	Rank
Ma Long	Singles	Bye			Groth (DEN); W 4–0	Jung Y-s (KOR); W 4–2	Aruna (NGR); W 4–0	Mizutani (JPN); W 4–2	Zhang Jk (CHN); W 4–0	1st place, gold medalist(s)
Zhang Jike	Singles	Bye			Chen C-a (TPE); W 4–0	Crișan (ROU); W 4–0	Niwa (JPN); W 4–1	Samsonov (BLR); W 4–1	Ma L (CHN); L 0–4	2nd place, silver medalist(s)
Ma Long; Xu Xin; Zhang Jike	Team	—N/a				Nigeria; W 3–0	Great Britain; W 3–0	South Korea; W 3–0	Japan; W 3–1	1st place, gold medalist(s)

Women

Athlete	Event	Preliminary	Round 1	Round 2	Round 3	Round of 16	Quarterfinals	Semifinals	Final / BM	
Athlete	Event	Opposition Result	Opposition Result	Opposition Result	Opposition Result	Opposition Result	Opposition Result	Opposition Result	Opposition Result	Rank
Ding Ning	Singles	Bye			Samara (ROU); W 4–0	Doo H K (HKG); W 4–0	Han Y (GER); W 4–0	Kim S-i (PRK); W 4–1	Li Xx (CHN); W 4–3	1st place, gold medalist(s)
Li Xiaoxia	Singles	Bye			Li F (SWE); W 4–0	Lee H C (HKG); W 4–0	Cheng I-c (TPE); W 4–0	Fukuhara (JPN); W 4–0	Ding N (CHN); L 3–4	2nd place, silver medalist(s)
Ding Ning; Li Xiaoxia; Liu Shiwen	Team	—N/a				Brazil; W 3–0	North Korea; W 3–0	Singapore; W 3–0	Germany; W 3–0	1st place, gold medalist(s)

== Taekwondo ==
China entered four athletes into the taekwondo competition at the Olympics. Zheng Shuyin and two-time Olympic flyweight champion Wu Jingyu qualified automatically for their respective weight classes by finishing in the top 6 WTF Olympic rankings. Meanwhile, Zhao Shuai and Qiao Sen secured the remaining spots on the Chinese team by virtue of their top two finish in the men's flyweight (58 kg) and men's heavyweight category (+80 kg), respectively, at the 2016 Asian Qualification Tournament in Manila, Philippines.

Athlete	Event	Round of 16	Quarterfinals	Semifinals	Repechage	Final / BM	
Athlete	Event	Opposition Result	Opposition Result	Opposition Result	Opposition Result	Opposition Result	Rank
Zhao Shuai	Men's −58 kg	Tortosa (ESP); W 7–3	Hajjami (MAR); W 8–1	Navarro (MEX); W 9–4	Bye	Hanprab (THA); W 6–4	1st place, gold medalist(s)
Qiao Sen	Men's +80 kg	Shokin (UZB); L 8–15	Did not advance				11
Wu Jingyu	Women's −49 kg	Huang H-h (TPE); W 10–1	Bogdanović (SRB); L 7–17	Did not advance	Abakarova (AZE); L 3–4	Did not advance	7
Zheng Shuyin	Women's +67 kg	Rawal (NEP); W 2–0	Épangue (FRA); W 4–1	Walkden (GBR); W 4–1 SUD	Bye	Espinoza (MEX); W 5–1	1st place, gold medalist(s)

== Tennis ==
China has entered five tennis players into the Olympic tournament. Peng Shuai (world no. 265) and Zhang Shuai (world no. 62) qualified directly for the women's singles, as two of the top 56 eligible players in the WTA World Rankings as of June 6, 2016. Meanwhile, rookies Xu Yifan and Zheng Saisai were added to the Olympic tennis team, as China's top-ranked pair outside of direct qualifying position in the women's doubles.

Following the withdrawal of several tennis players from the Games, Wang Qiang (world no. 73) and Zheng (world no. 86) received spare ITF Olympic places to join Peng and Zhang in the women's singles.

Athlete	Event	Round of 64	Round of 32	Round of 16	Quarterfinals	Semifinals	Final / BM	
Athlete	Event	Opposition Result	Opposition Result	Opposition Result	Opposition Result	Opposition Result	Opposition Result	Rank
Peng Shuai	Women's singles	Watson (GBR); L 4–6, 7–6^{(7–5)}, 3–6	Did not advance					
Wang Qiang	Women's singles	Kuznetsova (RUS); L 1–6, 6–4, 0–6	Did not advance					
Zhang Shuai	Women's singles	Bacsinszky (SUI); W 6–7^{(4–7)}, 6–4, 7–6^{(9–7)}	Siegemund (GER); L 2–6, 4–6	Did not advance				
Zheng Saisai	Women's singles	Radwańska (POL); W 6–4, 7–5	Kasatkina (RUS); L 1–6, 4–6	Did not advance				
Peng Shuai; Zhang Shuai	Women's doubles	—N/a	Mirza / Thombare (IND); W 7–6^{(8–6)}, 5–7, 7–5	Hlaváčková / Hradecká (CZE); L 4–6, 4–6	Did not advance			
Xu Yifan; Zheng Saisai	Women's doubles	—N/a	L Kichenok / N Kichenok (UKR); W 6–0, 6–3	Errani / Vinci (ITA); L 2–6, 3–6	Did not advance			

== Triathlon ==
China has entered two triathletes to compete at the Games. London 2012 Olympian Bai Faquan and Wang Lianyuan were each selected as the highest-ranked triathlete from Asia in the men's and women's event, respectively, based on the ITU Points List.

Athlete	Event	Swim (1.5 km)	Trans 1	Bike (40 km)	Trans 2	Run (10 km)	Total Time	Rank
Bai Faquan	Men's	17:31	0:49	59:49	0:37	39:22	1:58:08	50
Wang Lianyuan	Women's	20:06	0:57	1:05:55	0:42	43:32	2:11:12	48

== Volleyball ==
=== Beach ===
China women's beach volleyball team qualified directly for the Olympics by virtue of their nation's top 15 placement in the FIVB Olympic Rankings as of June 13, 2016. The place was awarded to rookies Wang Fan and Yue Yuan.

Athlete	Event	Preliminary round	Standing	Round of 16	Quarterfinals	Semifinals	Final / BM	
Athlete	Event	Opposition Score	Standing	Opposition Score	Opposition Score	Opposition Score	Opposition Score	Rank
Wang Fan; Yue Yuan	Women's	Pool C Forrer – Vergé-Dépré (SUI); W 2 – 1 (24–22, 18–21, 15–12); Ross – Walsh Jennings (USA); L 0 – 2 (16–21, 9–21); Artacho – Laird (AUS); W 2 – 0 (21–16, 21–11)	2 Q	Ágatha – Bárbara (BRA); L 0 – 2 (12–21, 16–21)	Did not advance			

=== Indoor ===
==== Women's tournament ====
China women's volleyball team qualified for the Olympics by reaching the top two towards the final match of the 2015 FIVB Volleyball Women's World Cup in Japan.

Summary

Team	Event	Group stage						Quarterfinals	Semifinals	Final / BM	
Team	Event	Opposition Score	Opposition Score	Opposition Score	Opposition Score	Opposition Score	Rank	Opposition Score	Opposition Score	Opposition Score	Rank
China women's	Women's tournament	Netherlands; L 2–3	Italy; W 3–2	Puerto Rico; W 3–0	Serbia; L 0–3	United States; L 3–1	4 Q	Brazil; W 2–3	Netherlands; W 3–1	Serbia; W 3–1	1st place, gold medalist(s)

Team roster

The following is the Chinese roster in the women's volleyball tournament of the 2016 Summer Olympics.

Head coach: Lang Ping

No.	Name	Date of birth	Height	Weight	Spike	Block	2016–17 club
1	Yuan Xinyue	21 December 1996	2.01 m (6 ft 7 in)	78 kg (172 lb)	317 cm (125 in)	311 cm (122 in)	(China) Bayi
2	Zhu Ting	29 November 1994	1.98 m (6 ft 6 in)	78 kg (172 lb)	327 cm (129 in)	300 cm (120 in)	(Turkey) VakıfBank
3	Yang Fangxu	6 October 1994	1.90 m (6 ft 3 in)	71 kg (157 lb)	308 cm (121 in)	300 cm (120 in)	(China) Shandong
6	Gong Xiangyu	21 April 1997	1.86 m (6 ft 1 in)	72 kg (159 lb)	313 cm (123 in)	302 cm (119 in)	(China) Jiangsu
7	Wei Qiuyue	26 September 1988	1.84 m (6 ft 0 in)	65 kg (143 lb)	305 cm (120 in)	300 cm (120 in)	(China) Tianjin
9	Zhang Changning	6 November 1995	1.93 m (6 ft 4 in)	80 kg (180 lb)	315 cm (124 in)	303 cm (119 in)	(China) Jiangsu
10	Liu Xiaotong	16 February 1990	1.88 m (6 ft 2 in)	70 kg (150 lb)	312 cm (123 in)	300 cm (120 in)	(China) Beijing
11	Xu Yunli	2 August 1987	1.96 m (6 ft 5 in)	75 kg (165 lb)	325 cm (128 in)	306 cm (120 in)	(China) Fujian
12	Hui Ruoqi (c)	4 March 1991	1.92 m (6 ft 4 in)	72 kg (159 lb)	315 cm (124 in)	305 cm (120 in)	(China) Jiangsu
15	Lin Li (L)	5 July 1992	1.71 m (5 ft 7 in)	65 kg (143 lb)	294 cm (116 in)	294 cm (116 in)	(China) Fujian
16	Ding Xia	13 January 1990	1.80 m (5 ft 11 in)	61 kg (134 lb)	305 cm (120 in)	300 cm (120 in)	(China) Liaoning
17	Yan Ni	2 March 1987	1.92 m (6 ft 4 in)	74 kg (163 lb)	317 cm (125 in)	306 cm (120 in)	(China) Liaoning

Group play

Pos	Team	Pld	W	L	Pts	SW	SL	SR	SPW	SPL	SPR	Qualification
1	United States	5	5	0	14	15	5	3.000	470	400	1.175	Quarter-finals
2	Netherlands	5	4	1	11	14	7	2.000	455	425	1.071	Quarter-finals
3	Serbia	5	3	2	10	12	6	2.000	410	394	1.041	Quarter-finals
4	China	5	2	3	7	9	9	1.000	398	389	1.023	Quarter-finals
5	Italy	5	1	4	3	4	12	0.333	351	374	0.939	
6	Puerto Rico	5	0	5	0	0	15	0.000	277	379	0.731	

Source: FIVB
Rules for classification: Tiebreakers

6 August 2016; 11:35	China	2–3	Netherlands	Ginásio do Maracanãzinho, Rio de Janeiro; Attendance: 6,410; Referees: Susana Rodríguez (ESP), Paulo Turci (BRA)
6 August 2016; 11:35	(23–25, 25–21, 25–18, 22–25, 13–15); Result Statistics			Ginásio do Maracanãzinho, Rio de Janeiro; Attendance: 6,410; Referees: Susana Rodríguez (ESP), Paulo Turci (BRA)

8 August 2016; 09:30	China	3–0	Italy	Ginásio do Maracanãzinho, Rio de Janeiro; Attendance: 4,804; Referees: Patricia Rolf (USA), Paulo Turci (BRA)
8 August 2016; 09:30	(25–21, 25–21, 25–16); Result Statistics			Ginásio do Maracanãzinho, Rio de Janeiro; Attendance: 4,804; Referees: Patricia Rolf (USA), Paulo Turci (BRA)

10 August 2016; 09:30	China	3–0	Puerto Rico	Ginásio do Maracanãzinho, Rio de Janeiro; Attendance: 4,386; Referees: Heike Kraft (GER), Kang Joo-hee (KOR)
10 August 2016; 09:30	(25–20, 25–17, 25–18); Result Statistics			Ginásio do Maracanãzinho, Rio de Janeiro; Attendance: 4,386; Referees: Heike Kraft (GER), Kang Joo-hee (KOR)

12 August 2016; 09:30	China	0–3	Serbia	Ginásio do Maracanãzinho, Rio de Janeiro; Attendance: 3,509; Referees: Kang Joo-hee (KOR), Susana Rodríguez (ESP)
12 August 2016; 09:30	(19–25, 19–25, 22–25); Result Statistics			Ginásio do Maracanãzinho, Rio de Janeiro; Attendance: 3,509; Referees: Kang Joo-hee (KOR), Susana Rodríguez (ESP)

14 August 2016; 17:05	United States	3–1	China	Ginásio do Maracanãzinho, Rio de Janeiro; Attendance: 6,897; Referees: Heike Kraft (GER), Juraj Mokrý (SVK)
14 August 2016; 17:05	(22–25, 25–17, 25–19, 25–19); Result Statistics			Ginásio do Maracanãzinho, Rio de Janeiro; Attendance: 6,897; Referees: Heike Kraft (GER), Juraj Mokrý (SVK)

Quarterfinal

16 August 2016; 22:15	Brazil	2–3	China	Ginásio do Maracanãzinho, Rio de Janeiro; Attendance: 9,498; Referees: Piotr Dudek (POL), Vladimir Simonović (SRB)
16 August 2016; 22:15	(25–15, 23–25, 22–25, 25–22, 13–15); Result Statistics			Ginásio do Maracanãzinho, Rio de Janeiro; Attendance: 9,498; Referees: Piotr Dudek (POL), Vladimir Simonović (SRB)

Semifinal

18 August 2016; 22:15	China	3–1	Netherlands	Ginásio do Maracanãzinho, Rio de Janeiro; Attendance: 8,411; Referees: Luis Macias (MEX), Fabrizio Pasquali (ITA)
18 August 2016; 22:15	(27–25, 23–25, 29–27, 25–23); Result Statistics			Ginásio do Maracanãzinho, Rio de Janeiro; Attendance: 8,411; Referees: Luis Macias (MEX), Fabrizio Pasquali (ITA)

Gold medal match

20 August 2016; 22:15	China	3–1	Serbia	Ginásio do Maracanãzinho, Rio de Janeiro; Attendance: 8,773; Referees: Susana Rodríguez (ESP), Patricia Rolf (USA)
20 August 2016; 22:15	(19–25, 25–17, 25–22, 25–23); Result Statistics			Ginásio do Maracanãzinho, Rio de Janeiro; Attendance: 8,773; Referees: Susana Rodríguez (ESP), Patricia Rolf (USA)

== Water polo ==
Summary

Key:
- FT – After full time.
- P – Match decided by penalty-shootout.

Team	Event	Group Stage						Quarterfinal	Semifinal	Final / BM	
Team	Event	Opposition Score	Opposition Score	Opposition Score	Opposition Score	Opposition Score	Rank	Opposition Score	Opposition Score	Opposition Score	Rank
China women's	Women's tournament	Hungary; L 11–13	United States; L 4–12	Spain; L 8–12	—N/a		4	Italy; L 7–12	Spain; L 6–11	Brazil; W 10–5	7

=== Women's tournament ===
China women's water polo team qualified for the Olympics by winning the gold medal and securing a lone outright berth at the Asian Championships in Foshan.

Team roster

The following is the Chinese roster in the women's water polo tournament of the 2016 Summer Olympics.

Head coach: (Brazil) Ricardo Azevedo

№	Name	Pos.	Height	Weight	Date of birth	2016 club
1	Yang Jun	GK	1.80 m (5 ft 11 in)	69 kg (152 lb)	28 April 1988	(China) Tianjin
2	Ma Huanhuan	D	1.78 m (5 ft 10 in)	66 kg (146 lb)	13 January 1990	(China) Guangxi
3	Mei Xiaohan	CB	1.80 m (5 ft 11 in)	100 kg (220 lb)	11 November 1996	(China) Tianjin
4	Xiong Dunhan	CF	1.81 m (5 ft 11 in)	83 kg (183 lb)	11 November 1998	(China) Hunan
5	Niu Guannan	D	1.77 m (5 ft 10 in)	68 kg (150 lb)	10 May 1992	(China) Guangxi
6	Sun Yating	CF	1.78 m (5 ft 10 in)	76 kg (168 lb)	24 February 1988	(China) Tianjin
7	Song Donglun	D	1.78 m (5 ft 10 in)	83 kg (183 lb)	28 April 1991	(China) Tianjin
8	Zhang Cong	D	1.76 m (5 ft 9 in)	62 kg (137 lb)	3 May 1990	(China) Tianjin
9	Zhao Zihan	D	1.72 m (5 ft 8 in)	62 kg (137 lb)	4 September 1993	(China) Shanghai
10	Zhang Weiwei	D	1.82 m (6 ft 0 in)	66 kg (146 lb)	7 October 1990	(China) Sichuan
11	Wang Xinyan	CB	1.81 m (5 ft 11 in)	73 kg (161 lb)	26 April 1991	(China) Shanghai
12	Zhang Jing	D	1.66 m (5 ft 5 in)	62 kg (137 lb)	16 June 1996	(China) Fujian
13	Peng Lin	GK	1.85 m (6 ft 1 in)	73 kg (161 lb)	4 April 1995	(China) Hunan

Group play

Pos	Team	Pld	W	D	L	GF	GA	GD	Pts	Qualification
1	United States	3	3	0	0	34	14	+20	6	Quarter-finals
2	Spain	3	2	0	1	27	29	−2	4	Quarter-finals
3	Hungary	3	1	0	2	29	33	−4	2	Quarter-finals
4	China	3	0	0	3	23	37	−14	0	Quarter-finals

Source: Rio2016
Rules for classification: 1) Points; 2) Head-to-head points; 3) Head-to-head goal difference; 4) Head-to-head goals scored; 5) Goal difference.

9 August 2016; 09:00	Report	China	11–13	Hungary	Maria Lenk Aquatic Center, Rio de Janeiro; Referees: Nenad Peris (CRO), Georgios Stavridis (GRE)
9 August 2016; 09:00	Report	Score by quarters: 2–2, 4–4, 3–6, 2–1			Maria Lenk Aquatic Center, Rio de Janeiro; Referees: Nenad Peris (CRO), Georgios Stavridis (GRE)
9 August 2016; 09:00	Report	Ma Huanhuan, Niu Guannan 3	Goals	Czigány 4	Maria Lenk Aquatic Center, Rio de Janeiro; Referees: Nenad Peris (CRO), Georgios Stavridis (GRE)

11 August 2016; 11:40	Report	China	4–12	United States	Maria Lenk Aquatic Center, Rio de Janeiro; Referees: Radosław Koryzna (POL), Filippo Gomez (ITA)
11 August 2016; 11:40	Report	Score by quarters: 1–4, 0–3, 2–3, 1–2			Maria Lenk Aquatic Center, Rio de Janeiro; Referees: Radosław Koryzna (POL), Filippo Gomez (ITA)
11 August 2016; 11:40	Report	four players 1	Goals	Musselman, Steffens 4	Maria Lenk Aquatic Center, Rio de Janeiro; Referees: Radosław Koryzna (POL), Filippo Gomez (ITA)

13 August 2016; 09:00	Report	China	8–12	Spain	Maria Lenk Aquatic Center, Rio de Janeiro; Referees: Boris Margeta (SLO), German Moller (ARG)
13 August 2016; 09:00	Report	Score by quarters: 2–3, 4–4, 1–2, 1–3			Maria Lenk Aquatic Center, Rio de Janeiro; Referees: Boris Margeta (SLO), German Moller (ARG)
13 August 2016; 09:00	Report	Zhang Cong 3	Goals	López 4	Maria Lenk Aquatic Center, Rio de Janeiro; Referees: Boris Margeta (SLO), German Moller (ARG)

Quarterfinal

15 August 2016; 19:40	Report	Italy	12–7	China	Olympic Aquatics Stadium, Rio de Janeiro; Referees: Georgios Stavridis (GRE), Adrian Alexandrescu (ROU)
15 August 2016; 19:40	Report	Score by quarters: 1–1, 3–1, 4–2, 4–3			Olympic Aquatics Stadium, Rio de Janeiro; Referees: Georgios Stavridis (GRE), Adrian Alexandrescu (ROU)
15 August 2016; 19:40	Report	Bianconi 3	Goals	Zhang Cong 3	Olympic Aquatics Stadium, Rio de Janeiro; Referees: Georgios Stavridis (GRE), Adrian Alexandrescu (ROU)

Classification semifinal (5–8)

17 August 2016; 15:10	Report	Spain	11–6	China	Olympic Aquatics Stadium, Rio de Janeiro; Referees: Radosław Koryzna (POL), Fabio Toffoli (ITA)
17 August 2016; 15:10	Report	Score by quarters: 2–2, 2–0, 4–2, 3–2			Olympic Aquatics Stadium, Rio de Janeiro; Referees: Radosław Koryzna (POL), Fabio Toffoli (ITA)
17 August 2016; 15:10	Report	five players 2	Goals	Ma Huanhuan 2	Olympic Aquatics Stadium, Rio de Janeiro; Referees: Radosław Koryzna (POL), Fabio Toffoli (ITA)

Seventh place match

19 August 2016; 10:00	Report	Brazil	5–10	China	Olympic Aquatics Stadium, Rio de Janeiro; Referees: Daniel Flahive (AUS), Nenad Peris (CRO)
19 August 2016; 10:00	Report	Score by quarters: 2–2, 0–2, 0–2, 3–4			Olympic Aquatics Stadium, Rio de Janeiro; Referees: Daniel Flahive (AUS), Nenad Peris (CRO)
19 August 2016; 10:00	Report	Chiappini 3	Goals	three players 2	Olympic Aquatics Stadium, Rio de Janeiro; Referees: Daniel Flahive (AUS), Nenad Peris (CRO)

== Weightlifting ==
Chinese weightlifters have qualified a maximum of six men's and four women's quota places for the Rio Olympics based on their combined team standing by points at the 2014 and 2015 IWF World Championships. The team must allocate these places to individual athletes by June 20, 2016.

The full weightlifting squad was named at the internal selection trials in Beijing on July 6 and 7, 2016, including former Olympic champions like Long Qingquan (men's 56 kg) and Lü Xiaojun (men's 77 kg).

Men

Athlete	Event	Snatch		Clean & Jerk		Total	Rank
Athlete	Event	Result	Rank	Result	Rank	Total	Rank
Long Qingquan	−56 kg	137	1	170 OR	1	307 WR	1st place, gold medalist(s)
Chen Lijun	−62 kg	~~143~~	DNF	—	—	—	DNF
Shi Zhiyong	−69 kg	162	2	190	1	352	1st place, gold medalist(s)
Lü Xiaojun	−77 kg	177 WR	1	202	2	379	2nd place, silver medalist(s)
Tian Tao	−85 kg	178	2	217 OR	=1	395	2nd place, silver medalist(s)
Yang Zhe	−105 kg	190	=4	225	3	415	4

Women

Athlete	Event	Snatch		Clean & Jerk		Total	Rank
Athlete	Event	Result	Rank	Result	Rank	Total	Rank
Li Yajun	−53 kg	101 OR	1	~~126~~	DNF	101	DNF
Deng Wei	−63 kg	115	1	147 OR	1	262 WR	1st place, gold medalist(s)
Xiang Yanmei	−69 kg	116	1	145	1	261	1st place, gold medalist(s)
Meng Suping	+75 kg	130	2	177	1	307	1st place, gold medalist(s)

== Wrestling ==
China has qualified a total of thirteen wrestlers for each the following weight classes into the Olympic tournament. Four of them finished among the top six to book Olympic spots in all women's freestyle events (except 58 & 63 kg) at the 2015 World Championships, while five additional berths were awarded to Chinese wrestlers, who progressed to the top two finals at the 2016 Asian Qualification Tournament.

Four further wrestlers had claimed the remaining Olympic slots to round out the Chinese roster in separate Olympic Qualification Tournaments; three of them at the initial meet in Ulaanbaatar and one more in men's freestyle 86 kg at the final meet in Istanbul.

Key:
- VT – Victory by Fall.
- PP – Decision by Points – the loser with technical points.
- PO – Decision by Points – the loser without technical points.
- ST – Technical superiority – the loser without technical points and a margin of victory of at least 8 (Greco-Roman) or 10 (freestyle) points.
- SP – Technical superiority – the loser with technical points and a margin of victory of at least 8 (Greco-Roman) or 10 (freestyle) points.

Men's freestyle

Athlete	Event	Qualification	Round of 16	Quarterfinal	Semifinal	Repechage 1	Repechage 2	Final / BM	
Athlete	Event	Opposition Result	Opposition Result	Opposition Result	Opposition Result	Opposition Result	Opposition Result	Opposition Result	Rank
Yeerlanbieke Katai	−65 kg	Prizreni (AUS); W 3–1 ^{PP}	Ganzorig (MGL); L 0–3 ^{PO}	Did not advance					12
Bi Shengfeng	−86 kg	Bye	Sharifov (AZE); L 0–4 ^{ST}	Did not advance					19
Deng Zhiwei	−125 kg	Bye	Berianidze (ARM); L 1–3 ^{PP}	Did not advance					13

Men's Greco-Roman

Athlete	Event	Qualification	Round of 16	Quarterfinal	Semifinal	Repechage 1	Repechage 2	Final / BM	
Athlete	Event	Opposition Result	Opposition Result	Opposition Result	Opposition Result	Opposition Result	Opposition Result	Opposition Result	Rank
Wang Lumin	−59 kg	Bye	Montaño (ECU); W 4–0 ^{ST}	Borrero (CUB); L 0–4 ^{ST}	Did not advance	Bye	Eraliev (KGZ); L 1–3 ^{PP}	Did not advance	8
Yang Bin	−75 kg	Bye	Ayet Ikram (MAR); W 3–0 ^{PO}	Vlasov (RUS); L 0–4 ^{ST}	Did not advance	Bye	Kim H-w (KOR); L 1–3 ^{PP}	Did not advance	9
Peng Fei	−85 kg	Bye	Hamzatau (BLR); L 0–3 ^{PO}	Did not advance					17
Xiao Di	−98 kg	Bye	Lugo (CUB); L 0–3 ^{PO}	Did not advance		Bye	Rezaei (IRI); L 0–3 ^{PO}	Did not advance	19
Meng Qiang	−130 kg	Bye	Babajanzadeh (IRI); L 1–3 ^{PP}	Did not advance					13

Women's freestyle

Athlete	Event	Qualification	Round of 16	Quarterfinal	Semifinal	Repechage 1	Repechage 2	Final / BM	
Athlete	Event	Opposition Result	Opposition Result	Opposition Result	Opposition Result	Opposition Result	Opposition Result	Opposition Result	Rank
Sun Yanan	−48 kg	Bye	Mian (CAN); W 4–1 ^{SP}	Phogat (IND); W 5–0 ^{VB}	Tosaka (JPN); L 1–3 ^{PP}	Bye		Eshimova (KAZ); W 4–0 ^{ST}	3rd place, bronze medalist(s)
Zhong Xuechun	−53 kg	Hemmer (GER); W 3–1 ^{PP}	Maroulis (USA); L 0–4 ^{ST}	Did not advance		Khalvadzhy (UKR); W 4–1 ^{SP}	Jong M-s (PRK); W 3–1 ^{PP}	Mattsson (SWE); L 0–3 ^{PO}	5
Xu Rui	−63 kg	Bye	Tkach (UKR); W 3–1 ^{PP}	Trazhukova (RUS); L 1–3 ^{PP}	Did not advance				11
Zhou Feng	−69 kg	Bye	Focken (GER); L 1–3 ^{PP}	Did not advance					12
Zhang Fengliu	−75 kg	Bye	Mäe (EST); W 3–1 ^{PP}	Wiebe (CAN); L 1–3 ^{PP}	Did not advance	Bye	Selmaier (GER); W 4–0 ^{ST}	Marzaliuk (BLR); W 3–1 ^{PP}	3rd place, bronze medalist(s)

== See also ==
- China at the 2016 Summer Paralympics
