= Taekwondo at the 2016 Summer Olympics – Men's 58 kg =

Taekwondo competition

Men's 58kg at the Games of the XXXI Olympiad
- Venue: Carioca Arena 3
- Date: 17 August 2016
- Competitors: 16 from 16 nations

Medalists
1st place, gold medalist(s)		Zhao Shuai	China
2nd place, silver medalist(s)		Tawin Hanprab	Thailand
3rd place, bronze medalist(s)		Luisito Pié	Dominican Republic
3rd place, bronze medalist(s)		Kim Tae-hun	South Korea

The men's 58 kg competition at the 2016 Summer Olympics was held on 17 August, at the Carioca Arena 3.

== Competition format ==
The main bracket consisted of a single elimination tournament, culminating in the gold medal match. The top eight athletes in each event were seeded so as not to face each other in the preliminary round. The remainder of the qualified athletes were drawn randomly on 15 August 2016. Two bronze medals were awarded at the Taekwondo competitions. A repechage was used to determine the bronze medal winners. Every competitor who lost to one of the two finalists competed in the repechage, another single-elimination competition. Each semifinal loser faced the last remaining repechage competitor from the opposite half of the bracket in a bronze medal match.

== Schedule ==
All times are in local time (UTC-3).

Date	Time	Round
Wednesday, 17 August 2016	9:15; 15:15; 17:15; 20:15; 21:15; 22:15	Preliminary round Quarterfinals; Semifinals; Repechage; Bronze medal matches Final

== Seeds ==
Every practitioner was seeded at the event. Practitioners representing the hosting nation were seeded as no. 4 regardless of their current world ranking.

1. Farzan Ashourzadeh (IRI)
2. Kim Tae-hun (KOR)
3. Rui Bragança (POR)
4. Venilton Teixeira (BRA)
5. Carlos Navarro (MEX)
6. Levent Tuncat (GER)
7. Si Mohamed Ketbi (BEL)
8. Zhao Shuai (CHN)
9. Jesús Tortosa (ESP)
10. Safwan Khalil (AUS)
11. Luisito Pie (DOM)
12. Yousef Shriha (LBA)
13. Ron Atias (ISR)
14. Óscar Muñoz (COL)
15. Tawin Hanprab (THA)
16. Omar Hajjami (MAR)

== Results ==
=== Main bracket ===
Legend

- DSQ – Disqualified
- PTG – Won by points gap
- SUD – Won by sudden death (golden point)

Preliminary round
13	Ron Atias (ISR)	2
4	Venilton Teixeira (BRA)	16 (PTG)
5	Carlos Navarro (MEX)	23 (PTG)
12	Yousef Shriha (LBA)	9
9	Jesús Tortosa (ESP)	3
8	Zhao Shuai (CHN)	7
1	Farzan Ashourzadeh (IRI)	3
16	Omar Hajjami (MAR)	4
15	Tawin Hanprab (THA)	12
2	Kim Tae-hun (KOR)	10
7	Si Mohamed Ketbi (BEL)	1
10	Safwan Khalil (AUS)	8
11	Luisito Pié (DOM)
6	Levent Tuncat (GER)	DSQ
3	Rui Bragança (POR)	14 (PTG)
14	Óscar Muñoz (COL)	3

Quarterfinals
4	Venilton Teixeira (BRA)	5
5	Carlos Navarro (MEX)	8
8	Zhao Shuai (CHN)	8
16	Omar Hajjami (MAR)	1
15	Tawin Hanprab (THA)	11
10	Safwan Khalil (AUS)	9
11	Luisito Pié (DOM)	4
3	Rui Bragança (POR)	1

Semifinals
5	Carlos Navarro (MEX)	4
8	Zhao Shuai (CHN)	9
15	Tawin Hanprab (THA)	11
11	Luisito Pié (DOM)	7

Gold medal match
8	Zhao Shuai (CHN)	6
15	Tawin Hanprab (THA)	4

=== Repechage ===
Repechage
Omar Hajjami (MAR)	1
Jesús Tortosa (ESP)	4
Kim Tae-hun (KOR)	4
Safwan Khalil (AUS)	1

Bronze medal matches
Luisito Pié (DOM)	6 (SUD)
Jesús Tortosa (ESP)	5
Kim Tae-hun (KOR)	7
Carlos Navarro (MEX)	5
