= Ketbi =

Ketbi and Al Ketbi are Arab surnames:

- Fatima bint Mubarak Al Ketbi, one of the wives of the UAE's founder
- Si Mohamed Ketbi (born 1997), Belgian taekwondo athlete
