= Taekwondo at the 2015 European Games – Men's 58 kg =

Taekwondo competition

Men's 58 kg at the 2015 European Games
- Venue: Crystal Hall complex
- Date: 16 June
- Competitors: 16 from 16 nations

Medalists
gold medal	Rui Bragança	Portugal
silver medal	Jesús Tortosa	Spain
bronze medal	Si Mohamed Ketbi	Belgium
bronze medal	Levent Tuncat	Germany

Men's 58 kg competition at the Taekwondo at the 2015 European Games in Baku, Azerbaijan, took place on 16 June at the Crystal Hall complex.

== Schedule ==
All times are Azerbaijan Summer Time (UTC+5).

Date	Time	Event
Tuesday, 16 June 2015	11:00	1/8 finals
Tuesday, 16 June 2015	13:00	Quarterfinals
Tuesday, 16 June 2015	13:00	Semifinals
Tuesday, 16 June 2015	15:00	Repechage
Tuesday, 16 June 2015	19:00	Finals

== Results ==
1/8 finals
Levent Tuncat (GER)	7
Meisam Rafiei (ISL)	3
Arman Irgaliev (RUS)	11
Georgios Simitsis (GRE)	2
Jesús Tortosa (ESP)	12
Illia Kokshyntsau (BLR)	0
Gili Haimovitz (ISR)	4
Mahammad Mammadov (AZE)	7
Rui Bragança (POR)	12
Görkem Sezer (TUR)	0
Miloš Gladović (SRB)	8
Stepan Dimitrov (MDA)	7
Dylan Chellamootoo (FRA)	4
Max Cater (GBR)	7
Eryk Rodzik (POL)	6
Si Mohamed Ketbi (BEL)	18

Quarterfinals
Levent Tuncat (GER)	5
Arman Irgaliev (RUS)	2
Jesús Tortosa (ESP)	8
Mahammad Mammadov (AZE)	3
Rui Bragança (POR)	13
Miloš Gladović (SRB)	7
Max Cater (GBR)	3
Si Mohamed Ketbi (BEL)	13

Semifinals
Levent Tuncat (GER)	5
Jesús Tortosa (ESP)	17
Rui Bragança (POR)	11
Si Mohamed Ketbi (BEL)	4

Final
Jesús Tortosa (ESP)	5
Rui Bragança (POR)	6

=== Repechage ===
Repechage round 1
Illia Kokshyntsau (BLR)	3
Mahammad Mammadov (AZE)	15
Görkem Sezer (TUR)	8
Miloš Gladović (SRB)	9

Bronze medal match
Mahammad Mammadov (AZE)	4
Si Mohamed Ketbi (BEL)	5
Miloš Gladović (SRB)	1
Levent Tuncat (GER)	6
