= Ruslan Poiseev =

Russian taekwondo practitioner (born 1987)

Ruslan Poiseev (born February 4, 1987) is a Russian Taekwondo athlete who won a bronze medal at the 2015 World Taekwondo Championships. He won 8-6 in 1/4-Final against Lucas Guzmán but was defeated 12-11 by Farzan Ashourzadeh in the next round.
