= Farzan Ashourzadeh =

Iranian taekwondo practitioner

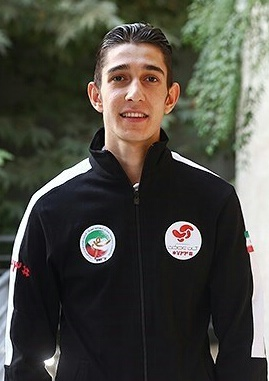

Personal information
- Nationality: Iranian
- Born: 25 November 1996 (age 29) Abbasabad, Mazandaran, Iran
- Height: 1.85 m (6 ft 1 in)
- Weight: 58 kg (128 lb)

Sport
- Sport: Taekwondo
Medal record
Event	1st	2nd	3rd
World Championships	1	–	–
Asian Games	1	–	1
Asian Championships	1	1	–
World Cup	–	–	1
World Grand Prix	3	3	2
World Championships
Gold medal – first place	2015 Chelyabinsk	58 kg
Asian Games
Gold medal – first place	2014 Incheon	58 kg
Bronze medal – third place	2018 Jakarta	58 kg
Asian Championships
Gold medal – first place	2014 Tashkent	58 kg
Silver medal – second place	2018 Ho Chi Minh City	58 kg

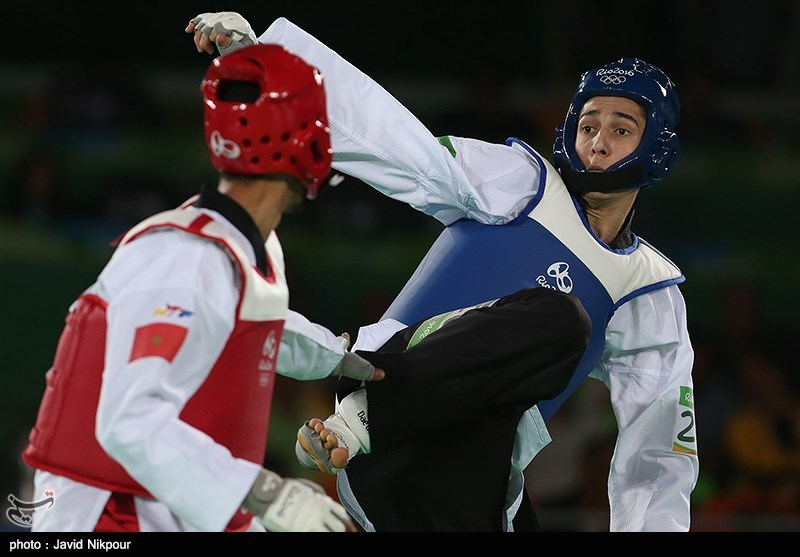
Farzan at the 2016 Summer Olympics

Farzan Ashourzadeh Fallah (Persian: فرزان عاشورزاده فلاح, born November 25, 1996, in Tonekabon, Mazandaran, Iran) is an Iranian taekwondo practitioner. He won the gold medal in the flyweight division (-58 kg) at the 2014 Asian Games in Incheon, South Korea. In 2016 he participated at the 2016 Summer Olympics but surprisingly lost in the 1/08-Finale against Omar Hajjami.

== Personal life ==
On 10 January 2026, Ashourzadeh publicly supported the 2025–2026 Iranian protests by appealing to the international community to oppose the Islamic Republic government's internet cuts, stating: "History has shown that whenever the internet is shut down, severe violence, widespread repression, and deadly crimes against civilians follow." On 17 January, Ashourzadeh, in response to the high death toll from the protests, shared a poem from Fereydoon Moshiri which says: "In the wake of all the blood that dripped on this soil; may this life be our shame, may this bread be our shame, we sat and watched."
