= Yousef Shriha =

Libyan taekwondo athlete (born 1991)

Personal information
- Nationality: Libyan
- Born: 18 November 1991 (age 34)

Sport
- Sport: Taekwondo
Medal record
Representing Libya
African Championships
Bronze medal – third place	2014 Tunis	58 kg
Gold medal – first place	2016 Port Said	58 kg
Bronze medal – third place	2018 Agadir	58 kg

Yousef Saleh Shriha (born 18 November 1991) is a Libyan taekwondo athlete.

He represented his country at the 2016 Summer Olympics in Rio de Janeiro in the men's 58 kg category, where he was defeated by Carlos Navarro in the first round.
