= Si Mohamed Ketbi =

Belgian taekwondo practitioner

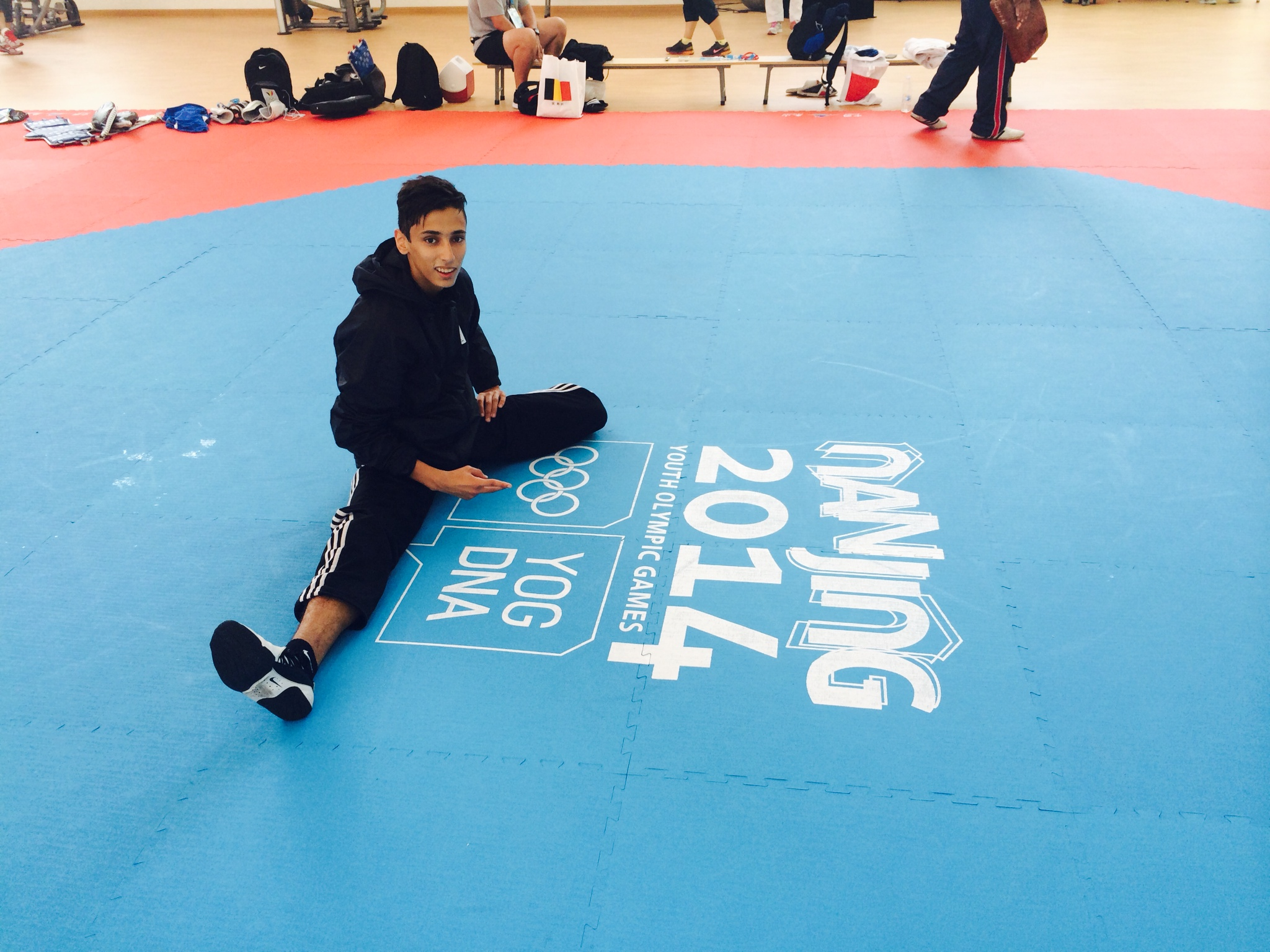
- Ketbi at the 2014 Youth Olympic Games in Nanjing

Personal information
- Nationality: Belgian
- Born: 27 December 1997 (age 28)
- Height: 180 cm (5 ft 11 in)
- Weight: 68 kg (150 lb)

Sport
- Sport: Taekwondo
- Club: Fung Sing Taekwondo
- Coached by: Léonardo Gambluch
Medal record
Men's taekwondo
Representing Belgium
World Championships
Silver medal – second place	2015 Chelyabinsk	58 kg
European Games
Bronze medal – third place	2015 Baku	58 kg
Youth Olympic Games
Bronze medal – third place	2014 Nanjing	55 kg
European Under 21 Championships
Bronze medal – third place	2014 Innsbruck	58 kg
Gold medal – first place	2015 Bukarest	63 kg
European Junior Championships
Bronze medal – third place	2013 Porto	55 kg

Si Mohamed Ketbi (born 27 December 1997) is a Belgian taekwondo athlete.

He represented his country at the 2016 Summer Olympics in Rio de Janeiro, in the men's 58 kg.

In 2017, he competed in the men's featherweight event at the 2017 World Taekwondo Championships held in Muju, South Korea.
