= Zhao Shuai =

Chinese Taekwondo practitioner

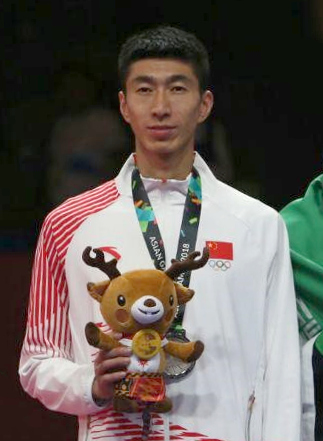
- Zhao at the 2018 Asian Games

Personal information
- Born: 15 August 1995 (age 30) Changzhou, China
- Height: 188 cm (6 ft 2 in)
- Spouse: Zheng Shuyin

Sport
- Sport: Taekwondo
- Coached by: Guan Jianmin
Medal record
Men's taekwondo
Representing China
Olympic Games
Gold medal – first place	2016 Rio de Janeiro	58 kg
Bronze medal – third place	2020 Tokyo	68 kg
World Championships
Gold medal – first place	2017 Muju	63 kg
Gold medal – first place	2019 Manchester	63 kg
Bronze medal – third place	2015 Chelyabinsk	58 kg
Grand Slam
Gold medal – first place	2018 Wuxi	68 kg
Silver medal – second place	2017 Wuxi	68 kg
Grand Prix
Silver medal – second place	2014 Manchester	58 kg
Bronze medal – third place	2015 Samsun	58 kg
Bronze medal – third place	2019 Rome	68 kg
Gold medal – first place	2019 Sofia	68 kg
Asian Games
Silver medal – second place	2018 Jakarta	63 kg
Asian Championships
Bronze medal – third place	2016 Manila	63 kg
World Junior Championships
Bronze medal – third place	2012 Sharm El-Sheikh	59 kg
- Updated on 16 December 2018

Zhao Shuai (Chinese: 赵帅; born 15 August 1995) is a Chinese taekwondo practitioner. He won gold medals at the 2016 Olympics and 2017 World Championships, placing third earlier in 2015. He served as the flag bearer for China at the opening ceremony of the 2018 Asian Games, where he later won a silver medal.

Zhao took up taekwondo in 2006. He has a degree in physical education from the Southwest University.

In 2019, he won the gold medal in the men's bantamweight event at the 2019 World Taekwondo Championships in Manchester, United Kingdom.

== Personal life ==
Zhao was born on 15 August 1995 in Changzhou in the province of Jiangsu.

His spouse was also an Olympic champion in Rio 2016, Zheng Shuyin.

== Career ==
In December 2010, Zhao Shuai won the men's 54 kg championship at the National Taekwondo Championships.

In May 2011, in the men's 54 kg competition of the World Taekwondo Championships, Zhao Shuai defeated Yanmat and Al Marzouch and advanced to the third round; but then lost to Thailand's Keha in the third round. Flower, missed the quarterfinals In October, Zhao Shuai lost to Song Weijie 3:8 in the men's 58 kg Taekwondo final of the Seventh National Urban Games and won the silver medal. In November, in the men's 54 kg final of the National Taekwondo Championship, Zhao Shuai defeated Guizhou team's Chen Tianyang 12:4 and won the championship.

In September 2013, in the men's 58 kg Taekwondo final of the 12th National Games, Zhao Shuai defeated Fujian player Xu Yongzeng 3:2 to win the championship, achieving a breakthrough for the Jiangsu Taekwondo men's team with zero gold medals in the National Games. In October, in the men's 54–58 kg competition of the Sixth East Asian Games, Zhao Shuai eliminated Huang Changqi and advanced to the final. In the final, he defeated South Korea's Kwon Hyuk-kyung 5:3 and won the gold medal.

In the fourth round of the taekwondo competition at the Incheon Asian Games in 2014, Zhao Shuai lost to the Iranian champion of this level by one point in the last 5 seconds, and finally finished fifth in the men's taekwondo 58 kg event. In November, in the men's 63 kg final of the National Taekwondo Championship, Zhao Shuai defeated Beijing player Hu Pengxiang 13:1 and won the championship. In May, at the World Taekwondo Championships, Zhao Shuai started from the men's 58 kg Group B, stopped in the Group B finals, and finally finished third.

In August 2016, in the 58 kg of the Taekwondo men's 58 kg match in the Rio de Janeiro Olympic Games, Zhao Shuai defeated Kabrier, Hargie, Navaro Waldiz, to break into the final; the final defeated Thai player Han 6: 4 Plabu, won the gold medal. This is the first gold of Chinese Taekwondo in the Rio Olympics, and the first gold medal in the history of Chinese men's Taekwondo Olympics.

In June 2017, in the men's 63 kg final of the World Taekwondo Championships, Zhao Shuai defeated Iran's Joseni 11:5 and won the championship. This was his first world championship and also the first world championship for Chinese men's taekwondo. gold medal.

On September 5, in the men's 68 kg Taekwondo final of the 13th National Games, Zhao Shuai defeated Zhao Panfeng 8:5 and won the championship.

On August 22, 2018, in the taekwondo men's 63 kg and under category at the Jakarta Asian Games, Zhao Shuai defeated Mehtasoyev, Mo Nut, and He Jiaxin to reach the final; he lost to Iran's Hussein at 11:17 in the final. Because, won the runner-up.

In March 2019, in the men's under-68 kg final of the U.S. Taekwondo Open, Zhao Shuai defeated British player McNish 19:17 and won the championship. In May, in the men's 63 kg final of the World Taekwondo Championships, Zhao Shuai defeated Iranian player Ahmadi 27:7 to defend his title. On December 18, at the World Taekwondo Grand Slam Championship Series held in Wuxi, Zhao Shuai won the runner-up in the men's under-68 kg category, and at the same time qualified for the 2020 Tokyo Olympics by ranking first in the Grand Slam points of this level.

On July 25, 2021, in the men's 68 kg taekwondo competition at the Tokyo Olympics, Zhao Shuai first defeated Sediqi 22:20, and then eliminated Bernardo Piet 13:8 in the quarter-finals. He lost to Hinton 25:33 in the final and missed the final; but then defeated Li Daxun 17:15 in the third place battle and won the bronze medal. On September 24, in the men's taekwondo-68 kg final of the 14th Games of the People's Republic of China, Zhao Shuai defeated Chen Bolin 20:8 and won his third National Games championship.

== Personal life ==
Zhao Shuai and Chinese taekwondo athlete Zheng Shuyin are boyfriend and girlfriend. They met on the Chinese national taekwondo team.

On November 22, 2021, Zhao Shuai successfully proposed to his teammate Zheng Shuyin. The two people who have been in love for ten years will get married.

On June 17, 2023, Zhao Shuai officially announced on Weibo that he and Zheng Shuyin were getting married.

On August 6, 2023, Chinese Taekwondo’s Zhao Shuai and Zheng Shuyin held their wedding.

== social activity ==
On October 22, 2023, the 2023 Suzhou Taihu Marathon started with the gun fired on the 22nd, with Zhao Shuai and Zheng Shuyin leading the race.

Olympic Games
Preceded by Lei Sheng	Flagbearer for China (with Zhu Ting); Tokyo 2020	Succeeded by Feng Yu & Ma Long
