= Tawin Hanprab =

Thai taekwondo practitioner

Tawin Hanprab ChBh
Personal information
- Native name: เทวินทร์ หาญปราบ
- Nickname: Tem
- National team: Thailand
- Born: Tawin Hanprab; 1 August 1998 (age 28) Pathum Thani Province
- Height: 181 cm (5 ft 11 in)
- Weight: 58 kg (128 lb)
Medal record
Representing Thailand
Men's taekwondo
Olympic Games
Silver medal – second place	2016 Rio de Janeiro	58 kg
Grand Prix
Bronze medal – third place	2017 London	58 kg
Asian Championships
Bronze medal – third place	2018 Ho Chi Minh City	58 kg
Universiade
Bronze medal – third place	2017 Taipei	58 kg
Southeast Asian Games
Gold medal – first place	2017 Kuala Lumpur	58 kg
Bronze medal – third place	2021 Hanoi	63 kg
Asian Junior Championships
Bronze medal – third place	2015 Taipei	51 kg

Tawin "Tem" Hanprab (Thai: เทวินทร์ หาญปราบ; RTGS: Thewin Hanprap; born 1 August 1998 in Nong Suea District, Pathum Thani Province) is a Thai taekwondo practitioner. He won the silver medal at the 2016 Summer Olympics Men's 58 kg.
