= Levent Tuncat =

German taekwondo practitioner

Personal information
- Nationality: Germany
- Born: 29 July 1988 (age 37) Duisburg, North Rhine- Westphalia, West Germany
- Height: 1.73 m (5 ft 8 in)
- Weight: 58 kg (128 lb)

Sport
- Sport: Taekwondo
- Event: −58 kg
- Club: TKD Center Laar
- Coached by: Cevdet Mutlu
Medal record
Men's taekwondo
Representing Germany
European Championships
Gold medal – first place	2005 Riga	−54 kg
Gold medal – first place	2006 Bonn	−58 kg
Gold medal – first place	2008 Rome	−58 kg
Silver medal – second place	2014 Baku	−58 kg
European Games
Bronze medal – third place	2015 Baku	−58 kg

Levent Tuncat (born 29 July 1988 in Duisburg, North Rhine-Westphalia) is a German taekwondo practitioner of Turkish descent. He won three gold medals for the 54 and 58 kg classes at the European Taekwondo Championships (2005 in Riga, Latvia, 2006 in Bonn, Germany, and 2008 in Rome, Italy).

Tuncat qualified for the men's 58 kg class at the 2008 Summer Olympics in Beijing, after placing second from the World Qualification Tournament in Manchester, England. He lost in the preliminary round of sixteen match to Afghanistan's Rohullah Nikpai, with a sudden death score of 3–4.
