= Omar Hajjami =

Moroccan taekwondo practitioner

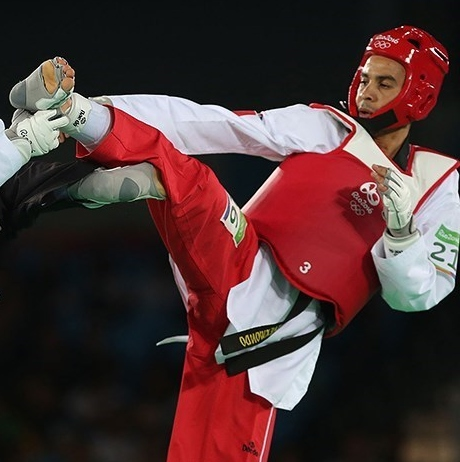
- Hajjami at the 2016 Olympics

Personal information
- Nationality: Moroccan
- Born: 31 July 1990 (age 35)
- Height: 175 cm (5 ft 9 in)

Sport
- Sport: Taekwondo
- Club: Club Imaili

Omar Hajjami (Arabic: عمر حجامي; born 31 July 1990) is a Moroccan taekwondo practitioner. He competed in the 58 kg division at the 2016 Summer Olympics, but was eliminated in the second bout.
