= List of taekwondo practitioners at the 2016 Summer Olympics =

This is a list of the taekwondo practitioners who will be participating for their country at the 2016 Summer Olympics in Rio de Janeiro, Brazil from August 5–21, 2016. 128 competitors are set to participate at the Games across eight events.

== Male taekwondo practitioners ==
NOC	Name	Age	Hometown	Event	Olympic Ranking
Australia	Safwan Khalil	May 15, 1986 (aged 30)	(Australia) (New South Wales) Sydney	Men's 58 kg	14
Australia	Hayder Shkara	May 21, 1990 (aged 26)	(Australia)	Men's 80 kg	20
Azerbaijan	Milad Beigi	March 1, 1991 (aged 25)	(Iran) Isfahan	Men's 80 kg	15
Azerbaijan	Radik Isayev	September 26, 1989 (aged 26)	(Azerbaijan)	Men's +80 kg	4
Belarus	Arman-Marshall Silla	July 13, 1994 (aged 22)	(Belarus)	Men's +80 kg	13
Belgium	Si Mohamed Ketbi	December 27, 1997 (aged 18)	(Belgium)	Men's 58 kg	8
Belgium	Jaouad Achab	August 20, 1992 (aged 23)	(Belgium)	Men's 68 kg	1
Brazil	Venilton Teixeira	September 6, 1995 (aged 20)	(Brazil)	Men's 58 kg	26
Brazil	Maicon Siqueira	January 9, 1993 (aged 23)	(Brazil)	Men's +80 kg	51
Central African Republic	David Boui	June 28, 1988 (aged 28)	(Central African Republic) Bangui	Men's 68 kg	115
Chile	Ignacio Morales	August 12, 1995 (aged 20)	(Chile)	Men's 68 kg	61
China	Zhao Shuai	August 15, 1995 (aged 20)	(China)	Men's 58 kg	11
China	Qiao Sen	May 14, 1990 (aged 26)	(China)	Men's +80 kg	27
Chinese Taipei	Liu Wei-ting		(Chinese Taipei)	Men's 80 kg	11
Colombia	Óscar Muñoz	May 3, 1993 (aged 23)	(Colombia)	Men's 58 kg	56
Croatia	Filip Grgić	October 25, 1989 (aged 26)	(Croatia) Zagreb	Men's 68 kg	43
Cuba	Rafael Castillo		(Cuba)	Men's +80 kg	11
Dominican Republic	Luisito Pie	March 4, 1994 (aged 22)	(Dominican Republic)	Men's 58 kg	20
Dominican Republic	Moisés Hernández	March 22, 1993 (aged 23)	(Dominican Republic)	Men's 80 kg	19
Egypt	Ghofran Zaki	September 30, 1993 (aged 22)	(Egypt)	Men's 68 kg	16
France	M'bar N'diaye	June 15, 1983 (aged 33)	(France)	Men's +80 kg	5
Gabon	Anthony Obame	September 10, 1988 (aged 27)	(Gabon) Libreville	Men's +80 kg	8
Germany	Levent Tuncat	July 29, 1988 (aged 28)	(Germany) Duisburg	Men's 58 kg	6
Germany	Tahir Güleç	February 25, 1993 (aged 23)	(Germany)	Men's 80 kg	9
Great Britain	Lutalo Muhammad	June 3, 1991 (aged 25)	(United Kingdom) Manchester	Men's 80 kg	5
Great Britain	Mahama Cho	August 16, 1989 (aged 26)	(United Kingdom) London	Men's +80 kg	12
Honduras	Miguel Ferrera	May 25, 1981 (aged 35)	(Honduras)	Men's 80 kg	50
Iran	Farzan Ashourzadeh	November 25, 1996 (aged 19)	(Iran) Tonekabon	Men's 58 kg	1
Iran	Mehdi Khodabakhshi	April 21, 1991 (aged 25)	(Iran) Eslamshahr	Men's 80 kg	1
Iran	Sajjad Mardani	July 1, 1988 (aged 28)	(Iran) Shahr-e Kord	Men's +80 kg	3
Israel	Ron Atias	April 19, 1995 (aged 21)	(Israel)	Men's 58 kg	48
Ivory Coast	Cheick Sallah Cisse	September 19, 1993 (aged 22)	(Ivory Coast)	Men's 80 kg	3
Jordan	Ahmad Abu-Ghaush		(Jordan)	Men's 68 kg	40
Kazakhstan	Ruslan Zhaparov	May 27, 1996 (aged 20)	(Kazakhstan)	Men's +80 kg	49
Libya	Yousef Shriha		(Libya)	Men's 58 kg	45
Mali	Ismaël Coulibaly	November 20, 1992 (aged 23)	(Mali) Bamako	Men's 80 kg	14
Mexico	Carlos Navarro	May 8, 1996 (aged 20)	(Mexico)	Men's 58 kg	5
Mexico	Saúl Gutiérrez	December 28, 1992 (aged 23)	(Mexico) (Michoacán) Lázaro Cárdenas	Men's 68 kg	3
Moldova	Aaron Cook	January 2, 1991 (aged 25)	(United Kingdom) Dorchester	Men's 80 kg	2
Mongolia	Pürevjavyn Temüüjin	June 2, 1994 (aged 22)	(Mongolia)	Men's 68 kg	112
Morocco	Omar Hajjami		(Morocco)	Men's 58 kg	80
Niger	Abdoul Razak Issoufou		(Niger)	Men's +80 kg	14
Papua New Guinea	Maxemillion Kassman		(Papua New Guinea)	Men's 68 kg	285
Poland	Karol Robak	August 24, 1997 (aged 18)	(Poland)	Men's 68 kg	17
Poland	Piotr Paziński	September 7, 1987 (aged 28)	(Poland)	Men's 80 kg	23
Portugal	Rui Bragança	December 26, 1991 (aged 24)	(Portugal) Creixomil	Men's 58 kg	4
Russia	Aleksey Denisenko	August 30, 1993 (aged 22)	(Russia)	Men's 68 kg	4
Russia	Albert Gaun	June 21, 1992 (aged 24)	(Russia) (Altai Krai) Barnaul	Men's 80 kg	4
Senegal	Balla Dièye	November 13, 1980 (aged 35)	(Senegal)	Men's 68 kg	578
South Korea	Kim Tae-hun	August 15, 1994 (aged 21)	(South Korea)	Men's 58 kg	2
South Korea	Lee Dae-hoon	February 5, 1992 (aged 24)	(South Korea) Seoul	Men's 68 kg	2
South Korea	Cha Dong-min	August 24, 1986 (aged 29)	(South Korea) Seoul	Men's +80 kg	7
Spain	Jesús Tortosa	December 21, 1997 (aged 18)	(Spain) Madrid	Men's 58 kg	13
Spain	Joel González	September 30, 1989 (aged 26)	(Spain) Figueres	Men's 68 kg	6
Thailand	Tawin Hanprab	August 1, 1998 (aged 18)	(Thailand)	Men's 58 kg	64
Tonga	Pita Taufatofua	November 5, 1983 (aged 32)	(Tonga)	Men's +80 kg	157
Tunisia	Oussama Oueslati	March 24, 1996 (aged 20)	(Tunisia)	Men's 80 kg	17
Tunisia	Yassine Trabelsi	July 12, 1990 (aged 26)	(Tunisia)	Men's +80 kg	9
Turkey	Servet Tazegül	September 26, 1988 (aged 27)	(Turkey)	Men's 68 kg	5
United States	Steven López	November 9, 1978 (aged 37)	(United States) (Texas) Sugar Land	Men's 80 kg	21
United States	Stephen Lambdin	March 9, 1988 (aged 28)	(United States) (Texas) Colleyville	Men's +80 kg	19
Uzbekistan	Nikita Rafalovich	October 10, 1993 (aged 22)	(Uzbekistan)	Men's 80 kg	10
Uzbekistan	Dmitriy Shokin	May 30, 1992 (aged 24)	(Uzbekistan)	Men's +80 kg	1
Venezuela	Edgar Contreras	July 16, 1992 (aged 24)	(Venezuela)	Men's 68 kg	92

== Female taekwondo practitioners ==
NOC	Name	Age	Hometown	Event	Olympic Ranking
Aruba	Monica Pimentel	January 7, 1989 (aged 27)	(Aruba)	Women's 49 kg	48
Australia	Caroline Marton	April 14, 1984 (aged 32)	(Australia) (Victoria (state)) Melbourne	Women's 57 kg	23
Australia	Carmen Marton	June 30, 1986 (aged 30)	(Australia) (Victoria (state)) Melbourne	Women's 67 kg	21
Azerbaijan	Patimat Abakarova	October 23, 1994 (aged 21)	(Azerbaijan)	Women's 49 kg	21
Azerbaijan	Farida Azizova	June 6, 1995 (aged 21)	(Azerbaijan) Qusar	Women's 67 kg	14
Belgium	Raheleh Asemani	June 21, 1989 (aged 27)	(Belgium)	Women's 57 kg	20
Brazil	Iris Sing	August 21, 1990 (aged 25)	(Brazil)	Women's 49 kg	6
Brazil	Júlia Vasconcelos	June 15, 1992 (aged 24)	(Brazil)	Women's 57 kg	24
Cambodia	Sorn Seavmey	July 14, 1995 (aged 21)	(Cambodia) Phnom Penh	Women's +67 kg	33
Canada	Melissa Pagnotta	September 22, 1988 (aged 27)	(Canada)	Women's 67 kg	15
Cape Verde	Maria Andrade	March 19, 1993 (aged 23)	(Cape Verde)	Women's 49 kg	129
China	Wu Jingyu	February 1, 1987 (aged 29)	(China) Jingdezhen	Women's 49 kg	1
China	Zheng Shuyin	May 1, 1994 (aged 22)	(China)	Women's +67 kg	2
Chinese Taipei	Huang Huai-hsuan	July 7, 1997 (aged 19)	(Chinese Taipei)	Women's 49 kg	243
Chinese Taipei	Chuang Chia-chia	May 13, 1989 (aged 27)	(Chinese Taipei)	Women's 67 kg	3
Colombia	Doris Patiño	May 1, 1986 (aged 30)	(Colombia) Boyacá	Women's 57 kg	40
Croatia	Lucija Zaninović	June 26, 1987 (aged 29)	(Croatia) Split	Women's 49 kg	3
Croatia	Ana Zaninović	June 26, 1987 (aged 29)	(Croatia) Split	Women's 57 kg	6
Dominican Republic	Katherine Rodríguez	December 18, 1991 (aged 24)	(Dominican Republic) Santiago de los Caballeros	Women's +67 kg	20
Democratic Republic of the Congo	Rosa Keleku	January 16, 1995 (aged 21)	(Democratic Republic of the Congo)	Women's 49 kg	52
Egypt	Hedaya Malak	April 21, 1993 (aged 23)	(Egypt)	Women's 57 kg	3
Egypt	Seham El-Sawalhy	April 14, 1991 (aged 25)	(Egypt) Beheira	Women's 67 kg	11
Finland	Suvi Mikkonen	July 11, 1988 (aged 28)	(Spain) Madrid	Women's 57 kg	33
France	Yasmina Aziez	January 23, 1991 (aged 25)	(France)	Women's 49 kg	5
France	Haby Niaré	June 26, 1993 (aged 23)	(France) Mantes-la-Jolie	Women's 67 kg	1
France	Gwladys Épangue	August 15, 1983 (aged 32)	(France) Clichy-la-Garenne	Women's +67 kg	8
Germany	Rabia Gülec	June 5, 1994 (aged 22)	(Germany)	Women's 67 kg	16
Great Britain	Jade Jones	March 21, 1993 (aged 23)	(United Kingdom) Flint	Women's 57 kg	1
Great Britain	Bianca Walkden	September 29, 1991 (aged 24)	(United Kingdom) Liverpool	Women's +67 kg	3
Haiti	Aniya Louissaint	September 9, 1998 (aged 17)	(Haiti)	Women's 67 kg	120
Iran	Kimia Alizadeh	July 10, 1998 (aged 18)	(Iran) Karaj	Women's 57 kg	21
Ivory Coast	Ruth Gbagbi	February 7, 1994 (aged 22)	(Ivory Coast) Abidjan	Women's 67 kg	13
Ivory Coast	Mamina Koné	December 27, 1988 (aged 27)	(Ivory Coast)	Women's +67 kg	26
Japan	Mayu Hamada	January 31, 1994 (aged 22)	(Japan)	Women's 57 kg	5
Kazakhstan	Ainur Yesbergenova	February 11, 1998 (aged 18)	(Kazakhstan)	Women's 49 kg	125
Kazakhstan	Cansel Deniz	August 26, 1991 (aged 24)	(Kazakhstan)	Women's 67 kg	51
Mexico	Itzel Manjarrez	April 10, 1990 (aged 26)	(Mexico)	Women's 49 kg	4
Mexico	María Espinoza	November 27, 1987 (aged 28)	(Mexico) (Sinaloa) La Brecha	Women's +67 kg	1
Morocco	Hakima El-Meslahy	March 17, 1988 (aged 28)	(Morocco)	Women's 57 kg	118
Morocco	Wiam Dislam	October 22, 1987 (aged 28)	(Morocco) Rabat	Women's +67 kg	21
Nepal	Nisha Rawal	September 11, 1995 (aged 20)	(Nepal) Kathmandu	Women's +67 kg	289
Netherlands	Reshmie Oogink	October 26, 1989 (aged 26)	(Nepal) Kathmandu	Women's +67 kg	5
New Zealand	Andrea Kilday	August 5, 1982 (aged 34)	(New Zealand)	Women's 49 kg	74
Norway	Tina Skaar	August 31, 1993 (aged 22)	(Norway)	Women's +67 kg	31
Panama	Carolena Carstens	January 18, 1996 (aged 20)	(Spain)	Women's 57 kg	15
Papua New Guinea	Samantha Kassman	January 23, 1984 (aged 32)	(Papua New Guinea)	Women's +67 kg	99
Peru	Julissa Diez	July 5, 1989 (aged 27)	(Peru)	Women's 49 kg	28
Philippines	Kirstie Alora	November 25, 1989 (aged 26)	(Philippines)	Women's +67 kg	61
Puerto Rico	Crystal Weekes	January 14, 1998 (aged 18)	(Puerto Rico)	Women's +67 kg	46
Russia	Anastasia Baryshnikova	December 19, 1990 (aged 25)	(Russia)	Women's 67 kg	5
Serbia	Tijana Bogdanović	May 5, 1998 (aged 18)	(Serbia) Kruševac	Women's 49 kg	13
Serbia	Milica Mandić	December 6, 1991 (aged 24)	(Serbia) Belgrade	Women's +67 kg	7
South Korea	Kim So-hui	January 29, 1994 (aged 22)	(South Korea) Jecheon	Women's 49 kg	10
South Korea	Oh Hye-ri	March 30, 1988 (aged 28)	(South Korea)	Women's 67 kg	6
Spain	Eva Calvo	July 28, 1991 (aged 25)	(Spain)	Women's 57 kg	2
Sweden	Nikita Glasnović	January 17, 1995 (aged 21)	(Sweden)	Women's 57 kg	4
Sweden	Elin Johansson	August 5, 1990 (aged 26)	(Sweden) Skellefteå	Women's 67 kg	2
Thailand	Panipak Wongpattanakit	August 1, 1997 (aged 19)	(Thailand)	Women's 49 kg	2
Thailand	Phannapa Harnsujin	September 14, 1997 (aged 18)	(Thailand)	Women's 57 kg	64
Tunisia	Rahma Ben Ali	September 15, 1993 (aged 22)	(Tunisia)	Women's 57 kg	22
Turkey	Nur Tatar	August 16, 1992 (aged 23)	(Turkey) Van	Women's 67 kg	4
United States	Paige McPherson	October 1, 1990 (aged 25)	(United States) (South Dakota) Sturgis	Women's 67 kg	10
United States	Jackie Galloway	December 27, 1995 (aged 20)	(United States) (Texas) Wylie	Women's +67 kg	4
Uzbekistan	Nigora Tursunkulova	April 4, 1999 (aged 17)	(Uzbekistan)	Women's 67 kg	93
