= 2016 Summer Olympics closing ceremony flag bearers =

During the closing ceremony of the 2016 Summer Olympics in Rio de Janeiro, the flag bearers of 207 National Olympic Committees (NOCs) arrived into Maracanã Stadium. The flags of each country were not necessarily carried by the same flag bearer as in the opening ceremony.

== Countries and flagbearers ==
The following is a list of each country's flag bearer. The list is sorted by the order in which each nation appears in the parade of nations. Names are given as were officially designated by the International Olympic Committee (IOC).

No.	Country	Brazilian Portuguese name	Flag bearer	Sport
1	Greece	Grécia	Ekaterini Stefanidi	Athletics
2	Afghanistan	Afeganistão	Volunteer	
3	South Africa	África do Sul	Caster Semenya	Athletics
4	Albania	Albânia	Luiza Gega	Athletics
5	Germany	Alemanha	Sebastian Brendel	Canoeing
6	Andorra	Andorra	Pol Moya	Athletics
7	Angola	Angola	Cristina Direito Branco	Handball
8	Antigua and Barbuda	Antígua e Barbuda	Noah Mascoll-Gomes	Swimming
9	Saudi Arabia	Arábia Saudita	Volunteer	
10	Algeria	Argélia	Larbi Bourrada	Athletics
11	Argentina	Argentina	Paula Pareto	Judo
12	Armenia	Armênia	Artur Aleksanyan	Wrestling
13	Aruba	Aruba	Nicole Van der Velden	Sailing
14	Independent Olympic Athletes	Atletas Olímpicos Independentes	Volunteer	
15	Australia	Austrália	Kim Brennan	Rowing
16	Austria	Áustria	Thomas Zajac and Tanja Frank	Sailing
17	Azerbaijan	Azerbaijão	Haji Aliyev	Wrestling
18	Bahamas	Bahamas	Leevan Sands	Athletics
19	Bangladesh	Bangladesh	Shamoli Ray	Archery
20	Barbados	Barbados	Akela Jones	Athletics
21	Bahrain	Bareine	Alemu Bekele	Athletics
22	Belarus	Belarus	Ivan Tsikhan	Athletics
23	Belgium	Bélgica	Nafissatou Thiam	Athletics
24	Belize	Belize	Brandon Jones	Athletics
25	Benin	Benim	Yemi Geoffrey Apithy	Fencing
26	Bermuda	Bermuda	Volunteer	
27	Bolivia	Bolívia	Ángela Castro	Athletics
28	Bosnia and Herzegovina	Bósnia e Herzegovina	Amel Tuka	Athletics
29	Botswana	Botsuana	Isaac Makwala	Athletics
30	Brunei	Brunei Darussalam	Maizurah Abdul Rahim	Athletics
31	Bulgaria	Bulgária	Mihaela Maevska	Gymnastics
32	Burkina Faso	Burkina Faso	Angelika Sita Ouedraogo	Swimming
33	Burundi	Burundi	Billy Scott Irakoze	Swimming
34	Bhutan	Butão	Lenchu Kunzang	Shooting
35	Cape Verde	Cabo Verde	Maria Andrade	Taekwondo
36	Cameroon	Camarões	Dieudonne Wilfried Seyi Ntsengue	Boxing
37	Cambodia	Camboja	Sorn Seavmey	Taekwondo
38	Canada	Canadá	Penny Oleksiak	Swimming
39	Qatar	Catar	Volunteer	
40	Kazakhstan	Cazaquistão	Ruslan Zhaparov	Taekwondo
41	Cayman Islands	Ilhas Cayman	Lara Butler	Swimming
42	Central African Republic	República Centro-Africana	Chloe Marie Helene Sauvourel	Swimming
43	Chad	Chade	Bibiro Ali Tahar	Athletics
44	Chile	Chile	Bárbara Riveros	Triathlon
45	China	República Popular da China	Ding Ning	Table Tennis
46	Cyprus	Chipre	Leontia Kallenou	Athletics
47	Colombia	Colômbia	Ingrit Valencia	Boxing
48	Comoros	Comores	Soule Soilihi Athoumane	Swimming
49	Republic of the Congo	Congo	Franck Elemba	Athletics
50	Democratic Republic of the Congo	República Democrática do Congo	Volunteer	
51	Cook Islands	Ilhas Cook	Alex Beddoes	Athletics
52	South Korea	República da Coreia	Kim Hyeon-woo	Wrestling
53	Ivory Coast	Costa do Marfim	Rene Philippe Kouassi	Archery
54	Costa Rica	Costa Rica	Karen Cope Charles	Beach volleyball
55	Croatia	Croácia	Valent Sinkovic and Martin Sinkovic	Rowing
56	Cuba	Cuba	Mijaín López	Wrestling
57	Denmark	Dinamarca	Pernille Blume	Swimming
58	Djibouti	Djibuti	Mohamed Ismail Ibrahim	Athletics
59	Dominica	Dominica	Yordanys Durañona	Athletics
60	Dominican Republic	República Dominicana	Luisito Pié	Taekwondo
61	Egypt	Egito	Hedaya Malak	Taekwondo
62	El Salvador	El Salvador	Enrique Arathoon	Sailing
63	United Arab Emirates	Emirados Árabes Unidos	Saud Alzaabi	Athletics
64	Ecuador	Equador	Bayron Piedra	Athletics
65	Eritrea	Eritreia	Tsegay Tuemay	Athletics
66	Slovakia	Eslováquia	Erik Vlček	Canoeing
67	Slovenia	Eslovênia	Tanja Zakelj	Cycling
68	Spain	Espanha	Jesús Ángel García Bragado	Athletics
69	Federated States of Micronesia	Estados Federados da Micronésia	Volunteer	
70	United States	Estados Unidos da América	Simone Biles	Gymnastics
71	Estonia	Estônia	Mart Seim	Weightlifting
72	Ethiopia	Etiópia	Almaz Ayana	Athletics
73	Macedonia	Ex-República Iugoslava da Macedônia	Volunteer	
74	Fiji	Fiji	Leslie Copeland	Athletics
75	Philippines	Filipinas	Kirstie Elaine Alora	Taekwondo
76	Finland	Finlândia	Antti Ruuskanen	Athletics
77	France	França	Teddy Riner	Judo
78	Gabon	Gabão	Anthony Mylann Obame	Taekwondo
79	The Gambia	Gâmbia	Gina Bass	Athletics
80	Ghana	Gana	Flings Owusu-Agyapong	Athletics
81	Georgia	Geórgia	Lasha Talakhadze	Weightlifting
82	Great Britain	Grã-Bretanha	Kate Richardson-Walsh	Field hockey
83	Grenada	Granada	Lindon Victor	Athletics
84	Guam	Guam	Benjamin Schulte	Swimming
85	Guatemala	Guatemala	Juan Ignacio Maegli	Sailing
86	Guyana	Guiana	Troy Doris	Athletics
87	Guinea	Guiné	Mamadama Bangoura	Judo
88	Equatorial Guinea	Guiné Equatorial	Reïna-Flor Okori	Athletics
89	Guinea-Bissau	Guiné-Bissau	Taciana Lima	Judo
90	Haiti	Haiti	Jeffrey Julmis	Athletics
91	Honduras	Honduras	Miguel Ferrera	Taekwondo
92	Hong Kong	Hong Kong, China	Chan Chun Hing	Cycling
93	Hungary	Hungria	Katinka Hosszú	Swimming
94	Yemen	Iêmen	Volunteer	
95	India	Índia	Sakshi Malik	Wrestling
96	Indonesia	Indonésia	Volunteer	
97	Iran	República Islâmica do Irã	Hassan Yazdani	Wrestling
98	Iraq	Iraque	Volunteer	
99	Ireland	Irlanda	Gary O'Donovan	Rowing
100	Iceland	Islândia	Hrafnhildur Luthersdottir	Swimming
101	Israel	Israel	Alona Koshevatskiy	Gymnastics
102	Italy	Itália	Daniele Lupo	Beach volleyball
103	Jamaica	Jamaica	Javon Francis	Athletics
104	Japan	Japão	Keisuke Ushiro	Athletics
105	Jordan	Jordânia	Ahmad Abughoush	Taekwondo
106	Kiribati	Kiribati	Volunteer	
107	Kosovo	Kosovo	Vijona Kryeziu	Athletics
108	Laos	República Popular Democrática do Laos	Xaysa Anousone	Athletics
109	Lesotho	Lesoto	Inkululeko Suntele	Boxing
110	Latvia	Letônia	Aleksejs Rumjancevs	Canoeing
111	Lebanon	Líbano	Volunteer	
112	Liberia	Libéria	Emmanuel Matadi	Athletics
113	Libya	Líbia	Volunteer	
114	Liechtenstein	Liechtenstein	Christoph Meier	Swimming
115	Lithuania	Lituânia	Edvinas Ramanauskas	Canoeing
116	Luxembourg	Luxemburgo	Ni Xialian	Table Tennis
117	Madagascar	Madagascar	Asaramanitra Ratiarison	Judo
118	Malaysia	Malásia	Lee Chong Wei	Badminton
119	Malawi	Maláui	Kefasi Chitsala	Athletics
120	Maldives	Maldivas	Afa Isimail	Athletics
121	Mali	Mali	Ismael Coulibaly	Taekwondo
122	Malta	Malta	Charlotte Wingfield	Athletics
123	Marshall Islands	Ilhas Marshall	Colleen Furgeson	Swimming
124	Morocco	Marrocos	Wiam Dislam	Taekwondo
125	Mauritius	Maurício	Jonathan Drack	Athletics
126	Mauritania	Mauritânia	Volunteer	
127	Mexico	México	Maria Del Rosario Espinoza	Taekwondo
128	Mozambique	Moçambique	Joaquim Lobo	Canoeing
129	Moldova	República da Moldova	Zalina Marghieva	Athletics
130	Monaco	Mônaco	Volunteer	
131	Mongolia	Mongólia	Dorjnyambuugiin Otgondalai	Boxing
132	Montenegro	Montenegro	Predrag Jokic	Water polo
133	Myanmar	Myanmar	Yan Naing Soe	Judo
134	Namibia	Namíbia	Michelle Vorster	Cycling
135	Nauru	Nauru	Ovini Uera	Judo
136	Nepal	Nepal	Saraswati Bhattarai	Athletics
137	Nicaragua	Nicarágua	Erick Rodríguez	Athletics
138	Niger	Níger	Issoufou Alfaga Abdoulrazak	Taekwondo
139	Nigeria	Nigéria	Doreen Amata	Athletics
140	Norway	Noruega	Kari Aalvik Grimsbø	Handball
141	New Zealand	Nova Zelândia	Lisa Carrington	Canoeing
142	Oman	Omã	Volunteer	
143	Netherlands	Países Baixos	Sanne Wevers	Gymnastics
144	Palau	Palau	Skilang Temengil	Wrestling
145	Palestine	Palestina	Miri Alatrash	Swimming
146	Panama	Panamá	Carolena Carstens	Taekwondo
147	Papua New Guinea	Papua Nova Guiné	Samantha Kassman	Taekwondo
148	Pakistan	Paquistão	Volunteer	
149	Paraguay	Paraguai	Carmen Martinez	Athletics
150	Peru	Peru	David Torrence	Athletics
151	Poland	Polônia	Marta Walczykiewicz	Canoeing
152	Puerto Rico	Porto Rico	Jaime Yusept Espinal	Wrestling
153	Portugal	Portugal	Telma Monteiro	Judo
154	Kenya	Quênia	Mercy Cherono	Athletics
155	Kyrgyzstan	Quirguistão	Aisuluu Tynybekova	Wrestling
156	North Korea	República Popular Democrática da Coreia	Yun Won Chol	Wrestling
157	Romania	Romênia	Simona Pop	Fencing
158	Rwanda	Ruanda	Claudette Mukasakindi	Athletics
159	Russia	Federação da Rússia	Svetlana Romashina and Natalia Ishchenko	Synchronized swimming
160	Solomon Islands	Ilhas Salomão	Rosefelo Siosi	Athletics
161	Samoa	Samoa	Alex Rose	Athletics
162	American Samoa	Samoa Americana	Benjamin Waterhouse	Judo
163	San Marino	San Marino	Alessandra Perilli	Shooting
164	Saint Lucia	Santa Lúcia	Jeanelle Scheper	Athletics
165	Saint Kitts and Nevis	São Cristóvão e Névis	Antoine Adams	Athletics
166	São Tomé and Príncipe	São Tomé e Príncipe	Volunteer	
167	Saint Vincent and the Grenadines	São Vicente e Granadinas	Kineke Alexander	Athletics
168	Seychelles	Seicheles	Lissa Labiche	Athletics
169	Senegal	Senegal	Adama Diatta	Wrestling
170	Sierra Leone	Serra Leoa	Hafsatu Kamara	Athletics
171	Serbia	Sérvia	Tijana Bogdanović	Taekwondo
172	Singapore	Singapura	Griselda Khng	Sailing
173	Syria	República Árabe da Síria	Ghofrane Mohamed	Athletics
174	Somalia	Somália	Mohamed Daud Mohamed	Athletics
175	Sri Lanka	Sri Lanka	Anuradha Indrajith Cooray	Athletics
176	Swaziland	Suazilândia	Phumlile Ndzinisa	Athletics
177	Sudan	Sudão	Volunteer	
178	South Sudan	Sudão do Sul	Guor Marial	Athletics
179	Sweden	Suécia	Emma Johansson	Cycling
180	Switzerland	Suíça	Nino Schurter	Mountain Biking
181	Suriname	Suriname	Volunteer	
182	Tajikistan	Tadjiquistão	Anvar Yunusov	Boxing
183	Thailand	Tailândia	Boonthung Srisung	Athletics
184	Chinese Taipei	Taipé Chinesa	Hsu Shu-Ching	Weightlifting
185	Tanzania	República Unida da Tanzânia	Alphonce Felix Simbu	Athletics
186	Czech Republic	República Tcheca	Josef Dostál	Canoeing
187	Timor-Leste	República Democrática de Timor-Leste	Augusto Soares	Athletics
188	Togo	Togo	Adzo Rebecca Kpossi	Swimming
189	Tonga	Tonga	Siueni Filimone	Athletics
190	Trinidad and Tobago	Trinidad e Tobago	Cleopatra Borel	Athletics
191	Tunisia	Tunísia	Oussama Oueslati	Taekwondo
192	Turkmenistan	Turcomenistão	Volunteer	
193	Turkey	Turquia	Taha Akgul	Wrestling
194	Tuvalu	Tuvalu	Volunteer	
195	Ukraine	Ucrânia	Olga Kharlan	Fencing
196	Uganda	Uganda	Halima Nakaayi	Athletics
197	Uruguay	Uruguai	Emiliano Lasa	Athletics
198	Uzbekistan	Uzbequistão	Bektemir Melikuziev	Boxing
199	Vanuatu	Vanuatu	Volunteer	
200	Venezuela	Venezuela	Stefany Hernández	Cycling
201	Vietnam	Vietnã	Volunteer	
202	Virgin Islands	Ilhas Virgens Americanas	Clayton Laurent Jr.	Boxing
203	British Virgin Islands	Ilhas Virgens Britânicas	Volunteer	
204	Zambia	Zâmbia	Gerald Phiri	Athletics
205	Zimbabwe	Zimbábue	Kirsty Coventry	Swimming
206	Refugee Olympic Team	Time Olímpico de Refugiados	Popole Misenga	Judo
207	Brazil	Brasil	Isaquias Queiroz	Canoeing
