= Taekwondo at the 2016 Summer Olympics =

Taekwondo at the Games of the XXXI Olympiad
- Venue: Carioca Arena 3
- Dates: 17–20 August 2016
- No. of events: 8
- Competitors: 128 from 63 nations

Taekwondo at the 2016 Summer Olympics in Rio de Janeiro took place from 17 to 20 August at the Carioca Arena 3 inside the Barra Olympic Park in Barra da Tijuca. Around 128 taekwondo fighters competed in eight weight categories; four for men, and four for women.

== Qualification ==
Taekwondo competition at these Games featured a total of 128 athletes, 64 in each gender, and 16 in each of the eight weight categories. Each National Olympic Committee (NOC) was allowed to enter up to a maximum of eight competitors, four of each gender, based on the World Taekwondo Federation (WTF) Olympic rankings, such that an athlete per NOC must be among the top six in each weight category. If an NOC had qualified only two female and male athletes through ranking, it could not participate in the respective Continental Qualification Tournament unless it had relinquishing the places obtained through ranking.

Four places had been reserved to the host nation Brazil, and another four had been invited by the Tripartite Commission. The remaining 120 places were allocated through a qualification process in which athletes had won quota place for their respective NOC. 48 taekwondo fighters, 24 in each gender and the top 6 in each weight category, were eligible to compete through the ITTF Olympic rankings, while the rest through the five Continental Qualification Tournaments.

If an NOC having qualified through a Qualification Tournament relinquishing a quota place, it would be allocated to the nation of the next highest placed athlete in the respective weight category of that tournament as long as the addition of the place did not exceed the maximum quota for that nation.

== Schedule ==
Daily schedule
Date →	Wed 17	Thu 18	Fri 19	Sat 20
Men's	58 kg	68 kg	80 kg	+80 kg
Women's	49 kg	57 kg	67 kg	+67 kg

== Participating ==
=== Participating nations ===
- Aruba (1)
- Australia (4)
- Azerbaijan (4)
- Belarus (1)
- Belgium (3)
- Brazil (4)
- Cambodia (1)
- Canada (1)
- Cape Verde (1)
- Central African Republic (1)
- Chile (1)
- China (4)
- Colombia (2)
- Croatia (3)
- Cuba (1)
- Dominican Republic (3)
- Democratic Republic of the Congo (1)
- Egypt (3)
- Finland (1)
- France (4)
- Gabon (1)
- Germany (3)
- Great Britain (4)
- Haiti (1)
- Honduras (1)
- Iran (4)
- Israel (1)
- Ivory Coast (3)
- Japan (1)
- Jordan (1)
- Kazakhstan (3)
- Libya (1)
- Mali (1)
- Mexico (4)
- Moldova (1)
- Mongolia (1)
- Morocco (3)
- Nepal (1)
- Netherlands (1)
- New Zealand (1)
- Niger (1)
- Norway (1)
- Panama (1)
- Papua New Guinea (2)
- Peru (1)
- Philippines (1)
- Poland (2)
- Portugal (1)
- Puerto Rico (1)
- Russia (3)
- Senegal (1)
- Serbia (2)
- South Korea (5)
- Spain (3)
- Sweden (2)
- Chinese Taipei (3)
- Thailand (3)
- Tonga (1)
- Tunisia (3)
- Turkey (2)
- United States (4)
- Uzbekistan (3)
- Venezuela (1)

== Medal summary ==
After finishing in third in 2012, this Olympics marks South Korea's return to the top of the Taekwondo medal standings.

=== Medal table ===
* Host nation (Brazil)

Rank	Nation	Gold	Silver	Bronze	Total
1	South Korea	2	0	3	5
2	China	2	0	0	2
3	Great Britain	1	1	1	3
4	Azerbaijan	1	0	2	3
5	Ivory Coast	1	0	1	2
6	Jordan	1	0	0	1
7	Spain	0	1	1	2
7	Thailand	0	1	1	2
9	France	0	1	0	1
9	Mexico	0	1	0	1
9	Niger	0	1	0	1
9	Russia	0	1	0	1
9	Serbia	0	1	0	1
14	Brazil*	0	0	1	1
14	Dominican Republic	0	0	1	1
14	Egypt	0	0	1	1
14	Iran	0	0	1	1
14	Tunisia	0	0	1	1
14	Turkey	0	0	1	1
14	United States	0	0	1	1
Totals (20 entries)		8	8	16	32

=== Men's events ===
Event	Gold	Silver	Bronze
Flyweight (58 kg)	Zhao Shuai; China	Tawin Hanprab; Thailand	Luisito Pie; Dominican Republic
Flyweight (58 kg)	Zhao Shuai; China	Tawin Hanprab; Thailand	Kim Tae-hun; South Korea
Featherweight (68 kg)	Ahmad Abughaush; Jordan	Alexey Denisenko; Russia	Lee Dae-hoon; South Korea
Featherweight (68 kg)	Ahmad Abughaush; Jordan	Alexey Denisenko; Russia	Joel González; Spain
Welterweight (80 kg)	Cheick Sallah Cissé; Ivory Coast	Lutalo Muhammad; Great Britain	Milad Beigi; Azerbaijan
Welterweight (80 kg)	Cheick Sallah Cissé; Ivory Coast	Lutalo Muhammad; Great Britain	Oussama Oueslati; Tunisia
Heavyweight (+80 kg)	Radik Isayev; Azerbaijan	Abdoul Razak Issoufou; Niger	Maicon Siqueira; Brazil
Heavyweight (+80 kg)	Radik Isayev; Azerbaijan	Abdoul Razak Issoufou; Niger	Cha Dong-min; South Korea

=== Women's events ===
Event	Gold	Silver	Bronze
Flyweight (49 kg)	Kim So-hui; South Korea	Tijana Bogdanović; Serbia	Patimat Abakarova; Azerbaijan
Flyweight (49 kg)	Kim So-hui; South Korea	Tijana Bogdanović; Serbia	Panipak Wongpattanakit; Thailand
Featherweight (57 kg)	Jade Jones; Great Britain	Eva Calvo; Spain	Hedaya Malak; Egypt
Featherweight (57 kg)	Jade Jones; Great Britain	Eva Calvo; Spain	Kimia Alizadeh; Iran
Welterweight (67 kg)	Oh Hye-ri; South Korea	Haby Niaré; France	Ruth Gbagbi; Ivory Coast
Welterweight (67 kg)	Oh Hye-ri; South Korea	Haby Niaré; France	Nur Tatar; Turkey
Heavyweight (+67 kg)	Zheng Shuyin; China	María Espinoza; Mexico	Bianca Walkden; Great Britain
Heavyweight (+67 kg)	Zheng Shuyin; China	María Espinoza; Mexico	Jackie Galloway; United States
