= Fencing at the 2016 Summer Olympics – Women's épée =

Women's épée at the Games of the XXXI Olympiad
- Venue: Carioca Arena 3
- Date: 6 August 2016
- Competitors: 37 from 19 nations

Medalists
1st place, gold medalist(s)		Emese Szász	Hungary
2nd place, silver medalist(s)		Rossella Fiamingo	Italy
3rd place, bronze medalist(s)		Sun Yiwen	China

The women's épée competition in fencing at the 2016 Summer Olympics in Rio de Janeiro was held on 6 August at the Carioca Arena 3.

For the victory ceremony the medals for the competition were presented by Claudia Bokel, Germany, member of the International Olympic Committee, and the gifts were presented by Giorgio Scarso, Vice President of the FIE.

== Results ==
=== Finals ===
Semi-finals
Sun Yiwen (CHN)	11
Rossella Fiamingo (ITA)	12
Emese Szász (HUN)	10
Lauren Rembi (FRA)	6

Final
Rossella Fiamingo (ITA)	13
Emese Szász (HUN)	15
Bronze medal match
Sun Yiwen (CHN)	15
Lauren Rembi (FRA)	13

=== Top half ===
==== Section 1 ====
Round of 37
Rayssa Costa (BRA)	15
Tiffany Géroudet (SUI)	13

Round of 32
Sarra Besbes (TUN)	15
Rayssa Costa (BRA)	8
Katharine Holmes (USA)	4
Erika Kirpu (EST)	5
Irina Embrich (EST)	15
Kseniya Pantelyeyeva (UKR)	3
Gbahi Gwladys Sakoa (CIV)	11
Sun Yiwen (CHN)	15

Round of 16
Sarra Besbes (TUN)	15
Erika Kirpu (EST)	11
Irina Embrich (EST)	12
Sun Yiwen (CHN)	15

Quarter-finals
Sarra Besbes (TUN)	11
Sun Yiwen (CHN)	14

==== Section 2 ====
Round of 37
Nguyễn Thị Như Hoa (VIE)	7
Auriane Mallo (FRA)	15
Simona Pop (ROU)	10
Leonora Mackinnon (CAN)	15

Round of 32
Ana Maria Brânză (ROU)	15
Auriane Mallo (FRA)	8
Choi In-jeong (KOR)	15
Violetta Kolobova (RUS)	12
Vivian Kong (HKG)	15
Lyubov Shutova (RUS)	10
Leonora Mackinnon (CAN)	8
Rossella Fiamingo (ITA)	15

Round of 16
Ana Maria Brânză (ROU)	8
Choi In-jeong (KOR)	15
Vivian Kong (HKG)	11
Rossella Fiamingo (ITA)	15

Quarter-finals
Choi In-jeong (KOR)	8
Rossella Fiamingo (ITA)	15

=== Bottom half ===
==== Section 3 ====
Round of 37
Alejandra Terán (MEX)	12
Nozomi Nakano (JPN)	15

Round of 32
Tatiana Logunova (RUS)	14
Nozomi Nakano (JPN)	15
Yana Shemyakina (UKR)	14
Courtney Hurley (USA)	13
Sun Yujie (CHN)	10
Kang Young-mi (KOR)	15
Julia Beljajeva (EST)	11
Emese Szász (HUN)	15

Round of 16
Nozomi Nakano (JPN)	11
Yana Shemyakina (UKR)	8
Kang Young-mi (KOR)	11
Emese Szász (HUN)	15

Quarter-finals
Nozomi Nakano (JPN)	4
Emese Szász (HUN)	15

==== Section 4 ====
Round of 37
M.-F. Candassamy (FRA)	15
Amanda Simeão (BRA)	6

Round of 32
Simona Gherman (ROU)	10
Lauren Rembi (FRA)	13
Olena Kryvytska (UKR)	15
Shin A-lam (KOR)	14
Kelley Hurley (USA)	12
Nathalie Moellhausen (BRA)	15
M.-F. Candassamy (FRA)	15
Xu Anqi (CHN)	8

Round of 16
Lauren Rembi (FRA)	9
Olena Kryvytska (UKR)	7
Nathalie Moellhausen (BRA)	15
M.-F. Candassamy (FRA)	12

Quarter-finals
Lauren Rembi (FRA)	15
Nathalie Moellhausen (BRA)	12

== Results ==
Rank	Fencer	Country
1st place, gold medalist(s)	Emese Szász	Hungary
2nd place, silver medalist(s)	Rossella Fiamingo	Italy
3rd place, bronze medalist(s)	Sun Yiwen	China
4	Lauren Rembi	France
5	Sarra Besbes	Tunisia
6	Nathalie Moellhausen	Brazil
7	Choi In-jeong	South Korea
8	Nozomi Sato	Japan
9	Ana Maria Brânză	Romania
10	Irina Embrich	Estonia
11	Man Wai Vivian Kong	Hong Kong
12	Erika Kirpu	Estonia
13	Yana Shemyakina	Ukraine
14	Young Mi Kang	South Korea
15	Olena Kryvytska	Ukraine
16	Marie-Florence Candassamy	France
17	Anqi Xu	China
18	Tatiana Logunova	Russia
19	Simona Gherman	Romania
20	Shin A-lam	South Korea
21	Sun Yujie	China
22	Violetta Kolobova	Russia
23	Courtney Hurley	United States
24	Kelley Hurley	United States
25	Katharine Holmes	United States
26	Lyubov Shutova	Russia
27	Kseniya Pantelyeyeva	Ukraine
28	Gbahi Gwladys Sakoa	Ivory Coast
29	Julia Beljajeva	Estonia
30	Auriane Mallo	France
31	Rayssa Costa	Brazil
32	Leonora Mackinnon	Canada
33	Simona Pop	Romania
34	Tiffany Geroudet	Switzerland
35	Amanda Simeão	Brazil
36	Alejandra Terán	Mexico
37	Thi Nhu Hoa Nguyen	Vietnam
