= Tunisia at the 2016 Summer Olympics =

- IOC code: TUN
- NOC: Tunisian Olympic Committee
- Website: www.cnot.org.tn (in French)

in Rio de Janeiro
- Competitors: 61 in 17 sports
- Flag bearer: Oussama Mellouli
- Medals Ranked 75th: Gold 0 Silver 0 Bronze 3 Total 3

Summer Olympics appearances (overview)
- 1960; 1964; 1968; 1972; 1976; 1980; 1984; 1988; 1992; 1996; 2000; 2004; 2008; 2012; 2016; 2020; 2024; 2028

Tunisia competed at the 2016 Summer Olympics in Rio de Janeiro, Brazil, from 5 to 21 August 2016. Since the nation's official debut in 1960, Tunisian athletes have appeared in every edition of the Summer Olympic Games, except the 1980 Summer Olympics in Moscow because of the nation's partial support for the US-led boycott.

The Tunisian Olympic Committee (French: Comité National Olympique Tunisien, CNOT) fielded a team of 61 athletes, 40 men and 21 women, to compete in 17 sports at the Games. It was the nation's second-largest delegation sent to the Olympics, relatively smaller by 22 athletes than in London four years earlier. Men's handball was the only team-based sport in which Tunisia qualified for the Games. Among the sports represented by the nation's athletes, Tunisia made its Olympic debut in beach volleyball, as well as returning to table tennis after a twelve-year absence.

The Tunisian roster was highlighted by two accomplished Olympians from London 2012: long-distance swimmer Oussama Mellouli and steeplechaser Habiba Ghribi. At 32 years old and headed to his fifth Games, Mellouli emerged himself as Tunisia's most successful Olympian of all time, with three medals (two golds and one bronze), and the first swimmer to dominate at both the pool and open water in Olympic history. Because of his successes, Mellouli was selected to carry the nation's flag at the opening ceremony. Meanwhile, Ghribi, a three-time Olympian, established a historic milestone for her country in London, when she became the first Tunisian woman to earn an Olympic medal.

Apart from Mellouli and Ghribi, 18 Tunisian athletes previously competed in London, including fencing sisters Azza and Sarra Besbes, tennis players Malek Jaziri and Ons Jabeur, three-time Olympic judoka Nihal Chikhrouhou (women's +78 kg) and Houda Miled (women's 70 kg), race walker Hassanine Sebei, and freestyle wrestler Marwa Amri.

Tunisia returned home from Rio de Janeiro with three bronze medals; each of them was awarded to the Tunisian athletes in fencing, taekwondo, and wrestling, respectively, for the first time. Moreover, it matched the overall tally achieved in London four years earlier. Among the medalists were Amri (women's 58 kg), three-time Olympic fencer Inès Boubakri (women's foil), and taekwondo fighter Oussama Oueslati (men's 80 kg).

== Medalists ==
Medal	Name	Sport	Event	Date
Bronze	Inès Boubakri	Fencing	Women's foil	10 August
Bronze	Marwa Amri	Wrestling	Women's freestyle 58 kg	17 August
Bronze	Oussama Oueslati	Taekwondo	Men's 80 kg	19 August

== Athletics (track and field) ==
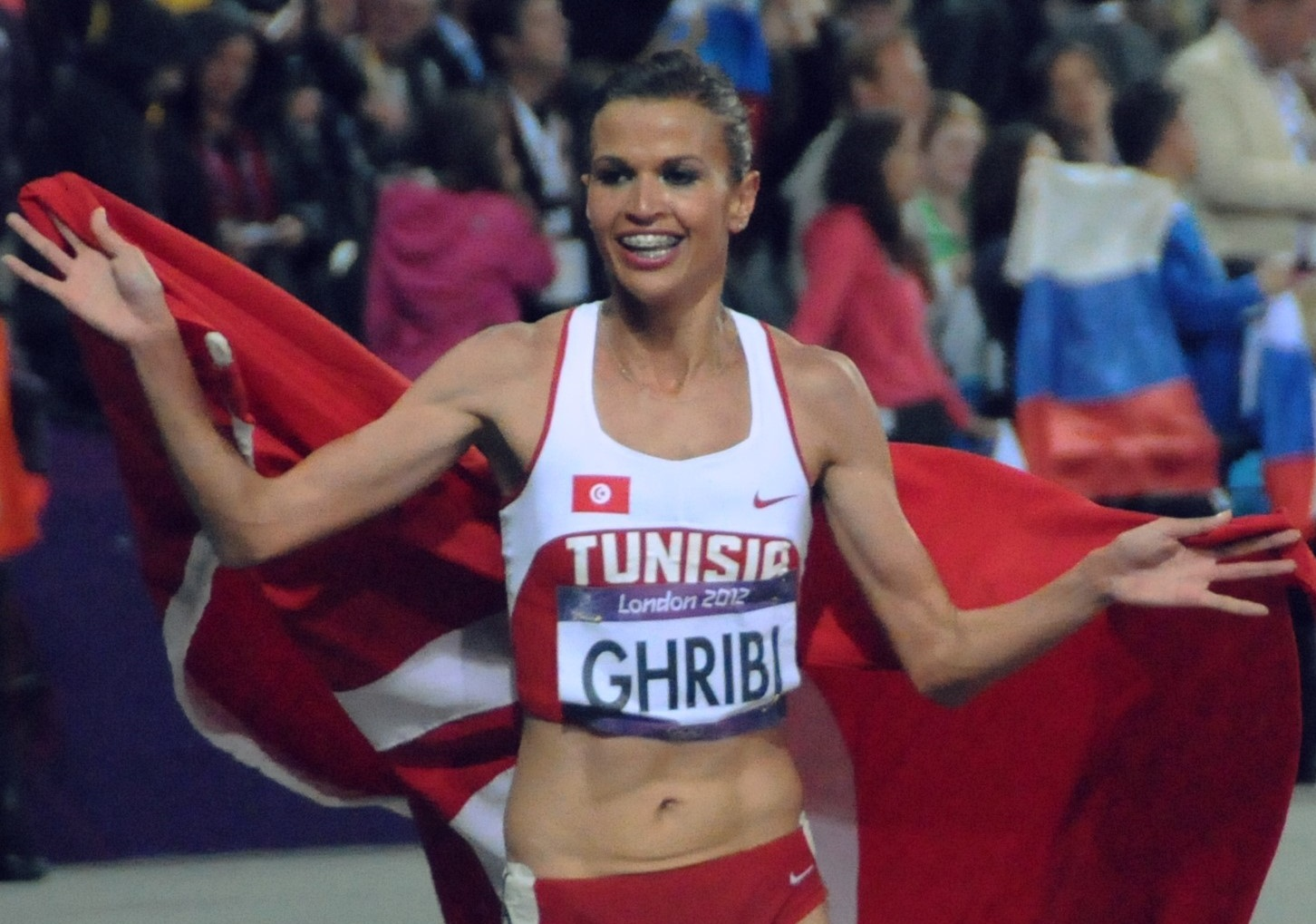
Habiba Ghribi after winning the silver medal in the 2012 Summer Olympics, which has since been upgraded to gold following the disqualification of the original gold medalist.

Tunisian athletes have so far achieved qualifying standards in the following athletics events (up to a maximum of 3 athletes in each event):

Seven athletes were named to Tunisia's track and field team for the Games, with Habiba Ghribi looking to defend her Olympic title in the women's 3000 m steeplechase.

Key

- Note–Ranks given for track events are within the athlete's heat only
- Q = Qualified for the next round
- q = Qualified for the next round as a fastest loser or, in field events, by position without achieving the qualifying target
- NR = National record
- N/A = Round not applicable for the event
- Bye = Athlete not required to compete in round

Track & road events
Men

Athlete	Event	Heat		Semifinal		Final	
Athlete	Event	Result	Rank	Result	Rank	Result	Rank
Amor Ben Yahia	3000 m steeplechase	8:23.12	4 q	—N/a		DSQ	
Wissem Hosni	Marathon	—N/a				DNF	
Atef Saad	Marathon	—N/a				2:19:50	62
Hassanine Sebei	20 km walk	—N/a				1:23:44	36
Mohamed Sghaier	400 m hurdles	50.09	5	Did not advance			

Women

Athlete	Event	Heat		Final	
Athlete	Event	Result	Rank	Result	Rank
Habiba Ghribi	3000 m steeplechase	9:18.71	4 Q	9:28.75	12
Chahinez Nasri	20 km walk	—N/a		1:42:57	60

== Boxing ==
Tunisia has entered two boxers to compete in each of the following weight classes into the Olympic boxing tournament. Bilel Mhamdi and Hassen Chaktami had claimed their Olympic spots at the 2016 African Qualification Tournament in Yaoundé, Cameroon.

Athlete	Event	Round of 32	Round of 16	Quarterfinals	Semifinals	Final	
Athlete	Event	Opposition Result	Opposition Result	Opposition Result	Opposition Result	Opposition Result	Rank
Bilel Mhamdi	Men's bantamweight	Suntele (LES); W 3–0	Melián (ARG); L 0–3	Did not advance			
Hassen Chaktami	Men's heavyweight	Bye	Russo (ITA); L 0–3	Did not advance			

== Canoeing ==
=== Sprint ===
Tunisia has qualified three boats for the following distances into the Olympic canoeing regatta through the 2016 African Sprint Qualifying Tournament.

Athlete	Event	Heats		Semifinals		Final	
Athlete	Event	Time	Rank	Time	Rank	Time	Rank
Mohamed Ali Mrabet	Men's K-1 1000 m	3:35.084	8 Q	3:43.145	8 FB	3:45.122	16
Khaled Houcine	Men's C-1 200 m	42.499	7	Did not advance			
Afef Ben Ismail	Women's K-1 500 m	2:08.170	7	Did not advance			

Qualification Legend: FA = Qualify to final (medal); FB = Qualify to final B (non-medal)

== Cycling ==
=== Road ===
Tunisia has qualified one rider in the men's Olympic road race by virtue of his top 10 individual ranking in the 2015 UCI Africa Tour.

Athlete	Event	Time	Rank
Ali Nouisri	Men's road race	Did not finish	

== Fencing ==
Tunisia has entered five fencers into the Olympic competition. Two-time Olympian Ines Boubakri had claimed a spot on the Tunisian team in the women's foil by finishing among the top 14 in the FIE Adjusted Official Rankings, while sisters Azza (women's sabre) and Sarra Besbes (women's épée) and debutant Mohamed Ayoub Ferjani (men's foil) did the same feat as the highest-ranked fencer coming from the Africa zone. Ferjani's brother Farès rounded out the Tunisian roster by virtue of a top finish in the men's sabre at the African Zonal Qualifier in Algiers, Algeria.

Athlete	Event	Round of 64	Round of 32	Round of 16	Quarterfinal	Semifinal	Final / BM	
Athlete	Event	Opposition Score	Opposition Score	Opposition Score	Opposition Score	Opposition Score	Opposition Score	Rank
Mohamed Ayoub Ferjani	Men's foil	Bye	Davis (GBR); L 7–15	Did not advance				
Farès Ferjani	Men's sabre	—N/a	Montano (ITA); L 11–15	Did not advance				
Sarra Besbes	Women's épée	Bye	Costa (BRA); W 15–8	Kirpu (EST); W 15–11	Sun Yw (CHN); L 11–14	Did not advance		
Inès Boubakri	Women's foil	Bye	Mohamed (EGY); W 15–4	Nishioka (JPN); W 15–10	Harvey (CAN); W 15–13	Di Francisca (ITA); L 9–12	Shanaeva (RUS); W 15–11	3rd place, bronze medalist(s)
Azza Besbes	Women's sabre	Bye	Mikina (AZE); W 15–12	Kozaczuk (POL); W 15–12	Brunet (FRA); L 14–15	Did not advance		

== Handball ==
Summary

Key:

- ET – After extra time
- P – Match decided by penalty-shootout.

Team	Event	Group Stage						Quarterfinal	Semifinal	Final / BM	
Team	Event	Opposition Score	Opposition Score	Opposition Score	Opposition Score	Opposition Score	Rank	Opposition Score	Opposition Score	Opposition Score	Rank
Tunisia men's	Men's tournament	France; L 23–25	Denmark; L 23–31	Qatar; D 25–25	Argentina; L 21–23	Croatia; L 26–41	6	Did not advance			12

=== Men's tournament ===
Tunisia men's handball team qualified for the Olympics by virtue of a top two finish at the first meet of the Olympic Qualification Tournament in Gdańsk.

Team roster

The following is the Tunisian roster in the men's handball tournament of the 2016 Summer Olympics.

Head coach: Hafedh Zouabi

No.	Pos.	Name	Date of birth (age)	Height	App.	Goals	Club
1	GK	Makram Missaoui	14 February 1981 (aged 35)	1.88 m	145	0	(Tunisia) Club Africain
4	LW	Aymen Toumi	11 July 1990 (aged 26)	1.84 m	71	123	(France) HBC Nantes
6	P	Issam Tej	29 July 1979 (aged 37)	1.87 m	304	797	(Qatar) El Jaish
8	LB	Mohamed Jilani Maaref	27 October 1991 (aged 24)	1.92 m	33	39	(Tunisia) Club Africain
9	RB	Amine Bannour	21 February 1990 (aged 26)	1.97 m	100	299	(Tunisia) Club Africain
12	GK	Marouen Maggaiz	28 July 1983 (aged 33)	1.91 m	173	3	(Tunisia) Espérance de Tunis
13	RW	Mohamed Ali Bhar	17 September 1989 (aged 26)	1.80 m			(Tunisia) Espérance de Tunis
15	LB	Khaled Haj Youssef	12 January 1989 (aged 27)	1.89 m	31	28	(Tunisia) Club Africain
21	LW	Oussama Boughanmi	5 February 1990 (aged 26)	1.86 m	100	424	Tremblay-en-France
22	CB	Sobhi Saïed	26 September 1982 (aged 33)	1.86 m	143	311	(Tunisia) Étoile Sportive du Sahel
23	LW	Oussama Hosni	17 September 1992 (aged 23)	1.92 m	46	51	(Tunisia) Club Africain
27	RB	Aymen Hammed	26 July 1983 (aged 33)	1.96 m	111	375	(Tunisia) Espérance de Tunis
31	P	Marouan Chouiref	27 May 1990 (aged 26)	1.97 m	91	100	Tremblay-en-France
39	CB	Mohamed Soussi	17 January 1993 (aged 23)	1.94 m	43	49	(Tunisia) Club Africain
42	LB	Wael Jallouz	3 May 1991 (aged 25)	1.98 m	102	257	(Spain) Barcelona

Group play

Pos	Team	Pld	W	D	L	GF	GA	GD	Pts	Qualification
1	Croatia	5	4	0	1	147	134	+13	8 (Note: Croatia 29–28 France)	Quarter-finals
2	France	5	4	0	1	152	126	+26	8	Quarter-finals
3	Denmark	5	3	0	2	136	127	+9	6	Quarter-finals
4	Qatar	5	2	1	2	122	127	−5	5	Quarter-finals
5	Argentina	5	1	0	4	110	126	−16	2	
6	Tunisia	5	0	1	4	118	145	−27	1	

Source: IHF
Rules for classification: 1) Points; 2) Head-to-head points; 3) Head-to-head goal difference; 4) Head-to-head goals scored; 5) Goal difference; 6) Goals scored; 7) Draw.
Notes:

7 August 2016; 19:50	France	25–23	Tunisia	Future Arena, Rio de Janeiro; Referees: Geipel, Helbig (GER)
7 August 2016; 19:50	Mahé 5	(16–11)	Tej 6	Future Arena, Rio de Janeiro; Referees: Geipel, Helbig (GER)
7 August 2016; 19:50	3× (yellow card) 1× (suspension)	Report	4× (yellow card) 6× (suspension)	Future Arena, Rio de Janeiro; Referees: Geipel, Helbig (GER)

9 August 2016; 14:40	Tunisia	23–31	Denmark	Future Arena, Rio de Janeiro; Referees: Pinto, Menezes (BRA)
9 August 2016; 14:40	Jallouz 5	(10–16)	Mortensen, Svan 8	Future Arena, Rio de Janeiro; Referees: Pinto, Menezes (BRA)
9 August 2016; 14:40	1× (yellow card) 2× (suspension) 1× (red card)	Report	3× (yellow card) 3× (suspension)	Future Arena, Rio de Janeiro; Referees: Pinto, Menezes (BRA)

11 August 2016; 09:30	Tunisia	25–25	Qatar	Future Arena, Rio de Janeiro; Referees: Gjeding, Hansen (DEN)
11 August 2016; 09:30	Boughanmi 8	(12–11)	Capote 12	Future Arena, Rio de Janeiro; Referees: Gjeding, Hansen (DEN)
11 August 2016; 09:30	2× (yellow card) 6× (suspension)	Report	2× (yellow card) 5× (suspension)	Future Arena, Rio de Janeiro; Referees: Gjeding, Hansen (DEN)

13 August 2016; 21:50	Argentina	23–21	Tunisia	Future Arena, Rio de Janeiro; Referees: Koo, Lee (KOR)
13 August 2016; 21:50	Pizarro 7	(14–10)	Boughanmi 8	Future Arena, Rio de Janeiro; Referees: Koo, Lee (KOR)
13 August 2016; 21:50	3× (yellow card) 5× (suspension)	Report	4× (yellow card) 4× (suspension) 1× (red card)	Future Arena, Rio de Janeiro; Referees: Koo, Lee (KOR)

15 August 2016; 19:50	Croatia	41–26	Tunisia	Future Arena, Rio de Janeiro; Referees: Coulibaly, Diabaté (CIV)
15 August 2016; 19:50	Karačić 9	(25–10)	Boughanmi 7	Future Arena, Rio de Janeiro; Referees: Coulibaly, Diabaté (CIV)
15 August 2016; 19:50	2× (yellow card) 4× (suspension)	Report	1× (yellow card) 1× (suspension)	Future Arena, Rio de Janeiro; Referees: Coulibaly, Diabaté (CIV)

== Judo ==
Tunisia has qualified a total of four judokas for the following weight classes at the Games. Hela Ayari, Faicel Jaballah, and two-time Olympian Nihal Chikhrouhou were ranked among the top 22 eligible judokas for men and top 14 for women in the IJF World Ranking List of May 30, 2016, while Houda Miled at women's middleweight (70 kg) earned a continental quota spot from the African region, as the highest-ranked Tunisian judoka outside of direct qualifying position.

Athlete	Event	Round of 32	Round of 16	Quarterfinals	Semifinals	Repechage	Final / BM	
Athlete	Event	Opposition Result	Opposition Result	Opposition Result	Opposition Result	Opposition Result	Opposition Result	Rank
Faicel Jaballah	Men's +100 kg	Bor (HUN); L 000–101	Did not advance					
Hela Ayari	Women's −52 kg	Bye	Miranda (BRA); L 000–100	Did not advance				
Houda Miled	Women's −70 kg	Conway (GBR); L 000–100	Did not advance					
Nihal Chikhrouhou	Women's +78 kg	Bye	Cerić (BIH); W 000–000 S	Andéol (FRA); L 000–000 S	Did not advance	Sayit (TUR); L 000–100	Did not advance	7

== Rowing ==
Tunisia has qualified one boat each in the men's single sculls and the women's lightweight double sculls for the Games at the 2015 African Continental Qualification Regatta in Tunis.

Athlete	Event	Heats		Repechage		Quarterfinals		Semifinals		Final	
Athlete	Event	Time	Rank	Time	Rank	Time	Rank	Time	Rank	Time	Rank
Mohamed Taieb	Men's single sculls	7:37.95	4 R	7:27.18	4 SE/F	Bye		8:02.05	2 FE	7:53.36	27
Nour El-Houda Ettaieb; Khadija Krimi	Women's lightweight double sculls	7:43.33	5 R	8:33.49	6 SC/D	—N/a		8:29.45	4 FD	7:56.26	20

Qualification Legend: FA=Final A (medal); FB=Final B (non-medal); FC=Final C (non-medal); FD=Final D (non-medal); FE=Final E (non-medal); FF=Final F (non-medal); SA/B=Semifinals A/B; SC/D=Semifinals C/D; SE/F=Semifinals E/F; QF=Quarterfinals; R=Repechage

== Sailing ==
Tunisian sailors have qualified one boat in each of the following classes through the 2014 ISAF Sailing World Championships, the individual fleet Worlds, and African qualifying regattas.

Athlete	Event	Race													Net points	Final rank
Athlete	Event	1	2	3	4	5	6	7	8	9	10	11	12	M*	Net points	Final rank
Youssef Akrout	Men's Laser	21	29	34	26	~~39~~	32	37	35	16	27	—N/a		EL	257	34
Ines Gmati	Women's Laser Radial	28	23	~~32~~	23	21	31	19	28	31	34	—N/a		EL	235	30
Hedi Gharbi; Rihab Hammami	Mixed Nacra 17	18	~~DNF~~	18	21	19	20	20	18	20	19	18	20	EL	211	20

M = Medal race; EL = Eliminated – did not advance into the medal race

== Shooting ==
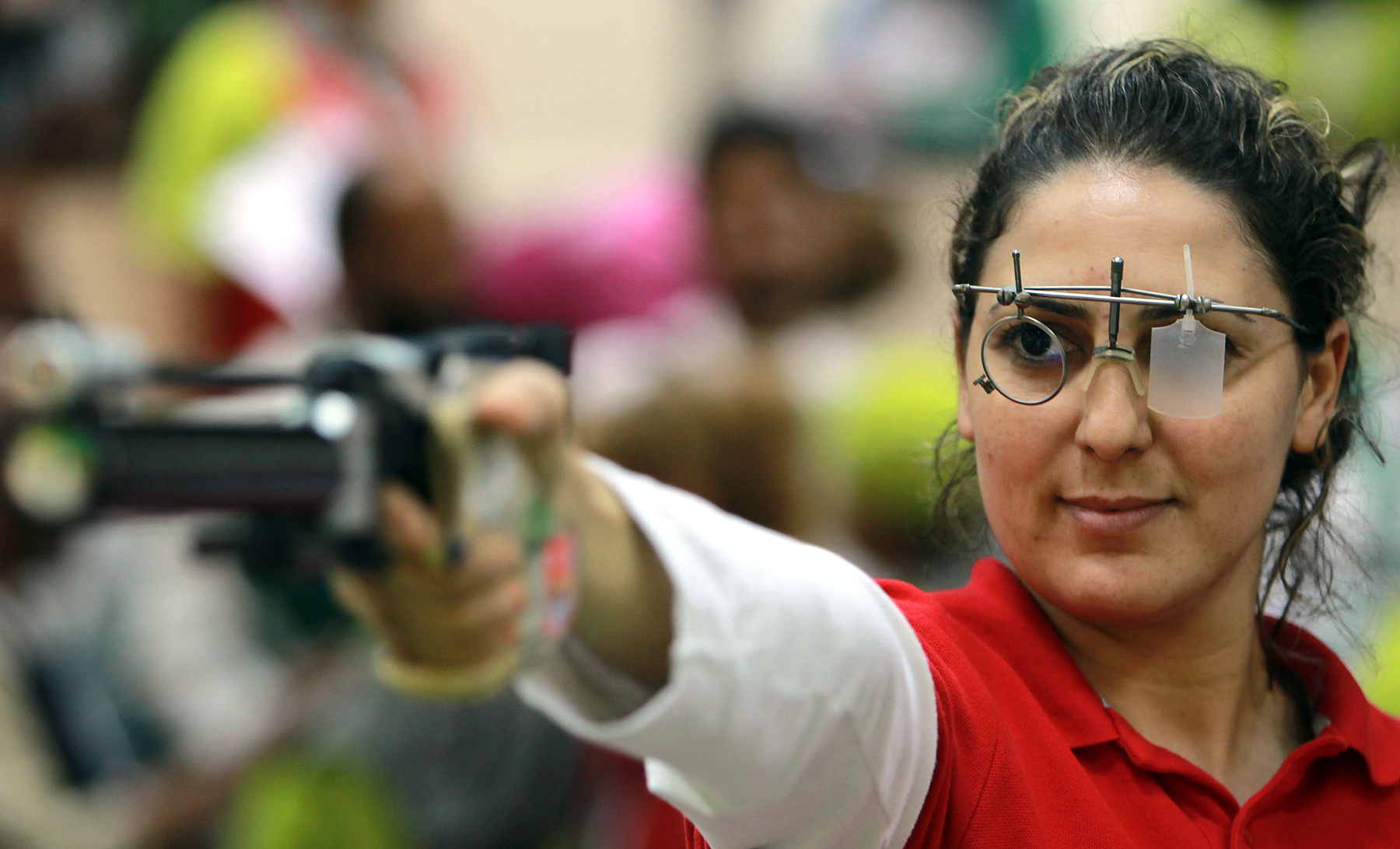
Olfa Charni competing in the final of the women's air pistol at the 2011 Pan Arab Games.

Tunisia has qualified one shooter in the women's pistol events by virtue of her best finish at the African Continental Championships and other selection competitions, as long as she obtained a minimum qualifying score (MQS) as of March 31, 2016.

Athlete	Event	Qualification		Semifinal		Final	
Athlete	Event	Points	Rank	Points	Rank	Points	Rank
Olfa Charni	Women's 10 m air pistol	384	9	—N/a		Did not advance	
Olfa Charni	Women's 25 m pistol	DNF		Did not advance			

Qualification Legend: Q = Qualify for the next round; q = Qualify for the bronze medal (shotgun)

== Swimming ==
Tunisian swimmers have so far achieved qualifying standards in the following events (up to a maximum of 2 swimmers in each event at the Olympic Qualifying Time (OQT), and potentially 1 at the Olympic Selection Time (OST)):

Athlete	Event	Heat		Semifinal		Final	
Athlete	Event	Time	Rank	Time	Rank	Time	Rank
Ahmed Mathlouthi	Men's 200 m freestyle	1:50.39	=41	Did not advance			
Ahmed Mathlouthi	Men's 400 m freestyle	3:52.00	35	—N/a		Did not advance	
Ahmed Mathlouthi	Men's 200 m individual medley	2:04.95	27	Did not advance			
Oussama Mellouli	Men's 1500 m freestyle	15:07.78	21	—N/a		Did not advance	
Oussama Mellouli	Men's 10 km open water	—N/a				1:53:06.1	12

== Table tennis ==
Tunisia has entered one athlete into the table tennis competition at the Games. Saifa Saidani had claimed the Olympic spot in the women's singles by virtue of her top two finish at the 2016 African Qualification Tournament in Khartoum, Sudan.

Athlete	Event	Preliminary	Round 1	Round 2	Round 3	Round of 16	Quarterfinals	Semifinals	Final / BM	
Athlete	Event	Opposition Result	Opposition Result	Opposition Result	Opposition Result	Opposition Result	Opposition Result	Opposition Result	Opposition Result	Rank
Safa Saidani	Women's singles	Meshref (EGY); L 0–4	Did not advance							

== Taekwondo ==
Tunisia entered three athletes into the taekwondo competition at the Olympics. Oussama Oueslati, Yassine Trabelsi, and Rahma Ben Ali secured the spots on the Tunisian team by virtue of their top two finish respectively in the men's welterweight (80 kg), men's heavyweight (+80 kg), and women's lightweight category (57 kg) at the 2016 African Qualification Tournament in Agadir, Morocco.

Athlete	Event	Round of 16	Quarterfinals	Semifinals	Repechage	Final / BM	
Athlete	Event	Opposition Result	Opposition Result	Opposition Result	Opposition Result	Opposition Result	Rank
Oussama Oueslati	Men's −80 kg	Rafalovich (UZB); W 11–8	Liu W-t (TPE); W 1–0	Cisse (CIV); L 6–7	Bye	Lopez (USA); W 14–5	3rd place, bronze medalist(s)
Yassine Trabelsi	Men's +80 kg	Castillo (CUB); L 4–13	Did not advance				
Rahma Ben Ali	Women's −57 kg	Hamada (JPN); L 0–9	Did not advance				

== Tennis ==
Tunisia has entered two tennis players into the Olympic tournament. London 2012 Olympian Malek Jaziri (world no. 63) qualified directly for the men's singles as one of the top 56 eligible players in the ATP World Rankings as of June 6, 2016, while Ons Jabeur (world no. 188) had claimed one of six ITF Olympic women's singles places, as Africa's top-ranked player outside of direct qualifying position in the WTA World Rankings.

Athlete	Event	Round of 64	Round of 32	Round of 16	Quarterfinals	Semifinals	Final / BM	
Athlete	Event	Opposition Score	Opposition Score	Opposition Score	Opposition Score	Opposition Score	Opposition Score	Rank
Malek Jaziri	Men's singles	Tsonga (FRA); L 6–4, 5–7, 3–6	Did not advance					
Ons Jabeur	Women's singles	Kasatkina (RUS); L 6–3, 6–7^{(4–7)}, 1–6	Did not advance					

== Volleyball ==
=== Beach ===
Tunisia has qualified the men's beach volleyball team for the Olympics by winning the CAVB Continental Cup final in Abuja, Nigeria, signifying the nation's Olympic debut in the sport.

Athlete	Event	Preliminary round	Standing	Round of 16	Quarterfinals	Semifinals	Final / BM	
Athlete	Event	Opposition Score	Standing	Opposition Score	Opposition Score	Opposition Score	Opposition Score	Rank
Mohamed Arafet Naceur; Choaib Belhaj Salah	Men's	Pool C Dalhausser – Lucena (USA); L 0 – 2 (7–21, 13–21); Lupo – Nicolai (ITA); L 0 – 2 (17–21, 13–21); Ontiveros – Virgen (MEX); L 0 – 2 (10–21, 10–21)	4	Did not advance				

== Weightlifting ==
Tunisia has qualified one male and one female weightlifter for the Rio Olympics by virtue of a top five national finish (for men) and top four (for women), respectively, at the 2016 African Championships. The team must allocate these places to individual athletes by June 20, 2016.

Athlete	Event	Snatch		Clean & Jerk		Total	Rank
Athlete	Event	Result	Rank	Result	Rank	Total	Rank
Karem Ben Hnia	Men's −69 kg	147	6	~~177~~	DNF	147	DNF
Yosra Dhieb	Women's +75 kg	111	13	138	11	249	11

== Wrestling ==
Tunisia has qualified four wrestlers for each of the following weight classes into the Olympic competition, as a result of their semifinal triumphs at the 2016 African & Oceania Qualification Tournament.

Key:

- VT – Victory by Fall.
- PP – Decision by Points – the loser with technical points.
- PO – Decision by Points – the loser without technical points.
- ST – Technical superiority – the loser without technical points and a margin of victory of at least 8 (Greco-Roman) or 10 (freestyle) points.

Men's freestyle

Athlete	Event	Qualification	Round of 16	Quarterfinal	Semifinal	Repechage 1	Repechage 2	Final / BM	
Athlete	Event	Opposition Result	Opposition Result	Opposition Result	Opposition Result	Opposition Result	Opposition Result	Opposition Result	Rank
Mohamed Saadaoui	−86 kg	Karimi (IRI); L 0–3 ^{PO}	Did not advance						18
Radhouane Chebbi	−125 kg	Kamal (EGY); L 0–4 ^{ST}	Did not advance						19

Women's freestyle

Athlete	Event	Qualification	Round of 16	Quarterfinal	Semifinal	Repechage 1	Repechage 2	Final / BM	
Athlete	Event	Opposition Result	Opposition Result	Opposition Result	Opposition Result	Opposition Result	Opposition Result	Opposition Result	Rank
Marwa Amri	−58 kg	Bye	Icho (JPN); L 1–3 ^{ST}	Did not advance		Bye	Yeşilırmak (TUR); W 3–1 ^{PP}	Ratkevich (AZE); W 3–1 ^{PP}	3rd place, bronze medalist(s)
Hela Riabi	−63 kg	Bye	Grigorjeva (LAT); L 0–4 ^{ST}	Did not advance					18
