= Gbahi Gwladys Sakoa =

Ivorian fencer (born 1992)

Personal information
- Born: 3 December 1992 (age 33)
- Height: 5 ft 7 in (170 cm)
- Weight: 141 lb (64 kg; 10.1 st)

Sport
- Sport: Fencing

Gbahi Gwladys Sakoa (born 3 December 1992) is an Ivorian fencer. She competed in the women's épée event at the 2016 Summer Olympics.
