= Azerbaijan at the 2016 Summer Olympics =

- IOC code: AZE
- NOC: National Olympic Committee of the Republic of Azerbaijan
- Website: www.olympic.az (in Azerbaijani and English)

in Rio de Janeiro
- Competitors: 56 in 14 sports
- Flag bearers: Teymur Mammadov (opening); Haji Aliyev (closing)
- Medals Ranked 39th: Gold 1 Silver 7 Bronze 10 Total 18

Summer Olympics appearances (overview)
- 1996; 2000; 2004; 2008; 2012; 2016; 2020; 2024

Other related appearances
- Russian Empire (1900–1912); Soviet Union (1952–1988); Unified Team (1992)

Azerbaijan competed at the 2016 Summer Olympics in Rio de Janeiro, Brazil, from 5 to 21 August 2016. This was the nation's sixth consecutive appearance at the Summer Olympics in the post-Soviet era.

The National Olympic Committee of the Republic of Azerbaijan fielded a team of 56 athletes, 42 men and 14 women, across 14 sports at the Games. Azerbaijan made its Olympic debut in four sports (archery, slalom canoeing, track cycling, and triathlon). It was the nation's largest ever delegation sent to the Olympics in its independent history, beating the record of 53 athletes who represented Azerbaijan at the 2012 London Olympics four years earlier. More than 60 percent of the nation's roster were born outside Azerbaijan; several of them hailed from Eastern Europe, particularly from Russia and Ukraine. For the first time in history, Azerbaijan was not represented in weightlifting, as the International Weightlifting Federation decided to strip of its quota places over "multiple positive cases" of doping.

The Azerbaijani roster featured 36 rookies and 20 returning Olympians. Of the returnees, nine of them had won Olympic medals in London, including defending wrestling champions Toghrul Asgarov and Sharif Sharifov, freestyle wrestlers Mariya Stadnik and Yuliya Ratkevich, four-time kayak sprint medalist Inna Osypenko-Radomska, who had represented her native Ukraine at four previous editions (2000 to 2012) before transferring her allegiance to Azerbaijan in 2014, and boxers Magomedrasul Majidov (super heavyweight) and European Games champion Teymur Mammadov (light heavyweight), who was selected as Azerbaijan's flag bearer in the opening ceremony.

Azerbaijan left Rio de Janeiro with a total of 18 medals (1 gold, 7 silver, and 10 bronze), signifying the nation's most successful Olympic outcome in its independent history. Nine of these medals were medals won in wrestling, three in taekwondo for the first time, and two each in boxing, sprint canoeing, and judo. Among the nation's medalists were Stadnik, who managed to repeat her silver from London; Osypenko-Radomska, who extended her career haul with a bronze medal and fifth overall, and taekwondo athlete Radik Isayev (men's +80 kg), who secured Azerbaijan's only gold-medal triumph at the Games.

== Medalists ==
Medal	Name	Sport	Event	Date
Gold	Radik Isayev	Taekwondo	Men's +80 kg	20 August
Silver	Rustam Orujov	Judo	Men's 73 kg	8 August
Silver	Elmar Gasimov	Judo	Men's 100 kg	11 August
Silver	Mariya Stadnik	Wrestling	Women's freestyle 48 kg	17 August
Silver	Valentin Demyanenko	Canoeing	Men's C-1 200 m	18 August
Silver	Toghrul Asgarov	Wrestling	Men's freestyle 65 kg	21 August
Silver	Lorenzo Sotomayor	Boxing	Men's light welterweight	21 August
Silver	Khetag Gazyumov	Wrestling	Men's freestyle 97 kg	21 August
Bronze	Sabah Shariati	Wrestling	Men's Greco-Roman 130 kg	15 August
Bronze	Inna Osypenko-Radomska	Canoeing	Women's K-1 200 m	16 August
Bronze	Rasul Chunayev	Wrestling	Men's Greco-Roman 66 kg	16 August
Bronze	Patimat Abakarova	Taekwondo	Women's 49 kg	17 August
Bronze	Kamran Shakhsuvarly	Boxing	Men's middleweight	18 August
Bronze	Nataliya Synyshyn	Wrestling	Women's freestyle 53 kg	18 August
Bronze	Haji Aliyev	Wrestling	Men's freestyle 57 kg	19 August
Bronze	Jabrayil Hasanov	Wrestling	Men's freestyle 74 kg	19 August
Bronze	Milad Beigi	Taekwondo	Men's 80 kg	19 August
Bronze	Sharif Sharifov	Wrestling	Men's freestyle 86 kg	20 August

Medals by sport
Sport	1st place, gold medalist(s)	2nd place, silver medalist(s)	3rd place, bronze medalist(s)	Total
Taekwondo	1	0	2	3
Wrestling	0	3	6	9
Judo	0	2	0	2
Boxing	0	1	1	2
Canoeing	0	1	1	2
Total	1	7	10	18

== Competitors ==
The following is the list of number of competitors participating in the Games:

Sport	Men	Women	Total
Archery	0	1	1
Athletics	3	1	4
Boxing	10	1	11
Canoeing	2	1	3
Cycling	1	2	3
Fencing	0	1	1
Gymnastics	2	1	3
Judo	6	0	6
Rowing	2	0	2
Shooting	1	0	1
Swimming	1	1	2
Taekwondo	2	2	4
Triathlon	1	0	1
Wrestling	11	3	14
Total	42	14	56

== Archery ==
One Azerbaijani archer has qualified for the women's individual recurve at the Olympics by securing one of three available Olympic spots at the 2016 European Championships in Nottingham, Great Britain, signifying the nation's Olympic debut in the sport.

Athlete	Event	Ranking round		Round of 64	Round of 32	Round of 16	Quarterfinals	Semi-finals	Final / BM	
Athlete	Event	Score	Seed	Opposition Score	Opposition Score	Opposition Score	Opposition Score	Opposition Score	Opposition Score	Rank
Olga Senyuk	Women's individual	623	37	Cao H (CHN); L 1–7	Did not advance					

== Athletics ==
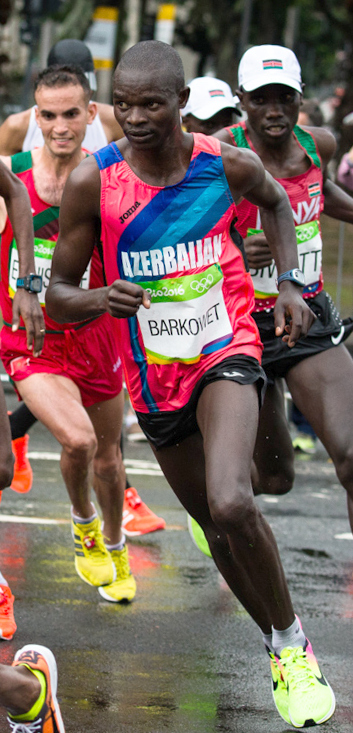
Kenyan-born Evans Kiplagat finished twenty-eighth in men's marathon.

Azerbaijani athletes have so far achieved qualifying standards in the following athletics events (up to a maximum of 3 athletes in each event):

Key

- Note–Ranks given for track events are within the athlete's heat only
- Q = Qualified for the next round
- q = Qualified for the next round as a fastest loser or, in field events, by position without achieving the qualifying target
- NR = National record
- N/A = Round not applicable for the event
- Bye = Athlete not required to compete in round

Track & road events

Athlete	Event	Heat		Final	
Athlete	Event	Result	Rank	Result	Rank
Hayle Ibrahimov	Men's 5000 m	13:27.11	19	Did not advance	
Evans Kiplagat	Men's marathon	—N/a		2:15:31	28

Field events

Athlete	Event	Qualification		Final	
Athlete	Event	Distance	Position	Distance	Position
Nazim Babayev	Men's triple jump	16.38	25	Did not advance	
Hanna Skydan	Women's hammer throw	70.09	13	Did not advance	

== Boxing ==
Azerbaijan has entered eleven boxers to compete in the following weight classes into the Olympic boxing tournament. Parviz Baghirov was the only Azerbaijani boxer to be selected to the Olympic team with a top two finish of his respective division in the World Series of Boxing, while 2012 Olympian Elvin Mamishzada and Russian import Albert Selimov had secured their places at the 2015 World Championships.

Five further boxers (Chalabiyev, Sotomayor, Abdullayev, Majidov, and Alekseevna) had claimed their Olympic spots at the 2016 European Qualification Tournament in Samsun, Turkey. Meanwhile, Kamran Shakhsuvarly, Youth Olympic light flyweight champion Rufat Huseynov, London 2012 bronze medalist Teymur Mammadov secured additional places on the Azerbaijani roster to complete the Olympic boxing lineup at the 2016 AIBA World Qualifying Tournament in Baku.

Men

Athlete	Event	Round of 32	Round of 16	Quarterfinals	Semi-finals	Final	
Athlete	Event	Opposition Result	Opposition Result	Opposition Result	Opposition Result	Opposition Result	Rank
Rufat Huseynov	Light flyweight	Hamunyela (NAM); L 0–3	Did not advance				
Elvin Mamishzada	Flyweight	Bye	Sattibayev (KAZ); W 3–0	Zoirov (UZB); L 0–3	Did not advance		
Javid Chalabiyev	Bantamweight	Yeraliyev (KAZ); L 1–2	Did not advance				
Albert Selimov	Lightweight	Bye	Joyce (IRL); W 3–0	Oumiha (FRA); L 0–3	Did not advance		
Lorenzo Sotomayor	Light welterweight	Matviychuk (UKR); W 3–0	Amzile (FRA); W 2–1	Toledo (CUB); W 3–0	Harutyunyan (GER); W 3–0	Gaibnazarov (UZB); L 1–2	2nd place, silver medalist(s)
Parviz Baghirov	Welterweight	Bye	Cissokho (FRA); L 0–3	Did not advance			
Kamran Shakhsuvarly	Middleweight	Zhao Mg (CHN); W 3–0	Chebotarev (RUS); W 2–1	Alimkhanuly (KAZ); W 2–1	López (CUB); L 0–3	Did not advance	3rd place, bronze medalist(s)
Teymur Mammadov	Light heavyweight	Solonenko (UKR); W 3–0	Müllenberg (NED); W 3–0	Niyazymbetov (KAZ); L 0–3	Did not advance		
Abdulkadir Abdullayev	Heavyweight	Bye	Omba-Biongolo (FRA); W TKO	Tulaganov (UZB); L 0–3	Did not advance		
Magomedrasul Majidov	Super heavyweight	Arjaoui (MAR); W 3–0	Dychko (KAZ); L 0–3	Did not advance			

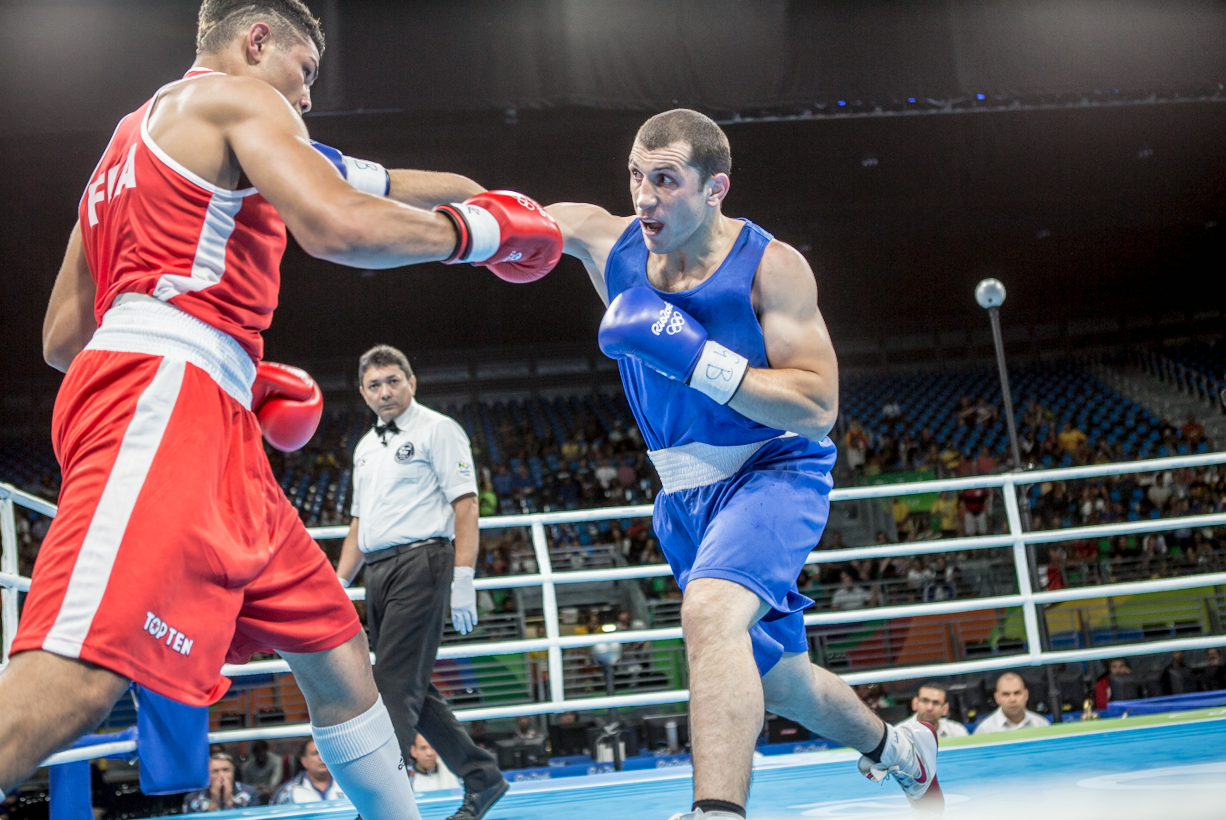
Abdulkadir Abdullayev (blue) boxed against France's Paul Omba-Biongolo in men's heavyweight division.

Women

Athlete	Event	Round of 16	Quarterfinals	Semi-finals	Final	
Athlete	Event	Opposition Result	Opposition Result	Opposition Result	Opposition Result	Rank
Yana Alekseevna	Lightweight	Bye	Yin Jh (CHN); L 0–3	Did not advance		

== Canoeing ==
=== Slalom ===
Azerbaijani canoeists have qualified a maximum of one boat in each of the following classes through the 2015 ICF Canoe Slalom World Championships.

Athlete	Event	Preliminary						Semi-final		Final	
Athlete	Event	Run 1	Rank	Run 2	Rank	Best	Rank	Time	Rank	Time	Rank
Jure Meglič	Men's K-1	95.12	13	90.70	8	90.70	11 Q	145.00	14	Did not advance	

=== Sprint ===
Azerbaijani canoeists has qualified one boat in each of the following events through the 2015 ICF Canoe Sprint World Championships.

Athlete	Event	Heats		Semi-finals		Final	
Athlete	Event	Time	Rank	Time	Rank	Time	Rank
Valentin Demyanenko	Men's C-1 200 m	39.749	1 Q	40.298	2 FA	39.493	2nd place, silver medalist(s)
Inna Osypenko-Radomska	Women's K-1 200 m	40.702	1 Q	39.803	1 FA	40.401	3rd place, bronze medalist(s)
Inna Osypenko-Radomska	Women's K-1 500 m	1:51.750	1 Q	1:57.627	2 FA	1:56.573	8

Qualification Legend: FA = Qualify to final (medal); FB = Qualify to final B (non-medal)

== Cycling ==
=== Road ===
Azerbaijan has qualified one rider in the men's Olympic road race by virtue of his top 200 individual ranking in the 2015 UCI Europe Tour. One additional spot was awarded to the Azerbaijani cyclist in the women's road race by virtue of her top 100 individual placement in the 2016 UCI World Rankings.

Athlete	Event	Time	Rank
Maksym Averin	Men's road race	Did not finish	
Olena Pavlukhina	Women's road race	3:59:05	35

=== Track ===
Following the completion of the 2016 UCI Track Cycling World Championships, Azerbaijan has entered one rider to compete only in both women's sprint and keirin at the Olympics, by virtue of her final individual UCI Olympic rankings in those events.

Sprint

Athlete	Event	Qualification		Round 1	Repechage 1	Round 2	Repechage 2	Quarterfinals	Semi-finals	Final	
Athlete	Event	Time Speed (km/h)	Rank	Opposition Time Speed (km/h)	Opposition Time Speed (km/h)	Opposition Time Speed (km/h)	Opposition Time Speed (km/h)	Opposition Time Speed (km/h)	Opposition Time Speed (km/h)	Opposition Time Speed (km/h)	Rank
Olga Ismayilova	Women's sprint	11.152; 64.562	18 Q	James (GBR); L	Meares (AUS) van Riessen (NED); L	Did not advance					

Keirin

Athlete	Event	1st Round	Repechage	2nd Round	Final
Athlete	Event	Rank	Rank	Rank	Rank
Olga Ismayilova	Women's keirin	4 R	4	Did not advance	

== Fencing ==
Azerbaijan has entered one fencer into the Olympic competition. 2012 Olympian Sabina Mikina had claimed the sole Olympic spot as the winner of the women's sabre at the European Zonal Qualifier in Prague, Czech Republic.

Athlete	Event	Round of 64	Round of 32	Round of 16	Quarterfinal	Semi-final	Final / BM	
Athlete	Event	Opposition Score	Opposition Score	Opposition Score	Opposition Score	Opposition Score	Opposition Score	Rank
Sabina Mikina	Women's sabre	Bye	A Besbes (TUN); L 12–15	Did not advance				

== Gymnastics ==
=== Artistic ===
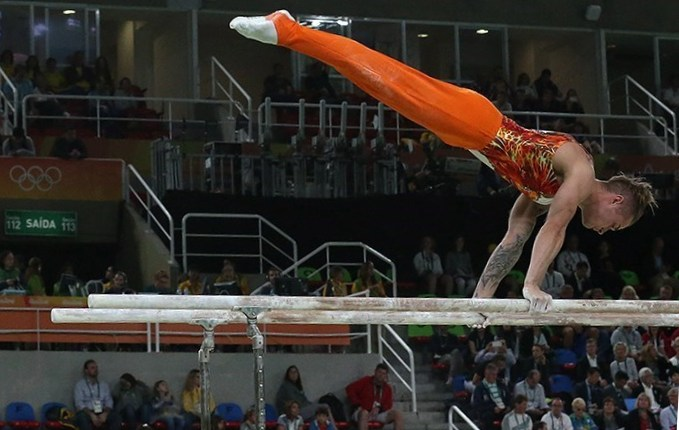
Oleg Stepko in the all-around final.

Azerbaijan has entered one artistic gymnast into the Olympic competition. 2012 Olympian Oleg Stepko had claimed an Olympic spot in the men's apparatus and all-around events at the 2015 World Championships in Glasgow, while Petro Pakhnyuk did so at the Olympic Test Event in Rio de Janeiro.

Men

Athlete	Event	Qualification								Final							
Athlete	Event	Apparatus						Total	Rank	Apparatus						Total	Rank
Athlete	Event	F	PH	R	V	PB	HB	Total	Rank	F	PH	R	V	PB	HB	Total	Rank
Petro Pakhnyuk	All-around	14.133	14.233	13.600	14.300	14.166	13.783	84.215	34	Did not advance							
Oleg Stepko	All-around	13.900	14.975	14.033	14.400	15.300	13.600	86.208	20 Q	12.266	13.100	14.533	14.916	13.800	10.466	79.081	22

=== Rhythmic ===
Azerbaijan has qualified one rhythmic gymnast for the individual all-around by finishing in the top 15 at the 2015 World Championships in Stuttgart, Germany.

Athlete	Event	Qualification						Final					
Athlete	Event	Hoop	Ball	Clubs	Ribbon	Total	Rank	Hoop	Ball	Clubs	Ribbon	Total	Rank
Marina Durunda	Individual	17.466	17.466	17.683	17.733	70.348	8 Q	16.950	17.541	17.716	17.541	69.748	9

== Judo ==
Azerbaijan has qualified a total of six judokas for each of the following weight classes at the Games by virtue of their top 22 national finish for men in the IJF World Ranking List of 30 May 2016.

Athlete	Event	Round of 64	Round of 32	Round of 16	Quarterfinals	Semi-finals	Repechage	Final / BM	
Athlete	Event	Opposition Result	Opposition Result	Opposition Result	Opposition Result	Opposition Result	Opposition Result	Opposition Result	Rank
Orkhan Safarov	Men's −60 kg	Bye	Postigos (PER); W 001–000	Bestaev (KGZ); W 110–000	Kitadai (BRA); W 100–000	Smetov (KAZ); L 000–010	Bye	Takato (JPN); L 000–000 S	5
Nijat Shikhalizade	Men's −66 kg	Bye	Uriarte (ESP); W 000–000 S	Basile (ITA); L 000–110	Did not advance				
Rustam Orujov	Men's −73 kg	Bye	Khamza (KAZ); W 000–000 S	Bensted (AUS); W 100–000	Ungvári (HUN); W 010–000	Muki (ISR); W 001–000	Bye	Ono (JPN); L 000–110	2nd place, silver medalist(s)
Mammadali Mehdiyev	Men's −90 kg	Bye	Denisov (RUS); W 100–000	Camilo (BRA); W 011–001	Gwak D-h (KOR); L 000–100	Did not advance	Lkhagvasüren (MGL); L 000–001	Did not advance	7
Elmar Gasimov	Men's −100 kg	Bye	Khaibulaev (RUS); W 011–000	Bouyacoub (ALG); W 010–010 S	Darwish (EGY); W 100–000	Bloshenko (UKR); W 100–000	Bye	Krpálek (CZE); L 000–100	2nd place, silver medalist(s)
Ushangi Kokauri	Men's +100 kg	—N/a	Ņikiforenko (LAT); W 111–000	Harasawa (JPN); L 000–100	Did not advance				

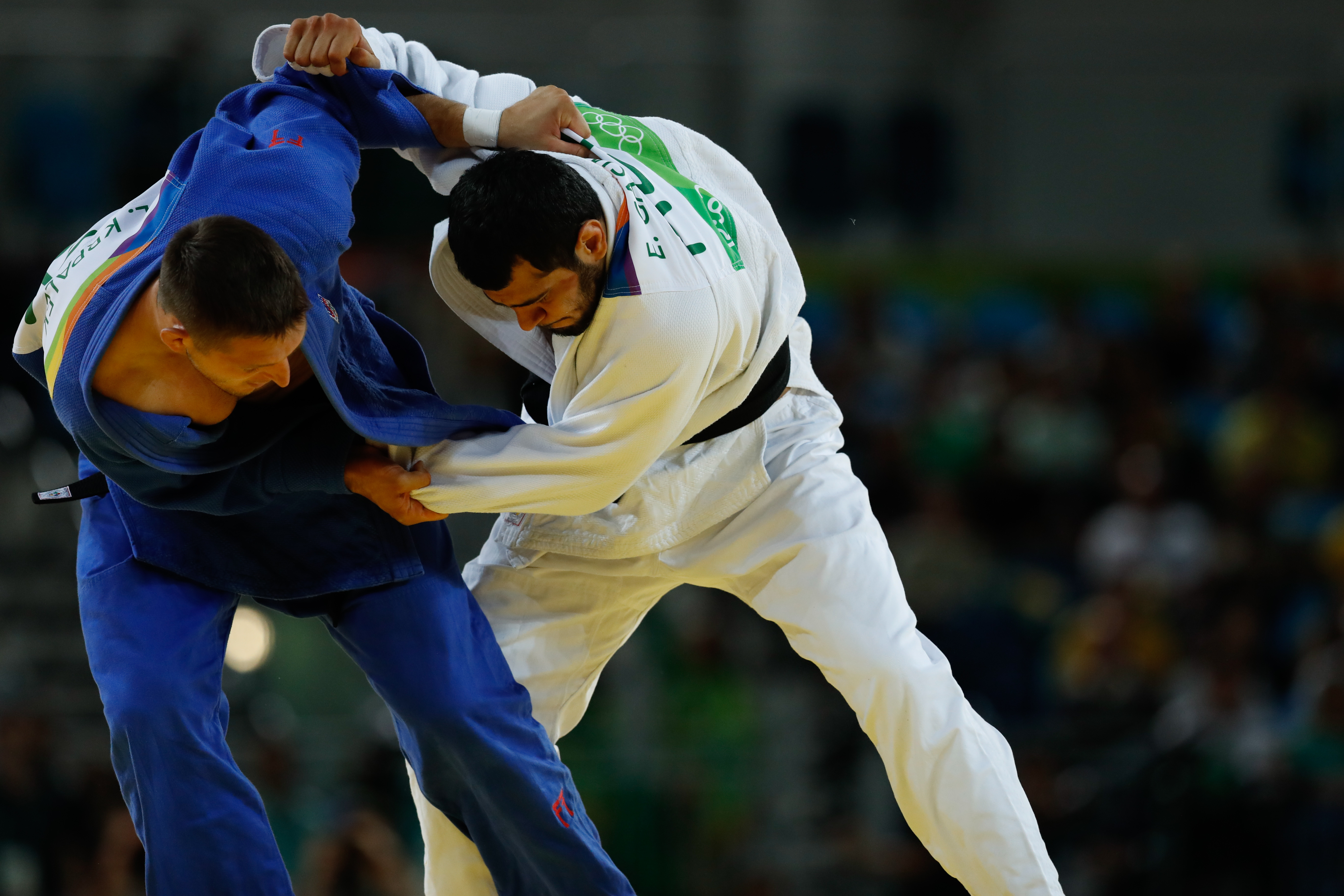
Elmar Gasimov fought against Czech Republic's Lukáš Krpálek in the men's 100 kg final.

== Rowing ==
Azerbaijan has qualified one boat in the men's double sculls for the Olympics at the 2015 FISA World Championships.

Athlete	Event	Heats		Repechage		Semi-finals		Final	
Athlete	Event	Time	Rank	Time	Rank	Time	Rank	Time	Rank
Aleksandar Aleksandrov; Boris Yotov	Men's double sculls	6:40.52	2 SA/B	Bye		6:37.49	6 FB	7:24.03	12

Qualification Legend: FA=Final A (medal); FB=Final B (non-medal); FC=Final C (non-medal); FD=Final D (non-medal); FE=Final E (non-medal); FF=Final F (non-medal); SA/B=Semifinals A/B; SC/D=Semifinals C/D; SE/F=Semifinals E/F; QF=Quarterfinals; R=Repechage

== Shooting ==
Azerbaijan has received an invitation from ISSF to send Ruslan Lunev in both the men's air and rapid fire pistol to the Olympics, as long as the minimum qualifying score (MQS) was met by 31 March 2016.

Athlete	Event	Qualification		Final	
Athlete	Event	Points	Rank	Points	Rank
Ruslan Lunev	Men's 10 m air pistol	577	15	Did not advance	
Ruslan Lunev	Men's 25 m rapid fire pistol	575	15	Did not advance	

Qualification Legend: Q = Qualify for the next round; q = Qualify for the bronze medal (shotgun)

== Swimming ==
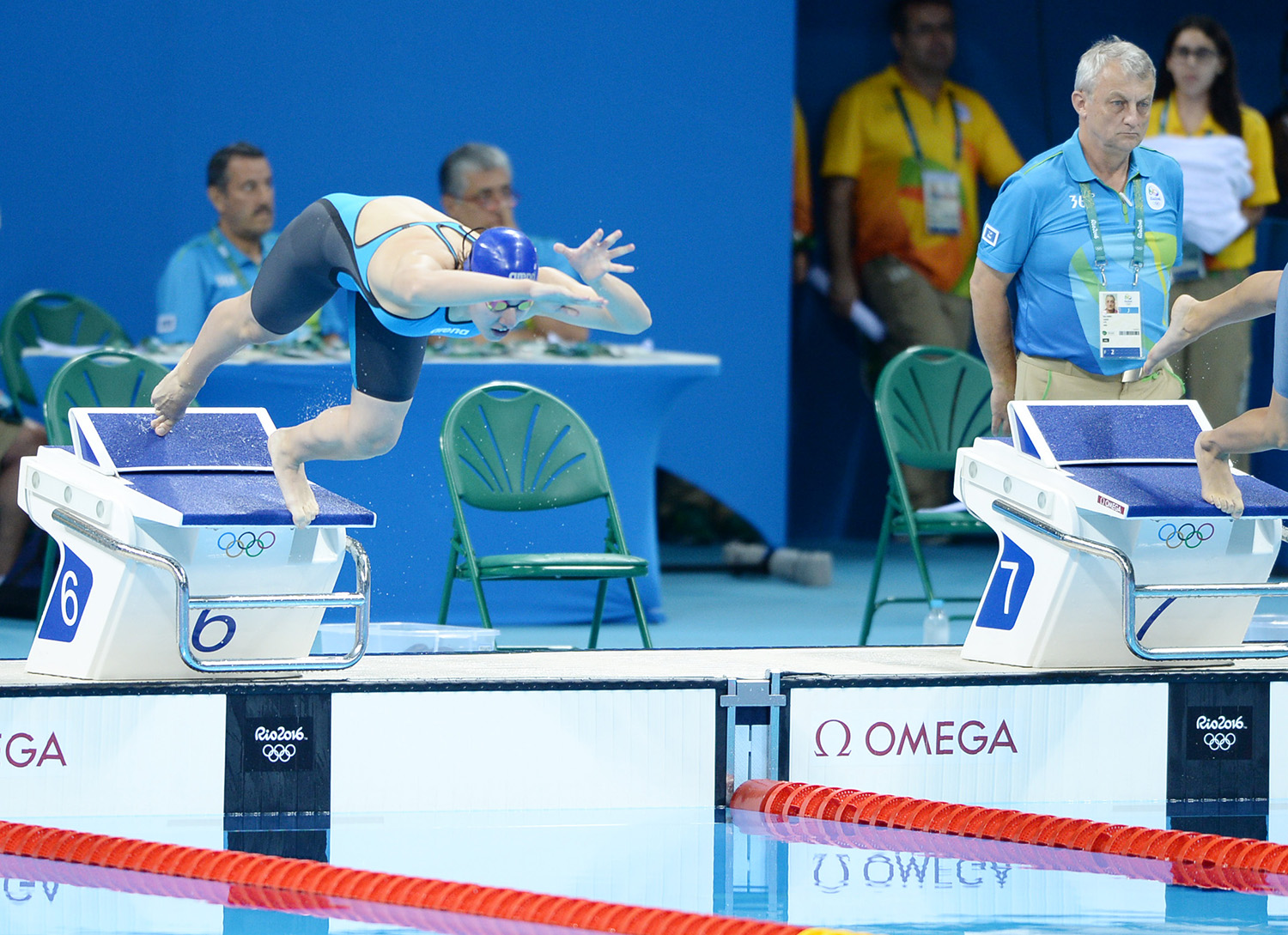
Fatima Alkaramova swam in the women's 100-metre freestyle.

Azerbaijan has received a Universality invitation from FINA to send two swimmers (one male and one female) to the Olympics.

Athlete	Event	Heat		Semi-final		Final	
Athlete	Event	Time	Rank	Time	Rank	Time	Rank
Boris Kirillov	Men's 200 m backstroke	2:05.01	26	Did not advance			
Fatima Alkaramova	Women's 100 m freestyle	59.41	41	Did not advance			

== Taekwondo ==
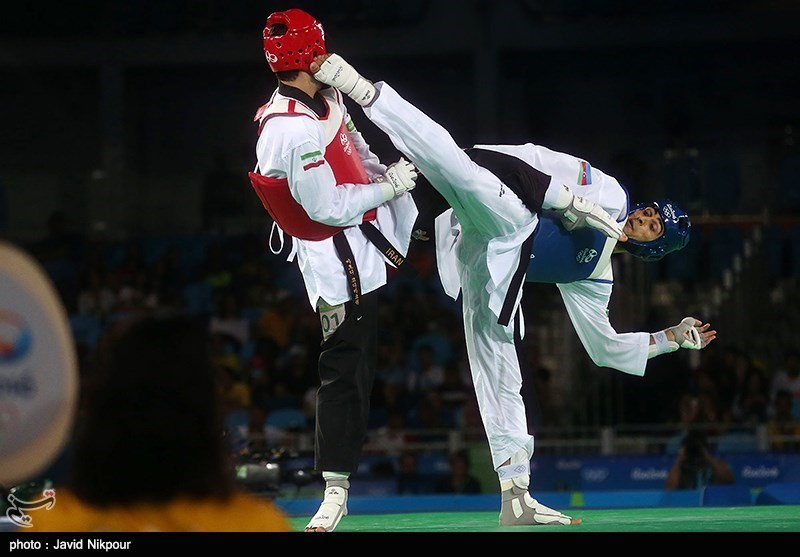
Milad Beigi (blue) and Mehdi Khodabakhshi

Azerbaijan entered a full squad of four athletes into the taekwondo competition at the Olympics. Radik Isayev qualified automatically for the men's heavyweight category (+80 kg) by finishing in the top 6 WTF Olympic rankings. European Games medalists Milad Beigi, Patimat Abakarova, and 2012 Olympian Farida Azizova secured the remaining spots on the Azerbaijani team by virtue of their top two finish respectively in the men's welterweight (80 kg), women's flyweight (49 kg) and women's welterweight category (67 kg) at the 2016 European Qualification Tournament in Istanbul, Turkey.

Athlete	Event	Round of 16	Quarterfinals	Semi-finals	Repechage	Final / BM	
Athlete	Event	Opposition Result	Opposition Result	Opposition Result	Opposition Result	Opposition Result	Rank
Milad Beigi	Men's −80 kg	Coulibaly (MLI); W 13–6	Khodabakhshi (IRI); W 17–5 PTG	Muhammad (GBR); L 7–12	Bye	Paziński (POL); W 12–0 PTG	3rd place, bronze medalist(s)
Radik Isayev	Men's +80 kg	Zhaparov (KAZ); W 11–2	Cha D-m (KOR); W 12–8	Cho (GBR); W 4–1	Bye	Issoufou (NIG); W 6–2	1st place, gold medalist(s)
Patimat Abakarova	Women's −49 kg	Bogdanović (SRB); L 2–3	Did not advance		Wu Jy (CHN); W 4–3	Aziez (FRA); W 7–2	3rd place, bronze medalist(s)
Farida Azizova	Women's −67 kg	McPherson (USA); W 6–5	Tursunkulova (UZB); W 5–1	Oh H-r (KOR); L 5–6	Bye	Gbagbi (CIV); L 1–7	5

== Triathlon ==
Azerbaijan has entered one triathlete to compete at the Games, signifying the nation's Olympic debut in the sport. Russian-born Rostyslav Pevtsov was ranked among the top 40 eligible triathletes in the men's event based on the ITU Olympic Qualification List as of 15 May 2016.

Athlete	Event	Swim (1.5 km)	Trans 1	Bike (40 km)	Trans 2	Run (10 km)	Total Time	Rank
Rostyslav Pevtsov	Men's	18:14	0:51	58:12	0:42	32:07	1:52:06	39

== Wrestling ==
Azerbaijan has qualified a total of fourteen wrestlers for each of the following weight classes into the Olympic competition. Majority of Olympic berths were awarded to Azerbaijani wrestlers by virtue of their top six finish at the 2015 World Championships, while one of them had claimed an Olympic spot in men's freestyle 74 kg with a semi-final triumph at the 2016 European Qualification Tournament.

Two further wrestlers had claimed the remaining Olympic slots to round out the Azerbaijani roster in separate World Qualification Tournaments; one of them in men's freestyle 57 kg at the initial meet in Ulaanbaatar, while the other in men's Greco-Roman 66 kg at the final meet in Istanbul.

Key:

- VT – Victory by Fall.
- PP – Decision by Points – the loser with technical points.
- PO – Decision by Points – the loser without technical points.
- ST – Technical superiority – the loser without technical points and a margin of victory of at least 8 (Greco-Roman) or 10 (freestyle) points.
- SP – Technical superiority – the loser with technical points and a margin of victory of at least 8 (Greco-Roman) or 10 (freestyle) points.

Athlete	Event	Qualification	Round of 16	Quarterfinal	Semi-final	Repechage 1	Repechage 2	Final / BM	
Athlete	Event	Opposition Result	Opposition Result	Opposition Result	Opposition Result	Opposition Result	Opposition Result	Opposition Result	Rank
Men's Freestyle
Haji Aliyev	−57 kg	Bye	Yun J-s (KOR); W 4–1 ^{SP}	Khinchegashvili (GEO); L 1–3 ^{PP}	Did not advance	Bye	Sanayev (KAZ); W 3–1 ^{PP}	Dubov (BUL); W 5–0 ^{VT}	3rd place, bronze medalist(s)
Toghrul Asgarov	−65 kg	Bye	Kvyatkovskyy (UKR); W 4–1 ^{SP}	Molinaro (USA); W 4–0 ^{ST}	Chamizo (ITA); W 3–1 ^{PP}	Bye		Ramonov (RUS); L 0–4 ^{ST}	2nd place, silver medalist(s)
Jabrayil Hasanov	−74 kg	Bye	Izquierdo (COL); W 4–0 ^{ST}	Makarashvili (GEO); W 4–0 ^{ST}	Geduev (RUS); L 1–3 ^{PP}	Bye		Abdurakhmonov (UZB); W 3–1 ^{PP}	3rd place, bronze medalist(s)
Sharif Sharifov	−86 kg	Bye	Bi Sf (CHN); W 4–0 ^{ST}	Baranowski (POL); W 3–0 ^{PO}	Sadulaev (RUS); L 1–3 ^{PP}	Bye		Ceballos (VEN); W 3–1 ^{PP}	3rd place, bronze medalist(s)
Khetag Gazyumov	−97 kg	Baran (POL); W 3–0 ^{PO}	Yazdani (IRI); W 3–1 ^{PP}	Ibragimov (UZB); W 3–1 ^{PP}	Andriitsev (UKR); W 4–0 ^{ST}	Bye		Snyder (USA); L 1–3 ^{PP}	2nd place, silver medalist(s)
Jamaladdin Magomedov	−125 kg	Bye	Dlagnev (USA); L 1–3 ^{PP}	Did not advance					12
Men's Greco-Roman
Rovshan Bayramov	−59 kg	Bye	Rodríguez (VEN); W 4–0 ^{ST}	Thielke (USA); W 4–0 ^{ST}	Ota (JPN); L 0–5 ^{VT}	Bye		Berge (NOR); L 1–3 ^{PP}	5
Rasul Chunayev	−66 kg	Martínez (CUB); W 3–1 ^{PP}	Albiev (RUS); W 3–1 ^{PP}	Benaissa (ALG); W 4–1 ^{SP}	Arutyunyan (ARM); L 1–3 ^{PP}	Bye		Ryu H-s (KOR); W 4–0 ^{ST}	3rd place, bronze medalist(s)
Elvin Mursaliyev	−75 kg	Fawzy (EGY); W 3–1 ^{PP}	Kartikov (KAZ); W 3–1 ^{PP}	Bácsi (HUN); L 0–3 ^{PO}	Did not advance				7
Saman Tahmasebi	−85 kg	Chakvetadze (RUS); L 0–3 ^{PO}	Did not advance			Akhlaghi (IRI); L 1–3 ^{PP}	Did not advance		13
Sabah Shariati	−130 kg	Bye	Smith (USA); W 3–1 ^{PP}	Kayaalp (TUR); L 0–5 ^{VT}	Did not advance	Bye	Caraballo (VEN); W 3–0 ^{PO}	Popp (GER); W 5–0 ^{VT}	3rd place, bronze medalist(s)
Women's Freestyle
Mariya Stadnik	−48 kg	Bye	Bermúdez (ARG); W 4–0 ^{ST}	Matkowska (POL); W 4–0 ^{ST}	Yankova (BUL); W 5–0 ^{VT}	Bye		Tosaka (JPN); L 2–3 ^{PP}	2nd place, silver medalist(s)
Nataliya Synyshyn	−53 kg	Bye	Yoshida (JPN); L 0–3 ^{PO}	Did not advance		Bye	Sambou (SEN); W 3–0 ^{PO}	Argüello (VEN); W 3–1 ^{PP}	3rd place, bronze medalist(s)
Yuliya Ratkevich	−58 kg	Bye	Herhel (UKR); W 3–1 ^{PP}	Rentería (COL); W 3–1 ^{PP}	Icho (JPN); L 0–4 ^{ST}	Bye		Amri (TUN); L 1–3 ^{PP}	5

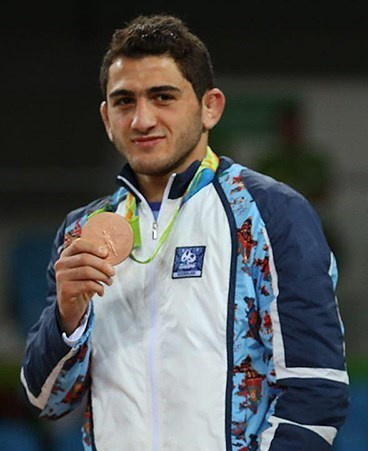
Bronze medalist Haji Aliyev

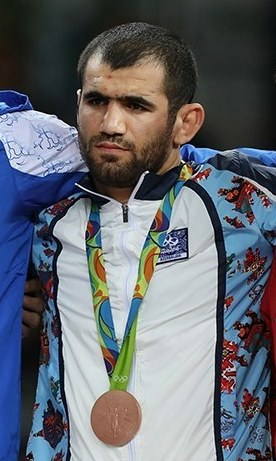
Bronze medalist Jabrayil Hasanov

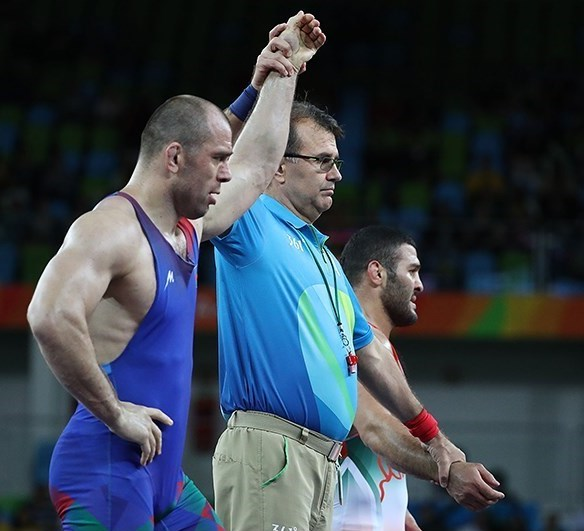
Silver medalist Khetag Gazyumov (left) and Reza Yazdani

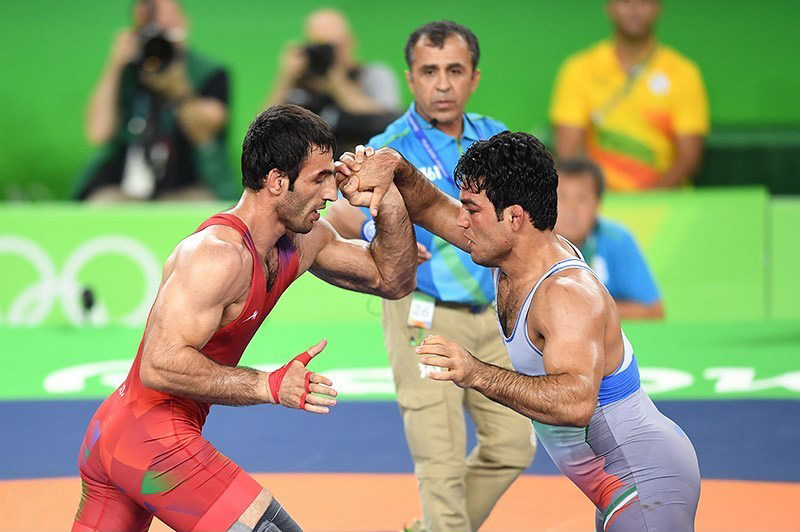
Saman Tahmasebi (red) fought against Iran's Habibollah Akhlaghi

== See also ==
- Azerbaijan at the 2016 Summer Paralympics
