= Aniya Louissaint =

Haitian taekwondo practitioner

Personal information
- Nationality: Haitian
- Born: 9 September 1998 (age 27)

Sport
- Sport: Taekwondo

Aniya Louissaint (born 9 September 1998) is a Haitian taekwondo athlete.

She represented Haiti at the 2016 Summer Olympics in Rio de Janeiro, in the women's 67 kg where she was defeated by Haby Niaré in the first round and by Ruth Gbagbi in the repechage round.
