= Rayssa Costa =

Brazilian fencer (born 1991)

Personal information
- Born: 16 March 1991 (age 35) Brasília, Brazil

Sport
- Sport: Fencing
Medal record
Representing Brazil
Pan American Games
Bronze medal – third place	2015 Toronto	Team épée
South American Games
Silver medal – second place	2010 Medellin	Team épée

Rayssa Costa de Oliveira (born 16 March 1991) is a Brazilian fencer. She competed in the women's épée event at the 2016 Summer Olympics.
