= Fencing at the 2016 Summer Olympics =

Fencing at the Games of the XXXI Olympiad
- Venue: Carioca Arena 3
- Dates: 6–14 August 2016
- No. of events: 10
- Competitors: 212 from 48 nations

The fencing competitions at the 2016 Summer Olympics in Rio de Janeiro took place from 6 to 14 August at the Carioca Arena 3 inside the Barra Olympic Park in Barra da Tijuca. Around 212 fencers (an equal distribution between men and women; of which, eight fencers came from the host nation Brazil) competed in 10 events -- six individual and four team.

Similar to 2008 and 2012, the International Fencing Federation maintained the format of ten events with a rotation system for team events. As a result, the men's team sabre and the women's team foil were dropped from the program only at these Games.

== Qualification ==
Qualification was primarily based on the FIE official rankings as of 4 April 2016, with further individual places available at four zonal qualifying tournaments.

== Participating nations ==
- Algeria (2)
- Argentina (1)
- Austria (1)
- Azerbaijan (1)
- Belarus (1)
- Belgium (1)
- Benin (1)
- Brazil (13)
- Bulgaria (1)
- Canada (5)
- China (11)
- Colombia (2)
- Cuba (1)
- Czech Republic (2)
- Egypt (7)
- Estonia (5)
- France (15)
- Georgia (1)
- Germany (4)
- Great Britain (3)
- Greece (2)
- Hong Kong (3)
- Hungary (9)
- Iran (2)
- Italy (14)
- Ivory Coast (1)
- Japan (6)
- Kazakhstan (1)
- Kuwait (1)
- Lebanon (1)
- Mexico (7)
- Morocco (1)
- Netherlands (1)
- Panama (1)
- Poland (4)
- Romania (6)
- Russia (16)
- Saudi Arabia (1)
- Senegal (1)
- South Korea (14)
- Switzerland (4)
- Tunisia (5)
- Turkey (1)
- Ukraine (10)
- United States (14)
- Venezuela (6)
- Vietnam (4)

== Schedule ==
Daily schedule
Date →	Sat 6	Sun 7	Mon 8	Tue 9	Wed 10	Thu 11	Fri 12	Sat 13	Sun 14
Men's		Foil individual		Épée individual	Sabre individual		Foil team		Épée team
Women's	Épée individual		Sabre individual		Foil individual	Épée team		Sabre team	

== Medal summary ==
=== Medal table ===
* Host nation (Brazil)

Rank	Nation	Gold	Silver	Bronze	Total
1	Russia	4	1	2	7
2	Hungary	2	1	1	4
3	Italy	1	3	0	4
4	France	1	1	1	3
5	South Korea	1	0	1	2
6	Romania	1	0	0	1
7	United States	0	2	2	4
8	China	0	1	1	2
8	Ukraine	0	1	1	2
10	Tunisia	0	0	1	1
Totals (10 entries)		10	10	10	30

=== Men's ===
Games	Gold	Silver	Bronze
Individual épée	Park Sang-young; South Korea	Géza Imre; Hungary	Gauthier Grumier; France
Team épée	France; Gauthier Grumier; Yannick Borel; Daniel Jérent; Jean-Michel Lucenay	Italy; Enrico Garozzo; Marco Fichera; Paolo Pizzo; Andrea Santarelli	Hungary; Gábor Boczkó; Géza Imre; András Rédli; Péter Somfai
Individual foil	Daniele Garozzo; Italy	Alexander Massialas; United States	Timur Safin; Russia
Team foil	Russia; Timur Safin; Artur Akhmatkhuzin; Aleksey Cheremisinov	France; Jérémy Cadot; Enzo Lefort; Erwan Le Péchoux; Jean-Paul Tony Helissey	United States; Miles Chamley-Watson; Race Imboden; Alexander Massialas; Gerek Meinhardt
Individual sabre	Áron Szilágyi; Hungary	Daryl Homer; United States	Kim Jung-hwan; South Korea

=== Women's ===
Games	Gold	Silver	Bronze
Individual épée	Emese Szász; Hungary	Rossella Fiamingo; Italy	Sun Yiwen; China
Team épée	Romania; Loredana Dinu; Simona Gherman; Simona Pop; Ana Maria Popescu	China; Hao Jialu; Sun Yiwen; Sun Yujie; Xu Anqi	Russia; Olga Kochneva; Violetta Kolobova; Tatiana Logunova; Lyubov Shutova
Individual foil	Inna Deriglazova; Russia	Elisa Di Francisca; Italy	Inès Boubakri; Tunisia
Individual sabre	Yana Egorian; Russia	Sofiya Velikaya; Russia	Olha Kharlan; Ukraine
Team sabre	Russia; Sofia Velikaya; Yana Egorian; Ekaterina Dyachenko; Yuliya Gavrilova	Ukraine; Olha Kharlan; Olena Kravatska; Alina Komashchuk; Olena Voronina	United States; Monica Aksamit; Ibtihaj Muhammad; Dagmara Wozniak; Mariel Zagunis

== See also ==
- Wheelchair fencing at the 2016 Summer Paralympics
