= Taekwondo at the 2016 Summer Olympics – Women's 67 kg =

Taekwondo competition

Women's 67kg at the Games of the XXXI Olympiad
- Venue: Carioca Arena 3
- Date: 19 August 2016
- Competitors: 16 from 16 nations

Medalists
1st place, gold medalist(s)		Oh Hye-ri	South Korea
2nd place, silver medalist(s)		Haby Niaré	France
3rd place, bronze medalist(s)		Ruth Gbagbi	Ivory Coast
3rd place, bronze medalist(s)		Nur Tatar	Turkey

The women's 67 kg competition at the 2016 Summer Olympics was held on 19 August, at the Carioca Arena 3.

== Competition format ==
The main bracket consisted of a single elimination tournament, culminating in the gold medal match. The top eight athletes in each event were seeded so as not to face each other in the preliminary round. The remainder of the qualified athletes were drawn randomly on 15 August 2016. Two bronze medals were awarded at the Taekwondo competitions. A repechage was used to determine the bronze medal winners. Every competitor who lost to one of the two finalists competed in the repechage, another single-elimination competition. Each semifinal loser faced the last remaining repechage competitor from the opposite half of the bracket in a bronze medal match.

== Schedule ==
All times are in local time (UTC−3).

Date	Time	Round
Friday, 19 August 2016	09:00; 15:00; 17:00; 20:00; 21:00; 22:00	Preliminary round Quarterfinals; Semifinals; Repechage; Bronze medal matches Final

== Seeds ==
Every practitioner was seeded at the event. Practitioners representing the hosting nation were seeded as no. 4 regardless of their current world ranking.

1. Haby Niaré (FRA)
2. Elin Johansson (SWE)
3. Chuang Chia-chia (TPE)
4. Nur Tatar (TUR)
5. Anastasia Baryshnikova (RUS)
6. Oh Hye-Ri (KOR)
7. Paige McPherson (USA)
8. Seham El-Sawalhy (EGY)
9. Ruth Gbagbi (CIV)
10. Farida Azizova (AZE)
11. Melissa Pagnotta (CAN)
12. Rabia Gülec (GER)
13. Carmen Marton (AUS)
14. Cansel Deniz (KAZ)
15. Nigora Tursunkulova (UZB)
16. Aniya Louissaint (HAI)

== Results ==
Legend

- PTG – Won by points gap
- SUD – Won by sudden death
- SUP – Won by superiority

=== Main bracket ===
Preliminary round
13	Carmen Marton (AUS)	1
4	Nur Tatar (TUR)	11
5	Anastasia Baryshnikova (RUS)	8
12	Rabia Gülec (GER)	9
9	Ruth Gbagbi (CIV)	4
8	Seham El-Sawalhy (EGY)	3
1	Haby Niaré (FRA)	5
16	Aniya Louissaint (HAI)	4
15	Nigora Tursunkulova (UZB)	2 (SUP)
2	Elin Johansson (SWE)	2
7	Paige McPherson (USA)	5
10	Farida Azizova (AZE)	6
11	Melissa Pagnotta (CAN)	3
6	Oh Hye-ri (KOR)	9
3	Chuang Chia-chia (TPE)	16 (PTG)
14	Cansel Deniz (KAZ)	2

Quarterfinals
4	Nur Tatar (TUR)	5
12	Rabia Gülec (GER)	1
9	Ruth Gbagbi (CIV)	4
1	Haby Niaré (FRA)	5
15	Nigora Tursunkulova (UZB)	1
10	Farida Azizova (AZE)	5
6	Oh Hye-ri (KOR)	21 (PTG)
3	Chuang Chia-chia (TPE)	9

Semifinals
4	Nur Tatar (TUR)	0
1	Haby Niaré (FRA)	4 (SUD)
10	Farida Azizova (AZE)	5
6	Oh Hye-ri (KOR)	6

Gold medal match
1	Haby Niaré (FRA)	12
6	Oh Hye-ri (KOR)	13

=== Repechage ===
Repechage
Ruth Gbagbi (CIV)	7
Aniya Louissaint (HAI)	2
Melissa Pagnotta (CAN)	1
Chuang Chia-chia (TPE)	4

Bronze medal matches
Farida Azizova (AZE)	1
Ruth Gbagbi (CIV)	7
Chuang Chia-chia (TPE)	3
Nur Tatar (TUR)	7
