= Rabia Gülec =

German taekwondo practitioner

Personal information
- Nationality: German
- Born: 5 June 1994 (age 32) Nuremberg, Germany
- Height: 175 cm (5 ft 9 in)
- Weight: 62 kg (137 lb)

Sport
- Country: Germany
- Sport: Taekwondo

Rabia Gülec (also spelled Guelec; born 5 June 1994 in Nuremberg) is a German taekwondo athlete. She represented Germany at the 2016 Summer Olympics in Rio de Janeiro, in the women's 67 kg. She finished in 9th place after losing to eventual bronze medalist Nur Tatar of Turkey in the quarterfinals.
