= Taekwondo at the 2016 Summer Olympics – Men's 80 kg =

Men's 80kg at the Games of the XXXI Olympiad
- Venue: Carioca Arena 3
- Date: 19 August 2016
- Competitors: 16 from 16 nations

Medalists
1st place, gold medalist(s)		Cheick Sallah Cissé	Ivory Coast
2nd place, silver medalist(s)		Lutalo Muhammad	Great Britain
3rd place, bronze medalist(s)		Oussama Oueslati	Tunisia
3rd place, bronze medalist(s)		Milad Beigi	Azerbaijan

The men's 80 kg taekwondo competition at the 2016 Summer Olympics was held on 19 August, at the Carioca Arena 3. This event featured five-time Olympian and three-time Olympic medalist Steven López, representing the United States. López has competed in every Olympic game since 2000. Cheick Sallah Cissé won the event for Côte d'Ivoire, the country's first Olympic gold.

== Competition format ==
The main bracket consisted of a single elimination tournament, culminating in the gold medal match. The top eight athletes in each event were seeded so as not to face each other in the preliminary round. The remainder of the qualified athletes were drawn randomly on 15 August 2016. Two bronze medals were awarded at the Taekwondo competitions. A repechage was used to determine the bronze medal winners. Every competitor who lost to one of the two finalists competed in the repechage, another single-elimination competition. Each semifinal loser faced the last remaining repechage competitor from the opposite half of the bracket in a bronze medal match.

== Schedule ==
All times are in local time (UTC-3).

Date	Time	Round
Friday, 19 August 2016	09:15; 15:15; 17:15; 20:15; 21:15; 22:15	Preliminary round Quarterfinals; Semifinals; Repechage; Bronze medal matches Final

== Seeds ==
Every practitioner was seeded at the event. Practitioners representing the hosting nation were seeded as no. 4 regardless of their current world ranking.

1. Mehdi Khodabakhshi (IRI)
2. Aaron Cook (MDA)
3. Cheick Sallah Cissé (CIV)
4. Albert Gaun (RUS)
5. Lutalo Muhammad (GBR)
6. Tahir Güleç (GER)
7. Nikita Rafalovich (UZB)
8. Ismaël Coulibaly (MLI)
9. Milad Beigi (AZE)
10. Oussama Oueslati (TUN)
11. Moisés Hernández (DOM)
12. Hayder Shkara (AUS)
13. Steven López (USA)
14. Piotr Paziński (POL)
15. Liu Wei-ting (TPE)
16. Miguel Ferrera (HON)

== Results ==
=== Main bracket ===
Legend

- PTG — Won by points gap
- SUD — Won by sudden death

Preliminary round
13	Steven López (USA)	7
4	Albert Gaun (RUS)	4
5	Lutalo Muhammad (GBR)	14 (PTG)
12	Hayder Shkara (AUS)	0
9	Milad Beigi (AZE)	13
8	Ismaël Coulibaly (MLI)	6
1	Mehdi Khodabakhshi (IRI)	13 (PTG)
16	Miguel Ferrera (HON)	1
15	Liu Wei-ting (TPE)	14 (PTG)
2	Aaron Cook (MDA)	2
7	Nikita Rafalovich (UZB)	8
10	Oussama Oueslati (TUN)	11 (SUD)
11	Moisés Hernández (DOM)	2
6	Tahir Güleç (GER)	4
3	Cheick Sallah Cissé (CIV)	8
14	Piotr Paziński (POL)	2

Quarterfinals
13	Steven López (USA)	2
5	Lutalo Muhammad (GBR)	9
9	Milad Beigi (AZE)	17 (PTG)
1	Mehdi Khodabakhshi (IRI)	5
15	Liu Wei-ting (TPE)	0
10	Oussama Oueslati (TUN)	1 (SUD)
6	Tahir Güleç (GER)	1
3	Cheick Sallah Cissé (CIV)	7

Semifinals
5	Lutalo Muhammad (GBR)	12
9	Milad Beigi (AZE)	7
10	Oussama Oueslati (TUN)	6
3	Cheick Sallah Cissé (CIV)	7

Gold medal match
5	Lutalo Muhammad (GBR)	6
3	Cheick Sallah Cissé (CIV)	8

=== Repechage ===
Repechage
Steven López (USA)	0 (SUP)
Hayder Shkara (AUS)	0
Piotr Paziński (POL)	6 (SUD)
Tahir Güleç (GER)	5

Bronze medal matches
Oussama Oueslati (TUN)	14
Steven López (USA)	5
Piotr Paziński (POL)	0
Milad Beigi (AZE)	12 (PTG)
