= Carioca Arena 3 =

Indoor stadium in Barra da Tijuca in the west zone of Rio de Janeiro

- Arena Carioca 3
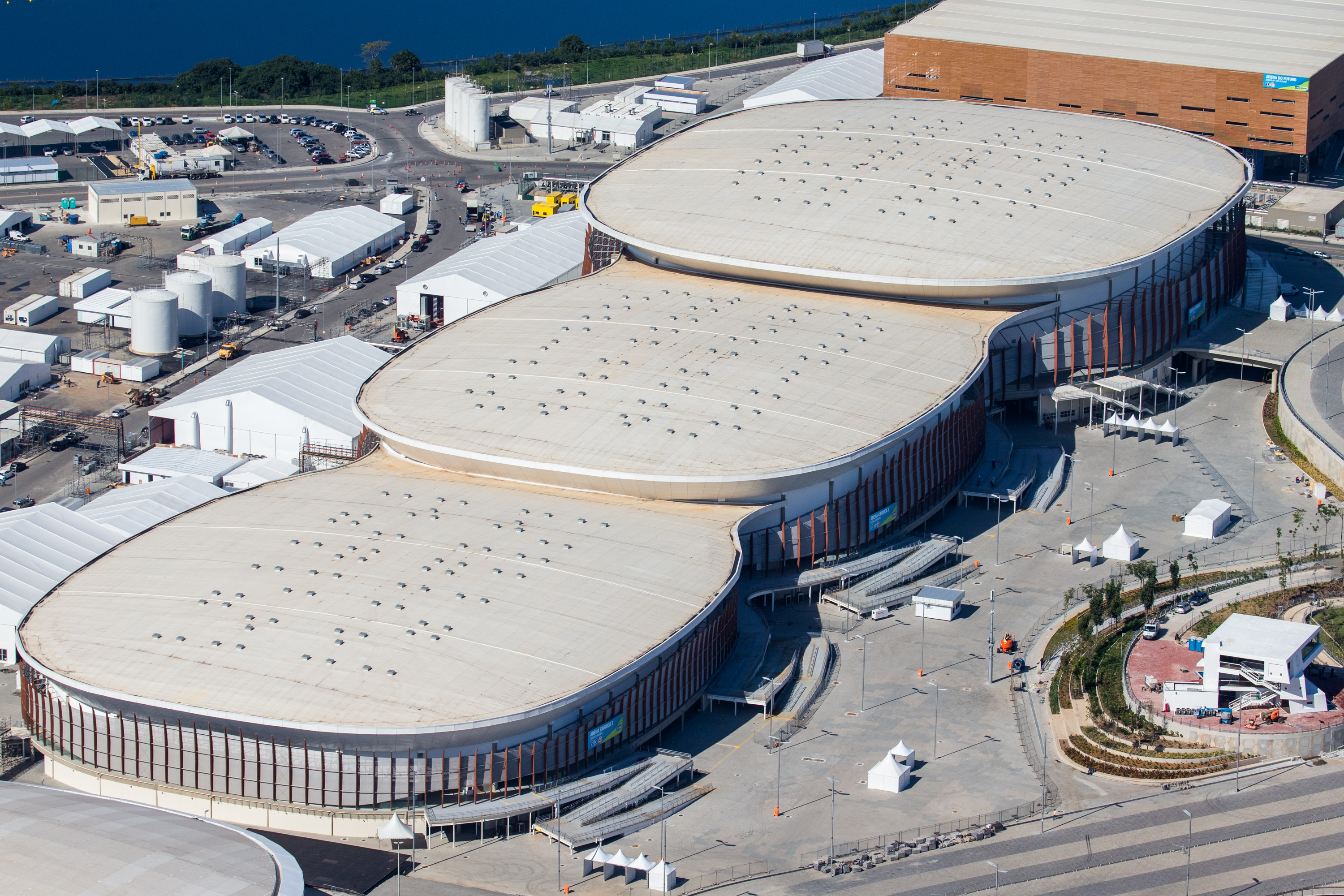
- Aerial view of the Carioca complex at Barra Olympic Park in May 2016; Arena 3 is visible at bottom left
- Interactive map of Carioca Arena 3
- Location: Barra Olympic Park; Barra da Tijuca, Rio de Janeiro, Brazil
- Coordinates: 22.9766°S 43.3924°W
- Owner: City of Rio de Janeiro
- Capacity: 10,000 (Olympics)

Construction
- Opened: 2016

Carioca Arena 3 (Portuguese: Arena Carioca 3), now named the Isabel Salgado Olympic Educational Gymnasium, is a sports training school and indoor stadium in Barra da Tijuca in the west zone of Rio de Janeiro, Brazil. The venue hosted taekwondo and fencing competitions at the 2016 Summer Olympics and the judo and wheelchair fencing competitions at the 2016 Summer Paralympics. Carioca Arena 3 was planned to be transformed into a sports high school after the Games.

During the COVID-19 pandemic in Brazil, the structure of Carioca Arena 3 was used as a base for the health workers on vaccination programme. As of February 2022, the Arena is open for children engaged in sports activities promoted by the prefecture of Rio de Janeiro. In December, the plans for a sports training school were finally put into place, with the facility to be renamed Isabel Salgado Olympic Educational Gymnasium (Portuguese: Ginásio Educacional Olímpico Isabel Salgado, homaging recently deceased volleyball player Isabel Salgado). It serves 5000 students.

== See also ==
- Carioca Arena 1
- Carioca Arena 2
- List of indoor arenas in Brazil
