= Cheick Sallah Cissé =

Ivorian taekwondo practitioner

Personal information
- Full name: Cheick Sallah Cissé Junior
- Nickname: Polozo
- Nationality: Ivorian
- Born: 19 September 1993 (age 32) Bouaké, Côte d'Ivoire
- Height: 189 cm (6 ft 2 in)

Sport
- Sport: Taekwondo
- Event: –80 kg
- Club: INEKA Taekwondo
Medal record
Men's taekwondo
Representing Ivory Coast
Olympic Games
Gold medal – first place	2016 Rio De Janeiro	80 kg
Bronze medal – third place	2024 Paris	+80 kg
World Championships
Gold medal – first place	2023 Baku	+87 kg
Grand Prix
Gold medal – first place	2015 Moscow	80 kg
Gold medal – first place	2017 Rabat	80 kg
Gold medal – first place	2017 London	80 kg
Gold medal – first place	2017 Abidjan (F)	80 kg
Gold medal – first place	2022 Riyadh (F)	+80 kg
Gold medal – first place	2023 Paris	+80 kg
Gold medal – first place	2023 Manchester (F)	+80 kg
Silver medal – second place	2015 Samsun	80 kg
Silver medal – second place	2018 Taoyuan	80 kg
Silver medal – second place	2022 Rome	+80 kg
Bronze medal – third place	2015 Manchester	80 kg
Bronze medal – third place	2017 Moscow	80 kg
Bronze medal – third place	2018 Fujairah (F)	80 kg
Bronze medal – third place	2019 Rome	80 kg
Bronze medal – third place	2022 Paris	+80 kg
Bronze medal – third place	2022 Manchester	+80 kg
African Games
Gold medal – first place	2015 Brazzaville	80 kg
Gold medal – first place	2019 Rabat	80 kg
African Championships
Gold medal – first place	2016 Port Said	80 kg
Gold medal – first place	2021 Dakar	87 kg
Silver medal – second place	2018 Agadir	80 kg
Silver medal – second place	2022 Kigali	87 kg
Bronze medal – third place	2014 Tunis	80 kg
Universiade
Silver medal – second place	2015 Gwangju	80 kg

Cheick Sallah Cissé Junior (born 19 September 1993) is an Ivorian taekwondo athlete. He won the gold medal in the men's heavyweight event at the 2023 World Taekwondo Championships held in Baku, Azerbaijan.

After winning gold at the 2015 African Games in the men's 80 kg, he represented Ivory Coast at the 2016 Summer Olympics in Rio de Janeiro in the same category. He reached the final of the tournament, competing against Britain's Lutalo Muhammad. Behind by six points to five, Cissé scored with a head-kick in the final second of the match to win the tie 8–6 and take the gold medal. The gold was Ivory Coast's first ever Olympic title, and came on a night where Ruth Gbagbi won a bronze in the women's 67 kg taekwondo, increasing the country's all-time Olympic medals from one to three in one session.

He also qualified for the 2020 Summer Olympics in the men's 80 kg event.

Olympic Games
Preceded by Murielle Ahouré	Flagbearer for Ivory Coast; Tokyo 2020 with Marie-Josée Ta Lou; Paris 2024 with Maboundou Koné	Succeeded by Incumbent
