= Milad Beigi =

Azerbaijani taekwondo practitioner

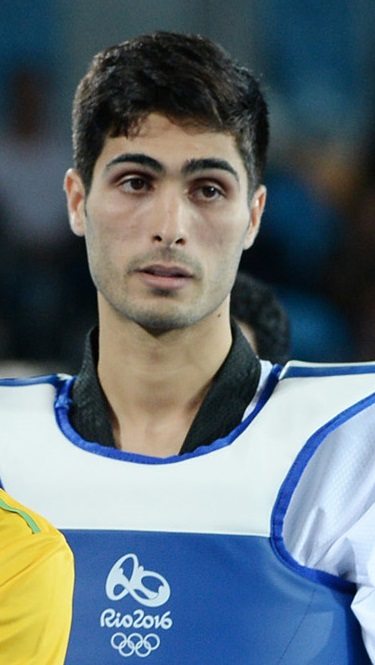
- Beigi at the 2016 Olympics

Personal information
- Native name: Milad Bəygi Hərçəqani
- Full name: Milad Beigi Harchegani
- Born: 1 March 1991 (age 35) Isfahan, Iran
- Height: 1.94 m (6 ft 4 in)
- Weight: 80 kg (176 lb)

Sport
- Sport: Taekwondo
- Club: Gilan Taekwondo Club (AZE)
- Coached by: Elnur Amanov (national); Reza Mehmandoust (personal)
Medal record
Event	1st	2nd	3rd
Olympic Games	–	–	1
World Championships	2	–	–
Grand Slam	–	–	2
Grand Prix	2	1	1
European Games	1	–	–
European Championships	1	1	1
Universiade	1	–	–
Islamic Solidarity Games	1	–	–
Representing Azerbaijan
Olympic Games
Bronze medal – third place	2016 Rio De Janeiro	80 kg
World Championships
Gold medal – first place	2017 Muju	80 kg
Gold medal – first place	2019 Manchester	80 kg
Grand Slam
Bronze medal – third place	2017 Wuxi	80 kg
Bronze medal – third place	2018 Wuxi	80 kg
Grand Prix
Gold medal – first place	2016 Baku	80 kg
Gold medal – first place	2019 Chiba	80 kg
Silver medal – second place	2019 Moscow (F)	80 kg
Bronze medal – third place	2017 Rabat	80 kg
European Games
Gold medal – first place	2015 Baku	80 kg
European Championships
Gold medal – first place	2016 Montreux	80 kg
Bronze medal – third place	2018 Kazan	80 kg
Silver medal – second place	2021 Sofia	80 kg
Islamic Solidarity Games
Gold medal – first place	2017 Baku	80 kg
Universiade
Gold medal – first place	2017 Taipei	80 kg
- Updated on 27 March 2017

Milad Beigi Harchegani (Persian: میلاد بیگی هرچگانی, Azerbaijani: Milad Beygi Hərçigani; born 1 March 1991 in Isfahan) is an Iranian-born naturalized Azerbaijani taekwondo practitioner who won a bronze medal at the 2016 Summer Olympics. Harchegani is of Qashqai ancestry.

In February 2015, Beigi won the −80 kg gold medal at the 26th Fajr Cup for Iran's B team. He was considered among Iran's prospects in the 2015 World Taekwondo Championships, but it was declared that he had been replaced due to "injury" despite allegations that he had left threatening to acquire citizenship of another country. He was named the Male Most Valuable Player at the 2015 World Cup Team Championships. He won a bronze medal at the 2016 Summer Olympics after beating Piotr Pazinsky in the bronze medal match.
