= Oussama Oueslati =

Tunisian taekwondo athlete

Personal information
- Nationality: Tunisian
- Born: 24 March 1996 (age 30) La Manouba, Tunisia
- Height: 199 cm (6 ft 6 in)

Sport
- Country: Tunisia
- Sport: Taekwondo
Medal record
Representing Tunisia
Men's taekwondo
Olympic Games
Bronze medal – third place	2016 Rio de Janeiro	80 kg

Oussama Oueslati (born 24 March 1996) is a Tunisian taekwondo athlete. He represented Tunisia at the 2016 Summer Olympics in Rio de Janeiro and won a bronze medal in the men's 80 kg. He was the flag bearer for Tunisia in the closing ceremony.
