= South Korea at the 2016 Summer Olympics =

- IOC code: KOR
- NOC: Korean Olympic Committee
- Website: www.sports.or.kr (in Korean and English)

in Rio de Janeiro
- Competitors: 205 in 24 sports
- Flag bearers: Gu Bon-gil (opening); Kim Hyeon-woo (closing)
- Medals Ranked 8th: Gold 9 Silver 3 Bronze 9 Total 21

Summer Olympics appearances (overview)
- 1948; 1952; 1956; 1960; 1964; 1968; 1972; 1976; 1980; 1984; 1988; 1992; 1996; 2000; 2004; 2008; 2012; 2016; 2020; 2024; 2028

South Korea, officially the Republic of Korea, competed at the 2016 Summer Olympics in Rio de Janeiro, Brazil, from 5 to 21 August 2016. This was the nation's seventeenth appearance at the Olympics. The Korean Olympic Committee sent the nation's smallest ever delegation to the Games in Olympic history since 1984. A total of 205 athletes, 103 men and 101 women, competed in 24 sports.

== Medalists ==
The following South Korean competitors won medals at the Games. In the by discipline sections below, medalists' names are bolded.

Medal	Name	Sport	Event	Date
Gold	Kim Woo-jin; Ku Bon-chan; Lee Seung-yun	Archery	Men's team	August 6
Gold	Chang Hye-jin; Choi Mi-sun; Ki Bo-bae	Archery	Women's team	August 7
Gold	Park Sang-young	Fencing	Men's épée	August 9
Gold	Jin Jong-oh	Shooting	Men's 50 m pistol	August 10
Gold	Chang Hye-jin	Archery	Women's individual	August 11
Gold	Ku Bon-chan	Archery	Men's individual	August 12
Gold	Kim So-hui	Taekwondo	Women's 49 kg	August 17
Gold	Oh Hye-ri	Taekwondo	Women's 67 kg	August 19
Gold	Park Inbee	Golf	Women's individual	August 20
Silver	Jeong Bo-kyeong	Judo	Women's 48 kg	August 6
Silver	An Ba-ul	Judo	Men's 66 kg	August 7
Silver	Kim Jong-hyun	Shooting	Men's 50 m rifle prone	August 12
Bronze	Yoon Jin-hee	Weightlifting	Women's 53 kg	August 7
Bronze	Gwak Dong-han	Judo	Men's 90 kg	August 10
Bronze	Kim Jung-hwan	Fencing	Men's sabre	August 10
Bronze	Ki Bo-bae	Archery	Women's individual	August 11
Bronze	Kim Hyeon-woo	Wrestling	Men's Greco-Roman 75 kg	August 14
Bronze	Kim Tae-hun	Taekwondo	Men's 58 kg	August 17
Bronze	Lee Dae-hoon	Taekwondo	Men's 68 kg	August 18
Bronze	Jung Kyung-eun; Shin Seung-chan	Badminton	Women's doubles	August 18
Bronze	Cha Dong-min	Taekwondo	Men's +80 kg	August 20

Medals by sport
**Sport**	1st place, gold medalist(s)	2nd place, silver medalist(s)	3rd place, bronze medalist(s)	**Total**
Archery	4	0	1	5
Taekwondo	2	0	3	5
Fencing	1	0	1	2
Shooting	1	1	0	2
Golf	1	0	0	1
Judo	0	2	1	3
Weightlifting	0	0	1	1
Wrestling	0	0	1	1
Badminton	0	0	1	1
Total	9	3	9	21

Medals by day
**Day**	1st place, gold medalist(s)	2nd place, silver medalist(s)	3rd place, bronze medalist(s)	**Total**
August 6	1	1	0	2
August 7	1	1	1	3
August 8	0	0	0	0
August 9	1	0	0	1
August 10	1	0	2	3
August 11	1	0	1	2
August 12	1	1	0	2
August 13	0	0	0	0
August 14	0	0	1	1
August 15	0	0	0	0
August 16	0	0	0	0
August 17	1	0	1	2
August 18	0	0	2	2
August 19	1	0	0	1
August 20	1	0	1	2
August 21	0	0	0	0
Total	9	3	9	21

== Competitors ==
The Korean Olympic Committee (KOC) selected a team of 204 athletes, 103 men and 101 women, to compete in 22 sports; it was the nation's smallest team sent to the Olympics since 1984, just six athletes relatively short of its size. South Korea did not qualify athletes in basketball, rugby sevens, tennis, and triathlon.

The following is the list of number of competitors participating in the Games. Note that reserves in fencing, field hockey, football, and handball are not counted as athletes:

Sport	Men	Women	Total
Archery	3	3	6
Athletics	10	5	15
Badminton	7	7	14
Boxing	1	0	1
Canoeing	2	0	2
Cycling	7	2	9
Diving	1	0	1
Equestrian	1	0	1
Fencing	6	8	14
Field hockey	0	16	16
Football	18	0	18
Golf	2	4	6
Gymnastics	5	2	7
Handball	0	14	14
Judo	7	5	12
Modern pentathlon	2	1	3
Rowing	1	1	2
Sailing	4	0	4
Shooting	9	8	17
Swimming	3	5	8
Table tennis	3	3	6
Taekwondo	3	2	5
Volleyball	0	12	12
Weightlifting	4	3	7
Wrestling	5	0	5
Total	103	101	205

== Archery ==
South Korean archers qualified each for the men's and women's events after having secured a top eight finish in their respective team recurves at the 2015 World Archery Championships in Copenhagen, Denmark.

With a top eight placement at the Worlds, the spots for the three men and three women from South Korea will be determined in two national selection meets by April 2016. The South Korean archery team, led by London 2012 Olympic champion Ki Bo-bae, was announced on April 19, 2016. On August 5, 2016, Kim Woo-jin set a world record by scoring 700 out of a possible 720 in the seeding round of the men's individual recurve.

Men

Athlete	Event	Ranking round		Round of 64	Round of 32	Round of 16	Quarterfinals	Semifinals	Final / BM	
Athlete	Event	Score	Seed	Opposition Score	Opposition Score	Opposition Score	Opposition Score	Opposition Score	Opposition Score	Rank
Kim Woo-jin	Individual	700 WR	1	Sutherland (ZIM); W 6–0	Agatha (INA); L 2–6	Did not advance				
Ku Bon-chan	Individual	681	6	Baláž (SVK); W 6–0	Huston (GBR); W 6–0	Floto (GER); W 6–4	Worth (AUS); W 6–5	Ellison (USA); W 6–5	Valladont (FRA); W 7–3	1st place, gold medalist(s)
Lee Seung-yun	Individual	676	12	Xavier (BRA); W 6–2	Alvariño (ESP); W 7–1	Das (IND); W 6–4	van den Berg (NED); L 4–6	Did not advance		
Kim Woo-jin; Ku Bon-chan; Lee Seung-yun	Team	2057	1	—N/a		Bye	Netherlands; W 6–0	Australia; W 6–0	United States; W 6–0	1st place, gold medalist(s)

Women

Athlete	Event	Ranking round		Round of 64	Round of 32	Round of 16	Quarterfinals	Semifinals	Final / BM	
Athlete	Event	Score	Seed	Opposition Score	Opposition Score	Opposition Score	Opposition Score	Opposition Score	Opposition Score	Rank
Chang Hye-jin	Individual	666	2	Tatafu (TGA); W 6–0	Sichenikova (UKR); W 6–2	Kang U-j (PRK); W 6–2	Folkard (GBR); W 7–1	Ki B-b (KOR); W 7–3	Unruh (GER); W 6–2	1st place, gold medalist(s)
Choi Mi-sun	Individual	669	1	Camilo (DOM); W 6–0	Le C-y (TPE); W 6–2	Stepanova (RUS); W 7–3	Valencia (MEX); L 0–6	Did not advance		
Ki Bo-bae	Individual	663	3	Anwar (KEN); W 7–1	Marchenko (UKR); W 6–2	Htwe (MYA); W 6–0	Wu Jx (CHN); W 6–2	Chang H-j (KOR); L 3–7	Valencia (MEX); W 6–4	3rd place, bronze medalist(s)
Chang Hye-jin; Choi Mi-sun; Ki Bo-bae	Team	1998	1	—N/a		Bye	Japan; W 5–1	Chinese Taipei; W 5–1	Russia; W 5–1	1st place, gold medalist(s)

== Athletics ==
South Korean athletes have achieved qualifying standards in the following event (up to a maximum of 3 athletes in each event):

Key

- Note–Ranks given for track events are within the athlete's heat only
- Q = Qualified for the next round
- q = Qualified for the next round as a fastest loser or, in field events, by position without achieving the qualifying target
- NR = National record
- N/A = Round not applicable for the event
- Bye = Athlete not required to compete in round

Track & road events
Men

Athlete	Event	Heat		Quarterfinal		Semifinal		Final	
Athlete	Event	Result	Rank	Result	Rank	Result	Rank	Result	Rank
Byun Young-jun	20 km walk	—N/a						1:30:38	61
Choe Byeong-kwang	20 km walk	—N/a						1:29:08	57
Kim Hyun-sub	20 km walk	—N/a						1:21:44	17
Kim Hyun-sub	50 km walk	—N/a						DNF	
Kim Kuk-young	100 m	Bye		10.37	7	Did not advance			
Park Chil-sung	50 km walk	—N/a						DSQ	
Shim Jung-sub	Marathon	—N/a						2:42:42	138
Son Myeong-jun	Marathon	—N/a						2:36:21	131

Women

Athlete	Event	Final	
Athlete	Event	Result	Rank
Ahn Seul-ki	Marathon	2:36:50	42
Jeon Yeong-eun	20 km walk	1:36:31	39
Lee Da-seul	20 km walk	DSQ	
Lee Jeong-eun	20 km walk	DSQ	
Lim Kyung-hee	Marathon	2:43:31	70

Field events

Athlete	Event	Qualification		Final	
Athlete	Event	Distance	Position	Distance	Position
Kim Deok-hyeon	Men's long jump	7.82	14	Did not advance	
Kim Deok-hyeon	Men's triple jump	16.36	27	Did not advance	
Woo Sang-hyeok	Men's high jump	2.26	22	Did not advance	
Yun Seung-hyun	Men's high jump	2.17	43	Did not advance	

== Badminton ==
South Korea qualified a total of fourteen badminton players for each of the following events into the Olympic tournament based on the BWF World Rankings as of 5 May 2016: two entries each in the men's and women's singles, as well as the men's, women's doubles, and one in the mixed doubles.

Men

Athlete	Event	Group Stage				Elimination	Quarterfinal	Semifinal	Final / BM	
Athlete	Event	Opposition Score	Opposition Score	Opposition Score	Rank	Opposition Score	Opposition Score	Opposition Score	Opposition Score	Rank
Lee Dong-keun	Singles	Axelsen (DEN); L (11–21. 13–21)	Ponsana (THA); L (19–21, 21–17, 16–21)	—N/a	2	Did not advance				
Son Wan-ho	Singles	Pochtarev (UKR); W (21–9, 21–15)	Maliekal (RSA); W (21–10, 21–10)	—N/a	1 Q	Ng K L (HKG); W (23–21, 21–17)	Chen L (CHN); L (11–21, 21–18, 11–21)	Did not advance		
Kim Gi-jung; Kim Sa-rang	Doubles	Boe / Mogensen (DEN); W (21–15, 21–18)	Cwalina / Wacha (POL); W (21–14, 21–15)	Ellis / Langridge (GBR); L (21–17, 23–25, 18–21)	1 Q	—N/a	Fu HF / Zhang N (CHN); L (21–11, 18–21, 22–24)	Did not advance		
Lee Yong-dae; Yoo Yeon-seong	Doubles	Lee S-m / Tsai C-h (TPE); W (18–21, 21–13, 21–18)	Ivanov / Sozonov (RUS); L (17–21, 21–19, 16–21)	Chau / Serasinghe (AUS); W (21–14, 21–16)	2 Q	—N/a	Goh V S / Tan W K (MAS); L (21–17, 18–21, 19–21)	Did not advance		

Women

Athlete	Event	Group Stage				Elimination	Quarterfinal	Semifinal	Final / BM	
Athlete	Event	Opposition Score	Opposition Score	Opposition Score	Rank	Opposition Score	Opposition Score	Opposition Score	Opposition Score	Rank
Bae Yeon-ju	Singles	Cicognini (ITA); W (21–11, 21–8)	Bayrak (TUR); W (21–11, 21–7)	—N/a	1 Q	Okuhara (JPN); L (6–21, 7–21)	Did not advance			
Sung Ji-hyun	Singles	Lansac (FRA); W (21–13, 21–14)	Liang (SIN); W (21–17, 21–11)	—N/a	1 Q	Zetchiri (BUL); W (21–15, 21–12)	Marín (ESP); L (12–21, 16–21)	Did not advance		
Chang Ye-na; Lee So-hee	Doubles	Tang Yt / Yu Y (CHN); W (21–18, 14–21, 21–11)	G Stoeva / S Stoeva (BUL); W (24–22, 21–15)	Goliszewski / Nelte (GER); W (21–18, 18–21, 21–17)	1 Q	—N/a	Juhl / Pedersen (DEN); L (26–28, 21–18, 15–21)	Did not advance		
Jung Kyung-eun; Shin Seung-chan	Doubles	Luo Y / Luo Y (CHN); W (21–10, 21–14)	Juhl / Pedersen (DEN); L (16–21, 18–21)	Lee / Obañana (USA); W (21–14, 21–12)	1 Q	—N/a	Muskens / Piek (NED); W (21–13, 20–22, 21–14)	Matsutomo / Takahashi (JPN); L (16–21, 15–21)	Tang Yt / Yu Y (CHN); W (21–8, 21–17)	3rd place, bronze medalist(s)

Mixed

Athlete	Event	Group Stage				Quarterfinal	Semifinal	Final / BM	
Athlete	Event	Opposition Score	Opposition Score	Opposition Score	Rank	Opposition Score	Opposition Score	Opposition Score	Rank
Ko Sung-hyun; Kim Ha-na	Doubles	Chew / Subandhi (USA); W (21–10, 21–12)	Arends / Piek (NED); W (21–10, 21–10)	Kazuno / Kurihara (JPN); W (25–23, 21–17)	1 Q	Xu C / Ma J (CHN); L (17–21, 18–21)	Did not advance		

== Boxing ==
South Korea entered one boxer to compete in the men's bantamweight division into the Olympic competition. Ham Sang-myeong received a spare Olympic berth, as the next highest-ranked boxer, not yet qualified, in the AIBA Pro Boxing (APB) rankings, as France's top boxer Khedafi Djelkhir decided to withdraw from the Games and thereby announce his retirement from the sport.

Athlete	Event	Round of 32	Round of 16	Quarterfinals	Semifinals	Final	
Athlete	Event	Opposition Result	Opposition Result	Opposition Result	Opposition Result	Opposition Result	Rank
Ham Sang-myeong	Men's bantamweight	Rodríguez (VEN); W 2–1	Zhang Jw (CHN); L 0–3	Did not advance			

== Canoeing ==
=== Sprint ===
South Korea qualified a single boat in men's K-2 200 m for the Games at the 2015 Asian Canoe Sprint Championships in Palembang, Indonesia, as the quota spot had been passed to the highest finisher not yet qualified.

Athlete	Event	Heats		Semifinals		Final	
Athlete	Event	Time	Rank	Time	Rank	Time	Rank
Cho Kwang-hee	Men's K-1 200 m	35.402	5 Q	35.869	8 FB	37.265	12
Cho Kwang-hee; Choi Min-kyu	Men's K-2 200 m	33.825	6 Q	33.767	4 FB	33.812	9

Qualification Legend: FA = Qualify to final (medal); FB = Qualify to final B (non-medal)

== Cycling ==
=== Road ===
South Korean riders qualified for a maximum of three quota places in the men's Olympic road race by virtue of their top 4 national ranking in the 2015 UCI Asia Tour. One female rider was added to the South Korean squad to compete in the women's Olympic road race by finishing first at the 2016 Asian Championships.

Athlete	Event	Time	Rank
Kim Ok-cheol	Men's road race	Did not finish	
Seo Joon-yong	Men's road race	Did not finish	
Na Ah-reum	Women's road race	3:58:03	30

=== Track ===
Following the completion of the 2016 UCI Track Cycling World Championships, South Korean riders have accumulated spots in the men's team sprint and men's omnium. As a result of their place in the men's team sprint, South Korea assured its right to enter two riders in both men's sprint and men's keirin. Although South Korea failed to win a quota place in the women's team sprint, they managed to claim a single place in the women's keirin, by virtue of their final individual UCI Olympic rankings in that event.

Sprint

Athlete	Event	Qualification		Round 1	Repechage 1	Round 2	Repechage 2	Quarterfinals	Semifinals	Final	
Athlete	Event	Time Speed (km/h)	Rank	Opposition Time Speed (km/h)	Opposition Time Speed (km/h)	Opposition Time Speed (km/h)	Opposition Time Speed (km/h)	Opposition Time Speed (km/h)	Opposition Time Speed (km/h)	Opposition Time Speed (km/h)	Rank
Kang Dong-jin	Men's sprint	10.092; 71.343	20	Did not advance							

Team sprint

Athlete	Event	Qualification		Semifinals		Final	
Athlete	Event	Time Speed (km/h)	Rank	Opposition Time Speed (km/h)	Rank	Opposition Time Speed (km/h)	Rank
Im Chae-bin; Kang Dong-jin; Son Je-yong	Men's team sprint	REL	9	Did not advance			

Keirin

Athlete	Event	1st Round	Repechage	2nd Round	Final
Athlete	Event	Rank	Rank	Rank	Rank
Im Chae-bin	Men's keirin	6 R	2	Did not advance	
Kang Dong-jin	Men's keirin	3 R	3	Did not advance	
Lee Hye-jin	Women's keirin	2 Q	Bye	4	8

Omnium

Athlete	Event	Scratch race		Individual pursuit			Elimination race		Time trial			Flying lap			Points race		Total points	Rank
Athlete	Event	Rank	Points	Time	Rank	Points	Rank	Points	Time	Rank	Points	Time	Rank	Points	Points	Rank	Total points	Rank
Park Sang-hoon	Men's omnium	9	24	4:29.079	12	18	14	14	1:04.231	12	18	13.489	14	14	DNF	16	88	DNF

== Diving ==
South Korean divers qualified for the following individual and synchronized team spots at the 2016 Olympic Games through the World Championships and the FINA World Cup series.

Athlete	Event	Preliminaries		Semifinals		Final	
Athlete	Event	Points	Rank	Points	Rank	Points	Rank
Woo Ha-ram	Men's 3 m springboard	364.10	24	Did not advance			
Woo Ha-ram	Men's 10 m platform	438.45	11 Q	453.85	12 Q	414.55	11

== Equestrian ==
South Korea entered one dressage rider into the Olympic equestrian competition by virtue of a top national finish from Asia and Oceania at the FEI qualification event in Perl, Germany.

=== Dressage ===
Athlete	Horse	Event	Grand Prix		Grand Prix Special		Grand Prix Freestyle		Overall	
Athlete	Horse	Event	Score	Rank	Score	Rank	Technical	Artistic	Score	Rank
Kim Dong-seon	Bukowski	Individual	68.657	43	Did not advance					

== Fencing ==
South Korean fencers have qualified a full squad each in the men's and women's team épée and women's team sabre by virtue of being the highest ranking team from Asia outside the world's top four in the FIE Olympic Team Rankings.

London 2012 Olympians Gu Bon-gil, Kim Jung-hwan, and Jeon Hee-sook, along with 2008 Olympic silver medalist Nam Hyun-hee, had secured their individual spots in the men's sabre and women's foil, respectively, by finishing among the top 14 fencers in the FIE Adjusted Official Rankings. They were joined by four-time Asian men's foil champion Heo Jun as one of the two highest-ranked fencers from Asia outside the world's top eight qualified teams. Other fencers also featured London 2012 sabre champion Kim Ji-yeon and bronze medalist Jung Jin-sun in men's épée.

The fencing team was officially named to the South Korean roster for the Games on June 22, 2016.

Men

Athlete	Event	Round of 64	Round of 32	Round of 16	Quarterfinal	Semifinal	Final / BM	
Athlete	Event	Opposition Score	Opposition Score	Opposition Score	Opposition Score	Opposition Score	Opposition Score	Rank
Jung Jin-sun	Épée	Fernández (VEN); W 15–8	Garozzo (ITA); L 11–15	Did not advance				
Park Kyoung-doo	Épée	Bye	Novosjolov (EST); L 10–12	Did not advance				
Park Sang-young	Épée	Bye	Sukhov (RUS); W 15–11	Garozzo (ITA); W 15–12	Heinzer (SUI); W 15–4	Steffen (SUI); W 15–9	Imre (HUN); W 15–14	1st place, gold medalist(s)
Jung Jin-sun; Jung Seung-hwa; Park Kyoung-doo; Park Sang-young	Team épée	—N/a			Hungary; L 42–45	Classification semifinal Venezuela; W 45–40	5th place final Switzerland; W 45–36	5
Heo Jun	Foil	Bye	Cheung K L (HKG); L 8–15	Did not advance				
Gu Bon-gil	Sabre	—N/a	Amar (EGY); W 15–9	Abedini (IRI); L 12–15	Did not advance			
Kim Jung-hwan	Sabre	—N/a	Iriarte (CUB); W 15–7	Bazadze (GEO); W 15–14	Kovalev (RUS); W 15–10	Szilágyi (HUN); L 12–15	Abedini (IRI); W 15–12	3rd place, bronze medalist(s)

Women

Athlete	Event	Round of 64	Round of 32	Round of 16	Quarterfinal	Semifinal	Final / BM	
Athlete	Event	Opposition Score	Opposition Score	Opposition Score	Opposition Score	Opposition Score	Opposition Score	Rank
Choi In-jeong	Épée	Bye	Kolobova (RUS); W 15–12	Brânză (ROU); W 15–8	Fiamingo (ITA); L 8–15	Did not advance		
Kang Young-mi	Épée	Bye	Sun Yj (CHN); W 15–10	Szász (HUN); L 11–15	Did not advance			
Shin A-lam	Épée	Bye	Kryvytska (UKR); L 14–15	Did not advance				
Choi Eun-sook; Choi In-jeong; Kang Young-mi; Shin A-lam	Team épée	—N/a			Estonia; L 26–27	Classification semifinal Ukraine; W 45–34	5th place final United States; L 15–22	6
Jeon Hee-sook	Foil	Bye	Giménez (VEN); W 10–8	Shanaeva (RUS); L 11–15	Did not advance			
Nam Hyun-hee	Foil	Bye	Nishioka (JPN); L 12–15	Did not advance				
Hwang Seon-a	Sabre	Bye	Brunet (FRA); L 11–15	Did not advance				
Kim Ji-yeon	Sabre	Bye	Nguyễn T L D (VIE); W 15–3	Gulotta (ITA); L 13–15	Did not advance			
Seo Ji-yeon	Sabre	Bye	Dyachenko (RUS); L 12–15	Did not advance				
Hwang Seon-a; Kim Ji-yeon; Seo Ji-yeon; Yoon Ji-su	Team sabre	—N/a			Ukraine; L 40–45	Classification semifinal France; W 45–40	5th place final Poland; W 45–41	5

== Field hockey ==
Summary

Key:

- FT – After full time.
- P – Match decided by penalty-shootout.

Team	Event	Group Stage						Quarterfinal	Semifinal	Final / BM	
Team	Event	Opposition Score	Opposition Score	Opposition Score	Opposition Score	Opposition Score	Rank	Opposition Score	Opposition Score	Opposition Score	Rank
South Korea women's	Women's tournament	New Zealand; L 1–4	Netherlands; L 0–4	Germany; L 0–2	China; D 0–0	Spain; L 2–3	6	Did not advance			11

=== Women's tournament ===
South Korea women's field hockey team qualified for the Olympics by receiving a berth and earning the gold medal from the 2014 Asian Games in Incheon.

Team roster

The following is the South Korea roster in the women's field hockey tournament of the 2016 Summer Olympics.

Head coach: Han Jin-soo

1. Jang Soo-ji (GK)
4. Seo Jung-eun
7. Park Seung-a
8. An Hyo-ju
9. Han Hye-lyoung (C)
10. Park Mi-hyun
11. Kim Jong-eun
13. Cheon Eun-bi
16. Cho Hye-jin
18. Kim Bo-mi
20. Kim Hyun-ji
21. Hong Yoo-jin
22. Jang Hee-sun
23. Lee Young-sil
25. Park Ki-ju
26. Baek Ee-seul

Reserves:

- Jung Hea-bin (GK)
- Lee Yu-rim

Group play

Pos	Team	Pld	W	D	L	GF	GA	GD	Pts	Qualification
1	Netherlands	5	4	1	0	13	1	+12	13	Quarter-finals
2	New Zealand	5	3	1	1	11	5	+6	10	Quarter-finals
3	Germany	5	2	1	2	6	6	0	7	Quarter-finals
4	Spain	5	2	0	3	6	12	−6	6	Quarter-finals
5	China	5	1	2	2	3	5	−2	5	
6	South Korea	5	0	1	4	3	13	−10	1	

Source: Rio2016
Rules for classification: 1) Points; 2) Matches won; 3) Goal difference; 4) Goals for; 5) Head-to-head result.

7 August 2016
10:00

New Zealand	4–1	South Korea
Pearce 10'; Harrison 19'; Flynn 21'; Webster 34'	Report	Kim H. 55'

Umpires:
Fanneke Alkemade (NED)
Chieko Soma (JPN)

8 August 2016
17:00

Netherlands	4–0	South Korea
Jonker 9', 30', 42'; Dirkse van den Heuvel 46'	Report

Umpires:
Kelly Hudson (NZL)
Sarah Wilson (GBR)

10 August 2016
12:30

Germany	2–0	South Korea
Krüger 55'; Hahn 59'	Report

Umpires:
Michelle Joubert (RSA)
Kylie Seymour (AUS)

12 August 2016
10:00

South Korea	0–0	China
	Report

Umpires:
Irene Presenqui (ARG)
Soledad Iparraguirre (ARG)

13 August 2016
17:00

South Korea	2–3	Spain
Cheon 18'; Kim 55'	Report	Garcia 39'; Riera 41'; Comerma 48'

Umpires:
Michelle Meister (GER)
Fanneke Alkemade (NED)

== Football ==
=== Men's tournament ===
South Korea men's football team qualified for the Olympics by virtue of a top two finish at and by progressing to the gold medal match of the 2016 AFC U-23 Championship in Qatar.

Team roster

The following is the South Korea squad in the men's football tournament of the 2016 Summer Olympics. The team of 18 players was officially named on 29 June. On 17 July, Song Ju-hun left the squad due to injury and was replaced by Kim Min-tae.

Head coach: Shin Tae-yong

No.	Pos.	Player	Date of birth (age)	Caps	Goals	Club
1	GK	Kim Dong-jun	19 December 1994 (aged 21)	19	0	(Korea Football Association) Seongnam FC
2	DF	Sim Sang-min	21 May 1993 (aged 23)	27	0	(Korea Football Association) FC Seoul
3	DF	Lee Seul-chan	15 August 1993 (aged 22)	18	0	(Korea Football Association) Jeonnam Dragons
4	MF	Kim Min-tae	26 November 1993 (aged 22)	11	0	(Japan Football Association) Vegalta Sendai
5	DF	Choi Kyu-baek	23 January 1994 (aged 22)	5	1	(Korea Football Association) Jeonbuk Hyundai
6	DF	Jang Hyun-soo* (c)	28 September 1991 (aged 24)	16	3	(Chinese Football Association) Guangzhou R&F
7	FW	Son Heung-min*	8 July 1992 (aged 24)	0	0	(The Football Association) Tottenham Hotspur
8	MF	Moon Chang-jin	12 July 1993 (aged 23)	28	16	(Korea Football Association) Pohang Steelers
9	FW	Suk Hyun-jun*	29 June 1991 (aged 25)	2	0	(Portuguese Football Federation) FC Porto
10	MF	Ryu Seung-woo	17 December 1993 (aged 22)	22	4	(German Football Association) Bayer Leverkusen
11	FW	Hwang Hee-chan	26 January 1996 (aged 20)	12	1	(Austrian Football Association) Red Bull Salzburg
12	MF	Lee Chan-dong	10 January 1993 (aged 23)	11	1	(Korea Football Association) Gwangju FC
13	DF	Park Dong-jin	10 December 1994 (aged 21)	16	0	(Korea Football Association) Gwangju FC
14	MF	Park Yong-woo	10 September 1993 (aged 22)	15	2	(Korea Football Association) FC Seoul
15	DF	Jung Seung-hyun	3 April 1994 (aged 22)	17	2	(Korea Football Association) Ulsan Hyundai
16	MF	Kwon Chang-hoon	30 June 1994 (aged 22)	15	7	(Korea Football Association) Suwon Samsung Bluewings
17	MF	Lee Chang-min	20 January 1994 (aged 22)	22	4	(Korea Football Association) Jeju United
18	GK	Gu Sung-yun	27 June 1994 (aged 22)	12	0	(Japan Football Association) Consadole Sapporo

* Over-aged player.

Group play

Pos	Team	Pld	W	D	L	GF	GA	GD	Pts	Qualification
1	South Korea	3	2	1	0	12	3	+9	7	Quarter-finals
2	Germany	3	1	2	0	15	5	+10	5	Quarter-finals
3	Mexico	3	1	1	1	7	4	+3	4	
4	Fiji	3	0	0	3	1	23	−22	0	

Source: Rio2016 & FIFA
Rules for classification: Tiebreakers
4 August 2016
20:00

Fiji	0–8	South Korea
	Report (Rio2016); Report (FIFA)	Ryu Seung-woo 32', 63', 90+3'; Kwon Chang-hoon 62', 63'; Son Heung-min 72' (pen.); Suk Hyun-jun 77', 90'

Itaipava Arena Fonte Nova, Salvador
Attendance: 16,000
Referee: Malang Diedhiou (Senegal)

7 August 2016
16:00

Germany	3–3	South Korea
Gnabry 33', 90+2'; Selke 55'	Report (Rio2016); Report (FIFA)	Hwang Hee-chan 25'; Son Heung-min 57'; Suk Hyun-jun 87'

Itaipava Arena Fonte Nova, Salvador
Attendance: 17,121
Referee: Néstor Pitana (Argentina)

10 August 2016
16:00

South Korea	1–0	Mexico
Kwon Chang-hoon 73'	Report (Rio2016); Report (FIFA)

Estádio Nacional Mané Garrincha, Brasília
Attendance: 19,332
Referee: Clément Turpin (France)

Quarterfinal

13 August 2016
19:00

South Korea	0–1	Honduras
	Report (Rio2016); Report (FIFA)	Elis 59'

Mineirão, Belo Horizonte
Attendance: 36,704
Referee: Gehad Grisha (Egypt)

== Golf ==
South Korea entered six golfers (two men and four women) into the Olympic tournament. An Byeong-hun (world no. 31) and Wang Jeung-hun (world no. 76) qualified directly among the top 60 eligible players for the men's event, while top 15 seeds Park Inbee, Amy Yang, Kim Sei-young, and Chun In-gee did so for the women's based on the IGF World Rankings as of 11 July 2016.

Athlete	Event	Round 1	Round 2	Round 3	Round 4	Total		
Athlete	Event	Score	Score	Score	Score	Score	Par	Rank
An Byeong-hun	Men's	68	72	70	68	278	−6	=11
Wang Jeung-hun	Men's	70	72	77	67	286	+2	=43
Chun In-gee	Women's	70	66	72	71	279	−5	=13
Kim Sei-young	Women's	66	73	73	71	283	−1	=25
Park Inbee	Women's	66	66	70	66	268	−16	1st place, gold medalist(s)
Amy Yang	Women's	73	65	70	67	275	−9	=4

== Gymnastics ==
=== Artistic ===
South Korea fielded a full squad of five gymnasts in the men's artistic gymnastics events. The men's team qualified through a top eight finish at the 2015 World Artistic Gymnastics Championships in Glasgow. Meanwhile, an additional Olympic berth had been awarded to the South Korean female gymnast, who participated in the apparatus and all-around events at the Olympic Test Event in Rio de Janeiro. The men's artistic gymnastics team was named to the Olympic roster on June 22, 2016. Lee Go-im was selected to represent South Korea in the women's artistic gymnastics for the Games on June 12, 2016, with the men's squad joining her at the end of Olympic Team Trials on July 8. Before the start of the Games, Lee Go-im suffered an arm injury in training which forced her to withdraw. She was replaced by Lee Eun-ju.

Men
Team

Athlete	Event	Qualification								Final							
Athlete	Event	Apparatus						Total	Rank	Apparatus						Total	Rank
Athlete	Event	F	PH	R	V	PB	HB	Total	Rank	F	PH	R	V	PB	HB	Total	Rank
Kim Han-sol	Team	14.266	12.900	—N/a	12.633	—N/a	11.666	—N/a		Did not advance							
Lee Sang-wook	Team	14.333	14.033	13.500	—N/a	14.633	14.066	—N/a		Did not advance							
Park Min-soo	Team	13.400	13.600	14.400	14.033	15.033	14.800	85.266	27	Did not advance							
Shin Dong-hyen	Team	13.966	13.775	—N/a	15.100	13.800	—N/a			Did not advance							
Yoo Won-chul	Team	—N/a		14.733	14.333	14.441	14.600	—N/a		Did not advance							
Total	Team	42.565	41.408	42.633	43.466	44.107	43.466	247.645	11	Did not advance							

Women

Athlete	Event	Qualification						Final					
Athlete	Event	Apparatus				Total	Rank	Apparatus				Total	Rank
Athlete	Event	V	UB	BB	F	Total	Rank	V	UB	BB	F	Total	Rank
Lee Eun-ju	All-around	12.800	13.500	12.533	12.566	51.399	53	Did not advance					

=== Rhythmic ===
South Korea qualified one rhythmic gymnast for the individual all-around by finishing in the top 15 at the 2015 World Championships in Stuttgart, Germany.

Athlete	Event	Qualification						Final					
Athlete	Event	Hoop	Ball	Clubs	Ribbon	Total	Rank	Hoop	Ball	Clubs	Ribbon	Total	Rank
Son Yeon-jae	Individual	17.466	18.266	18.358	17.866	71.95	5 Q	18.216	18.266	18.300	18.116	72.898	4

== Handball ==
Summary

Key:

- ET – After extra time
- P – Match decided by penalty-shootout.

Team	Event	Group Stage						Quarterfinal	Semifinal	Final / BM	
Team	Event	Opposition Score	Opposition Score	Opposition Score	Opposition Score	Opposition Score	Rank	Opposition Score	Opposition Score	Opposition Score	Rank
South Korea women's	Women's tournament	Russia; L 25–30	Sweden; L 28–31	Netherlands; D 32–32	France; L 17–21	Argentina; W 28–22	5	Did not advance			10

=== Women's tournament ===
South Korea women's handball team qualified for the Olympics by winning the Asian Olympic Qualification Tournament in Nagoya, Japan.

Team roster

The following is the South Korean roster in the women's handball tournament of the 2016 Summer Olympics.

Head coach: Lim Young-chul

No.	Pos.	Name	Date of birth (age)	Height	App.	Goals	Club
1	GK	Oh Yong-ran	6 September 1972 (aged 43)	1.71 m	99	1	(South Korea) Incheon Sports Council
5	RW	Jung Yu-ra	6 February 1992 (aged 24)	1.70 m	59	317	(South Korea) Colorful Daegu
11	RB	Ryu Eun-hee	24 February 1990 (aged 26)	1.80 m	83	297	(South Korea) Incheon Sports Council
12	GK	Park Mi-ra	20 April 1987 (aged 29)	1.72 m	38	0	(South Korea) Wonderful Samcheok
13	P	Yoo Hyun-ji	16 July 1984 (aged 32)	1.75 m	89	111	(South Korea) Wonderful Samcheok
14	LB	Kim Jin-yi	20 June 1993 (aged 23)	1.81 m	50	115	(South Korea) Colorful Daegu
15	LW	Choi Su-min	9 January 1990 (aged 26)	1.77 m	49	115	(South Korea) Seoul City
17	LB	Sim Hae-in	31 October 1987 (aged 28)	1.78 m	64	117	(South Korea) Wonderful Samcheok
21	LW	Lee Eun-bi	23 October 1990 (aged 25)	1.63 m	79	166	(South Korea) BISCO
22	RW	Woo Sun-hee	1 July 1978 (aged 38)	1.72 m	119	380	(South Korea) Wonderful Samcheok
23	CB	Kim On-a	6 September 1988 (aged 27)	1.69 m	96	332	(South Korea) SK Sugar Gliders
24	CB	Gwon Han-na	22 November 1989 (aged 26)	1.72 m	82	103	(South Korea) Seoul City
27	P	Nam Yeong-sin	27 August 1990 (aged 25)	1.75 m	25	3	(South Korea) BISCO
29	RB	Yu So-jeong	4 June 1996 (aged 20)	1.68 m	19	71	(South Korea) SK Sugar Gliders

Group play

Pos	Team	Pld	W	D	L	GF	GA	GD	Pts	Qualification
1	Russia	5	5	0	0	165	147	+18	10	Quarter-finals
2	France	5	4	0	1	118	93	+25	8	Quarter-finals
3	Sweden	5	2	1	2	150	141	+9	5	Quarter-finals
4	Netherlands	5	1	2	2	135	135	0	4	Quarter-finals
5	South Korea	5	1	1	3	130	136	−6	3	
6	Argentina	5	0	0	5	101	147	−46	0	

Source: IHF
Rules for classification: 1) Points; 2) Head-to-head points; 3) Head-to-head goal difference; 4) Head-to-head goals scored; 5) Goal difference; 6) Goals scored; 7) Draw.

6 August 2016; 14:40	Russia	30–25	South Korea	Future Arena, Rio de Janeiro; Referees: Santos, Fonseca (POR)
6 August 2016; 14:40	Sudakova 6	(12–13)	Jung, Kim O. 6	Future Arena, Rio de Janeiro; Referees: Santos, Fonseca (POR)
6 August 2016; 14:40	3× (yellow card) 3× (suspension)	Report	4× (yellow card) 7× (suspension) 1× (red card)	Future Arena, Rio de Janeiro; Referees: Santos, Fonseca (POR)

8 August 2016; 09:30	South Korea	28–31	Sweden	Future Arena, Rio de Janeiro; Referees: Røen, Arntsen (NOR)
8 August 2016; 09:30	Woo 7	(15–16)	Hagman 7	Future Arena, Rio de Janeiro; Referees: Røen, Arntsen (NOR)
8 August 2016; 09:30	4× (yellow card) 3× (suspension)	Report	4× (yellow card) 5× (suspension)	Future Arena, Rio de Janeiro; Referees: Røen, Arntsen (NOR)

10 August 2016; 19:50	Netherlands	32–32	South Korea	Future Arena, Rio de Janeiro; Referees: Lopéz, Ramírez (ESP)
10 August 2016; 19:50	Broch, Groot 7	(18–17)	Gwon 11	Future Arena, Rio de Janeiro; Referees: Lopéz, Ramírez (ESP)
10 August 2016; 19:50	3× (yellow card) 5× (suspension)	Report	4× (yellow card) 3× (suspension)	Future Arena, Rio de Janeiro; Referees: Lopéz, Ramírez (ESP)

12 August 2016; 21:50	South Korea	17–21	France	Future Arena, Rio de Janeiro; Referees: Hansen, Gjeding (DEN)
12 August 2016; 21:50	Song 5	(11–11)	Lacrabère 7	Future Arena, Rio de Janeiro; Referees: Hansen, Gjeding (DEN)
12 August 2016; 21:50	1× (yellow card) 3× (suspension)	Report	4× (yellow card) 6× (suspension)	Future Arena, Rio de Janeiro; Referees: Hansen, Gjeding (DEN)

14 August 2016; 21:50	Argentina	22–28	South Korea	Future Arena, Rio de Janeiro; Referees: Bonaventura, Bonaventura (FRA)
14 August 2016; 21:50	Mendoza 6	(10–12)	Gwon 11	Future Arena, Rio de Janeiro; Referees: Bonaventura, Bonaventura (FRA)
14 August 2016; 21:50	3× (yellow card) 5× (suspension)	Report	3× (yellow card) 2× (suspension)	Future Arena, Rio de Janeiro; Referees: Bonaventura, Bonaventura (FRA)

== Judo ==
South Korea qualified a total of twelve judokas for each of the following weight classes at the Games. Eleven of them (seven men and four women) were ranked among the top 22 eligible judokas for men and top 14 for women in the IJF World Ranking List of May 30, 2016, while Bak Ji-yun at women's half-middleweight (63 kg) earned a continental quota spot from the Asian region as South Korea's top-ranked judoka outside of direct qualifying position.

Men

Athlete	Event	Round of 64	Round of 32	Round of 16	Quarterfinals	Semifinals	Repechage	Final / BM	
Athlete	Event	Opposition Result	Opposition Result	Opposition Result	Opposition Result	Opposition Result	Opposition Result	Opposition Result	Rank
Kim Won-jin	−60 kg	Bye	Manzi (ITA); W 001–000	Tsogtbaatar (MGL); W 010–001	Mudranov (RUS); L 000–100	Did not advance	Takato (JPN); L 000–001	Did not advance	7
An Ba-ul	−66 kg	Bye	Smagulov (KAZ); W 110–000	Le Blouch (FRA); W 110–000	Sobirov (UZB); W 010–000	Ebinuma (JPN); W 001–000	Bye	Basile (ITA); L 000–100	2nd place, silver medalist(s)
An Chang-rim	−73 kg	Bye	Kasem (SYR); W 110–000	van Tichelt (BEL); L 000–010	Did not advance				
Lee Seung-soo	−81 kg	Bye	Coughlan (AUS); W 100–000	Ivanov (BUL); L 000–010	Did not advance				
Gwak Dong-han	−90 kg	Bye	Briceño (CHI); W 100–000	Misenga (ROT); W 100–000	Mehdiyev (AZE); W 100–000	Liparteliani (GEO); L 000–100	Bye	Nyman (SWE); W 100–000	3rd place, bronze medalist(s)
Cho Gu-ham	−100 kg	Bye	M Pacek (SWE); W 000–000 S	Bloshenko (UKR); L 000–100	Did not advance				
Kim Sung-min	+100 kg	—N/a	Figueroa (ECU); W 102–000	Meyer (NED); L 000–101	Did not advance				

Women

Athlete	Event	Round of 32	Round of 16	Quarterfinals	Semifinals	Repechage	Final / BM	
Athlete	Event	Opposition Result	Opposition Result	Opposition Result	Opposition Result	Opposition Result	Opposition Result	Rank
Jeong Bo-kyeong	−48 kg	Bye	Vãn N T (VIE); W 010–000	Mönkhbat (MGL); W 100–000	Mestre (CUB); W 100–000	Bye	Pareto (ARG); L 000–010	2nd place, silver medalist(s)
Kim Jan-di	−57 kg	Bye	R Silva (BRA); L 000–010	Did not advance				
Bak Ji-yun	−63 kg	Schlesinger (GBR); L 000–100	Did not advance					
Kim Seong-yeon	−70 kg	Bye	Bolder (ISR); L 000–010	Did not advance				
Kim Min-jung	+78 kg	Bye	Altheman (BRA); W 001–000	Ortiz (CUB); L 000–101	Did not advance	Savelkouls (NED); W 102–000	Yu S (CHN); L 000–100	5

== Modern pentathlon ==
South Korea qualified a total of three modern pentathletes for the following events at the Games. Jun Woong-tae, Lee Dong-gi, and Kim Sun-woo finished among the top five in their respective events at the 2015 Asia & Oceania Championships. London 2012 Olympian Jung Jin-hwa became the third South Korean to qualify for the men's event in Rio, as a result of his world ranking as of May 31, 2016, resulting him and Jun Woong-tae (world no. 11) to be selected to the Olympic team over Lee Dong-gi, as the nation's top two modern pentathletes on the list.

Athlete	Event	Fencing (épée one touch)				Swimming (200 m freestyle)			Riding (show jumping)			Combined: shooting/running (10 m air pistol)/(3200 m)			Total points	Final rank
Athlete	Event	RR	BR	Rank	MP points	Time	Rank	MP points	Penalties	Rank	MP points	Time	Rank	MP Points	Total points	Final rank
Jun Woong-tae	Men's	13–22	0	32	178	2:00.88	8	338	28	25	272	11:02.50	1	638	1426	19
Jung Jin-hwa	Men's	17–18	1	23	203	2:00.82	6	338	17	17	283	11:21.80	12	619	1443	13
Kim Sun-woo	Women's	16–19	1	22	197	2:16.06	14	292	0	2	300	13:04.28	20	516	1305	14

== Rowing ==
South Korea qualified one boat each in the men's and women's single sculls for the Olympics at the 2016 Asia & Oceania Continental Qualification Regatta in Chungju.

Athlete	Event	Heats		Repechage		Quarterfinals		Semifinals		Final	
Athlete	Event	Time	Rank	Time	Rank	Time	Rank	Time	Rank	Time	Rank
Kim Dong-yong	Men's single sculls	7:20.85	4 R	7:12.96	1 QF	7:05.69	5 SC/D	7:20.10	3 FC	6:59.72	17
Kim Ye-ji	Women's single sculls	8:24.79	4 R	7:59.59	1 QF	7:51.80	5 SC/D	8:12.58	3 FC	7:52.68	18

Qualification Legend: FA=Final A (medal); FB=Final B (non-medal); FC=Final C (non-medal); FD=Final D (non-medal); FE=Final E (non-medal); FF=Final F (non-medal); SA/B=Semifinals A/B; SC/D=Semifinals C/D; SE/F=Semifinals E/F; QF=Quarterfinals; R=Repechage

== Sailing ==
South Korean sailors have qualified one boat in each of the following classes through the individual fleet World Championships and Asian qualifying regattas.

Athlete	Event	Race													Net points	Final rank
Athlete	Event	1	2	3	4	5	6	7	8	9	10	11	12	M*	Net points	Final rank
Lee Tae-hoon	Men's RS:X	14	20	3	9	18	7	~~33~~	17	27	14	22	14	EL	165	18
Ha Jee-min	Men's Laser	26	6	~~38~~	3	12	9	10	21	8	14	—N/a		EL	109	13
Kim Chang-ju; Kim Ji-hoon	Men's 470	5	~~25~~	5	8	20	13	21	23	24	20	—N/a		EL	146	19

M = Medal race; EL = Eliminated – did not advance into the medal race

== Shooting ==
South Korean shooters have achieved quota places for the following events by virtue of their best finishes at the 2014 and 2015 ISSF World Championships, the 2015 ISSF World Cup series, and Asian Championships, as long as they obtained a minimum qualifying score (MQS) by March 31, 2016. To assure their nomination to the Olympic team, shooters must compete at two separate legs of Olympic Trials: air gun (March 14 to 18) in Naju and small-bore (March 30 to April 10) in Daegu.

A total of 17 shooters (eight men and nine women) were selected to the South Korean roster, with Jin Jong-oh aiming to defend the Olympic title in the men's air pistol at his fourth straight Games. Among the shooters also featured London 2012 champion Kim Jang-mi (women's 25 m pistol) and silver medalist Kim Jong-hyun (men's 50 m rifle 3 positions).

With Jin Jong-oh securing quota places in both men's air and free pistol as a double starter, the South Korean team decided to exchange one of them with an additional spot in the women's 10 m air rifle instead based on performances throughout the qualifying period. The slot was awarded to Park Hae-mi.

Men

Athlete	Event	Qualification		Final	
Athlete	Event	Points	Rank	Points	Rank
Han Seung-woo	50 m pistol	562	3 Q	151.0	4
Jin Jong-oh	10 m air pistol	584	2 Q	139.8	5
Jin Jong-oh	50 m pistol	567	1 Q	193.7 OR	1st place, gold medalist(s)
Jung Ji-geun	10 m air rifle	616.7	43	Did not advance	
Kang Min-su	25 m rapid fire pistol	564	21	Did not advance	
Kim Hyeon-jun	10 m air rifle	624.4	11	Did not advance	
Kim Hyeon-jun	50 m rifle 3 positions	1165	32	Did not advance	
Kim Jong-hyun	50 m rifle prone	628.1	3 Q	208.2	2nd place, silver medalist(s)
Kim Jong-hyun	50 m rifle 3 positions	1170	16	Did not advance	
Kim Jun-hong	25 m rapid fire pistol	581	8	Did not advance	
Kwon Jun-cheol	50 m rifle prone	623.2	11	Did not advance	
Lee Dae-myung	10 m air pistol	577	19	Did not advance	

Women

Athlete	Event	Qualification		Semifinal		Final	
Athlete	Event	Points	Rank	Points	Rank	Points	Rank
Hwang Seong-eun	25 m pistol	577	18	Did not advance			
Jang Geum-young	50 m rifle 3 positions	568	35	—N/a		Did not advance	
Kim Eun-hye	10 m air rifle	410.8	36	—N/a		Did not advance	
Kim Jang-mi	25 m pistol	582	9	Did not advance			
Kim Min-jung	10 m air pistol	380	18	—N/a		Did not advance	
Kwak Jung-hye	10 m air pistol	380	15	—N/a		Did not advance	
Lee Kye-rim	50 m rifle 3 positions	570	32	—N/a		Did not advance	
Park Hae-mi	10 m air rifle	414.4	19	—N/a		Did not advance	

Qualification Legend: Q = Qualify for the next round; q = Qualify for the bronze medal (shotgun)

== Swimming ==
South Korean swimmers have so far achieved qualifying standards in the following events (up to a maximum of 2 swimmers in each event at the Olympic Qualifying Time (OQT), and potentially 1 at the Olympic Selection Time (OST)): To secure their nomination to the Olympic team, swimmers must attain a top two finish under the FINA Olympic qualifying A standard in each of the individual pool events at the Dong-A Swimming Competition (April 25 to 29) in Gwangju.

A total of eight swimmers (three men and five women) were selected to the South Korean roster for the Games at the end of the qualifying period, with Athens 2004 top eight finalist Nam Yoo-sun and four-time medalist Park Tae-hwan becoming the first to compete at their fourth Olympics. On July 8, 2016, the Korean Olympic Committee officially allowed Park to join the swimming team, following his appeal to the Court of Arbitration for Sport against a three-year suspension imposed by the committee for testing positive on banned testosterone.

Men

Athlete	Event	Heat		Semifinal		Final	
Athlete	Event	Time	Rank	Time	Rank	Time	Rank
Choi Kyu-woong	200 m breaststroke	2:13.36	24	Did not advance			
Park Tae-hwan	100 m freestyle	49.24	32	Did not advance			
Park Tae-hwan	200 m freestyle	1:48.06	29	Did not advance			
Park Tae-hwan	400 m freestyle	3:45.63	10	—N/a		Did not advance	
Park Tae-hwan	1500 m freestyle	DNS		—N/a		Did not advance	
Won Young-jun	100 m backstroke	55.05	30	Did not advance			

Women

Athlete	Event	Heat		Semifinal		Final	
Athlete	Event	Time	Rank	Time	Rank	Time	Rank
An Se-hyeon	100 m butterfly	57.80	10 Q	57.95	9	Did not advance	
An Se-hyeon	200 m butterfly	2:08.42	13 Q	2:08.69	13	Did not advance	
Back Su-yeon	200 m breaststroke	2:32.79	29	Did not advance			
Kim Seo-yeong	200 m individual medley	2:11.75	10 Q	2:12.15	=12	Did not advance	
Nam Yoo-sun	200 m individual medley	2:16.11	32	Did not advance			
Park Jin-young	200 m butterfly	2:09.99	21	Did not advance			

== Table tennis ==
South Korea fielded a team of six athletes into the table tennis competition at the Games. Jung Young-sik, Lee Sang-su, Jeon Ji-hee, and Seo Hyo-won were automatically selected among the top 22 eligible players each in their respective singles events based on the ITTF Olympic Rankings.

London 2012 silver medalist Joo Sae-hyuk and two-time Youth Olympic medalist Yang Ha-eun were each awarded the third spot to build the men's and women's teams for the Games by virtue of a top 10 national finish in the ITTF Olympic Rankings.

Men

Athlete	Event	Preliminary	Round 1	Round 2	Round 3	Round of 16	Quarterfinals	Semifinals	Final / BM	
Athlete	Event	Opposition Result	Opposition Result	Opposition Result	Opposition Result	Opposition Result	Opposition Result	Opposition Result	Opposition Result	Rank
Jung Young-sik	Singles	Bye			Pitchford (GBR); W 4–1	Ma L (CHN); L 2–4	Did not advance			
Lee Sang-su	Singles	Bye			Crișan (ROU); L 3–4	Did not advance				
Joo Sae-hyuk; Jung Young-sik; Lee Sang-su	Team	—N/a				Brazil; W 3–0	Sweden; W 3–1	China; L 0–3	Germany; L 1–3	4

Women

Athlete	Event	Round 1	Round 2	Round 3	Round 4	Round of 16	Quarterfinals	Semifinals	Final / BM	
Athlete	Event	Opposition Result	Opposition Result	Opposition Result	Opposition Result	Opposition Result	Opposition Result	Opposition Result	Opposition Result	Rank
Jeon Ji-hee	Singles	Bye			Ekholm (SWE); W 4–1	Yu My (SIN); L 1–4	Did not advance			
Seo Hyo-won	Singles	Bye			Zhang (USA); W 4–1	Cheng I-c (TPE); L 3–4	Did not advance			
Jeon Ji-hee; Seo Hyo-won; Yang Ha-eun	Team	—N/a				Romania; W 3–2	Singapore; L 2–3	Did not advance		

== Taekwondo ==
South Korea entered five athletes into the taekwondo competition at the Olympics. Three men, including 2008 Olympic champion Cha Dong-min, and 2012 Olympic silver medalist Lee Dae-hoon, and two women qualified automatically for their respective weight classes by finishing in the top 6 WTF Olympic rankings.

Athlete	Event	Round of 16	Quarterfinals	Semifinals	Repechage	Final / BM	
Athlete	Event	Opposition Result	Opposition Result	Opposition Result	Opposition Result	Opposition Result	Rank
Kim Tae-hun	Men's −58 kg	Hanprab (THA); L 10–12	Did not advance		Khalil (AUS); W 4–1	Navarro (MEX); W 7–5	3rd place, bronze medalist(s)
Lee Dae-hoon	Men's −68 kg	Boui (CAF); W 6–0	Abu-Ghaush (JOR); L 8–11	Did not advance	Zaki (EGY); W 14–6	Achab (BEL); W 11–7	3rd place, bronze medalist(s)
Cha Dong-min	Men's +80 kg	Silla (BLR); W DSQ	Isayev (AZE); L 8–12	Did not advance	Zhaparov (KAZ); W 5–2	Shokin (UZB); W 4–3 SUD	3rd place, bronze medalist(s)
Kim So-hui	Women's −49 kg	Diez (PER); W 10–2	Wongpattanakit (THA); W 6–5	Aziez (FRA); W 1–0 SUD	Bye	Bogdanović (SRB); W 7–6	1st place, gold medalist(s)
Oh Hye-ri	Women's −67 kg	Pagnotta (CAN); W 9–3	Chuang C-c (TPE); W 21–9 PTG	Azizova (AZE); W 6–5	Bye	Niaré (FRA); W 13–12	1st place, gold medalist(s)

== Volleyball ==
=== Indoor ===
==== Women's tournament ====
South Korea women's volleyball team qualified for the Olympics by virtue of a top three national finish at the first meet of the World Olympic Qualifying Tournament in Tokyo, Japan.

Team roster

The following is the South Korean roster in the women's volleyball tournament of the 2016 Summer Olympics.

Head coach: Lee Jung-chul

No.	Name	Date of birth	Height	Weight	Spike	Block	2015–16 club
3	Lee Hyo-hee (S)	9 September 1980	1.73 m (5 ft 8 in)	57 kg (126 lb)	280 cm (110 in)	271 cm (107 in)	(South Korea) Korea Expressway Corp.
4	Kim Hee-jin (OP)	29 April 1991	1.85 m (6 ft 1 in)	75 kg (165 lb)	300 cm (120 in)	295 cm (116 in)	(South Korea) IBK Altos
5	Kim Hae-ran (L)	16 March 1984	1.68 m (5 ft 6 in)	57 kg (126 lb)	280 cm (110 in)	270 cm (110 in)	(South Korea) Korea Ginseng Corp.
6	Hwang Youn-joo (OP)	13 August 1986	1.77 m (5 ft 10 in)	64 kg (141 lb)	285 cm (112 in)	265 cm (104 in)	(South Korea) Hyundai E&C
7	Lee Jae-yeong (OH)	15 October 1996	1.79 m (5 ft 10 in)	63 kg (139 lb)	286 cm (113 in)	267 cm (105 in)	(South Korea) Heungkuk Life Insurance
8	Nam Jie-youn (OH)	15 May 1983	1.70 m (5 ft 7 in)	61 kg (134 lb)	285 cm (112 in)	273 cm (107 in)	(South Korea) IBK Altos
10	Kim Yeon-koung (c) (OH)	26 February 1988	1.92 m (6 ft 4 in)	73 kg (161 lb)	350 cm (140 in)	340 cm (130 in)	(Turkey) Fenerbahçe
11	Kim Su-ji (MB)	11 July 1987	1.86 m (6 ft 1 in)	68 kg (150 lb)	335 cm (132 in)	320 cm (130 in)	(South Korea) Heungkuk Life Insurance
13	Park Jeong-ah (OH)	26 March 1993	1.87 m (6 ft 2 in)	73 kg (161 lb)	300 cm (120 in)	290 cm (110 in)	(South Korea) IBK Altos
14	Yang Hyo-jin (MB)	14 December 1989	1.90 m (6 ft 3 in)	72 kg (159 lb)	340 cm (130 in)	338 cm (133 in)	(South Korea) Hyundai E&C
16	Bae Yoo-na (MB/OP)	30 November 1989	1.82 m (6 ft 0 in)	66 kg (146 lb)	288 cm (113 in)	280 cm (110 in)	(South Korea) Korea Expressway Corp.
17	Yeum Hye-seon (S)	3 February 1991	1.77 m (5 ft 10 in)	65 kg (143 lb)	278 cm (109 in)	263 cm (104 in)	(South Korea) Hyundai E&C

Group play

Pos	Team	Pld	W	L	Pts	SW	SL	SR	SPW	SPL	SPR	Qualification
1	Brazil (H)	5	5	0	15	15	0	MAX	377	272	1.386	Quarter-finals
2	Russia	5	4	1	12	12	4	3.000	393	323	1.217	Quarter-finals
3	South Korea	5	3	2	9	10	7	1.429	384	372	1.032	Quarter-finals
4	Japan	5	2	3	6	7	9	0.778	347	364	0.953	Quarter-finals
5	Argentina	5	1	4	2	3	14	0.214	319	407	0.784	
6	Cameroon	5	0	5	1	2	15	0.133	328	410	0.800	

Source: FIVB
Rules for classification: Tiebreakers
(H) Host

6 August 2016; 09:30	Japan	1–3	South Korea	Ginásio do Maracanãzinho, Rio de Janeiro; Attendance: 5,760; Referees: Denny Cespedes (DOM), Patricia Rolf (USA)
6 August 2016; 09:30	(25–19, 15–25, 17–25, 21–25); Result Statistics			Ginásio do Maracanãzinho, Rio de Janeiro; Attendance: 5,760; Referees: Denny Cespedes (DOM), Patricia Rolf (USA)

8 August 2016; 20:30	Russia	3–1	South Korea	Ginásio do Maracanãzinho, Rio de Janeiro; Attendance: 5,398; Referees: Piotr Dudek (POL), Ibrahim Al-Naama (QAT)
8 August 2016; 20:30	(25–23, 23–25, 25–23, 25–14); Result Statistics			Ginásio do Maracanãzinho, Rio de Janeiro; Attendance: 5,398; Referees: Piotr Dudek (POL), Ibrahim Al-Naama (QAT)

10 August 2016; 20:30	South Korea	3–0	Argentina	Ginásio do Maracanãzinho, Rio de Janeiro; Attendance: 7,248; Referees: Patricia Rolf (USA), Taoufik Boudaya (TUN)
10 August 2016; 20:30	(25–18, 25–20, 25–23); Result Statistics			Ginásio do Maracanãzinho, Rio de Janeiro; Attendance: 7,248; Referees: Patricia Rolf (USA), Taoufik Boudaya (TUN)

12 August 2016; 22:35	Brazil	3–0	South Korea	Ginásio do Maracanãzinho, Rio de Janeiro; Attendance: 8,790; Referees: Patricia Rolf (USA), Liu Jiang (CHN)
12 August 2016; 22:35	(25–17, 25–13, 27–25); Result Statistics			Ginásio do Maracanãzinho, Rio de Janeiro; Attendance: 8,790; Referees: Patricia Rolf (USA), Liu Jiang (CHN)

14 August 2016; 11:35	South Korea	3–0	Cameroon	Ginásio do Maracanãzinho, Rio de Janeiro; Attendance: 6,893; Referees: Luis Macias (MEX), Rogerio Espicalsky (BRA)
14 August 2016; 11:35	(25–15, 25–22, 25–20); Result Statistics			Ginásio do Maracanãzinho, Rio de Janeiro; Attendance: 6,893; Referees: Luis Macias (MEX), Rogerio Espicalsky (BRA)

Quarterfinal

16 August 2016; 10:00	South Korea	1–3	Netherlands	Ginásio do Maracanãzinho, Rio de Janeiro; Attendance: 6,351; Referees: Patricia Rolf (USA), Nasr Shaaban (EGY)
16 August 2016; 10:00	(19–25, 14–25, 25–23, 20–25); Result Statistics			Ginásio do Maracanãzinho, Rio de Janeiro; Attendance: 6,351; Referees: Patricia Rolf (USA), Nasr Shaaban (EGY)

== Weightlifting ==
South Korean weightlifters have qualified four men's and three women's quota places for the Rio Olympics based on their combined team standing by points at the 2014 and 2015 IWF World Championships. The team must allocate these places to individual athletes by June 20, 2016.

The full weightlifting team was announced on July 4, 2016, with London 2012 Olympian Won Jeong-sik and Beijing 2008 silver medalist Yoon Jin-hee leading the athletes for their second Olympic appearance.

Men

Athlete	Event	Snatch		Clean & Jerk		Total	Rank
Athlete	Event	Result	Rank	Result	Rank	Total	Rank
Han Myeong-mok	−62 kg	130	6	150	10	280	9
Won Jeong-sik	−69 kg	143	9	177	9	320	9
Yu Dong-ju	−85 kg	150	=12	190	=12	340	14
Park Han-woong	−94 kg	165	10	202	10	367	10

Women

Athlete	Event	Snatch		Clean & Jerk		Total	Rank
Athlete	Event	Result	Rank	Result	Rank	Total	Rank
Yoon Jin-hee	−53 kg	88	5	111	3	199	3rd place, bronze medalist(s)
Lee Hui-sol	+75 kg	122	4	153	6	275	5
Son Young-hee	+75 kg	118	8	155	5	273	6

== Wrestling ==
South Korea qualified a total of five wrestlers for each of the following weight classes into the Olympic competition. One of them finished among the top six to book an Olympic spot in the men's Greco-Roman 66 kg at the 2015 World Championships, while two more Olympic places were awarded to South Korean wrestlers, who progressed to the top two finals at the 2016 Asian Qualification Tournament.

Two further wrestlers had claimed the remaining Olympic slots to round out the South Korean roster in separate Olympic Qualification Tournaments; one of them in men's Greco-Roman 59 kg at the initial meet in Ulaanbaatar and the other in men's freestyle 86 kg at the final meet in Istanbul.

Key:

- VT – Victory by fall.
- PP – Decision by points – the loser with technical points.
- PO – Decision by points – the loser without technical points.
- ST – Great superiority – the loser without technical points and a margin of victory of at least 8 (Greco-Roman) or 10 (freestyle) points.
- SP – Technical superiority – the loser with technical points and a margin of victory of at least 8 (Greco-Roman) or 10 (freestyle) points.

Men's freestyle

Athlete	Event	Qualification	Round of 16	Quarterfinal	Semifinal	Repechage 1	Repechage 2	Final / BM	
Athlete	Event	Opposition Result	Opposition Result	Opposition Result	Opposition Result	Opposition Result	Opposition Result	Opposition Result	Rank
Yun Jun-sik	−57 kg	Bye	Aliyev (AZE); L 1–4 ^{SP}	Did not advance					17
Kim Gwan-uk	−86 kg	Bye	Salas (CUB); L 0–5 ^{VT}	Did not advance					16

Men's Greco-Roman

Athlete	Event	Qualification	Round of 16	Quarterfinal	Semifinal	Repechage 1	Repechage 2	Final / BM	
Athlete	Event	Opposition Result	Opposition Result	Opposition Result	Opposition Result	Opposition Result	Opposition Result	Opposition Result	Rank
Lee Jung-baik	−59 kg	Berge (NOR); L 0–3 ^{PO}	Did not advance						14
Ryu Han-su	−66 kg	Bye	T Lőrincz (HUN); W 3–0 ^{PO}	Arutyunyan (ARM); L 1–3 ^{PP}	Did not advance	Bye	Saleh (EGY); W 3–0 ^{PO}	Chunayev (AZE); L 0–4 ^{ST}	5
Kim Hyeon-woo	−75 kg	Bye	Vlasov (RUS); L 1–3 ^{PP}	Did not advance		Bye	Yang B (CHN); W 3–1 ^{PP}	Starčević (CRO); W 3–1 ^{PP}	3rd place, bronze medalist(s)

== See also ==
- South Korea at the 2016 Summer Paralympics
