= 2016 Asian Taekwondo Olympic Qualification Tournament =

Taekwondo competition

- Venue: Marriot Convention Center Grand Ballroom
- Location: Pasay, Philippines
- Dates: 16−17 April 2016

The 2016 Asian Qualification Tournament for Rio Olympic Games was held from April 16 to 17, 2016 at the Marriot Convention Center Grand Ballroom in Pasay, Metro Manila, Philippines. The top two athletes from each weight division qualified for the Olympics. 98 athletes from 36 Asian countries entered the qualification tournament.

4 million pesos approved budget by the Philippine Sports Commission was spent by the Philippine Taekwando Association for the hosting rights and event preparations.

== Qualification summary ==
NOC	Men				Women				Total
NOC	−58kg	−68kg	−80kg	+80kg	−49kg	−57kg	−67kg	+67kg	Total
Cambodia								X	1
China	X			X					2
Chinese Taipei			X		X				2
Iran						X			1
Jordan		X							1
Kazakhstan				X	X		X		3
Mongolia		X							1
Philippines								X	1
Thailand	X					X			2
Uzbekistan			X				X		2
Total: 10 NOCs	2	2	2	2	2	2	2	2	16

== Men ==
=== −58 kg ===
17 April

Round of 32
Alfonso Dias Miqueias (TLS)	1–2	Rozaimi Rozali (MAS)
Hamad Al-Mabrouk (KSA)	11–5	Doten Dorji (BHU)
Marat Niyazov (KGZ)	9–1	Hesham Al-Hashimi (BRN)
Ranjan Shrestha (NEP)	1–9	Thipphakone Kuangmany (LAO)

Round of 16
Nursultan Mamayev (KAZ)	7
Rozaimi Rozali (MAS)	6
Mahmood Haidari (AFG)	0
Tawin Hanprab (THA)	7
Reinaldy Atmanegara (INA)	7
Yahya Ayash (YEM)	10
Hamad Al-Mabrouk (KSA)	6
Nguyễn Văn Duy (VIE)	5
Malik Abu Al-Rob (PLE)
Marat Niyazov (KGZ)	WD
Ng Ming Wei (SGP)	4
Sergio Suzuki (JPN)	7
Molomyn Tümenbayar (MGL)	19
Adil Al-Wahaibi (OMA)	0
Thipphakone Kuangmany (LAO)	0
Zhao Shuai (CHN)	12

Quarterfinals
Nursultan Mamayev (KAZ)	5
Tawin Hanprab (THA)	8
Yahya Ayash (YEM)	8
Hamad Al-Mabrouk (KSA)	6
Marat Niyazov (KGZ)	1
Sergio Suzuki (JPN)	2
Molomyn Tümenbayar (MGL)	1
Zhao Shuai (CHN)	9

Semifinals
Tawin Hanprab (THA)	14
Yahya Ayash (YEM)	2
Sergio Suzuki (JPN)	3
Zhao Shuai (CHN)	4

Final
Tawin Hanprab (THA)
Zhao Shuai (CHN)	WD

=== −68 kg ===
17 April

Round of 32
Raja Zulfadli (SGP)	6–4	Hasanein Khafaji (IRQ)
Peerathep Sila-on (THA)	22–3	Zaw Zaw (MYA)
Ryo Yamada (JPN)	11–9	Mohammad Ghanem (SYR)
Claudio Mousaco (TLS)	1–13	Bir Bahadur Mahara (NEP)
Michel Samaha (LBN)	2–4	Chang Cheng-hao (TPE)

Round of 16
Ahmad Abughaush (JOR)	13
Raja Zulfadli (SGP)	7
Abdulla Al-Ahmed (BRN)	13
Dinggo Ardian Prayogo (INA)	7
Phan Trung Đức (VIE)	2
Peerathep Sila-on (THA)	10
Ryo Yamada (JPN)	10
Ghazi Al-Asmari (KSA)	11
Pürevjavyn Temüüjin (MGL)	19
Bir Bahadur Mahara (NEP)	3
Ali Al-Hashmi (OMA)	2
Rohullah Nikpai (AFG)	10
Somsanouk Phommavanh (LAO)	9
Yeung Tsz Wing (HKG)	8
Chang Cheng-hao (TPE)	8
Faisal Al-Rushaidi (QAT)	5

Quarterfinals
Ahmad Abughaush (JOR)	13
Abdulla Al-Ahmed (BRN)	2
Peerathep Sila-on (THA)	14
Ghazi Al-Asmari (KSA)	0
Pürevjavyn Temüüjin (MGL)	PUN
Rohullah Nikpai (AFG)
Somsanouk Phommavanh (LAO)	1
Chang Cheng-hao (TPE)	11

Semifinals
Ahmad Abughaush (JOR)	15
Peerathep Sila-on (THA)	2
Pürevjavyn Temüüjin (MGL)	12
Chang Cheng-hao (TPE)	7

Final
Ahmad Abughaush (JOR)	14
Pürevjavyn Temüüjin (MGL)	2

=== −80 kg ===
16 April

Round of 16
Navjeet Maan (IND)	6
Akbar Aitakhunov (KGZ)	4
Muhammad Faheem (PAK)
Samuel Morrison (PHI)	RSC

Quarterfinals
Nikita Rafalovich (UZB)	13
Navjeet Maan (IND)	5
Farkhod Negmatov (TJK)	2
Anas Al-Adarbi (JOR)	6
Mahmoud Abdelrahim (QAT)	5
Leung Nam Cheuk (HKG)	4
Samuel Morrison (PHI)	7
Liu Wei-ting (TPE)	9

Semifinals
Nikita Rafalovich (UZB)	5
Anas Al-Adarbi (JOR)	4
Mahmoud Abdelrahim (QAT)	2
Liu Wei-ting (TPE)	4

Final
Nikita Rafalovich (UZB)	1
Liu Wei-ting (TPE)	0

=== +80 kg ===
16 April

Round of 16
Bahri Tanrıkulu (PLE)	7
Kristopher Uy (PHI)	3

Quarterfinals
Ruslan Zhaparov (KAZ)	10
Bahri Tanrıkulu (PLE)	6
Atief Arshad (PAK)	3
Anand Pandiarajan (IND)	0
Elias El-Hidari (LBN)	4
Qiao Sen (CHN)	9
Nezar Bckdash (SYR)	3
Alisher Gulov (TJK)	12

Semifinals
Ruslan Zhaparov (KAZ)	3
Atief Arshad (PAK)	1
Qiao Sen (CHN)	9
Alisher Gulov (TJK)	2

Final
Ruslan Zhaparov (KAZ)	0
Qiao Sen (CHN)	2

== Women ==
=== −49 kg ===
16 April

Round of 16
Zariya Kosimova (UZB)	7
Nur Dhia Liyana (MAS)	4
Ainur Yesbergenova (KAZ)	10
Nur Fadzlyn Zahruddin (SGP)	1
Yasmeen Maryam Khan (PAK)	1
Luisa Rosa (TLS)	4
Mariska Halinda (INA)	3
Latika Bhandari (IND)	2
Farzona Radzhabova (TJK)	1
Bana Daraghmi (JOR)	8
Yuna Matsui (JPN)	2
Huang Huai-hsuan (TPE)	3
Somaeh Gholami (AFG)	2
Lam Siu Wai (HKG)	1

Quarterfinals
Trương Thị Kim Tuyền (VIE)	4
Zariya Kosimova (UZB)	3
Ainur Yesbergenova (KAZ)	9
Luisa Rosa (TLS)	2
Mariska Halinda (INA)	2
Bana Daraghmi (JOR)	3
Huang Huai-hsuan (TPE)	3
Somaeh Gholami (AFG)	0

Semifinals
Trương Thị Kim Tuyền (VIE)	7
Ainur Yesbergenova (KAZ)	13
Bana Daraghmi (JOR)	0
Huang Huai-hsuan (TPE)	4

Final
Ainur Yesbergenova (KAZ)	1
Huang Huai-hsuan (TPE)	3

=== −57 kg ===
17 April

Round of 16
Nila Ahmadi (AFG)	4
Shaleha Fitriana Yusuf (INA)	15

Quarterfinals
Kimia Alizadeh (IRI)	19
Shaleha Fitriana Yusuf (INA)	0
Neema Gurung (NEP)	4
Sabra Al-Salti (OMA)	1
Phannapa Harnsujin (THA)	14
Chhoeung Puthearim (CAM)	0
Nurul Farah Alisa (MAS)	2
Pauline Lopez (PHI)	4

Semifinals
Kimia Alizadeh (IRI)	15
Neema Gurung (NEP)	2
Phannapa Harnsujin (THA)	5
Pauline Lopez (PHI)	2

Final
Kimia Alizadeh (IRI)	3
Phannapa Harnsujin (THA)	2

=== −67 kg ===
17 April

Quarterfinals		Semifinals		Final
Julyana Al-Sadeq (JOR)	WD
Fajar Al-Binali (BRN)		Julyana Al-Sadeq (JOR)	0
Chan Hok Ming (HKG)	0	Nigora Tursunkulova (UZB)	2
Nigora Tursunkulova (UZB)	7			Nigora Tursunkulova (UZB)	1
Cansel Deniz (KAZ)	19			Cansel Deniz (KAZ)	4
Najia Rasool (PAK)	0	Cansel Deniz (KAZ)	1
Gaganjot Gill (IND)	0	Hà Thị Nguyên (VIE)	0
Hà Thị Nguyên (VIE)	7

=== +67 kg ===
16 April

Quarterfinals		Semifinals		Final
		Akram Khodabandeh (IRI)	3
Kirstie Alora (PHI)	9	Kirstie Alora (PHI)	10
Nisha Rawal (NEP)	0			Kirstie Alora (PHI)	0
				Sorn Seavmey (CAM)	5
		Sorn Seavmey (CAM)	2
		Mokhru Khalimova (TJK)	1

== See also ==
- 2016 Asian Taekwondo Championships
