= Thailand at the 2016 Summer Olympics =

- IOC code: THA
- NOC: National Olympic Committee of Thailand
- Website: www.olympicthai.or.th (in Thai and English)

in Rio de Janeiro
- Competitors: 54 in 15 sports
- Flag bearers: Ratchanok Intanon (opening); Boonthung Srisung (closing)
- Medals Ranked 35th: Gold 2 Silver 2 Bronze 2 Total 6

Summer Olympics appearances (overview)
- 1952; 1956; 1960; 1964; 1968; 1972; 1976; 1980; 1984; 1988; 1992; 1996; 2000; 2004; 2008; 2012; 2016; 2020; 2024

Thailand competed at the 2016 Summer Olympics in Rio de Janeiro, Brazil, from 5 to 21 August 2016. Since the nation's official debut in 1952, Thai athletes had appeared in every edition of the Summer Olympic Games, with the exception of the 1980 Summer Olympics in Moscow, because of its support of the US-led boycott.

The National Olympic Committee of Thailand fielded a team of 54 athletes, 26 men and 28 women, to compete in fifteen sports at the Games. It was the nation's joint-largest ever delegation sent to the Olympics, alongside the team sent to the Tokyo Games in 1964. Thailand made its Olympic debut in women's boxing, BMX cycling, golf, and men's table tennis. Moreover, it registered more female athletes than males for only the second time in history.

Fourteen athletes on the Thai roster competed at London 2012, including badminton star Boonsak Ponsana (men's singles) and table tennis player Nanthana Komwong, both of whom made their historic fifth Olympic appearance as the most experienced competitors on the team. Apart from the veterans, four more Thai athletes made their third Olympic appearance, namely welterweight boxer Sailom Adi, freestyle swimmer Natthanan Junkrajang, pistol shooter Tanyaporn Prucksakorn, and world's top-ranked skeet shooter Sutiya Jiewchaloemmit. Other notable Thai athletes included professional golfer Ariya Jutanugarn, who became the first Thai golfer capture the major championship title, and world's top four badminton player Ratchanok Intanon (women's singles), who was named as the country's first female flag bearer for the opening ceremony.

Thailand left Rio de Janeiro with a total of six medals (two for each color), its most successful Olympics since 2004. Four of these medals were awarded to the team in weightlifting, including two golds won by Sopita Tanasan (women's 48 kg) and Sukanya Srisurat (women's 58 kg), and two others in taekwondo. For the first time in four decades, Thailand failed to pick up a single medal in boxing, as neither of its fighters progressed beyond the quarterfinal round.

== Medalists ==
Medal	Name	Sport	Event	Date
Gold	Sopita Tanasan	Weightlifting	Women's 48 kg	6 August
Gold	Sukanya Srisurat	Weightlifting	Women's 58 kg	8 August
Silver	Pimsiri Sirikaew	Weightlifting	Women's 58 kg	8 August
Silver	Tawin Hanprab	Taekwondo	Men's 58 kg	17 August
Bronze	Sinphet Kruaithong	Weightlifting	Men's 56 kg	7 August
Bronze	Panipak Wongpattanakit	Taekwondo	Women's 49 kg	17 August

Medals by sport
Sport	1st place, gold medalist(s)	2nd place, silver medalist(s)	3rd place, bronze medalist(s)	Total
Weightlifting	2	1	1	4
Taekwondo	0	1	1	2
Total	2	2	2	6

== Competitors ==
Sport	Men	Women	Total
Archery	1	0	1
Athletics	1	3	4
Badminton	2	5	7
Boxing	4	1	5
Cycling	0	2	2
Golf	2	2	4
Judo	1	0	1
Rowing	1	1	2
Sailing	2	2	4
Shooting	2	3	5
Swimming	1	1	2
Table tennis	1	2	3
Taekwondo	1	2	3
Tennis	2	0	2
Weightlifting	5	4	9
Total	26	28	54

== Archery ==
One Thai archer qualified for the men's individual recurve at the Olympics by virtue of a top five national finish at the 2016 Archery World Cup meet in Antalya, Turkey.

Athlete	Event	Ranking round		Round of 64	Round of 32	Round of 16	Quarterfinals	Semifinals	Final / BM	
Athlete	Event	Score	Seed	Opposition Score	Opposition Score	Opposition Score	Opposition Score	Opposition Score	Opposition Score	Rank
Witthaya Thamwong	Men's individual	655	41	Jantsan (MGL); W 7–3	Wei C-h (TPE); W 6–5	Valladont (FRA); L 0–6	Did not advance			

== Athletics ==
Thai athletes have so far achieved qualifying standards in the following athletics events (up to a maximum of 3 athletes in each event):

Key

- Note–Ranks given for track events are within the athlete's heat only
- Q = Qualified for the next round
- q = Qualified for the next round as a fastest loser or, in field events, by position without achieving the qualifying target
- NR = National record
- N/A = Round not applicable for the event
- Bye = Athlete not required to compete in round

Track & road events

Athlete	Event	Final	
Athlete	Event	Result	Rank
Boonthung Srisung	Men's marathon	2:37:46	133
Natthaya Thanaronnawat	Women's marathon	3:11:31	130
Jane Vongvorachoti	Women's marathon	2:47:27	91

Field events

Athlete	Event	Qualification		Final	
Athlete	Event	Distance	Position	Distance	Position
Subenrat Insaeng	Women's discus throw	56.64	24	Did not advance	

== Badminton ==
Thailand has qualified a total of seven badminton players for each of the following events into the Olympic tournament based on the BWF World Rankings as of 5 May 2016: two entries in the women's singles, one in the men's singles, and a pair each in the women's and mixed doubles.

Men

Athlete	Event	Group Stage			Elimination	Quarterfinal	Semifinal	Final / BM	
Athlete	Event	Opposition Score	Opposition Score	Rank	Opposition Score	Opposition Score	Opposition Score	Opposition Score	Rank
Boonsak Ponsana	Singles	Axelsen (DEN); L (14–21, 13–21)	Lee D-k (KOR); W (21–19, 17–21, 21−16)	2	Did not advance				

Women

Athlete	Event	Group Stage				Elimination	Quarterfinal	Semifinal	Final / BM	
Athlete	Event	Opposition Score	Opposition Score	Opposition Score	Rank	Opposition Score	Opposition Score	Opposition Score	Opposition Score	Rank
Porntip Buranaprasertsuk	Singles	Chen H-y (AUS); W (21–14, 21–15)	Foo Kune (MRI); W (21–7, 21–18)	—N/a	1 Q	Ulitina (UKR); W (21–14, 21–16)	Li Xr (CHN); L (12–21, 17–21)	Did not advance		
Ratchanok Intanon	Singles	Tolmoff (EST); W (21–14, 21–13)	Yip P Y (HKG); W (21–18, 21–12)	—N/a	1 Q	Yamaguchi (JPN); L (19–21, 16–21)	Did not advance			
Puttita Supajirakul; Sapsiree Taerattanachai	Doubles	Muskens / Piek (NED); L (13–21, 20–22)	Matsutomo / Takahashi (JPN); L (15–21, 15–21)	Gutta / Ponnappa (IND); W (21–17, 21–15)	3	—N/a	Did not advance			

Mixed

Athlete	Event	Group Stage				Quarterfinal	Semifinal	Final / BM	
Athlete	Event	Opposition Score	Opposition Score	Opposition Score	Rank	Opposition Score	Opposition Score	Opposition Score	Rank
Bodin Isara; Savitree Amitrapai	Doubles	Chan P S / Goh L Y (MAS); L (13–21, 19–21)	Ahmad / Natsir (INA); L (11–21, 13–21)	Middleton / Choo (AUS); W (21–13, 21–18)	3	Did not advance			

== Boxing ==
Thailand has entered four boxers to compete in the Olympic boxing tournament. Wuttichai Masuk became the first Thai boxer to be selected to the Olympic team, following his box-off victory at the 2015 World Championships. Meanwhile, 2012 Olympians Chatchai Butdee and Sailom Adi had claimed their Olympic spots at the 2016 Asia & Oceania Qualification Tournament in Qian'an, China.

Peamwilai Laopeam was the only Thai woman to book an Olympic spot, with a quarterfinal victory at the World Championships in Astana, Kazakhstan. Lightweight boxer Amnat Ruenroeng rounded out the Thai roster by his performance at the 2016 APB and WSB Olympic Qualifier in Vargas, Venezuela.

Athlete	Event	Round of 32	Round of 16	Quarterfinals	Semifinals	Final	
Athlete	Event	Opposition Result	Opposition Result	Opposition Result	Opposition Result	Opposition Result	Rank
Chatchai Butdee	Men's bantamweight	Ashfaq (GBR); W 3–0	Nikitin (RUS); L 1-2	Did not advance			
Amnat Ruenroeng	Men's lightweight	Perrin (ARG); W 3–0	Oumiha (FRA); L TKO	Did not advance			
Wuttichai Masuk	Men's light welterweight	Bye	Russell (USA); L 1–2	Did not advance			
Sailom Adi	Men's welterweight	Kastramin (BLR); W 2–1	Chamov (BUL); W 3–0	Cissokho (FRA); L 0–3	Did not advance		
Peamwilai Laopeam	Women's flyweight	—N/a	Bye	Valencia (COL); L 0–3	Did not advance		

== Cycling ==
=== Road ===
Thailand has qualified one rider in the women's Olympic road race by virtue of a top 100 individual placement in the 2016 UCI World Rankings.

Athlete	Event	Time	Rank
Jutatip Maneephan	Women's road race	Did not finish	

=== BMX ===
Thailand received an invitation from the UCI to send a women's BMX rider to the Olympics, as the next highest-ranked eligible nation, not yet qualified, in the UCI Olympic Ranking List of May 31, 2016. BMX rider and Asian Games champion Amanda Carr was named to the Thai team on June 1, 2016.

Athlete	Event	Seeding		Semifinal		Final	
Athlete	Event	Result	Rank	Points	Rank	Result	Rank
Amanda Carr	Women's BMX	36.464	13	18	6	Did not advance	

== Golf ==
Thailand has entered four golfers (two per gender) into the Olympic tournament. Kiradech Aphibarnrat (world no. 53), Thongchai Jaidee (world no. 38), Ariya Jutanugarn (world no. 7) and Pornanong Phatlum (world no. 34) qualified directly among the top 60 eligible players for their respective individual events based on the IGF World Rankings as of 11 July 2016.

Athlete	Event	Round 1	Round 2	Round 3	Round 4	Total		
Athlete	Event	Score	Score	Score	Score	Score	Par	Rank
Kiradech Aphibarnrat	Men's	71	69	69	67	276	−8	=5
Thongchai Jaidee	Men's	70	75	67	67	279	−5	=15
Ariya Jutanugarn	Women's	65	71	WD	WD	136	−6	DNF
Pornanong Phatlum	Women's	71	72	69	71	283	−1	=25

== Judo ==
Thailand has qualified one judoka for the men's heavyweight category (+100 kg) at the Games. Kunathip Yea-on earned a continental quota spot from the Asian region, as the highest-ranked Thai judoka outside of direct qualifying position in the IJF World Ranking List of May 30, 2016.

Athlete	Event	Round of 32	Round of 16	Quarterfinals	Semifinals	Repechage	Final / BM	
Athlete	Event	Opposition Result	Opposition Result	Opposition Result	Opposition Result	Opposition Result	Opposition Result	Rank
Kunathip Yea-on	Men's +100 kg	Natea (ROU); L 000–100	Did not advance					

== Rowing ==
Thailand has qualified one boat each in the men's and women's single sculls at the 2016 Asia & Oceania Continental Qualification Regatta in Chungju, South Korea.

Athlete	Event	Heats		Repechage		Quarterfinals		Semifinals		Final	
Athlete	Event	Time	Rank	Time	Rank	Time	Rank	Time	Rank	Time	Rank
Jaruwat Saensuk	Men's single sculls	7:25.06	4 R	7:16.39	3 SE/F	Bye		7:54.38	1 FE	7:49.86	26
Phuttharaksa Neegree	Women's single sculls	9:17:95	4 R	8:07.92	4 SE/F	Bye		8:51.99	3 FE	8:41.34	27

Qualification Legend: FA=Final A (medal); FB=Final B (non-medal); FC=Final C (non-medal); FD=Final D (non-medal); FE=Final E (non-medal); FF=Final F (non-medal); SA/B=Semifinals A/B; SC/D=Semifinals C/D; SE/F=Semifinals E/F; QF=Quarterfinals; R=Repechage

== Sailing ==
Thai sailors have qualified one boat in each of the following classes through the individual fleet World Championships, and the Asian Sailing Championships.

Athlete	Event	Race													Net points	Final rank
Athlete	Event	1	2	3	4	5	6	7	8	9	10	11	12	M*	Net points	Final rank
Natthaphong Phonoppharat	Men's RS:X	32	29	32	14	~~37~~	21	30	24	25	25	28	27	EL	287	29
Keerati Bualong	Men's Laser	25	38	37	32	38	39	35	18	27	~~47~~	—N/a		EL	287	37
Siripon Kaewduangngam	Women's RS:X	19	23	22	18	11	2	~~27~~	7	18	14	15	17	EL	166	18
Kamolwan Chanyim	Women's Laser Radial	25	27	28	31	32	34	30	31	~~38~~	31	—N/a		EL	268	32

M = Medal race; EL = Eliminated – did not advance into the medal race

== Shooting ==
Thai shooters have achieved quota places for the following events by virtue of their best finishes at the 2015 ISSF World Cup series, and Asian Championships, as long as they obtained a minimum qualifying score (MQS) as of March 31, 2016.

Athlete	Event	Qualification		Semifinal		Final	
Athlete	Event	Points	Rank	Points	Rank	Points	Rank
Napis Tortungpanich	Men's 10 m air rifle	617.4	41	—N/a		Did not advance	
Napis Tortungpanich	Men's 50 m rifle prone	620.9	29	—N/a		Did not advance	
Napis Tortungpanich	Men's 50 m rifle 3 positions	1159	37	—N/a		Did not advance	
Attapon Uea-aree	Men's 50 m rifle prone	625.3	7 Q	—N/a		80.8	8
Sutiya Jiewchaloemmit	Women's skeet	68	10	Did not advance			
Pim-on Klaisuban	Women's 10 m air pistol	373	39	—N/a		Did not advance	
Pim-on Klaisuban	Women's 25 m pistol	575	23	Did not advance			
Tanyaporn Prucksakorn	Women's 10 m air pistol	378	27	—N/a		Did not advance	
Tanyaporn Prucksakorn	Women's 25 m pistol	568	32	Did not advance			

Qualification Legend: Q = Qualify for the next round; q = Qualify for the bronze medal (shotgun)

== Swimming ==
Thailand has received a Universality invitation from FINA to send two swimmers (one male and one female) to the Olympics.

Athlete	Event	Heat		Semifinal		Final	
Athlete	Event	Time	Rank	Time	Rank	Time	Rank
Radomyos Matjiur	Men's 100 m breaststroke	1:02.36	37	Did not advance			
Natthanan Junkrajang	Women's 100 m freestyle	56.24	32	Did not advance			

== Table tennis ==
Thailand has entered three athletes into the table tennis competition at the Games. Suthasini Sawettabut and incoming five-time Olympian Nanthana Komwong scored a second-stage victory each to book two out of six remaining Olympic spots in the women's singles at the Asian Qualification Tournament in Hong Kong. Meanwhile, Padasak Tanviriyavechakul received an unused Olympic spot in the men's singles as the next highest-ranked player, after Hong Kong made its decision to decline a berth in the same tournament.

Athlete	Event	Preliminary	Round 1	Round 2	Round 3	Round of 16	Quarterfinals	Semifinals	Final / BM	
Athlete	Event	Opposition Result	Opposition Result	Opposition Result	Opposition Result	Opposition Result	Opposition Result	Opposition Result	Opposition Result	Rank
Padasak Tanviriyavechakul	Men's singles	Bye	Ghosh (IND); W 4–1	Gionis (GRE); L 0–4	Did not advance					
Nanthana Komwong	Women's singles	Bye	Meshref (EGY); W 4–1	Yu F (POR); W 4–3	Han Y (GER); L 0–4	Did not advance				
Suthasini Sawettabut	Women's singles	Bye	Han X (CGO); W 4–3	Li Jiao (NED); L 2–4	Did not advance					

== Taekwondo ==
Panipak Wongpattanakit qualified automatically for the women's flyweight category (49 kg) by finishing in the top 6 WTF Olympic rankings. Meanwhile, Tawin Hanprab and Phannapa Harnsujin secured the remaining spots on the Thai team by virtue of their top two finish in the men's flyweight (58 kg) and women's lightweight category (57 kg), respectively, at the 2016 Asian Qualification Tournament in Manila, Philippines.

Athlete	Event	Round of 16	Quarterfinals	Semifinals	Repechage	Final / BM	
Athlete	Event	Opposition Result	Opposition Result	Opposition Result	Opposition Result	Opposition Result	Rank
Tawin Hanprab	Men's −58 kg	Kim T-h (KOR); W 12–10	Khalil (AUS); W 11–9	Pie (DOM); W 11–7	Bye	Zhao S (CHN); L 4–6	2nd place, silver medalist(s)
Panipak Wongpattanakit	Women's −49 kg	Andrade (CPV); W 18–6 PTG	Kim S-h (KOR); L 5–6	Did not advance	Diez (PER); W 4–2	Manjarrez (MEX); W 15–3 PTG	3rd place, bronze medalist(s)
Phannapa Harnsujin	Women's −57 kg	Calvo (ESP); L 5−6	Did not advance		Alizadeh (IRI); L 10–14	Did not advance	7

== Tennis ==
Thailand has entered two tennis players into the Olympic tournament, signifying the nation's return to the sport after an eight-year hiatus. Due to the withdrawal of several tennis players from the Games, twin brothers Sanchai and Sonchat Ratiwatana received a spare ITF Olympic place to compete in the men's doubles.

Athlete	Event	Round of 32	Round of 16	Quarterfinals	Semifinals	Final / BM	
Athlete	Event	Opposition Result	Opposition Result	Opposition Result	Opposition Result	Opposition Result	Rank
Sanchai Ratiwatana; Sonchat Ratiwatana	Men's doubles	Melo / Soares (BRA); L 0–6, 6–7^{(1–7)}	Did not advance				

== Weightlifting ==
Thai weightlifters have qualified five men's and four women's quota places for the Rio Olympics based on their combined team standing by points at the 2014 and 2015 IWF World Championships. The team must allocate these places to individual athletes by June 20, 2016.

The full weightlifting team, headlined by London 2012 silver medalist Pimsiri Sirikaew, was named to the Thai roster on July 18, 2016.

Men

Athlete	Event	Snatch		Clean & Jerk		Total	Rank
Athlete	Event	Result	Rank	Result	Rank	Total	Rank
Sinphet Kruaithong	−56 kg	132	3	157	3	289	3rd place, bronze medalist(s)
Witoon Mingmoon	−56 kg	113	11	148	7	261	9
Tairat Bunsuk	−69 kg	137	17	179	8	316	12
Chatuphum Chinnawong	−77 kg	165	4	191	6	356	4
Sarat Sumpradit	−94 kg	177	3	213	4	390	4

Women

Athlete	Event	Snatch		Clean & Jerk		Total	Rank
Athlete	Event	Result	Rank	Result	Rank	Total	Rank
Sopita Tanasan	−48 kg	92	1	108	1	200	1st place, gold medalist(s)
Pimsiri Sirikaew	−58 kg	102	2	130	2	232	2nd place, silver medalist(s)
Sukanya Srisurat	−58 kg	110 OR	1	130	1	240	1st place, gold medalist(s)
Siripuch Gulnoi	−63 kg	108	3	~~132~~	DNF	108	DNF

== See also ==
- Thailand at the 2016 Summer Paralympics
