= Rosa Keleku =

Congolese taekwondo practitioner

Rosa Keleku Lukusa
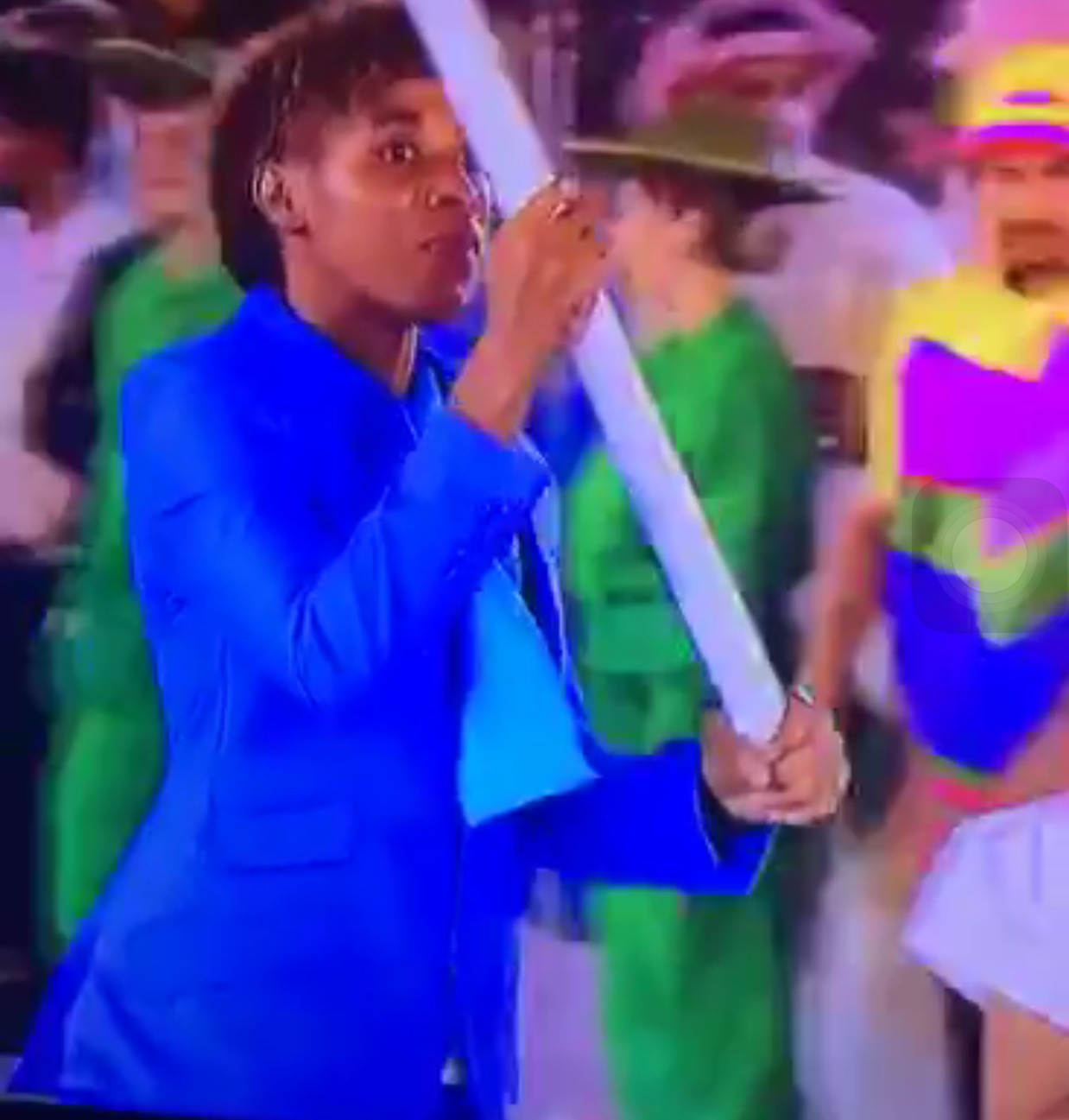
- Rosa carrying the Congolese flag at Rio 2016

Personal information
- Nationality: Congolese
- Born: 16 January 1995 (age 31) Kinshasa, Zaire
- Height: 163 cm (5 ft 4 in)
- Weight: 48 kg (106 lb)

Sport
- Country: Democratic Republic of the Congo
- Sport: Taekwondo

Rosa Keleku (born 16 January 1995) is a Democratic Republic of the Congo taekwondo athlete.

At the 2015 African Games she won a silver medal in the 49 kg category. She qualified for the 2016 Summer Olympics and she carried her country's flag in the opening ceremony in Rio de Janeiro. She was the only one of her country's team to qualify. The other members of her country's team were chosen under a principle of universality. She competed in the women's 49 kg, where she lost to Itzel Manjarrez in the preliminaries.

Olympic Games
Preceded by Ilunga Mande Zatara	Flagbearer for Democratic Republic of the Congo; Rio de Janeiro 2016	Succeeded by Marcelat Sakobi Matshu David Tshama
