= Monica Pimentel =

Aruban taekwondo practitioner (born 1989)

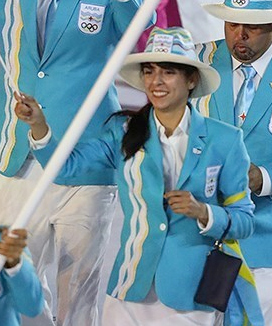
- Pimentel at the 2016 Olympics

Personal information
- Nationality: Aruban
- Born: 7 January 1989 (age 37)
- Height: 171 cm (5 ft 7 in)

Sport
- Sport: Taekwondo
- Club: Noord Taekwondo Center
- Coached by: Philippe Pinerd

Monica Fiorella Pimentel Rodriguez (born 7 January 1989) is an Aruban taekwondo practitioner. She competed in the 49 kg division at the 2016 Summer Olympics and lost to Yasmina Aziez in the preliminaries.
