= Congo at the 2016 Summer Olympics =

Republic of the Congo Democratic Republic of the Congo

Congo at the 2016 Summer Olympics may refer to:

- Republic of the Congo at the 2016 Summer Olympics
- Democratic Republic of the Congo at the 2016 Summer Olympics
