= Taekwondo at the 2016 Summer Olympics – Women's 49 kg =

Taekwondo competition

Women's 49kg at the Games of the XXXI Olympiad
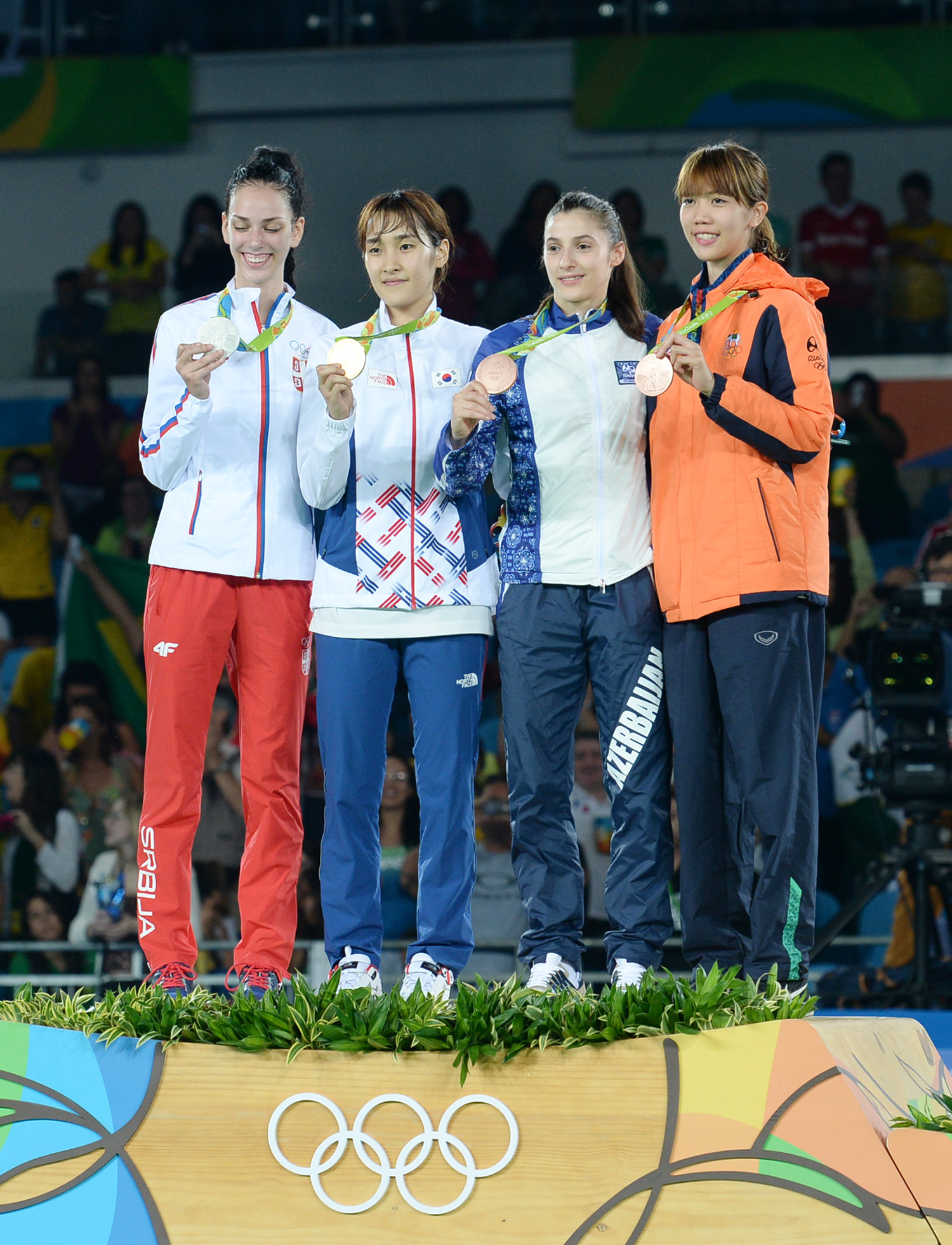
- Awarding ceremony
- Venue: Carioca Arena 3
- Date: 17 August 2016
- Competitors: 16 from 16 nations

Medalists
1st place, gold medalist(s)		Kim So-hui	South Korea
2nd place, silver medalist(s)		Tijana Bogdanović	Serbia
3rd place, bronze medalist(s)		Patimat Abakarova	Azerbaijan
3rd place, bronze medalist(s)		Panipak Wongpattanakit	Thailand

The women's 49 kg competition at the 2016 Summer Olympics was held on 17 August, at the Carioca Arena 3. Chinese defending champion Wu Jingyu lost to the silver medalist Tijana Bogdanović in the quarterfinal, unable to win her third Olympic gold. Instead, South Korea's Kim So-hui finished first, beating Panipak Wongpattanakit from Thailand in the process. Wongpattanakit eventually grabbed a bronze medal in the repechage.

== Competition format ==
The main bracket consisted of a single elimination tournament, culminating in the gold medal match. The top eight athletes in each event were seeded so as not to face each other in the preliminary round. The remainder of the qualified athletes were drawn randomly on 15 August 2016. Two bronze medals were awarded at the Taekwondo competitions. A repechage was used to determine the bronze medal winners. Every competitor who lost to one of the two finalists competed in the repechage, another single-elimination competition. Each semifinal loser faced the last remaining repechage competitor from the opposite half of the bracket in a bronze medal match.

== Schedule ==
All times are in local time (UTC-3).

Date	Time	Round
Wednesday, 17 August 2016	9:00; 15:00; 17:00; 20:00; 21:00; 22:00	Preliminary round Quarterfinals; Semifinals; Repechage; Bronze medal matches Final

== Seeds ==
Every practitioner was seeded at the event. Practitioners representing the hosting nation were seeded as no. 4 regardless of their current world ranking.

1. Wu Jingyu (CHN)
2. Panipak Wongpattanakit (THA)
3. Lucija Zaninović (CRO)
4. Iris Sing (BRA)
5. Itzel Manjarrez (MEX)
6. Yasmina Aziez (FRA)
7. Kim So-hui (KOR)
8. Tijana Bogdanović (SRB)
9. Patimat Abakarova (AZE)
10. Julissa Diez (PER)
11. Monica Pimentel (ARU)
12. Rosa Keleku (COD)
13. Andrea Kilday (NZL)
14. Ainur Yesbergenova (KAZ)
15. Maria Andrade (CPV)
16. Huang Huai-hsuan (TPE)

== Results ==
Legend

- PTG – Won by points gap
- SUD – Won by sudden death (golden point)

=== Main bracket ===
Preliminary round
13	Andrea Kilday (NZL)	5
4	Iris Tang Sing (BRA)	7
5	Itzel Manjarrez (MEX)	9
12	Rosa Keleku (COD)	5
9	Patimat Abakarova (AZE)	2
8	Tijana Bogdanović (SRB)	3
1	Wu Jingyu (CHN)	10
16	Huang Huai-hsuan (TPE)	1
15	Maria Andrade (CPV)	6
2	Panipak Wongpattanakit (THA)	18 (PTG)
7	Kim So-hui (KOR)	10
10	Julissa Diez (PER)	2
11	Monica Pimentel (ARU)	1
6	Yasmina Aziez (FRA)	2
3	Lucija Zaninović (CRO)	18
14	Ainur Yesbergenova (KAZ)	7

Quarterfinals
4	Iris Sing (BRA)	4
5	Itzel Manjarrez (MEX)	14
8	Tijana Bogdanović (SRB)	17
1	Wu Jingyu (CHN)	7
2	Panipak Wongpattanakit (THA)	5
7	Kim So-hui (KOR)	6
6	Yasmina Aziez (FRA)	4
3	Lucija Zaninović (CRO)	3

Semifinals
5	Itzel Manjarrez (MEX)	0
8	Tijana Bogdanović (SRB)	10
7	Kim So-hui (KOR)	1 (SUD)
6	Yasmina Aziez (FRA)	0

Gold medal match
8	Tijana Bogdanović (SRB)	6
7	Kim So-hui (KOR)	7

=== Repechage ===
Repechage
Wu Jingyu (CHN)	3
Patimat Abakarova (AZE)	4
Julissa Diez (PER)	2
Panipak Wongpattanakit (THA)	4

Bronze medal matches
Yasmina Aziez (FRA)	2
Patimat Abakarova (AZE)	7
Panipak Wongpattanakit (THA)	15 (PTG)
Itzel Manjarrez (MEX)	3
