= Sven Maresch =

German judoka (born 1987)

Personal information
- Born: 19 January 1987 (age 39) Erfurt, East Germany
- Occupation: Judoka
- Height: 173 cm (5 ft 8 in)

Sport
- Country: Germany
- Sport: Judo
- Weight class: ‍–‍81 kg

Achievements and titles
- Olympic Games: R32 (2016)
- World Champ.: 7th (2015)
- European Champ.: (bronze) (2014)
Medal record
Men's judo
Representing Germany
European Championships
Bronze medal – third place	2014 Montpellier	‍–‍81 kg
IJF Grand Slam
Gold medal – first place	2011 Moscow	‍–‍81 kg
Gold medal – first place	2013 Moscow	‍–‍81 kg
Bronze medal – third place	2011 Tokyo	‍–‍81 kg
Bronze medal – third place	2015 Tyumen	‍–‍81 kg
IJF Grand Prix
Gold medal – first place	2010 Abu Dhabi	‍–‍81 kg
Gold medal – first place	2014 Samsun	‍–‍81 kg
Silver medal – second place	2013 Qingdao	‍–‍81 kg
Silver medal – second place	2013 Abu Dhabi	‍–‍81 kg
Silver medal – second place	2014 Düsseldorf	‍–‍81 kg
Silver medal – second place	2016 Düsseldorf	‍–‍81 kg
Silver medal – second place	2016 Budapest	‍–‍81 kg
Bronze medal – third place	2015 Düsseldorf	‍–‍81 kg
Bronze medal – third place	2015 Budapest	‍–‍81 kg
European U23 Championships
Gold medal – first place	2009 Antalya	‍–‍81 kg
Silver medal – second place	2008 Zagreb	‍–‍81 kg
European Junior Championships
Gold medal – first place	2006 Tallinn	‍–‍81 kg

Profile at external databases
- IJF: 984
- JudoInside.com: 29600
- Updated on 14 November 2022

Sven Maresch (born 19 January 1987) is a German judoka. He competed at the 2016 Summer Olympics in the men's 81 kg event, in which he was eliminated by Sergiu Toma in the second round.
