= Peru at the 2016 Summer Olympics =

- IOC code: PER
- NOC: Peruvian Olympic Committee
- Website: www.coperu.org (in Spanish)

in Rio de Janeiro
- Competitors: 29 in 11 sports
- Flag bearer: Francisco Boza
- Medals: Gold 0 Silver 0 Bronze 0 Total 0

Summer Olympics appearances (overview)
- 1900; 1904–1932; 1936; 1948; 1952; 1956; 1960; 1964; 1968; 1972; 1976; 1980; 1984; 1988; 1992; 1996; 2000; 2004; 2008; 2012; 2016; 2020; 2024; 2028

Peru competed at the 2016 Summer Olympics in Rio de Janeiro, Brazil, from 5 to 21 August 2016. Since the nation's official debut in 1936, Peruvian athletes have appeared in every edition of the Summer Olympic Games throughout the modern era. Peru failed to register any athletes at the 1952 Summer Olympics in Helsinki.

Peruvian Olympic Committee (Spanish: Comité Olímpico Peruano) sent the nation's largest delegation to the Games without any association to the women's volleyball team for the first time in history. A total of 29 athletes, 17 men and 12 women, were selected to the Peruvian squad across eleven sports. Among the sporting events represented by the nation's athletes, Peru marked its Olympic debut in artistic gymnastics and women's freestyle wrestling, as well as its return to equestrian for more than three decades.

Trap shooter and 1984 silver medalist Francisco Boza etched his name into the historic records as the first ever Peruvian to compete in eight Olympic Games. The oldest and the most experienced participant (aged 52), Boza reprised his role to lead the Peruvian team for the third time as the nation's flag bearer in the opening ceremony, the previous two doing so in Barcelona 1992 and Athens 2004. Apart from Boza, seven other athletes were returning Olympians, with only two headed to their third Games, including marathoner Inés Melchor and Laser Radial sailor Paloma Schmidt. 21 Peruvian athletes made their Olympic debut in Rio de Janeiro; the most notable were middle-distance runner and dual American citizen David Torrence and gymnast Ariana Orrego, the youngest of the roster (aged 18).

Peru, however, failed to win a single medal in Rio de Janeiro, continuing a drought that began at the 1992 Summer Olympics in Barcelona, where shooter Juan Giha took the silver in the mixed skeet. Peru's most successful outcome at these Games occurred in taekwondo, where Julissa Diez bounced back from her early elimination to finish seventh in the women's 49 kg, losing the repechage bout to Thailand's Panipak Wongpattanakit.

== Athletics (track and field) ==
Peruvian athletes have so far achieved qualifying standards in the following athletics events (up to a maximum of 3 athletes in each event):

Key

- Note–Ranks given for track events are within the athlete's heat only
- Q = Qualified for the next round
- q = Qualified for the next round as a fastest loser or, in field events, by position without achieving the qualifying target
- NR = National record
- N/A = Round not applicable for the event
- Bye = Athlete not required to compete in round
- NM = No mark

Track & road events
Men

| Athlete | Event | Heat | | Final | |
| Athlete | Event | Result | Rank | Result | Rank |
|---|---|---|---|---|---|
| David Torrence | 5000 m | 13:23.20 NR | 10 q | 13:43.12 | 15 |
| Luis Ostos | 10000 m | —N/a | | 28:02.03 | 21 |
| Raúl Machacuay | Marathon | —N/a | | 2:18:00 | 45 |
| Christian Pacheco | Marathon | —N/a | | 2:18:41 | 52 |
| Raúl Pacheco | Marathon | —N/a | | 2:20:13 | 66 |
| Paolo Yurivilca | 20 km walk | —N/a | | 1:24:48 | 41 |
| Luis Henry Campos | 50 km walk | —N/a | | DNF | |
| Pavel Chihuán | 50 km walk | —N/a | | 4:32:37 | 48 |

Women

| Athlete | Event | Final | |
| Athlete | Event | Result | Rank |
|---|---|---|---|
| Jovana de la Cruz | Marathon | 2:35.49 | 36 |
| Inés Melchor | Marathon | DNF | |
| Gladys Tejeda | Marathon | 2:29.55 | 15 |
| Kimberly García | 20 km walk | 1:32:09 | 14 |
| Jessica Hancco | 20 km walk | 1:39:08 | 51 |

Field events

| Athlete | Event | Qualification | | Final | |
| Athlete | Event | Distance | Position | Distance | Position |
|---|---|---|---|---|---|
| Arturo Chávez | Men's high jump | 2.22 | 29 | did not advance | |

== Equestrian ==
Peru has entered one jumping rider into the Olympic equestrian competition by virtue of a top six individual finish at the 2015 Pan American Games, scheduling to mark the nation's Olympic comeback for the first time since 1984.

=== Jumping ===
| Athlete | Horse | Event | Qualification | | | | | | | | Final | | | | | Total | |
| Athlete | Horse | Event | Round 1 | | Round 2 | | | Round 3 | | | Round A | | Round B | | | Total | |
| Athlete | Horse | Event | Penalties | Rank | Penalties | Total | Rank | Penalties | Total | Rank | Penalties | Rank | Penalties | Total | Rank | Penalties | Rank |
|---|---|---|---|---|---|---|---|---|---|---|---|---|---|---|---|---|---|
| Alonso Valdéz | Chief | Individual | 6 | 51 Q | 16 | 22 | 56 | did not advance | | | | | | | | | |

== Gymnastics ==
=== Artistic ===
Peru has entered one artistic gymnast into the Olympic competition for the first time. Ariana Orrego became the nation's first ever female gymnast to claim an Olympic spot in the apparatus and all-around events at the Olympic Test Event in Rio de Janeiro.

Women

| Athlete | Event | Qualification | | | | | | Final | | | | | |
| Athlete | Event | Apparatus | | | | Total | Rank | Apparatus | | | | Total | Rank |
| Athlete | Event | V | UB | BB | F | Total | Rank | V | UB | BB | F | Total | Rank |
|---|---|---|---|---|---|---|---|---|---|---|---|---|---|
| Ariana Orrego | Floor | —N/a | | | 13.166 | 13.166 | 54 | did not advance | | | | | |

== Judo ==
Peru has qualified one judoka for the men's extra-lightweight category (60 kg) at the Games. London 2012 Olympian Juan Postigos earned a continental quota spot from the Pan American region, as the highest-ranked Peruvian judoka outside of direct qualifying position in the IJF World Ranking List of May 30, 2016.

| Athlete | Event | Round of 64 | Round of 32 | Round of 16 | Quarterfinals | Semifinals | Repechage | Final / BM | |
| Athlete | Event | Opposition Result | Opposition Result | Opposition Result | Opposition Result | Opposition Result | Opposition Result | Opposition Result | Rank |
|---|---|---|---|---|---|---|---|---|---|
| Juan Postigos | Men's −60 kg | Bye | Safarov (AZE); L 000–011 | did not advance | | | | | |

== Rowing ==
Peru has qualified one boat each in the men's and women's single sculls for the Olympics at the 2016 Latin American Continental Qualification Regatta in Valparaíso, Chile.

| Athlete | Event | Heats | | Repechage | | Quarterfinals | | Semifinals | | Final | |
| Athlete | Event | Time | Rank | Time | Rank | Time | Rank | Time | Rank | Time | Rank |
|---|---|---|---|---|---|---|---|---|---|---|---|
| Renzo León García | Men's single sculls | 7:21.04 | 4 R | 7:25.55 | 2 QF | 7:30.91 | 6 SC/D | 7:37.34 | 5 FD | 7:02.28 | 20 |
| Camila Valle | Women's single sculls | 9:30.60 | 5 R | 8:32.66 | 6 SE/F | Bye | | 9:11.91 | 4 FF | 9:18.24 | 31 |

Qualification Legend: FA=Final A (medal); FB=Final B (non-medal); FC=Final C (non-medal); FD=Final D (non-medal); FE=Final E (non-medal); FF=Final F (non-medal); SA/B=Semifinals A/B; SC/D=Semifinals C/D; SE/F=Semifinals E/F; QF=Quarterfinals; R=Repechage

== Sailing ==
Peruvian sailors have qualified one boat in each of the following classes through the individual fleet World Championships, and South American qualifying regattas.

| Athlete | Event | Race | | | | | | | | | | | Net points | Final rank |
| Athlete | Event | 1 | 2 | 3 | 4 | 5 | 6 | 7 | 8 | 9 | 10 | M* | Net points | Final rank |
|---|---|---|---|---|---|---|---|---|---|---|---|---|---|---|
| Stefano Peschiera | Men's Laser | 37 | 40 | 16 | 16 | 28 | 22 | 21 | 27 | 35 | ~~DNF~~ | EL | 242 | 31 |
| Paloma Schmidt | Women's Laser Radial | 31 | 26 | 29 | 27 | 29 | 30 | 18 | ~~32~~ | 30 | 29 | EL | 248 | 31 |

M = Medal race; EL = Eliminated – did not advance into the medal race

== Shooting ==
Peruvian shooters have achieved quota places for the following events by virtue of their best finishes at the 2015 Pan American Games, as long as they obtained a minimum qualifying score (MQS) by March 31, 2016.

| Athlete | Event | Qualification | | Semifinal | | Final | |
| Athlete | Event | Points | Rank | Points | Rank | Points | Rank |
|---|---|---|---|---|---|---|---|
| Francisco Boza | Men's trap | 109 | 28 | did not advance | | | |
| Marko Carrillo | Men's 10 m air pistol | 566 | 43 | —N/a | | did not advance | |
| Marko Carrillo | Men's 25 m rapid fire pistol | 557 | 24 | —N/a | | did not advance | |
| Marko Carrillo | Men's 50 m pistol | 536 | 35 | —N/a | | did not advance | |

Qualification Legend: Q = Qualify for the next round; q = Qualify for the bronze medal (shotgun)

== Swimming ==
Peru has received a Universality invitation from FINA to send two swimmers (one male and one female) to the Olympics.

| Athlete | Event | Heat | | Semifinal | | Final | |
| Athlete | Event | Time | Rank | Time | Rank | Time | Rank |
|---|---|---|---|---|---|---|---|
| Nicholas Magana | Men's 100 m freestyle | 51.53 | 53 | did not advance | | | |
| Andrea Cedrón | Women's 200 m freestyle | 2:05.33 | 39 | did not advance | | | |

== Taekwondo ==
Peru entered one athlete into the taekwondo competition at the Olympics. Julissa Diez secured a spot in the women's flyweight category (49 kg) by virtue of her top two finish at the 2016 Pan American Qualification Tournament in Aguascalientes, Mexico.

| Athlete | Event | Round of 16 | Quarterfinals | Semifinals | Repechage | Final / BM | |
| Athlete | Event | Opposition Result | Opposition Result | Opposition Result | Opposition Result | Opposition Result | Rank |
|---|---|---|---|---|---|---|---|
| Julissa Diez | Women's −49 kg | Kim S-h (KOR); L 2–10 | did not advance | | Wongpattanakit (THA); L 2–4 | Did not advance | 7 |

== Weightlifting ==
Peru has qualified one male weightlifter for the Rio Olympics by virtue of a top seven national finish at the 2016 Pan American Championships. Meanwhile, an unused women's Olympic spot was added to the Peruvian weightlifting team by IWF, as a response to the vacancy of women's quota places in the individual World Rankings and to the "multiple positive cases" of doping on several nations. The team must allocate these places to individual athletes by June 20, 2016.

| Athlete | Event | Snatch | | Clean & Jerk | | Total | Rank |
| Athlete | Event | Result | Rank | Result | Rank | Total | Rank |
|---|---|---|---|---|---|---|---|
| Hernán Viera | Men's −105 kg | 151 | 16 | 200 | 14 | 351 | 13 |
| Fiorella Cueva | Women's −53 kg | 65 | 12 | 88 | 11 | 153 | 11 |

== Wrestling ==
Peru has received a spare host berth freed up by Brazil as the next highest-ranked eligible nation, not yet qualified, to send a wrestler competing in the women's freestyle 58 kg to the Olympics, based on the results from the World Championships.

Key:

- VT – Victory by Fall.
- PP – Decision by Points – the loser with technical points.
- PO – Decision by Points – the loser without technical points.
- ST – Technical superiority – the loser without technical points and a margin of victory of at least 8 (Greco-Roman) or 10 (freestyle) points.

Women's freestyle

| Athlete | Event | Qualification | Round of 16 | Quarterfinal | Semifinal | Repechage 1 | Repechage 2 | Final / BM | |
| Athlete | Event | Opposition Result | Opposition Result | Opposition Result | Opposition Result | Opposition Result | Opposition Result | Opposition Result | Rank |
|---|---|---|---|---|---|---|---|---|---|
| Yanet Sovero | −58 kg | Bye | Rentería (COL); L 1–3 ^{PP} | did not advance | | | | | 18 |

== See also ==
- Peru at the 2015 Pan American Games
- Peru at the 2016 Summer Paralympics
