= 2015 World Judo Championships – Men's 81 kg =

Judo competition

Judo Men's 81 kg at the 2015 World Judo Championships
- Venue: Alau Ice Palace
- Location: Astana, Kazakhstan
- Date: 27 August
- Competitors: 76 from 61 nations
- Total prize money: 14,000$

Medalists
gold medal	Takanori Nagase (1st title)	Japan
silver medal	Loïc Pietri	France
bronze medal	Antoine Valois-Fortier	Canada
bronze medal	Victor Penalber	Brazil

Competition at external databases
- Links: IJF • JudoInside

The men's 81 kg competition of the 2015 World Judo Championships was held on 27 August 2015.

== Results ==
=== Finals ===
Semi-finals
(Georgia (country)) Avtandili Tchrikishvili	000
(Japan) Takanori Nagase	001
(Canada) Antoine Valois-Fortier	000
(France) Loïc Pietri	101

Final
(Japan) Takanori Nagase	100
(France) Loïc Pietri	000

=== Repechage ===
Repechage		Third place
(Germany) Sven Maresch	000
(South Korea) Lee Seung-su	000	(South Korea) Lee Seung-su	000
		(Canada) Antoine Valois-Fortier	001

Repechage		Third place
(Moldova) Valeriu Duminică	000
(Brazil) Victor Penalber	100	(Brazil) Victor Penalber	000
		(Georgia (country)) Avtandili Tchrikishvili	000

=== Pool A ===
First round fights

	Score	
Juan Turcios (El Salvador)	000–001	(France) Alain Schmitt
Diogo Lima (Portugal)	010–000	(Uruguay) Alain Aprahamian
Konstantīns Ovčiņņikovs (Latvia)	110–000	(Puerto Rico) Gadiel Miranda

Second Round
(Georgia (country)) Avtandili Tchrikishvili	100
(Netherlands) Frank de Wit	000
(Estonia) Jevgeni Salejev	000
(Kazakhstan) Aziz Kalkamanuly	110
(Iceland) Sveinbjörn Iura	000
(Tajikistan) Saidchamol Alimardonov	101
(Hungary) László Csoknyai	101
(France) Alain Schmitt	000
(Germany) Sven Maresch	100
(Kyrgyzstan) Vladimir Zoloev	000
(Australia) Eoin Coughlan	001
(Portugal) Diogo Lima	003
(Zambia) Boas Munyonga	000
(Bulgaria) Ivaylo Ivanov	001
(Sweden) Robin Pacek	100
(Latvia) Konstantīns Ovčiņņikovs	000

Third Round
(Georgia (country)) Avtandili Tchrikishvili	000
(Estonia) Jevgeni Salejev	000
(Tajikistan) Saidchamol Alimardonov	000
(Hungary) László Csoknyai	102
(Germany) Sven Maresch	000
(Portugal) Diogo Lima	000
(Bulgaria) Ivaylo Ivanov	001
(Sweden) Robin Pacek	010

Fourth Round
(Georgia (country)) Avtandili Tchrikishvili	100
(Hungary) László Csoknyai	000
(Germany) Sven Maresch	000
(Sweden) Robin Pacek	000

Quarterfinals
(Georgia (country)) Avtandili Tchrikishvili	000
(Germany) Sven Maresch	000

=== Pool B ===
First round fights

	Score	
Jaromír Musil (Czech Republic)	101–000	(Slovakia) Matúš Milichovský
Jakub Kubieniec (Poland)	100–000	(Philippines) Kodo Nakano
Cristian Bodîrlău (Romania)	000–001	(Belgium) Joachim Bottieau

Second Round
(Russia) Ivan Nifontov	110
(Czech Republic) Jaromír Musil	000
(Moldova) Nicon Zaboroșciuc	000
(South Korea) Lee Seung-su	100
(Greece) Roman Moustopoulos	000
(Brazil) Leandro Guilheiro	100
(Poland) Jakub Kubieniec	100
(Armenia) Rafael Davtyan	000
(Japan) Takanori Nagase	111
(Turkmenistan) Durdymyrat Hojagulyyev	000
(Gabon) Paul Kibikai	000
(Cuba) Iván Felipe Silva	101
(Fiji) Josateki Naulu	000
(Egypt) Mohamed Abdelaal	010

Third Round
(Russia) Ivan Nifontov	000
(South Korea) Lee Seung-su	110
(Brazil) Leandro Guilheiro	001
(Poland) Jakub Kubieniec	000
(Japan) Takanori Nagase	100
(Cuba) Iván Felipe Silva	000
(Egypt) Mohamed Abdelaal	000
(Belgium) Joachim Bottieau	000

Fourth Round
(South Korea) Lee Seung-su	100
(Brazil) Leandro Guilheiro	000
(Japan) Takanori Nagase	000
(Egypt) Mohamed Abdelaal	000

Quarterfinals
(South Korea) Lee Seung-su	000
(Japan) Takanori Nagase	100

=== Pool C ===
First round fights

	Score	
Otgonbaataryn Uuganbaatar (Mongolia)	100–000	(New Zealand) Ivica Pavlinic
Aliaksandr Stsiashenka (Belarus)	000–100	(Portugal) Carlos Luz
Erihemubatu (China)	000–002	(Armenia) Andranik Chapatyan

Second Round
(Canada) Antoine Valois-Fortier	000
(Mongolia) Otgonbaataryn Uuganbaatar	000
(Serbia) Nemanja Majdov	000
(Hungary) Szabolcs Krizsán	000
(Tajikistan) Farhod Rahimov	000
(United States) Travis Stevens	100
(Germany) Alexander Wieczerzak	010
(Montenegro) Srđan Mrvaljević	000
(South Korea) Kim Jae-bum	000
(Portugal) Carlos Luz	100
(Moldova) Valeriu Duminică	100
(Austria) Marcel Ott	000
(Saudi Arabia) Abdalkarim Al-Bishi	000
(Argentina) Emmanuel Lucenti	111
(Spain) Adrián Nacimiento	000
(Armenia) Andranik Chapatyan	000

Third Round
(Canada) Antoine Valois-Fortier	010
(Hungary) Szabolcs Krizsán	000
(United States) Travis Stevens	000
(Germany) Alexander Wieczerzak	100
(Portugal) Carlos Luz	000
(Moldova) Valeriu Duminică	001
(Argentina) Emmanuel Lucenti	000
(Spain) Adrián Nacimiento	101

Fourth Round
(Canada) Antoine Valois-Fortier	000
(Germany) Alexander Wieczerzak	000
(Moldova) Valeriu Duminică	110
(Spain) Adrián Nacimiento	000

Quarterfinals
(Canada) Antoine Valois-Fortier	100
(Moldova) Valeriu Duminică	000

=== Pool D ===
First round fights

	Score	
Denis Mititelu (Romania)	000–100	(Tunisia) Abdelaziz Ben Ammar
Hermann Monné (Burkina Faso)	000–100	(Colombia) Pedro Castro
Yakhyo Imamov (Uzbekistan)	110–000	(Palestine) Oday Thwaib

Second Round
(France) Loïc Pietri	100
(Iran) Saeid Mollaei	000
(Tunisia) Abdelaziz Ben Ammar	000
(Italy) Antonio Ciano	000
(Finland) Antti Virta	000
(Greece) Alexios Ntanatsidis	100
(Turkmenistan) Tejen Tejenov	100
(Colombia) Pedro Castro	001
(Brazil) Victor Penalber	100
(United Arab Emirates) Sergiu Toma	000
(Madagascar) Fetra Ratsimiziva	000
(Mozambique) Marlon Acácio	010
(North Korea) Pak Hong-wi	000
(Uzbekistan) Yakhyo Imamov	000
(Poland) Łukasz Błach	000
(Georgia (country)) Ushangi Margiani	100

Third Round
(France) Loïc Pietri	100
(Italy) Antonio Ciano	000
(Greece) Alexios Ntanatsidis	100
(Turkmenistan) Tejen Tejenov	000
(Brazil) Victor Penalber	100
(Mozambique) Marlon Acácio	000
(Uzbekistan) Yakhyo Imamov	101
(Georgia (country)) Ushangi Margiani	000

Fourth Round
(France) Loïc Pietri	100
(Greece) Alexios Ntanatsidis	001
(Brazil) Victor Penalber	100
(Uzbekistan) Yakhyo Imamov	000

Quarterfinals
(France) Loïc Pietri	002
(Brazil) Victor Penalber	000

== Prize money ==
The sums listed bring the total prizes awarded to 14,000$ for the individual event.

Medal	Total	Judoka	Coach
Gold	6,000$	4,800$	1,200$
Silver	4,000$	3,200$	800$
Bronze	2,000$	1,600$	400$
