= Ainur Yesbergenova =

Kazakhstani taekwondo practitioner

Personal information
- Born: 11 February 1998 (age 28) Kyzylorda, Kazakhstan
- Height: 164 cm (5 ft 5 in)
- Weight: 49 kg (108 lb)

Sport
- Country: Kazakhstan
- Sport: Taekwondo
Medal record
Women's taekwondo
Representing Kazakhstan
Islamic Solidarity Games
Silver medal – second place	2017 Baku	Flyweight −49 kg

Ainur Askarovna Yesbergenova (Kazakh: Айнұр Асқарқызы Есбергенова, born 11 February 1998) is a Kazakhstani taekwondo athlete.

She competed for Kazakhstan at the 2016 Summer Olympics in Rio de Janeiro, in the women's 49 kg event.
