= Huang Huai-hsuan =

Taiwanese taekwondo practitioner

Personal information
- Nationality: Taiwanese
- Born: 7 July 1997 (age 28)

Sport
- Sport: Taekwondo

Huang Huai-hsuan (Chinese: 黃懷萱; pinyin: Huáng Huáixuān; born 7 July 1997) is a Taiwanese taekwondo athlete.

She competed at the 2016 Summer Olympics in Rio de Janeiro, in the women's 49 kg.
