= Lee Seung-su =

South Korean judoka (born 1990)

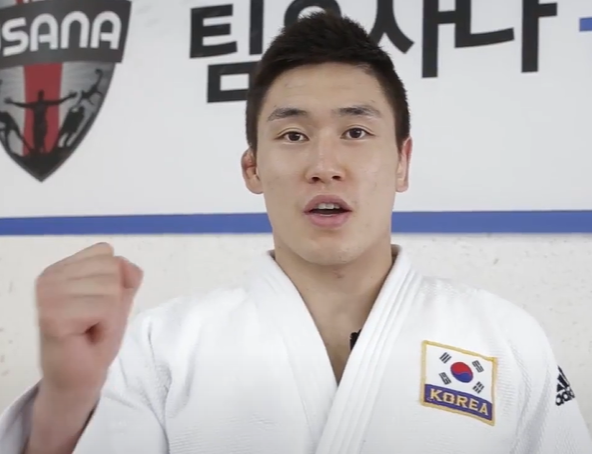
- Lee in 2016

Personal information
- Born: 20 July 1990 (age 36) Gwangmyeong
- Occupation: Judoka
- Height: 178 cm (5 ft 10 in)

Sport
- Country: South Korea
- Sport: Judo
- Weight class: ‍–‍81 kg

Achievements and titles
- Olympic Games: R16 (2016)
- World Champ.: 5th (2015)
- Asian Champ.: 5th (2017, 2018)
Medal record
Men's judo
Representing South Korea
World Championships
Bronze medal – third place	2018 Baku	Mixed team
IJF Grand Slam
Silver medal – second place	2015 Tokyo	‍–‍81 kg
Silver medal – second place	2018 Paris	‍–‍81 kg
IJF Grand Prix
Bronze medal – third place	2013 Rijeka	‍–‍81 kg
Bronze medal – third place	2013 Jeju	‍–‍81 kg
Bronze medal – third place	2018 Hohhot	‍–‍81 kg
Asian Junior Championships
Gold medal – first place	2008 Sana'a	‍–‍73 kg
Summer Universiade
Gold medal – first place	2017 Taipei	‍–‍81 kg
Silver medal – second place	2013 Kazan	Men's team

Profile at external databases
- IJF: 11103
- JudoInside.com: 55954
- Updated on 24 November 2022

Lee Seung-su (Korean: 이승수; born 20 July 1990) is a South Korean judoka.

== Career ==
Lee is the South Korea national team's primary half-middleweight fighter, having represented them at the 2014 and 2015 World Judo Championships. He was also chosen as the half-middleweight representative in the 2015 World team competition, where he won a silver medal.

His main skill is seoi nage, a trademark of the Korea national team.

On the International Judo Federation circuit, he has won a silver medal at the 2015 Grand Slam in Tokyo and the 2013 Grand Prix in Jeju and Rijeka.

A soldier of the Republic of Korea Armed Forces, Lee has participated in various military games, and most notably won the gold medal at the 2015 Military World Games in Mungyeong.

Lee became Korea's half-middleweight representative after defeating double world champion Wang Ki-chun as the latter ascended from lightweight. He has consistently won the national title in the weight division, however lost to Wang in the 2015 Korea National Championships.

Lee is ranked No. 29 in the world rankings, and is the second ranked in Korea for the Olympic qualifiers after Wang.

== Competitive record ==
Judo Record
Total	42
Wins	25
by Ippon	18
Losses	17
by Ippon	3
