= Itzel Manjarrez =

Mexican taekwondo practitioner

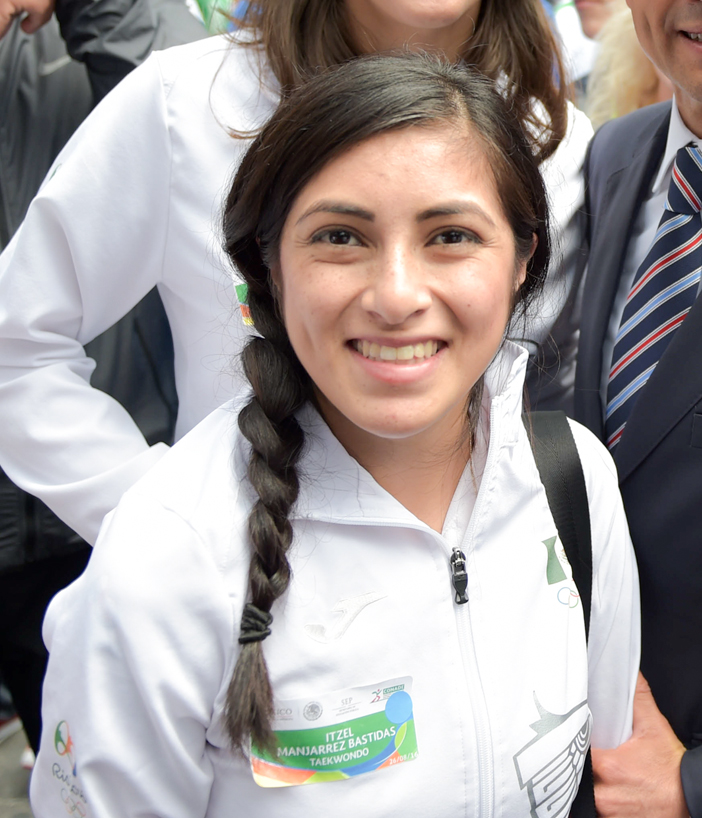

Personal information
- Full name: Itzel Adilene Manjarrez Bastidas
- Born: 10 April 1990 (age 36) Culiacán, Sinaloa, Mexico
- Height: 171 cm (5 ft 7 in)
- Weight: 49 kg (108 lb)

Sport
- Country: Mexico
- Sport: Taekwondo
- College team: UAS
Medal record
Representing Mexico
Pan American Games
Silver medal – second place	2015 Toronto	Flyweight
Summer Universiade
Bronze medal – third place	2011 Shenzhen	Flyweight
Bronze medal – third place	2017 Taipei	Flyweight
Central American and Caribbean Games
Gold medal – first place	2010 Mayaguez	Flyweight
Gold medal – first place	2014 Veracruz	Flyweight

Itzel Adilene Manjarrez Bastidas (Note: In this Spanish name, the first or paternal surname is Manjarrez and the second or maternal family name is Bastidas.) (born 10 April 1990) is a former taekwondo practitioner from Mexico, who competed at the 2016 Summer Olympics in the women's 49 kg.

A graduate of the Autonomous University of Sinaloa, she announced her retirement in December 2018.
