= Yasmina Aziez =

French taekwondo practitioner

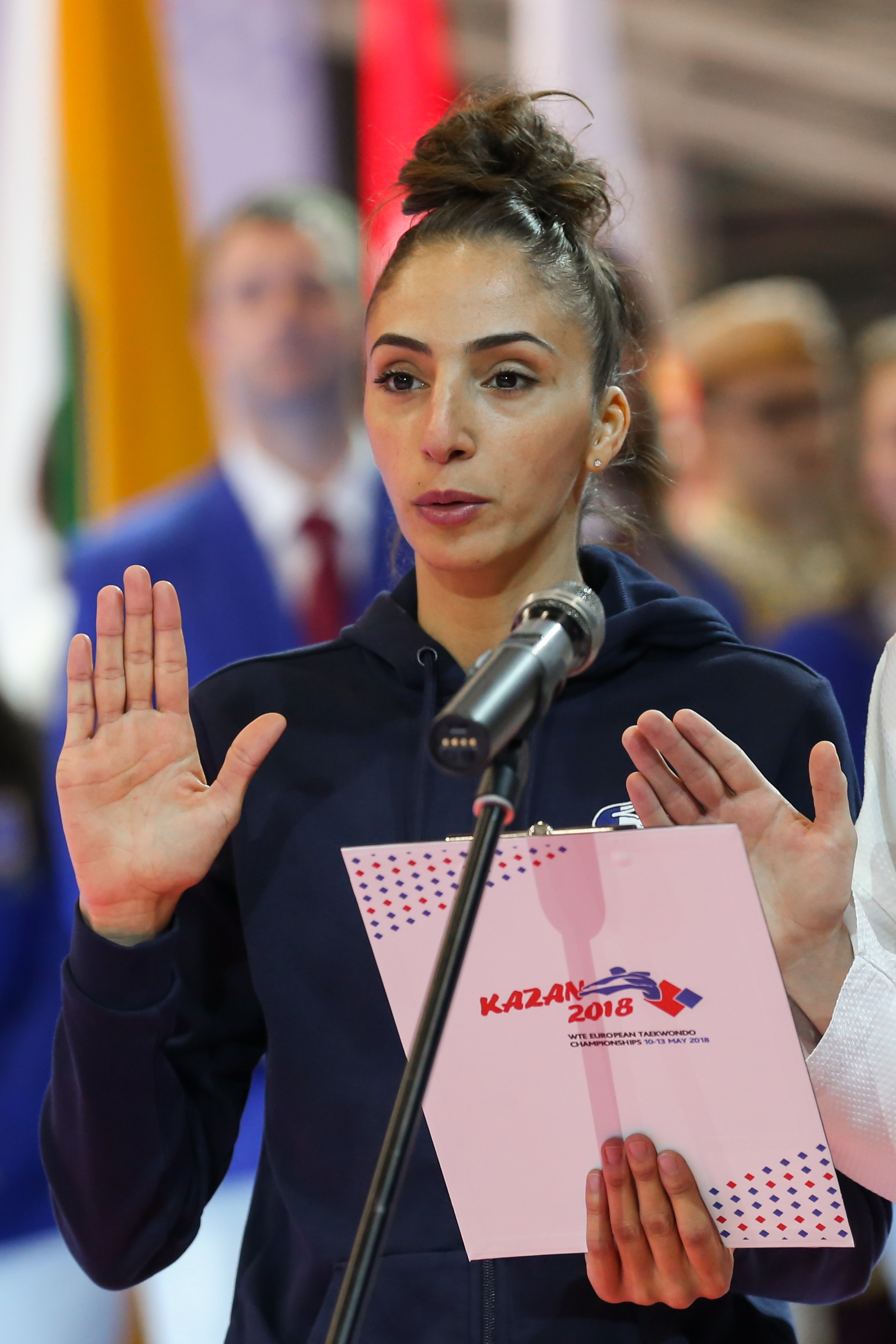
- Aziez in 2018

Personal information
- Nationality: French
- Born: 23 January 1991 (age 35) Lyon, France
- Height: 1.71 m (5 ft 7 in)
- Weight: 49 kg (108 lb)

Sport
- Country: France
- Sport: Taekwondo

Yasmina Aziez (born 23 January 1991) is a French taekwondo athlete.

She represented France at the 2016 Summer Olympics in Rio de Janeiro, in the women's 49 kg. In this category she won a bronze medal at the world championships in Copenhagen.
