= Boxing at the Summer Olympics =

- IOC Code: BOX
- Governing body: World Boxing (since 2028)
- Events: 14 (men: 7; women: 7)

Summer Olympics
- 1896; 1900; 1904; 1908; 1912; 1920; 1924; 1928; 1932; 1936; 1948; 1952; 1956; 1960; 1964; 1968; 1972; 1976; 1980; 1984; 1988; 1992; 1996; 2000; 2004; 2008; 2012; 2016; 2020; 2024; 2028; 2032
- Medalists

Boxing has been contested at every Summer Olympic Games since its introduction to the program at the 1904 Summer Olympics, except for the 1912 Summer Olympics in Stockholm, because Swedish law banned the sport at the time. The 2008 Summer Olympics were the final games with boxing as a male only event. Since the 2012 Summer Olympics, women's boxing is part of the program.

== Summary ==
Games	Year	Events	Best Nation
1			
2			
3	1904	7	United States (1)
4	1908	5	Great Britain (1)
5			
6			
7	1920	8	United States (2)
8	1924	8	United States (3)
9	1928	8	Italy (1)
10	1932	8	Argentina (1)
11	1936	8	Germany (1)
12			
13			
14	1948	8	South Africa (1)
15	1952	10	United States (4)
16	1956	10	Soviet Union (1)
17	1960	10	Italy (2)

Games	Year	Events	Best Nation
18	1964	10	Soviet Union (2)
19	1968	11	Soviet Union (3)
20	1972	11	Cuba (1)
21	1976	11	United States (5)
22	1980	11	Cuba (2)
23	1984	12	United States (6)
24	1988	12	United States (7)
25	1992	12	Cuba (3)
26	1996	12	Cuba (4)
27	2000	12	Cuba (5)
28	2004	11	Cuba (6)
29	2008	11	China (1)
30	2012	13	Great Britain (2)
31	2016	13	Uzbekistan (1)
32	2020	13	Cuba (7)
33	2024	13	Uzbekistan (2)
34	2028	14	TBD

== History ==
Boxing made its first appearance at the 1904 Summer Olympics as a men's event. Due to few competitors at the time, only North American boxers competed for this edition. Since then, boxing has been contested at every Summer Olympic Games besides the 1912 Summer Olympics in Stockholm, because Swedish law banned martial arts at the time.

Until 1948, losing semi-finalists competed in a match for a bronze medal. However, in 1950 the Amateur International Boxing Association (AIBA) decided to discontinue the bronze medal match as the short time interval between the semi-finals and the third-place match allowed limited time for competitors to recover. In 1970, AIBA proposed for both losing semi-finalists to receive a bronze medals, which was accepted by the International Olympic Committee (IOC) and implemented since the 1972 Summer Olympics. Losing semi-finalists from 1952 to 1968 were also retroactively awarded bronze medals after initially only receiving Olympic diplomas.

In 2007, AIBA changed its full name to the "International Boxing Association" as part of a rebranding, albeit maintaining "AIBA" as its abbreviated name.

At the 2012 Summer Olympics, women's boxing events were added to the programme for the first time. In 2016, AIBA allowed professional boxers to compete in Olympic events, previously having been limited to amateur or state-funded boxers, for the first time.

On 22 May 2019, the International Olympic Committee (IOC) announced that AIBA had been stripped of the right to organise the 2020 tournament, due to "issues in the areas of finance, governance, ethics and refereeing and judging". Olympic boxing was instead organised by an ad-hoc task force led by Morinari Watanabe, president of the International Gymnastics Federation. In 2021, AIBA unveiled a new logo and officially adopted "IBA" as its abbreviated name.

Amidst the Russian invasion of Ukraine in 2022, 18 national boxing federations formed a consortium known as the "Common Cause Alliance" (CCA), which called for greater transparency on the IBA's finances (including its Gazprom agreement), determine the detrimental effects of the invasion, and for the organisation to take stronger action against the Russian Boxing Federation. The CCA also pledged support for boxing to continue being an Olympic sport.

During the IBA Congress in May 2022, one day before the presidential vote, five candidates connected to the CCA were deemed ineligible by the IBA's Interim Nomination Unit, accusing them of engaging in prohibited "collaborations" and campaigning outside of the designated period. One of the candidates–Dutch official Boris van der Vorst–filed an appeal with the Court of Arbitration for Sport (CAS), stating that the candidates had been approved by the IBA's Disciplinary Committee, which had also approved the CCA's activities as being supportive of the IBA's mission. The CAS overruled the IBA decision, resulting in an Extraordinary IBA Congress in September; however, the IBA's members voted against van der Vorst's proposal to challenge Umar Kremlev's re-election as president. By December 2022, the membership of the Common Cause Alliance had grown to 25 federations.

In April 2023, the IOC maintained the need to recognize a new international federation for boxing by early 2025, otherwise the sport's presence at the 2028 Summer Olympics would be at risk. On 13 April 2023, World Boxing was launched as a competitor to the IBA, with its interim board including officials from member organizations of the CCA, and van der Vorst was named inaugural president.

On 22 June 2023, the IOC Executive Board voted to permanently withdraw its recognition of the IBA, citing a continued lack of progress on governance, finances and addressing corruption since its original suspension. This was the first-ever international federation to be removed from the Olympic Movement by the IOC. At the 2024 Summer Olympics, boxing was run by the IOC's "Paris Boxing Unit". On 30 September 2024, the IOC asked National Olympic Committees to derecognise boxing bodies that remained tied to the IBA.

On 26 February 2025, the IOC announced that it had granted provisional recognition to World Boxing as an international federation for Olympic boxing, citing its ongoing progress on membership reach and commitments to competitive integrity. On 17 March 2025, the IOC Executive Board recommended adding boxing to the sports programme of the 2028 Summer Olympics. On 20 March 2025, during the 144th IOC session, boxing was unanimously voted to be included in the 2028 Games.

In April 2025, the IOC announced that one additional women's weight class would be added to boxing for parity with the men's events, bringing the total to 14 medal events at the 2028 Summer Olympics.

== Events ==
The boxing competition is organized as a set of tournaments, one for each weight class. The number of weight classes has changed over the years (currently 7 for men and 6 for women), and the definition of each class has changed several times, as shown in the following table. Until 1936, weights were measured in pounds, and from 1948 onwards, weights were measured in kilograms.

On 23 March 2013, the International Boxing Association instituted significant changes to the format. The World Series of Boxing, AIBA's pro team league which started in 2010, already enabled team members to retain 2012 Olympic eligibility. The newer AIBA Pro Boxing Tournament, consisting of boxers who sign 5-year contracts with AIBA and compete on pro cards leading up to the tournament, also provides a pathway for new pros to retain their Olympic eligibility and retain ties with national committees.

From the 2016 Summer Olympics, male athletes no longer have to wear protective headgear in competition, due to a ruling by the AIBA and the IOC that it contributes to greater concussion risk. Female athletes will continue to wear the headgear, due to "lack of data" on the effectiveness of it on women. Also from 2016 onwards, the "10-point must" scoring system was used.

Men's weight classes
1904 (Note: Boxers were allowed to compete in multiple weight classes in 1904, as long as they were not over the maximum weight for each class.)	1908	1920–1936	1948	1952–1964	1968–1980	1984–2000	2004–2008	2012–2016	2020	2024
Heavyweight +158 lb (+71.7 kg)		Heavyweight +175 lb (+79.4 kg)	Heavyweight +80 kg	Heavyweight +81 kg		Super heavyweight +91 kg				Super heavyweight +92 kg
Heavyweight +158 lb (+71.7 kg)		Heavyweight +175 lb (+79.4 kg)	Heavyweight +80 kg	Heavyweight +81 kg		Super heavyweight +91 kg				Heavyweight; 80–92 kg
Heavyweight +158 lb (+71.7 kg)		Heavyweight +175 lb (+79.4 kg)	Heavyweight +80 kg	Heavyweight +81 kg		Heavyweight; 81–91 kg				Heavyweight; 80–92 kg
Heavyweight +158 lb (+71.7 kg)		Heavyweight +175 lb (+79.4 kg)	Heavyweight +80 kg	Light heavyweight 75–81 kg						Heavyweight; 80–92 kg
Heavyweight +158 lb (+71.7 kg)		Heavyweight +175 lb (+79.4 kg)	Light heavyweight 73–80 kg	Light heavyweight 75–81 kg						Middleweight; 71–80 kg
Heavyweight +158 lb (+71.7 kg)		Light heavyweight 160–175 lb (72.6–79.4 kg)	Light heavyweight 73–80 kg	Light heavyweight 75–81 kg						Middleweight; 71–80 kg
Heavyweight +158 lb (+71.7 kg)		Light heavyweight 160–175 lb (72.6–79.4 kg)	Light heavyweight 73–80 kg	Middleweight; 71–75 kg			Middleweight; 69–75 kg			Middleweight; 71–80 kg
Heavyweight +158 lb (+71.7 kg)		Light heavyweight 160–175 lb (72.6–79.4 kg)	Middleweight; 67–73 kg	Middleweight; 71–75 kg			Middleweight; 69–75 kg			Middleweight; 71–80 kg
Heavyweight +158 lb (+71.7 kg)		Middleweight; 147–160 lb (66.7–72.6 kg)	Middleweight; 67–73 kg	Middleweight; 71–75 kg			Middleweight; 69–75 kg			Middleweight; 71–80 kg
Middleweight; 145–158 lb (65.8–71.7 kg)	Middleweight; 140–158 lb (63.5–71.7 kg)	Middleweight; 147–160 lb (66.7–72.6 kg)	Middleweight; 67–73 kg	Middleweight; 71–75 kg			Middleweight; 69–75 kg			Middleweight; 71–80 kg
Middleweight; 145–158 lb (65.8–71.7 kg)	Middleweight; 140–158 lb (63.5–71.7 kg)	Middleweight; 147–160 lb (66.7–72.6 kg)	Middleweight; 67–73 kg	Light middleweight 67–71 kg			Middleweight; 69–75 kg			Welterweight; 63.5–71 kg
Middleweight; 145–158 lb (65.8–71.7 kg)	Middleweight; 140–158 lb (63.5–71.7 kg)	Middleweight; 147–160 lb (66.7–72.6 kg)	Middleweight; 67–73 kg	Light middleweight 67–71 kg			Welterweight; 64–69 kg		Welterweight; 63–69 kg	Welterweight; 63.5–71 kg
Middleweight; 145–158 lb (65.8–71.7 kg)	Middleweight; 140–158 lb (63.5–71.7 kg)	Middleweight; 147–160 lb (66.7–72.6 kg)	Welterweight; 62–67 kg	Welterweight; 63.5–67 kg			Welterweight; 64–69 kg		Welterweight; 63–69 kg	Welterweight; 63.5–71 kg
Middleweight; 145–158 lb (65.8–71.7 kg)	Middleweight; 140–158 lb (63.5–71.7 kg)	Welterweight; 135–147 lb (61.2–66.7 kg)	Welterweight; 62–67 kg	Welterweight; 63.5–67 kg			Welterweight; 64–69 kg		Welterweight; 63–69 kg	Welterweight; 63.5–71 kg
Welterweight; 135–145 lb (61.2–65.8 kg)	Middleweight; 140–158 lb (63.5–71.7 kg)	Welterweight; 135–147 lb (61.2–66.7 kg)	Welterweight; 62–67 kg	Welterweight; 63.5–67 kg			Welterweight; 64–69 kg		Welterweight; 63–69 kg	Welterweight; 63.5–71 kg
Welterweight; 135–145 lb (61.2–65.8 kg)	Middleweight; 140–158 lb (63.5–71.7 kg)	Welterweight; 135–147 lb (61.2–66.7 kg)	Welterweight; 62–67 kg	Welterweight; 63.5–67 kg			Light welterweight 60–64 kg		Welterweight; 63–69 kg	Welterweight; 63.5–71 kg
Welterweight; 135–145 lb (61.2–65.8 kg)	Lightweight; 126–140 lb (57.2–63.5 kg)	Welterweight; 135–147 lb (61.2–66.7 kg)	Welterweight; 62–67 kg	Light welterweight 60–63.5 kg			Light welterweight 60–64 kg		Welterweight; 63–69 kg	Lightweight; 57–63.5 kg
Welterweight; 135–145 lb (61.2–65.8 kg)	Lightweight; 126–140 lb (57.2–63.5 kg)	Welterweight; 135–147 lb (61.2–66.7 kg)	Welterweight; 62–67 kg	Light welterweight 60–63.5 kg			Light welterweight 60–64 kg		Lightweight; 57–63 kg	Lightweight; 57–63.5 kg
Welterweight; 135–145 lb (61.2–65.8 kg)	Lightweight; 126–140 lb (57.2–63.5 kg)	Welterweight; 135–147 lb (61.2–66.7 kg)	Lightweight; 58–62 kg	Light welterweight 60–63.5 kg			Light welterweight 60–64 kg		Lightweight; 57–63 kg	Lightweight; 57–63.5 kg
Lightweight; 125–135 lb (56.7–61.2 kg)	Lightweight; 126–140 lb (57.2–63.5 kg)	Lightweight; 126–135 lb (57.2–61.2 kg)	Lightweight; 58–62 kg	Light welterweight 60–63.5 kg			Light welterweight 60–64 kg		Lightweight; 57–63 kg	Lightweight; 57–63.5 kg
Lightweight; 125–135 lb (56.7–61.2 kg)	Lightweight; 126–140 lb (57.2–63.5 kg)	Lightweight; 126–135 lb (57.2–61.2 kg)	Lightweight; 58–62 kg	Lightweight; 57–60 kg				Lightweight; 56–60 kg	Lightweight; 57–63 kg	Lightweight; 57–63.5 kg
Lightweight; 125–135 lb (56.7–61.2 kg)	Lightweight; 126–140 lb (57.2–63.5 kg)	Lightweight; 126–135 lb (57.2–61.2 kg)	Featherweight; 54–58 kg	Lightweight; 57–60 kg				Lightweight; 56–60 kg	Lightweight; 57–63 kg	Lightweight; 57–63.5 kg
Lightweight; 125–135 lb (56.7–61.2 kg)	Featherweight; 116–126 lb (52.6–57.2 kg)	Featherweight; 118 (Note: The division between Bantamweight and Featherweight was moved from 118 lb to 119 lb for 1932–1936.)–126 lb (53.5–57.2 kg)	Featherweight; 54–58 kg	Lightweight; 57–60 kg				Lightweight; 56–60 kg	Lightweight; 57–63 kg	Lightweight; 57–63.5 kg
Lightweight; 125–135 lb (56.7–61.2 kg)	Featherweight; 116–126 lb (52.6–57.2 kg)	Featherweight; 118–126 lb (53.5–57.2 kg)	Featherweight; 54–58 kg	Featherweight; 54–57 kg				Lightweight; 56–60 kg	Featherweight; 52–57 kg	Featherweight; 51–57 kg
Featherweight; 115–125 lb (52.2–56.7 kg)	Featherweight; 116–126 lb (52.6–57.2 kg)	Featherweight; 118–126 lb (53.5–57.2 kg)	Featherweight; 54–58 kg	Featherweight; 54–57 kg				Lightweight; 56–60 kg	Featherweight; 52–57 kg	Featherweight; 51–57 kg
Featherweight; 115–125 lb (52.2–56.7 kg)	Featherweight; 116–126 lb (52.6–57.2 kg)	Featherweight; 118–126 lb (53.5–57.2 kg)	Featherweight; 54–58 kg	Featherweight; 54–57 kg				Bantamweight; 52–56 kg	Featherweight; 52–57 kg	Featherweight; 51–57 kg
Featherweight; 115–125 lb (52.2–56.7 kg)	Featherweight; 116–126 lb (52.6–57.2 kg)	Featherweight; 118–126 lb (53.5–57.2 kg)	Bantamweight; 51–54 kg					Bantamweight; 52–56 kg	Featherweight; 52–57 kg	Featherweight; 51–57 kg
Featherweight; 115–125 lb (52.2–56.7 kg)	Featherweight; 116–126 lb (52.6–57.2 kg)	Bantamweight; 112–118 lb (50.8–53.5 kg)	Bantamweight; 51–54 kg					Bantamweight; 52–56 kg	Featherweight; 52–57 kg	Featherweight; 51–57 kg
Featherweight; 115–125 lb (52.2–56.7 kg)	Bantamweight –116 lb (–52.6 kg)	Bantamweight; 112–118 lb (50.8–53.5 kg)	Bantamweight; 51–54 kg					Bantamweight; 52–56 kg	Featherweight; 52–57 kg	Featherweight; 51–57 kg
Bantamweight; 105–115 lb (47.6–52.2 kg)	Bantamweight –116 lb (–52.6 kg)	Bantamweight; 112–118 lb (50.8–53.5 kg)	Bantamweight; 51–54 kg					Bantamweight; 52–56 kg	Featherweight; 52–57 kg	Featherweight; 51–57 kg
Bantamweight; 105–115 lb (47.6–52.2 kg)	Bantamweight –116 lb (–52.6 kg)	Bantamweight; 112–118 lb (50.8–53.5 kg)	Bantamweight; 51–54 kg					Flyweight; 49–52 kg	Flyweight; 48–52 kg	Featherweight; 51–57 kg
Bantamweight; 105–115 lb (47.6–52.2 kg)	Bantamweight –116 lb (–52.6 kg)	Bantamweight; 112–118 lb (50.8–53.5 kg)	Flyweight –51 kg		Flyweight; 48–51 kg			Flyweight; 49–52 kg	Flyweight; 48–52 kg	Flyweight –51 kg
Bantamweight; 105–115 lb (47.6–52.2 kg)	Bantamweight –116 lb (–52.6 kg)	Flyweight –112 lb (–50.8 kg)	Flyweight –51 kg		Flyweight; 48–51 kg			Flyweight; 49–52 kg	Flyweight; 48–52 kg	Flyweight –51 kg
Bantamweight; 105–115 lb (47.6–52.2 kg)	Bantamweight –116 lb (–52.6 kg)	Flyweight –112 lb (–50.8 kg)	Flyweight –51 kg		Flyweight; 48–51 kg			Light flyweight 46–49 kg	Flyweight; 48–52 kg	Flyweight –51 kg
Bantamweight; 105–115 lb (47.6–52.2 kg)	Bantamweight –116 lb (–52.6 kg)	Flyweight –112 lb (–50.8 kg)	Flyweight –51 kg		Light-Flyweight –48 kg			Light flyweight 46–49 kg	Flyweight; 48–52 kg	Flyweight –51 kg
Flyweight –105 lb (–47.6 kg)	Bantamweight –116 lb (–52.6 kg)	Flyweight –112 lb (–50.8 kg)	Flyweight –51 kg		Light-Flyweight –48 kg			Light flyweight 46–49 kg	Flyweight; 48–52 kg	Flyweight –51 kg
7	5	8	8	10	11	12	11	10	8	7

Women's weight classes
1904	2012–2016	2020	2024
demonstration bout	Middleweight; 69–75 kg		Middleweight; 66–75 kg
demonstration bout	—N/a	Welterweight; 64–69 kg	
demonstration bout	—N/a	Welterweight; 64–69 kg	Welterweight; 60–66 kg
demonstration bout	Lightweight; 57–60 kg		
demonstration bout	—N/a	Featherweight; 54–57 kg	
demonstration bout	—N/a	—N/a	Bantamweight; 50–54 kg
demonstration bout	Flyweight; 48–51 kg		
demonstration bout	Flyweight; 48–51 kg		Flyweight −50 kg
—N/a	3	5	6

== Medal table ==
The following table is ranked by the number of golds, then silvers, then bronzes. Until 1948, losing semi-finalists held a bronze medal playoff; since 1952, both losing semi-finalists have received bronze medals.

As of the 2024 Summer Olympics, considering stripped and reallocated medals as of 31 December 2021.

Rank	Nation	Gold	Silver	Bronze	Total
1	United States	50	27	41	118
2	Cuba	42	19	19	80
3	Great Britain	20	15	28	63
4	Italy	15	15	18	48
5	Soviet Union	14	19	18	51
6	Russia	10	5	15	30
7	Hungary	10	2	8	20
7	Uzbekistan	10	2	8	20
9	Poland	8	10	26	44
10	Kazakhstan	7	8	11	26
11	Argentina	7	7	10	24
12	France	6	11	11	28
13	China	6	7	6	19
14	South Africa	6	4	9	19
15	Bulgaria	5	5	10	20
16	Ukraine	5	4	7	16
17	East Germany	5	2	6	13
18	Germany	4	9	11	24
19	Ireland	4	5	10	19
20	Thailand	4	4	8	16
21	South Korea	3	7	11	21
22	Canada	3	7	8	18
23	Yugoslavia	3	2	6	11
24	Czechoslovakia	3	1	2	6
25	Japan	3	0	5	8
26	Mexico	2	4	8	14
27	North Korea	2	3	4	9
28	Brazil	2	2	5	9
29	Finland	2	1	13	16
30	Algeria	2	0	5	7
31	Romania	1	9	15	25
32	Denmark	1	5	6	12
33	Turkey	1	5	4	10
34	United Team of Germany	1	3	2	6
34	Venezuela	1	3	2	6
36	Netherlands	1	2	5	8
37	Mongolia	1	2	4	7
38	Norway	1	2	2	5
39	Kenya	1	1	5	7
40	ROC	1	1	4	6
41	Belgium	1	1	2	4
41	New Zealand	1	1	2	4
43	West Germany	1	0	5	6
44	Chinese Taipei	1	0	3	4
44	Dominican Republic	1	0	3	4
46	Sweden	0	5	6	11
47	Philippines	0	4	6	10
48	Nigeria	0	3	3	6
48	Spain	0	3	3	6
50	Uganda	0	3	1	4
51	Azerbaijan	0	2	8	10
52	Belarus	0	2	0	2
53	Australia	0	1	6	7
54	Puerto Rico	0	1	5	6
55	Colombia	0	1	4	5
56	Egypt	0	1	3	4
56	Ghana	0	1	3	4
58	Chile	0	1	2	3
59	Cameroon	0	1	1	2
59	Unified Team	0	1	1	2
61	Australasia	0	1	0	1
61	Czech Republic	0	1	0	1
61	Estonia	0	1	0	1
61	Kyrgyzstan	0	1	0	1
61	Panama	0	1	0	1
61	Tonga	0	1	0	1
67	Morocco	0	0	4	4
68	India	0	0	3	3
69	Armenia	0	0	2	2
69	Georgia	0	0	2	2
69	Moldova	0	0	2	2
69	Tajikistan	0	0	2	2
69	Tunisia	0	0	2	2
74	Bermuda	0	0	1	1
74	Cape Verde	0	0	1	1
74	Croatia	0	0	1	1
74	Guyana	0	0	1	1
74	Lithuania	0	0	1	1
74	Mauritius	0	0	1	1
74	Niger	0	0	1	1
74	Pakistan	0	0	1	1
74	Refugee Olympic Team	0	0	1	1
74	Syria	0	0	1	1
74	Uruguay	0	0	1	1
74	Zambia	0	0	1	1
Totals (85 entries)		278	278	492	1,048

== Nations ==
Nation	96	00	04	08	12	20	24	28	32	36	48	52	56	60	64	68	72	76	80	84	88	92	96	00	04	08	12	16	20	24	Years
Afghanistan																			3						1		1				3
Algeria																2	1		2	7	6	8	6	7	7	7	8	8	8	5	14
American Samoa																					2	2	1								3
Andorra																		1													1
Angola																			3		3	1									3
Antigua and Barbuda																					2								1		2
Argentina						1	10	8	8	8	8	10	10	10	10	8	5	3		6	4	3	5	7	1	1	2	6	4		23
Armenia																							4	3	1	4	1	5	3	1	8
Aruba																					2										1
Australasia				1																											1
Australia							3			3	7	5	9	10	10	4	4	4	2	5	4	6	8	9	9	9	11	3	5	12	22
Austria							3	1		6	5	4	1	5	3	2	1	2	1	2	1										14
Azerbaijan																							2	5	9	2	8	11	5	5	8
Bahamas																	2			3	1					1			1		5
Barbados																				2	2	2	2	1							5
Belarus																							5	1	6	4	3	3	4		7
Belgium						13	10	6		8	8	5	1	4				1				1								3	11
Belize																				1											1
Benin																	2		7	3							1				4
Bermuda																	1	2			1										3
Bolivia																				1											1
Botswana																					2	1	1	1	2	2	1		2		8
Brazil											3	6	2	5	3	2	2	4	4		3	4	6	6	5	6	10	9	7	10	19
Bulgaria												4	2	6	6	9	9	11	11		11	7	6	3	5	2	4	3	3	5	18
Burkina Faso																					2		1	1					1		4
Burundi																													1		1
Cambodia															4		1														2
Cameroon																4	3		4	6	4		4	2	3	3	5	4	3		12
Canada						8	9	7	7	4	7	7	6	4	4	4	5	9		10	10	10	11	7	5	1	3	3	5	2	24
Cape Verde																									1			1	1	2	4
Central African Republic																				2	2					1		1			4
Chad																	1														1
Chile							4	4		4	5		3	3	4	6	3					1	1								11
China																					2	4	3	3	6	10	9	11	6	8	10
Chinese Taipei													1	2	7	3	1			2	2		1					2	4	6	11
Colombia																	7	5		5	2	3	4	3	5	5	3	5	6	5	13
Republic of the Congo																			3												1
Cook Islands																					3										1
Costa Rica																2					1										2
Ivory Coast															3					3	2										3
Croatia																						1	1		2	2		2	2	1	7
Cuba														1	6	11	11	11	11			12	12	12	11	10	8	10	7	5	15
Czechoslovakia								3		8	5	5	5	3	5	5	2		3		3	4									12
Czech Republic																							4	2			1				3
Denmark				2		12	8	6	2	8	6	5	3	5	4	2	3	3	3		5	4	2				1			1	20
Dominican Republic																2		6	1	6	5	6	6	3	5	6	3	2	7	3	14
Democratic Republic of the Congo																				6	5	1				1	1		4	2	7
East Germany																8	8	8	10		11										5
Ecuador																2	1		3		1		2		1	3	7	4	4	3	11
Egypt							1			4	5	7			8	5	6	3		6	4	3	4	7	6	3	5	4	2	3	19
El Salvador																					2								1		2
Estonia							1	1		2																					3
Swaziland																				3	2	1	1	1					1		6
Ethiopia															3	4	6		8				2	2	2						7
Federated States of Micronesia																												1			1
Fiji													2								2							1			3
Finland								3	2	6	6	10	3	7	5	5	4	5	5	5	3	1		1				1	1	1	19
France				7		15	16	8	6	6	8	10	6	8	4	6	6	6	2	4	4	5	7	8	6	9	5	11	6	8	26
Gabon																	1			2	1	1	2	1	2		2				8
The Gambia																										1					1
Georgia																							5	2	2	2			3	2	6
Germany								8	8	8		10										12	8	8	4	4	4	6	3	2	12
Ghana														6	7	7	6			6	4	5	2	4		6	3	1	3		13
Great Britain				32		16	16	8	3	8	8	10	7	10	8	9	9	7	9	12	8	10	2	2	1	7	10	12	11	6	26
Greece							1	2	1					2		3	4	3		2	1	1	2	3	6	2					14
Grenada																				4	4					1					3
Guam																					1										1
Guatemala																2				1	1	2				1					5
Guinea																			3		2		1	1							4
Guyana														1		2	2		4	3	3	2	1						1		9
Haiti																		3							1	1		1	1	1	6
Honduras																					2		2				1	1			4
Hong Kong															2																1
Hungary							1	4	2	6	6	9	2	6	5	6	6	8	9		9	8	5	3	5	5	3	2	1	3	23
India											7	4					3	2	3	2	3	5	3	4	4	5	8	3	9	6	16
Independent Olympic Athletes																								1							1
Indonesia														3			2	2		3	2	2	4	2	1						9
Iran											8	6		4	5		5	6				5	4	3	1	3	4	1	2		14
Iraq														2	2				7	3	3	2			1		1	1			9
Ireland							7	8	4		8	8	7	10	5	6	6	5	7	6	7	6	4	1	1	5	6	8	7	10	23
Israel																				2	3		1								3
Italy						5	16	7	8	8	8	10	8	10	10	11	8	6	4	7	7	5	5	6	6	6	7	7	4	8	25
Jamaica											1				2	3	1	3		3	4	2	3						1		10
Japan								2	5	5		2	3	5	9	4	4	6		7	7	4	3	2	1	2	4	2	5	2	21
Jordan																					2						1	2	5	3	5
Kazakhstan																							8	7	8	10	11	12	9	10	8
Kenya															5	4	8			10	12	5	5	4		4	2	3	4		11
Kosovo																													1	1	2
Kuwait																					3										1
Kyrgyzstan																							3	5	2	1		1		1	5
Laos																			6		2	1									3
Latvia							1															1	1								3
Lebanon											1	1					1		2	1	3										6
Lesotho																				2	3			2		1		2			5
Liberia																					4										1
Lithuania								2														4	1	2	2	3	2	2			8
Luxembourg							6	5		5	4	4		5																	6
Madagascar																			3	3		2	1	1	1	1					7
Malaysia															2								1								2
Malawi																	3			6	7										3
Mali																1			1	1	1									1	5
Mauritius																					1		3	3	1	2	2	2	2		8
Mexico								4	6	4	1	3		3	5	11	8	3	4	6	6	4	8	6	5	3	2	6	3	4	22
Moldova																							2	1	2	2	1				5
Mongolia																	9	6	7		7	6	3	1	1	4	4	6	3	2	13
Montenegro																										1	1			1	3
Morocco														7	2	5	3	5		4	7	7	6	5	7	10	8	10	7	3	16
Mozambique																					3		1				1		2	2	5
Myanmar											2	3	4	3	3	2	2			1											8
Namibia																						1	2	1	2	3	2	2	1		8
Nepal															4				3	3	5										4
Netherlands						8	9	6		8	6	5		3	4	2	2			2	2	5						3	2	1	16
New Zealand							1	2	3	3	1		2		2		2	2		2		3	1	1	1		2		1		16
Nicaragua																3	2	1	2	3		2					1				7
Niger															1	2	4			2	3						1				6
Nigeria														4	4	5	6		8	6	7	9	4	5	7	4	3	1		3	15
North Korea																	2	3	6			6	2	1	2	1	2			2	10
Norway						14	9	5		6	4	4		2		1	4			3		1	1							2	13
Oman																					2										1
Pakistan											3	4	6	4	4		2	2		4	2	4	4	4	5						13
Palestine																														1	1
Panama															1		2										1	1	1	1	5
Papua New Guinea																		2			2	5	4			1		1	1	1	8
Paraguay																				2	2										2
Peru											3					2	2						1						2		5
Philippines									4	5	5	5	5	1	6	5	4	3		3	6	6	5	4	4	1	1	2	4	5	24
Poland							5	4		7	6	10	9	10	10	11	11	11	11		7	8	4	5	3	2	1	2	4	5	22
Portugal																			1												1
Puerto Rico											3	3			1	6	6	10	3	11	10	8	7	5	5	5	5	1	1	2	18
Qatar																												2			1
Refugee Olympic Team																													2	2	2
Republic of China										2																					1
Rhodesia								2						4	1																3
Romania										4		10	4	9	9	9	11	11	11	6	2	5	6	10	3	2	2	1	2	1	20
Russia																							9	12	11	11	10	11	11		7 (Note: Russia's overall appearances include one as the Russian Olympic Committee in 2020.)
Saar												3																			1
Samoa																				4	7	3	2	1		1			2	1	8
Senegal																	4	1						1							3
Serbia																											1		1	3	3
Serbia and Montenegro																								1							1
Seychelles																			2	4		2	3		1		1	1			7
Sierra Leone																1			2	2	2		1			1					6
Singapore																	1														1
Slovakia																							2						1	1	3
Somalia																													1		1
South Africa						7	4	6	5	6	8	8	7	8								2	5	3	3	1	2				15
South Korea											3	4	5	6	8	7	6	6		9	12	11	9	9	7	5	2		2	2	18
South Yemen																					2										1
Solomon Islands																					1										1
Soviet Union												10	10	10	10	11	11	11	11		12										9
Spain							7	6			8			8	4	6	5	5		4	5	7	1	1		1	2	2	4	6	18
Sri Lanka											4	2	2	2	2	1										1					7
Sudan														3		3	5			4	5										5
Sweden							5	8	3	4	4	7	3	2		2	2	3	6	6	6	3	6		1	2	3	1	2	2	22
Switzerland						1	7			8	4	6		6	2	1	3														9
Syria																			8	2	3		2	2	1		1				7
Tajikistan																							1		1	3	4	1	3	3	7
Tanzania																1	8		9	6	4	5	2				1				8
Thailand													5	4	5	3	7	5		5	6	6	6	9	6	8	3	4	5	8	17
Togo																	2			3	3										3
Tonga																				7	3		2		1					1	5
Trinidad and Tobago																				2			1				1	1	1		5
Tunisia														5	2	4	3	1		3		3	4	5	5	5	5	2	2	1	15
Turkey																6	7	3		6	4	1	8	9	7	5	6	6	6	7	14
Turkmenistan																							1		2	1	2	1			5
Uganda														6	5	8	8		7	11	9	3	2	4	5	1		2	3		14
Ukraine																							7	11	6	7	7	5	5	3	8
Unified Team																						12									1
United Team of Germany													8	10	10																3
United Arab Republic														4																	1
United States			18			16	16	8	8	8	8	10	8	10	10	11	11	11		12	11	12	12	12	9	8	12	8	10	8	25
Uruguay							5			7	8	2		3	1	4	1	1		1	2	2									12
Uzbekistan																							7	10	9	7	6	11	11	11	8
Vanuatu																					1							1			2
Venezuela												5	2	3		4	7	10	9	3	6	3	2	4	7	6	3	8	4	2	18
Vietnam												2									2								2	2	4
Virgin Islands																	1	2		1		2	1			2		1			7
West Germany																8	9	6		8	6										5
Yugoslavia												3		4		5	3	7	9	7	7										8
Zambia															2	4	4		8	9	7	4	4	2	2	3	1	1	3	2	15
Zimbabwe																				3	3		2								3
No. of nations	-	-	1	4	-	12	27	29	18	31	39	43	34	54	56	65	80	54	51	81	106	78	97	75	72	77	77	74	81	68	
No. of boxers	-	-	18	42	-	116	181	144	85	179	205	249	161	281	269	307	354	266	271	354	432	336	355	307	280	283	283	286	289	248	
Year	96	00	04	08	12	20	24	28	32	36	48	52	56	60	64	68	72	76	80	84	88	92	96	00	04	08	12	16	20	24	

== See also ==
- List of Olympic medalists in boxing
- List of Olympic venues in boxing
- Boxing at the Youth Olympic Games
