= Rolf (company) =

Russian automotive company

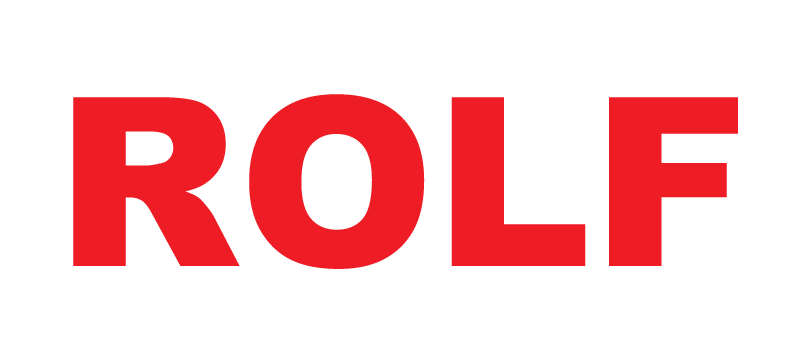
- Native name: Рольф
- Founded: (1991)
- Headquarters: Russian Federation, Moscow
- Key people: Alexey Gulyaev, CEO, Sergey Petrov (founder)
- Revenue: (▲246,197,796 thousand rubles(2020, IFRS))
- Operating income: ▲13,822,327 thousand rubles (2020, IFRS)
- Net income: ▲8,934,217 thousand rubles (2020, IFRS)
- Total assets: ▲56,648,461 thousand rubles (2020, IFRS)
- Total equity: ▲16,682,023 thousand rubles (2020, IFRS)
- Number of employees: over 8,000
- Website: www.rolf.ru

ROLF (Russian: Компания "РОЛЬФ") – the biggest dealer holding in the Russian Federation, one of the pioneers at the Russian automobile market. It was founded on August 5, 1991. Its headquarters is in Moscow city. The company is engages in selling of new cars and used cars, motorcycles, automobiles accessories, as well as service maintenance of cars and motorcycles and rendering of services in crediting and insurance.

== Management ==
The company is owned by Cyprus trusts, its beneficiaries are the family of the founder of the company, Mr. Sergey Petrov.

The CEO of the retail subdivision of Rolf since February 1, 2017, is Ms. Svetlana Vinogradova.

In November 2019, Sergey Petrov has announced the intention to sell the Rolf Company and the formation of the closed list of applicants for purchase of the car dealer. At the beginning of 2021 the management declared the refusal to sell the company.

In February 2021, the CEO of the company Ms. Svetlana Vinogradova declared that Rolf considers the possibility of transfer to the IPO and already started the preparation work. In December 2021, the CEO of Rolf Company confirmed to Bloomberg News the possibility of IPO in the second half of 2022.

In December 2023, Vladimir Putin signed a decree transferring Rolf shares under state control. In January 2024, the Prosecutor General's Office filed a lawsuit to nationalize the company, arguing that the owner of the holding violated the law by combining parliamentary activities with business management. On February 21, 2024, the Moskovsky District Court of St. Petersburg granted the claim. The shares will become the property of the state. Umar Kremlev, the head of the International Boxing Association, was announced on September 2, 2024, as the new owner of Rolf.

== Activity ==
The first dealer center of Rolf was opened in Moscow city in 1991. As on January 1, 2021, the retail subdivision includes 59 show-rooms, located in 20 districts (15 in Moscow and 5 in Saint-Petersburg). They represent 20 automobile brands and one motorcycle brand (Audi, BMW, BMW Motorrad, Chrysler, Ford, Genesis, Jeep, Jaguar, Hyundai, Kia, Land Rover/Range Rover, Lexus, Mazda, MercedesBenz, Mitsubishi, Nissan, Porsche, Renault, Skoda, Toyota, Volkswagen).

=== Performance indicator ===
Table No.1. The number of new cars and used cars sold in a year (to individuals and legal entities)

Year	New cars sold	Change by last year	Used car sold	Change by last year
2011	59 238	▲40%	9 826	▲10%
2012	67 847	▲15%	12 438	▲27%
2013	80 163	▲18%	18 153	▲46%
2014	91 693	▲14%	24 674	▲36%
2015	62 511	▼32%	22 419	▼9%
2016	72 640	▲16%	33 124	▲48%
2017	84 225	▲16%	48 158	▲45%
2018	96 670	▲15%	64 320	▲34%
2019	91 459	▼5%	68 294	▲6%
2020	79 986	▼13%	65 578	▼4%

== Bonds ==
Rolf Company has placed two bonded loans at the Moscow stock exchange.

The debut release and placement of bonds of the company took place in March 2019. Their volume was equal to 3 billion rubles with circulation period of 3 years and the rate of the coupon of 10.45% per annum.

In February 2020 Rolf placed the second issue of bonds for 4.5 billion rubles with circulation period of 2 years and the rate of the coupon of 9% per annum.

In December 2020 the Rolf Company placed offers on two issues of bonds with the total amount up to 7.5 billion rubles. The company has repaid the bonds shown to repayment for the amount of 1.8 billion rubles.

== Ratings and rankings ==
In July 2020 the Moody's rating agency has assigned the corporate rating (Corporate Family Rating CFR) to the Rolf Company at the level of "B1". The forecast for the rating is "stable".

In August 2020 the Expert RA rating agency has confirmed the rating of solvency of the non-financial company Rolf at the "ruA-“level. The forecast for the rating is “stable".

In 2020 Rolf took the following places in authoritative business rankings:

- Forbes: 200 largest private companies of Russia – 2020. Rolf – 38th place;
- 500: Rating of Russian businesses – 2020 – 62nd place;
- 50 most expensive Russian brands Brand Finance Russia 50 — 35th place.

The Rolf Company won the first place in the ranking of car dealers annually released by the “Auto Business Review” magazine:

- In terms of revenue – since 2013.
- In terms of sales of new cars – since 2014.
- In terms of used car sales – since 2013.

The "Dealer No. 1" in the spb-adlr.ru portal ranking in terms of sales of new cars in St. Petersburg city since 2011.
