= Boxing at the 2028 Summer Olympics =

Boxing at the Games of the XXXIV Olympiad
- Venue: Peacock Theater (preliminary phase); Crypto.com Arena (final phase); Los Angeles, California
- Dates: July 15–30, 2028
- No. of events: 14 (7 men, 7 women)
- Competitors: 248

The boxing competitions are set to be contested at the 2028 Summer Olympics in Los Angeles, California, United States. The venue for the prelims will be the Peacock Theater and the finals will be held at Crypto.com Arena.

The sport was at risk of being excluded from the Olympic program for the first time since 1912 after the suspension of the International Boxing Association in 2019 over governance and integrity issues, leading to the 2020 and 2024 editions having been organized by the International Olympic Committee, and the sport not having been included in the initial program of the 2028 Summer Olympics. IBA was then stripped of recognition by the IOC in June 2023. In May 2024, the new international organization, World Boxing, which was established a year before for the purpose of maintaining boxing as an Olympic sport, held its first formal meeting with the IOC. In March 2025, during the 144th IOC session, boxing was unanimously voted to be included in the 2028 games.

In April 2025, the IOC announced that one additional women's weight class would be added to boxing for parity with the men's events, bringing the total to 14 medal events.
