= Émile Grémaux =

French sportsperson and boxer

Émile Grémaux (1893 – 18 September 1959, in Lille) – boxer, coach and businessman. Long serving president of the French Boxing Federation. First president of International Amateur Boxing Association (AIBA) (1946–1959). Vice-president of the Olympic French Committee (1952–1959).

E. Grémaux was the champion of the Northern France in the weight of feather-cock in 1914.

He died at Lille, France, where he lived, at the age of 66, after a long illness.

Preceded by none	AIBA President; 1946 – 1959; Died	Succeeded by (United Kingdom) Lt. Colonel Rudyard H. Russell
