= List of Olympic venues in boxing =

For the Summer Olympics, there are 27 venues that have been or will be used for boxing.

Games	Venue	Other sports hosted at venues for those games	Capacity	Ref.
1904 St. Louis	Francis Gymnasium	Fencing	Not listed.	
1908 London	Northampton Institute	None	Not listed.	
1920 Antwerp	Antwerp Zoo	Wrestling	Not listed.	
1924 Paris	Vélodrome d'hiver	Cycling (track), Fencing, Weightlifting, Wrestling	10,884	
1928 Amsterdam	Krachtsportgebouw	Weightlifting, Wrestling	2,840	
1932 Los Angeles	Olympic Auditorium	Weightlifting, Wrestling	10,000.	
1936 Berlin	Deutschlandhalle	Weightlifting, Wrestling	8,630	
1948 London	Empire Pool	Diving, Swimming, Water polo (final)	12,500	
1948 London	Empress Hall, Earl's Court	Gymnastics, Weightlifting, Wrestling	19,000	
1952 Helsinki	Messuhalli	Basketball (final), Gymnastics, Weightlifting, Wrestling	5,500	
1956 Melbourne	West Melbourne Stadium	Basketball, Gymnastics	7,000	
1960 Rome	Palazzo dello Sport	Basketball (final)	15,000	
1964 Tokyo	Korakuen Ice Palace	None	4,500	
1968 Mexico City	Arena México	None	16,236	
1972 Munich	Boxhalle	Judo (final)	7,360	
1976 Montreal	Maurice Richard Arena	Wrestling	4,750	
1976 Montreal	Montreal Forum (final)	Basketball (final), Gymnastics, Handball (final), Volleyball (final)	18,000	
1980 Moscow	Indoor Stadium	Basketball (final)	16,500	
1984 Los Angeles	Los Angeles Memorial Sports Arena	None	15,700	
1988 Seoul	Jamsil Students' Gymnasium	None	7,500	
1992 Barcelona	Pavelló Club Joventut Badalona	None	Not listed.	
1996 Atlanta	Alexander Memorial Coliseum	None	10,000	
2000 Sydney	Sydney Convention and Exhibition Centre	Fencing, Judo, Weightlifting, Wrestling	7,500 (weightlifting), 9,000 (judo & wrestling), 10,000 (boxing & fencing)	
2004 Athens	Peristeri Olympic Boxing Hall	None	5,600	
2008 Beijing	Workers Indoor Arena	None	13,000	
2012 London	ExCeL	Fencing, Judo, Table tennis, Taekwondo, Weightlifting, Wrestling	Not listed.	
2016 Rio de Janeiro	Riocentro – Pavilion 6	None	6,500	
2020 Tokyo	Kokugikan Arena	None	10,000	
2024 Paris	Stade Roland Garros (finals)	Tennis	15,000	
2024 Paris	Arena Paris Nord	Modern pentathlon (fencing)	6,000	
2028 Los Angeles	Peacock Theater	Weightlifting	7,100	
2028 Los Angeles	Crypto.com Arena (finals)	Gymnastics (artistic, trampolining)	18,000	
2032 Brisbane	Moreton Bay Indoor Sports Centre	None	7,000	

== Gallery of venues ==
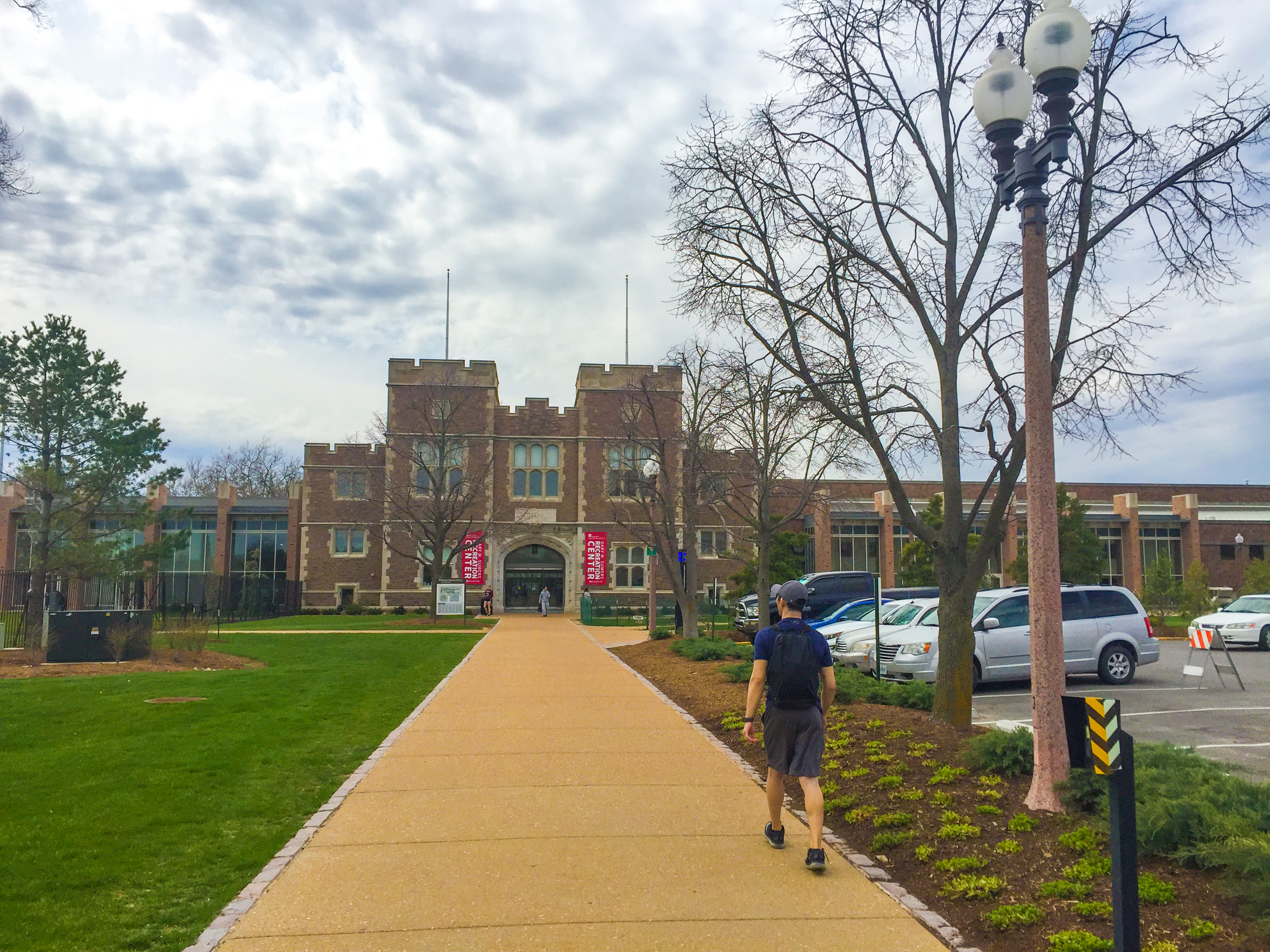
Francis Gymnasium hosted boxing at the 1904 Summer Olympics in St. Louis.

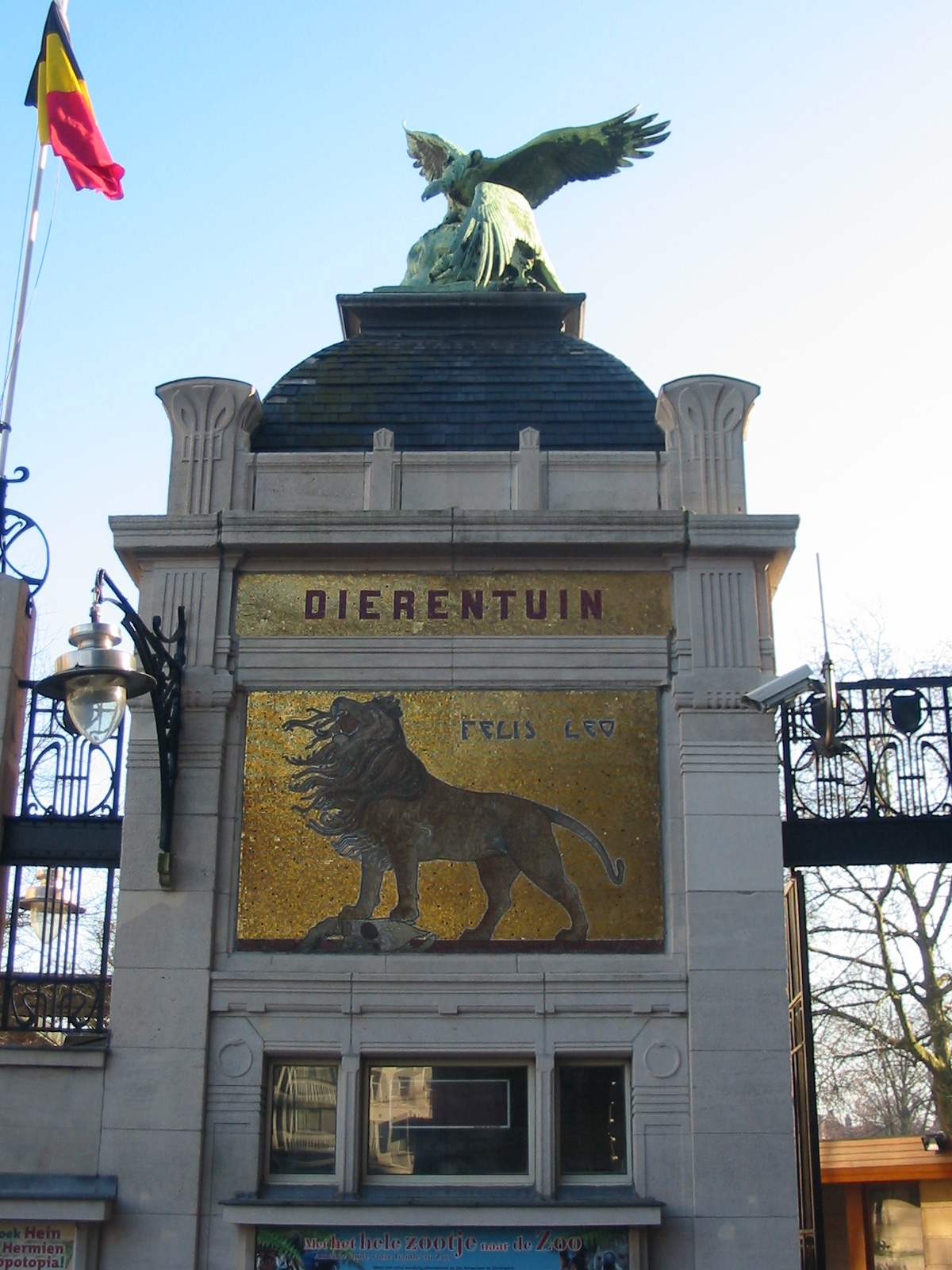
The Antwerp Zoo hosted boxing at the 1920 Summer Olympics.

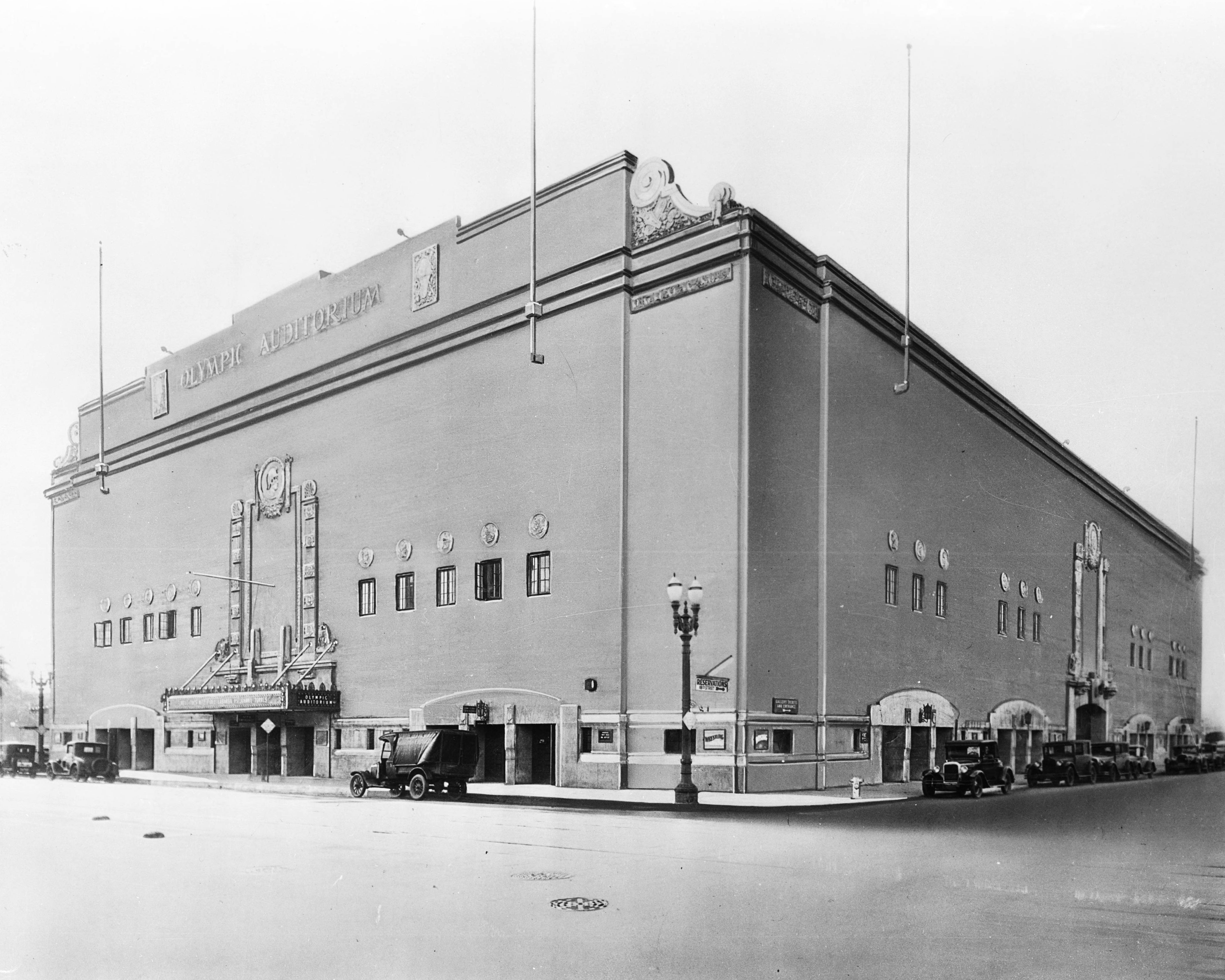
The Grand Olympic Auditorium hosted boxing at the 1932 Summer Olympics in Los Angeles.

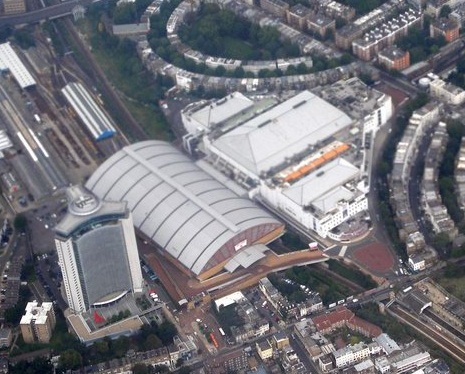
Empress Hall, Earls Court hosted boxing at the 1948 Summer Olympics in London.

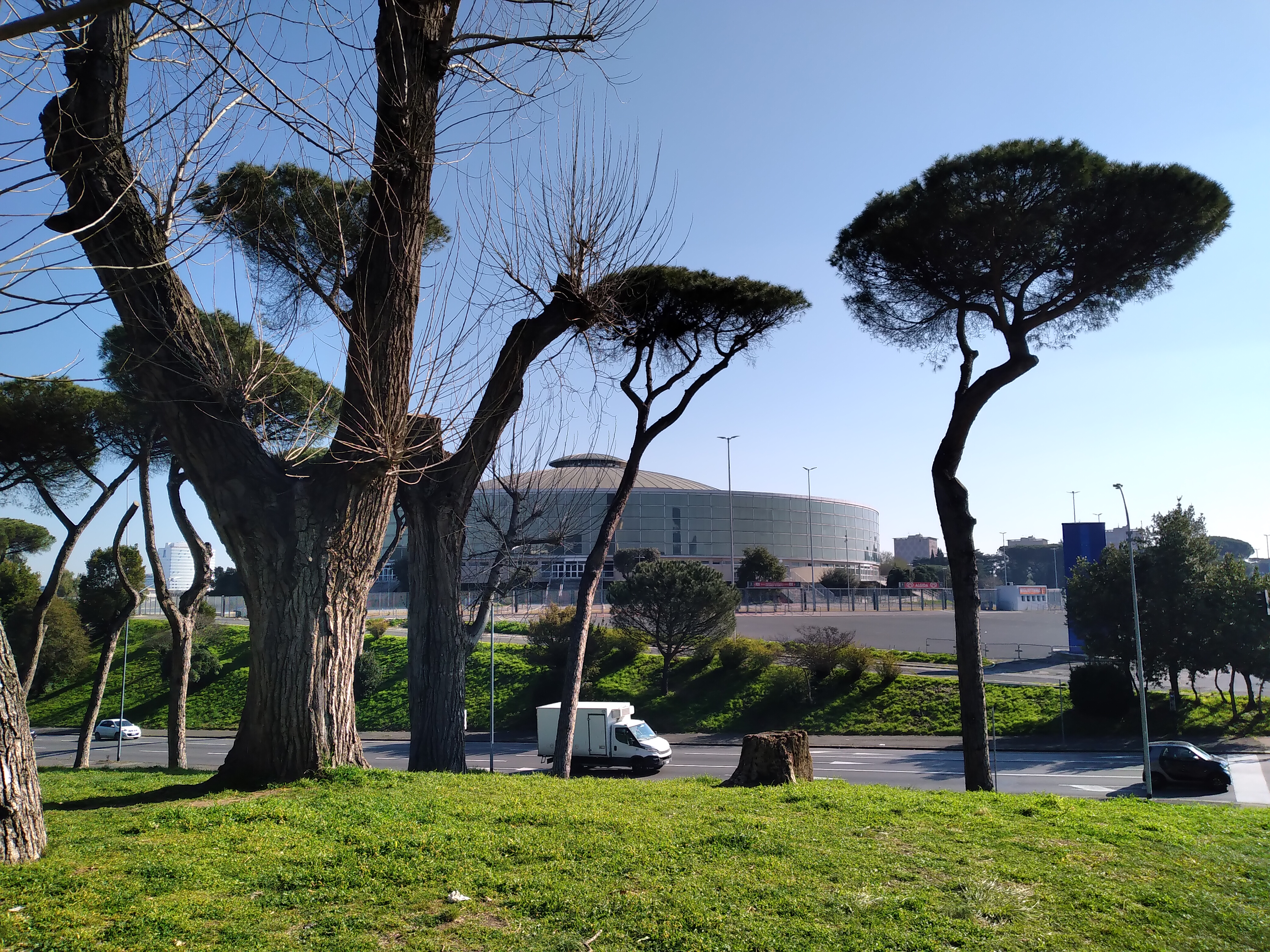
PalaLottomatica hosted boxing at the 1960 Summer Olympics in Rome.

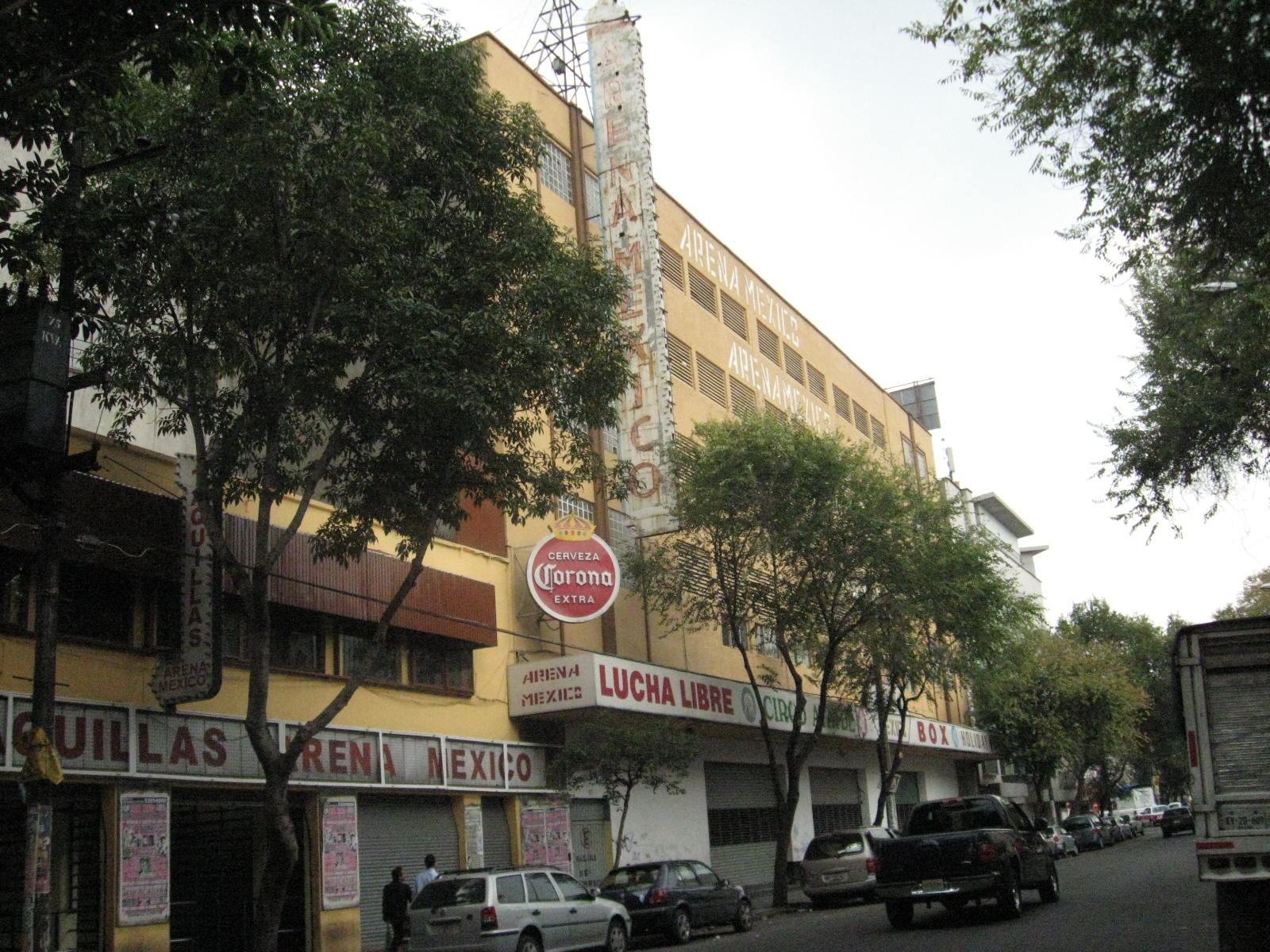
Arena Mexico hosted boxing at the 1968 Summer Olympics in Mexico City.

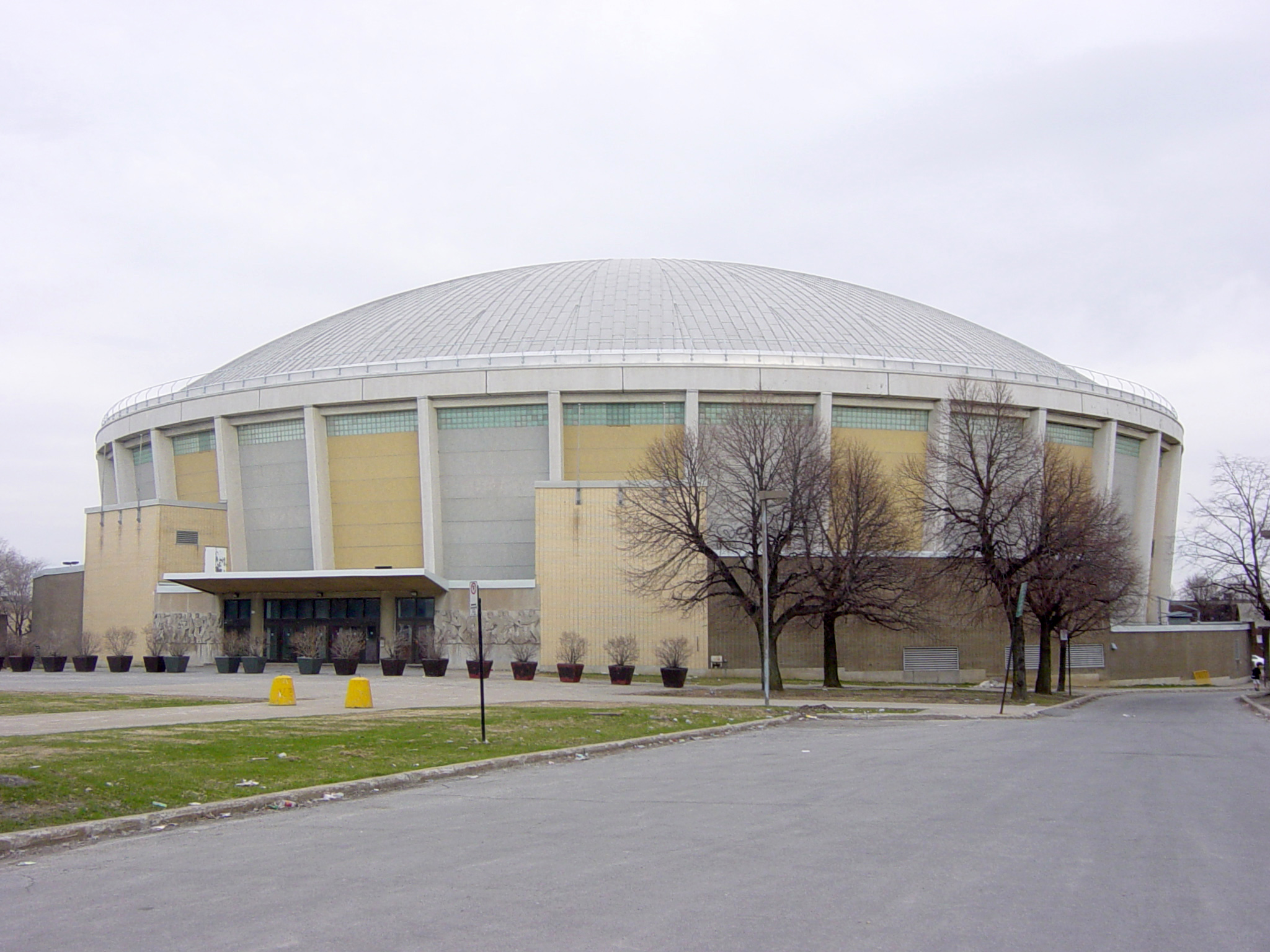
The Maurice Richard Arena hosted boxing at the 1976 Summer Olympics in Montreal.

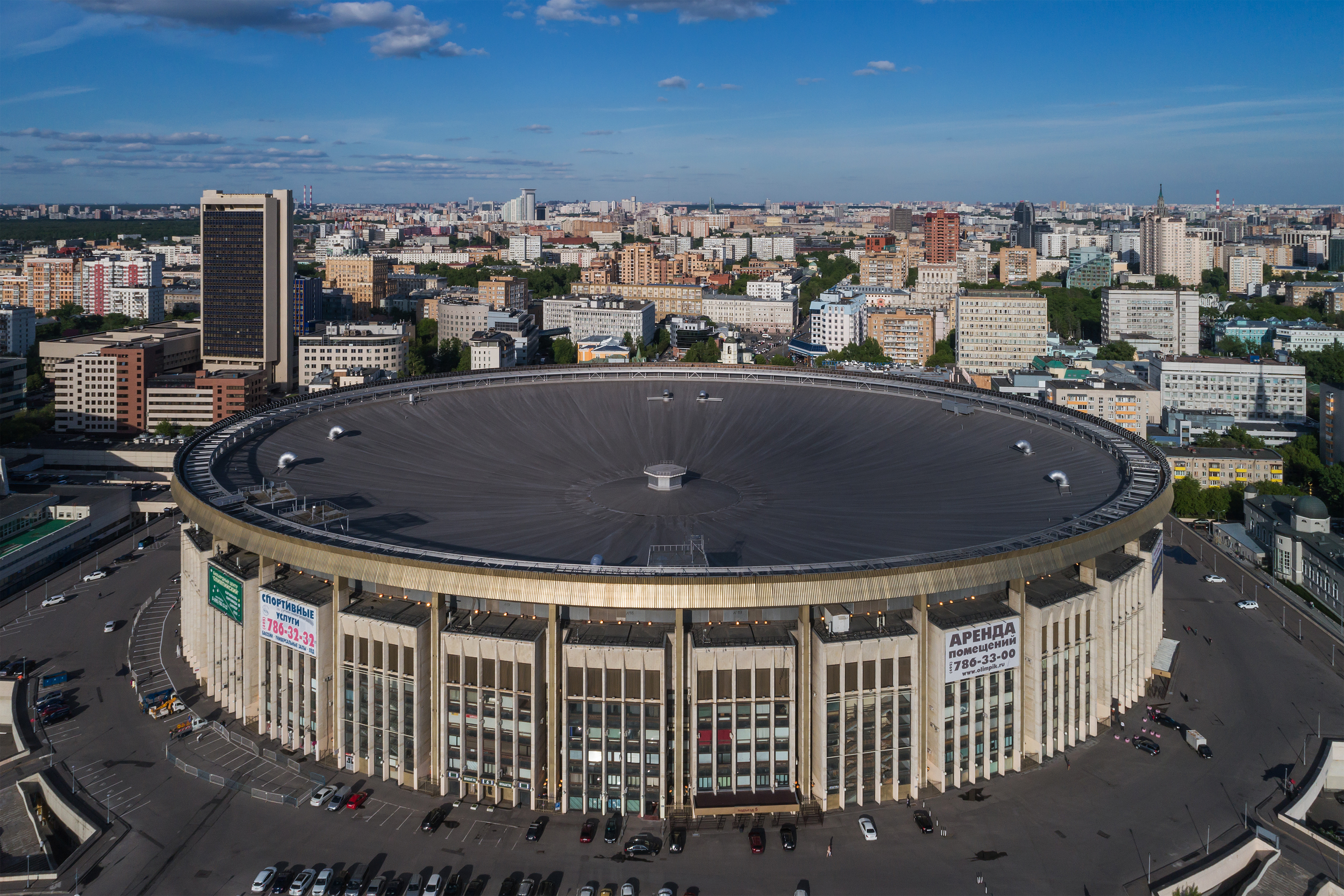
Olimpiyskiy hosted boxing at the 1980 Summer Olympics in Moscow.

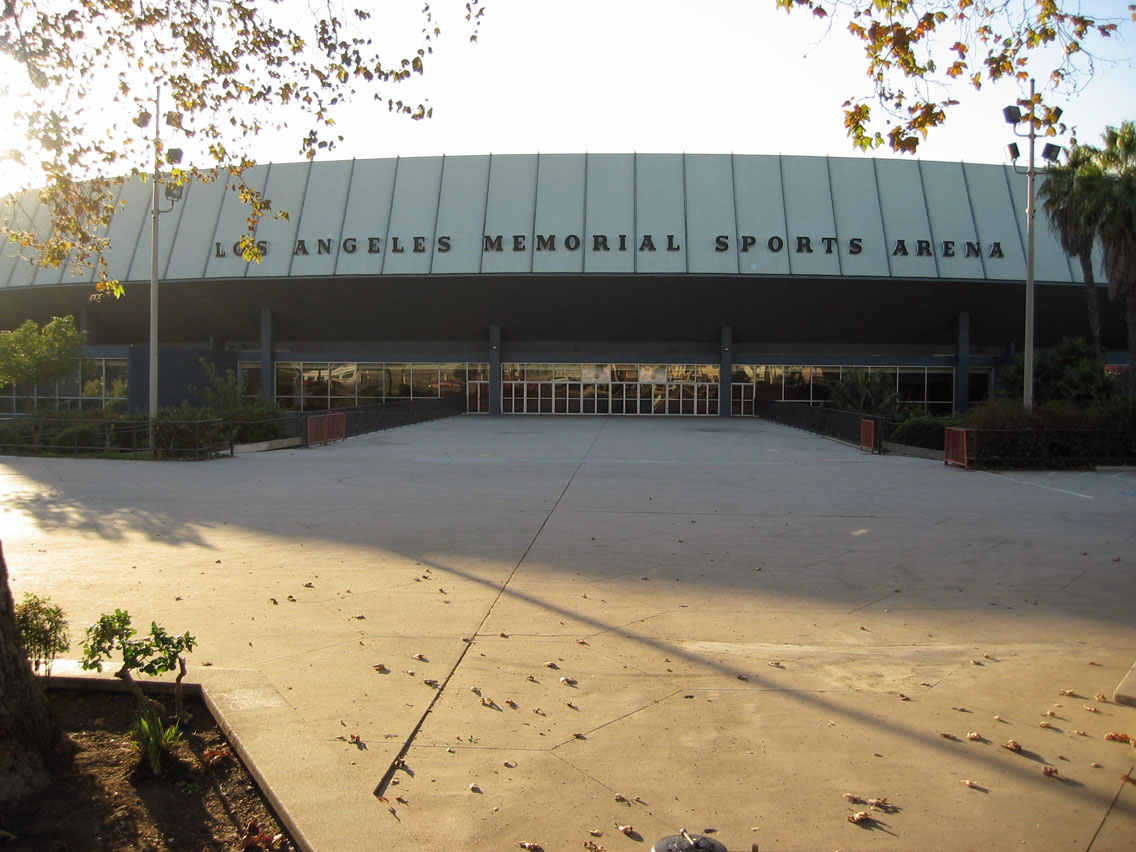
The Los Angeles Memorial Sports Arena hosted boxing at the 1984 Summer Olympics.

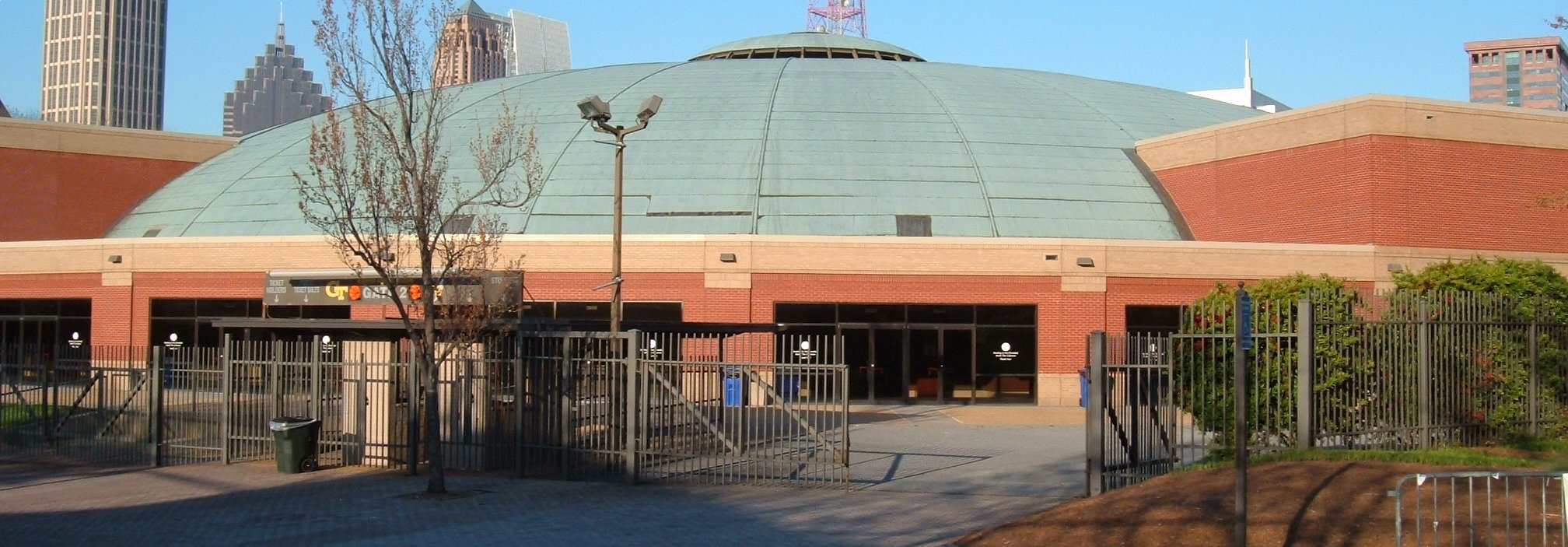
Alexander Memorial Coliseum hosted boxing at the 1996 Summer Olympics in Atlanta.

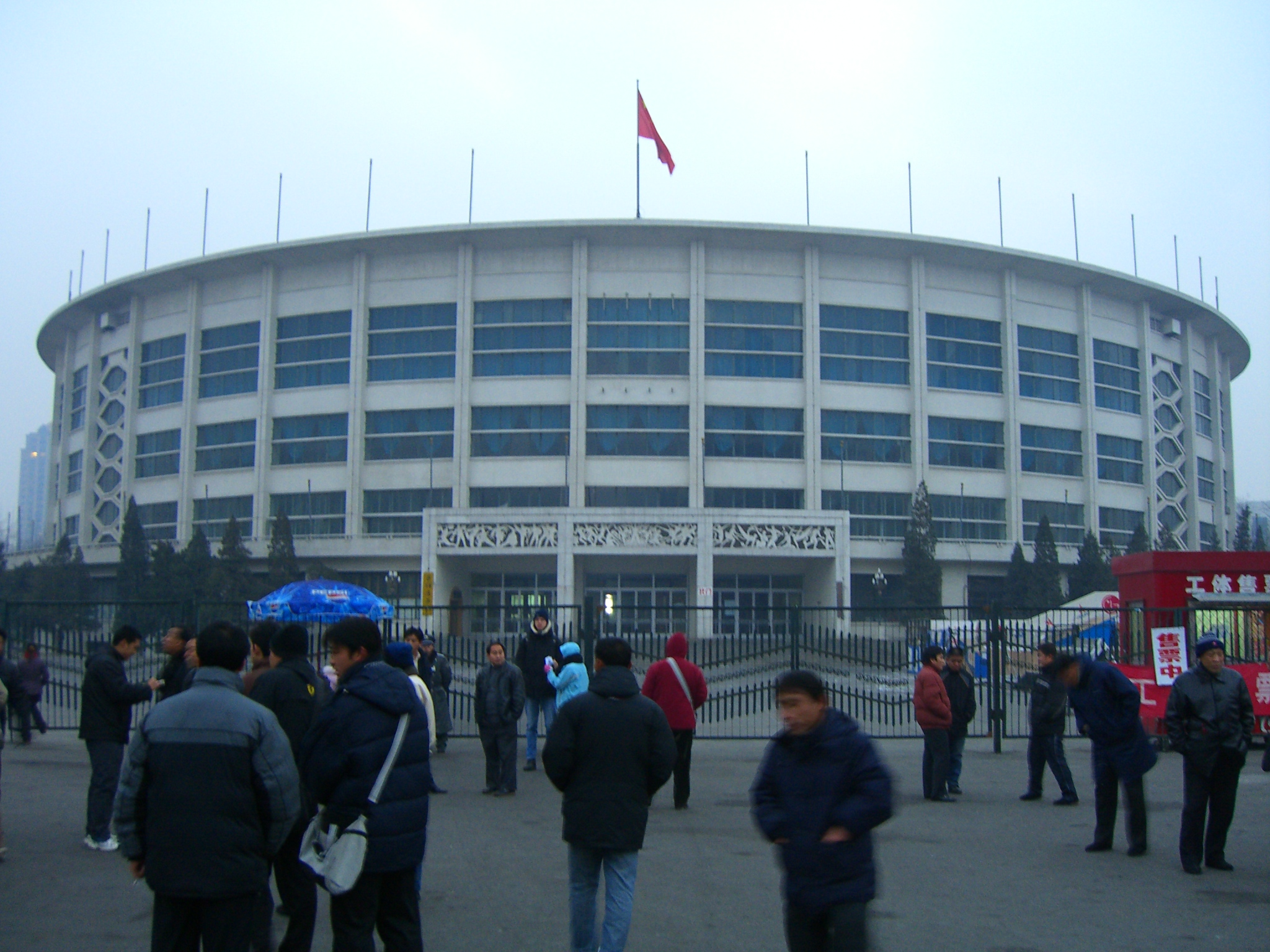
Workers' Gymnasium hosted boxing at the 2008 Summer Olympics in Beijing.

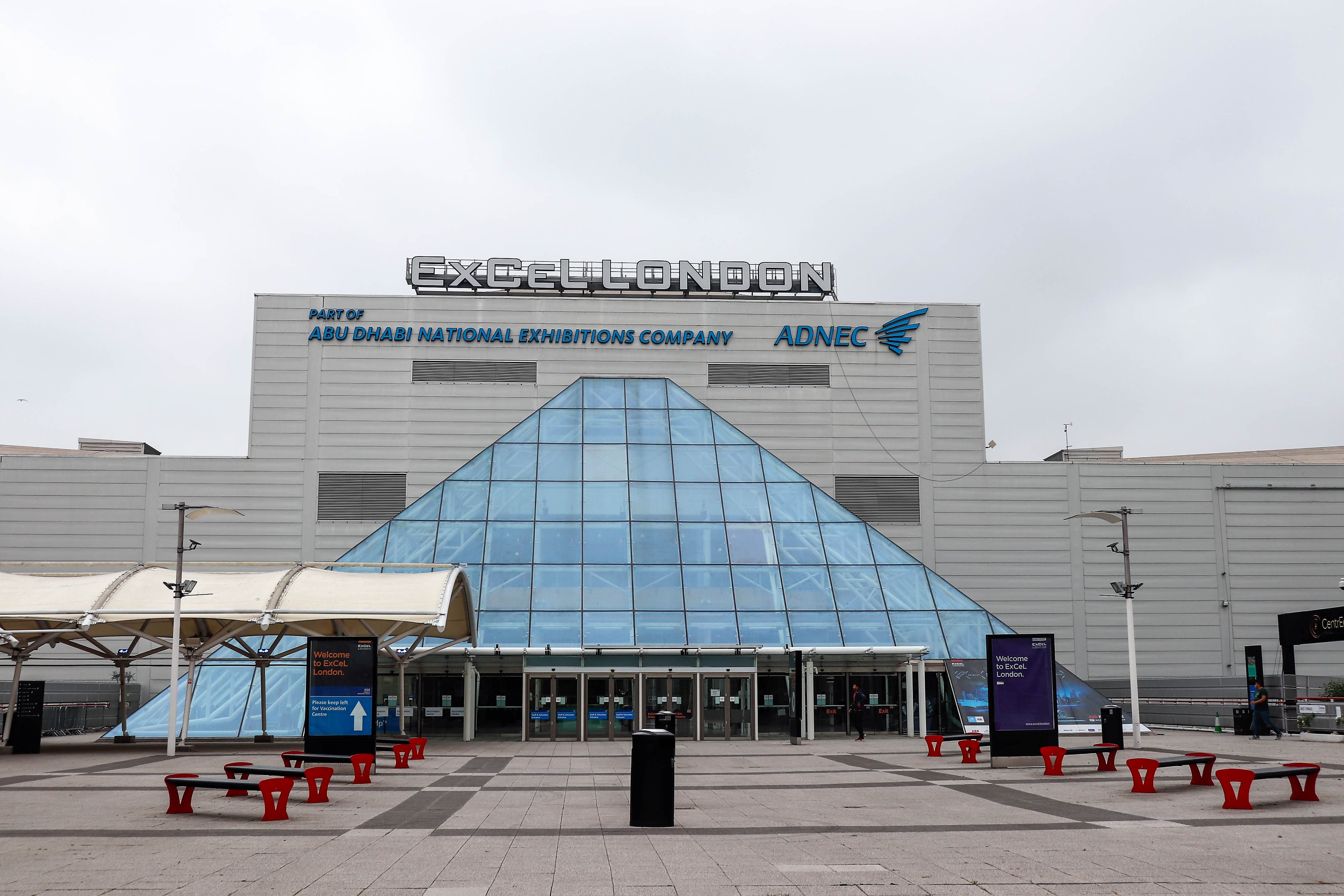
Excel London hosted boxing at the 2012 Summer Olympics.

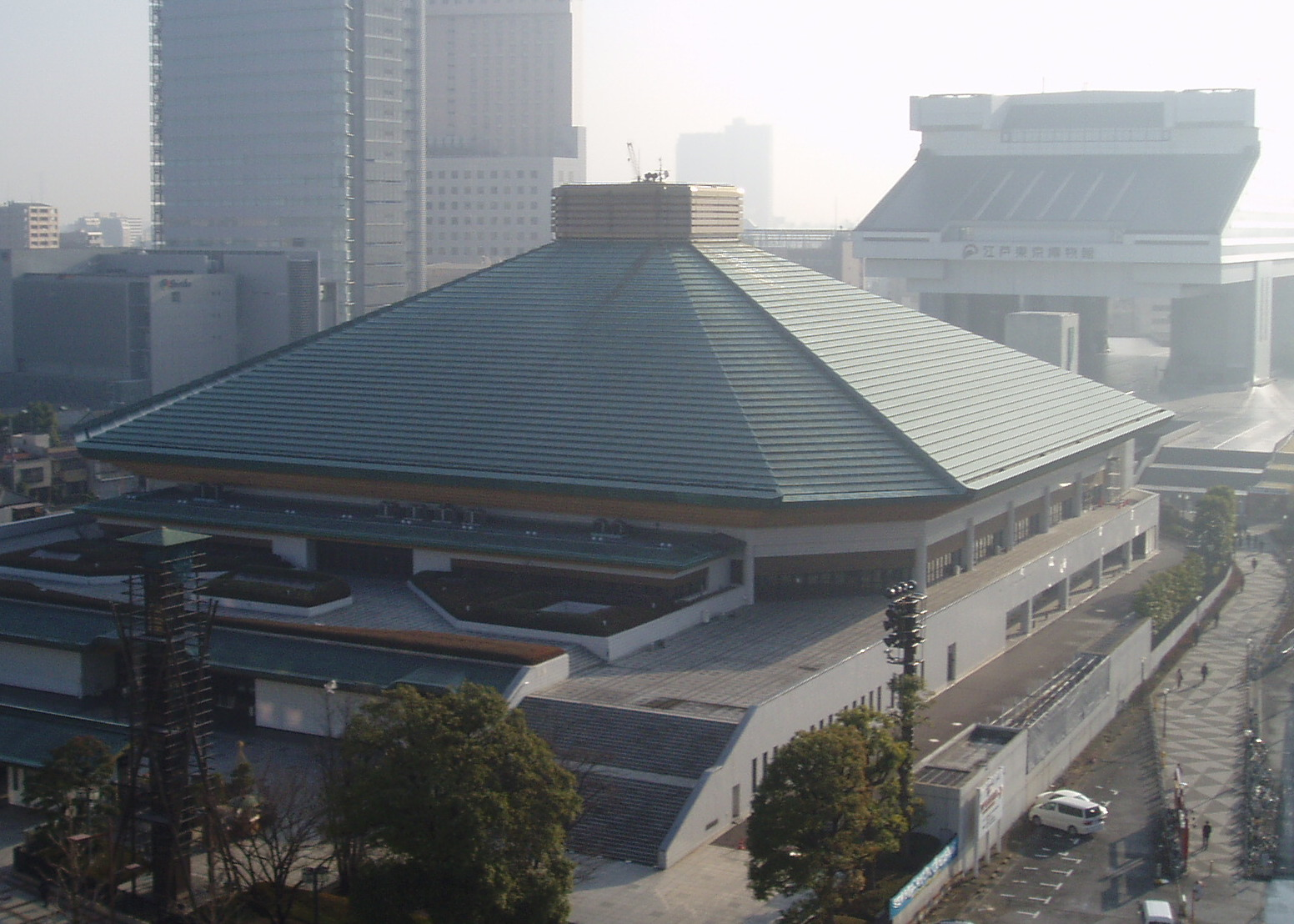
Ryōgoku Kokugikan hosted boxing at the 2020 Summer Olympics in Tokyo.

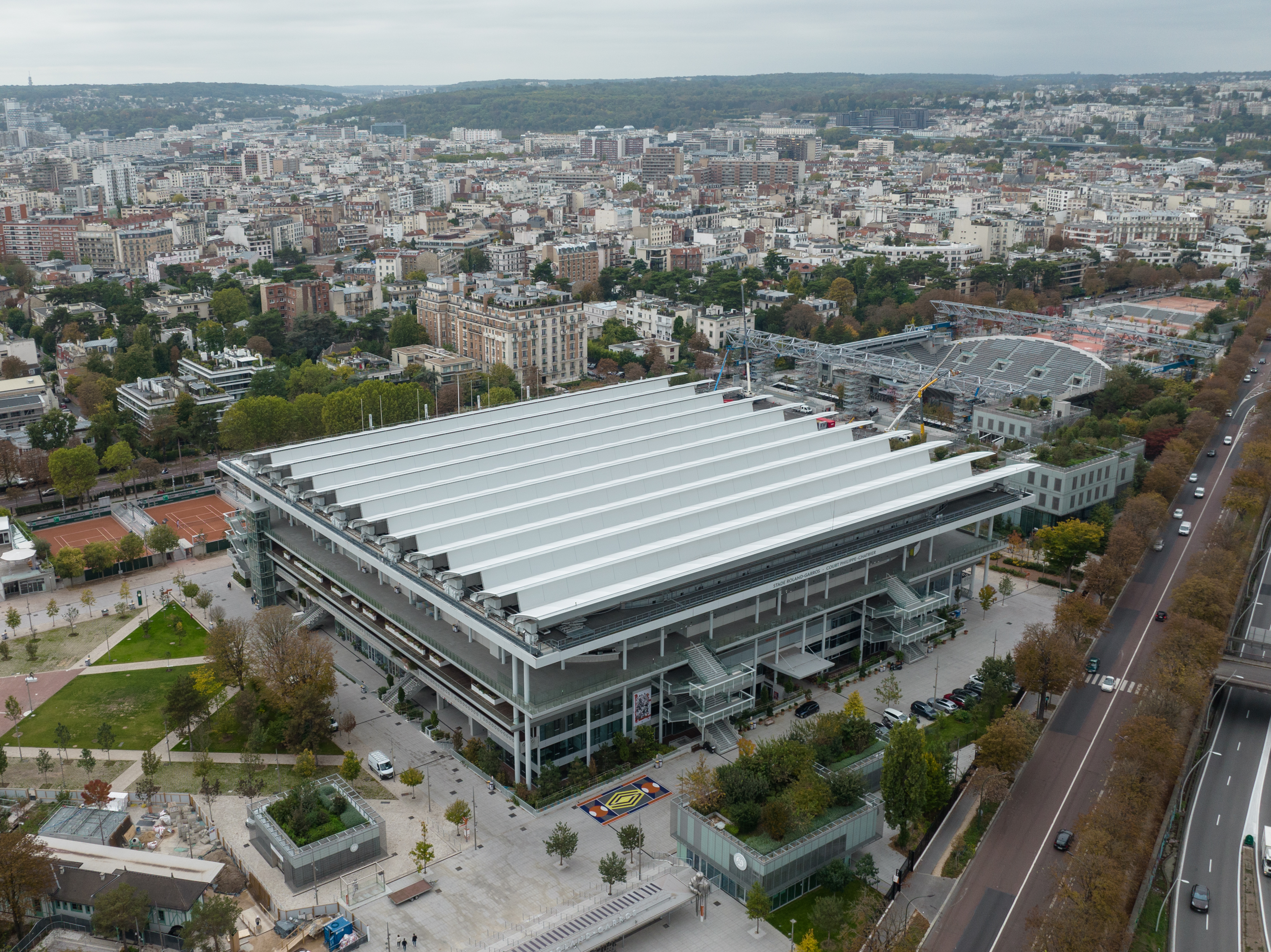
Stade Roland Garros hosted boxing finals at the 2024 Summer Olympics in Paris.

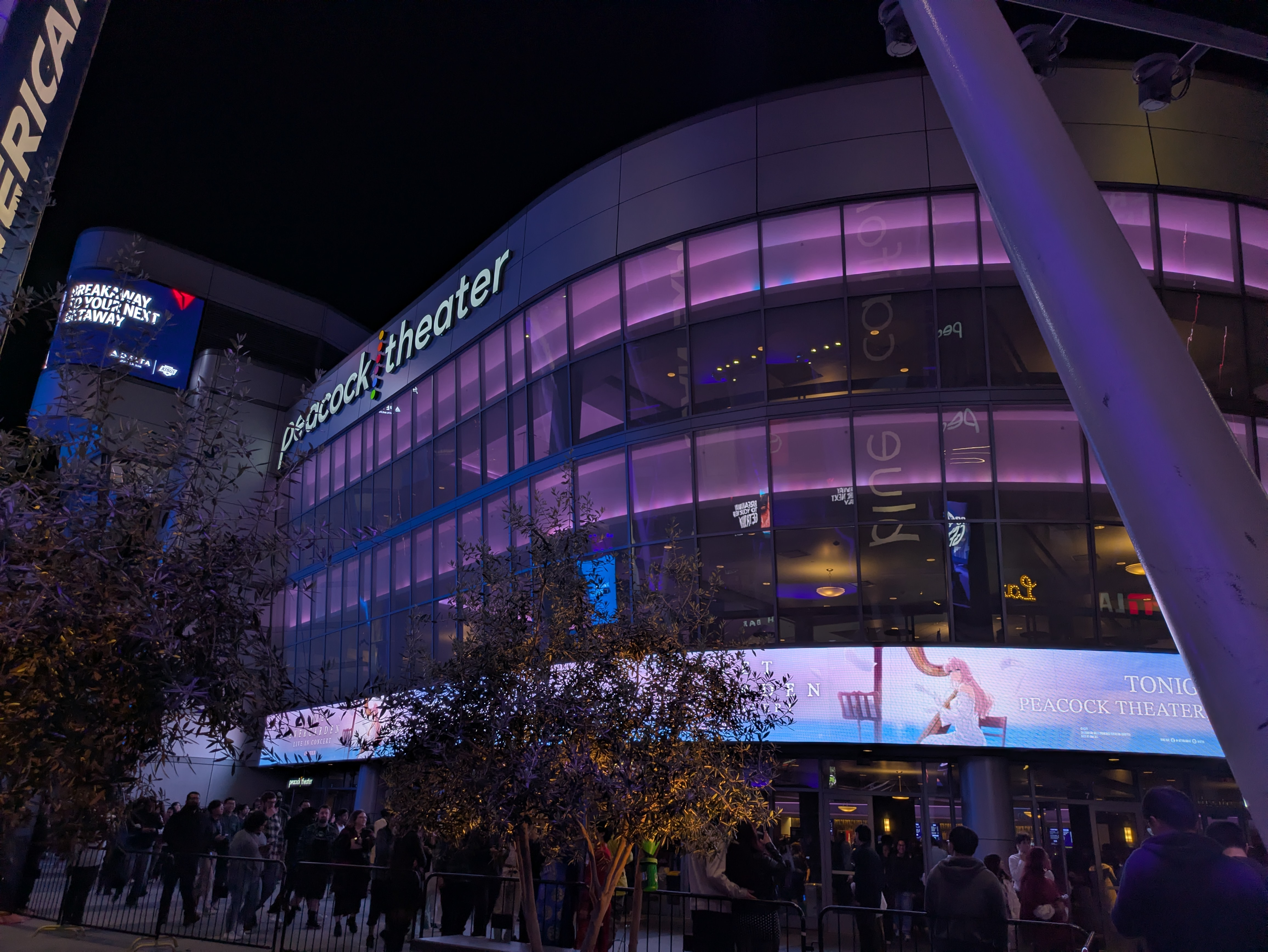
The Peacock Theater will host boxing at the 2028 Summer Olympics in Los Angeles.
