= Sergey Petrov (businessman) =

Russian politician and businessman (b. 1954)

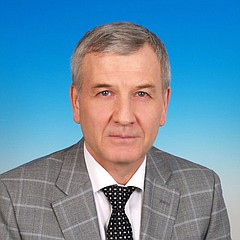
- Sergey Petrov

Deputy of the State Duma
- In office 2007–2016

Personal details
- Born: 1954 (age 71–72) Orenburg, USSR
- Occupation: politician, founder of the ROLF Group

Sergey Anatolyevich Petrov (Russian: Серге́й Анато́льевич Петро́в; born 1954, in Chkalov) is a Russian politician and businessman who is the founder of the ROLF Group. From 2007 to 2016 — deputy of the State Duma of the V and VI convocations, he was a member of the political party Spravedlivaya Rossiya. In 2016, after the termination of his deputy powers, he returned to work in the Rolf Group of companies — he was Chairman of the Board of Directors of ROLF Group until 2019.

== Biography ==
Sergey Petrov was born on August 16, 1954, in Chkalov (now Orenburg). After graduating from school in 1971 he entered The Higher Military Aviation School in Orenburg.

In 1975 he achieved the rank of an officer and special qualification of a pilot-engineer. He worked as an instructor in the Military Aviation School in Orenburg.

In 1982 he was dismissed from the Soviet Army at the rank of Major and expelled from The Communist Party of the Soviet Union for anti-Soviet propaganda and participation in secret democratic organizations.

In 1982-1987, he received a second higher education at the Correspondence Institute of Soviet Trade (now the Plekhanov Russian University of Economics), majoring in labor economics.

In 1989-1991 he was the director of the car rental department at Rozek-Car.

In August 1991 he founded his own company ROLF Group.

In 2004 he resigned as the President of the Company and handed control over to employed managers. He was still responsible for ROLF's long-term development strategy.

On December 2, 2007, he was elected to the State Duma on the lists of the political party Spravedlivaya Rossiya. On December 4, 2011, he was re-elected as a deputy of the State Duma from the Spravedlivaya Rossiya, as a member of the State Duma of the V and IV convocations, he was a member of the Committee on Budget and Taxes. On October 5, 2016, he ended his term as a deputy of the State Duma of the VI convocation.

As a deputy of the State Duma, he voted against the adoption of the Dima Yakovlev Law and the adoption of the «Yarovaya Package», he is known for his critical statements against the Russian government.

On June 27, 2019, police searches and seizures of documents were carried out in the offices of the ROLF Group. According to the press-office of the Investigative Committee, Sergey Petrov and a number of top-managers of the company are suspected under part 3 of Article 193.1 of the Criminal Code (committing currency transactions to transfer funds in foreign currency or the currency of the Russian Federation to the accounts of non-residents using forged documents) and allegedly illegally transferring 4 billion rubles to the accounts of one of the companies owned by Sergey Petrov. Sergey Petrov denied all the charges, calling the charges not consistent with the norms of law. Petrov linked the searches either to an attempt to raid the company, whose turnover in 2018 amounted to almost 230 billion rubles, or to political revenge for his position in the State Duma and support for the opposition. Sergey Petrov also said that he is not going to return to Russia in the near future.

In July 2019, on his own initiative, he resigned from the Board of Directors of ROLF Group.

On September 6, 2019, the Investigative Committee of the Russian Federation declared Petrov on the international wanted list in the case of the withdrawal of 4 billion rubles abroad.

In November 2019, Petrov announced his intention to sell the company ROLF and the formation of a closed list of applicants for the purchase of a car dealer.

As a result, the transaction did not take place.

== Wealth ==
Sergey Petrov's wealth according to Forbes by year:

| Year | 2012 | 2013 | 2014 | 2015 | 2016 | 2017 | 2018 | 2019 | 2020 | 2021 |
| Net worth ($ mln) | 700 | 750 | 1000 | 950 | 750 | 950 | 1000 | 900 | 500 | 950 |
| Ranking number in Russia | 141 | 140 | 109 | 97 | 113 | 106 | 104 | 114 | 189 | 127 |

- 51st place in Russian Forbes list, 2009;
- 50th place in «Vlast I Dengi» ("State and money") list, 2010;
- 114-th place in «200 richest businessmen in Russia» in Russian FORBES list, 2019. The entrepreneur's fortune was estimated at $ 900 million.

== Personal life ==
Married, Has a daughter

== Views on business in Russia ==
Unfortunately, business in Russia is defenceless and businessmen in Russia have a very limited range of ways to protect their business

Business is not just for the money. Money is like blood in the veins, it allows business to exist.

The most profitable business is a fair one. This principle is vital, and all others are complementary.

If we want serious investors to stay [in Russia] for a long time, we need changes. If we send no signal that the country is on its way to democratization, the lion's share of western investors won't be interested to enter the Russian market.

Businessmen need fair play: they should not be afraid that tomorrow someone will come and take everything away, saying "Look, you have drugs in your pocket". Unfortunately, at the current moment, the state and business in Russia are on the different sides of the fence

My views are liberal, but I understand that the best combination for Russia is business and social democracy. We must persuade people that only business can drag Russia from this mire, that business and economics are synonyms.

== Political views ==
I was sick of communism and it did not matter whether it was good or bad for me personally.

It's clear that, as long as we do not have competition between political parties, we could not have any effective campaigns against corruption.

Russia needs basic democracy reforms to show to investors that it has started moving forward. We should make a clear decision to create a favorable investment climate and a friendly background for businesses. Only If we start it, will authoritative officials have no chance to survive".

When not disturbed by strange rules, professional businessmen can contribute to the creation of a real market in the country. We have no choice: we either continue to pretend being the best or start creating an actual working economy in the country."

Until officials know that in case they take bribes they will be kicked the hell out of their positions, then, of course, there won't be any change.

It is not even about the impossibility of economic and political reforms under this corrupt bureaucracy. It doesn't let through any signals, including orders from above. All good intentions, even if they appeared, would stick. The only thing that works like clockwork is all-Russian stealing.

Is it possible to find ten honest prosecutors in our immense country? There is no doubt about it. But not under these authorities.
