= Al Siesta =

British boxing promoter and matchmaker

- Born: Albert Khachaturov; Bishkek, Kyrgyz SSR, Soviet Union (present-day Kyrgyzstan)
- Occupations: Boxing promoter; matchmaker; sports executive
- Years active: 2014–present
- Employer: IBA Pro
- Known for: Promoting Mairis Briedis, Murat Gassiev
- Spouse: Aisha Hussein (m. 2003)
- Children: 2

Albert "Al Siesta" Khachaturov is a British-based boxing promoter, matchmaker and sports executive. He is the founder of Skyboxing Limited (formerly Siesta Boxing) and has served as Director General of IBA Pro, the professional boxing division of the International Boxing Association, since 2024. Fighters he has promoted include former World Boxing Council (WBC) cruiserweight world champion Mairis Briedis and World Boxing Association (WBA) heavyweight champion Murat Gassiev.

== Early life ==
Khachaturov was born in Bishkek, in present-day Kyrgyzstan, and was raised primarily in Moscow, Russia. He attended the Moscow Academy of Contemporary Music before relocating to the United Kingdom in 1996 to pursue a career in music, working as an artist, singer, arranger and composer. He adopted the professional name "Al Siesta" during his music career and retained it when transitioning into boxing.

== Boxing career ==
=== Early matchmaking ===
Khachaturov began working in professional boxing in the mid-2010s as a freelance matchmaker, collaborating with Russian promoter Andrey Ryabinskiy and World of Boxing. During this period, he worked with Armenian-born welterweight David Avanesyan, guiding him to the interim WBA welterweight title in 2015.

=== Work with Mairis Briedis ===
In 2015, Khachaturov began working with Latvian cruiserweight Mairis Briedis as his manager and promoter. Under the newly formed Siesta Boxing promotional outfit, he staged events in Riga, Latvia, including Briedis's victory over South African Danie Venter for the IBF Inter-Continental cruiserweight title in February 2016, and his defeat of Nigerian Olanrewaju Durodola for the WBC Silver cruiserweight title in May 2016.

In April 2017, Briedis defeated Marco Huck in Dortmund to win the WBC cruiserweight world title, becoming the first Latvian boxer to hold a major world championship. Briedis subsequently competed in the World Boxing Super Series, reaching the semi-finals where he lost to Oleksandr Usyk.

=== IBA Pro and Dubai 2025 ===
In early 2024, Khachaturov was appointed Director General of IBA Pro, the professional boxing division of the International Boxing Association (IBA). In this role, he has overseen professional boxing activities including international event sanctioning and strategic partnerships.

On 12 December 2025, Khachaturov served as lead promoter for the WBA heavyweight championship fight between Kubrat Pulev and Murat Gassiev at the Dubai Duty Free Tennis Stadium in the United Arab Emirates, as part of the IBA Pro 13 event. The bout was the first heavyweight world title fight held in the UAE. Gassiev won by sixth-round knockout to claim the WBA (Regular) heavyweight title.

=== Other fighters ===
Khachaturov has also managed and promoted other fighters including WBO Global welterweight champion Luther Clay and IBF super bantamweight champion Ludumo Lamati.

== Business interests ==
Khachaturov operates Skyboxing Limited (formerly Siesta Boxing), a boxing promotional company registered in the United Kingdom. As an advisor, he has worked with promotional outfits including Matchroom Boxing, World Boxing Super Series, RCC Boxing Promotions, Ringstar (France), and OPI Since 82 (Italy).

== Personal life ==
Khachaturov resides in Southampton, England. He married Aisha Hussein in 2003 and the couple have two sons.
