= Umar Kremlev =

Russian sports official

President of the International Boxing Association
- Incumbent
- Assumed office 12 December 2020
- Preceded by: Mohamed Moustahsane

Secretary General of Russian Boxing Federation
- In office 2017–2021
- Succeeded by: Kirill Shekurtsov

Personal details
- Born: November 1, 1982 (age 44) Serpukhov, Russian SFSR, Soviet Union
- Spouse: Anastasia Kremleva
- Education: Moscow State Academy of Public Utilities and Construction.
- Occupation: President of the International Boxing Association (IBA)
- Profession: Sports administrator
- Sports career
- Sport: Boxing

Umar Nazarovich Kremlev (Russian: Умар Назарович Кремлёв; born Lutfulloyev, 1 November 1982) is a Russian sports administrator and businessman who has served as the president of the International Boxing Association (IBA) since 2020. Regarded as an ally of Russian president Vladimir Putin, he previously served as Secretary General of the Boxing Federation of Russia from 2017 to 2021. In 2022, IBA members voted against holding an election by 106 votes to 36, allowing Kremlev to remain IBA president.

Under Kremlev's tenure as IBA head, he has heavily marketed himself, moved the body's operations to Russia, suspended Ukraine from competing, and made the Russian state‑owned energy giant Gazprom the IBA's sole sponsor. The IBA's relationship with the International Olympic Committee (IOC) deteriorated under Kremlev's tenure. The IOC decertified the IBA and took control of the boxing competition from the IBA at the 2024 Paris Olympics, just as it had done at the 2020 Tokyo Olympics. The IOC stated that the IBA had failed to address concerns regarding governance, finance, and corruption.

During his presidency, Kremlev has been accused by international observers and media outlets of orchestrating disinformation campaigns in international sports. Kremlev has stirred controversy by claiming, falsely and without evidence, that the female boxer Imane Khelif failed her gender test after she defeated a Russian boxer, and has allegedly referred to IOC president Thomas Bach as a "chief sodomite".

On 17 September 2026, Latvia banned Umar Kremlev from entering the country indefinitely.

== Early life ==
Kremlev was born on 1 November 1982 to a Tajik father and a Russian mother in Serpukhov. He took up boxing at the local sports palace, training in his hometown under the guidance of coach Alexei Galeev. He left boxing at the age of 19. Kremlev graduated from the Moscow State Academy of Public Utilities and Construction.

== Later life ==
In 2010, he officially changed his surname from Lutfulloyev to Kremlev, his new surname translating literally to "of the Kremlin." Possible reasons for the name change include trading a Tajik surname for one that sounds more Russian, and attempting to distance himself from a youthful criminal history, which includes a conviction for extortion in 2004 and battery in 2007. Around this time, he joined the Night Wolves, a Russian motorcycle club backed by the Russian government, and later took on an administrative role in affiliated ventures.

It is claimed that Kremlev worked for a transport company, Transstroykom LLC, and from 2009 to 2012 served as President of the Centre for Strategic Development and Modernisation.

In 2016, with the support of the leadership of the Federal Security Service of the Russian Federation – in particular Alexey Rubizhny – he became Secretary General and then President of the Boxing Federation of Russia. Kremlev claims that the federation operates on private funds and does not receive financial injections from the government. The federation's main sponsors are the bookmaker Liga Stavok and the National Lottery, which, according to an investigation by Proekt, actually belong to Kremlev himself. Also among the federation's partners was the car dealer Rolf, which, according to the same investigation, also came under Kremlev's control.

Between 2020 and 2023, with the assistance of state structures, Kremlev gained significant control over the Russian betting market. This was facilitated by legislative changes initiated at a high level. In 2020, a law on a single betting accounting centre was passed, and in 2021, a decree by Russian President Vladimir Putin appointed Kremlev's company, TsUPIS, as the sole operator of all bookmaker betting in the country. Kremlev also became the beneficiary of three of Russia's largest betting companies: Fonbet, Pari, and Liga Stavok. In addition, he gained control over the Unified Gambling Regulator, which was created to oversee betting activities.

In 2020, he was elected president of the International Boxing Association (IBA). Kremlev's election caused mixed reactions in the international boxing community owing to his past and his ties to Russian authorities. Under Kremlev's leadership, the IBA signed a sponsorship contract with Gazprom, which intensified the conflict with the International Olympic Committee (IOC). The IBA organises international tournaments that are not recognised by the IOC. In 2023, Kremlev was part of the official Russian delegation during the Russian president's visit to China.

== Career ==
Kremlev has been involved in boxing since his youth. Until July 2017, he was Head of Patriot Boxing Promotions and worked with leading boxers such as Roy Jones Jr., Fedor Chudinov, Dmitry Chudinov, and Mikhail Aloyan. He now works at the Boxing Progress Centre in Moscow.

On 1 February 2017, Kremlev became General Secretary and a Member of the Executive Committee of the Russian Boxing Federation.

On 3 November 2018, Kremlev was elected (with 63 votes) to the Executive Committee of the International Boxing Association (AIBA, later IBA) at the AIBA Congress in Moscow, thus becoming the first Russian to be nominated as a Member of the AIBA Executive Committee.

On 23 February 2019, he was elected First Vice‑President of the European Boxing Confederation (EUBC) by a majority of votes (25 out of 40) at the EUBC General Assembly held in Moscow.

On 21 November 2019, Kremlev was nominated as Chairman of the AIBA Marketing Commission at the AIBA Extraordinary Executive Committee Meeting; he later organised AIBA Continental Forums for the countries of the Americas, Oceania, and Asia in 2020.

He won 57.33 per cent of the vote to replace Mohamed Moustahsane of Morocco as AIBA President on 12 December 2020. The election was held virtually at AIBA's ongoing congress owing to the COVID-19 pandemic. It was attended by 155 National Federations from five continents.

The International Olympic Committee (IOC) has been concerned about the IBA under Kremlev's leadership. Kremlev has ties to Vladimir Putin, has moved much of the IBA's operations from Lausanne, Switzerland, to Russia, has spent heavily on apparent self‑promotion, and has opposed the independent appointment of judges and referees. The IOC has also been alarmed by the fact that the IBA's only sponsor was a Russian state‑owned energy company (Gazprom) that supports the Russian invasion of Ukraine, although Kremlev said that sponsorship ended in December 2022. This statement was later refuted in August 2024 by Chris Roberts, IBA's British chief, who confirmed that Gazprom remained an IBA sponsor. In September 2022, the IBA voted against holding a presidential election, cementing Kremlev's position as the organisation's president.

In 2023, the IBA suspended two fighters, Imane Khelif and Lin Yu-ting, on unspecified grounds. Khelif was suspended shortly before her gold medal bout against the Chinese boxer Yang Liu, three days after defeating Azalia Amineva, a previously unbeaten Russian prospect, at the IBA's world championships. Kremlev later stated, without providing proof, that Khelif had failed a gender test. No evidence has been presented that Khelif has XY chromosomes or elevated levels of testosterone. Kremlev said that the tests were carried out by medical professionals "at the request of female athletes" and after "the women's coaches complained a lot", and claimed that he could not release the medical records of the two tested athletes because they contained their personal and genetic data. Khelif has been deemed eligible for all other boxing competitions, including the Olympics.

On 2 September 2024, Kremlev, still the head of the IBA, was announced as the new owner of the state‑run car dealership Rolf.

== Donald Trump Jr. wedding financing ==
In September 2026, ProPublica published an investigation titled "Donald Trump Jr.'s Bahamas wedding was secretly bankrolled by Russian oligarch close to Putin", referring to Kremlev's financing of a portion of Donald Trump Jr. and Bettina Anderson's May 2026 post-wedding activities. The report claimed Kremlev had paid for $100,000 worth of wedding expenses for Trump Jr. and Anderson, including renting one of two private islands where the wedding was held and a fireworks show.

On September 14, 2026, Anderson confirmed the report in an Instagram post, writing Kremlev hosted a two nights of the wedding celebrations as "an extraordinarily generous wedding gift", describing Kremlev as a "dear friend".

=== Reaction ===
The acceptance of Kremlev's gifts by private US individuals was characterized as legal, but was criticized by ethics watchdog groups, including presenting the appearance of a conflict of interest for the son of the president to accept gifts from an individual associated with a foreign head of state.

Jordan Libowitz, vice president of communications for Citizens for Responsibility and Ethics in Washington (CREW), said, "People don't just give hundreds of thousands of dollars to a random acquaintance without wanting something," adding, "You can see how [Putin] would enjoy all this press about how people in his circle are cozying up to people in the president's circle."

Representative Robert Garcia, ranking member on the House Oversight and Government Reform Committee, issued a social media statement demanding more details, writing, "Why did a Russian oligarch close to Putin fund Trump Jr.’s wedding in the Bahamas?". Garcia added, "Umar Kremlev spent hundreds of thousands of dollars on the President’s son. What did he get in return? We need answers."

In a letter sent to White House Chief of Staff Susie Wiles and Trump Jr. on September 14, 2026, Garcia asked them to provide any documentation related to Kremlev, writing, "As the son of President Donald Trump and the part-owner and major investor of multiple companies with extensive Department of Defense contracts, any apparent ties to members of Russian President Vladimir Putin’s inner circle raises serious questions about pay-to-play schemes and foreign intelligence infiltration of the President’s family."

President Donald Trump gave a statement to The New York Times on September 14, 2026, saying "I have no idea who Umar is, never heard of him, and he didn’t pay for Don and Bettina’s wedding, which took place at a totally different location, and on a different day." In 2025, Kremlev had previously solicited the Trump Administration's support in a dispute between the International Boxing Association and the International Olympic Committee in an open letter. He later stated that Trump Jr. had repaid Kremlev for the wedding and that hosting a wedding party for someone else was "totally allowed" and "very common".

== Awards ==
- Medal of the Order "For Merit to the Fatherland", Second Class (11 March 2020), for a great contribution to the development of physical culture and sport, and for diligent work.
- Certificate of Honour of the President of the Russian Federation; the medal "25 Years Since the Establishment of the Presidential Security Service"; received gratitude from the President of the Russian Federation "for many years of diligent work and active social activities"; and the Cross of the International Order of St. George Glory.
- Order of Friendship (April 2026)
