= Boxing Federation of Russia =

Sports governing body in Russia

Russian Boxing Federation
- Sport: Boxing
- Founded: 1 February 1992; 34 years ago
- President: Umar Kremlev

Official website
- rusboxing.ru
- (Russia)

The Russian Boxing Federation (RBF) (Russian: Федерация бокса России, romanized: Federatsiya boksa Rossii) is the governing body of both Olympic-style and professional boxing in Russia. The Federation was founded on 1 February 1992 after the dissolution of the USSR Boxing Federation. The RBF is the member of the International Boxing Association and European Boxing Confederation.

The IBA temporarily suspended Russian athletes from competing in international competitions starting on 4 March 2022 due to the Russian invasion of Ukraine. Later that month, the Federation expressed its direct support for the ongoing invasion of Ukraine, and stated: "The entire boxing community of Russia expresses its full confidence and support to the President of the Russian Federation Vladimir Vladimirovich Putin!" In October 2023, the congratulations on Putin's birthday were published on the official RBF's Instagram account. Several athletes, including 2023 World Championships medallists Edmond Khudoian and Sharabutdin Ataev, published their personal congratulations through their social media.

Umar Kremlev has been the IBA president since 2017.

== Controversy ==
=== Olympics 2016 Rio, Brazil ===
During the 2016 Olympic Games several bouts involving Russian boxers seemed to be judged in favour of the Russian athlete, when it was clear to many they had lost. Bantamweight Vladimir Nikitin was given a unanimous decision against Ireland's world champion Michael Conlan in the quarterfinal of the tournament, with judges all scoring for the Russian in rounds one and three. Afterwards, in an irate television interview, Conlan claimed AIBA were cheats and had been paid to fix fights. In order to reach the quarterfinal bout with Conlan, Nikitin was controversially awarded the win by split decision when he fought Thailand's Chatchai Butdee. According to the Bangkok Post, Butdee was quoted as saying, "I should have won the fight. I think I was more on target. I do not really understand the judges' decisions."

The day after the quarterfinal AIBA denied these allegations; however, they removed several Judges and Referees for the panel for the rest of the games over irregularities in scoring. They also stated decisions would stand.
