= French Boxing Federation =

Governing body of boxing in France

- Sport: Amateur boxing
- Abbreviation: FFB
- Founded: February 15, 1903
- Affiliation: World Boxing
- Affiliation date: January 24, 2025
- Regional affiliation: Europe
- President: Martin André

Official website
- www.ffboxe.com
- (France)

The French Boxing Federation French: Fédération Française de Boxe or FFB) is the governing body of both amateur and professional boxing in France.

== Presidents ==
Emile Grémaux was the President of FFB for a long time.

Martin André was the President in 2015.

In 2024, Olympic silver medallist Sarah Ourahmoune stood in a joint bid with the previous President of the French Boxing Federation, Dominique Nato, to be the President. She wasn't the only female candidate as Estelle Mossely the 2016 Olympic lightweight champion was also standing. However in the November Sarah withdrew a month before the election. She cited the racist and sexist abuse she had received as the reason.
