= International Boxing Association =

International boxing governing body

- Abbreviation: IBA
- Formation: 29–30 November 1946
- Type: Sports federation
- Headquarters: Lausanne, Switzerland
- Region served: Worldwide
- President: Umar Kremlev
- Main organ: Congress
- Website: IBA.sport

The International Boxing Association (IBA), previously known as the Association Internationale de Boxe Amateur (AIBA), is a sports organization that governs and sanctions amateur and professional boxing matches and awards world and subordinate championships. The president of the organization is the Russian Umar Kremlev. In 2023, the International Olympic Committee (IOC) expelled the IBA, due to concerns related to corruption, financial transparency, and possible ties to the Russian government.

It is one of the oldest boxing federations in the world, coming into existence after the 1920 Summer Olympics. The IBA's status in the boxing community began to decline in the 2000s, and more so in the 2010s and 2020s; multiple presidencies—such as those of Anwar Chowdhry (1986–2006), Wu Ching-kuo (2006–2017), and Umar Kremlev (2020–present)—have been impacted by governance issues and allegations of corruption, such as concerns over the integrity of officiating and scoring in Olympic boxing. Financial mismanagement during Wu Ching-kuo's tenure caused the association to incur a large amount of unpaid debt, resulting in his departure in 2017, and being issued a lifetime ban in 2018. In June 2019, the International Olympic Committee (IOC) suspended the association due to governance and financial issues, preventing it from sanctioning boxing at the Summer Olympics; an IOC-organised task force oversaw boxing at the 2020 and 2024 Summer Olympics.

Kremlev was elected in 2020 with a promise of reforms, and the rehabilitation of its relationship with the IOC. Under Kremlev, the IBA instituted a major restructuring of its executive board, introduced a financial assistance program for national federations, added prize money to its World Boxing Championships, and paid off its outstanding debt. It also commissioned an independent report by Richard McLaren that found systemic attempts to manipulate match outcomes for money during the 2016 Summer Olympics. Kremlev's tenure has been controversial, with concerns raised by the IOC over the IBA's increasing ties to Russia after he assumed the presidency (including moving much of its operations to Russia and having state-owned Gazprom as sole sponsor for a period), opposition to the independent appointment of judges and referees, irregularities during subsequent presidential elections, and the controversial disqualifications of Imane Khelif and Lin Yu-ting during the IBA's 2023 world championships.

Following the Russian invasion of Ukraine, a group of national federations known as the Common Cause Alliance (CCA) demanded transparency over the IBA's finances and the Gazprom sponsorship, and pledged continued support for boxing as an Olympic event. In October 2022, the IBA lifted a ban on Russian and Belarusian athletes competing under their national flags, which had been imposed amid the invasion. Its 2023 world championships faced boycotts from a number of countries, and false statements by the IBA claiming that they were an "approved" qualifying path for the 2024 Summer Olympics. The CCA later evolved into a competing amateur boxing federation known as World Boxing. In June 2023, the IOC voted to formally revoke its recognition of the IBA, due to a lack of sufficient progress on addressing governance, finance, and corruption concerns since the original suspension; the IBA became the first international federation to ever be expelled from the Olympic movement. The IOC subsequently granted provisional recognition to World Boxing in February 2025.

The IBA consists of five continental confederations, the African Boxing Confederation, American Boxing Confederation, Asian Boxing Confederation, European Boxing Confederation, and Oceania Boxing Confederation. As of 2021, the IBA included 198 national boxing federations. It organises the biennial IBA World Boxing Championships.

== History ==
=== 1920–2009 ===
During the 1920 Summer Olympics in Antwerp, representatives from the national associations of England, France, Belgium, Brazil and the Netherlands met in a preliminary consortium for the foundation of an international boxing federation: The Fédération internationale de boxe amateur (FIBA). The official foundation has been celebrated on 24 August. Right after, international competitions appeared in the boxing arena, allowing amateurs to compete in well-known tournaments.

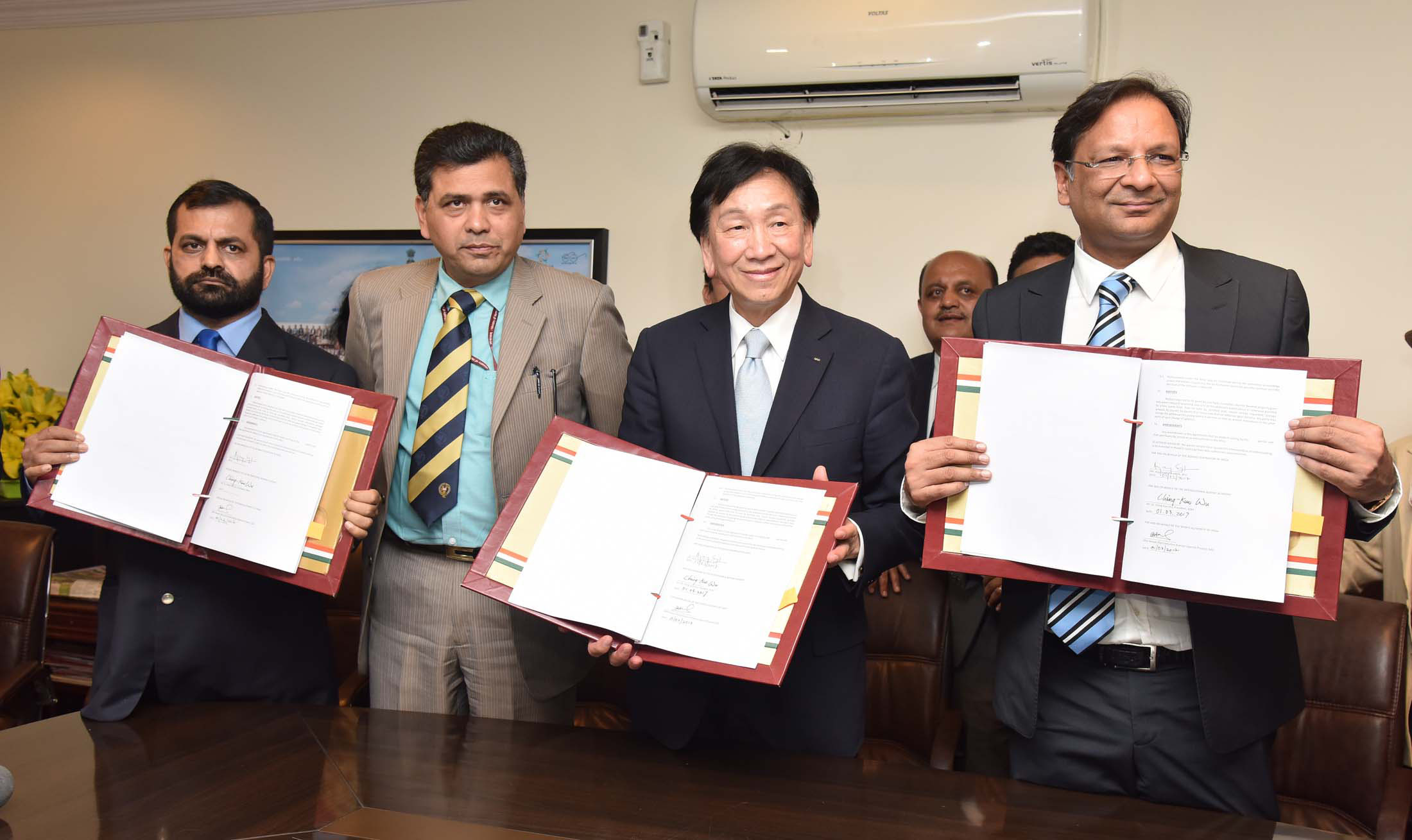
Then-AIBA president Wu Ching-kuo with representatives of the Boxing Federation of India in New Delhi, India, 1 March 2017

In November 1946, a consensus was met to give way for the boxing governing body to regain the loss of credibility due to the behavior of some leading officials in World War II. The FIBA was dissolved and the English Amateur Boxing Association in partnership with the French Boxing Federation decided to create the Association Internationale de Boxe Amateur (AIBA). The president of the French Boxing Federation, Emile Grémaux, was elected to the position of President.

Anwar Chowdhry first became president of AIBA in 1986. While he would be one of the longest-tenured in the AIBA's history, it was one marked by criticism over the association's handling of officiating and judging during boxing at the Summer Olympic Games. During a gold medal bout at the 1988 Summer Olympics, American boxer Roy Jones Jr. controversially lost to Park Si-hun of host nation South Korea in a disputed, 3–2 decision, despite Jones' dominant performance throughout the match. Amid allegations of bias in judging, Chowdhry oversaw multiple reforms, including the adoption of computerised scoring, and alcohol screenings for judges and referees.

Despite these changes, controversies surrounding officiating persisted into later Olympics, including accusations of misconduct. At the 1996 Summer Olympics, Daniel Petrov's victory over Onyok Velasco faced allegations of computer scoring irregularities from Filipino media outlets, although other critics (such as The New York Times) felt that while Velasco deserved more points, Petrov was still the clear winner.

The International Olympic Committee (IOC) began to increase its scrutiny of the AIBA following judging scandals in other Olympic sports, such as figure skating at the 2002 Winter Olympics, and gymnastics at the 2004 Summer Olympics. In 2005, the IOC froze US$9 million in funding to the AIBA until it established a "clear timeline and planned actions" for judging reforms; Chowdhry stated that the association was working towards a move to "open" scoring (where judges' scores would be displayed to the audience in real-time in order to provide greater transparency), and was working on changes to how it selects officials ahead of the 2008 Summer Olympics.

In 2006, Wu Ching-kuo challenged Chowdhry for the AIBA's presidency, winning the vote 83-79 at the AIBA Congress in Santo Domingo. The campaign was fraught with controversies, including allegations of bribery from both the Chowdhry and Wu campaigns, and armed bodyguards intimidating voters. Pierre Diakite—a delegate from Mali—was found dead in an elevator shaft at the hotel where the Congress was hosted, and carrying what was thought to be bribe money.

In 2007, AIBA changed its full name to the "International Boxing Association" as part of a rebranding, albeit maintaining "AIBA" as its abbreviated name.

=== 2010–2019 ===
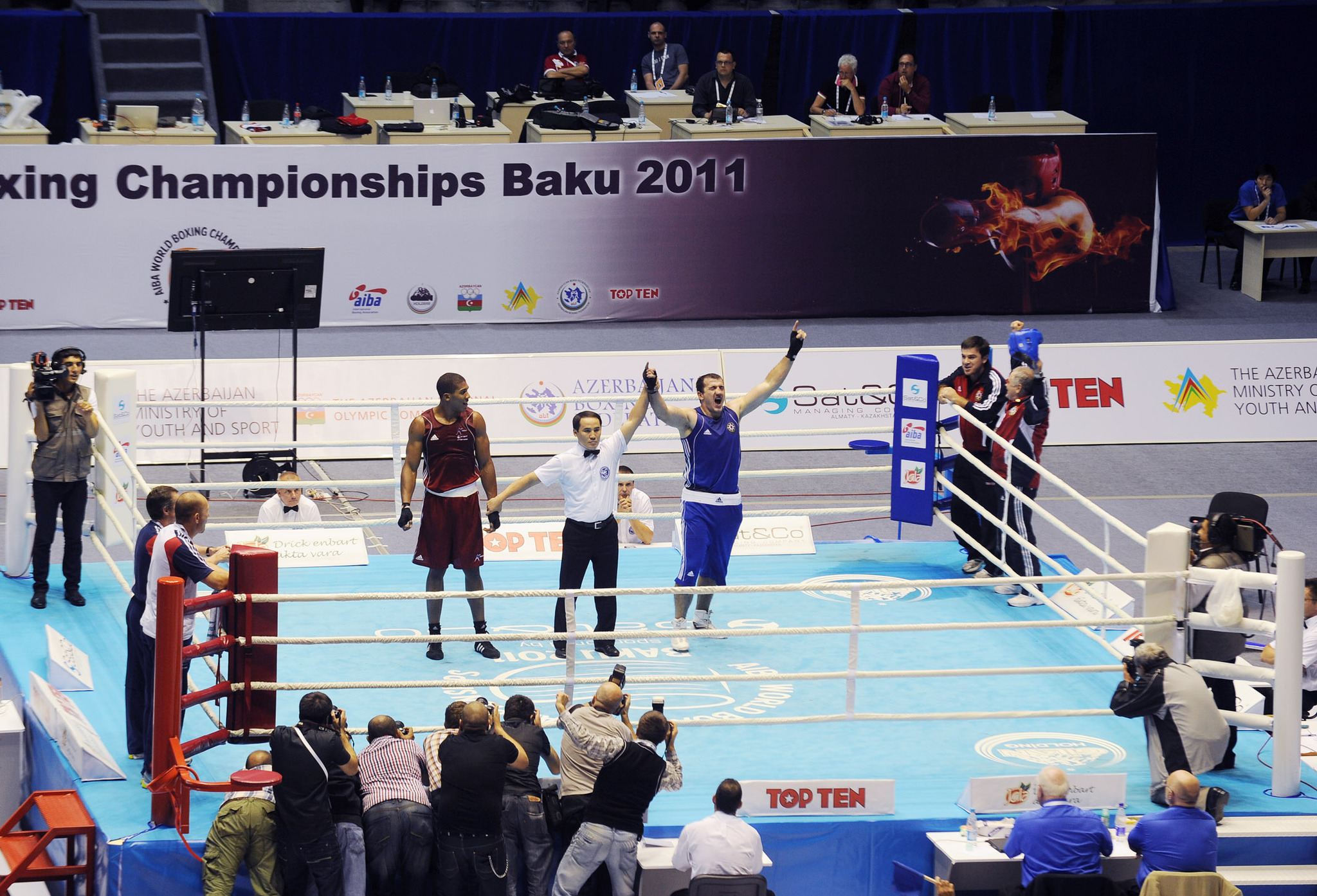
2011 AIBA World Boxing Championships in Baku, Azerbaijan

In 2010, AIBA launched the World Series of Boxing (WSB), a new semi-professional, international club competition involving teams of amateur boxers. AIBA described the circuit as a "pathway" to professional boxing, aiming to "[reunite] the broader boxing world and its grassroots amateur foundation." Competitors would be able to maintain their amateur and Olympic eligibility, and the competitions would also offer a qualification pathway for the Olympics. The WSB would be operated by the commercial company WSB SA on behalf of the AIBA; its main investor was Hong Kong-based First Commitment International Trade.

In 2011, BBC News reported via whistleblowers that an Azeri national had made a $9 million payment to WSB SA as a bribe, promising two gold medals in boxing at the 2012 Summer Olympics in return. AIBA denied the allegations, stating that the payment was from an Azeri investor and "made on a commercial basis and with a view to a commercial return", and that the report "demonstrate[s] a complete misunderstanding of the procedures which lead to the award of Olympic boxing medals and the impossibility of influencing these."

Scrutiny over officiating would re-emerge during the 2012 Olympics. In a men's bantamweight Round of 16 bout, Satoshi Shimizu of Japan knocked Magomed Abdulhamido of Azerbaijan to the floor six times without referee Ishanguly Meretnyyazov ever issuing a standing-eight count; the judges then awarded the victory to Abdulhamidov. The AIBA overturned the result on appeal and dismissed Meretnyyazov from the Games, ruling that the fight should have been stopped and awarded to Shimizu after three knockdowns.

In March 2013, AIBA announced that it would end the mandatory use of headgear in senior men's competitions (19–40 years old) at the national, continental and international levels effective 1 June; it cited studies finding that headgear actually increased the risk of concussions and head injuries, as they provided a false sense of security by encouraging boxers to make harder punches at their opponent's head or attack with their own head, and that they obscured peripheral vision. The change does not apply to males under 19, nor women, where headguards remain mandatory.

At the 2016 Summer Olympics, boxing switched to a 10-point system modelled after professional boxing, with scores counted from a random selection of three out of the five judges after each round, based on criteria such as punches landed and effective aggressiveness. Two results in particular attracted controversy: the defeat of Vasily Levit by Russian Evgeny Tishchenko in the men's heavyweight gold-medal fight, drawing jeers from the audience, and the defeat of Michael Conlan by Russian Vladimir Nikitin in the men's bantamweight quarter-final.

Conlan accused AIBA and the Russian team of cheating; he asked Russian president Vladimir Putin on Twitter, "Hey Vlad, How much did they charge you bro??" The AIBA would remove an unspecified number of judges and referees following the controversy, stating that they "determined that less than a handful of the decisions were not at the level expected" and "that the concerned referees and judges will no longer officiate at the Rio 2016 Olympic Games"; however, the original decision would still remain.

In July 2017, Wu began to face scrutiny over the AIBA's finances, including reports that it was facing demands for repayments from investors such as the Azerbaijani company Benkons (a US$10 million loan meant to be repaid in 2013) and First Commitment International Trade (who had invested CHF 19 million in AIBA's marketing arm, but did not receive a return on investment before being shut down and replaced by an agreement with Alisports), and only had $7 million in cash on hand. Its treasurer and finance director resigned, while Wu removed of a member of AIBA's executive committee after they raised concerns over irregularities in its finances.

Wu was suspended in October 2017 by the AIBA disciplinary commission, citing his poor financial management and attempts to remove his opponents from the executive committee. On 20 November 2017, Wu announced that he would step down as president effective immediately, with senior vice president Franco Falcinelli replacing him in the interim. In a joint statement, AIBA and Wu stated that they had "amicably agreed to resolve the management issues within AIBA and to withdraw and terminate all related pending procedures before civil courts and AIBA disciplinary commission."

In December 2017, the IOC expressed concerns about the governance of AIBA under Wu Ching-kuo's leadership, and reaffirmed these concerns in an IOC Executive Board decision in February 2018. In October 2018, AIBA issued lifetime bans to Wu and former executive director Ho Kim, after a report documented "gross negligence and financial mismanagement of affairs and finances". In November 2018, Gafur Rakhimov was elected the new president of AIBA, beating Serik Konakbayev.

In June 2019, the IOC voted to suspend its recognition of AIBA as the governing body for the sport, stripping AIBA of any involvement in the Olympic Games. The IOC oversaw the qualification events and the boxing tournament at the 2020 Summer Olympics through a task force chaired by Morinari Watanabe, president of the International Gymnastics Federation. The task force adopted the AIBA's technical rules, albeit with some amendments to eligibility requirements and to improve transparency in judging and scoring. Rakhimov stepped down on 15 July 2019, amid scrutiny of his presence on a U.S. Treasury Department sanctions list for alleged ties to a criminal organization; he stated that there was an "urgent need for my continued presence in the defence process of the case, which is related to the politicised accusations against me." Mohamed Moustahsane of Morocco served as an interim president during this time.

=== 2020–2021 ===
An Extraordinary AIBA Congress was held virtually in December 2020 to elect a new president, with the ballot contested between Moustahsane, Dutch Boxing Federation president Boris van der Vorst, and Umar Kremlev of the Boxing Federation of Russia. On 12 December 2020, Kremlev was elected as president of AIBA, receiving 57.33% of the vote. Kremlev had declared himself "the most clean candidate" after reports that the IOC had concerns over some of the candidates; Kremlev promised reforms, efforts to reinstate the AIBA's status with the IOC, and to pay off its debt.

A new constitution was adopted the next day, creating five new committees: the Coaches Committee, the Champions and Veterans Committee, the Competition Committee, the Women's Committee, and the Medical and Anti-Doping Committee. The 32-member executive committee was replaced with a 22-member board of directors; new members would be elected rather appointed by the president. The Medical and Anti-Doping Committee renewed AIBA's agreement with the International Testing Agency (ITA). In 2021, Olympic champion, two-time World champion István Kovács was appointed General Secretary of AIBA. A program of financial assistance to national federations was also introduced. In March 2021, AIBA appointed Ulrich Haas to lead the AIBA's Independent Governance Reform Group.

On 7 April 2021, AIBA's new management signed a cooperation agreement with Russian state-owned energy company Gazprom, through which it became the organization's "General Partner". AIBA stated they had paid off all debts, including that of Benkons. On May 28, 2021, AIBA signed a collaboration agreement with the International Military Sports Council.

In September 2021, AIBA released an independent report commissioned from Canadian lawyer Richard McLaren, which had found that bouts leading up to and during the 2016 Summer Olympics had been manipulated. The report found bouts had been manipulated for money (up to $250,000), the perceived benefit of AIBA, or to thank National Federations, their Olympic committees, or hosts of competitions for their financial support and political backing.

At the 2021 AIBA World Boxing Championships, the AIBA increased the number of weight classes for men and women to 13 and 12, respectively. For the first time, cash prizes were introduced for medalists as well, with $100,000 for gold medals, $50,000 for silver, and $25,000 for both bronze medals; Kremlev stated that boxers should be "successful in the ring, but also self-sufficient and prosperous".

In November 2021, the Independent Governance Reform Group recommended the replacement of the majority of AIBA's board of directors and a further reduction in membership to 18, citing a "severe loss of trust by major stakeholders, including the IOC" due to "poor or non-existent monitoring, investigation and prosecution of integrity issues". It also recommended the addition of a liaison officer as a point of contact between AIBA and the IOC, and the replacement of the Ethics and Disciplinary committees with a Boxing Integrity Unit, which would operate independently of AIBA. These amendments among others, including term limits and new eligibility criteria for board members, were adopted in an Extraordinary Congress in December 2021. To mark the association's 75th anniversary, AIBA also unveiled a new logo and officially adopted "IBA" as its abbreviated name.

In December 2021, the IOC provisionally dropped boxing and two other sports from the 2028 Summer Olympics, pending the resolution of governance issues in their respective federations.

=== 2022 ===
The Russian invasion of Ukraine in 2022 had a notable impact on the perception of the IBA, and the impact of that event can be seen in both the attitudes of the IBA and towards the IBA and its competitions. Kremlev has been a close ally of Russian president Vladimir Putin, with Le Monde having suggested that Kremlev's IBA presidency was "an opportunity to promote Russia's soft power" in the aftermath of the Russian doping scandal. Some of the IBA's operations had also been relocated from Switzerland to Russia.

The IBA initially followed the IOC's recommendation that Russian and Belarusian athletes not be allowed to compete under their national flags. A consortium known as the Common Cause Alliance was formed by 18 national federations, demanding that the IBA evaluate the impact of the invasion on itself and the Russian Boxing Federation, and seeking more transparency over its finances and the Gazprom agreement. It also pledged support for preserving boxing as a Summer Olympic sport.

The IOC had been concerned about the IBA under Kremlev's leadership, citing the Gazprom sponsorship, Kremlev having spent heavily on apparent self-promotion, and having opposed independent appointment of judges and referees. Prior to the IBA Congress in Istanbul in May 2022, the IOC sent a letter to the IBA detailing continued concerns for the organisation's "governance, financial sustainability and the proven integrity of the refereeing and judging systems", and noting that it had yet to produce any work on proposed qualification paths for the 2024 Summer Olympics.

At the Congress, five presidential election candidates connected to the Common Cause Alliance were deemed ineligible by the Interim Nomination Unit of the Boxing Independent Integrity Unit (BIIU) one day before the vote, accusing them of engaging in prohibited "collaborations" and campaigning outside of the designated period. One of the candidates—Boris van der Vorst (who felt that Kremlev's reform efforts had so far been "superficial")—declared his intent to file an appeal in the Court of Arbitration for Sport (CAS). He cited that the IBA's Disciplinary Committee had approved the candidates, and ruled that the activities of the Common Cause Alliance were supportive of the IBA's mission. Kremlev was re-elected for a four-year term. Indian boxer Lovlina Borgohain was elected as the chair and a voting member on the board of directors for the IBA's Athletes' Committee.

The BIIU decision was overturned by CAS; therefore, a special IBA Congress was held in September 2022 in Yerevan. The IBA's members subsequently voted against a new election, cementing Kremlev's position as the organization's president. During a speech to the Congress, Kremlev began to distance the IBA from the IOC and Olympics, including stating that "Olympic boxing" should be referred to as "IBA boxing", and affirming that "no one else should have influence on the organisation".

During the Congress, the IBA also suspended the Ukraine Boxing Federation, accusing it of "government interference". At the 2022 European Junior Boxing Championships afterward, the Ukraine delegation was initially prohibited from competing under its flag due to the suspension, resulting in multiple boxers forfeiting their matches in protest. The IBA subsequently stated that the delegation would be allowed to compete under their flag. The IOC expressed concern over the suspension and the outcome of the vote, and stated that it would be investigated.

On 5 October 2022, the IBA lifted its ban on Russian and Belarusian athletes competing under their flags, stating that it "strongly believes that politics shouldn't have any influence on sports." The move faced criticism, with Finland and Sweden stating that they would boycott any IBA-sanctioned event featuring Russian or Belarusian boxers.

In November 2022, the IBA signed a cooperation agreement with the World Boxing Association, one of the four major sanctioning bodies in professional boxing.

=== 2023–present ===
Boxing at the 2024 Summer Olympics was sanctioned by the IOC's Paris 2024 Boxing Unit due to the suspension of the IBA. In December 2022, the IOC announced direct qualifiers incorporating the continental multi-sport events and two world qualification events. Amid growing boycotts of the 2023 IBA World Boxing Championships by nations such as Canada, the Czech Republic, the Netherlands, Poland, Sweden, Switzerland, and the United States, the IBA announced its own Olympic qualification system in February 2023 that incorporated the World Boxing Championships—which the IBA claimed had been approved by the IOC executive board in 2022. The IBA argued that the exclusion of its championships from the IOC pathways were "against the principles of boxing", and criticized the IOC for having too few qualifying events. Due to the suspension, the IBA did not have the authority to sanction Olympic qualifiers; USA Boxing accused the IBA of spreading misinformation to "sabotage" the qualification process, and the IOC reiterated that its system was the only approved qualification pathway for the 2024 Olympics.

In March 2023, Ajay Singh, President of the Boxing Federation of India (BFI), was appointed vice-president of the IBA. During the 2023 IBA World Women's Boxing Championships that month, the IBA controversially disqualified Algerian boxer Imane Khelif hours before her gold medal match, and stripped Taiwanese boxer Lin Yu-ting of her bronze medal, both reportedly for failing sex verification tests by having high levels of testosterone; Khelif had defeated a Russian opponent—the then-undefeated Azaliia Amineva—in the round of 16. The IBA claimed that Khelif had tested positive on unspecified DNA tests for XY chromosomes; however this claim has been disputed by Khelif's supporters.

A rival governing body known as World Boxing was launched in April 2023, with its interim board including officials from member organizations of the Common Cause Alliance. USA Boxing was the first national federation to resign from the IBA in favour of exclusively representing World Boxing. The IBA condemned World Boxing as a "rogue organization" whose sole purpose was to destroy the IBA's integrity, and threatened sanctions against national federations, athletes, and officials who participate in its events. In May 2023, Kremlev stated that the IBA's sponsorship with Gazprom had ended in December 2022. He stated that while it was influenced by "recommendations" by other sports bodies, the decision was made independently.

On 8 May 2023, the IBA-controlled European Boxing Confederation ordered member federations to withdraw from a tournament being hosted by the Czech Republic due to its violation of EUBC and IBA rules, as members of non-member USA Boxing had been registered as participants. Later that month, the IBA suspended Germany, the Netherlands, New Zealand, and Sweden for their involvement in World Boxing, and the Czech Republic for hosting an event including ineligible boxers; van der Vorst—who was named World Boxing's first president—stated that the suspensions were "yet another clear demonstration of how the IBA proclaims its implementation of reforms, such as the establishment of the Integrity Unit, only to subsequently make authoritative and retaliatory decisions that contradict its own regulations."

On 22 June 2023 during an Extraordinary IOC Session, the IOC executive board voted to withdraw its recognition of the IBA—marking the first time an international federation has been expelled from the Olympic movement. The board cited that the IBA had not shown sufficient progress on the concerns raised upon its 2019 suspension, including governance, finances, and corruption. The decision was criticised by the IBA, which stated that it was "catastrophic for global boxing and blatantly contradicts the IOC's claims of acting in the best interests of boxing and athlete", and compared it to Nazi Germany's declaration of war on the Soviet Union (whose anniversary fell on the same day). World Boxing welcomed the decision, stating that it provided greater certainty for the future of boxing at the Olympics. The IOC's decision was upheld by CAS in April 2024, prompting the IBA to file another request for appeal, this time with the Federal Supreme Court of Switzerland; general secretary Chris Roberts argued that the CAS "was biased in favour of the IOC"

In October 2023, the IBA sent a cease and desist notice to World Boxing, asserting a trademark on "World Boxing" registered with the Swiss Federal Institute of Intellectual Property; however, the trademark had been registered a month after World Boxing's formation was announced. That month, IOC president Thomas Bach stated that a final decision on boxing for the 2028 Olympics was "on hold" pending further developments.

In April 2024, the IBA announced the formation of a new professional boxing committee.

During the 2024 Summer Olympics, Imane Khelif and Lin Yu-ting were both cleared to compete by the Paris 2024 Boxing Unit under its own criteria. Controversy re-emerged during Khelif's round of 16 match against Italian boxer Angela Carini, who retired after taking two blows from Khelif. The match also resulted in Khelif receiving backlash from those who questioned her biological sex and gender identity; Khelif was assigned female at birth, and her gender identity corresponds with that. On 31 July 2024, regarding their 2023 decision, the IBA stated that Khelif and others "did not undergo a testosterone examination but were subject to a separate and recognized test, whereby the specifics remain confidential", and further alleged that they "were found to have competitive advantages over other female competitors". The following day, the IOC issued a statement denouncing the IBA's original decision in 2023 as being "arbitrary" and "taken without any proper procedure." The IOC further stated:

According to the IBA minutes available on their website, this decision was initially taken solely by the IBA Secretary General and CEO. The IBA Board only ratified it afterward and only subsequently requested that a procedure to follow in similar cases in the future be established and reflected in the IBA Regulations. The minutes also say that the IBA should "establish a clear procedure on gender testing".

On 30 September 2024, the IOC sent a letter to National Olympic Committees (NOCs) requesting that they cease their relationships with bodies affiliated with the IBA, and instead work with those that are, or intend to affiliate, with a boxing federation "established for the purpose of Olympic Boxing." In response, the IBA initiated legal action against the IOC, accusing it of interfering with its operations."

In February 2025, the IOC granted provisional recognition to World Boxing as the international federation for amateur boxing. At the 144th IOC Session the following month, per the recommendation of the Executive Board, the IOC unanimously voted to reinstate boxing as a Summer Olympic event in 2028. In February 2025, the Boxing Federation of Ukraine withdrew from the IBA and subsequently joined World Boxing.

In May 2025, the IBA announced that it would expand into bare-knuckle boxing; Kremlev described the expansion as a means of "[meeting] the interests of a new generation of athletes and fans worldwide". On 2 July 2025 at a press event in Istanbul attended by Rashida Ali, Tyson Fury, and Terence Crawford, Kremlev announced a roadmap for the organisation's "golden era", which would include a further focus on helping amateur boxers transition to professional competition, and expanding fan interaction. He also formally announced its adoption of rules and regulations for bare-knuckle boxing. The IBA hosted its first bare-knuckle boxing event on 27 July 2025.

== Competitions ==
Under the leadership of President Wu Ching-kuo, who ran AIBA from 2006 to 2017, the organization divided its competitions into three categories as part of Wu's overarching goal to govern boxing in all its forms:

- AIBA Open Boxing (AOB), formerly known as amateur or Olympic boxing
- AIBA Pro Boxing (APB), a professional boxing league
- World Series of Boxing (WSOB), a semi-professional team tournament contested under a hybrid of amateur- and professional-style rules (including five rounds instead of three, and not wearing vests or headgear).

Wu's two professional ventures were abandoned by AIBA largely due to the organization's financial woes, which led to Wu's resignation in November 2017. AIBA Pro Boxing staged bouts only from late 2014 to 2016, and the World Series of Boxing abruptly ceased operations amid mounting financial losses after its 2018 season.

In January 2025, the IBA launched IBA Pro, a professional boxing platform led by Director General Al Siesta, with its inaugural event held in Moscow. Designed to help amateur boxers transition into professional careers, IBA Pro had promoted fourteen events across multiple countries by early 2026, including a broadcast partnership with DAZN. At IBA Pro 13 in Dubai on 12 December 2025, Murat Gassiev defeated Kubrat Pulev by sixth-round knockout to claim the WBA heavyweight title, in what was the first heavyweight world title fight held in the United Arab Emirates.

== Presidents ==
- Émile Grémaux – France, 1946–1959
- Lieutenant-Colonel Rudyard Russell – Great Britain, 1962–1978
- Colonel Don Hull – USA, 1978–1986
- Anwar Chowdhry – Pakistan, 1986–2006
- Caner Doğaneli – Turkey, 2006, act.p.
- Wu Ching-kuo – Chinese Taipei, 2006–2017
- Gafur Rakhimov – Uzbekistan, 2017–2019
- Mohamed Moustahsane – Morocco, 2019–2020, int.p.
- Umar Nazarovich Kremlev – Russia, 2020–present

== Events ==
- Olympic Games (formerly)
- IBA World Boxing Championships
- Youth Olympic Games (formerly)
- Youth and Junior World Boxing Championships
- Boxing World Cup (inactive)
- World Series of Boxing (inactive)

== See also ==
- List of boxing organisations
- Val Barker Trophy
- Thrilla in Manila: The 50th Anniversary
