= 2015 AIBA World Boxing Championships – Heavyweight =

Boxing competitions

== General Information ==
The 2015 AIBA World Boxing Championships were held from the 5th to the 18th of October in 2015. The 2015 heavyweight weight class at the AIBA World Boxing Championships competed a total of 23 bouts from the 7th of October to the 14th of October with a total of 24 boxers. The heavyweight weight class starts at 200 pounds (91kg) and up. This is a qualifying tournament for the upcoming 2016 Summer Olympics.

== Medalists ==
Gold	Evgeny Tishchenko (RUS)
Silver	Erislandy Savón (CUB)
Bronze	Abdulkadir Abdullayev (AZE)
Bronze	Gevorg Manukian (UKR)

== Seeds ==
1. (Cuba) Erislandy Savón
2. (Kazakhstan) Vasiliy Levit (Quarterfinals)
3. (Russia) Evgeny Tishchenko
4. (Azerbaijan) Abdulkadir Abdullayev (Semifinals)

== Draw ==
=== Finals ===
Semifinals
1	Erislandy Savón (CUB)	3
4	Abdulkadir Abdullayev (AZE)	0
3	Evgeny Tishchenko (RUS)	3
2	Gevorg Manukian (UKR)	0

Final
Erislandy Savón (CUB)	0
Evgeny Tishchenko (RUS)	3

==== Section 1 ====
Round of 32
Ihab Al-Matbouli (JOR)	0
Julio Castillo (ECU)	3
Roman Fress (GER)	2
Jason Whateley (AUS)	1
Paul Omba Biongolo (FRA)	0
Chouaib Bouloudinat (ALG)	3

Round of 16
Erislandy Savón (CUB)	3
Julio Castillo (ECU)	0
Rustam Tulaganov (UZB)	3
David Nyika (NZL)	0
Yamil Peralta (ARG)	3
Roman Fress (GER)	0
Chouaib Bouloudinat (ALG)	0
Abdulkadir Abdullayev (AZE)	3

Quarterfinals
Erislandy Savón (CUB)	3
Rustam Tulaganov (UZB)	0
Yamil Peralta (ARG)	0
Abdulkadir Abdullayev (AZE)	3

Semifinals
Erislandy Savón (CUB)	3
Abdulkadir Abdullayev (AZE)	0

==== Section 2 ====
Round of 32
Mehmood Hussan (PAK)
Joshua Temple (USA)	TKO
Nikolajs Grisunins (LAT)	3
Siarhei Karneyeu (BLR)	0
Jahon Qurbonov (TJK)	0
Igor Jakubowski (POL)	3
Juan Goncalves Nogueira (BRA)	3
Abdeljalil Abouhamda (MAR)	0

Round of 16
Evgeny Tishchenko (RUS)	3
Joshua Temple (USA)	0
Nikolajs Grisunins (LAT)	0
Roy Korving (NED)	3
Gevorg Manukian (UKR)	3
Igor Jakubowski (POL)	0
Juan Goncalves Nogueira (BRA)
Vasiliy Levit (KAZ)	WO

Quarterfinals
Evgeny Tishchenko (RUS)	3
Roy Korving (NED)	0
Gevorg Manukian (UKR)	3
Vasiliy Levit (KAZ)	0

Semifinals
Evgeny Tishchenko (RUS)	3
Gevorg Manukian (UKR)	0

== Results ==
=== Ranking ===
Rank	Athlete
1st place, gold medalist(s)	Evgeny Tishchenko (RUS)
2nd place, silver medalist(s)	Erislandy Savón (CUB)
3rd place, bronze medalist(s)	Abdulkadir Abdullayev (AZE)
3rd place, bronze medalist(s)	Gevorg Manukian (UKR)
5	Rustam Tulaganov (UZB)
5	Yamil Peralta (ARG)
5	Roy Korving (NED)
5	Vasiliy Levit (KAZ)
9	Julio Castillo (ECU)
9	David Nyika (NZL)
9	Roman Fress (GER)
9	Chouaib Bouloudinat (ALG)
9	Joshua Temple (USA)
9	Nikolajs Grisunins (LAT)
9	Igor Jakubowski (POL)
9	Juan Goncalves Nogueira (BRA)
17	Ihab Al-Matbouli (JOR)
17	Jason Whateley (AUS)
17	Paul Omba Biongolo (FRA)
17	Mehmood Hussan (PAK)
17	Siarhei Karneyeu (BLR)
17	Jahon Qurbonov (TJK)
17	Abdeljalil Abouhamda (MAR)
