= Kazakhstan at the 2016 Summer Olympics =

- IOC code: KAZ
- NOC: National Olympic Committee of the Republic of Kazakhstan
- Website: www.olympic.kz (in Kazakh, Russian, and English)

in Rio de Janeiro
- Competitors: 104 in 17 sports
- Flag bearer: Ruslan Zhaparov
- Medals Ranked 30th: Gold 2 Silver 5 Bronze 10 Total 17

Summer Olympics appearances (overview)
- 1996; 2000; 2004; 2008; 2012; 2016; 2020; 2024; 2028

Other related appearances
- Russian Empire (1900–1912); Soviet Union (1952–1988); Unified Team (1992)

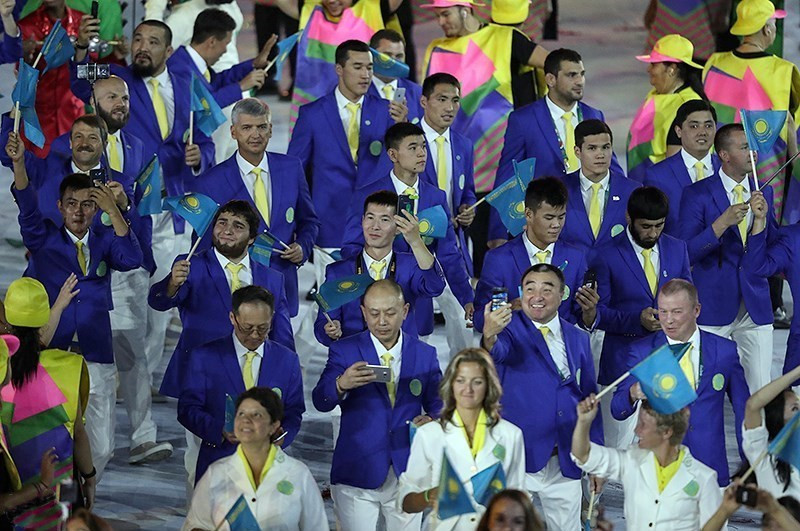
Kazakhstan at the 2016 Summer Olympics opening ceremony.

Kazakhstan competed at the 2016 Summer Olympics in Rio de Janeiro, Brazil, from 5 to 21 August 2016. It was the nation's sixth consecutive appearance at the Summer Olympics in the post-Soviet era. The National Olympic Committee of the Republic of Kazakhstan fielded a roster of 104 athletes, 55 men and 49 women, to compete across seventeen different sports at these Games, the smallest Summer Olympic team since the nation's debut in Atlanta 1996. Moreover, Kazakhstan did not send teams in any of the team sports for the first time in twenty years. Track and field accounted for the largest number of athletes on the Kazakh squad, with 25 entries. There was a single competitor each in slalom canoeing, track cycling, fencing, and table tennis (for the first time after an eight-year absence).

Four of the nation's Olympic medalists from London 2012 returned, defending triple jump champion Olga Rypakova, Russian-born wrestling veteran Guzel Manyurova, and boxers Adilbek Niyazymbetov (light heavyweight) and Ivan Dychko (super heavyweight). Triple jumper and 2006 Asian Games runner-up Roman Valiyev was the most experience Kazakh athlete, participating in his fourth Games. Along with Rypakova and Manyurova, six more athletes also made their third Olympic appearance, including boxing quarterfinalist Birzhan Zhakypov in the men's light flyweight division, and sprint kayaker Natalya Sergeyeva (aged 40), the oldest athlete of the roster. Heavyweight taekwondo fighter Ruslan Zhaparov was nominated by the committee to carry the Kazakh flag at the opening ceremony.

Kazakhstan returned home from Rio de Janeiro with 18 medals (three golds, five silver, and ten bronze), marking its most successful outcome in Summer Olympic history. As expected, most of the medals were distributed to the Kazakh athletes in both boxing and weightlifting, including a gold each from Youth Olympian Nijat Rahimov (men's 77 kg) and welterweight boxer Daniyar Yeleussinov. The remaining gold medal, however, went to swimmer Dmitriy Balandin, who surprisingly outlasted the favorites from the outside in the men's 200 m breaststroke to hand the Kazakhs their historic first Olympic swimming title.

Apart from the winners, other medalists also included fellow boxers Niyazymbetov and Dychko, who managed to repeat their London 2012 feats in their respective weight divisions; Rypakova, who scored another medal with a bronze in the women's triple jump, bowing out of her title defense to Colombia's Caterine Ibargüen; Manyurova, who wrestled her way towards a runner-up finish in the women's 75 kg, adding a silver to her career hardware of three medals; and weightlifter Denis Ulanov, who received the bronze in the men's 85 kg, following the disqualification of Romania's Gabriel Sîncrăian over a doping offense.

== Medalists ==
Medal	Name	Sport	Event	Date
Gold	Dmitriy Balandin	Swimming	Men's 200 m breaststroke	10 August
Gold	Daniyar Yeleussinov	Boxing	Men's welterweight	17 August
Silver	Yeldos Smetov	Judo	Men's 60 kg	6 August
Silver	Zhazira Zhapparkul	Weightlifting	Women's 69 kg	10 August
Silver	Vasiliy Levit	Boxing	Men's heavyweight	15 August
Silver	Adilbek Niyazymbetov	Boxing	Men's light heavyweight	18 August
Silver	Guzel Manyurova	Wrestling	Women's 75 kg	18 August
Bronze	Galbadrakhyn Otgontsetseg	Judo	Women's 48 kg	6 August
Bronze	Farkhad Kharki	Weightlifting	Men's 62 kg	8 August
Bronze	Karina Goricheva	Weightlifting	Women's 63 kg	9 August
Bronze	Denis Ulanov	Weightlifting	Men's 85 kg	12 August
Bronze	Olga Rypakova	Athletics	Women's triple jump	14 August
Bronze	Alexandr Zaichikov	Weightlifting	Men's 105 kg	15 August
Bronze	Elmira Syzdykova	Wrestling	Women's 69 kg	17 August
Bronze	Yekaterina Larionova	Wrestling	Women's 63 kg	18 August
Bronze	Ivan Dychko	Boxing	Men's super heavyweight	19 August
Bronze	Dariga Shakimova	Boxing	Women's middleweight	19 August

Medals by sport
Sport	1st place, gold medalist(s)	2nd place, silver medalist(s)	3rd place, bronze medalist(s)	Total
Boxing	1	2	2	5
Weightlifting	0	1	4	6
Swimming	1	0	0	1
Wrestling	0	1	2	3
Judo	0	1	1	2
Athletics	0	0	1	1
Total	2	5	10	18

Medals by date
Day	Date	1st place, gold medalist(s)	2nd place, silver medalist(s)	3rd place, bronze medalist(s)	Total
Day 1	6 August	0	1	1	2
Day 2	7 August	0	0	0	0
Day 3	8 August	0	0	1	1
Day 4	9 August	0	0	1	1
Day 5	10 August	1	1	0	3
Day 6	11 August	0	0	0	0
Day 7	12 August	0	0	1	1
Day 8	13 August	0	0	0	0
Day 9	14 August	0	0	1	1
Day 10	15 August	0	1	1	2
Day 11	16 August	0	0	0	0
Day 12	17 August	1	0	1	2
Day 13	18 August	0	2	1	3
Day 14	19 August	0	0	2	2
Total		2	5	10	18

== Competitors ==
The following is the list of number of competitors participating in the Games:

Sport	Men	Women	Total
Archery	1	1	2
Athletics	5	19	24
Boxing	10	2	12
Canoeing	7	5	12
Cycing	3	0	3
Fencing	1	0	1
Gymnastics	1	1	2
Judo	4	2	6
Modern pentathlon	1	1	2
Rowing	1	1	2
Shooting	3	2	5
Swimming	2	1	3
Synchronized swimming	0	2	2
Table tennis	1	0	1
Taekwondo	1	2	3
Tennis	0	2	2
Weightlifting	5	3	8
Wrestling	8	4	12
Total	54	48	102

== Archery ==
Two Kazakh archers qualified each for both the men's and women's individual recurve by obtaining one of the three Olympic places available from the 2015 Asian Archery Championships in Bangkok, Thailand.

Athlete	Event	Ranking round		Round of 64	Round of 32	Round of 16	Quarterfinals	Semifinals	Final / BM	
Athlete	Event	Score	Seed	Opposition Score	Opposition Score	Opposition Score	Opposition Score	Opposition Score	Opposition Score	Rank
Sultan Duzelbayev	Men's individual	648	48	Gu Xs (CHN); W 6–4	Nespoli (ITA); L 0–6	Did not advance				
Luiza Saidiyeva	Women's individual	625	36	Pavlova (UKR); L 0–6	Did not advance					

== Athletics ==
Kazakh athletes have so far achieved qualifying standards in the following athletics events (up to a maximum of 3 athletes in each event):

Key

- Note–Ranks given for track events are within the athlete's heat only
- Q = Qualified for the next round
- q = Qualified for the next round as a fastest loser or, in field events, by position without achieving the qualifying target
- NR = National record
- N/A = Round not applicable for the event
- Bye = Athlete not required to compete in round

Track & road events
Men

Athlete	Event	Heat		Semifinal		Final	
Athlete	Event	Result	Rank	Result	Rank	Result	Rank
Dmitriy Koblov	400 m hurdles	49.87	6	Did not advance			
Mihail Krassilov	Marathon	—N/a				2:26:11	101
Georgiy Sheiko	20 km walk	—N/a				1:23:31	34

Women

Athlete	Event	Heat		Quarterfinal		Semifinal		Final	
Athlete	Event	Result	Rank	Result	Rank	Result	Rank	Result	Rank
Rima Kashafutdinova	100 m	Bye		11.84	7	Did not advance			
Olga Safronova	100 m	Bye		11.50	5	Did not advance			
Olga Safronova	200 m	23.29	4	—N/a		Did not advance			
Viktoriya Zyabkina	100 m	Bye		11.69	5	Did not advance			
Viktoriya Zyabkina	200 m	23.34	7	—N/a		Did not advance			
Anastassya Kudinova	400 m	56.03	7	—N/a		Did not advance			
Elina Mikhina	400 m	53.83	6	—N/a		Did not advance			
Margarita Mukasheva	800 m	2:00.97	5	—N/a		Did not advance			
Anastassiya Pilipenko	100 m hurdles	13.29	8	—N/a		Did not advance			
Aleksandra Romanova	400 m hurdles	59.36	8	—N/a		Did not advance			
Irina Smolnikova	Marathon	—N/a						3:00:31	122
Gulzhanat Zhanatbek	Marathon	—N/a						DNF	
Diana Aydosova	20 km walk	—N/a						1:44:49	62
Polina Repina	20 km walk	—N/a						DSQ	
Svetlana Ivanchukova; Rima Kashafutdinova; Anastassiya Pilipenko; Yuliya Rakhmanova; Olga Safronova; Anastassiya Tulapina; Viktoriya Zyabkina	4 × 100 m relay	DSQ		—N/a				Did not advance	

Field events
Men

Athlete	Event	Qualification		Final	
Athlete	Event	Distance	Position	Distance	Position
Roman Valiyev	Triple jump	NM	—	Did not advance	
Ivan Ivanov	Shot put	17.38	33	Did not advance	
Yevgeniy Labutov	Discus throw	55.54	31	Did not advance	

Women

Athlete	Event	Qualification		Final	
Athlete	Event	Distance	Position	Distance	Position
Irina Ektova	Triple jump	13.33	16	Did not advance	
Yekaterina Ektova	Triple jump	13.51	15	Did not advance	
Olga Rypakova	Triple jump	14.39	2 Q	14.74	3rd place, bronze medalist(s)
Mariya Telushkina	Discus throw	45.33	32	Did not advance	

== Boxing ==
Kazakhstan has entered twelve boxers (10 men and 2 women) to compete in each of the following weight classes into the Olympic boxing tournament. Berik Abdrakhmanov and two-time Olympian Birzhan Zhakypov were the first Kazakhs to be selected to the Olympic team with a top two finish in the AIBA Pro Boxing series, while Vasiliy Levit did so in the World Series of Boxing.

2012 Olympian Daniyar Yeleussinov was the only Kazakh boxer qualifying through the 2015 World Championships. Meanwhile, seven further boxers (Yeraliyev, Sattibayev, Zhussupov, Alimkhanuly, Niyazymbetov, Dychko, and Shakimova) had claimed their Olympic spots at the 2016 Asia & Oceania Qualification Tournament in Qian'an, China.

Zhaina Shekerbekova rounded out the Kazakh boxing roster with a quarterfinal victory in women's flyweight division at the World Championships in Astana.

Men

Athlete	Event	Round of 32	Round of 16	Quarterfinals	Semifinals	Final	
Athlete	Event	Opposition Result	Opposition Result	Opposition Result	Opposition Result	Opposition Result	Rank
Birzhan Zhakypov	Light flyweight	Bye	Hamunyela (NAM); W 3–0	Dusmatov (UZB); L 0–3	Did not advance		
Olzhas Sattibayev	Flyweight	Cintrón (PUR); W 2–1	Mamishzada (AZE); L 0–3	Did not advance			
Kairat Yeraliyev	Bantamweight	Chalabiyev (AZE); W 2–1	Akhmadaliev (UZB); L 0–3	Did not advance			
Berik Abdrakhmanov	Lightweight	Balderas (USA); L 0–3	Did not advance				
Ablaikhan Zhussupov	Light welterweight	McCormack (GBR); L 1–2	Did not advance				
Daniyar Yeleussinov	Welterweight	Bye	Kelly (GBR); W 3–0	Maestre (VEN); W 3–0	Cissokho (FRA); W 3–0	Giyasov (UZB); W 3–0	1st place, gold medalist(s)
Zhanibek Alimkhanuly	Middleweight	Fowler (GBR); W 3–0	Abbadi (ALG); W 3–0	Shakhsuvarly (AZE); L 1–2	Did not advance		
Adilbek Niyazymbetov	Light heavyweight	Bye	Dauhaliavets (BLR); W 3–0	Mammadov (AZE); W 3–0	Buatsi (GBR); W 3–0	La Cruz (CUB); L 0–3	2nd place, silver medalist(s)
Vasiliy Levit	Heavyweight	Bye	Yu Fk (CHN); W TKO	St-Pierre (MRI); W 3–0	Savón (CUB); W 3–0	Tishchenko (RUS); L 0–3	2nd place, silver medalist(s)
Ivan Dychko	Super heavyweight	Bye	Majidov (AZE); W 3–0	Ajagba (NGR); W 3–0	Joyce (GBR); L 0–3	Did not advance	3rd place, bronze medalist(s)

Women

Athlete	Event	Round of 16	Quarterfinals	Semifinals	Final	
Athlete	Event	Opposition Result	Opposition Result	Opposition Result	Opposition Result	Rank
Zhaina Shekerbekova	Flyweight	Bye	Ourahmoune (FRA); L 0–3	Did not advance		
Dariga Shakimova	Middleweight	Fortin (CAN); W 2–1	El-Mardi (MAR); W 3–0	Shields (USA); L 0–3	Did not advance	3rd place, bronze medalist(s)

== Canoeing ==
=== Slalom ===
Kazakh canoeists have qualified a maximum of one boat in each of the following classes through the 2015 ICF Canoe Slalom World Championships and the 2016 Asian Championships.

Athlete	Event	Preliminary						Semifinal		Final	
Athlete	Event	Run 1	Rank	Run 2	Rank	Best	Rank	Time	Rank	Time	Rank
Yekaterina Smirnova	Women's K-1	127.64	19	119.80	14	119.80	19	Did not advance			

=== Sprint ===
Kazakh canoeists have qualified one boat in each of the following events through the 2015 ICF Canoe Sprint World Championships. The sprint canoeing squad, highlighted by London 2012 Olympians Natalya Sergeyeva and kayak duo of Yevgeniy Alexeyev and Alexey Dergunov, were officially named to the Kazakhstan roster on July 24, 2016.

Men

Athlete	Event	Heats		Semifinals		Final	
Athlete	Event	Time	Rank	Time	Rank	Time	Rank
Alexey Dergunov	K-1 200 m	36.647	8	Did not advance			
Ilya Golendov	K-1 1000 m	3:37.953	7	Did not advance			
Timur Khaidarov	C-1 200 m	40.492	4 Q	41.079	5 FB	40.549	14
Timur Khaidarov	C-1 1000 m	5:30.030	6 Q	5:33.919	8	Did not advance	
Yevgeniy Alexeyev; Alexey Dergunov	K-2 1000 m	3:30.433	6 Q	3:18.858	4 FB	3:20.827	11
Sergii Tokarnytskyi; Andrey Yerguchyov	K-2 200 m	33.807	5 Q	35.151	5 FB	35.427	12
Ilya Golendov; Sergii Tokarnytskyi; Alexandr Yemelyanov; Andrey Yerguchyov	K-4 1000 m	3:04.883	7 Q	3:00.592	4 FB	3:08.715	10

Women

Athlete	Event	Heats		Semifinals		Final	
Athlete	Event	Time	Rank	Time	Rank	Time	Rank
Zoya Ananchenko	K-1 500 m	1:58.136	5 Q	2:01.660	7	Did not advance	
Inna Klinova	K-1 200 m	41.030	4 Q	40.381	3 FA	41.521	8
Irina Podoinikova; Natalya Sergeyeva	K-2 500 m	1:45.369	3 Q	1:43.577	3 FA	1:48.361	7
Zoya Ananchenko; Inna Klinova; Irina Podoinikova; Natalya Sergeyeva	K-4 500 m	1:36.127	4 Q	1:37.423	5 FB	1:39.419	10

Qualification Legend: FA = Qualify to final (medal); FB = Qualify to final B (non-medal)

== Cycling ==
=== Road ===
Kazakh riders qualified for a maximum of two quota places in the men's Olympic road race by virtue of their top 4 national ranking in the 2015 UCI Asia Tour. NOC Kazakhstan had named rookies Bakhtiyar Kozhatayev and Alexey Lutsenko to the Olympic team on June 29, 2016.

On July 30, 2016, Lutsenko withdrew from the Games due to a foot injury sustained from a car accident during his training in France, so his spot was awarded to a fellow cyclist Andrey Zeits.

Athlete	Event	Time	Rank
Bakhtiyar Kozhatayev	Men's road race	6:30:05	61
Andrey Zeits	Men's road race	6:10:30	8
Andrey Zeits	Men's time trial	1:18:47.63	24

=== Track ===
Following the completion of the 2016 UCI Track Cycling World Championships, Kazakhstan has entered one rider to compete in the men's omnium at the Olympics, by virtue of his final individual UCI Olympic ranking in that event.

Omnium

Athlete	Event	Scratch race		Individual pursuit			Elimination race		Time trial			Flying lap			Points race		Total points	Rank
Athlete	Event	Rank	Points	Time	Rank	Points	Rank	Points	Time	Rank	Points	Time	Rank	Points	Points	Rank	Total points	Rank
Artyom Zakharov	Men's omnium	12	22	4:32.503	15	12	5	32	1:03.941	10	22	13.446	13	16	7	8	111	10

== Fencing ==
Kazakhstan has entered one fencer into the Olympic competition. Ilya Mokretsov claimed his Olympic spot in the men's sabre with a top-three finish at the Asian Zonal Qualifier in Wuxi, China.

Athlete	Event	Round of 32	Round of 16	Quarterfinal	Semifinal	Final / BM	
Athlete	Event	Opposition Score	Opposition Score	Opposition Score	Opposition Score	Opposition Score	Rank
Ilya Mokretsov	Men's sabre	Homer (USA); L 11–15	Did not advance				

== Gymnastics ==
=== Rhythmic ===
Kazakhstan has qualified one rhythmic gymnast in the individual all-around for the Games by claiming one of eight available Olympic spots at the Olympic Test Event in Rio de Janeiro.

Athlete	Event	Qualification						Final					
Athlete	Event	Hoop	Ball	Clubs	Ribbon	Total	Rank	Hoop	Ball	Clubs	Ribbon	Total	Rank
Sabina Ashirbayeva	Individual	17.183	17.283	17.400	17.366	69.232	12	Did not advance					

=== Trampoline ===
Kazakhstan has qualified one gymnast in the men's trampoline by picking up a spare berth freed by the Tripartite Commission, as the next highest from the eligible NOC on the individual ranking list at the 2016 Olympic Test Event in Rio de Janeiro.

Athlete	Event	Qualification		Final	
Athlete	Event	Score	Rank	Score	Rank
Pirmammad Aliyev	Men's	105.890	12	Did not advance	

== Judo ==
Kazakhstan has qualified a total of six judokas for each of the following weight classes at the Games. Four of them (three men and one woman) were ranked among the top 22 eligible judokas for men and top 14 for women in the IJF World Ranking List of May 30, 2016, while Marian Urdabayeva at women's lightweight (57 kg) earned a continental quota spot from the Asian region, as Kazakhstan's top-ranked judoka outside of direct qualifying position.

Being the highest-ranked judoka outside the world's top 22, Didar Khamza took over the vacant spot for Kazakhstan in the men's 73 kg, as Canada's Arthur Margelidon had been pulled out from the Games with a fractured forearm.

Athlete	Event	Round of 64	Round of 32	Round of 16	Quarterfinals	Semifinals	Repechage	Final / BM	
Athlete	Event	Opposition Result	Opposition Result	Opposition Result	Opposition Result	Opposition Result	Opposition Result	Opposition Result	Rank
Yeldos Smetov	Men's −60 kg	Bye	El-Kawisah (LBA); W 100–000	McKenzie (GBR); W 001–000	Urozboev (UZB); W 001–000	Safarov (AZE); W 010–000	Bye	Mudranov (RUS); L 000–010	2nd place, silver medalist(s)
Zhansay Smagulov	Men's −66 kg	Lefevere (BEL); W 000–000	An B-u (KOR); L 000–110	Did not advance					
Didar Khamza	Men's −73 kg	Njie (GAM); W 002–000	Orujov (AZE); L 000–000 S	Did not advance					
Maxim Rakov	Men's −100 kg	Bye	Minaskin (EST); W 000–000 S	Krpálek (CZE); L 000–000 S	Did not advance				
Galbadrakhyn Otgontsetseg	Women's −48 kg	—N/a	Bye	Lima (GBS); W 010–010 S	Kondo (JPN); L 010–100	Did not advance	Csernoviczki (HUN); W 100–000	Mestre (CUB); W 100–000	3rd place, bronze medalist(s)
Marian Urdabayeva	Women's −63 kg	—N/a	Yang Jx (CHN); L 000–100	Did not advance					

== Modern pentathlon ==
Kazakhstan has qualified two modern pentathletes for the following events at the Games. Yelena Potapenko had claimed an Olympic spot as the highest-ranked eligible modern pentathlete outside the top five at the 2015 Asia & Oceania Championships. Meanwhile, London 2012 Olympian Pavel Ilyashenko received a spare Olympic berth freed by one of the South Koreans, as the highest-ranked eligible modern pentathlete, not yet qualified, in the men's event at the same meet.

Athlete	Event	Fencing (épée one touch)				Swimming (200 m freestyle)			Riding (show jumping)			Combined: shooting/running (10 m air pistol)/(3200 m)			Total points	Final rank
Athlete	Event	RR	BR	Rank	MP points	Time	Rank	MP points	Penalties	Rank	MP points	Time	Rank	MP Points	Total points	Final rank
Pavel Ilyashenko	Men's	18–17	0	21	208	2:06.19	27	322	EL	=33	0	11:29.79	17	611	1141	35
Yelena Potapenko	Women's	17–18	0	20	202	2:11.52	5	306	7	7	293	13:07.48	22	513	1314	10

== Rowing ==
Kazakhstan has qualified one boat each in the men's and women's single sculls for the Olympics at the 2016 Asia & Oceania Continental Qualification Regatta in Chungju, South Korea.

Athlete	Event	Heats		Repechage		Quarterfinals		Semifinals		Final	
Athlete	Event	Time	Rank	Time	Rank	Time	Rank	Time	Rank	Time	Rank
Vladislav Yakovlev	Men's single sculls	7:38.65	5 R	12:04.17	5 SE/F	Bye		11:45.22	4 FF	7:21.61	31
Svetlana Germanovich	Women's single sculls	9:34.15	5 R	8:00.42	3 SE/F	Bye		8:29.81	1 FE	8:38.25	26

Qualification Legend: FA=Final A (medal); FB=Final B (non-medal); FC=Final C (non-medal); FD=Final D (non-medal); FE=Final E (non-medal); FF=Final F (non-medal); SA/B=Semifinals A/B; SC/D=Semifinals C/D; SE/F=Semifinals E/F; QF=Quarterfinals; R=Repechage

== Shooting ==
Kazakh shooters have achieved quota places for the following events by virtue of their best finishes at the 2015 ISSF World Cup series, and Asian Championships, as long as they obtained a minimum qualifying score (MQS) by March 31, 2016.

Athlete	Event	Qualification		Semifinal		Final	
Athlete	Event	Points	Rank	Points	Rank	Points	Rank
Vladimir Issachenko	Men's 10 m air pistol	579	23	—N/a		Did not advance	
Vladimir Issachenko	Men's 50 m pistol	536	36	—N/a		Did not advance	
Rashid Yunusmetov	Men's 10 m air pistol	567	40	—N/a		Did not advance	
Rashid Yunusmetov	Men's 50 m pistol	553	13	—N/a		Did not advance	
Yuriy Yurkov	Men's 10 m air rifle	615.3	44	—N/a		Did not advance	
Yuriy Yurkov	Men's 50 m rifle prone	621.4	25	—N/a		Did not advance	
Yuriy Yurkov	Men's 50 m rifle 3 positions	1167	29	—N/a		Did not advance	
Mariya Dmitriyenko	Women's trap	66	8	Did not advance			
Yelizaveta Korol	Women's 10 m air rifle	410.6	37	—N/a		Did not advance	
Yelizaveta Korol	Women's 50 m rifle 3 positions	575	26	—N/a		Did not advance	

Qualification Legend: Q = Qualify for the next round; q = Qualify for the bronze medal (shotgun)

== Swimming ==
Kazakh swimmers have so far achieved qualifying standards in the following events (up to a maximum of 2 swimmers in each event at the Olympic Qualifying Time (OQT), and potentially 1 at the Olympic Selection Time (OST)):

Athlete	Event	Heat		Semifinal		Final	
Athlete	Event	Time	Rank	Time	Rank	Time	Rank
Dmitriy Balandin	Men's 100 m breaststroke	59.47	9 Q	59.45	8 Q	59.85	8
Dmitriy Balandin	Men's 200 m breaststroke	2:09.00	6 Q	2:08.20	8 Q	2:07.46 NR	1st place, gold medalist(s)
Vitaliy Khudyakov	Men's 10 km open water	—N/a				DSQ	
Yekaterina Rudenko	Women's 100 m backstroke	1:01.28	20	Did not advance			

== Synchronized swimming ==
Kazakhstan has fielded a squad of two synchronized swimmers to compete only in the women's duet by virtue of their tenth-place finish at the FINA Olympic test event in Rio de Janeiro.

Athlete	Event	Free routine (preliminary)		Technical routine			Free routine (final)		
Athlete	Event	Points	Rank	Points	Total (technical + free)	Rank	Points	Total (technical + free)	Rank
Alexandra Nemich; Yekaterina Nemich	Duet	81.400	15	81.4686	162.8686	15	Did not advance		

== Table tennis ==
Kazakhstan has entered one athlete into the table tennis competition at the Games for the first time since 2008. Kirill Gerassimenko scored a second-stage draw victory to book one of six remaining Olympic spots in the men's singles at the Asian Qualification Tournament in Hong Kong.

Athlete	Event	Preliminary	Round 1	Round 2	Round 3	Round of 16	Quarterfinals	Semifinals	Final / BM	
Athlete	Event	Opposition Result	Opposition Result	Opposition Result	Opposition Result	Opposition Result	Opposition Result	Opposition Result	Opposition Result	Rank
Kirill Gerassimenko	Men's singles	Bye	Pattantyús (HUN); L 1–4	Did not advance						

== Taekwondo ==
Kazakhstan entered three athletes into the taekwondo competition at the Olympics. Ruslan Zhaparov, Ainur Yesbergenova, and Cansel Deniz secured Olympic spots in the men's heavyweight (+80 kg), women's flyweight (49 kg), and women's welterweight category (67 kg) by virtue of their top two finish at the 2016 Asian Qualification Tournament in Manila, Philippines.

Athlete	Event	Round of 16	Quarterfinals	Semifinals	Repechage	Final / BM	
Athlete	Event	Opposition Result	Opposition Result	Opposition Result	Opposition Result	Opposition Result	Rank
Ruslan Zhaparov	Men's +80 kg	Isayev (AZE); L 2–11	Did not advance		Cha D-m (KOR); L 8–15	Did not advance	7
Ainur Yesbergenova	Women's −49 kg	Zaninović (CRO); L 7–18	Did not advance				
Cansel Deniz	Women's −67 kg	Chuang C-c (TPE); L 2–16 PTG	Did not advance				

== Tennis ==
Kazakhstan has entered four tennis players into the Olympic tournament. London 2012 Olympians Mikhail Kukushkin (world no. 61) and Galina Voskoboeva (world no. 451), along with rookie Yulia Putintseva (world no. 35), qualified directly among the top 56 eligible players for their respective singles events based on the ATP and WTA World Rankings as of June 6, 2016. Voskoboeva also opted to play with her London 2012 partner Yaroslava Shvedova in the women's doubles.

On July 20, 2016, Kukushkin announced his withdrawal from the Games due to an injury sustained in the Wimbledon match, with Putintseva joining him nine days later because of the shoulder injury.

Athlete	Event	Round of 64	Round of 32	Round of 16	Quarterfinals	Semifinals	Final / BM	
Athlete	Event	Opposition Score	Opposition Score	Opposition Score	Opposition Score	Opposition Score	Opposition Score	Rank
Yaroslava Shvedova	Women's singles	Doi (JPN); L 3–6, 4–6	Did not advance					
Galina Voskoboeva	Women's singles	Withdrew on 5 August due to scheduling changes						
Yaroslava Shvedova; Galina Voskoboeva	Women's doubles	—N/a	Flipkens / Wickmayer (BEL); L 1–6, 0–1^{ret}	Did not advance				

== Weightlifting ==
Kazakh weightlifters have qualified a maximum of six men's and four women's quota places for the Rio Olympics based on their combined team standing by points at the 2014 and 2015 IWF World Championships. The team must allocate these places to individual athletes by June 20, 2016.

On June 22, 2016, the International Weightlifting Federation had decided to strip one Olympic men's and one women's entry place each from Kazakhstan because of "multiple positive cases" of doping throughout the qualifying period.

The full weightlifting squad, led by London 2012 Olympian Alexandr Zaichikov, was named to the Olympic roster on July 12, 2016.

Men

Athlete	Event	Snatch		Clean & Jerk		Total	Rank
Athlete	Event	Result	Rank	Result	Rank	Total	Rank
Arli Chontey	−56 kg	130	5	148	6	278	4
Farkhad Kharki	−62 kg	135	3	170	2	305	3rd place, bronze medalist(s)
~~Nijat Rahimov~~	−77 kg	~~165~~	~~3~~	~~214~~	~~1~~	~~379~~	DSQ ^{1}
Denis Ulanov	−85 kg	175	3	215	3	390	3rd place, bronze medalist(s)
Alexandr Zaichikov	−105 kg	193	3	223	3	416	3rd place, bronze medalist(s)

^{1} Rahimov originally won the gold medal, but was disqualified in March 2022 after a doping violation.

Women

Athlete	Event	Snatch		Clean & Jerk		Total	Rank
Athlete	Event	Result	Rank	Result	Rank	Total	Rank
Margarita Yelisseyeva	−48 kg	80	9	106	4	186	5
Karina Goricheva	−63 kg	111	2	132	3	243	3rd place, bronze medalist(s)
Zhazira Zhapparkul	−69 kg	115	2	144	2	259	2nd place, silver medalist(s)

== Wrestling ==
Kazakhstan has qualified a total of twelve wrestlers for each of the following weight classes into the Olympic competition. Three of them had booked Olympic spots as one of the top six finalists each in the men's freestyle 57 kg, and the men's Greco-Roman 59 & 75 kg at the 2015 World Championships, while the majority of Olympic berths were awarded to Kazakh wrestlers, who progressed to the top two finals at the 2016 Asian Qualification Tournament.

The wrestling squad was named to the Olympic roster on June 13, 2016, with two-time medalist Guzel Manyurova aiming for another medal in the women's heavyweight at her third Games.

Key:

- VT – Victory by Fall.
- PP – Decision by Points – the loser with technical points.
- PO – Decision by Points – the loser without technical points.
- ST – Technical superiority – the loser without technical points and a margin of victory of at least 8 (Greco-Roman) or 10 (freestyle) points.
- SP – Technical superiority – the loser with technical points and a margin of victory of at least 8 (Greco-Roman) or 10 (freestyle) points.

Men's freestyle

Athlete	Event	Qualification	Round of 16	Quarterfinal	Semifinal	Repechage 1	Repechage 2	Final / BM	
Athlete	Event	Opposition Result	Opposition Result	Opposition Result	Opposition Result	Opposition Result	Opposition Result	Opposition Result	Rank
Nurislam Sanayev	−57 kg	Bye	Khinchegasvili (GEO); L 1–3 ^{PP}	Did not advance		Bye	Aliyev (AZE); L 1–3 ^{PP}	Did not advance	12
Galymzhan Usserbayev	−74 kg	Nedealco (MDA); W 4–1 ^{SP}	López (CUB); W 3–1 ^{PP}	Takatani (JPN); W 3–1 ^{PP}	Yazdani (IRI); L 0–4 ^{ST}	Bye		Demirtaş (TUR); L 0–3 ^{PO}	5
Aslan Kakhidze	−86 kg	Mahamedau (BLR); L 1–3 ^{PP}	Did not advance						12
Mamed Ibragimov	−97 kg	Bye	Díaz (VEN); W 4–0 ^{ST}	Odikadze (GEO); L 1–3 ^{PP}	Did not advance				8
Daulet Shabanbay	−125 kg	Bye	Saidau (BLR); L 0–3 ^{PO}	Did not advance					17

Men's Greco-Roman

Athlete	Event	Qualification	Round of 16	Quarterfinal	Semifinal	Repechage 1	Repechage 2	Final / BM	
Athlete	Event	Opposition Result	Opposition Result	Opposition Result	Opposition Result	Opposition Result	Opposition Result	Opposition Result	Rank
Almat Kebispayev	−59 kg	Labazanov (RUS); W 3–0 ^{PO}	Ota (JPN); L 0–3 ^{PO}	Did not advance		Sourian (IRI); W 5–0 ^{VT}	Berge (NOR); L 0–3 ^{PO}	Did not advance	7
Doszhan Kartikov	−75 kg	Datunashvili (GEO); W 3–0 ^{PO}	Mursaliyev (AZE); L 1–3 ^{PP}	Did not advance					10
Nurmakhan Tinaliyev	−130 kg	Bye	Popp (GER); L 1–3 ^{PP}	Did not advance					14

Women's freestyle

Athlete	Event	Qualification	Round of 16	Quarterfinal	Semifinal	Repechage 1	Repechage 2	Final / BM	
Athlete	Event	Opposition Result	Opposition Result	Opposition Result	Opposition Result	Opposition Result	Opposition Result	Opposition Result	Rank
Zhuldyz Eshimova	−48 kg	Bye	Tosaka (JPN); L 0–3 ^{PO}	Did not advance		Bye	Augello (USA); W 3–1 ^{PP}	Sun Yn (CHN); L 0–4 ^{ST}	5
Yekaterina Larionova	−63 kg	Bye	Mamashuk (BLR); L 1–3 ^{PP}	Did not advance		Bye	Johansson (SWE); W 5–0 ^{VT}	Pirozhkova (USA); W 5–0 ^{VT}	3rd place, bronze medalist(s)
Elmira Syzdykova	−69 kg	Bye	Vorobieva (RUS); L 1–3 ^{PP}	Did not advance		Bye	Ochirbat (MGL); W 3–1 ^{PP}	Mostafa (EGY); W 3–1 ^{PP}	3rd place, bronze medalist(s)
Guzel Manyurova	−75 kg	Bye	Németh (HUN); W 4–1 ^{SP}	Ali (CMR); W 3–1 ^{PP}	Bukina (RUS); W 5–0 ^{VT}	Bye		Wiebe (CAN); L 0–3 ^{PO}	2nd place, silver medalist(s)

== See also ==
- Kazakhstan at the 2016 Summer Paralympics
