= Uzbekistan at the 2016 Summer Olympics =

- IOC code: UZB
- NOC: National Olympic Committee of the Republic of Uzbekistan
- Website: www.olympic.uz (in Uzbek and English)

in Rio de Janeiro
- Competitors: 70 in 13 sports
- Flag bearers: Bakhodir Jalolov (opening); Bektemir Melikuziev (closing)
- Medals Ranked 21st: Gold 4 Silver 2 Bronze 7 Total 13

Summer Olympics appearances (overview)
- 1996; 2000; 2004; 2008; 2012; 2016; 2020; 2024; 2028

Other related appearances
- Russian Empire (1900–1912); Soviet Union (1952–1988); Unified Team (1992)

Uzbekistan competed at the 2016 Summer Olympics in Rio de Janeiro, Brazil, from 5 to 21 August 2016. This was the nation's sixth consecutive appearance at the Summer Olympics in the post-Soviet era.

The National Olympic Committee of the Republic of Uzbekistan fielded a team of 70 athletes, 47 men and 23 women, across 15 sports at the Games. It was the nation's second-largest delegation sent to the Olympics, just a single athlete short of the record achieved in Sydney 2000 (71). Uzbekistan made its Olympic debut in women's boxing, men's table tennis, and the rhythmic gymnastics group all-around, as well as returning to artistic gymnastics, women's judo, and rowing after their absence from London 2012.

Leading the Uzbek roster lineup were Oksana Chusovitina, who created history as the oldest ever female gymnast (aged 41) and the first to participate in a record seventh Olympics, and Ekaterina Khilko, who became the only trampolinist to be featured in every Olympic competition since her sport was added to the program in Sydney 2000. Chusovitina's fellow gymnast Anton Fokin, along with judo legends Rishod Sobirov and Abdullo Tangriev, also highlighted the Uzbek team for being the only medalists returning to these Games.

Other notable athletes on the Uzbek roster included world's top-ranked taekwondo fighter Dmitriy Shokin in the men's +80 kg division, American-based freestyle wrestler and Asian Games champion Bekzod Abdurakhmonov (men's 74 kg), tennis player Denis Istomin, Asia's top female high jumper Svetlana Radzivil, and super heavyweight boxer Bakhodir Jalolov, who was nominated by the committee as the nation's flag bearer in the opening ceremony.

Uzbekistan left Rio de Janeiro with a total of 13 medals (4 gold, 2 silver, and 7 bronze), signifying the nation's most successful outcome in Olympic history. Seven of these medals won by the Uzbeks came from boxing, including three golds. The remainder of the nation's overall tally were awarded to the team in weightlifting, wrestling, and judo. Among the medalists were Hasanboy Dusmatov, who became the nation's second boxer in history to claim an Olympic gold since Mahammatkodir Abdullaev topped the podium in 2000, Ruslan Nurudinov, who successfully set a new Olympic clean and jerk record to hand the Uzbeks its first ever weightlifting title, and Sobirov, who wrapped up his judo career by achieving a bronze-medal feat for the third straight time, before retiring from the sport.

== Medalists ==
The following Uzbek competitors won medals at the Games. In the discipline sections below, medalists' names are bolded.

Medal	Name	Sport	Event	Date
Gold	Hasanboy Dusmatov	Boxing	Men's 49 kg	August 14
Gold	Ruslan Nurudinov	Weightlifting	Men's 105 kg	August 15
Gold	Shakhobidin Zoirov	Boxing	Men's 52 kg	August 21
Gold	Fazliddin Gaibnazarov	Boxing	Men's 64 kg	August 21
Silver	Shakhram Giyasov	Boxing	Men's 69 kg	August 17
Silver	Bektemir Melikuziev	Boxing	Men's 75 kg	August 20
Bronze	Diyorbek Urozboev	Judo	Men's 60 kg	August 6
Bronze	Rishod Sobirov	Judo	Men's 66 kg	August 7
Bronze	Rustam Tulaganov	Boxing	Men's 91 kg	August 13
Bronze	Elmurat Tasmuradov	Wrestling	Men's 59 kg	August 14
Bronze	Murodjon Akhmadaliev	Boxing	Men's 56 kg	August 18
Bronze	Ikhtiyor Navruzov	Wrestling	Men's freestyle 65 kg	August 21
Bronze	Magomed Ibragimov	Wrestling	Men's freestyle 97 kg	August 21

**Medals by sport**
**Sport**	1st place, gold medalist(s)	2nd place, silver medalist(s)	3rd place, bronze medalist(s)	**Total**
Boxing	3	2	2	7
Judo	0	0	2	2
Weightlifting	1	0	0	1
Wrestling	0	0	3	3
**Total**	**4**	**2**	**7**	**13**

**Medals by day**
**Day**	1st place, gold medalist(s)	2nd place, silver medalist(s)	3rd place, bronze medalist(s)	**Total**
August 6	0	0	1	1
August 7	0	0	1	1
August 13	0	0	1	1
August 14	1	0	1	2
August 15	1	0	0	1
August 17	0	1	0	1
August 18	0	0	1	1
August 20	0	1	0	1
August 21	2	0	2	4
**Total**	**4**	**2**	**7**	**13**

**Medals by gender**
**Gender**	1st place, gold medalist(s)	2nd place, silver medalist(s)	3rd place, bronze medalist(s)	**Total**
Male	4	2	7	13
Female	0	0	0	0
**Total**	**4**	**2**	**7**	**13**

== Competitors ==
The following is the list of number of competitors participating in the Games:

Sport	Men	Women	Total
Athletics	6	10	16
Boxing	10	1	11
Canoeing	3	1	4
Gymnastics	1	8	9
Judo	7	1	8
Rowing	1	0	1
Shooting	1	0	1
Swimming	1	1	2
Table tennis	1	0	1
Taekwondo	2	1	3
Tennis	1	0	1
Weightlifting	5	0	5
Wrestling	8	0	8
Total	47	23	70

== Athletics ==
Uzbek athletes have so far achieved qualifying standards in the following athletics events (up to a maximum of 3 athletes in each event):

Key

- Note–Ranks given for track events are within the athlete's heat only
- Q = Qualified for the next round
- q = Qualified for the next round as a fastest loser or, in field events, by position without achieving the qualifying target
- NR = National record
- N/A = Round not applicable for the event
- Bye = Athlete not required to compete in round

Track & road events
Men

Athlete	Event	Final	
Athlete	Event	Result	Rank
Andrey Petrov	Marathon	DNF	

Women

Athlete	Event	Heat		Quarterfinal		Semifinal		Final	
Athlete	Event	Result	Rank	Result	Rank	Result	Rank	Result	Rank
Nataliya Asanova	400 m hurdles	1:02.37	8	—N/a		Did not advance			
Sitora Hamidova	10000 m	—N/a						31:57.77 NR	24
Sitora Hamidova	Marathon	—N/a						2:39:45	54
Marina Khmelevskaya	Marathon	—N/a						2:45:06	77
Valentina Kibalnikova	100 m hurdles	13.29	6	—N/a		Did not advance			
Nigina Sharipova	100 m	Bye		11.68	6	Did not advance			
Nigina Sharipova	200 m	23.33	6	—N/a		Did not advance			
Ekaterina Tunguskova	10000 m	—N/a						DNF	

Field events
Men

Athlete	Event	Qualification		Final	
Athlete	Event	Distance	Position	Distance	Position
Suhrob Khodjaev	Hammer throw	70.11	23	Did not advance	
Ruslan Kurbanov	Triple jump	NM	—	Did not advance	
Bobur Shokirjonov	Javelin throw	NM	—	Did not advance	
Ivan Zaytsev	Javelin throw	77.83	26	Did not advance	

Women

Athlete	Event	Qualification		Final	
Athlete	Event	Distance	Position	Distance	Position
Nadiya Dusanova	High jump	1.92	20	Did not advance	
Svetlana Radzivil	High jump	1.94	=1 Q	1.88	13
Yuliya Tarasova	Long jump	6.16	29	Did not advance	

Combined events – Men's decathlon

Athlete	Event	100 m	LJ	SP	HJ	400 m	110H	DT	PV	JT	1500 m	Final	Rank
Leonid Andreev	Result	11.29	6.60	14.86	DNS	—	—	—	—	—	—	DNF	
Leonid Andreev	Points	797	720	781	0	—	—	—	—	—	—	DNF	

Combined events – Women's heptathlon

Athlete	Event	100H	HJ	SP	200 m	LJ	JT	800 m	Final	Rank
Ekaterina Voronina	Result	15.21	1.65	DNS	—	—	—	—	DNF	
Ekaterina Voronina	Points	814	795	0	—	—	—	—	DNF	

== Boxing ==
Uzbekistan has entered eleven boxers to compete in each of the following weight classes into the Olympic boxing tournament. 2012 Olympian Hurshid Tojibaev was the only Uzbek finishing among the top two of his respective division in the AIBA Pro Boxing series, while three further boxers (Akhmadaliev, Gaibnazarov, and Melikuziev) qualified through the 2015 World Championships.

Seven further boxers (Dusmatov, Zoirov, Giyasov, Rasulov, Tulaganov, Jalolov, and Mirzaeva) had claimed their Olympic spots at the 2016 Asia & Oceania Qualification Tournament in Qian'an, China.

Men

Athlete	Event	Round of 32	Round of 16	Quarterfinals	Semifinals	Final	
Athlete	Event	Opposition Result	Opposition Result	Opposition Result	Opposition Result	Opposition Result	Rank
Hasanboy Dusmatov	Light flyweight	Bye	Velázquez (MEX); W 3–0	Zhakypov (KAZ); W 3–0	Hernández (USA); W 3–0	Martinez (COL); W 3–0	1st place, gold medalist(s)
Shakhobidin Zoirov	Flyweight	Irvine (IRL); W 3–0	Vargas (USA); W 3–0	Mamishzada (AZE); W 3–0	Finol (VEN); W 3–0	Aloyan (RUS); W 3–0	1st place, gold medalist(s)
Murodjon Akhmadaliev	Bantamweight	Bye	Yeraliyev (KAZ); W 3–0	Melián (ARG); W TKO	Ramírez (CUB); L 0–3	Did not advance	3rd place, bronze medalist(s)
Hurshid Tojibaev	Lightweight	Erşeker (QAT); W 3–0	Cordina (GBR); W 2–0	Conceição (BRA); L 0–3	Did not advance		
Fazliddin Gaibnazarov	Light welterweight	Malonga (CGO); W TKO	Kumar (IND); W 3–0	Russell (USA); W 2–1	Dunaytsev (RUS); W 2–1	Sotomayor (AZE); W 2–1	1st place, gold medalist(s)
Shakhram Giyasov	Welterweight	Sissokho (ESP); W 3–0	Stanionis (LTU); W 3–0	Iglesias (CUB); W 3–0	Rabii (MAR); W 3–0	Yeleussinov (KAZ); L 0–3	2nd place, silver medalist(s)
Bektemir Melikuziev	Middleweight	Bye	Lewis (AUS); W 3–0	Yadav (IND); W 3–0	Rodríguez (MEX); W 3–0	López (CUB); L 0–3	2nd place, silver medalist(s)
Elshod Rasulov	Light heavyweight	Bye	Buatsi (GBR); L KO	Did not advance			
Rustam Tulaganov	Heavyweight	Bye	Castillo (ECU); W 3–0	Abdullayev (AZE); W 3–0	Tishchenko (RUS); L 0–3	Did not advance	3rd place, bronze medalist(s)
Bakhodir Jalolov	Super heavyweight	Bye	Muñoz (VEN); W TKO	Joyce (GBR); L 0–3	Did not advance		

Women

Athlete	Event	Round of 16	Quarterfinals	Semifinals	Final	
Athlete	Event	Opposition Result	Opposition Result	Opposition Result	Opposition Result	Rank
Yodgoroy Mirzaeva	Flyweight	Bujold (CAN); L 0–3	did not advance			

== Canoeing ==
=== Sprint ===
Uzbek canoeists have qualified four boats in each of the following distances for the Games through the 2015 Asian Canoe Sprint Championships in Palembang, Indonesia.

Athlete	Event	Heats		Semifinals		Final	
Athlete	Event	Time	Rank	Time	Rank	Time	Rank
Gerasim Kochnev	Men's C-1 1000 m	4:08.127	2 Q	3:59.489	3 FA	4:04.205	7
Aleksey Mochalov	Men's K-1 1000 m	3:34.469	4 Q	3:36.968	5 FB	3:34.807	12
Gerasim Kochnev; Serik Mirbekov	Men's C-2 1000 m	4:00.330	6 Q	3:40.772	2 FA	3:52.920	8
Olga Umaralieva	Women's K-1 200 m	42.525	7	Did not advance			

Qualification Legend: FA = Qualify to final (medal); FB = Qualify to final B (non-medal)

== Gymnastics ==
=== Artistic ===
Uzbekistan has entered two artistic gymnasts into the Olympic competition. Beijing 2008 bronze medalist Anton Fokin, and seven-time Olympian Oksana Chusovitina had claimed their Olympic spots each in the men's and women's apparatus and all-around events, respectively, at the Olympic Test Event in Rio de Janeiro.

Men

Athlete	Event	Qualification								Final							
Athlete	Event	Apparatus						Total	Rank	Apparatus						Total	Rank
Athlete	Event	F	PH	R	V	PB	HB	Total	Rank	F	PH	R	V	PB	HB	Total	Rank
Anton Fokin	All-around	11.800	14.333	13.966	14.400	15.466	13.866	83.831	37	Did not advance							

Women

Athlete	Event	Qualification						Final					
Athlete	Event	Apparatus				Total	Rank	Apparatus				Total	Rank
Athlete	Event	V	UB	BB	F	Total	Rank	V	UB	BB	F	Total	Rank
Oksana Chusovitina	Vault	14.999	—N/a			14.999	5 Q	14.833	—N/a			14.833	7
Oksana Chusovitina	Balance beam	—N/a		13.300	—N/a	13.300	16	Did not advance					

=== Rhythmic ===
Uzbekistan has qualified a squad of rhythmic gymnasts in both individual and group all-around for the Games by claiming one of eight available Olympic spots (for individual) and three (for group) at the Olympic Test Event in Rio de Janeiro.

Athlete	Event	Qualification						Final					
Athlete	Event	Hoop	Ball	Clubs	Ribbon	Total	Rank	Hoop	Ball	Clubs	Ribbon	Total	Rank
Anastasiya Serdyukova	Individual	17.166	17.100	17.316	16.908	68.490	17	Did not advance					

Athlete	Event	Qualification				Final			
Athlete	Event	5 ribbons	3 clubs 2 hoops	Total	Rank	5 ribbons	3 clubs 2 hoops	Total	Rank
Samira Amirova; Valeriya Davidova; Luiza Ganieva; Zarina Kurbonova; Marta Rostoburova	Team	14.416	16.750	31.160	12	Did not advance			

=== Trampoline ===
Uzbekistan has qualified one gymnast in the women's trampoline by virtue of a top six finish at the 2016 Olympic Test Event in Rio de Janeiro.

Athlete	Event	Qualification		Final	
Athlete	Event	Score	Rank	Score	Rank
Ekaterina Khilko	Women's	97.525	12	Did not advance	

== Judo ==
Uzbekistan has qualified a total of eight judokas for each of the following weight classes at the Games. Six men, led by two-time Olympic medalist Rishod Sobirov and Beijing 2008 runner-up Abdullo Tangriev, were ranked among the top 22 eligible judokas in the IJF World Ranking List of May 30, 2016. Gulnoza Matniyazova at women's middleweight (70 kg) earned a continental quota spot from the Asian region, as the highest-ranked Uzbek judoka outside of direct qualifying position, while Soyib Kurbanov at men's half-heavyweight (100 kg) received the unused place from IJF as the highest-ranked judoka, not yet qualified, across all continents on the list, as Oceania failed to fulfill its continental allocation.

Men

Athlete	Event	Round of 64	Round of 32	Round of 16	Quarterfinals	Semifinals	Repechage	Final / BM	
Athlete	Event	Opposition Result	Opposition Result	Opposition Result	Opposition Result	Opposition Result	Opposition Result	Opposition Result	Rank
Diyorbek Urozboev	−60 kg	Bye	Katz (AUS); W 010–000	Chammartin (SUI); W 011–000	Smetov (KAZ); L 000–001	Did not advance	Kitadai (BRA); W 100–000	Papinashvili (GEO); W 001–000	3rd place, bronze medalist(s)
Rishod Sobirov	−66 kg	Bye	Shershan (BLR); W 001–000	Mata (ARU); W 100–000	An B-u (KOR); L 000–010	Did not advance	Mateo (DOM); W 100–000	Gomboč (SLO); W 110–000	3rd place, bronze medalist(s)
Mirali Sharipov	−73 kg	Bye	Elmont (NED); L 000–010	Did not advance					
Shakhzodbek Sabirov	−81 kg	Bye	Naulu (FIJ); W 100–001	Stevens (USA); L 000–101	Did not advance				
Sherali Juraev	−90 kg	Benamadi (ALG); W 110–000	Nyman (SWE); L 001–101	Did not advance					
Soyib Kurbonov	−100 kg	Bloshenko (UKR); L 000–100	Did not advance						
Abdullo Tangriev	+100 kg	—N/a	Sua (SAM); W 100–000	Natea (ROU); W 110–000	Krakovetskii (KGZ); W 100–001	Harasawa (JPN); L 000–101	Bye	R Silva (BRA); L 000–001	5

Women

Athlete	Event	Round of 32	Round of 16	Quarterfinals	Semifinals	Repechage	Final / BM	
Athlete	Event	Opposition Result	Opposition Result	Opposition Result	Opposition Result	Opposition Result	Opposition Result	Rank
Gulnoza Matniyazova	−70 kg	Kłys (POL); L 000–000 S	Did not advance					

== Rowing ==
Uzbekistan has qualified one boat in the men's single sculls for the Olympics at the 2016 Asia & Oceania Continental Qualification Regatta in Chungju, South Korea.

Athlete	Event	Heats		Repechage		Quarterfinals		Semifinals		Final	
Athlete	Event	Time	Rank	Time	Rank	Time	Rank	Time	Rank	Time	Rank
Shakhboz Kholmirzayev	Men's single sculls	7:25.03	4 R	7:14:58	2 QF	7:09.99	6 SC/D	7:26.04	4 FD	7:04.78	22

Qualification Legend: FA=Final A (medal); FB=Final B (non-medal); FC=Final C (non-medal); FD=Final D (non-medal); FE=Final E (non-medal); FF=Final F (non-medal); SA/B=Semifinals A/B; SC/D=Semifinals C/D; SE/F=Semifinals E/F; QF=Quarterfinals; R=Repechage

== Shooting ==
Uzbekistan has received a wildcard invitation from ISSF to send 2014 Asian Youth champion Vadim Skorovarov in the men's air rifle to the Olympics, as long as the minimum qualifying score (MQS) was met by March 31, 2016.

Athlete	Event	Qualification		Final	
Athlete	Event	Points	Rank	Points	Rank
Vadim Skorovarov	Men's 10 m air rifle	620.9	27	Did not advance	

Qualification Legend: Q = Qualify for the next round; q = Qualify for the bronze medal (shotgun)

== Swimming ==
Uzbek swimmers have so far achieved qualifying standards in the following events (up to a maximum of 2 swimmers in each event at the Olympic Qualifying Time (OQT), and potentially 1 at the Olympic Selection Time (OST)):

Athlete	Event	Heat		Semifinal		Final	
Athlete	Event	Time	Rank	Time	Rank	Time	Rank
Vladislav Mustafin	Men's 100 m breaststroke	1:01.66	34	Did not advance			
Ranohon Amanova	Women's 200 m individual medley	2:18.97	38	Did not advance			
Ranohon Amanova	Women's 400 m individual medley	4:52.15	33	—N/a		Did not advance	

== Table tennis ==
Uzbekistan has entered one athlete into the table tennis competition at the Games for the second time (the first being done in 2004). Zokhid Kenjaev scored a second-stage draw victory to book one of six remaining Olympic spots in the men's singles at the Asian Qualification Tournament in Hong Kong.

Athlete	Event	Preliminary	Round 1	Round 2	Round 3	Round of 16	Quarterfinals	Semifinals	Final / BM	
Athlete	Event	Opposition Result	Opposition Result	Opposition Result	Opposition Result	Opposition Result	Opposition Result	Opposition Result	Opposition Result	Rank
Zokhid Kenjaev	Men's singles	Bye	Jančařík (CZE); W 4–2	Pitchford (GBR); L 1–4	Did not advance					

== Taekwondo ==
Uzbekistan entered one athlete into the taekwondo competition at the Olympics. 2015 World champion Dmitriy Shokin qualified automatically for the men's heavyweight category (+80 kg) by finishing in the top 6 WTF Olympic rankings. Meanwhile, Nikita Rafalovich and Nigora Tursunkulova secured spots on the Uzbek team by virtue of their top two finish in the men's (80 kg) and women's welterweight category (67 kg), respectively, at the 2016 Asian Qualification Tournament in Manila, Philippines.

Athlete	Event	Round of 16	Quarterfinals	Semifinals	Repechage	Final / BM	
Athlete	Event	Opposition Result	Opposition Result	Opposition Result	Opposition Result	Opposition Result	Rank
Nikita Rafalovich	Men's −80 kg	Oueslati (TUN); L 8–11	Did not advance				
Dmitriy Shokin	Men's +80 kg	Qiao S (CHN); W 15–8	Castillo (CUB); W 1–1 SUP	Issoufou (NIG); L 2–8	Bye	Cha D-m (KOR); L 3–4	5
Nigora Tursunkulova	Women's −67 kg	Johansson (SWE); W 2–2 SUP	Azizova (AZE); L 1–5	Did not advance			

== Tennis ==
Uzbekistan has entered one tennis player into the Olympic tournament. London 2012 Olympian Denis Istomin (world no. 64) qualified directly for the men's singles as one of the top 56 eligible players in the ATP World Rankings as of June 6, 2016.

Athlete	Event	Round of 64	Round of 32	Round of 16	Quarterfinals	Semifinals	Final / BM	
Athlete	Event	Opposition Score	Opposition Score	Opposition Score	Opposition Score	Opposition Score	Opposition Score	Rank
Denis Istomin	Men's singles	Ferrer (ESP); L 2–6, 1–6	Did not advance					

== Weightlifting ==
Uzbek weightlifters have qualified five men's quota places for the Rio Olympics based on their combined team standing by points at the 2014 and 2015 IWF World Championships. A single women's Olympic spot had been added to the Uzbek roster by virtue of a top six national finish at the 2016 Asian Championships (April 22 to 30), but the International Weightlifting Federation had decided to remove it two months later because of "multiple positive cases" of doping throughout the qualifying period. The team must allocate these places to individual athletes by June 20, 2016.

Athlete	Event	Snatch		Clean & jerk		Total	Rank
Athlete	Event	Result	Rank	Result	Rank	Total	Rank
Doston Yokubov	Men's −69 kg	137	17	176	11	313	15
Ivan Efremov	Men's −105 kg	194	=1	220	6	414	5
Ruslan Nurudinov	Men's −105 kg	194	=1	237 OR	1	431	1st place, gold medalist(s)
Rustam Djangabaev	Men's +105 kg	195	=5	237	7	432	6
Sardorbek Dustmurotov	Men's +105 kg	179	19	232	=9	411	11

== Wrestling ==
Uzbekistan has qualified eight wrestlers for each of the following weight classes into the Olympic competition. Two of them finished among the top six to book Olympic spots in the men's freestyle 65 kg and men's Greco-Roman 85 kg, respectively, at the 2015 World Championships, while one more place had been awarded to the Uzbek wrestler, who progressed to the top two finals at the 2016 Asian Qualification Tournament.

Five further wrestlers had claimed the remaining Olympic slots to round out the Uzbek roster in separate World Qualification Tournaments; three of them at the initial meet in Ulaanbaatar and two more at the final meet in Istanbul.

Key:

- VT – Victory by Fall.
- VB – Victory by injury.
- PP – Decision by Points – the loser with technical points.
- PO – Decision by Points – the loser without technical points.
- ST – Technical superiority – the loser without technical points and a margin of victory of at least 8 (Greco-Roman) or 10 (freestyle) points.
- SP – Technical superiority – the loser with technical points and a margin of victory of at least 8 (Greco-Roman) or 10 (freestyle) points.

Athlete	Event	Qualification	Round of 16	Quarterfinal	Semifinal	Repechage 1	Repechage 2	Final / BM	
Athlete	Event	Opposition Result	Opposition Result	Opposition Result	Opposition Result	Opposition Result	Opposition Result	Opposition Result	Rank
Men's Freestyle
Abbos Rakhmonov	−57 kg	Bonne (CUB); L 0–4 ^{ST}	Did not advance						18
Ikhtiyor Navruzov	−65 kg	Bye	Batirov (BRN); W 3–1 ^{PP}	Gómez (PUR); W 3–1 ^{PP}	Ramonov (RUS); L 1–4 ^{SP}	Bye		Ganzorig (MGL); W 3–1 ^{PP}	3rd place, bronze medalist(s)
Bekzod Abdurakhmonov	−74 kg	Bye	Geduev (RUS); L 1–3^{PP}	Did not advance		Bye	Burroughs (USA); W 4–1 ^{SP}	Hasanov (AZE); L 1–3 ^{PP}	5
Magomed Ibragimov	−97 kg	Buassat (GBS); W 5–0 ^{VB}	Tamarau (NGR); W 4–0 ^{ST}	Gazyumov (AZE); L 1–3 ^{PP}	Did not advance	Bye	Yazdani (IRI); W 5–0 ^{VT}	Andriitsev (UKR); W 3–1 ^{PP}	3rd place, bronze medalist(s)
Men's Greco-Roman
Elmurat Tasmuradov	−59 kg	Bye	Fris (SRB); W 3–1 ^{PP}	Yun W-c (PRK); W 3–0 ^{PO}	Borrero (CUB); L 1–3 ^{PP}	Bye		Eraliev (KGZ); W 3–1 ^{PP}	3rd place, bronze medalist(s)
Dilshod Turdiev	−75 kg	Bye	Nemeš (SRB); L 1–3 ^{PP}	Did not advance					14
Rustam Assakalov	−85 kg	Bye	Provisor (USA); W 3–1 ^{PP}	V Lőrincz (HUN); L 1–3 ^{PP}	Did not advance				8
Muminjon Abdullaev	−130 kg	Bye	Semenov (RUS); L 0–3 ^{PO}	Did not advance					15

== See also ==
- Uzbekistan at the 2016 Summer Paralympics
