= Roy Korving =

Dutch boxer (born 1995)

Personal information
- Nationality: Dutch
- Born: 5 June 1995 (age 31) Zoetermeer, Netherlands
- Height: 6 ft 3 in (1.91 m)
- Weight: Heavyweight

Boxing career
- Stance: Southpaw
Medal record
Men's amateur boxing
Representing Netherlands
European Championships
Bronze medal – third place	2017 Kharkiv	Heavyweight

Roy Korving (born 5 June 1995) is a Dutch former amateur boxer. He won a bronze medal at the 2017 European Championships as a heavyweight, and competed at two editions of the World Championships.

== Amateur career ==
Before boxing, Korving played association football in the youth systems of CVV Be Fair and VV Waddinxveen. However, a serious injury made him quit football and he eventually started boxing after doing a trial lesson.

Korving represented his country in a continental competition for the first time at the 2013 European Youth Championships in Rotterdam. He moved up to the highest age group in amateur boxing, the senior division the following year. The 19-year-old immediately won a gold medal at the German Senior National Championships in the heavyweight class, defeating reigning champion Johan Visscher in the finals.

After taking first at a tournament in Helsinki in March 2015, he won another gold two months later at the Algirdas Socikas Tournament in Kaunas, where he impressed by beating European Youth Championship silver medalist Adam Hamori in the semi-finals. He won two fights before falling to Tervel Pulev in the quarter-finals of that year's European Championships. He also participated in his first World Championships in Doha, but was eliminated by the eventual gold medalist, Evgeny Tishchenko, in his second bout.

In March 2016, Korving won the prestigious Chemistry Cup in Germany. After a quick elimination from the 2016 European Olympic Qualification Tournament at the hands of the eventual winner Lawrence Okolie, his last chance at qualifying for the 2016 Summer Olympics was winning the 2016 World Olympic Qualifying Tournament in Baku. He won his first two matches, decisions against Commonwealth Games medalists David Nyika and Efetobor Apochi, respectively, before he was defeated by Julio Castillo in the semi-finals.

In 2017, he won a bronze medal at the European Championships in Kharkiv after losing his semi-final bout to Englishman Cheavon Clarke. This qualified him for another appearance at the World Championships five months later, although he lost in his second bout. In 2018, Korving defeated two-time European Championship silver medalist and international teammate Peter Müllenberg in the finals of the Senior National Championships. He repeated this feat the following year, decisioning Kilat Hallie for his fourth consecutive national heavyweight title.

He was inducted into the 2018–2019 class of the Waddinxveen Hall of Fame. In April 2019, after 111 official amateur bouts, a 23-year-old Korving suddenly retired from the sport. He cited the difficulty of balancing boxing with his work as a fireman with the Royal Netherlands Air Force at Woensdrecht Air Base, as well as frustration with the NOC*NSF over a lack of financial support.

=== Amateur results ===
- 2012 Junior National Championships in Netherlands (light heavyweight) (gold)
- 2012 Sokolov Youth Cup in Sokolov, Czech Republic (heavyweight)
  - Defeated Martin Novak (Czech Republic) PTS (gold)
- 2013 Youth National Championships in Netherlands (light heavyweight) (gold)
- 2013 Dan Pozniak Youth Cup in Vilnius, Lithuania (light heavyweight)
  - Defeated Algirdas Baniulis (Lithuania) 18–5
  - Lost to Oleksandr Khyzhniak (Ukraine) 9–18 (bronze)
- 2013 Brandenburg Youth Cup in Frankfurt, Germany (light heavyweight)
  - Defeated Michael Gallagher (Ireland) 3–0
  - Lost to Melvin Perry (Germany) 0–3 (bronze)
- 2013 Mostar Youth Tournament in Mostar, Bosnia and Herzegovina (light heavyweight)
  - Defeated Paul Burns (Scotland) 5–0
  - Defeated Semir Bajrovic (Montenegro) 5–0
  - Defeated David Semion Dabo (Croatia) PTS (gold)
- 2013 European Youth Championships in Rotterdam, Netherlands (light heavyweight)
  - Defeated Polyneikis Kalamaras (Greece) PTS
  - Defeated Michael Gallagher (Ireland) 3–0
  - Lost to Adam Hamori (Hungary) PTS
- 2014 Grand Prix in Ústí nad Labem, Czech Republic (heavyweight)
  - Defeated Daniel Taborsky (Czech Republic) 3–0
  - Lost to Levan Guledani (Georgia) WO (bronze)
- 2014 National Championships in Rotterdam, Netherlands (heavyweight)
  - Defeated Ricardo Snijders 2–1
  - Defeated Johan Visscher 3–0 (gold)
- 2015 Gee-Bee Tournament in Helsinki, Finland (heavyweight)
  - Defeated Tomi Honka (Finland) 3–0
  - Defeated Arbek Abduganiyev (Kazakhstan) 3–0 (gold)
- 2015 Beogradski Pobednik in Belgrade, Serbia (heavyweight)
  - Defeated Andrej Pesic (Serbia) TKO1
  - Lost to Marko Calic (Croatia) TKOI2 (bronze)
- 2015 Algirdas Socikas Tournament in Kaunas, Lithuania (heavyweight)
  - Defeated Jim Andreasen (Denmark) 3–0
  - Defeated Adam Hamori (Hungary) 3–0
  - Defeated Rain Karlson (Estonia) 3–0 (gold)
- 2015 Chemistry Cup in Halle, Germany (heavyweight)
  - Lost to Paul Omba-Biongolo (France) TKOI1
- 2015 European Championships in Samokov, Bulgaria (heavyweight)
  - Defeated Pirro Quni (Kosovo) KO2
  - Defeated Kevin Melhus (Norway) 3–0
  - Lost to Tervel Pulev (Bulgaria) 0–3
- 2015 World Championships in Doha, Qatar (heavyweight)
  - Defeated Nikolajs Grisunins (Latvia) 3–0
  - Lost to Evgeny Tishchenko (Russia) 0–3
- 2016 Istvan Bocskai Memorial in Debrecen, Hungary (heavyweight)
  - Defeated Michal Plesnik (Slovakia) 3–0
  - Defeated Bence Nagy (Hungary) 2–0
  - Lost to Gergo Savoly (Hungary) 1–2 (silver)
- 2016 Chemistry Cup in Halle, Germany (heavyweight)
  - Defeated Igor Jakubowski (Poland) 3–0
  - Defeated Igor Teziev (Germany) WO
  - Defeated Sadam Magomedov (Russia) 2–1 (gold)
- 2016 European Olympic Qualification Tournament in Samsun, Turkey (heavyweight)
  - Lost to Lawrence Okolie (England) 1–2
- 2016 Eindhoven Box Cup in Eindhoven, Netherlands (heavyweight)
  - Defeated Joao Silva (Netherlands) TKO1
  - Defeated Hélio Silva (Portugal) 3–0
  - Defeated Mason Holmes (England) TKO (gold)
- 2016 World Olympic Qualification Tournament in Baku, Azerbaijan (heavyweight)
  - Defeated David Nyika (New Zealand) 3–0
  - Defeated Efetobor Apochi (Nigeria) 3–0
  - Lost to Julio Castillo (Ecuador) 0–3 (bronze)
- 2016 Chemnitz City Cup in Chemnitz, Germany (heavyweight)
  - Defeated Marcus Finke (Germany) KO1
  - Defeated Phillip Gruener (Germany) 2–1
  - Defeated Aleksandar Mraovic (Austria) 3–0 (gold)
- 2016 National Championships in Rotterdam, Netherlands (heavyweight)
  - Defeated Vernon Hoost WO
  - Defeated Kilat Hallie TKO3 (gold)
- 2017 European U-22 Championships in Brăila, Romania (heavyweight)
  - Defeated Denis Gaynov (Bulgaria) RSC2
  - Defeated Marek Vanecek (Czech Republic) 5–0
  - Lost Paul Omba-Biongolo (France) 0–5
- 2017 Feliks Stamm Memorial in Warsaw, Poland (heavyweight - Class A)
  - Defeated Mario Mackanic (Slovakia) 5–0
  - Defeated Paul Omba-Biongolo (France) 5–0
  - Defeated Erik Tlkanec (Slovakia) 5–0 (gold)
- 2017 National Championships in Rotterdam, Netherlands (heavyweight)
  - Defeated Tommaso Rossano (Italy) 5–0 (gold)
- 2017 European Championships in Kharkiv, Ukraine (heavyweight)
  - Defeated Nikoloz Begadze (Georgia) 5–0
  - Defeated Vladislav Smyaglikov (Belarus) 5–0
  - Lost to Cheavon Clarke (England) 0–5 (bronze)
- 2017 World Championships in Doha, Qatar (heavyweight)
  - Defeated Uladzislau Smiahlikau (Belarus) 3–2
  - Lost to Sanjar Tursunov (Uzbekistan) 1–4
- 2018 Chemistry Cup in Halle, Germany (heavyweight)
  - Defeated Naman Tanwar (India) 4–1
  - Defeated Eugen Weigel (Germany) WO
  - Lost to Erislandy Savón (Cuba) 0–5 (bronze)
- 2018 National Championships in Maastricht, Netherlands (heavyweight - Class A)
  - Defeated Peter Müllenberg PTS (gold)
- 2019 National Championships in Rotterdam, Netherlands (heavyweight)
  - Defeated Kilat Hallie 5–0 (gold)
- 2019 Grand Prix Slovenske Konjice in Slovenske Konjice, Slovenia (heavyweight)
  - Lost to Toni Filipi (Croatia) 0–3
- 2019 Gee-Bee Tournament in Helsinki, Finland (heavyweight)
  - Defeated Alexander Bwambale (Sweden) 5–0
  - Lost to Aibek Oralbay (Kazakhstan) 1–4 (bronze)
