= Gevorg Manukian =

Ukrainian male boxer

Personal information
- Nationality: Ukrainian
- Born: 28 July 1993 (age 33) Yerevan, Armenia
- Height: 1.86 m (6 ft 1 in)
- Weight: Heavyweight

Boxing career
Medal record
Men's amateur boxing
Representing Ukraine
World Championships
Bronze medal – third place	2015 Doha	Heavyweight
European Games
Silver medal – second place	2015 Baku	Heavyweight

Gevorg Manukian (Ukrainian: Геворг Манукян; Armenian: Գևորգ Մանուկյանborn; 28 July 1993 in Yerevan, Armenia) is an Armenian-born Ukrainian amateur boxer in the heavyweight division. He won a silver medal at the 2015 European Games as well as a bronze medal at the 2015 World Championships.

== Career ==
Manukian resides in Zaporizhzhia, Ukraine. He studied at the Hryhorii Skovoroda University in Pereiaslav. His first coach is H. Shchedrin. He was also coached by S. Katayev.

He is silver medalist of the 2011 European Youth Boxing Championships in Dublin and 2012 European U22 Boxing Championships in Kaliningrad. In 2014, Manukian became Ukrainian champion after he won in the final against Denys Poyatsyka. He is also 2013 Ukrainian bronze medalist.

Manukian achieved his first international success at the 2015 European Games in Baku. On his way to the final, he won against David Hošek from the Czech Republic, Kristiyan Dimitrov from Bulgaria, Darren O'Neill from Ireland and Josip Filipi from Croatia. He was not able to box against Abdulkadir Abdullayev from Azerbaijan in the final due to an injury and was awarded a silver medal. At the 2015 World Championships in Doha, he won against Igor Jakubowski from Poland and Vasiliy Levit from Kazakhstan, but lost in semifinals to Evgeny Tishchenko from Russia, thus securing a bronze medal.

In 2016, Manukian tried to qualify for the 2016 Summer Olympics. He first participated in the European Qualification Tournament in Samsun. There he defeated Tomi Honka from Finland and Gergő Sávoly from Hungary, but he lost to Paul Omba Biongolo from France in the semifinal and to Abdullayev from Azerbaijan (whom he was to meet in the European Games' final) in the Olympic box-off. Then he competed in the APB and WSB Olympic Qualifier in Vargas where he lost in the semifinal to Julio Cesar Castillo from Ecuador.
