= 2017 AIBA World Boxing Championships – Heavyweight =

Boxing competitions

Heavyweight at the 2017 AIBA World Boxing Championships
- Venue: Alsterdorfer Sporthalle
- Location: Hamburg, Germany
- Dates: 25 August–2 September
- Competitors: 21 from 21 nations

Medalists
gold medal	Erislandy Savón	Cuba
silver medal	Evgeny Tishchenko	Russia
bronze medal	Sanjar Tursunov	Uzbekistan
bronze medal	Vasily Levit	Kazakhstan

The Heavyweight competition at the 2017 AIBA World Boxing Championships was held from 25 August to 2 September 2017.

== Draw ==
=== Final ===
Final
2 September
(Russia) Evgeny Tishchenko	2
(Cuba) Erislandy Savón	3

=== Top half ===
First round
25 August
(China) Yu Fengkai	0
(Colombia) Deivis Julio	5
25 August
(Belarus) Uladzislau Smiahlikau	5
(Tajikistan) Jakhon Qurbonov	0
25 August
(Uzbekistan) Sanjar Tursunov	5
(Nicaragua) Jeffry Gonzalez	0

Second round
27 August
(Russia) Evgeny Tishchenko	4
(Colombia) Deivis Julio	1
27 August
(New Zealand) David Nyika	5
(Germany) Igor Teziev	0
27 August
(Netherlands) Roy Korving	3
(Belarus) Uladzislau Smiahlikau	2
27 August
(Uzbekistan) Sanjar Tursunov	4
(Argentina) Yamil Peralta	1

Quarterfinals
29 August
(Russia) Evgeny Tishchenko	4
(New Zealand) David Nyika	1
29 August
(Netherlands) Roy Korving	1
(Uzbekistan) Sanjar Tursunov	4

Semifinals
31 August
(Russia) Evgeny Tishchenko	5
(Uzbekistan) Sanjar Tursunov	0

=== Bottom half ===
First round
25 August
(Costa Rica) Anthony Solano	0
(Brazil) Juan Gonçalves	5
25 August
(Ukraine) Ramazan Muslimov	5
(Hungary) Ádám Hámori	0

Second round
27 August
(Kazakhstan) Vasily Levit	5
(Brazil) Juan Gonçalves	0
27 August
(Australia) Jason Whateley	3
(India) Sumit Sangwan	2
27 August
(England) Cheavon Clarke	w/o
(Angola) Tumba Silva
27 August
(Ukraine) Ramazan Muslimov	0
(Cuba) Erislandy Savón	5

Quarterfinals
29 August
(Kazakhstan) Vasily Levit	5
(Australia) Jason Whateley	0
29 August
(England) Cheavon Clarke
(Cuba) Erislandy Savón	TKO

Semifinals
31 August
(Kazakhstan) Vasily Levit	2
(Cuba) Erislandy Savón	3
