= Boxing at the 2016 Summer Olympics =

Boxing at the Games of the XXXI Olympiad
- Venue: Riocentro – Pavilion 6
- Dates: 6–21 August 2016
- No. of events: 13
- Competitors: 286 from 76 nations

The boxing tournaments at the 2016 Summer Olympics in Rio de Janeiro took place from 6 to 21 August 2016 at the Pavilion 6 of Riocentro. However, boxing at the games was overshadowed with controversy after there were doubts raised that results in certain bouts had been manipulated. These concerns were upheld in a report published in 2021.

== Competition format ==
On March 23, 2013, the Amateur International Boxing Association instituted significant changes to the format. The World Series of Boxing, AIBA's pro team league which started in 2010, already enabled team members to retain 2012 Olympic eligibility. The newer AIBA Pro Boxing Tournament, consisting of pros who signed 5-year contracts with AIBA and competed on pro cards leading up to the tournament, also provided a pathway for new pros to retain their Olympic eligibility and retain ties with national committees. The elimination of headgear for male boxers and the adoption of the "10-point must" scoring system further cleared the delineation between amateur and pro format.

Similar to the 2012 format, men competed in the following ten events:

- Light flyweight (49kg)
- Flyweight (52kg)
- Bantamweight (56kg)
- Lightweight (60kg)
- Light welterweight (64kg)
- Welterweight (69kg)
- Middleweight (75kg)
- Light heavyweight (81kg)
- Heavyweight (91kg)
- Super heavyweight (+91kg)

As for the women, they were eligible to compete in the following three events:

- Flyweight (51kg)
- Lightweight (60kg)
- Middleweight (75kg)

== Qualifying criteria ==
Each National Olympic Committee was permitted to enter up to one athlete in each event. Six places (five men and one woman) were reserved for the host nation Brazil, while the remaining places were allocated to the Tripartite Invitation Commission. Because non-AIBA professional boxers were eligible to compete for the first time at the Olympics, a total of thirty-seven places had been reserved and thereby distributed to pros; twenty were qualified through the AIBA Pro Boxing Series with two for each event, while seventeen through the World Series of Boxing. Each continent had a quota of places to be filled through the two amateur and semi-pro league tournaments.

Qualification events were:

- 2014–2015 World Series of Boxing (WSB) – The two top ranked boxers at the end of the 2014–2015 season in each weight category (except light flyweight, heavyweight, and super heavyweight with one each).
- 2014–2015 AIBA Pro Boxing (APB) World Ranking – The champion and world-ranked top challenger in each weight category of the APB World Ranking at the end of the first cycle in September 2015.
- 2015 AIBA World Boxing Championships – Doha, Qatar, 5–18 October – The top three boxers from five weight categories (bantamweight, lightweight, light welterweight, welterweight, and middleweight), the gold and silver medalists from three divisions (light flyweight, flyweight, and light heavyweight), and the champions in two heaviest classes (heavyweight and super heavyweight).
- 2016 AIBA Women's World Boxing Championships – Astana, Kazakhstan – The top four boxers in each weight category.
- 2016 APB and WSB Olympic Qualifier – The top three of the remaining boxers in each of the eight categories, and the champion in two heaviest classes.
- 2016 AIBA World Olympic Qualifying Tournament
- 2016 AIBA Continental Olympic Qualifiers (both men and women)

== Competition schedule ==
There were two sessions of competition on most days of the 2016 Olympics Boxing program, an afternoon session (A), starting at 11:00 BRT, and an evening session (E), starting at 17:00 BRT. Starting on August 17, days contained only one session, beginning at 14:00 BRT.

P	Preliminary rounds	¼	Quarterfinals	½	Semifinals	F	Final

Date →	Sat 6		Sun 7		Mon 8		Tue 9		Wed 10		Thu 11		Fri 12		Sat 13		Sun 14		Mon 15		Tue 16		Wed 17	Thu 18	Fri 19	Sat 20	Sun 21
Event ↓	A	E	A	E	A	E	A	E	A	E	A	E	A	E	A	E	A	E	A	E	A	E	A	A	A	A	A
Men's light flyweight	P				P				¼				½				F										
Men's flyweight															P				P				¼		½		F
Men's bantamweight									P		P						P				¼			½		F	
Men's lightweight	P		P				P						¼				½					F					
Men's light welterweight									P		P						P				¼				½		F
Men's welterweight			P		P						P				¼				½				F				
Men's middleweight					P		P						P						P					½		F	
Men's light heavyweight	P		P						P		P						¼				½			F			
Men's heavyweight	P				P				¼						½					F							
Men's super heavyweight							P								P						¼				½		F
Women's flyweight													P								¼			½		F	
Women's lightweight													P						¼				½		F		
Women's middleweight																	P						¼		½		F

== Participation ==
=== Participating nations ===
- Algeria (8)
- Argentina (7)
- Armenia (5)
- Australia (3)
- Azerbaijan (11)
- Belarus (3)
- Brazil (9)
- Bulgaria (3)
- Cameroon (4)
- Canada (3)
- Cape Verde (1)
- Central African Republic (1)
- China (11)
- Colombia (5)
- Republic of the Congo (2)
- Croatia (2)
- Cuba (10)
- Dominican Republic (2)
- Ecuador (4)
- Egypt (4)
- Federated States of Micronesia (1)
- Fiji (1)
- Finland (1)
- France (11)
- Germany (6)
- Ghana (1)
- Great Britain (12)
- Haiti (1)
- Honduras (1)
- Hungary (2)
- India (3)
- Iran (1)
- Iraq (1)
- Ireland (8)
- Italy (7)
- Japan (2)
- Jordan (2)
- Kazakhstan (12)
- Kenya (3)
- Kyrgyzstan (1)
- South Korea (1)
- Lesotho (2)
- Lithuania (2)
- Mauritius (2)
- Mexico (6)
- Mongolia (6)
- Morocco (10)
- Namibia (2)
- Netherlands (3)
- Nigeria (1)
- Panama (1)
- Papua New Guinea (1)
- Philippines (2)
- Poland (2)
- Puerto Rico (1)
- Qatar (2)
- Romania (1)
- Russia (11)
- Seychelles (1)
- Spain (2)
- Sweden (1)
- Chinese Taipei (2)
- Tajikistan (1)
- Thailand (5)
- Trinidad and Tobago (1)
- Tunisia (2)
- Turkey (6)
- Turkmenistan (1)
- Uganda (2)
- Ukraine (5)
- United States (8)
- Uzbekistan (11)
- Vanuatu (1)
- Venezuela (8)
- Virgin Islands (1)
- Zambia (1)

== Medalists ==
=== Men ===
Games	Gold	Silver	Bronze
Light flyweight	Hasanboy Dusmatov; Uzbekistan	Yuberjen Martínez; Colombia	Joahnys Argilagos; Cuba
Light flyweight	Hasanboy Dusmatov; Uzbekistan	Yuberjen Martínez; Colombia	Nico Hernández; United States
Flyweight^{[a]}	Shakhobidin Zoirov; Uzbekistan	Yoel Finol; Venezuela	Hu Jianguan; China
Bantamweight	Robeisy Ramírez; Cuba	Shakur Stevenson; United States	Vladimir Nikitin; Russia
Bantamweight	Robeisy Ramírez; Cuba	Shakur Stevenson; United States	Murodjon Akhmadaliev; Uzbekistan
Lightweight	Robson Conceição; Brazil	Sofiane Oumiha; France	Lázaro Álvarez; Cuba
Lightweight	Robson Conceição; Brazil	Sofiane Oumiha; France	Dorjnyambuugiin Otgondalai; Mongolia
Light welterweight	Fazliddin Gaibnazarov; Uzbekistan	Lorenzo Sotomayor; Azerbaijan	Vitaly Dunaytsev; Russia
Light welterweight	Fazliddin Gaibnazarov; Uzbekistan	Lorenzo Sotomayor; Azerbaijan	Artem Harutyunyan; Germany
Welterweight	Daniyar Yeleussinov; Kazakhstan	Shakhram Giyasov; Uzbekistan	Mohammed Rabii; Morocco
Welterweight	Daniyar Yeleussinov; Kazakhstan	Shakhram Giyasov; Uzbekistan	Souleymane Cissokho; France
Middleweight	Arlen López; Cuba	Bektemir Melikuziev; Uzbekistan	Misael Rodríguez; Mexico
Middleweight	Arlen López; Cuba	Bektemir Melikuziev; Uzbekistan	Kamran Shakhsuvarly; Azerbaijan
Light heavyweight	Julio César La Cruz; Cuba	Adilbek Niyazymbetov; Kazakhstan	Mathieu Bauderlique; France
Light heavyweight	Julio César La Cruz; Cuba	Adilbek Niyazymbetov; Kazakhstan	Joshua Buatsi; Great Britain
Heavyweight	Evgeny Tishchenko; Russia	Vasiliy Levit; Kazakhstan	Rustam Tulaganov; Uzbekistan
Heavyweight	Evgeny Tishchenko; Russia	Vasiliy Levit; Kazakhstan	Erislandy Savón; Cuba
Super heavyweight	Tony Yoka; France	Joe Joyce; Great Britain	Filip Hrgović; Croatia
Super heavyweight	Tony Yoka; France	Joe Joyce; Great Britain	Ivan Dychko; Kazakhstan

^{Men's flyweight} Misha Aloian of Russia originally won the silver medal, but was disqualified after he tested positive for Tuaminoheptane.

=== Women ===
Games	Gold	Silver	Bronze
Flyweight	Nicola Adams; Great Britain	Sarah Ourahmoune; France	Ren Cancan; China
Flyweight	Nicola Adams; Great Britain	Sarah Ourahmoune; France	Ingrit Valencia; Colombia
Lightweight	Estelle Mossely; France	Yin Junhua; China	Mira Potkonen; Finland
Lightweight	Estelle Mossely; France	Yin Junhua; China	Anastasia Belyakova; Russia
Middleweight	Claressa Shields; United States	Nouchka Fontijn; Netherlands	Dariga Shakimova; Kazakhstan
Middleweight	Claressa Shields; United States	Nouchka Fontijn; Netherlands	Li Qian; China

== Medal summary ==
=== Medal table ===
* Host nation (Brazil)

Rank	Nation	Gold	Silver	Bronze	Total
1	Uzbekistan	3	2	2	7
2	Cuba	3	0	3	6
3	France	2	2	2	6
4	Kazakhstan	1	2	2	5
5	Great Britain	1	1	1	3
5	United States	1	1	1	3
7	Russia	1	0	3	4
8	Brazil*	1	0	0	1
9	China	0	1	3	4
10	Colombia	0	1	2	3
11	Azerbaijan	0	1	1	2
12	Netherlands	0	1	0	1
12	Venezuela	0	1	0	1
14	Croatia	0	0	1	1
14	Finland	0	0	1	1
14	Germany	0	0	1	1
14	Mexico	0	0	1	1
14	Mongolia	0	0	1	1
14	Morocco	0	0	1	1
Totals (19 entries)		13	13	26	52

== Manipulated scorecards ==
A report published in 2021 into the judging at the Rio Olympics found that there were systemic attempts to change the outcome of certain bouts. It also found that the methods that were employed to exploit results had begun in the Olympic qualifying rounds. The boxing at Rio Olympics had been mired in controversy since they took place in 2016, in particular two results attracted attention (both involving Russian athletes being awarded dubious victories)

- the defeat of Kazakh Vasily Levit by Russian Evgeny Tishchenko in the men's heavyweight gold-medal fight drew jeers from the audience,
- the defeat of Irish boxer Michael Conlan by Russian Vladimir Nikitin in the men's bantamweight quarter-final, after which Conlan accused AIBA and the Russian team of cheating, even tweeting to Russian President Vladimir Putin "Hey Vlad, How much did they charge you bro??"

The AIBA removed an unspecified number of judges and referees following the controversy, stating that they "determined that less than a handful of the decisions were not at the level expected" and "that the concerned referees and judges will no longer officiate at the Rio 2016 Olympic Games"; however, the original decision would still remain. Results were manipulated using a new judging system employed at Rio. Traditionally, judges would use a computer scoring system to count each punch landed but in 2016 the winner of each round was awarded 10 points and the loser a lower number, based on criteria which includes the quality of punches landed, effective aggression and tactical superiority. The new computer system took the scores of the five judges who judged the bout and supposedly a computer would randomly select three scores from those counted.

In 2019 the IOC stripped the AIBA of the right to organise the tournament at the 2020 Olympics, due to "issues in the areas of finance, governance, ethics and refereeing and judging".
