= Boxing at the 2015 European Games – Men's 91 kg =

Boxing competitions

Men's heavyweight boxing at the 2015 European Games
- Venue: Baku Crystal Hall
- Date: 16–27 June
- Competitors: 23 from 23 nations

Medalists
gold medal	Abdulkadir Abdullayev	Azerbaijan
silver medal	Gevorg Manukian	Ukraine
bronze medal	Sadam Magomedov	Russia
bronze medal	Josip Filipi	Croatia

The men's heavyweight boxing 91 kg boxing event at the 2015 European Games in Baku was held from 16 to 27 June at the Baku Crystal Hall.

== Results ==
=== Final ===
Final; 27 June
Abdulkadir Abdullayev (AZE)	WO
Gevorg Manukian (UKR)

=== Top half ===
Round of 32; 16 June
Ádám Hámori (HUN)	3
Erik Tlkanec (SVK)	0
Albon Pervizaj (GER)	3
Victor Ialimov (MDA)	0
Sadam Magomedov (RUS)	3
Tadas Tamašauskas (LTU)	0

Round of 16; 21 June
Abdulkadir Abdullayev (AZE)	3
Ádám Hámori (HUN)	0
Alem Čolpa (BIH)	0
Paul Omba-Biongolo (FRA)	3
Jim Andreasen (DEN)	0
Albon Pervizaj (GER)	3
Sadam Magomedov (RUS)	3
Levan Guledani (GEO)	0

Quarterfinals; 23 June
Abdulkadir Abdullayev (AZE)	3
Paul Omba-Biongolo (FRA)	0
Albon Pervizaj (GER)	0
Sadam Magomedov (RUS)	3

Semifinals; 26 June
Abdulkadir Abdullayev (AZE)	3
Sadam Magomedov (RUS)	0

=== Bottom half ===
Round of 32; 16 June
Ionuţ Jitaru (ROU)	0
Darren O'Neill (IRL)	3
Gevorg Manukian (UKR)	3
David Hošek (CZE)	0
Rain Karlson (EST)	1
Bahram Muzaffer (TUR)	2
Gabriel Richards (SWE)	3
Stefan Nikolic (AUT)	0

Round of 16; 21 June
Raitis Sinkēvičs (LAT)	0
Darren O'Neill (IRL)	3
Gevorg Manukian (UKR)	3
Kristiyan Dimitrov (BUL)	0
Leanid Charnabayeu (BLR)	0
Bahram Muzaffer (TUR)	3
Gabriel Richards (SWE)	1
Josip Filipi (CRO)	2

Quarterfinals; 24 June
Darren O'Neill (IRL)	1
Gevorg Manukian (UKR)	2
Bahram Muzaffer (TUR)	0
Josip Filipi (CRO)	3

Semifinals; 26 June
Gevorg Manukian (UKR)	TKO-I
Josip Filipi (CRO)
