= Calum French =

British amateur boxer

Personal information
- Nationality: British
- Born: 25 August 1995 (age 31) Gateshead, United Kingdom
- Height: 1.75 m (5 ft 9 in)
- Weight: 60 kg (130 lb; 9.4 st)

Boxing career
Medal record
Men's amateur boxing
Representing England
European Championships
Bronze medal – third place	2017 Kharkiv	Lightweight
EU Championships
Silver medal – second place	2018 Valladolid	Lightweight

Calum Jordan French (born 25 August 1995) is a British amateur boxer. He is currently an active member of the GB Boxing podium squad, having represented Great Britain in four WSB fights. Having recently been selected to represent England in the 2018 Commonwealth Games in Australia's Gold Coast, French has stated his ambition is to become an Olympic champion in 2020. His most recent fights have been in the lightweight (60 kg) category.

== GB Boxing ==
In 2017, French received his first major championship medal, a bronze, at the 2017 European Amateur Boxing Championships. Along with nine other teammates, he qualified for the 2017 AIBA World Boxing Championships. French's defeat to Iurii Shestak in the semi-final brought to end a 5 year 35 fight unbeaten streak.

French was selected to represent England in the 2018 Commonwealth Games taking place in April in Australia's Gold Coast.

== Competition record (WSB) ==
March 23, 2017
Won by unanimous decision (3:0) against Michael Magnesi of Italy
April 21, 2017
Won by unanimous decision (3:0) against Abdellah Boudrar of Morocco
May 20, 2017
Won by unanimous decision (3:0) against Khalil el Hadri of France
February 16, 2018
Won by unanimous decision (3:0) against Matteo Komadina of Croatia

== Competition record (championships) ==
- 2011: England Junior ABA National Championships - Gold
- 2011: Junior Three nations - Gold
- 2012: England Junior and Youth ABA National Championships - Gold
- 2012: Junior and Youth Three nations - Gold
- 2013: England Junior and Youth ABA National Championships - Gold
- 2013: National Association Boys Clubs - Gold
- 2015: England Boxing Senior Elite National Championships – Gold
- 2015: Senior Elite Three Nations Championships – Gold
- 2016: Chemistry Cup, Germany - Gold
- 2016: England Boxing Senior Elite National Championships – Gold
- 2016: Tammer Tournament, Finland - Gold
- 2017: Strandja memorial, Bulgaria - Gold
- 2017: European Championships, Ukraine - Bronze
- 2017: GB Boxing Championships, Sheffield - Gold
- 2018: European Union championships, Spain - Silver
- 2019: Golden Glove, Serbia - Bronze
- 2021: Socikas Tournament, Lithuania - Gold
