= Korving =

Korving is a surname. Notable people with the surname include:

- Robin Korving (born 1974), Dutch hurdler
- Roy Korving (born 1995), Dutch boxer
