= David Graf (disambiguation) =

David Graf may refer to:

- David Graf (1950–2001), an American actor
- David Graf (boxer) (born January 1989), a German boxer
- David Graf (BMX rider) (born September 1989), a Swiss BMX rider
