= Sanjar Tursunov (boxer) =

Uzbekistani boxer (born 1998)

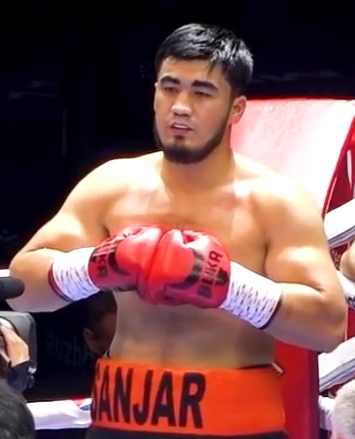
- Tursunov in 2021

Personal information
- Nationality: Uzbekistani
- Born: 18 August 1998 (age 27) Denov, Uzbekistan

Sport
- Sport: Boxing
Medal record
Men's amateur boxing
Representing Uzbekistan
World Championships
Bronze medal – third place	2017 Hamburg	Heavyweight
Asian Championships
Silver medal – second place	2019 Bangkok	Heavyweight
Bronze medal – third place	2021 Dubai	Heavyweight

Sanjar Tursunov (born 18 August 1998) is an Uzbekistani boxer. He competed in the men's heavyweight event at the 2020 Summer Olympics.
