= Vasilii Egorov =

Russian boxer (born 1993)

Vasily Egorov
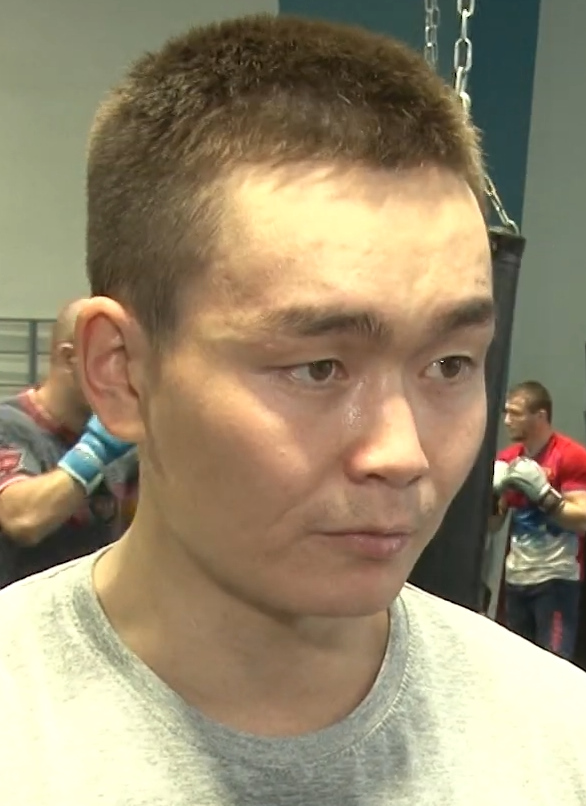
- Egorov in January 2019

Personal information
- Native name: Василий Михайлович Егоров
- Full name: Vasily Mikhailovich Egorov
- Nationality: Yakutsn
- Born: September 16, 1992 (age 33) Megino-Kangalassky District, Yakutia, Russia
- Height: 1.62 m (5 ft 4 in)

Sport
- Sport: Boxing
- Weight class: Light flyweight
Medal record
Men's amateur boxing
Representing Russia
World Championships
Silver medal – second place	2015 Doha	Light flyweight
European Championships
Gold medal – first place	2015 Samokov	Light flyweight
Gold medal – first place	2017 Kharkiv	Light flyweight

Vasily Mikhailovich Egorov (Russian: Василий Михайлович Егоров; born 16 September 1993 in Megino-Kangalassky District, Yakutia, Russia) is a Russian boxer of Yakut descent in Light flyweight category. He won silver at the 2015 World Championships and gold at the 2015 European Championships.

== Biography ==
Egorov was born in the village of Hara in Megino-Kangalassky District, Yakutia on September 16, 1993. In 2016 he graduated with honors from the Churapchinsky Institute of Physical Education and Sports.

Father is Mikhail Nikolayevich Egorov, mother is Lyudmila Innokentyevna. Older brothers Mikhail and Nikolai, older sister Alyona.

In November 2019 he married Angelica.

== Career ==
He started boxing after his elder brother, Nikolai took up boxing.

At the 2013 Russian Championships. Egorov began competing in the category up to 49 kg. He reached the finals but lost to Balik Galanov. Thus, Egorov won a silver medal in the senior level at the Russian Nationals.

At the 2014 Russian Championships up to 49 kg. In the 1/8 finals he defeated Gore Hakobyan. In the quarterfinals, he defeated Ivan Varlamov. In the semifinals, he defeated 2012 Olympic bronze medalist David Ayrapetyan and in the final, he defeated Alexander Samoilov, becoming the Russian National champion.

In 2015, he won gold at the 2015 European Championships and in October, Egorov competed in his first Worlds at the 2015 AIBA World Boxing Championships in Doha, Qatar but lost in the finals to Cuban, Joahnys Argilagos.

In 2016 he participated in the Olympic Games in Rio de Janeiro.

In 2024 he announced his retirement.

== IBA professional boxing record ==
1 fight	1 win	0 losses
By decision	1	0

No.	Result	Record	Opponent	Type	Round, time	Date	Location	Notes
1	Win	1–0	Jesse Espinas	UD	6	12 Jul 2024	IBA Coliseum, Serpukhov, Russia	
