= Iurii Shestak =

Ukrainian boxer

Personal information
- Nationality: Ukrainian
- Born: Шестак Юрій Сергійович; 26 April 1993 (age 33)
- Weight: Lightweight

Boxing career
Medal record
Men's amateur boxing
Representing Ukraine
European Championships
Gold medal – first place	2017 Kharkiv	Lightweight
Bronze medal – third place	2022 Yerevan	Lightweight

Iurii Shestak (Шестак Юрій Сергійович; born April 26, 1993) is a Ukrainian amateur boxer in the lightweight division.

He is the 2017 European champion after winning the title in Kharkiv.

He is a two-time Ukrainian champion: 2013, 2016.
