= 2017 European Amateur Boxing Championships =

Boxing competitions

- Host city: Kharkiv
- Country: Ukraine
- Nations: 39
- Athletes: 232
- Events: 10
- Dates: June 16–24, 2017
- Main venue: Palace of Sports "Lokomotiv"

The Men's 2017 European Amateur Boxing Championships were held in the Palace of Sports "Lokomotiv", Kharkiv, Ukraine from 16 to 24 June 2017. It is the 42nd edition of this biennial competition organised by the European governing body for amateur boxing, the EUBC.

== Schedule ==
Date	Round
16-20 June 2017	Preliminaries
21 June 2017	Quarterfinals
23 June 2017	Semifinals
24 June 2017	Finals

== Participating nations ==
- Albania (3)
- Armenia (7)
- Austria (5)
- Azerbaijan (10)
- Belgium (1)
- Belarus (10)
- Bosnia and Herzegovina (2)
- Bulgaria (9)
- Croatia (5)
- Cyprus (1)
- Czech Republic (3)
- Denmark (4)
- England (10)
- Estonia (3)
- Finland (3)
- France (6)
- Georgia (8)
- Germany (10)
- Greece (2)
- Hungary (8)
- Ireland (9)
- Israel (4)
- Italy (10)
- Latvia (2)
- Lithuania (7)
- Moldova (7)
- Netherlands (4)
- Norway (2)
- Poland (10)
- Romania (8)
- Russia (10)
- Scotland (9)
- Serbia (3)
- Slovakia (5)
- Slovenia (4)
- Spain (5)
- Sweden (4)
- Turkey (9)
- Ukraine (10)

== Medal winners ==
The medal winners are:

Event	Gold	Silver	Bronze
Light Flyweight (–49 kg)	Vasilii Egorov; Russia	Galal Yafai; England	Yauheni Karmilchyk; Belarus
Light Flyweight (–49 kg)	Vasilii Egorov; Russia	Galal Yafai; England	Samuel Carmona; Spain
Flyweight (–52 kg)	Daniel Asenov; Bulgaria	Niall Farrell; England	Dmytro Zamotayev; Ukraine
Flyweight (–52 kg)	Daniel Asenov; Bulgaria	Niall Farrell; England	Brendan Irvine; Ireland
Bantamweight (–56 kg)	Peter McGrail; England	Mykola Butsenko; Ukraine	José Quiles; Spain
Bantamweight (–56 kg)	Peter McGrail; England	Mykola Butsenko; Ukraine	Kurt Walker; Ireland
Lightweight (–60 kg)	Iurii Shestak; Ukraine	Gabil Mamedov; Russia	Calum French; England
Lightweight (–60 kg)	Iurii Shestak; Ukraine	Gabil Mamedov; Russia	Pavlo Ishchenko; Israel
Light Welterweight (–64 kg)	Hovhannes Bachkov; Armenia	Luke McCormack; England	Mateusz Polski; Poland
Light Welterweight (–64 kg)	Hovhannes Bachkov; Armenia	Luke McCormack; England	Evaldas Petrauskas; Lithuania
Welterweight (–69 kg)	Abass Baraou; Germany	Pat McCormack; England	Vasile Belous; Moldova
Welterweight (–69 kg)	Abass Baraou; Germany	Pat McCormack; England	Ievgenii Barabanov; Ukraine
Middleweight (–75 kg)	Oleksandr Khyzhniak; Ukraine	Kamran Shakhsuvarly; Azerbaijan	Salvatore Cavallaro; Italy
Middleweight (–75 kg)	Oleksandr Khyzhniak; Ukraine	Kamran Shakhsuvarly; Azerbaijan	Zoltán Harcsa; Hungary
Light Heavyweight (–81 kg)	Joe Ward; Ireland	Muslim Gadzhimagomedov; Russia	Valentino Manfredonia; Italy
Light Heavyweight (–81 kg)	Joe Ward; Ireland	Muslim Gadzhimagomedov; Russia	Damir Plantić; Croatia
Heavyweight (–91 kg)	Evgeny Tishchenko; Russia	Cheavan Clarke; England	Paul Omba-Biongolo; France
Heavyweight (–91 kg)	Evgeny Tishchenko; Russia	Cheavan Clarke; England	Roy Korving; Netherlands
Super Heavyweight (+91 kg)	Victor Vykhryst; Ukraine	Frazer Clarke; England	Maxim Babanin; Russia
Super Heavyweight (+91 kg)	Victor Vykhryst; Ukraine	Frazer Clarke; England	Djamili-Dini Aboudou-Moindze; France

=== Medal table ===
* Host nation (Ukraine)

Rank	Nation	Gold	Silver	Bronze	Total
1	Ukraine (UKR)*	3	1	2	6
2	Russia (RUS)	2	2	1	5
3	England (ENG)	1	6	1	8
4	Ireland (IRL)	1	0	2	3
5	Armenia (ARM)	1	0	0	1
5	Bulgaria (BUL)	1	0	0	1
5	Germany (GER)	1	0	0	1
8	Azerbaijan (AZE)	0	1	0	1
9	France (FRA)	0	0	2	2
9	Italy (ITA)	0	0	2	2
9	Spain (ESP)	0	0	2	2
12	Belarus (BLR)	0	0	1	1
12	Croatia (CRO)	0	0	1	1
12	Hungary (HUN)	0	0	1	1
12	Israel (ISR)	0	0	1	1
12	Lithuania (LTU)	0	0	1	1
12	Moldova (MDA)	0	0	1	1
12	Netherlands (NED)	0	0	1	1
12	Poland (POL)	0	0	1	1
Totals (19 entries)		10	10	20	40
