= Boxing at the 2016 Summer Olympics – Men's heavyweight =

Boxing competitions

Men's heavyweight boxing at the Games of the XXXI Olympiad
- Venue: Riocentro – Pavilion 6
- Date: 6–15 August 2016
- Competitors: 18 from 18 nations

Medalists
1st place, gold medalist(s)		Evgeny Tishchenko	Russia
2nd place, silver medalist(s)		Vasily Levit	Kazakhstan
3rd place, bronze medalist(s)		Rustam Tulaganov	Uzbekistan
3rd place, bronze medalist(s)		Erislandy Savón	Cuba

The men's heavyweight boxing competition at the 2016 Olympic Games in Rio de Janeiro was held from 6 to 15 August at the Riocentro.

The final and medal ceremony saw angry crowd reactions after Russia's Evgeny Tishchenko controversially beat Vasily Levit of Kazakhstan on a unanimous judge's decision. The competition had seen the return of judges scoring fighters on their overall performance in each round rather than a punch counting system originally introduced after controversy over judging in the Seoul Olympics.

== Schedule ==
All times are Brasília Time (UTC−3).

Date	Time	Round
Saturday 6 August 2016	12:59	Round of 32
Monday 8 August 2016	13:16	Round of 16
Wednesday 10 August 2016	13:35	Quarter-finals
Saturday 13 August 2016	18:56	Semi-finals
Monday 15 August 2016	19:30	Final

== Results ==
=== Finals ===
Semi-finals
Evgeny Tishchenko (RUS)	3
Rustam Tulaganov (UZB)	0
Vasily Levit (KAZ)	3
Erislandy Savón (CUB)	0

Final
Evgeny Tishchenko (RUS)	3
Vasily Levit (KAZ)	0

=== Top half ===
Round of 32
Juan Nogueira (BRA)	3
Jason Whateley (AUS)	0

Round of 16
Evgeny Tishchenko (RUS)	3
Juan Nogueira (BRA)	0
Hassen Chaktami (TUN)	0
Clemente Russo (ITA)	3
Rustam Tulaganov (UZB)	3
Julio Castillo (ECU)	0
Paul Omba-Biongolo (FRA)
Abdulkadir Abdullayev (AZE)	TKO

Quarter-finals
Evgeny Tishchenko (RUS)	3
Clemente Russo (ITA)	0
Rustam Tulaganov (UZB)	3
Abdulkadir Abdullayev (AZE)	0

Semi-finals
Evgeny Tishchenko (RUS)	3
Rustam Tulaganov (UZB)	0

=== Bottom half ===
Round of 32
Lawrence Okolie (GBR)	3
Igor Jakubowski (POL)	0

Round of 16
Vasily Levit (KAZ)	TKO
Yu Fengkai (CHN)
Chouaib Bouloudinat (ALG)	1
Kennedy St-Pierre (MRI)	2
Yamil Peralta (ARG)	2
David Graf (GER)	1
Lawrence Okolie (GBR)	0
Erislandy Savón (CUB)	3

Quarter-finals
Vasily Levit (KAZ)	3
Kennedy St-Pierre (MRI)	0
Yamil Peralta (ARG)	0
Erislandy Savón (CUB)	3

Semi-finals
Vasily Levit (KAZ)	3
Erislandy Savón (CUB)	0
