= David Graf (boxer) =

German boxer (born 1989)

Personal information
- Nationality: German
- Born: Vahagn Sahakyan; 12 January 1989 (age 37) Yerevan, Armenian SSR, USSR
- Height: 191 cm (6 ft 3 in)
- Weight: 91 kg (201 lb)

Boxing career

David Graf (born 12 January 1989) is a German boxer. He competed in the men's heavyweight event at the 2016 Summer Olympics where he lost in the round of 16 to Yamil Peralta. He was formerly known as Vahagn Sahakyan.
