= Rustam Tulaganov =

Uzbek boxer (born 1991)

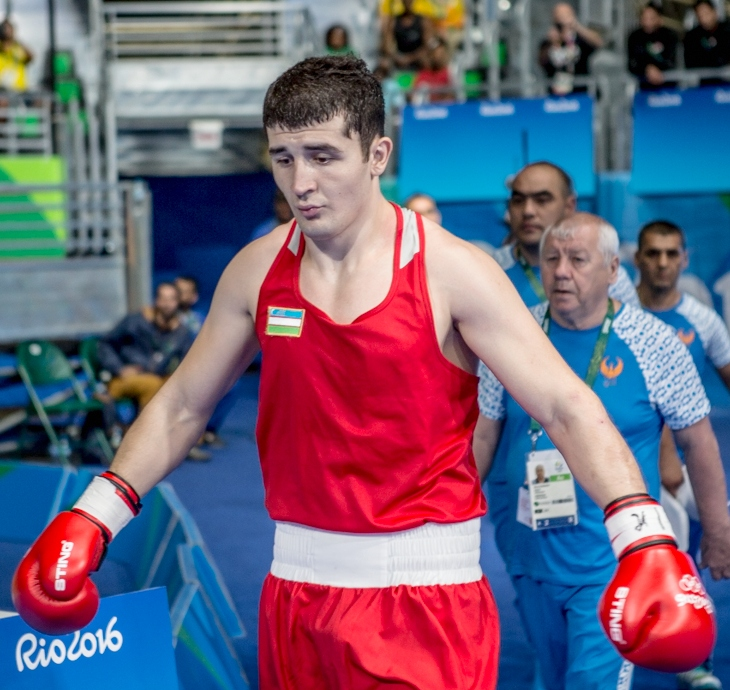

Personal information
- Nationality: Uzbek
- Born: Rustam Tulkin Ugli Tulaganov; 8 October 1991 (age 34) Tashkent, Uzbekistan
- Height: 1.85 m (6 ft 1 in)
- Weight: Light heavyweight

Boxing career
- Stance: Orthodox

Boxing record
- Total fights: 4
- Wins: 4
- Win by KO: 1
- Losses: 0
Medal record
Men's amateur boxing
Representing Uzbekistan
Olympic Games
Bronze medal – third place	2016 Rio Janeiro	Heavyweight
Asian Championships
Silver medal – second place	2015 Bangkok	Heavyweight

Rustam Tulkin Ugli Tulaganov (born 8 October 1991) is an Uzbek professional boxer. As an amateur he won a bronze medal at the 2016 Summer Olympics.

== Amateur career ==
=== Olympic result ===
Rio 2016

- Round of 16: Defeated Julio Castillo (Ecuador) 3–0
- Quarter-finals: Defeated Abdulkadir Abdullayev (Azerbaijan) 3–0
- Semi-finals: Defeated by Evgeny Tishchenko (Russia) 3–0

== Professional career ==
On 27 October 2017, Tulaganov made his professional debut against Robert Guerra. Tulaganov was taken the full distance as he won via unanimous decision after winning every round on each of the three scorecards. Tulaganov fought for a second time as a professional on 21 December 2019 against Konstantin Piternov. After dominating the entirety of the bout, Tulaganov won via technical knockout in the fourth round after his Russian opponent eventually succumbed to a shoulder injury.

On 1 February 2020, Tulaganov fought against Norbert Dąbrowski. Tulaganov was once again taken the full distance as he secured another comfortable victory via unanimous decision over eight rounds.

== Professional boxing record ==
5 fights	5 wins	0 losses
By knockout	1	0
By decision	4	0

No.	Result	Record	Opponent	Type	Round, time	Date	Location	Notes
4	Win	4–0	(Colombia) Beibi Berrocal	UD	8	29 Jan 2021	Soviet Wings Sport Palace, Moscow, Russia	
3	Win	3–0	(Poland) Norbert Dąbrowski	UD	8	1 Feb 2020	Yantarny Sports Palace, Kaliningrad, Russia	
2	Win	2–0	(Russia) Konstantin Piternov	TKO	4 (8), 1:55	21 Dec 2019	Ivan Yarygin Sports Palace, Krasnoyarsk, Russia	
1	Win	1–0	(United States) Robert Guerra	UD	4	27 Oct 2017	(United States) The Belvedere, Elk Grove Village, Illinois, US	
