= Yu Fengkai =

Chinese boxer

Personal information
- Born: 13 March 1995 (age 31) Linzi District, Zibo, Shandong, China

Boxing career

Yu Fengkai (born 13 March 1995) is a Chinese boxer. He competed in the men's heavyweight event at the 2016 Summer Olympics.
