= Jason Whateley =

Australian boxer

Jason Whateley OLY
Personal information
- Nationality: Australian
- Born: Jason Eric Whateley; 18 November 1990 (age 35) Sale, Victoria, Australia

Boxing career
Medal record
Men's amateur boxing
Representing Australia
Commonwealth Games
Silver medal – second place	2018 Gold Coast	Heavyweight
Arafura Games
Gold medal – first place	2011 Darwin	Heavyweight

Jason Eric Whateley (born 18 November 1990) is an Australian professional boxer. As an amateur, he competed in the men's heavyweight event at the 2016 Summer Olympics.

== Professional boxing record ==
11 fights	10 wins	1 loss
By knockout	9	0
By decision	1	1

No.	Result	Record	Opponent	Type	Round, time	Date	Location	Notes
11	Loss	10–1	Mateusz Masternak	UD	10	29 October 2022	Nosalowy Dwór, Zakopane, Poland	
10	Win	10–0	Savenaca Naliva	KO	2 (10), 0:32	13 April 2022	Fortitude Music Hall, Brisbane, Australia	
9	Win	9–0	Victor Oganov	TKO	4 (6), 2:03	16 Jun 2021	ICC Exhibition Centre, Sydney, Australia	Won vacant IBF Pan Pacific cruiserweight title
8	Win	8–0	Aaron Russell	TKO	8 (10), 0:58	17 Apr 2021	Geelong Arena, Geelong, Australia	Won IBF Australasian cruiserweight title
7	Win	7–0	Daniel Russell	TKO	1 (10), 1:11	14 Dec 2019	The Timber Yard, Melbourne, Australia	Won Australian cruiserweight title
6	Win	6–0	Alejandro Emilio Valori	KO	2 (8), 2:20	12 Oct 2019	Aquatic & Recreation Centre, Bairnsdale, Australia	
5	Win	5–0	Victor Oganov	TKO	6 (8), 0:45	1 Jun 2019	The Timber Yard, Melbourne, Australia	Won Victoria State cruiserweight title
4	Win	4–0	Filimoni Naliva Jr	KO	1 (8), 0:51	27 Apr 2019	Whitehorse Club, Melbourne, Australia	Won vacant WBF Australasian cruiserweight title
3	Win	3–0	Jonasa Kavika	KO	2 (8), 2:09	23 Mar 2019	The Timber Yard, Melbourne, Australia	
2	Win	2–0	Harjinder Singh	TKO	3 (6), 1:49	14 Dec 2018	The Melbourne Pavilion, Melbourne, Australia	
1	Win	1–0	Navosa Ioata	UD	6	7 Sep 2018	The Melbourne Pavilion, Melbourne, Australia	
