= Erislandy Savón =

Cuban boxer (born 1990)

Personal information
- Full name: Erislandy Savón Cotilla
- Born: July 21, 1990 (age 36) Guantánamo, Cuba

Sport
- Sport: Boxing
- Weight class: Heavyweight
Medal record
Men's amateur boxing
Representing Cuba
Olympic Games
Bronze medal – third place	2016 Rio de Janeiro	Heavyweight
World Amateur Championships
Gold medal – first place	2017 Hamburg	Heavyweight
Silver medal – second place	2015 Doha	Heavyweight
Pan American Games
Gold medal – first place	2015 Toronto	Heavyweight
Gold medal – first place	2019 Lima	Heavyweight
Pan American Championship
Gold medal – first place	2017 Tegucigalpa	Heavyweight
Central American and Caribbean Games
Gold medal – first place	2014 Veracruz	Heavyweight
Gold medal – first place	2018 Barranquilla	Heavyweight
Youth World Championships
Gold medal – first place	2008 Guadalajara	Heavyweight

Erislandy Savón Cotilla (born July 21, 1990) is a Cuban heavyweight amateur boxer. He won the 91 kg/201 lbs title at the 2008 Youth World Amateur Boxing Championships, the 2009 Pan American Championships at Super Heavyweight and also the AIBA World Boxing Championships 2015 and 2017 in Heavyweight.

== Career ==
Savón who hails from Guantánamo is a nephew of Félix Savón and also a big puncher. He won the Youth World Championships 2008. At the National Championships he lost the 91 kg/201 lbs semifinal 2008 to Osmay Acosta 3:6 and was disqualified in 2009.

Savon won his first senior title at the 2009 PanAmerican Championships against Juan Hiracheta He was sent to the 2009 World Amateur Boxing Championships at Super Heavyweight instead of national champion Robert Alfonso, beat two unknowns but lost to the eventual runner-up Roman Kapitonenko in his third bout.

At the 2011 World Amateur Boxing Championships he ran into an even bigger puncher and was stopped by the future champion Magomedrasul Majidov, but qualified for the Olympics. He did not participate in the 2011 Pan American Games. At the 2012 Summer Olympics, he lost his opening match to Anthony Joshua.

He won the bronze medal at the men's heavyweight event at the 2016 Summer Olympics. He beat Lawrence Okolie and Yamil Peralta before losing to Vasily Levit.
