= 2017 AIBA World Boxing Championships =

Boxing competitions

2017 World Amateur Boxing Championships
- Venue: Alsterdorfer Sporthalle
- Location: Hamburg, Germany
- Start date: 25 August 2017
- End date: 2 September 2017
- Competitors: 279 from 85 nations

The 2017 AIBA World Boxing Championships was held at the Alsterdorfer Sporthalle in Hamburg, Germany from 25 August to 2 September 2017.

== Medal summary ==
=== Medal table ===
Rank	Nation	Gold	Silver	Bronze	Total
1	Cuba (CUB)	5	2	0	7
2	Uzbekistan (UZB)	1	3	2	6
3	Kazakhstan (KAZ)	1	2	3	6
4	Azerbaijan (AZE)	1	0	1	2
5	France (FRA)	1	0	0	1
5	Ukraine (UKR)	1	0	0	1
7	United States (USA)	0	1	2	3
8	Russia (RUS)	0	1	1	2
9	Ireland (IRL)	0	1	0	1
10	Armenia (ARM)	0	0	1	1
10	Australia (AUS)	0	0	1	1
10	Cameroon (CMR)	0	0	1	1
10	Colombia (COL)	0	0	1	1
10	Ecuador (ECU)	0	0	1	1
10	England (ENG)	0	0	1	1
10	Georgia (GEO)	0	0	1	1
10	Germany (GER)	0	0	1	1
10	India (IND)	0	0	1	1
10	Mongolia (MGL)	0	0	1	1
10	South Korea (KOR)	0	0	1	1
Totals (20 entries)		10	10	20	40

=== Medal events ===
Event	Gold	Silver	Bronze
Light flyweight	(Cuba) Joahnys Argilagos	(Uzbekistan) Hasanboy Dusmatov	(Kazakhstan) Zhomart Yerzhan
Light flyweight	(Cuba) Joahnys Argilagos	(Uzbekistan) Hasanboy Dusmatov	(Colombia) Yuberjen Martínez
Flyweight	(Cuba) Yosvany Veitía	(Uzbekistan) Jasurbek Latipov	(Russia) Tamir Galanov
Flyweight	(Cuba) Yosvany Veitía	(Uzbekistan) Jasurbek Latipov	(South Korea) Kim In-kyu
Bantamweight	(Kazakhstan) Kairat Yeraliyev	(United States) Duke Ragan	(England) Peter McGrail
Bantamweight	(Kazakhstan) Kairat Yeraliyev	(United States) Duke Ragan	(India) Gaurav Bidhuri
Lightweight	(France) Sofiane Oumiha	(Cuba) Lázaro Álvarez	(Georgia (country)) Otar Eranosyan
Lightweight	(France) Sofiane Oumiha	(Cuba) Lázaro Álvarez	(Mongolia) Dorjnyambuugiin Otgondalai
Light welterweight	(Cuba) Andy Cruz Gómez	(Uzbekistan) Ikboljon Kholdarov	(United States) Freudis Rojas
Light welterweight	(Cuba) Andy Cruz Gómez	(Uzbekistan) Ikboljon Kholdarov	(Armenia) Hovhannes Bachkov
Welterweight	(Uzbekistan) Shakhram Giyasov	(Cuba) Roniel Iglesias	(Kazakhstan) Ablaikhan Zhussupov
Welterweight	(Uzbekistan) Shakhram Giyasov	(Cuba) Roniel Iglesias	(Germany) Abass Baraou
Middleweight	(Ukraine) Oleksandr Khyzhniak	(Kazakhstan) Abilkhan Amankul	(Azerbaijan) Kamran Shakhsuvarly
Middleweight	(Ukraine) Oleksandr Khyzhniak	(Kazakhstan) Abilkhan Amankul	(United States) Troy Isley
Light heavyweight	(Cuba) Julio César La Cruz	(Republic of Ireland) Joe Ward	(Ecuador) Carlos Andrés Mina
Light heavyweight	(Cuba) Julio César La Cruz	(Republic of Ireland) Joe Ward	(Uzbekistan) Bektemir Melikuziev
Heavyweight	(Cuba) Erislandy Savón	(Russia) Evgeny Tishchenko	(Uzbekistan) Sanjar Tursunov
Heavyweight	(Cuba) Erislandy Savón	(Russia) Evgeny Tishchenko	(Kazakhstan) Vasily Levit
Super heavyweight	(Azerbaijan) Magomedrasul Majidov	(Kazakhstan) Kamshybek Kunkabayev	(Cameroon) Arsène Fokou Fosso
Super heavyweight	(Azerbaijan) Magomedrasul Majidov	(Kazakhstan) Kamshybek Kunkabayev	(Australia) Joseph Goodall
