= Paul Omba-Biongolo =

French boxer (born 1995)

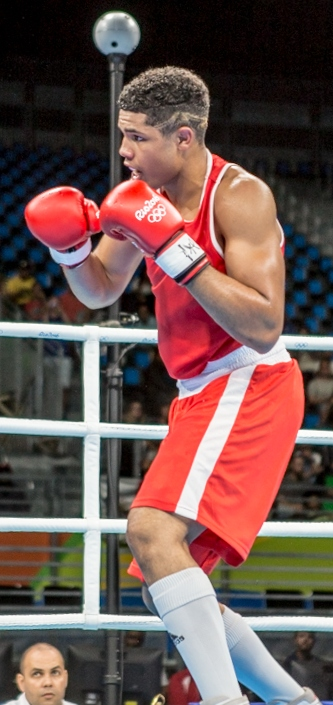
- Omba-Biongolo at the 2016 Olympics

Personal information
- Born: 28 December 1995 (age 30) Vienne, France
- Education: INSEP
- Height: 189 cm (6 ft 2 in)

Sport
- Sport: Boxing
- Club: Boxing Lyon
- Coached by: Kamel Hasni
Medal record
Men's amateur boxing
Representing France
European Championships
Bronze medal – third place	2017 Kharkiv	Heavyweight
Mediterranean Games
Bronze medal – third place	2018 Tarragona	Heavyweight

Paul Omba-Biongolo (born 28 December 1995) is a French heavyweight boxer. He competed at the 2016 Olympics, but was eliminated in his first bout by Abdulkadir Abdullayev of Azerbaijan.
