= Vassiliy Levit =

Kazakhstani boxer (born 1988)

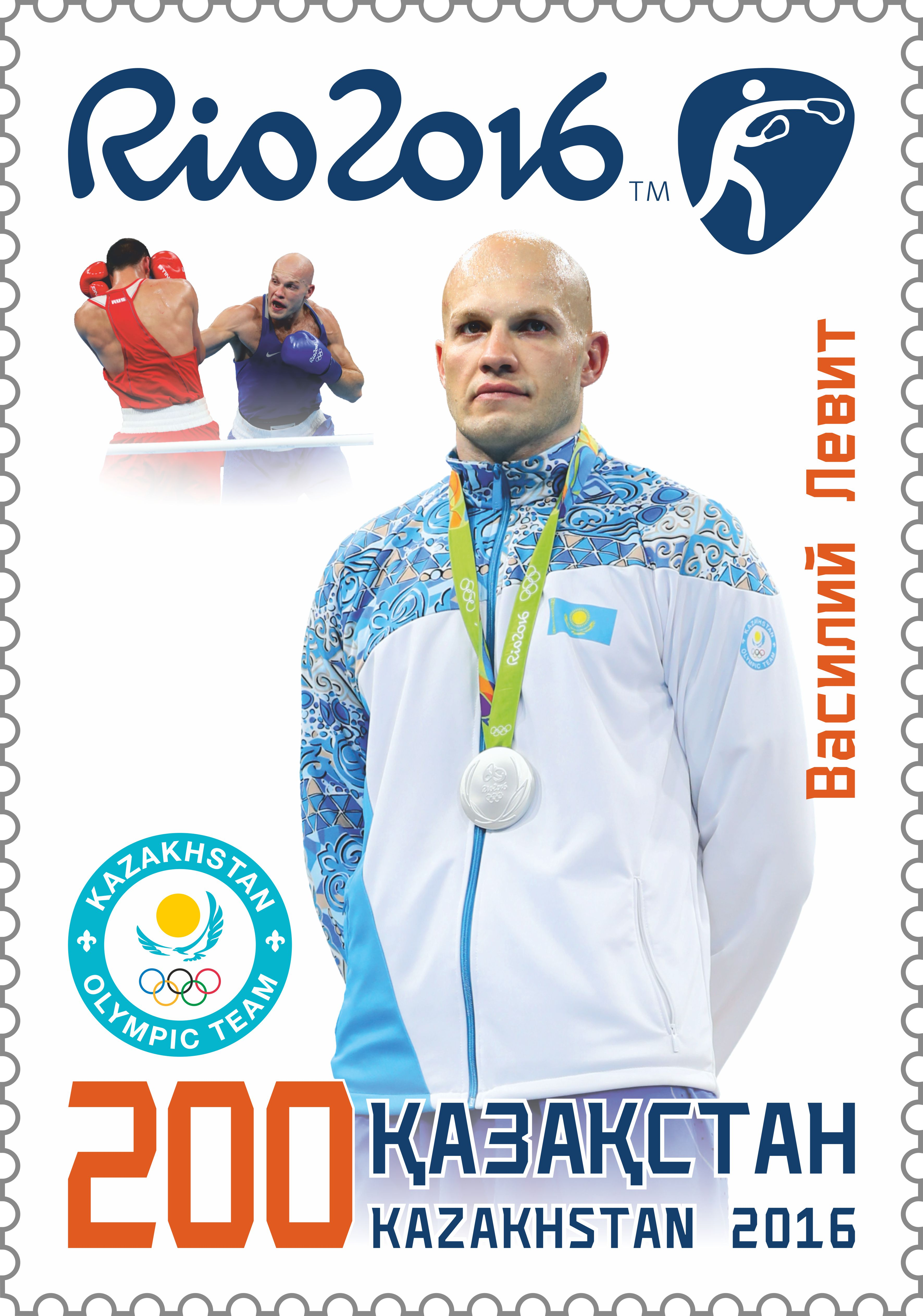
- Levit on a 2016 stamp of Kazakhstan

Personal information
- Nationality: Kazakhstani
- Born: 24 February 1988 (age 38) Fyodorvka, Fyodorov District, Kostanay Region, Kazakh SSR, Soviet Union
- Height: 1.87 m (6 ft 2 in)

Boxing career

Boxing record
- Total fights: 96
- Wins: 78
- Win by KO: 10
- Losses: 18
- Draws: 0
- No contests: 0
Medal record
Men's amateur boxing
Representing Kazakhstan
Olympic Games
Silver medal – second place	2016 Rio de Janeiro	Heavyweight
World Championships
Bronze medal – third place	2017 Hamburg	Heavyweight
Bronze medal – third place	2019 Yekaterinburg	Heavyweight
Asian Championships
Gold medal – first place	2009 Zhuhai	Heavyweight
Gold medal – first place	2015 Bangkok	Heavyweight
Gold medal – first place	2017 Tashkent	Heavyweight
Silver medal – second place	2021 Dubai	Heavyweight
Bronze medal – third place	2019 Bangkok	Heavyweight

Vassiliy Levit (Russian: Васи́лий Леви́т; born 24 February 1988) is a Kazakh heavyweight amateur boxer who won a silver medal at the 2016 Summer Olympics.

== Career ==
In the 2016 Olympic final Levit was controversially defeated by Russia's Evgeny Tishchenko via a unanimous judge's decision. The crowd reacted with shock and anger to the result, and several boxing professionals criticised the decision, with some suggesting Levit should have been awarded all three rounds. At the medal ceremony, Levit put his fingers to his lips to discourage the crowd from booing Tischenko. Afterwards, Levit said that he felt that he had won the fight, but declined to criticise the judges and said that Tischenko deserved respect.

He won the bronze medal at the 2017 AIBA World Boxing Championships in the Heavyweight category.

== Coaching career ==
September 28, 2022 — appointed Head of the Department of Physical Training of Personnel Anti-Corruption Agencies of the Republic of Kazakhstan.
