= 2015 AIBA World Boxing Championships =

Boxing competitions

- Venue: Ali Bin Hamad Al Attiya Arena
- Location: Doha, Qatar
- Start date: 5 October 2015
- End date: 18 October 2015
- Competitors: 260 from 73 nations

The 2015 AIBA World Boxing Championships were held at the Ali Bin Hamad Al Attiya Arena in Doha, Qatar, from 5 to 18 October 2015. The event served as a qualifying tournament for the 2016 Summer Olympics.

== Opening ceremony ==
World professional boxing champions Mike Tyson, Manny Pacquiao and Amir Khan were celebrity guests for the event. The event was broadcast to nearly 500 million viewers in 112 countries. A total of 260 boxers from 74 countries participated in ten weight classes and among the prizes were 23 tickets for the 2016 Summer Olympics in Rio de Janeiro.

== Results ==
=== Medal table ===
Rank	Nation	Gold	Silver	Bronze	Total
1	Cuba (CUB)	4	2	1	7
2	Russia (RUS)	2	1	1	4
3	Azerbaijan (AZE)	1	1	2	4
4	Ireland (IRL)	1	1	1	3
5	France (FRA)	1	0	0	1
5	Morocco (MAR)	1	0	0	1
7	Uzbekistan (UZB)	0	3	3	6
8	Kazakhstan (KAZ)	0	2	0	2
9	China (CHN)	0	0	2	2
9	Ukraine (UKR)	0	0	2	2
11	Algeria (ALG)	0	0	1	1
11	Belarus (BLR)	0	0	1	1
11	Brazil (BRA)	0	0	1	1
11	Egypt (EGY)	0	0	1	1
11	Great Britain (GBR)	0	0	1	1
11	India (IND)	0	0	1	1
11	Philippines (PHI)	0	0	1	1
11	Thailand (THA)	0	0	1	1
Totals (18 entries)		10	10	20	40

== Medal summary ==
Event	Gold	Silver	Bronze
Light flyweight	Joahnys Argilagos; Cuba	Vasilii Egorov; Russia	Rogen Ladon; Philippines
Light flyweight	Joahnys Argilagos; Cuba	Vasilii Egorov; Russia	Dmytro Zamotayev; Ukraine
Flyweight	Elvin Mamishzada; Azerbaijan	Yosvany Veitía; Cuba	Hu Jianguan; China
Flyweight	Elvin Mamishzada; Azerbaijan	Yosvany Veitía; Cuba	Mohamed Flissi; Algeria
Bantamweight	Michael Conlan; Ireland	Murodjon Akhmadaliev; Uzbekistan	Shiva Thapa; India
Bantamweight	Michael Conlan; Ireland	Murodjon Akhmadaliev; Uzbekistan	Dzmitry Asanau; Belarus
Lightweight	Lázaro Álvarez; Cuba	Albert Selimov; Azerbaijan	Elnur Abduraimov; Uzbekistan
Lightweight	Lázaro Álvarez; Cuba	Albert Selimov; Azerbaijan	Robson Conceição; Brazil
Light welterweight	Vitaly Dunaytsev; Russia	Fazliddin Gaibnazarov; Uzbekistan	Yasniel Toledo; Cuba
Light welterweight	Vitaly Dunaytsev; Russia	Fazliddin Gaibnazarov; Uzbekistan	Wuttichai Masuk; Thailand
Welterweight	Mohammed Rabii; Morocco	Daniyar Yeleussinov; Kazakhstan	Parviz Baghirov; Azerbaijan
Welterweight	Mohammed Rabii; Morocco	Daniyar Yeleussinov; Kazakhstan	Liu Wei; China
Middleweight	Arlen López; Cuba	Bektemir Melikuziev; Uzbekistan	Hosam Abdin; Egypt
Middleweight	Arlen López; Cuba	Bektemir Melikuziev; Uzbekistan	Michael O'Reilly; Ireland
Light heavyweight	Julio César La Cruz; Cuba	Joe Ward; Ireland	Elshod Rasulov; Uzbekistan
Light heavyweight	Julio César La Cruz; Cuba	Joe Ward; Ireland	Pavel Silyagin; Russia
Heavyweight	Evgeny Tishchenko; Russia	Erislandy Savón; Cuba	Abdulkadir Abdullayev; Azerbaijan
Heavyweight	Evgeny Tishchenko; Russia	Erislandy Savón; Cuba	Gevorg Manukian; Ukraine
Super heavyweight	Tony Yoka; France	Ivan Dychko; Kazakhstan	Bakhodir Jalolov; Uzbekistan
Super heavyweight	Tony Yoka; France	Ivan Dychko; Kazakhstan	Joseph Joyce; Great Britain

== Participating nations ==
- Algeria (7)
- Argentina (6)
- Armenia (3)
- Australia (9)
- Azerbaijan (8)
- Belarus (4)
- Bhutan (1)
- Bosnia and Herzegovina (1)
- Botswana (2)
- Brazil (4)
- Bulgaria (4)
- Canada (1)
- Cayman Islands (1)
- China (3)
- Colombia (2)
- Costa Rica (1)
- Croatia (2)
- Cuba (10)
- Czech Republic (1)
- Denmark (1)
- Dominican Republic (2)
- Ecuador (3)
- Egypt (4)
- France (4)
- Georgia (3)
- Germany (3)
- Ghana (4)
- United Kingdom (8)
- Guatemala (1)
- Hungary (2)
- India (6)
- Indonesia (1)
- Iraq (1)
- Ireland (7)
- Italy (5)
- Japan (3)
- Jordan (2)
- Kazakhstan (8)
- Kenya (1)
- Kyrgyzstan (2)
- Latvia (1)
- Lithuania (3)
- Mexico (5)
- Moldova (1)
- Mongolia (4)
- Morocco (8)
- Netherlands (4)
- New Zealand (4)
- North Korea (1)
- Pakistan (1)
- Papua New Guinea (3)
- Philippines (2)
- Poland (3)
- Puerto Rico (2)
- Qatar (6)
- Romania (1)
- Russia (7)
- Slovenia (1)
- South Korea (2)
- Spain (4)
- Syria (2)
- Tajikistan (2)
- Thailand (6)
- Trinidad and Tobago (1)
- Tunisia (1)
- Turkey (3)
- Turkmenistan (3)
- Uganda (4)
- Ukraine (9)
- United States (4)
- Uzbekistan (9)
- Vanuatu (1)
- Venezuela (8)
