= Evgeny Tishchenko =

Russian boxer

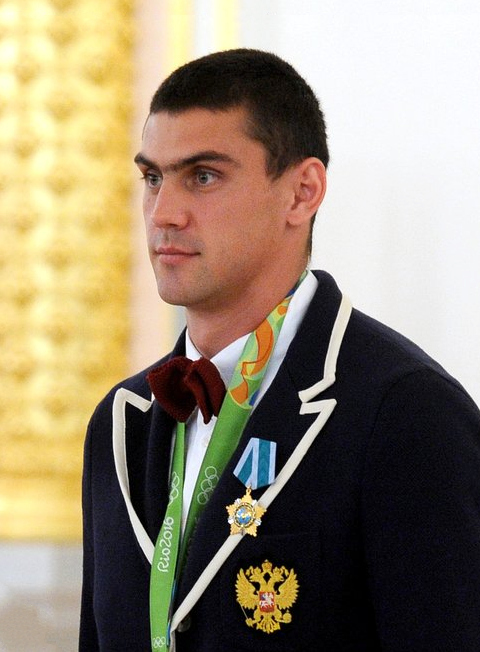
- Tishchenko in 2016

Personal information
- Nationality: Russian
- Born: 15 July 1991 (age 35) Kanevskaya, Krasnodar Krai, Russian SFSR, Soviet Union
- Height: 196 cm (6 ft 5 in)
- Weight: 91 kg (201 lb)

Boxing career
- Weight class: Cruiserweight; Bridgerweight
- Stance: Southpaw

Boxing record
- Total fights: 14
- Wins: 12
- Win by KO: 8
- Losses: 1
- No contests: 1
Medal record
Representing Russia
Olympic Games
Gold medal – first place	2016 Rio de Janeiro	Heavyweight
World Championships
Gold medal – first place	2015 Doha	Heavyweight
Silver medal – second place	2013 Almaty	Heavyweight
Silver medal – second place	2017 Hamburg	Heavyweight
European Championships
Gold medal – first place	2015 Samokov	Heavyweight
Gold medal – first place	2017 Kharkiv	Heavyweight
Summer Universiade
Gold medal – first place	2013 Kazan	-91 kg

Evgeny Andreyevich Tishchenko (Russian: Евгений Андреевич Тищенко; born 15 July 1991) is a Russian professional boxer. He was the inaugural World Boxing Association (WBA) bridgerweight champion but was subsequently stripped after testing positive for banned substance. As an amateur, he won gold medals at the 2016 Olympics, 2015 World Championships, and the 2015 and 2017 European Championships and silver at the 2013 and 2017 World Championships.

== Amateur career ==
Tishchenko was born in the village of Kanevskaya, Krasnodar Krai, but later moved to Belgorod. He is trained under the sports school of Ivan Levichev. Tishchenko became a member of the Russian national team in 2009.

He began competing among seniors in 2010 and twice won bronze medals at the Russian championships, losing the semifinals to Egor Mekhontsev in 2010 and to Nikita Ivanov in 2011. In addition, he took gold in the Youth European Championships U23 in Kaliningrad. In 2012, Tishchenko became the Russian National champion in heavyweight category. A year later, he would win the gold medal at the 2013 Summer Universiade. He won silver medal at the 2013 World Championships in Almaty, losing in the finals to twice Olympic silver medalist, Italian Clemente Russo.

In 2014, Tishchenko again won the Russian National championships, beating in finals; then European champion Aleksei Yegorov. He competed at the 2015 European Championships in Samokov, Bulgaria taking gold in heavyweight category. In October, he would repeat his success; winning the gold at the 2015 World Championships in Doha, Qatar, defeating Erislandy Savón of Cuba in the finals.

In the 2016 Olympics he again won a gold medal after defeating Kazakhstan's Vasily Levit on a controversial unanimous decision in the final. The final and medal ceremony saw angry crowd reactions.

== Professional career ==
Tischenko made his professional debut against Williams Ocando on 19 August 2018. He won the fight by a fifth-round technical knockout. Tischenko next faced Artush Sarkisyan on 13 October 2018. He won the fight by unanimous decision, with all three judges scoring the fight 60–54 in his favor. A month and a half later, on 24 November 2018, Tischenko faced Christian Mariscal. He won the fight by a second-round technical knockout, stopping Mariscal at the midway point of the round. Tischenko faced Jose Gregorio Ulrich in his fourth professional bout, which was scheduled for 22 February 2019. He won the fight by unanimous decision, with all three judges scoring the fight 80–72 for him.

Tischenko was booked to face the 16–1–1 Abraham Tabul for the vacant WBO Inter-Continental cruiserweight title on 16 June 2019. The fight was scheduled for the undercard of the Dmitry Kudryashov and Ilunga Makabu cruiserweight bout, and was broadcast by Match TV. Tischenko made quick work of his opponent, as he won the fight by a first-round knockout. Tischenko made his first WBO Inter-Continental title defense against Issa Akberbayev on 2 November 2019. Akberbayev retired from the bout at the end of the sixth round.

Tischenko faced John McCallum for the vacant WBO European cruiserweight title on 7 November 2020, on the undercard of the Magomed Kurbanov and Dmitry Mikhaylenko super welterweight bout. He won the fight by a second-round knockout, stopping McCallum with a left hook to he body. Tischenko next challenged the WBC Silver cruiserweight champion Thabiso Mchunu on 27 March 2021, in a bout which was both for the title and a WBC cruiserweight title eliminator. He lost the fight by unanimous decision, with scores of 117-111, 117–111 and 119–109.

Tischenko was scheduled to challenge the reigning WBA (Regular) cruiserweight champion Ryad Merhy on 26 March 2022, at the RCC Boxing Academy in Yekaterinburg, Russia. The WBA withdrew its sanctioning of the fight, and does not recognize Tishchenko in its current ranking.

== Personal life ==
Tishchenko has a degree in physical education from Belgorod State University. He has also studied at the Belgorod Technological University and Moscow State Mining University. He works as a police officer in Saint Petersburg. He was awarded a medal by the government after the Olympics.

== Professional boxing record ==
14 fights	12 wins	1 loss
By knockout	7	0
By decision	5	1
No contests	1	

No.	Result	Record	Opponent	Type	Round, time	Date	Location	Notes
14	NC	12–1 (1)	Leon Harth	NC	6 (12), 2:45	9 Dec 2023	Agenda Arena, Dubai, United Arab Emirates	Inaugural WBA bridgerweight title at stake; Originally KO win for Tishchenko, later ruled NC after he failed a drug test
13	Win	12–1	Yves Ngabu	SD	10	6 May 2023	KRK Uralets, Yekaterinburg, Russia	
12	Win	11–1	Artur Mann	UD	10	11 Dec 2022	DIVS, Yekaterinburg, Russia	
11	Win	10–1	Kureysh Sagov	TKO	4 (10), 2:17	9 Jul 2022	KRK Uralets, Yekaterinburg, Russia	
10	Win	9–1	Dmitry Kudryashov	UD	10	11 Sep 2021	RCC Boxing Academy, Yekaterinburg, Russia	Won vacant WBC International cruiserweight title
9	Loss	8–1	Thabiso Mchunu	UD	12	27 Mar 2021	RCC Boxing Academy, Yekaterinburg, Russia	For WBC Silver cruiserweight title
8	Win	8–0	John McCallum	KO	2 (10), 2:07	7 Nov 2020	RCC Boxing Academy, Yekaterinburg, Russia	Won vacant WBO European cruiserweight title
7	Win	7–0	Marcos Antonio Aumada	KO	3 (10), 1:41	17 Mar 2020	RCC Boxing Academy, Yekaterinburg, Russia	
6	Win	6–0	Issa Akberbayev	RTD	6 (10), 3:00	2 Nov 2019	RCC Boxing Academy, Yekaterinburg, Russia	Retained WBO Inter-Continental cruiserweight title
5	Win	5–0	Abraham Tabul	TKO	1 (10), 2:49	16 Jun 2019	KRK Uralets, Yekaterinburg, Russia	Won vacant WBO Inter-Continental cruiserweight title
4	Win	4–0	Jose Gregorio Ulrich	UD	8	22 Feb 2019	KRK Uralets, Yekaterinburg, Russia	
3	Win	3–0	Christian Mariscal	TKO	2 (6), 1:38	24 Nov 2018	Hard Rock Live, Atlantic City, New Jersey, U.S.	
2	Win	2–0	Artush Sarkisyan	UD	6	13 Oct 2018	Yekaterinburg Expo, Yekaterinburg, Russia	
1	Win	1–0	Williams Ocando	TKO	5 (6), 2:23	19 Aug 2018	DIVS, Yekaterinburg, Russia	

== Awards and honours ==
- Order of Friendship (2016)
- Certificate of honour of the President of the Russian Federation (2013)
