= Abdulkadir Abdullayev =

Azerbaijani boxer (born 1988)

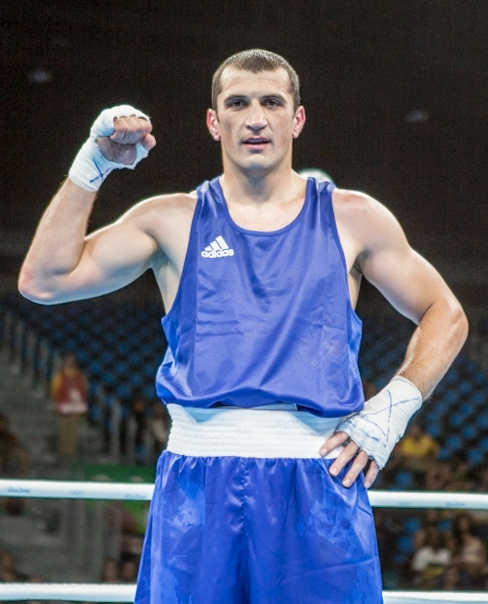
- Abdullayev at the 2016 Olympics

Personal information
- Nationality: Azerbaijani
- Born: 17 July 1988 (age 37) Akusha, Dagestan, Russia
- Height: 188 cm (6 ft 2 in)

Sport
- Sport: Amateur boxing
- Club: Baku Fires
- Coached by: Pedro Roque; Magomed Aripgadjiev
Medal record
Men's amateur boxing
Representing Azerbaijan
World Amateur Championships
Bronze medal – third place	2015 Doha	-91 kg
European Games
Gold medal – first place	2015 Baku	-91 kg

Abdulkadir Abdulla Abdullayev (born 17 July 1988) is an Azerbaijani heavyweight amateur boxer. In 2015 he won a gold medal at the European Games and a bronze at the World Championships. He competed at the 2016 Olympics, but was eliminated in the second bout.
