= 2016 American Boxing Olympic Qualification Tournament =

Boxing competitions

- Location: Buenos Aires, Argentina
- Start date: March 11, 2016
- End date: March 19, 2016

The 2016 American Boxing Olympic Qualification Tournament for the boxing tournament at the 2016 Summer Olympics in Rio de Janeiro, Brazil was held in Buenos Aires, Argentina from March 11 to March 19, 2016. A total of 241 boxers from 35 countries competed.

== Medalists ==
=== Men ===
| Event | Gold | Silver | Bronze |
|---|---|---|---|
| −49 kg | Yuberjen Martinez; Colombia | Nico Hernández; United States | Leandro Blanc; Argentina |
| −49 kg | Yuberjen Martinez; Colombia | Nico Hernández; United States | Víctor Santillan; Dominican Republic |
| −52 kg | Fernando Martínez; Argentina | Leonel de los Santos; Dominican Republic | Ceiber Avila Segura; Colombia |
| −52 kg | Fernando Martínez; Argentina | Leonel de los Santos; Dominican Republic | David Jimenez; Costa Rica |
| −56 kg | Shakur Stevenson; United States | Alberto Melián; Argentina | José Vicente Diaz; Venezuela |
| −56 kg | Shakur Stevenson; United States | Alberto Melián; Argentina | Jose Caraballo; Puerto Rico |
| −60 kg | Luis Angel Cabrera; Venezuela | Teofimo Lopéz; Honduras | Ignacio Perrin; Argentina |
| −60 kg | Luis Angel Cabrera; Venezuela | Teofimo Lopéz; Honduras | David Gauthier; Canada |
| −64 kg | Arthur Biyarslanov; Canada | Luis Arcon; Venezuela | Gary Allen Russell; United States |
| −64 kg | Arthur Biyarslanov; Canada | Luis Arcon; Venezuela | Daniel Tobar; Guatemala |
| −69 kg | Roniel Iglesias; Cuba | Gabriel Maestre; Venezuela | Alberto Ignacio Palmetta; Argentina |
| −69 kg | Roniel Iglesias; Cuba | Gabriel Maestre; Venezuela | Lester Normandy Martinez; Guatemala |
| −75 kg | Charles Conwell; United States | Misael Rodríguez; Mexico | Jorge Vivas; Colombia |
| −75 kg | Charles Conwell; United States | Misael Rodríguez; Mexico | Marlo Delgado; Ecuador |
| −81 kg | Carlos Andres Mina; Ecuador | Albert Ramirez; Venezuela | Jonathan Esquivel; United States |
| −81 kg | Carlos Andres Mina; Ecuador | Albert Ramirez; Venezuela | Juan Carlos Carrillo; Colombia |
| −91 kg | Erislandy Savón; Cuba | Yamil Peralta; Argentina | Juan Nogueira; Brazil |
| −91 kg | Erislandy Savón; Cuba | Yamil Peralta; Argentina | Cam Awesome; United States |
| +91 kg | Lenier Pero; Cuba | Nigel Paul; Trinidad and Tobago | Clayton Laurent; U.S. Virgin Islands |
| +91 kg | Lenier Pero; Cuba | Nigel Paul; Trinidad and Tobago | Kevin Espíndola; Argentina |

=== Women ===
| Event | Gold | Silver | Bronze |
|---|---|---|---|
| −51+ kg | Mandy Bujold; Canada | Ingrit Valencia; Colombia | Virginia Fuchs; United States |
| −51+ kg | Mandy Bujold; Canada | Ingrit Valencia; Colombia | Grazieli Jesus de Sousa; Brazil |
| −60 kg | Mikaela Mayer; United States | Victoria Torres; Mexico | Kiria Tapia; Puerto Rico |
| −60 kg | Mikaela Mayer; United States | Victoria Torres; Mexico | Dayana Sanchez; Argentina |
| −75 kg | Claressa Shields; United States | Ariane Fortin; Canada | Andréa de Oliveira; Brazil |
| −75 kg | Claressa Shields; United States | Ariane Fortin; Canada | Yenebier Guillén; Dominican Republic |

== Qualification summary ==
| NOC | Men | | | | | | | | | | Women | | | Total |
| NOC | 49 | 52 | 56 | 60 | 64 | 69 | 75 | 81 | 91 | +91 | 51 | 60 | 75 | Total |
|---|---|---|---|---|---|---|---|---|---|---|---|---|---|---|
| Argentina | | X | X | | | | | | X | | | | | 3 |
| Brazil | | | | | | | | | X | | | | | 1 |
| Canada | | | | | X | | | | | | X | | X | 3 |
| Colombia | X | | | | | | X | | | | X | | | 3 |
| Cuba | | | | | | | | | X | X | | | | 2 |
| Dominican Republic | | X | | | | | | | | | | | | 1 |
| Ecuador | | | | | | | | X | | | | | | 1 |
| Honduras | | | | X | | | | | | | | | | 1 |
| Mexico | | | | | | X | X | | | | | | | 2 |
| Trinidad and Tobago | | | | | | | | | | X | | | | 1 |
| United States | X | | X | | | X | | | | | | | X | 4 |
| Venezuela | | | | X | X | X | | X | | | | | | 4 |
| Virgin Islands | | | | | | | | | | X | | | | 1 |
| Total: 12 NOCs | 2 | 2 | 2 | 3 | 2 | 3 | 3 | 2 | 3 | 3 | 2 | 1 | 2 | 30 |

== Results ==
=== Men ===
==== Light flyweight (49 kg) ====
The two finalists will qualify to the 2016 Summer Olympics.

Preliminaries
Yuberjen Martinez (COL) | TKO
Todd Napper (CAN)
Angelino Córdova (VEN) | 3
Robinson Rodríguez (CRC) | 0
Yankiel Rivera (PUR) | 3
Elwin Soto (MEX) | 0

Quarterfinals
Carlos Quipo (ECU) | 1
Yuberjen Martinez (COL) | 2
Kevin Arias (NCA) | 0
Víctor Santillan (DOM) | 3
Nico Hernández (USA) | 3
Angelino Córdova (VEN) | 0
Yankiel Rivera (PUR) | 0
Leandro Blanc (ARG) | 3

Semifinals
Yuberjen Martinez (COL) | 3
Víctor Santillan (DOM) | 0
Nico Hernández (USA) | 3
Leandro Blanc (ARG) | 0

Final
Yuberjen Martinez (COL) | 3
Nico Hernández (USA) | 0

| Semifinals | Bronze medal |
| | Víctor Santillan (DOM) |
| | Leandro Blanc (ARG) | WO |

==== Flyweight (52 kg) ====
The two finalists will qualify to the 2016 Summer Olympics.

Preliminaries; March 14
Kevin Humberto Traña (NCA) | 0
Eddie Valenzuela (GUA) | 3
David Jimenez (CRC) | 3
Francisco Rivera (PAN) | 0
Leonel de los Santos (DOM) | 3
Antonio Vargas (USA) | 0

Quarterfinals
Ceiber Avila Segura (COL) | 3
Eddie Valenzuela (GUA) | 0
Anthony Joseph (TTO) | 0
Fernando Martínez (ARG) | 3
Thomas Blumenfield (CAN) | 1
David Jimenez (CRC) | 2
Leonel de los Santos (DOM) | 2
Yoel Finol Rivas (VEN) | 1

Semifinals
Ceiber Avila Segura (COL) | 0
Fernando Martínez (ARG) | 3
David Jimenez (CRC) | 1
Leonel de los Santos (DOM) | 2

Final
Fernando Martínez (ARG) | 2
Leonel de los Santos (DOM) | 1

| Semifinals | Bronze medal |
| | Ceiber Avila Segura (COL) | WO |
| | David Jimenez (CRC) |

==== Bantamweight (56 kg) ====
The two finalists will qualify to the 2016 Summer Olympics.

Round of 32
| | Score | |
|---|---|---|
| Robeisy Ramírez (CUB) | 3-0 | Rafael Pedroza (PAN) |

Preliminaries
Alberto Melián (ARG) | 3
Robeisy Ramírez (CUB) | 0
Sergio Chirino (MEX) | 3
Ricardo Blandón (NCA) | 0
Jose Caraballo (PUR) | 3
Segundo Padilla (ECU) | 0
Ronald Woodside Jr. (BAH) | 0
Juan Reyes Donis (GUA) | 3
Luis Miguel Ruiz (COL) | 1
Shakur Stevenson (USA) | 2
Luis David Vargas (BOL) | 0
Mathías Bagnado (URU) | 3
José Vicente Diaz (VEN) | 3
Dalodtz Sadam Fevry (HAI) | 0
Kenny Lally (CAN) | 2
Héctor García (DOM) | 1

Quarterfinals
Alberto Melián (ARG) | 3
Sergio Chirino (MEX) | 0
Jose Caraballo (PUR) | 2
Juan Reyes Donis (GUA) | 1
Shakur Stevenson (USA) | KO
Mathías Bagnado (URU)
José Vicente Diaz (VEN) | 3
Kenny Lally (CAN) | 0

Semifinals
Alberto Melián (ARG) | 3
Jose Caraballo (PUR) | 0
Shakur Stevenson (USA) | 3
José Vicente Diaz (VEN) | 0

Final
Alberto Melián (ARG) | 0
Shakur Stevenson (USA) | 3

| Semifinals | Bronze medal |
| | Jose Caraballo (PUR) |
| | José Vicente Diaz (VEN) | WO |

==== Lightweight (60 kg) ====
The top three boxers will qualify to the 2016 Summer Olympics.

Preliminaries
Luis Angel Cabrera (VEN) | 3
Henry Lebron (PUR) | 0
Ricardo Carter (JAM) | 0
Michael Alexander (TTO) | 3
Eduardo Estela (URU) | 0
David Gauthier (CAN) | 3
Jaime Muñoz (PAN) | 3
Pierre-Marie Phelissien (HAI) | 0
Ludy Tenorio (ECU) | 0
Teofimo Lopéz (HON) | 3
Brian Alexis Gonzáles (MEX) | TKO
Kolin Lamb (BIZ)
Kevin Alfonso Luna (GUA) | 0
Ignacio Perrin (ARG) | 3
Hamsito Santiago (NCA) | 0
Elvis Rodriguez (DOM) | 3

Quarterfinals
Luis Angel Cabrera (VEN) | WO
Michael Alexander (TTO)
David Gauthier (CAN) | 2
Jaime Muñoz (PAN) | 1
Teofimo Lopéz (HON) | 3
Brian Alexis Gonzáles (MEX) | 0
Ignacio Perrin (ARG) | 3
Elvis Rodriguez (DOM) | 0

Semifinals
Luis Angel Cabrera (VEN) | TKO
David Gauthier (CAN)
Teofimo Lopéz (HON) | 3
Ignacio Perrin (ARG) | 0

Final
Luis Angel Cabrera (VEN) | 2
Teofimo Lopéz (HON) | 1

| Semifinals | Bronze medal |
| | David Gauthier (CAN) |
| | Ignacio Perrin (ARG) | WO |

==== Light welterweight (64 kg) ====
The two finalists will qualify to the 2016 Summer Olympics.

Preliminaries
Ronan Sanchéz (ARG) | 0
Danielito Zorrilla (PUR) | 3
Eduardo Abreu (URU) | 0
Julio Garin (NCA) | 3
Felix Santana (ISV) | 0
Daniel Tobar (GUA) | 3
Eduardo Sánchez (CRC) | 0
Miguel Ferrin (ECU) | 3
Aaron Hassette (TTO)
Rashield Williams (BAH) | KO

Quarterfinals
Arthur Biyarslanov (CAN) | 2
Danielito Zorrilla (PUR) | 1
Julio Garin (NCA) | 0
Daniel Tobar (GUA) | 3
Gary Antuanne Russell (USA) | 3
Miguel Ferrin (ECU) | 0
Rashield Williams (BAH) | 0
Luis Arcon (VEN) | 3

Semifinals
Arthur Biyarslanov (CAN) | 3
Daniel Tobar (GUA) | 0
Gary Antuanne Russell (USA) | 0
Luis Arcon (VEN) | 3

Final
Arthur Biyarslanov (CAN) | 2
Luis Arcon (VEN) | 1

| Semifinals | Bronze medal |
| | Daniel Tobar (GUA) |
| | Gary Antuanne Russell (USA) | WO |

==== Welterweight (69 kg) ====
The top three boxers will qualify to the 2016 Summer Olympics.

Round of 32
| | Score | |
|---|---|---|
| Kestna Davis (JAM) | 0–3 | Juan Ramón Solano (DOM) |
| Daniel Alejandro Muñoz (CHI) | 3–0 | Lyndel Marcellin (LCA) |
| Sasan Haghight-Joo (CAN) | 0–3 | Alberto íetta (ARG) |
| Jose Peguero (ISV) | 0–3 | Quenza Yogly Fraidel (COL) |
| Jonathan François (GRN) | 0–3 | Gabriel Maestre (VEN) |

Preliminaries
Roniel Iglesias (CUB) | 3
Juan Ramón Solano (DOM) | 0
Hopkin Ebanks (CAY) | 0
Paul Kroll (USA) | 3
Aaron Prince (TTO) | 1
Daniel Alejandro Muñoz (CHI) | 2
Alberto Palmetta (ARG) | 3
Abraham Josue Mora (CRC) | 0
Lester Martínez (GUA) | 3
Quenza Yogly Fraidel (COL) | 0
Roberto Custodio de Queiroz (BRA) | 1
Jose Román (PUR) | 2
Snood Duqueney (HAI)
Gustiniano Abel Mina (ECU) | TKO
Gabriel Maestre (VEN) | 3
Juan Pablo Romero (MEX) | 0

Quarterfinals
Roniel Iglesias (CUB) | 3
Paul Kroll (USA) | 0
Daniel Alejandro Muñoz (CHI) | 0
Alberto Palmetta (ARG) | 3
Lester Martínez (GUA) | 3
Jose Román (PUR) | 0
Gustiniano Abel Mina (ECU) | 0
Gabriel Maestre (VEN) | 3

Semifinals
Roniel Iglesias (CUB) | 3
Alberto Palmetta (ARG) | 0
Lester Martínez (GUA) | 1
Gabriel Maestre (VEN) | 2

Final
Roniel Iglesias (CUB) | 3
Gabriel Maestre (VEN) | 0

| Semifinals | Bronze medal |
| | Alberto Palmetta (ARG) | WO |
| | Lester Martínez (GUA) |

==== Middleweight (75 kg) ====
The top three boxers will qualify to the 2016 Summer Olympics.

Round of 32
| | Score | |
|---|---|---|
| Joaquín Lingua (ARG) | 0–3 | Pedro Lima (BRA) |
| Keithland King (VIN) | 3–0 | Joseph Jeudy (HAI) |
| Joseph Cherkashyn (CHI) | 0–3 | Misael Rodríguez (MEX) |
| Jorge Vivas (COL) | TKO | Allan Geban (BIZ) |
| Carl Leviticus Hield (BAH) | 0–3 | Clovis Drolet (CAN) |

Preliminaries
Marlo Delgado (ECU) | 3
Pedro Lima (BRA) | 0
José Luis Rodríguez (PUR) | 3
Dennis Thomas (GUY) | 0
Luis Hernandez (PAN) | 2
Keithland King (VIN) | 1
Misael Rodríguez (MEX) | TKO
Arthur Langelier (LCA)
Jonathan Hanson (JAM) | 0
Jorge Vivas (COL) | 3
Raúl Sánchez (DOM) | 0
Jason Ramirez Blanco (CRC) | 3
Alejandro Mora (URU) | 0
Charles Conwell (USA) | 3
Clovis Drolet (CAN) | 0
Johan Gonzalez (VEN) | 3

Quarterfinals
Marlo Delgado (ECU) | 3
José Luis Rodríguez (PUR) | 0
Luis Hernandez (PAN) | 0
Misael Rodríguez (MEX) | 3
Jorge Vivas (COL) | TKO
Jason Ramirez Blanco (CRC)
Charles Conwell (USA) | 3
Johan Gonzalez (VEN) | 0

Semifinals
Marlo Delgado (ECU)
Misael Rodríguez (MEX) | TKO
Jorge Vivas (COL) | 0
Charles Conwell (USA) | 3

Final
Misael Rodríguez (MEX) | 1
Charles Conwell (USA) | 2

| Semifinals | Bronze medal |
| | Marlo Delgado (ECU) |
| | Jorge Vivas (COL) | WO |

==== Light heavyweight (81 kg) ====
The two finalists will qualify to the 2016 Summer Olympics.

Preliminaries
Julio Alamos (CHI) | 3
Ian Darby (JAM) | 0
Lesy Jean (HAI)
Marcos Escudero (ARG) | TKO
Jonathan Esquivel (USA) | 3
JIsrael Johnson (BAH) | 0
Antony Solano (CRC) | 0
Petru Bolun (CAN) | 3
Osmar Bravo (NCA) | 0
Carlos Andres Mina (ECU) | 3
Desmond Cort Amsterdam (GUY) | 0
Juan Carlos Carrillo (COL) | 3

Quarterfinals
Albert Ramirez (VEN) | 3
Julio Alamos (CHI) | 0
Marcos Escudero (ARG)
Jonathan Esquivel (USA) | TKO
Petru Bolun (CAN) | 0
Carlos Andres Mina (ECU) | 3
Juan Carlos Carrillo (COL) | 3
Rogelio Romero (MEX) | 0

Semifinals
Albert Ramirez (VEN) | 3
Jonathan Esquivel (USA) | 0
Carlos Andres Mina (ECU) | 3
Juan Carlos Carrillo (COL) | 0

Final
Albert Ramirez (VEN) | 0
Carlos Andres Mina (ECU) | 3

| Semifinals | Bronze medal |
| | Jonathan Esquivel (USA) | WO |
| | Juan Carlos Carrillo (COL) |

==== Heavyweight (91 kg) ====
The top three boxers will qualify to the 2016 Summer Olympics.

Preliminaries
Ronald José Gonzalez Silva (VEN) | 0
Julio Cesar Torres (ECU) | 3
Arnaud Sony Jr (HAI) | 3
Louis Jones (BIZ) | 0
Cam Awesome (USA) | TKO
Davon Hamilton (BAH)
Miguel Angel Correa (CHI) | 0
Deivis Blanco (COL) | 3

Quarterfinals
Erislandy Savón (CUB) | 2
Julio Cesar Torres (ECU) | 1
Arnaud Sony Jr (HAI) | 0
Juan Nogueira (BRA) | 3
Samir El Mais (CAN) | 1
Cam Awesome (USA) | 2
Deivis Blanco (COL) | 0
Yamil Peralta (ARG) | 3

Semifinals
Erislandy Savón (CUB) | 3
Juan Nogueira (BRA) | 0
Cam Awesome (USA) | 0
Yamil Peralta (ARG) | 3

Final
Erislandy Savón (CUB) | WO
Yamil Peralta (ARG)

| Semifinals | Bronze medal |
| | Juan Nogueira (BRA) | 2 |
| | Cam Awesome (USA) | 1 |

==== Super heavyweight (+91 kg) ====
The top three boxers will qualify to the 2016 Summer Olympics.

Preliminaries
Jean Carlos Mina (ECU) | 0
Nigel Paul (TTO) | 3
Aaron Huggins (CAN) | 2
Marlo Moore (USA) | 1
Kieshno Major (BAH) | 0
Lenier Pero (CUB) | 3

Quarterfinals
Edgar Muñoz Mata (VEN) | 0
Nigel Paul (TTO) | 3
Elvis García (MEX) | 0
Kevin Espíndola (ARG) | 3
Clayton Laurent (ISV) | 3
Aaron Huggins (CAN) | 0
Lenier Pero (CUB) | 3
Rafael Duarte Lima (BRA) | 0

Semifinals
Nigel Paul (TTO) | 3
Kevin Espíndola (ARG) | 0
Clayton Laurent (ISV) | 0
Lenier Pero (CUB) | 3

Final
Nigel Paul (TTO) | 0
Lenier Pero (CUB) | 3

| Semifinals | Bronze medal |
| | Kevin Espíndola (ARG) |
| | Clayton Laurent (ISV) | KO |

=== Women ===
==== Flyweight (51 kg) ====
The two finalists will qualify to the 2016 Summer Olympics.

Preliminaries
Clara Lescurat (ARG) | 3
Mónica González (PUR) | 0
Grazieli Jesus de Sousa (BRA) | 3
Estefani de León (DOM) | 0
Ingrit Valencia (COL) | 2
Karlha Magliocco (VEN) | 1
Cristina Porozo (ECU) | 0
Sulem Urbina (MEX) | 3

Quarterfinals
Mandy Bujold (CAN) | 3
Clara Lescurat (ARG) | 0
Grazieli Jesus de Sousa (BRA) | 3
Nadia Barriga Villarroel (BOL) | 0
Sarah Joy Rae (JAM) | 0
Ingrit Valencia (COL) | 3
Sulem Urbina (MEX) | 0
Virginia Fuchs (USA) | 3

Semifinals
Mandy Bujold (CAN) | 3
Grazieli Jesus de Sousa (BRA) | 0
Ingrit Valencia (COL) | 3
Virginia Fuchs (USA) | 0

Final
Mandy Bujold (CAN) | 3
Ingrit Valencia (COL) | 0

| Semifinals | Bronze medal |
| | Grazieli Jesus de Sousa (BRA) |
| | Virginia Fuchs (USA) | WO |

==== Lightweight (60 kg) ====
The winner will qualify to the 2016 Summer Olympics.

Preliminaries
Mikaela Mayer (USA) | TKO
Kimberley Gittens (BAR)
Yeni Marcela Arias (COL) | 1
Kiria Tapia (PUR) | 2
Valerian Spicer (DMA) | 3
Cindy Claudio (ISV) | 0
Minerva Montiel (PAR) | 0
Karol Hibbert (PAN) | 3
Scarleth Ojeda (NCA) | 3
Mirquin Sena (DOM) | 0

Quarterfinals
Caroline Veyre (CAN) | 0
Mikaela Mayer (USA) | 3
Kiria Tapia (PUR) | 2
Valerian Spicer (DMA) | 1
Dayana Sanchez (ARG) | 3
Karol Hibbert (PAN) | 0
Scarleth Ojeda (NCA) | 0
Victoria Torres (MEX) | 3

Semifinals
Mikaela Mayer (USA) | 2
Kiria Tapia (PUR) | 0
Dayana Sanchez (ARG) | 0
Victoria Torres (MEX) | 3

Final
Mikaela Mayer (USA) | 3
Victoria Torres (MEX) | 0

| Semifinals | Bronze medal |
| | Kiria Tapia (PUR) | KO |
| | Dayana Sanchez (ARG) |

==== Middleweight (75 kg) ====
The two finalists will qualify to the 2016 Summer Olympics.

| Quarterfinals | | Semifinals | | Final |
| Claressa Shields (USA) | 3 |
| Atheyna Bylon (PAN) | 0 | Claressa Shields (USA) | 3 |
| Yenebier Guillén (DOM) | 3 | Yenebier Guillén (DOM) | 0 |
| Alma Ibarra (MEX) | 0 | | | Claressa Shields (USA) | 3 |
| Lucia Perez (ARG) | 1 | | | Ariane Fortin (CAN) | 0 |
| Andréa de Oliveira (BRA) | 2 | Andréa de Oliveira (BRA) | 1 |
| Francelis Paez (VEN) | 0 | Ariane Fortin (CAN) | 2 |
| Ariane Fortin (CAN) | 3 |

| Semifinals | Bronze medal |
| | Yenebier Guillén (DOM) |
| | Andréa de Oliveira (BRA) | WO |
