= Argentina at the 2016 Summer Olympics =

- IOC code: ARG
- NOC: Argentine Olympic Committee
- Website: www.coarg.org.ar (in Spanish)

in Rio de Janeiro
- Competitors: 213 in 25 sports
- Flag bearers: Luis Scola (opening); Paula Pareto (closing)
- Medals Ranked 26th: Gold 3 Silver 1 Bronze 0 Total 4

Summer Olympics appearances (overview)
- 1900; 1904; 1908; 1912; 1920; 1924; 1928; 1932; 1936; 1948; 1952; 1956; 1960; 1964; 1968; 1972; 1976; 1980; 1984; 1988; 1992; 1996; 2000; 2004; 2008; 2012; 2016; 2020; 2024; 2028

Argentina competed at the 2016 Summer Olympics in Rio de Janeiro, Brazil, from 5 to 21 August 2016. This was the nation's twenty-fourth appearance at the Summer Olympic Games, having missed only three editions since their 1900 debut: the 1904 Summer Olympics in St. Louis, the 1912 Summer Olympics in Stockholm and the 1980 Summer Olympics in Moscow because of its support for the United States-led boycott. The Argentine Olympic Committee (Spanish: Comité Olímpico Argentino) sent the nation's largest ever delegation to the Games in Olympic history, surpassing the record set in London 1948.

On 6 August, judoka Paula Pareto claimed the gold in the women's 48 kg, becoming the first Argentine woman to become an Olympic champion.

== Medalists ==
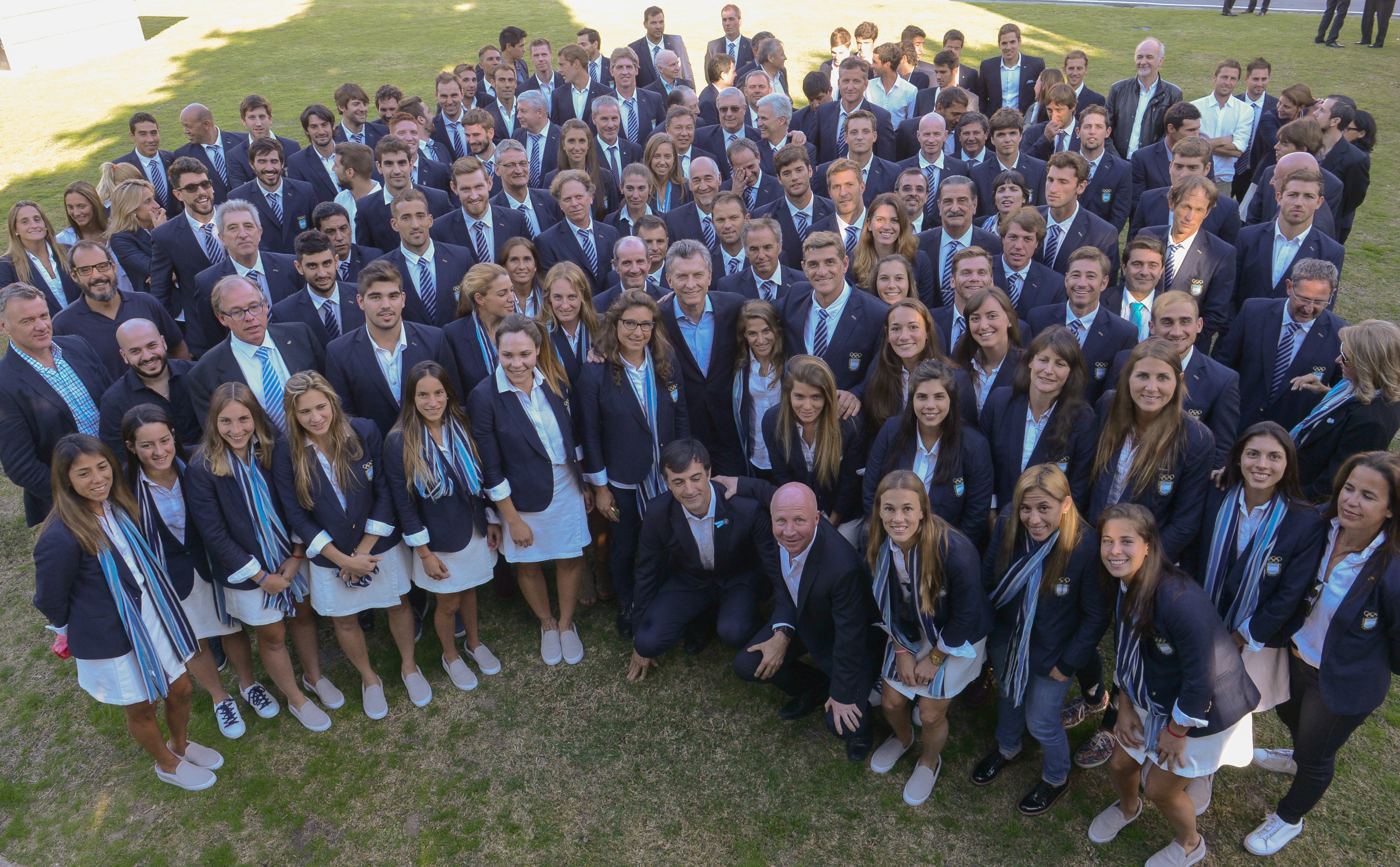
President Mauricio Macri received the Argentine delegation at the Presidential Residence of Olivos after the Games

The following Argentine competitors won medals at the games. In the by discipline sections below, medalists' names are bolded.

Medal	Name	Sport	Event	Date
Gold	Paula Pareto	Judo	Women's 48 kg	6 August
Gold	Santiago Lange; Cecilia Carranza Saroli	Sailing	Nacra 17	16 August
Gold	Argentina men's national field hockey team: Juan Manuel Vivaldi; Gonzalo Peillat; Juan Ignacio Gilardi; Facundo Callioni; Lucas Rey; Matías Paredes; Joaquín Menini; Lucas Vila; Luca Masso; Ignacio Ortiz; Juan Martín Lopez; Juan Manuel Saladino; Matías Rey; Manuel Brunet; Agustín Mazzilli; Lucas Rossi; Pedro Ibarra; Isidoro Ibarra	Field hockey	Men's tournament	18 August
Silver	Juan Martín del Potro	Tennis	Men's singles	14 August

== Competitors ==
The following is the list of number of competitors participating in the Games. Note that reserves in fencing, field hockey, football, and handball are not counted as athletes:

Sport	Men	Women	Total
Athletics	7	6	13
Basketball	12	0	12
Boxing	6	0	6
Canoeing	6	4	10
Cycling	5	1	6
Equestrian	4	0	4
Fencing	0	1	1
Field hockey	16	16	32
Football	18	0	18
Golf	2	0	2
Gymnastics	1	1	2
Handball	14	14	28
Judo	1	1	2
Modern pentathlon	1	1	2
Rowing	1	1	2
Rugby sevens	12	0	12
Sailing	8	5	13
Shooting	2	3	5
Swimming	3	2	5
Synchronized swimming	0	2	2
Tennis	6	0	6
Triathlon	2	0	2
Volleyball	12	14	26
Weightlifting	0	1	1
Wrestling	0	1	1
Total	139	74	213

== Athletics ==
Argentine athletes have so far achieved qualifying standards in the following athletics events (up to a maximum of 3 athletes in each event):

Key

- Note–Ranks given for track events are within the athlete's heat only
- **Q** = Qualified for the next round
- **q** = Qualified for the next round as a fastest loser or, in field events, by position without achieving the qualifying target
- **NR** = National record
- N/A = Round not applicable for the event
- Bye = Athlete not required to compete in round

Track & road events
Men

Athlete	Event	Final	
Athlete	Event	Result	Rank
Juan Manuel Cano	20 km walk	1:27:27	51
Federico Bruno	Marathon	2:40:05	137
Mariano Mastromarino	Marathon	2:18:44	53
Luis Molina	Marathon	2:23:55	89

Women

Athlete	Event	Heat		Final	
Athlete	Event	Result	Rank	Result	Rank
Belén Casetta	3000 m steeplechase	9:51.85	16	did not advance	
Viviana Chávez	Marathon	—N/a		3:03:23	125
Rosa Godoy	Marathon	—N/a		2:52:31	110
María de los Ángeles Peralta	Marathon	—N/a		did not finish	

Field events

Athlete	Event	Qualification		Final	
Athlete	Event	Distance	Position	Distance	Position
Germán Chiaraviglio	Men's pole vault	5.70	7 **q**	5.50	11
Germán Lauro	Men's shot put	19.89	19	did not advance	
Braian Toledo	Men's javelin throw	81.96 **SB**	12 **q**	79.81	10
Rocío Comba	Women's discus throw	54.44	27	did not advance	
Jennifer Dahlgren	Women's hammer throw	63.03	27	did not advance	

== Basketball ==
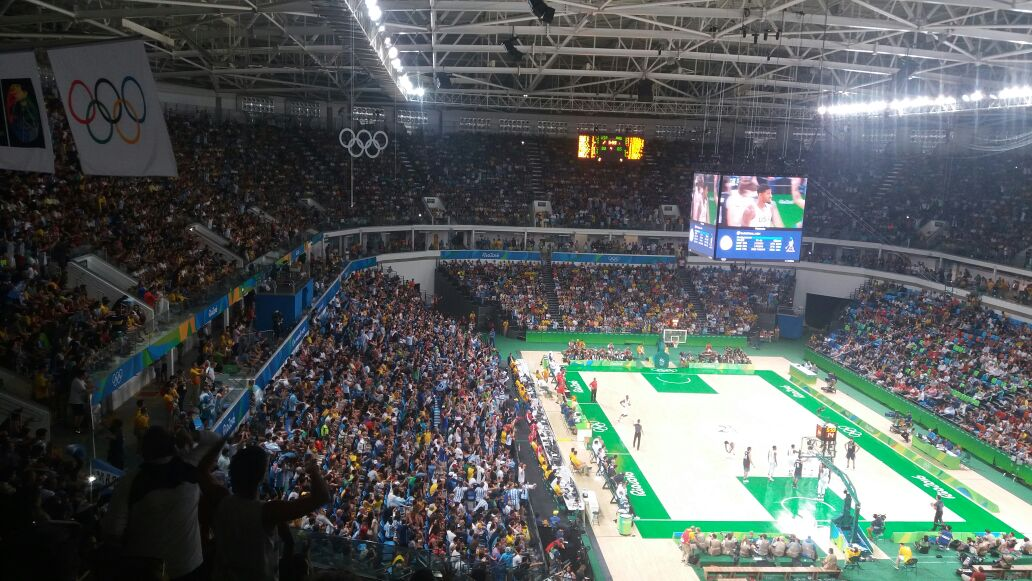
Quarterfinal match between Argentina and the United States

=== Men's tournament ===
Argentina's men's basketball team qualified for the Olympics by attaining a top two finish towards the final match of the 2015 FIBA Americas Championship in Mexico City.

Team roster

The following is the Argentina roster in the men's basketball tournament of the 2016 Summer Olympics.

Argentina men's national basketball team – 2016 Summer Olympics roster
Players
Coaches

Pos.	No.	Name	Age – Date of birth	Height	Club	Ctr.
PF	4	Luis Scola (C)	36 – 30 April 1980	2.06 m (6 ft 9 in)	Brooklyn Nets	(United States)
SG	5	Manu Ginóbili	39 – 28 July 1977	1.98 m (6 ft 6 in)	San Antonio Spurs	(United States)
PG	7	Facundo Campazzo	25 – 23 March 1991	1.80 m (5 ft 11 in)	CB Murcia	(Spain)
PG	8	Nicolás Laprovíttola	26 – 31 January 1990	1.90 m (6 ft 3 in)	Movistar Estudiantes	(Spain)
SG	9	Nicolás Brussino	23 – 2 March 1993	2.00 m (6 ft 7 in)	Peñarol	(Argentina)
SF	10	Carlos Delfino	33 – 29 August 1982	1.98 m (6 ft 6 in)	Unattached
C	12	Marcos Delía	24 – 8 April 1992	2.09 m (6 ft 10 in)	Obras Sanitarias	(Argentina)
SF	13	Andrés Nocioni	36 – 30 November 1979	2.02 m (6 ft 8 in)	Real Madrid	(Spain)
SF	14	Gabriel Deck	21 – 8 February 1995	2.00 m (6 ft 7 in)	Quimsa	(Argentina)
PF	19	Leo Mainoldi	31 – 4 March 1985	2.04 m (6 ft 8 in)	Gimnasia Indalo	(Argentina)
G/F	29	Patricio Garino	23 – 17 May 1993	1.98 m (6 ft 6 in)	George Washington Colonials	(United States)
C	35	Roberto Acuña	25 – 14 September 1990	2.08 m (6 ft 10 in)	Peñarol	(Argentina)

Head coach

- (Argentina) Sergio Hernández

Assistant coach(es)

- (Argentina) Nicolás Casalanguida
- (Argentina) Gonzalo García
- (Argentina) Silvio Santander

Legend

- **(C)** Team captain
- **Club** – describes last
  club before the tournament
- **Age** – describes age
  on 6 August 2016

Group play

Pos	Team	Pld	W	L	PF	PA	PD	Pts	Qualification
1	Croatia	5	3	2	400	407	−7	8 (Note: In games among the four teams at 3–2, Croatia and Spain were 2–1 while Argentina and Lithuania were 1–2. Croatia beat Spain 72–70, and Lithuania beat Argentina 81–73.)	Quarterfinals
2	Spain	5	3	2	432	357	+75	8	Quarterfinals
3	Lithuania	5	3	2	392	428	−36	8	Quarterfinals
4	Argentina	5	3	2	441	428	+13	8	Quarterfinals
5	Brazil (H)	5	2	3	411	407	+4	7	
6	Nigeria	5	1	4	392	441	−49	6	

Source: FIBA
Rules for classification: 1) points; 2) head-to-head points; 3) head-to-head points difference; 4) head-to-head number of points scored.
(H) Hosts
Notes:

7 August 2016
22:30

Boxscore

Nigeria	66–**94**	**Argentina**
Scoring by quarter: 15–**22**, 16–**28**, 19–**22**, 16–**22**
Pts: Diogu 15; Rebs: Diogu 13; Asts: Gbinije, Umeh 3		Pts: Campazzo 19; Rebs: Scola 9 Asts: Campazzo, Ginóbili 5

Carioca Arena 1, Rio de Janeiro
Attendance: 8,425
Referees: Ilija Belošević (SRB), Damir Javor (SLO), Borys Ryzhyk (UKR)

9 August 2016
22:30

Boxscore

**Argentina**	**90**–82	Croatia
Scoring by quarter: 22–22, **24**–18, **27**–14, 17–**28**
Pts: Scola 23; Rebs: Scola 9 Asts: Campazzo 8		Pts: Šarić 19; Rebs: Šarić 10; Asts: Šarić 7

Carioca Arena 1, Rio de Janeiro
Attendance: 8,514
Referees: Christos Christodoulou (GRE), Steven Anderson (USA), José Reyes (MEX)

11 August 2016
22:30

Boxscore

**Lithuania**	**81**–73	Argentina
Scoring by quarter: **16**–15, **14**–12, **27**–22, 24–24
Pts: Kuzminskas 23; Rebs: Valančiūnas 10; Asts: Kalnietis 7		Pts: Ginóbili 22; Rebs: Nocioni, Scola 7 Asts: Scola 4

Carioca Arena 1, Rio de Janeiro
Attendance: 11,093
Referees: Ilija Belošević (SRB), Damir Javor (SLO), Eddie Viator (FRA)

13 August 2016
14:15

Boxscore

**Argentina**	**111**–107 (2OT)	Brazil
Scoring by quarter: **28**–19, 16–**33**, **23**–20, **18**–13, Overtime: 10–10, **16**–12
Pts: Nocioni 37; Rebs: Nocioni 11; Asts: Campazzo 11		Pts: Nenê 24; Rebs: Nenê 10; Asts: Neto 4

Carioca Arena 1, Rio de Janeiro
Attendance: 11,701
Referees: Christos Christodoulou (GRE), Stephen Seibel (CAN), José Reyes (MEX)

15 August 2016
19:00

Boxscore

**Spain**	**92**–73	Argentina
Scoring by quarter: **25**–15, **23**–20, **23**–22, **21**–16
Pts: Fernández 23; Rebs: Gasol 13; Asts: Llull, Rodríguez 5		Pts: Laprovíttola 21; Rebs: three players 5 Asts: Laprovíttola 4

Carioca Arena 1, Rio de Janeiro
Attendance: 10,949
Referees: Christos Christodoulou (GRE), Stephen Seibel (CAN), Roberto Vázquez (PUR)

Quarterfinal

17 August 2016
18:45

Boxscore

**United States**	**105**–78	Argentina
Scoring by quarter: **25**–21, **31**–19, **31**–21, **18**–17
Pts: Durant 27; Rebs: George 8 Asts: Durant 6		Pts: Scola 15; Rebs: Scola 10; Asts: Campazzo 9

Carioca Arena 1, Rio de Janeiro
Attendance: 11,700
Referees: Ilija Belošević (SRB), Guilherme Locatelli (BRA), Robert Lottermoser (GER)

== Boxing ==
Argentina has entered five boxers to compete in each of the following weight classes into the Olympic boxing tournament. Fernando Martínez, Ignacio Perrin, Alberto Palmetta, and 2012 Olympians Alberto Melián and Yamil Peralta had claimed their Olympic spots at the 2016 American Qualification Tournament in Buenos Aires. Leandro Blanc rounded out the Argentine roster with his box-off victory at the 2016 APB and WSB Olympic Qualifier in Vargas, Venezuela.

Athlete	Event	Round of 32	Round of 16	Quarterfinals	Semifinals	Final	
Athlete	Event	Opposition Result	Opposition Result	Opposition Result	Opposition Result	Opposition Result	Rank
Leandro Blanc	Men's light flyweight	Velázquez (MEX); **L** 0–3	did not advance				
Fernando Martínez	Men's flyweight	Asenov (BUL); **L** 1–2	did not advance				
Alberto Melián	Men's bantamweight	Omar (GHA); **W** 3–0	Mhamdi (TUN); **W** 3–0	Akhmadaliev (UZB); **L** TKO	did not advance		
Ignacio Perrín	Men's lightweight	Ruenroeng (THA); **L** 0–3	did not advance				
Alberto Palmetta	Men's welterweight	Tüvshinbat (MGL); **L** 0–3	did not advance				
Yamil Peralta	Men's heavyweight	Bye	Graf (GER); **W** 2–1	Savón (CUB); **L** 0–3	did not advance		

== Canoeing ==
=== Slalom ===
Argentina has qualified one boat in the men's slalom C-1 for the Games, as the International Canoe Federation accepted the nation's request to claim a spare berth freed by the United States. The slot was awarded to London 2012 Olympian Sebastián Rossi, who finished fourth at the 2015 Pan American Games in Toronto.

Athlete	Event	Preliminary						Semifinal		Final	
Athlete	Event	Run 1	Rank	Run 2	Rank	Best	Rank	Time	Rank	Time	Rank
Sebastián Rossi	Men's C-1	108.81	13	155.70	18	108.81	17	did not advance			

=== Sprint ===
Argentine canoeists have qualified one boat in each of the following events through the 2015 ICF Canoe Sprint World Championships.

Men

Athlete	Event	Heats		Semifinals		Final	
Athlete	Event	Time	Rank	Time	Rank	Time	Rank
Rubén Voisard	K-1 200 m	35.491	6 **Q**	35.439	7 **FB**	38.061	16
Daniel Dal Bo; Juan Ignacio Cáceres; Gonzalo Carreras; Pablo de Torres	K-4 1000 m	2:55.103	2 **Q**	3:00.952	6 **FB**	3:12.621	12

Women

Athlete	Event	Heats		Semifinals		Final	
Athlete	Event	Time	Rank	Time	Rank	Time	Rank
Sabrina Ameghino	K-1 200 m	42.417	6 **Q**	41.934	6	did not advance	
Sabrina Ameghino; Alexandra Keresztesi; Magdalena Garro; Brenda Rojas	K-4 500 m	1:37.645	7 **Q**	1:38.579	6 **FB**	1:41.394	13

Qualification Legend: FA = Qualify to final (medal); FB = Qualify to final B (non-medal)

== Cycling ==
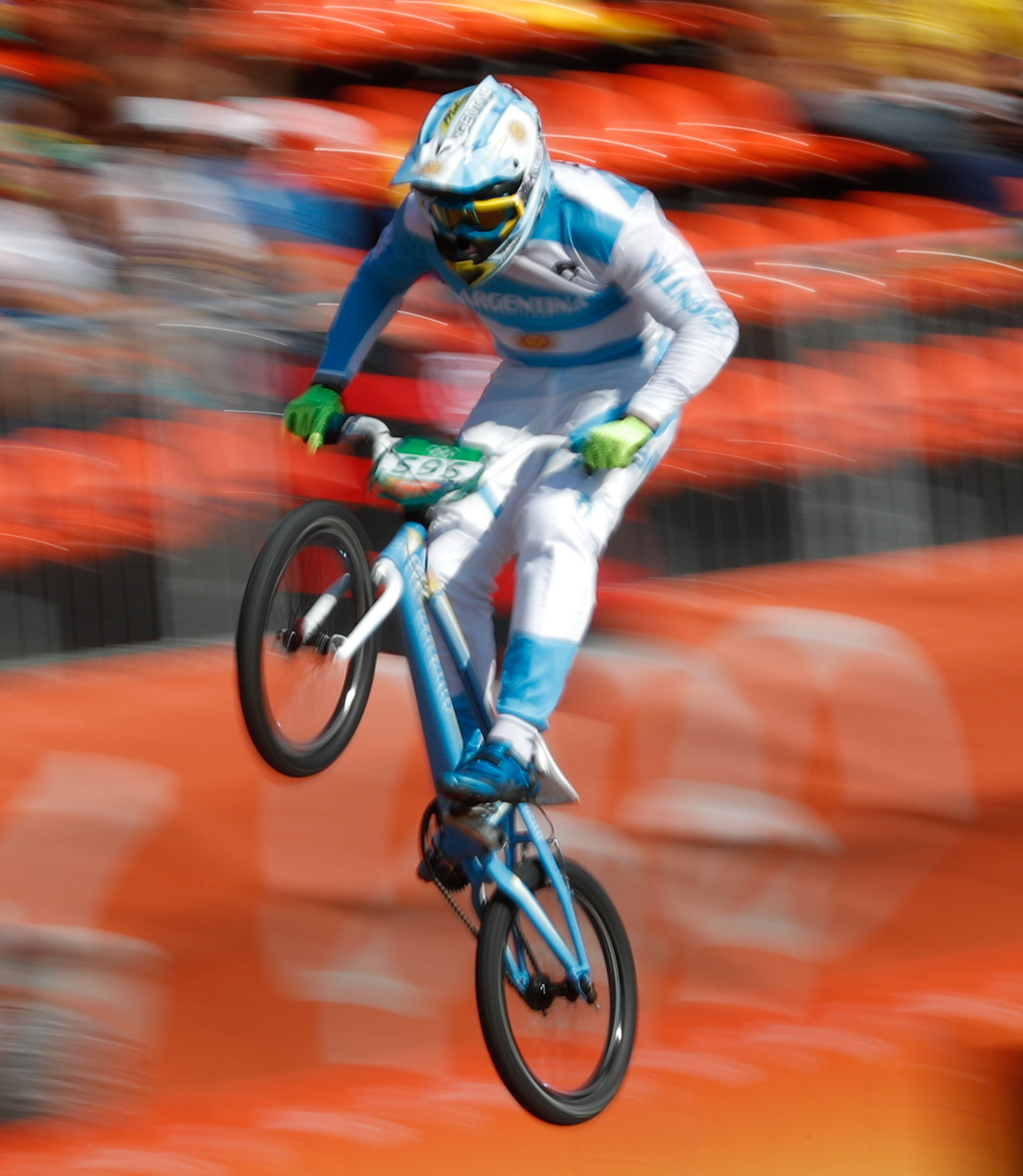
BMX rider Gonzalo Molina

=== Road ===
Argentine riders qualified for a maximum of three quota places in the men's Olympic road race by virtue of their top 5 national ranking in the 2015 UCI America Tour.

Athlete	Event	Time	Rank
Daniel Díaz	Men's road race	did not finish	
Maximiliano Richeze	Men's road race	did not finish	
Eduardo Sepúlveda	Men's road race	6:22:23	37
Eduardo Sepúlveda	Men's time trial	1:19:07.84	26

=== Mountain biking ===
Argentina has qualified one mountain biker for the men's Olympic cross-country race, as a result of his nation's sixteenth-place finish in the UCI Olympic Ranking List of 25 May 2016.

Athlete	Event	Time	Rank
Catriel Soto	Men's cross-country	1:42:01	25

=== BMX ===
Argentine riders qualified for one men's and one women's quota place for BMX at the Olympics, as a result of the nation's eighth-place finish for men in the UCI Olympic Ranking List and top three for women in the UCI BMX Individual Ranking List of 31 May 2016.

Athlete	Event	Seeding		Quarterfinal		Semifinal		Final	
Athlete	Event	Result	Rank	Points	Rank	Points	Rank	Result	Rank
Gonzalo Molina	Men's BMX	36.860	29	10	4 **Q**	16	6	did not advance	
María Gabriela Díaz	Women's BMX	40.073	16	—N/a		17	5	did not advance	

== Equestrian ==
Argentina has entered a squad of four riders in the team jumping competition by virtue a top two national finish at the 2015 Pan American Games in Toronto, Canada.

Athlete	Horse	Event	Qualification								Final					Total	
Athlete	Horse	Event	Round 1		Round 2			Round 3			Round A		Round B			Total	
Athlete	Horse	Event	Penalties	Rank	Penalties	Total	Rank	Penalties	Total	Rank	Penalties	Rank	Penalties	Total	Rank	Penalties	Rank
Matías Albarracín	Cannavaro	Individual	4	=27 **Q**	1	5	26 **Q**	5	10	30 **Q**	1	14 **Q**	1	2	8	2	8
José Maria Larocca	Cornet du Lys	Individual	4	=27 **Q**	8	12	46	did not advance									
Bruno Passaro	Chicago	Individual	47 #	68	did not advance												
Ramiro Quintana	Whitney	Individual	7	=52 **Q**	1	8	30 **Q**	10	18	40	did not advance						
Matías Albarracín; José Maria Larocca; Bruno Passaro; Ramiro Quintana	See above	Team	15	13	10	—N/a	10	did not advance			—N/a					25	10

"#" indicates that the score of this rider does not count in the team competition, since only the best three results of a team are counted.

== Fencing ==
Argentina has entered one fencer into the Olympic competition. London 2012 Olympian María Belén Pérez Maurice had claimed the Olympic spot in the women's sabre as one of the two highest-ranked fencers coming from the America zone in the FIE Adjusted Official Rankings.

Athlete	Event	Round of 64	Round of 32	Round of 16	Quarterfinal	Semifinal	Final / BM	
Athlete	Event	Opposition Score	Opposition Score	Opposition Score	Opposition Score	Opposition Score	Opposition Score	Rank
María Belén Pérez Maurice	Women's sabre	Bye	Berder (FRA); **L** 6–15	did not advance				

== Field hockey ==
Summary

Key:
- FT – After full-time.
- P – Match decided by penalty-shootout.

Team	Event	Group Stage						Quarterfinal	Semifinal	Final / BM	
Team	Event	Opposition Score	Opposition Score	Opposition Score	Opposition Score	Opposition Score	Rank	Opposition Score	Opposition Score	Opposition Score	Rank
**Argentina men's**	Men's tournament	Netherlands; **D** 3–3	Canada; **W** 3–1	India; **L** 1–2	Germany; **D** 4–4	Ireland; **W** 3–2	3	Spain; **W** 2–1	Germany; **W** 5–2	Belgium; **W** 4–2	1st place, gold medalist(s)
Argentina women's	Women's tournament	United States; **L** 1–2	Japan; **W** 4–0	Great Britain; **L** 2–3	Australia; **L** 0–1	India; **W** 5–0	4	Netherlands; **L** 2–3	did not advance		7

=== Men's tournament ===
Argentina's men's field hockey team qualified for the Olympics by having achieved a top three finish at the 2014–15 Men's FIH Hockey World League Semifinals.

Team roster

The following is the Argentina roster in the men's field hockey tournament of the 2016 Summer Olympics.

Head coach: Carlos Retegui

1. Juan Manuel Vivaldi (GK)
2. Gonzalo Peillat
4. Juan Ignacio Gilardi
5. Pedro Ibarra (C)
7. Facundo Callioni
8. Lucas Rey
10. Matías Paredes
11. Joaquín Menini
12. Lucas Vila
14. Luca Masso
16. Ignacio Ortiz
17. Juan Martín López
19. Juan Manuel Saladino
20. Isidoro Ibarra
22. Matías Rey
24. Manuel Brunet
26. Agustín Mazzilli
27. Lucas Rossi

Reserves:

- Tomás Santiago (GK)

Group play

Pos	Team	Pld	W	D	L	GF	GA	GD	Pts	Qualification
1	Germany	5	4	1	0	17	10	+7	13	Quarter-finals
2	Netherlands	5	3	1	1	18	6	+12	10	Quarter-finals
3	Argentina	5	2	2	1	14	12	+2	8	Quarter-finals
4	India	5	2	1	2	9	9	0	7	Quarter-finals
5	Ireland	5	1	0	4	10	16	−6	3	
6	Canada	5	0	1	4	7	22	−15	1	

Source: Rio2016
Rules for classification: 1) Points; 2) Matches won; 3) Goal difference; 4) Goals for; 5) Head-to-head result.

6 August 2016
10:00

Argentina	3–3	Netherlands
Vila 29', 49'; Paredes 54'	Report	Hertzberger 18'; Van der Weerden 36'; Van Ass 43'

Umpires:
Martin Madden (GBR)
Adam Kearns (AUS)

8 August 2016
12:30

Canada	1–3	Argentina
Tupper 55'	Report	Paredes 13'; Peillat 46', 51'

Umpires:
Adam Kearns (AUS)
Simon Taylor (NZL)

9 August 2016
11:00

Argentina	1–2	India
Peillat 49'	Report	C. Singh 8'; K. Singh 35'

Umpires:
Paco Vázquez (ESP)
Simon Taylor (NZL)

11 August 2016
12:30

Argentina	4–4	Germany
Vila 4'; P. Ibarra 29'; Peillat 48'; M. Rey 57'	Report	Herzbruch 15'; Wesley 24'; Grambusch 28'; Müller 60'

Umpires:
Adam Kearns (AUS)
Paco Vázquez (ESP)

12 August 2016
19:30

Ireland	2–3	Argentina
Jermyn 25'; O'Donoghue 51'	Report	Saladino 8'; Peillat 27', 51'

Umpires:
Simon Taylor (NZL)
Paco Vázquez (ESP)

Quarterfinal

14 August 2016
10:00

Spain	1–2	Argentina
Quemada 57'	Report	Peillat 15'; Gilardi 59'

Umpires:
Martin Madden (GBR)
Adam Kearns (AUS)

Semifinal

16 August 2016
12:00

Argentina	5–2	Germany
Peillat 9', 12', 28'; Menini 36'; Vila 47'	Report	Fürste 51'; Rühr 58'

Umpires:
Marcin Grochal (POL)
John Wright (RSA)

Gold medal match

18 August 2016
17:00

Belgium	2–4	Argentina
Cosyns 3'; Boccard 45'	Report	P. Ibarra 12'; Ortiz 15'; Peillat 22'; Mazzilli 60'

Umpires:
John Wright (RSA)
Christian Blasch (GER)

=== Women's tournament ===
Argentina's women's field hockey team qualified for the Olympics by having achieved a top four finish at the 2014–15 Women's FIH Hockey World League Semifinals.

Team roster

The following is the Argentina roster in the women's field hockey tournament of the 2016 Summer Olympics.

Head coach: Gabriel Minadeo

No.	Pos.	Player	Date of birth (age)	Caps	Goals	Club
1	GK	Belén Succi	16 October 1985 (aged 30)	167		(Argentina) CASI
3	DF	Victoria Zuloaga	14 February 1989 (aged 27)	62		(Argentina) Mar del Plata Club
7	FW	Martina Cavallero	7 May 1990 (aged 26)	150		(Argentina) Hurling
11	FW	Carla Rebecchi (c)	7 September 1984 (aged 31)	277		(Argentina) Ciudad de Buenos Aires
12	FW	Delfina Merino	15 October 1989 (aged 26)	218		(Argentina) Banco Provincia
14	DF	Agustina Habif	8 March 1992 (aged 24)	80		(Argentina) GEBA
15	FW	María José Granatto	21 April 1995 (aged 21)	37		(Argentina) Santa Bárbara
16	MF	Florencia Habif	22 August 1993 (aged 22)	132		(Netherlands) Pinoké
17	MF	Rocío Sánchez Moccia	2 August 1988 (aged 28)	173		(Argentina) Liceo Naval
19	FW	Agustina Albertarrio	1 January 1993 (aged 23)	84		(Argentina) Lomas
20	MF	Lucina von der Heyde	24 January 1997 (aged 19)	18		(Argentina) River Plate
23	MF	Pilar Campoy	6 October 1990 (aged 25)	29		(Argentina) Hacoaj
25	MF	Gabriela Aguirre	19 February 1986 (aged 30)	84		(Argentina) Banco Provincia
27	DF	Noel Barrionuevo	16 May 1984 (aged 32)	274		(Argentina) Ciudad de Buenos Aires
29	DF	Julia Gomes Fantasia	30 April 1992 (aged 24)	95		(Argentina) GEBA
31	GK	Florencia Mutio	20 November 1984 (aged 31)	48		(Argentina) San Fernando

Reserves:

- Paula Ortiz
- Pilar Romang

Group play

Pos	Team	Pld	W	D	L	GF	GA	GD	Pts	Qualification
1	Great Britain	5	5	0	0	12	4	+8	15	Quarter-finals
2	United States	5	4	0	1	14	5	+9	12	Quarter-finals
3	Australia	5	3	0	2	11	5	+6	9	Quarter-finals
4	Argentina	5	2	0	3	12	6	+6	6	Quarter-finals
5	Japan	5	0	1	4	3	16	−13	1	
6	India	5	0	1	4	3	19	−16	1	

Source: Rio2016
Rules for classification: 1) Points; 2) Matches won; 3) Goal difference; 4) Goals for; 5) Head-to-head result.

6 August 2016
17:00

Argentina	1–2	United States
Merino 56'	Report	K. Reinprecht 35'; Kasold 50'

Umpires:
Michelle Joubert (RSA)
Michelle Meister (GER)

8 August 2016
20:30

Argentina	4–0	Japan
Barrionuevo 13', 18'; Rebecchi 48'; Granatto 50'	Report

Umpires:
Melissa Trivic (AUS)
Laurine Delforge (BEL)

10 August 2016
13:30

Great Britain	3–2	Argentina
H. Richardson-Walsh 23', 25'; Bray 38'	Report	F. Habif 41', 42'

Umpires:
Michelle Meister (GER)
Miao Lin (CHN)

11 August 2016
18:00

Australia	1–0	Argentina
Smith 33'	Report

Umpires:
Laurine Delforge (BEL)
Amy Baxter (USA)

13 August 2016
10:00

Argentina	5–0	India
Cavallero 16', 29'; Granatto 23'; Rebecchi 26'; Albertarrio 27'	Report

Umpires:
Chieko Soma (JPN)
Sarah Wilson (GBR)

Quarterfinal

15 August 2016
20:30

Netherlands	3–2	Argentina
Welten 5'; Leurink 25'; Jonker 47'	Report	F. Habif 41'; Merino 53'

Umpires:
Michelle Joubert (RSA)
Laurine Delforge (BEL)

== Football ==
=== Men's tournament ===
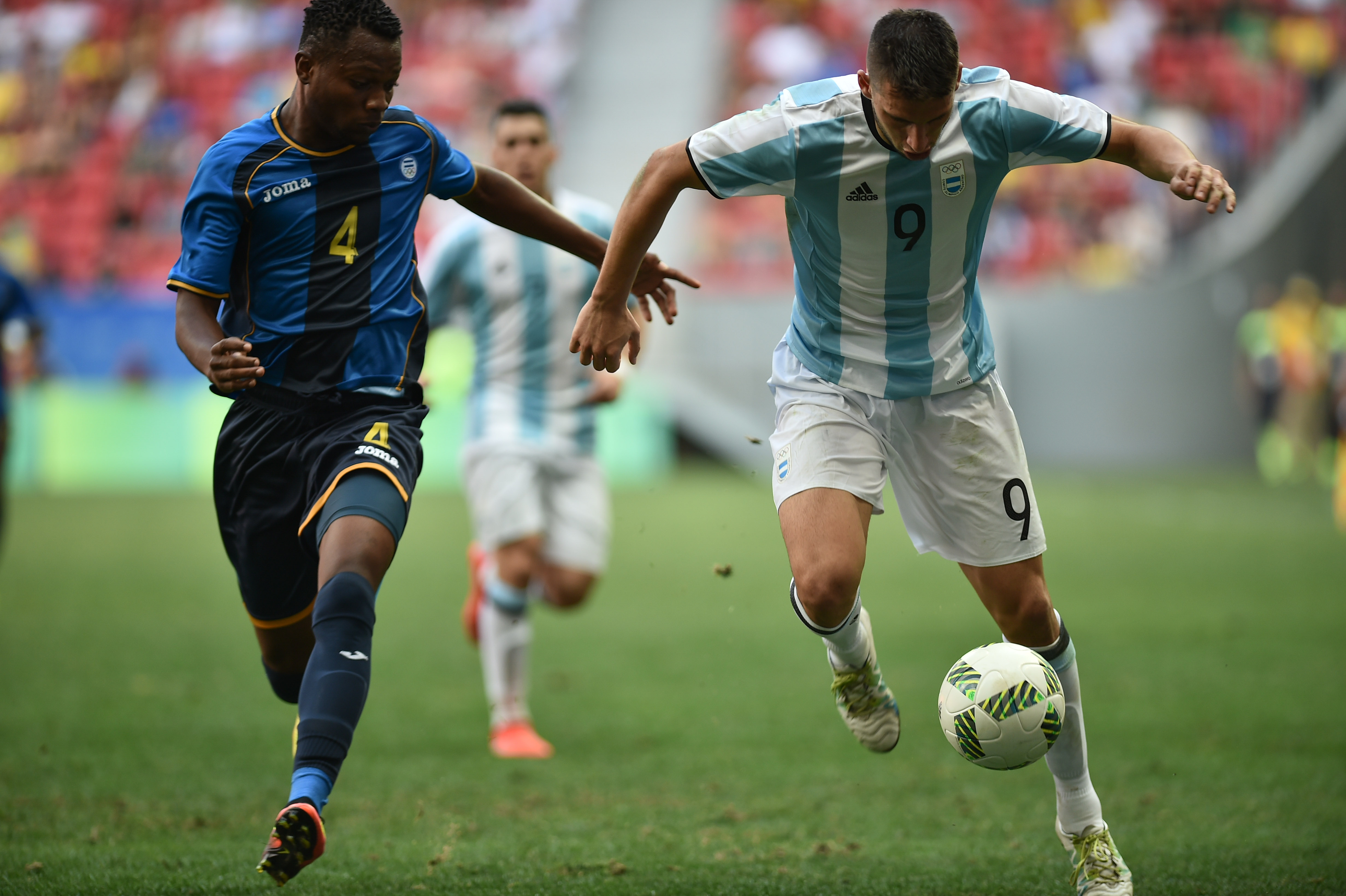
Argentina vs. Honduras match

Argentina's men's football team qualified for the Olympics after sealing their triumph at the 2015 South American Youth Championship in Uruguay.

Team roster

The following is the Argentina squad in the men's football tournament of the 2016 Summer Olympics. The team of 18 players was officially named on 6 July and confirmed on 14 July. On 26 July, Manuel Lanzini left the squad due to injury and was replaced by Cristian Pavón.

Head coach: Julio Olarticoechea

No.	Pos.	Player	Date of birth (age)	Caps	Goals	Club
1	GK	Gerónimo Rulli*	20 May 1992 (aged 24)	3	0	(Royal Spanish Football Federation) Real Sociedad
2	DF	Lautaro Gianetti	13 November 1993 (aged 22)	3	0	(Argentine Football Association) Vélez Sarsfield
3	DF	Alexis Soto	20 October 1993 (aged 22)	3	0	(Argentine Football Association) Banfield
4	DF	José Luis Gómez	13 September 1993 (aged 22)	3	0	(Argentine Football Association) Lanús
5	MF	Lucas Romero	18 April 1994 (aged 22)	1	0	(Brazilian Football Confederation) Cruzeiro
6	DF	Víctor Cuesta* (c)	19 November 1988 (aged 27)	2	0	(Argentine Football Association) Independiente
7	MF	Cristian Pavón	21 January 1996 (aged 20)	3	0	(Argentine Football Association) Boca Juniors
8	MF	Santiago Ascacíbar	25 February 1997 (aged 19)	3	0	(Argentine Football Association) Estudiantes
9	FW	Jonathan Calleri	23 September 1993 (aged 22)	3	1	(Brazilian Football Confederation) São Paulo
10	FW	Ángel Correa	9 March 1995 (aged 21)	3	1	(Royal Spanish Football Federation) Atlético Madrid
11	FW	Giovanni Simeone	5 July 1995 (aged 21)	3	0	(Argentine Football Association) Banfield
12	GK	Axel Werner	28 February 1996 (aged 20)	0	0	(Argentine Football Association) Atlético de Rafaela
13	MF	Joaquín Arzura	18 May 1993 (aged 23)	0	0	(Argentine Football Association) River Plate
14	MF	Giovani Lo Celso	9 April 1996 (aged 20)	3	0	(Argentine Football Association) Rosario Central
15	DF	Lisandro Magallán	27 September 1993 (aged 22)	1	0	(Argentine Football Association) Boca Juniors
16	DF	Leandro Vega	27 May 1996 (aged 20)	1	0	(Argentine Football Association) River Plate
17	MF	Mauricio Martínez	20 February 1993 (aged 23)	3	1	(Argentine Football Association) Rosario Central
18	FW	Cristian Espinoza	3 April 1995 (aged 21)	3	0	(Argentine Football Association) Huracán

* Over-aged player.

Group play

Pos	Team	Pld	W	D	L	GF	GA	GD	Pts	Qualification
1	Portugal	3	2	1	0	5	2	+3	**7**	Quarter-finals
2	Honduras	3	1	1	1	5	5	0	**4**	Quarter-finals
**3**	Argentina	**3**	**1**	**1**	**1**	**3**	**4**	**−1**	**4**	
4	Algeria	3	0	1	2	4	6	−2	**1**	

Source: Rio2016 & FIFA
Rules for classification: Tiebreakers
4 August 2016
18:00

Portugal	2–0	Argentina
Paciência 66'; Pité 84'	Report (Rio2016); Report (FIFA)

Estádio Olímpico João Havelange, Rio de Janeiro
Attendance: 37,407
Referee: Walter López Castellanos (Guatemala)

7 August 2016
18:00

Argentina	2–1	Algeria
Correa 47'; Calleri 70'	Report (Rio2016); Report (FIFA)	Bendebka 64'

Estádio Olímpico João Havelange, Rio de Janeiro
Attendance: 37,450
Referee: Cüneyt Çakır (Turkey)

10 August 2016
13:00

Argentina	1–1	Honduras
Martínez 90+3'	Report (Rio2016); Report (FIFA)	Lozano 75' (pen.)

Estádio Nacional Mané Garrincha, Brasília
Attendance: 16,029
Referee: Antonio Mateu Lahoz (Spain)

== Golf ==
Argentina has entered two golfers into the Olympic tournament. Emiliano Grillo (world no. 44) and Fabián Gómez (world no. 73) qualified directly among the top 60 eligible players for the men's event based on the IGF World Rankings as of 11 July 2016.

Athlete	Event	Round 1	Round 2	Round 3	Round 4	Total		
Athlete	Event	Score	Score	Score	Score	Score	Par	Rank
Emiliano Grillo	Men's	70	69	68	70	277	−7	=8
Fabián Gómez	Men's	70	67	73	69	279	−5	=15

== Gymnastics ==
=== Artistic ===
Argentina has entered two artistic gymnasts into the Olympic competition. Ailen Valente claimed her Olympic spot in the women's apparatus and all-around events at the Olympic Test Event in Rio de Janeiro. Meanwhile, Nicolás Córdoba received a spare Olympic berth freed up by Portugal's Gustavo Simões, who withdrew from the Games due to a severe fracture in his left foot, to compete in the men's events.

Men

Athlete	Event	Qualification								Final							
Athlete	Event	Apparatus						Total	Rank	Apparatus						Total	Rank
Athlete	Event	F	PH	R	V	PB	HB	Total	Rank	F	PH	R	V	PB	HB	Total	Rank
Nicolás Córdoba	Horizontal bar	—N/a					14.800	14.800	18	did not advance							

Women

Athlete	Event	Qualification						Final					
Athlete	Event	Apparatus				Total	Rank	Apparatus				Total	Rank
Athlete	Event	V	UB	BB	F	Total	Rank	V	UB	BB	F	Total	Rank
Ailen Valente	All-around	13.666	13.033	11.366	12.000	50.065	56	did not advance					

== Handball ==
Summary

Key:
- ET: After extra time
- P – Match decided by penalty-shootout.

Team	Event	Group Stage						Quarterfinal	Semifinal	Final / BM	
Team	Event	Opposition Score	Opposition Score	Opposition Score	Opposition Score	Opposition Score	Rank	Opposition Score	Opposition Score	Opposition Score	Rank
Argentina men's	Men's tournament	Denmark; **L** 19–25	Croatia; **L** 26–27	France; **L** 24–31	Tunisia; **W** 23–21	Qatar; **L** 18–22	5	did not advance			10
Argentina women's	Women's tournament	Sweden; **L** 21–31	Netherlands; **L** 18–26	France; **L** 11–27	Russia; **L** 29–35	South Korea; **L** 22–28	6	did not advance			12

=== Men's tournament ===
Argentina's men's handball team qualified for the Olympics, after securing a spot in the gold medal match and having attained an automatic berth by virtue of Olympic host nation Brazil's win in the other semifinal at the 2015 Pan American Games in Toronto, Canada.

Team roster

The following is the Argentine roster in the men's handball tournament of the 2016 Summer Olympics.

Head coach: Eduardo Gallardo

No.	Pos.	Name	Date of birth (age)	Height	App.	Goals	Club
1	GK	Matías Schulz	12 February 1982 (aged 34)	1.90 m	172	0	(Switzerland) Pfadi Winterthur
2	LW	Federico Fernández	17 October 1989 (aged 26)	1.87 m	94	335	(Argentina) UNLu
3	RW	Federico Pizarro	6 July 1986 (aged 30)	1.83 m	127	568	(Argentina) UNLu
4	CB	Sebastián Simonet	12 May 1986 (aged 30)	1.90 m	76	328	(Spain) Ademar León
5	P	Pablo Sebastián Portela	21 June 1980 (aged 36)	1.90 m	127	62	(Argentina) Colegio Ward
8	LB	Pablo Simonet	4 May 1992 (aged 24)	1.89 m	48	98	(Spain) Benidorm
9	RB	Leonardo Facundo Querín	17 April 1982 (aged 34)	1.97 m	159	238	(France) Billère
10	RB	Federico Matías Vieyra	21 July 1988 (aged 28)	1.92 m	101	235	(Spain) Ademar León
12	GK	Fernando Gabriel García	31 August 1981 (aged 34)	1.90 m	193	5	(France) Vernon
13	LB	Juan Pablo Fernández	30 September 1988 (aged 27)	1.90 m	101	303	(Argentina) UNLu
14	LB	Agustín Vidal	8 July 1987 (aged 29)	1.94 m	80	162	(Spain) Ciudad Encantada
15	P	Gonzalo Carou	15 August 1979 (aged 36)	1.94 m	202	450	(France) Istres
18	LW	Adrián Portela	8 March 1986 (aged 30)	1.83 m	37	112	(Argentina) River Plate
23	RW	Pablo Vainstein	18 July 1987 (aged 29)	1.83 m	35	45	(Argentina) Colegio Ward

Group play

Pos	Team	Pld	W	D	L	GF	GA	GD	Pts	Qualification
1	Croatia	5	4	0	1	147	134	+13	8 (Note: Croatia 29–28 France)	Quarter-finals
2	France	5	4	0	1	152	126	+26	8	Quarter-finals
3	Denmark	5	3	0	2	136	127	+9	6	Quarter-finals
4	Qatar	5	2	1	2	122	127	−5	5	Quarter-finals
5	Argentina	5	1	0	4	110	126	−16	2	
6	Tunisia	5	0	1	4	118	145	−27	1	

Source: IHF
Rules for classification: 1) Points; 2) Head-to-head points; 3) Head-to-head goal difference; 4) Head-to-head goals scored; 5) Goal difference; 6) Goals scored; 7) Draw.
Notes:

7 August 2016; 14:40	**Denmark**	**25–19**	**Argentina**	Future Arena, Rio de Janeiro; Referees: Lah, Sok (SLO)
7 August 2016; 14:40	Hansen, Svan 6	(10–10)	Simonet 7	Future Arena, Rio de Janeiro; Referees: Lah, Sok (SLO)
7 August 2016; 14:40	3× (yellow card) 4× (suspension) 1× (red card)	Report	3× (yellow card) 3× (suspension)	Future Arena, Rio de Janeiro; Referees: Lah, Sok (SLO)

9 August 2016; 21:50	**Argentina**	**26–27**	**Croatia**	Future Arena, Rio de Janeiro; Referees: Rashed, El-Sayed (EGY)
9 August 2016; 21:50	F. Fernández 8	(15–14)	Štrlek 7	Future Arena, Rio de Janeiro; Referees: Rashed, El-Sayed (EGY)
9 August 2016; 21:50	2× (yellow card) 4× (suspension) 1× (red card)	Report	4× (yellow card) 3× (suspension)	Future Arena, Rio de Janeiro; Referees: Rashed, El-Sayed (EGY)

11 August 2016; 21:50	**France**	**31–24**	**Argentina**	Future Arena, Rio de Janeiro; Referees: Nikolov, Nachevski (MKD)
11 August 2016; 21:50	Abalo 7	(17–12)	F. Fernández 8	Future Arena, Rio de Janeiro; Referees: Nikolov, Nachevski (MKD)
11 August 2016; 21:50	3× (yellow card) 4× (suspension) 1× (red card)	Report	3× (yellow card) 5× (suspension)	Future Arena, Rio de Janeiro; Referees: Nikolov, Nachevski (MKD)

13 August 2016; 21:50	**Argentina**	**23–21**	**Tunisia**	Future Arena, Rio de Janeiro; Referees: Koo, Lee (KOR)
13 August 2016; 21:50	Pizarro 7	(14–10)	Boughanmi 8	Future Arena, Rio de Janeiro; Referees: Koo, Lee (KOR)
13 August 2016; 21:50	3× (yellow card) 5× (suspension)	Report	4× (yellow card) 4× (suspension) 1× (red card)	Future Arena, Rio de Janeiro; Referees: Koo, Lee (KOR)

15 August 2016; 21:50	**Qatar**	**22–18**	**Argentina**	Future Arena, Rio de Janeiro; Referees: López, Ramírez (ESP)
15 August 2016; 21:50	Capote, Memišević 4	(12–9)	Simonet 5	Future Arena, Rio de Janeiro; Referees: López, Ramírez (ESP)
15 August 2016; 21:50	3× (yellow card) 4× (suspension)	Report	4× (yellow card) 4× (suspension)	Future Arena, Rio de Janeiro; Referees: López, Ramírez (ESP)

=== Women's tournament ===
Argentina's women's handball team qualified for the Olympics, after securing a spot in the gold medal match and having attained an automatic berth by virtue of Olympic host nation Brazil's win in the other semifinal at the 2015 Pan American Games in Toronto, Canada.

Team roster

The following is the Argentine roster in the women's handball tournament of the 2016 Summer Olympics.

Head coach: Eduardo Peruchena

No.	Pos.	Name	Date of birth (age)	Height	App.	Goals	Club
1	GK	Marisol Carratu	15 July 1986 (aged 30)	1.79 m	93	0	(Spain) Atlético Guardés
3	RW	Xoana Iacoi	3 June 1992 (aged 24)	1.62 m	15	27	(Argentina) Cideco Handball
4	RW	Lucía Haro	21 August 1986 (aged 29)	1.79 m	98	204	(Argentina) Unión Eléctrica
5	LW	Manuela Pizzo	13 November 1992 (aged 23)	1.73 m	80	238	(Argentina) Estudiantes
6	LB	Luciana Salvadó	3 April 1990 (aged 26)	1.69 m	97	296	(Argentina) Club Oeste
7	P	Rocio Campigli	6 August 1994 (aged 22)	1.73 m	45	48	(Argentina) Estudiantes
8	LW	Amelia Belotti	17 November 1988 (aged 27)	1.79 m	83	256	(Argentina) Vilo
9	RB	Luciana Mendoza	14 March 1990 (aged 26)	1.70 m	96	382	(Spain) Atlético Guardés
10	CB	Victoria Crivelli	30 September 1990 (aged 25)	1.75 m	85	150	(Argentina) Ferro Carril Oeste
12	GK	Valentina Kogan	19 March 1980 (aged 36)	1.78 m	170	3	(Argentina) Vilo
15	P	Antonela Mena	28 March 1988 (aged 28)	1.82 m	124	380	(Argentina) Cideco Handball
18	CB	Macarena Sans	20 November 1996 (aged 19)	1.64 m	38	73	(Argentina) Vilo
21	LB	Macarena Gandulfo	3 November 1993 (aged 22)	1.76 m	63	149	(Spain) Alcobendas
22	CB	Elke Karsten	15 May 1995 (aged 21)	1.77 m	32	122	(Argentina) Quilmes

Group play

Pos	Team	Pld	W	D	L	GF	GA	GD	Pts	Qualification
1	Russia	5	5	0	0	165	147	+18	10	Quarter-finals
2	France	5	4	0	1	118	93	+25	8	Quarter-finals
3	Sweden	5	2	1	2	150	141	+9	5	Quarter-finals
4	Netherlands	5	1	2	2	135	135	0	4	Quarter-finals
5	South Korea	5	1	1	3	130	136	−6	3	
6	Argentina	5	0	0	5	101	147	−46	0	

Source: IHF
Rules for classification: 1) Points; 2) Head-to-head points; 3) Head-to-head goal difference; 4) Head-to-head goals scored; 5) Goal difference; 6) Goals scored; 7) Draw.

6 August 2016; 21:50	**Sweden**	**31–21**	**Argentina**	Future Arena, Rio de Janeiro; Referees: Coulibaly, Diabaté (CIV)
6 August 2016; 21:50	Hagman 6	(13–9)	Mendoza 5	Future Arena, Rio de Janeiro; Referees: Coulibaly, Diabaté (CIV)
6 August 2016; 21:50	3× (yellow card) 5× (suspension)	Report	1× (yellow card) 6× (suspension)	Future Arena, Rio de Janeiro; Referees: Coulibaly, Diabaté (CIV)

8 August 2016; 19:50	**Argentina**	**18–26**	**Netherlands**	Future Arena, Rio de Janeiro; Referees: Mousaviyan, Kolahdouzan (IRI)
8 August 2016; 19:50	Mendoza 3	(9–13)	Polman 6	Future Arena, Rio de Janeiro; Referees: Mousaviyan, Kolahdouzan (IRI)
8 August 2016; 19:50	3× (yellow card) 5× (suspension)	Report	3× (yellow card) 10× (suspension)	Future Arena, Rio de Janeiro; Referees: Mousaviyan, Kolahdouzan (IRI)

10 August 2016; 21:50	**France**	**27–11**	**Argentina**	Future Arena, Rio de Janeiro; Referees: Alpaidze, Berezkina (RUS)
10 August 2016; 21:50	Houette 8	(15–4)	Campigli 4	Future Arena, Rio de Janeiro; Referees: Alpaidze, Berezkina (RUS)
10 August 2016; 21:50	3× (yellow card) 4× (suspension)	Report	2× (yellow card) 7× (suspension)	Future Arena, Rio de Janeiro; Referees: Alpaidze, Berezkina (RUS)

12 August 2016; 19:50	**Russia**	**35–29**	**Argentina**	Future Arena, Rio de Janeiro; Referees: Mousaviyan, Kolahdouzan (IRI)
12 August 2016; 19:50	Vyakhireva 7	(20–18)	Pizzo 6	Future Arena, Rio de Janeiro; Referees: Mousaviyan, Kolahdouzan (IRI)
12 August 2016; 19:50	3× (yellow card) 11× (suspension) 1× (red card)	Report	4× (yellow card) 7× (suspension)	Future Arena, Rio de Janeiro; Referees: Mousaviyan, Kolahdouzan (IRI)

14 August 2016; 21:50	**Argentina**	**22–28**	**South Korea**	Future Arena, Rio de Janeiro; Referees: Bonaventura, Bonaventura (FRA)
14 August 2016; 21:50	Mendoza 6	(10–12)	Gwon 11	Future Arena, Rio de Janeiro; Referees: Bonaventura, Bonaventura (FRA)
14 August 2016; 21:50	3× (yellow card) 5× (suspension)	Report	3× (yellow card) 2× (suspension)	Future Arena, Rio de Janeiro; Referees: Bonaventura, Bonaventura (FRA)

== Judo ==
Argentina has qualified two judokas for each of the following weight classes at the Games. Remarkably going to her third Olympics, Beijing 2008 bronze medalist Paula Pareto was ranked among the top 14 eligible judokas for women in the IJF World Ranking List of 30 May 2016, while Emmanuel Lucenti at men's half-middleweight (81 kg) earned a continental quota spot from the Pan American region as the highest-ranked Argentine judoka outside of direct qualifying position.

Athlete	Event	Round of 64	Round of 32	Round of 16	Quarterfinals	Semifinals	Repechage	Final / BM	
Athlete	Event	Opposition Result	Opposition Result	Opposition Result	Opposition Result	Opposition Result	Opposition Result	Opposition Result	Rank
Emmanuel Lucenti	Men's −81 kg	Bye	Elias (LIB); **W** 010–000	Valois-Fortier (CAN); **L** 010–010 S	did not advance				
**Paula Pareto**	Women's −48 kg	—N/a	Bye	Dolgova (RUS); **W** 102–000	Csernoviczki (HUN); **W** 010–000	Kondo (JPN); **W** 010–000	Bye	Jeong B-k (KOR); **W** 010–000	1st place, gold medalist(s)

== Modern pentathlon ==
Argentine athletes have qualified for the following spots to compete in modern pentathlon, signifying the nation's Olympic return to the sport for the first time since 1960. Emmanuel Zapata secured a selection in the men's event after obtaining a top finish for South America and one of the five Olympic slots from the Pan American Games. Meanwhile, Zapata's Ukrainian-born wife and London 2012 Olympian Iryna Khokhlova was ranked among the top 10 modern pentathletes, not yet qualified, in their respective events based on the UIPM World Rankings as of 1 June 2016.

Athlete	Event	Fencing (épée one touch)				Swimming (200 m freestyle)			Riding (show jumping)			Combined: shooting/running (10 m air pistol)/(3200 m)			Total points	Final rank
Athlete	Event	RR	BR	Rank	MP points	Time	Rank	MP points	Penalties	Rank	MP points	Time	Rank	MP Points	Total points	Final rank
Emmanuel Zapata	Men's	11–24	0	33	166	2:06.66	29	320	23	22	277	12:03.19	31	577	1340	30
Iryna Khokhlova	Women's	14–21	0	29	184	2:19.77	22	281	42	25	268	13:53.53	34	467	1200	28

== Rowing ==
Argentina has qualified one boat each in the men's and women's single sculls for the Games at the 2015 Latin American Continental Qualification Regatta in Valparaíso, Chile.

Athlete	Event	Heats		Repechage		Quarterfinals		Semifinals		Final	
Athlete	Event	Time	Rank	Time	Rank	Time	Rank	Time	Rank	Time	Rank
Brian Rosso	Men's single sculls	7:22.69	3 **QF**	Bye		7:03.23	4 **SC/D**	7:24.65	2 **FC**	6:58.58	15
Lucia Palermo	Women's single sculls	8:47.01	4 **R**	8:00.59	2 **QF**	7:56.61	6 **SC/D**	8:15.42	3 **FC**	7:50.59	17

Qualification Legend: FA=Final A (medal); FB=Final B (non-medal); FC=Final C (non-medal); FD=Final D (non-medal); FE=Final E (non-medal); FF=Final F (non-medal); SA/B=Semifinals A/B; SC/D=Semifinals C/D; SE/F=Semifinals E/F; QF=Quarterfinals; R=Repechage

== Rugby sevens ==
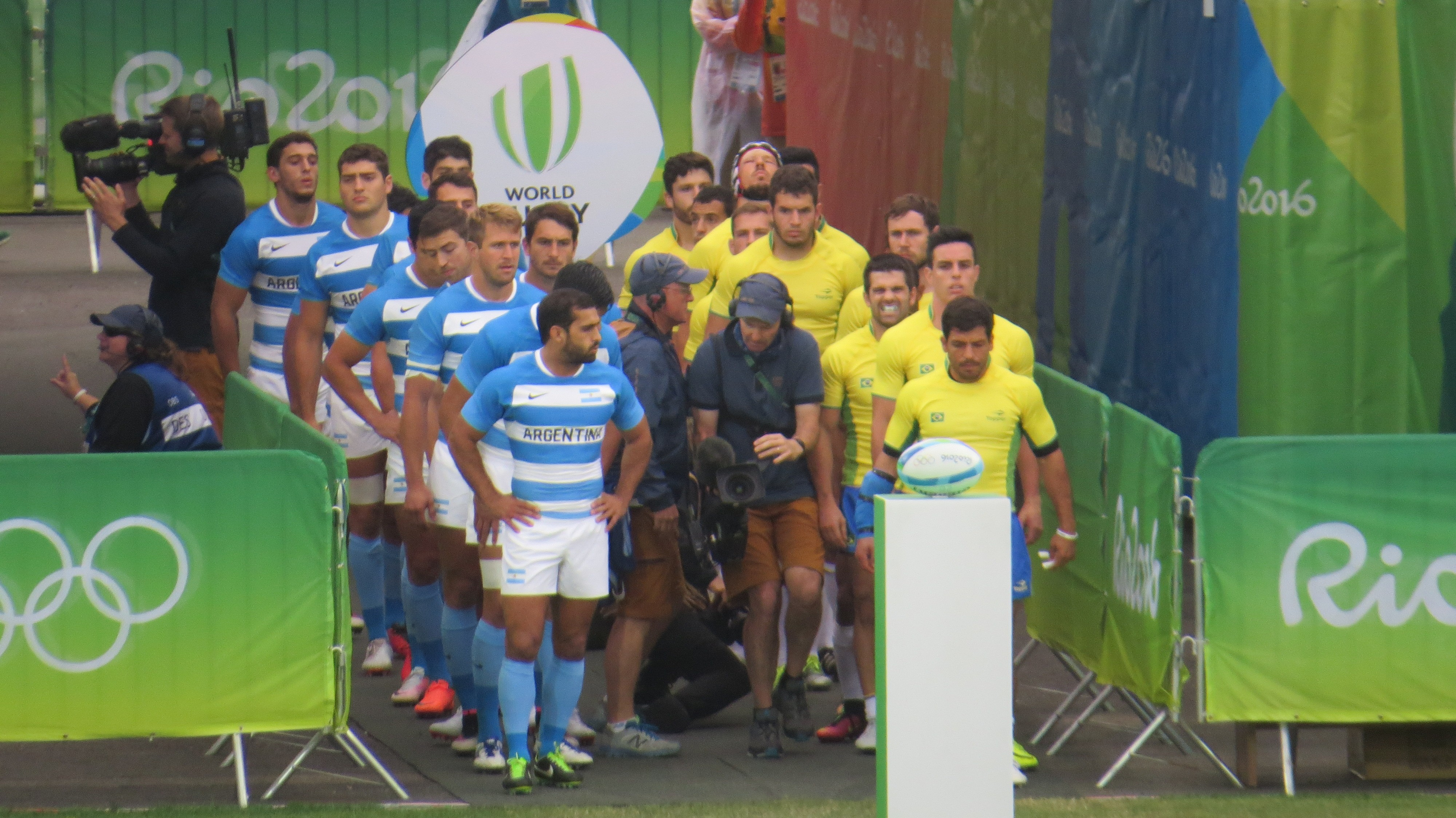
Players of Argentina vs Brazil match

=== Men's tournament ===
Argentina's men's rugby sevens team qualified for the Olympics after sealing triumph at the 2015 CONSUR Sevens in Santa Fe, Argentina.

Team roster

The following is the Argentina roster in the men's rugby sevens tournament of the 2016 Summer Olympics. On 9 August, Bruzzone replaced Etchart and Rojas by injury.

Head coach: Santiago Gómez Cora

No.	Pos.	Player	Date of birth (age)	Events	Points	Union
1	FW	Fernando Luna	12 May 1990 (aged 26)	28	178	(Argentina) Córdoba Athletic
2	FW	Santiago Álvarez	17 February 1994 (aged 22)	22	100	(Argentina) CASI
3	FW	Germán Schulz	5 February 1994 (aged 22)	18	120	(Argentina) Tala
4	FW	Juan Pablo Estelles	5 May 1988 (aged 28)	3	60	(Argentina) Atlético del Rosario
5	FW	Axel Müller	25 November 1993 (aged 22)	21	212	(Argentina) Marista
6	BK	Matías Moroni	29 March 1991 (aged 25)	13	139	(Argentina) CUBA
7	BK	Javier Rojas	15 April 1991 (aged 25)	10	243	(Argentina) Universitario
8	BK	Gastón Revol (c)	26 November 1986 (aged 29)	49	566	(Argentina) La Tablada
9	BK	Rodrigo Etchart	24 January 1994 (aged 22)	19	175	(Argentina) SIC
10	BK	Bautista Ezcurra	16 January 1995 (aged 21)	10	107	(Argentina) Hindú
11	BK	Juan Imhoff	11 May 1988 (aged 28)	2	5	(France) Racing 92
12	BK	Franco Sábato	13 January 1990 (aged 26)	25	205	(Argentina) Alumni
13	BK	Nicolás Bruzzone	24 October 1985 (aged 30)	54	292	(Argentina) Universitario

Group play

Pos	Team	Pld	W	D	L	PF	PA	PD	Pts	Qualification
1	Fiji	3	3	0	0	85	45	+40	**9**	Quarter-finals
2	Argentina	3	2	0	1	62	35	+27	**7**	Quarter-finals
3	United States	3	1	0	2	59	41	+18	**5**	
4	Brazil	3	0	0	3	12	97	−85	**3**	

Source: World Rugby
Rules for classification: 1) Points; 2) Head-to-head result; 3) Point difference; 4) Points scored.

9 August 2016
13:00

**United States**	**14–17**	**Argentina**
Try: Penalty try 11' c Barrett 12' c Con: Hughes (2/2)	Report (Rio 2016); Report (World Rugby)	Try: Müller 4' c Luna 8' m Moroni 14' m Con: Revol (1/3)

Deodoro Stadium, Rio de Janeiro
Referee: Craig Joubert (South Africa)

9 August 2016
18:30

**Fiji**	**21–14**	**Argentina**
Try: Tuisova 2' c Taliga (2) 11' c, 12' c Con: Ravouvou (1/1); Kolinisau (2/2)	Report (Rio 2016); Report (World Rugby)	Try: Sábato 5' c Álvarez 8' c Con: Revol (2/2)

Deodoro Stadium, Rio de Janeiro
Referee: Rasta Rasivhenge (South Africa)

10 August 2016
13:00

**Argentina**	**31–0**	**Brazil**
Try: Müller 4' m Revol 6' c Álvarez 7' c Schulz 11' c Bruzzone 13' m Con: Revol (3/5)	Report (Rio 2016); Report (World Rugby)

Deodoro Stadium, Rio de Janeiro
Referee: Mike Adamson (Great Britain)

Quarterfinal

10 August 2016
18:00

**Great Britain**	**5–0 (a.e.t.)**	**Argentina**
Try: Bibby 18'; Pen: Mitchell (0/1)	Report (Rio 2016); Report (World Rugby)	Pen: Revol (0/1)

Deodoro Stadium, Rio de Janeiro
Referee: Alexandre Ruiz (France)

Classification semifinal (5–8)

11 August 2016
14:00

**Argentina**	**26–21**	**Australia**
Try: Revol (2) 7' m, 10' c Moroni (2) 11' c, 14' c Con: Revol (3/4)	Report (Rio 2016); Report (World Rugby)	Try: Cusack (2) 1' c, 2' c Foley 6' c Con: Stannard (3/3)

Deodoro Stadium, Rio de Janeiro
Referee: Marius van der Westhuizen (South Africa)

Fifth place game

11 August 2016
18:00

**New Zealand**	**17–14**	**Argentina**
Try: A. Ioane 5' m Mikkelson 9' m R. Ioane 11' c Con: Pulu (0/2); Kaka (1/1)	Report (Rio 2016); Report (World Rugby)	Try: Imhoff 13' c Moroni 14' c Con: Revol (2/2)

Deodoro Stadium, Rio de Janeiro
Referee: Craig Joubert (South Africa)

== Sailing ==
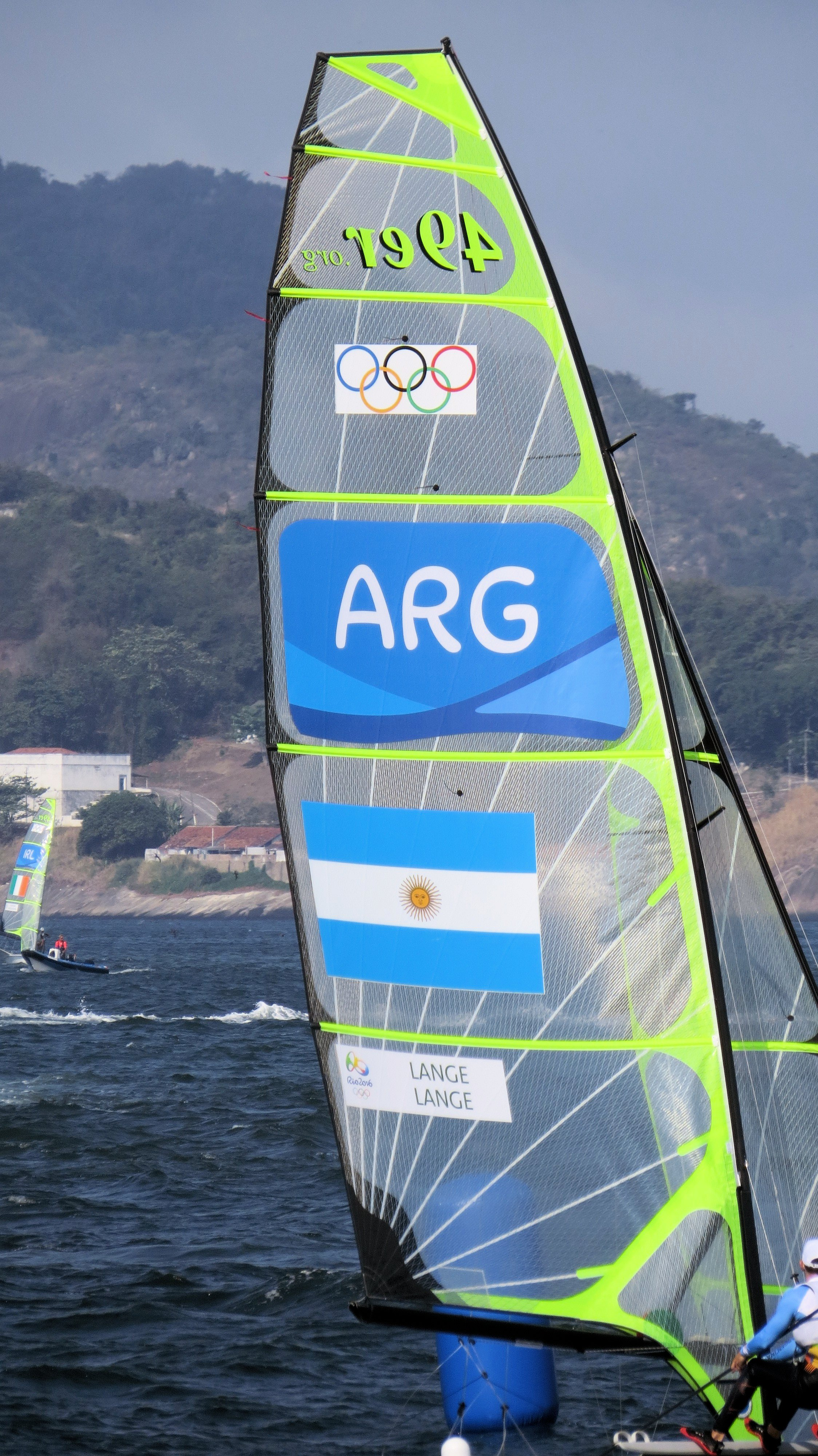
Lange brothers sailboat

Argentine sailors have qualified one boat in each of the following classes through the 2014 ISAF Sailing World Championships, the individual fleet Worlds, and South American qualifying regattas.

The entire Argentine sailing squad for the Olympics was named on 1 April 2016, including London 2012 bronze medal duo Lucas Calabrese and Juan de la Fuente, and three-time medalist Santiago Lange, who eventually joined his sons and skiff crew Yago and Klaus Lange to confirm his sixth Olympic appearance.

Men

Athlete	Event	Race													Net points	Final rank
Athlete	Event	1	2	3	4	5	6	7	8	9	10	11	12	M*	Net points	Final rank
Bautista Saubidet Birkner	RS:X	20	16	19	17	12	23	14	25	24	18	~~29~~	22	EL	210	21
Julio Alsogaray	Laser	4	2	14	1	24	~~47~~	12	16	14	20	—N/a		22	129	10
Facundo Olezza	Finn	1	9	19	18	16	~~21~~	10	6	1	7	—N/a		14	101	9
Lucas Calabrese; Juan de la Fuente	470	~~17~~	14	11	11	17	12	15	17	5	27	—N/a		EL	129	16
Klaus Lange; Yago Lange	49er	11	7	6	16	12	16	~~21~~	2	2	11	3	11	14	111	7

Women

Athlete	Event	Race													Net points	Final rank
Athlete	Event	1	2	3	4	5	6	7	8	9	10	11	12	M*	Net points	Final rank
María Celia Tejerina	RS:X	21	12	16	17	21	19	16	16	24	~~27~~	23	21	EL	206	21
Lucía Falasca	Laser Radial	7	11	19	15	20	22	1	15	3	~~25~~	—N/a		EL	113	11
María Sol Branz; Victoria Travascio	49erFX	14	~~20~~	13	9	19	12	7	11	10	4	11	19	EL	129	13

Mixed

Athlete	Event	Race													Net points	Final rank
Athlete	Event	1	2	3	4	5	6	7	8	9	10	11	12	M*	Net points	Final rank
**Santiago Lange**; **Cecilia Carranza Saroli**	Nacra 17	11	2	13	2	12	6	1	6	9	~~21~~	2	1	6	77	1st place, gold medalist(s)

M = Medal race; EL = Eliminated – did not advance into the medal race

== Shooting ==
Argentine shooters have achieved quota places for the following events by virtue of their best finishes at the 2015 Pan American Games and the 2015 ISSF World Cup series, as long as they obtained a minimum qualifying score (MQS) by 31 March 2016. Five of them had been selected for the Olympic team at the end of the qualifying period, with rifle shooter Amelia Fournel aiming to appear at her third Olympics after a 16-year hiatus.

Athlete	Event	Qualification		Semifinal		Final	
Athlete	Event	Points	Rank	Points	Rank	Points	Rank
Fernando Borello	Men's trap	105	31	did not advance			
Federico Gil	Men's skeet	116	27	did not advance			
Amelia Fournel	Women's 10 m air rifle	410.6	41	—N/a		did not advance	
Amelia Fournel	Women's 50 m rifle 3 positions	571	31	—N/a		did not advance	
Melisa Gil	Women's skeet	69	8	did not advance			
Fernanda Russo	Women's 10 m air rifle	414.4	20	—N/a		did not advance	

Qualification Legend: Q = Qualify for the next round; q = Qualify for the bronze medal (shotgun)

== Swimming ==
Argentine swimmers have so far achieved qualifying standards in the following events (up to a maximum of 2 swimmers in each event at the Olympic Qualifying Time (OQT), and potentially 1 at the Olympic Selection Time (OST)):

Athlete	Event	Heat		Semifinal		Final	
Athlete	Event	Time	Rank	Time	Rank	Time	Rank
Federico Grabich	Men's 50 m freestyle	22.44	31	did not advance			
Federico Grabich	Men's 100 m freestyle	48.78	22	did not advance			
Federico Grabich	Men's 200 m freestyle	1:47.41	22	did not advance			
Santiago Grassi	Men's 100 m butterfly	52.56	24	did not advance			
Martín Naidich	Men's 400 m freestyle	3:54.58	39	—N/a		did not advance	
Martín Naidich	Men's 1500 m freestyle	15:39.93	43	—N/a		did not advance	
Virginia Bardach	Women's 200 m butterfly	2:13.58	26	did not advance			
Virginia Bardach	Women's 200 m individual medley	2:17.94	37	did not advance			
Virginia Bardach	Women's 400 m individual medley	4:49.69	31	—N/a		did not advance	
Julia Sebastián	Women's 200 m breaststroke	2:27.98	21	did not advance			

== Synchronized swimming ==
Argentina has fielded a squad of two synchronized swimmers to compete only in the women's duet by picking up one of four spare berths freed by the continental selection for being the next highest ranking nation at the FINA Olympic test event in Rio de Janeiro.

Athlete	Event	Free routine (preliminary)		Technical routine			Free routine (final)		
Athlete	Event	Points	Rank	Points	Total (technical + free)	Rank	Points	Total (technical + free)	Rank
Etel Sánchez; Sofía Sánchez	Duet	79.8333	19	79.4829	159.3162	19	did not advance		

== Tennis ==
Argentina has entered six tennis players into the Olympic tournament. London 2012 bronze medalist Juan Martín del Potro (world no. 223), Federico Delbonis (world no. 35), Guido Pella (world no. 50), and Juan Mónaco (world no. 94) qualified directly for the men's singles, as four of the top 56 eligible players in the ATP World Rankings as of 6 June 2016.

Having been directly entered to the singles, del Potro and Delbonis also opted to play with their partners Guillermo Durán and Máximo González, respectively, in the men's doubles.

Athlete	Event	Round of 64	Round of 32	Round of 16	Quarterfinals	Semifinals	Final / BM	
Athlete	Event	Opposition Result	Opposition Result	Opposition Result	Opposition Result	Opposition Result	Opposition Result	Rank
**Juan Martín del Potro**	Men's singles	Djokovic (SRB); **W** 7–6^{(7–4)}, 7–6^{(7–2)}	Sousa (POR); **W** 6–3, 1–6, 6–3	Daniel (JPN); **W** 6–7^{(4–7)}, 6–1, 6–2	Bautista Agut (ESP); **W** 7–5, 7–6^{(7–4)}	Nadal (ESP); **W** 5–7, 6–4, 7–6^{(7–5)}	Murray (GBR); **L** 5–7, 6–4, 2–6, 5–7	2nd place, silver medalist(s)
Federico Delbonis	Men's singles	Nadal (ESP); **L** 2–6, 1–6	did not advance					
Juan Mónaco	Men's singles	Bašić (BIH); **W** 6–2, 6–2	Murray (GBR); **L** 3–6, 1–6	did not advance				
Guido Pella	Men's singles	Kohlschreiber (GER); **L** 6–4, 1–6, 2–6	did not advance					
Federico Delbonis; Guillermo Durán	Men's doubles	—N/a	Mergea / Tecău (ROU); **L** 3–6, 2–6	did not advance				
Juan Martín del Potro; Máximo González	Men's doubles	—N/a	Guccione / Peers (AUS); **W** 6–4, 7–5	López / Nadal (ESP); **L** 3–6, 7–5, 2–6	did not advance			

== Triathlon ==
Argentina has qualified two triathletes for the following events at the Olympics. Luciano Taccone and London 2012 Olympian Gonzalo Tellechea were ranked among the top 40 eligible triathletes in the men's event based on the ITU Olympic Qualification List as of 15 May 2016.

Athlete	Event	Swim (1.5 km)	Trans 1	Bike (40 km)	Trans 2	Run (10 km)	Total Time	Rank
Luciano Taccone	Men's	19:23	0:55	59:56	0:41	34:35	1:55:30	48
Gonzalo Tellechea	Men's	18:42	0:49	59:08	0:41	34:23	1:53:43	45

== Volleyball ==
=== Beach ===
Argentina's women's beach volleyball team qualified directly for the Olympics by virtue of their nation's top 15 placement in the FIVB Olympic Rankings as of 13 June 2016. The place was awarded to London 2012 Olympian Ana Gallay and her rookie partner Georgina Klug.

Athlete	Event	Preliminary round	Standing	Round of 16	Quarterfinals	Semifinals	Final / BM	
Athlete	Event	Opposition Score	Standing	Opposition Score	Opposition Score	Opposition Score	Opposition Score	Rank
Ana Gallay; Georgina Klug	Women's	Pool B Baquerizo – Fernández (ESP); **L** 0 – 2 (11–21, 19–21); Bednarczuk – Seixas (BRA); **L** 0 – 2 (11–21, 17–21); Hermannová – Sluková (CZE); **L** 1 – 2 (21–13, 19–21, 8–15)	4	Did Not Advance				

=== Indoor ===
==== Men's tournament ====
Argentina's men's volleyball team qualified for the Olympics by virtue of a top finish and gaining an outright berth at the South American Continental Qualifier in Maiquetía, Venezuela.

Team roster

The following is the Argentina roster in the men's volleyball tournament of the 2016 Summer Olympics.

Head coach: Julio Velasco

No.	Name	Date of birth	Height	Weight	Spike	Block	2015–16 club
1	Nicolás Bruno	24 February 1989	1.87 m (6 ft 2 in)	85 kg (187 lb)	338 cm (133 in)	318 cm (125 in)	(Argentina) Personal Bolívar
4	Martín Ramos	26 August 1991	1.97 m (6 ft 6 in)	94 kg (207 lb)	348 cm (137 in)	328 cm (129 in)	(Argentina) UPCN San Juan
6	Cristian Poglajen	14 July 1989	1.95 m (6 ft 5 in)	94 kg (207 lb)	342 cm (135 in)	322 cm (127 in)	(Brazil) Montes Claros Vôlei
7	Facundo Conte	25 August 1989	1.97 m (6 ft 6 in)	88 kg (194 lb)	354 cm (139 in)	344 cm (135 in)	(Poland) PGE Skra Bełchatów
8	Demián González	21 February 1983	1.92 m (6 ft 4 in)	82 kg (181 lb)	350 cm (140 in)	333 cm (131 in)	(Brazil) Brasil Kirin Campinas
10	José Luis González	27 December 1984	2.06 m (6 ft 9 in)	97 kg (214 lb)	322 cm (127 in)	302 cm (119 in)	(Poland) BBTS Bielsko-Biała
11	Sebastian Solé	12 June 1991	2.00 m (6 ft 7 in)	94 kg (207 lb)	362 cm (143 in)	342 cm (135 in)	(Italy) Diatec Trentino
12	Bruno Lima	4 February 1996	1.98 m (6 ft 6 in)	87 kg (192 lb)	345 cm (136 in)	320 cm (130 in)	(Argentina) Obras Vóley
13	Ezequiel Palacios	2 October 1992	1.98 m (6 ft 6 in)	95 kg (209 lb)	345 cm (136 in)	325 cm (128 in)	(Argentina) Club La Unión
14	Pablo Crer	12 June 1989	2.02 m (6 ft 8 in)	85 kg (187 lb)	357 cm (141 in)	337 cm (133 in)	(Argentina) Personal Bolívar
15	Luciano De Cecco (c)	2 June 1988	1.91 m (6 ft 3 in)	98 kg (216 lb)	332 cm (131 in)	315 cm (124 in)	(Italy) Sir Safety Conad Perugia
16	Alexis González (L)	21 July 1981	1.84 m (6 ft 0 in)	85 kg (187 lb)	327 cm (129 in)	310 cm (120 in)	(Argentina) Personal Bolívar

Group play

Pos	Team	Pld	W	L	Pts	SW	SL	SR	SPW	SPL	SPR	Qualification
1	Argentina	5	4	1	12	12	4	3.000	394	335	1.176	Quarterfinals
2	Poland	5	4	1	12	14	5	2.800	447	389	1.149	Quarterfinals
3	Russia	5	4	1	11	13	6	2.167	432	367	1.177	Quarterfinals
4	Iran	5	2	3	7	8	9	0.889	389	392	0.992	Quarterfinals
5	Egypt	5	1	4	3	3	12	0.250	286	362	0.790	
6	Cuba	5	0	5	0	1	15	0.067	300	403	0.744	

Source: FIVB
Rules for classification: Tiebreakers

7 August 2016; 22:35	**Argentina**	**3–0**	Iran	Ginásio do Maracanãzinho, Rio de Janeiro; Attendance: 6,460; Referees: Fabrizio Pasquali (ITA), Liu Jiang (CHN)
7 August 2016; 22:35	(25–23, 26–24, 25–18); Results Statistics			Ginásio do Maracanãzinho, Rio de Janeiro; Attendance: 6,460; Referees: Fabrizio Pasquali (ITA), Liu Jiang (CHN)

9 August 2016; 09:30	Russia	**1–3**	**Argentina**	Ginásio do Maracanãzinho, Rio de Janeiro; Attendance: 7,165; Referees: Arturo di Giacomo (BEL), Heike Kraft (GER)
9 August 2016; 09:30	(18–25, 25–18, 18–25, 21–25); Results Statistics			Ginásio do Maracanãzinho, Rio de Janeiro; Attendance: 7,165; Referees: Arturo di Giacomo (BEL), Heike Kraft (GER)

11 August 2016; 15:00	**Poland**	**3–0**	Argentina	Ginásio do Maracanãzinho, Rio de Janeiro; Attendance: 6,972; Referees: Denny Cespedes (DOM), Rogerio Espicalsky (BRA)
11 August 2016; 15:00	(25–21, 25–19, 37–35); Results Statistics			Ginásio do Maracanãzinho, Rio de Janeiro; Attendance: 6,972; Referees: Denny Cespedes (DOM), Rogerio Espicalsky (BRA)

13 August 2016; 11:35	**Argentina**	**3–0**	Cuba	Ginásio do Maracanãzinho, Rio de Janeiro; Attendance: 7,428; Referees: Paulo Turci (BRA), Vladimir Simonović (SRB)
13 August 2016; 11:35	(25–16, 25–14, 25–16); Results Statistics			Ginásio do Maracanãzinho, Rio de Janeiro; Attendance: 7,428; Referees: Paulo Turci (BRA), Vladimir Simonović (SRB)

15 August 2016; 09:30	**Argentina**	**3–0**	Egypt	Ginásio do Maracanãzinho, Rio de Janeiro; Attendance: 8,175; Referees: Luis Macias (MEX), Arturo Di Giacomo (BEL)
15 August 2016; 09:30	(25–16, 25–19, 25–20); Results Statistics			Ginásio do Maracanãzinho, Rio de Janeiro; Attendance: 8,175; Referees: Luis Macias (MEX), Arturo Di Giacomo (BEL)

Quarterfinal

17 August 2016; 22:15	**Brazil**	**3–1**	Argentina	Ginásio do Maracanãzinho, Rio de Janeiro; Attendance: 9,498; Referees: Vladimir Simonović (SRB), Piotr Dudek (POL)
17 August 2016; 22:15	(25–22, 17–25, 25–19, 25–23); Results Statistics			Ginásio do Maracanãzinho, Rio de Janeiro; Attendance: 9,498; Referees: Vladimir Simonović (SRB), Piotr Dudek (POL)

==== Women's tournament ====
Argentina's women's volleyball team qualified for the Olympics by virtue of a top finish and gaining an outright berth at the South American Continental Qualifier in Bariloche, Argentina.

Team roster

The following is the Argentine roster in the women's volleyball tournament of the 2016 Summer Olympics.

Head coach: Guillermo Orduna

No.	Name	Date of birth	Height	Weight	Spike	Block	2015–16 club
2	Tanya Acosta	11 March 1991	1.82 m (6 ft 0 in)	70 kg (150 lb)	287 cm (113 in)	280 cm (110 in)	(Argentina) Gimnasia y Esgrima (LP)
3	Yamila Nizetich (c)	27 January 1989	1.81 m (5 ft 11 in)	74 kg (163 lb)	305 cm (120 in)	295 cm (116 in)	(Turkey) Nilufer
5	Lucía Fresco	14 May 1991	1.95 m (6 ft 5 in)	92 kg (203 lb)	304 cm (120 in)	290 cm (110 in)	(Italy) Robur Tiboni Urbino Volley
9	Clarisa Sagardía	29 June 1989	1.74 m (5 ft 9 in)	67 kg (148 lb)	290 cm (110 in)	280 cm (110 in)	(Argentina) Boca Juniors
10	Emilce Sosa	11 September 1987	1.77 m (5 ft 10 in)	75 kg (165 lb)	305 cm (120 in)	295 cm (116 in)	(Brazil) Esporte Clube Pinheiros
11	Julieta Lazcano	25 July 1989	1.90 m (6 ft 3 in)	74 kg (163 lb)	312 cm (123 in)	293 cm (115 in)	(France) Istres Volley-Ball
12	Tatiana Rizzo (L)	30 December 1986	1.78 m (5 ft 10 in)	64 kg (141 lb)	280 cm (110 in)	268 cm (106 in)	(Argentina) Boca Juniors
13	Leticia Boscacci	8 November 1985	1.86 m (6 ft 1 in)	70 kg (150 lb)	302 cm (119 in)	284 cm (112 in)	(Switzerland) VC Kanti Schaffhausen
14	Josefina Fernández	17 August 1991	1.75 m (5 ft 9 in)	72 kg (159 lb)	294 cm (116 in)	284 cm (112 in)	(Switzerland) Hotel VFM
16	Florencia Busquets	27 June 1989	1.92 m (6 ft 4 in)	68 kg (150 lb)	305 cm (120 in)	290 cm (110 in)	(Switzerland) Hotel VFM
18	Yael Castiglione	27 September 1985	1.84 m (6 ft 0 in)	75 kg (165 lb)	295 cm (116 in)	281 cm (111 in)	(Brazil) Rio do Sul
19	Morena Franchi	19 February 1993	1.64 m (5 ft 5 in)	62 kg (137 lb)	285 cm (112 in)	264 cm (104 in)	(Argentina) Vélez Sarsfield

Group play

Pos	Team	Pld	W	L	Pts	SW	SL	SR	SPW	SPL	SPR	Qualification
1	Brazil (H)	5	5	0	15	15	0	MAX	377	272	1.386	Quarter-finals
2	Russia	5	4	1	12	12	4	3.000	393	323	1.217	Quarter-finals
3	South Korea	5	3	2	9	10	7	1.429	384	372	1.032	Quarter-finals
4	Japan	5	2	3	6	7	9	0.778	347	364	0.953	Quarter-finals
5	Argentina	5	1	4	2	3	14	0.214	319	407	0.784	
6	Cameroon	5	0	5	1	2	15	0.133	328	410	0.800	

Source: FIVB
Rules for classification: Tiebreakers
(H) Host

6 August 2016; 20:30	**Russia**	**3–0**	Argentina	Ginásio do Maracanãzinho, Rio de Janeiro; Attendance: 5,437; Referees: Ibrahim Al-Naama (QAT), Luis Macias (MEX)
6 August 2016; 20:30	(25–13, 25–10, 25–16); Result Statistics			Ginásio do Maracanãzinho, Rio de Janeiro; Attendance: 5,437; Referees: Ibrahim Al-Naama (QAT), Luis Macias (MEX)

8 August 2016; 22:35	**Brazil**	**3–0**	Argentina	Ginásio do Maracanãzinho, Rio de Janeiro; Attendance: 7,651; Referees: Nasr Shaaban (EGY), Fabrizio Pasquali (ITA)
8 August 2016; 22:35	(25–16, 25–19, 25–11); Result Statistics			Ginásio do Maracanãzinho, Rio de Janeiro; Attendance: 7,651; Referees: Nasr Shaaban (EGY), Fabrizio Pasquali (ITA)

10 August 2016; 20:30	**South Korea**	**3–0**	Argentina	Ginásio do Maracanãzinho, Rio de Janeiro; Attendance: 7,248; Referees: Patricia Rolf (USA), Taoufik Boudaya (TUN)
10 August 2016; 20:30	(25–18, 25–20, 25–23); Result Statistics			Ginásio do Maracanãzinho, Rio de Janeiro; Attendance: 7,248; Referees: Patricia Rolf (USA), Taoufik Boudaya (TUN)

12 August 2016; 11:35	**Argentina**	**3–2**	Cameroon	Ginásio do Maracanãzinho, Rio de Janeiro; Attendance: 5,345; Referees: Taoufik Boudaya (TUN), Arturo di Giacomo (BEL)
12 August 2016; 11:35	(19–25, 25–19, 26–28, 25–21, 15–13); Result Statistics			Ginásio do Maracanãzinho, Rio de Janeiro; Attendance: 5,345; Referees: Taoufik Boudaya (TUN), Arturo di Giacomo (BEL)

14 August 2016; 20:30	**Japan**	**3–0**	Argentina	Ginásio do Maracanãzinho, Rio de Janeiro; Attendance: 5,939; Referees: Denny Cespedes (DOM), Fabrizio Pasquali (ITA)
14 August 2016; 20:30	(25–23, 25–16, 26–24); Result Statistics			Ginásio do Maracanãzinho, Rio de Janeiro; Attendance: 5,939; Referees: Denny Cespedes (DOM), Fabrizio Pasquali (ITA)

== Weightlifting ==
Argentina has received an unused quota place from IWF to send a female weightlifter to the Olympics.

Athlete	Event	Snatch		Clean & Jerk		Total	Rank
Athlete	Event	Result	Rank	Result	Rank	Total	Rank
Joana Palacios	Women's −63 kg	83	12	107	11	190	11

== Wrestling ==
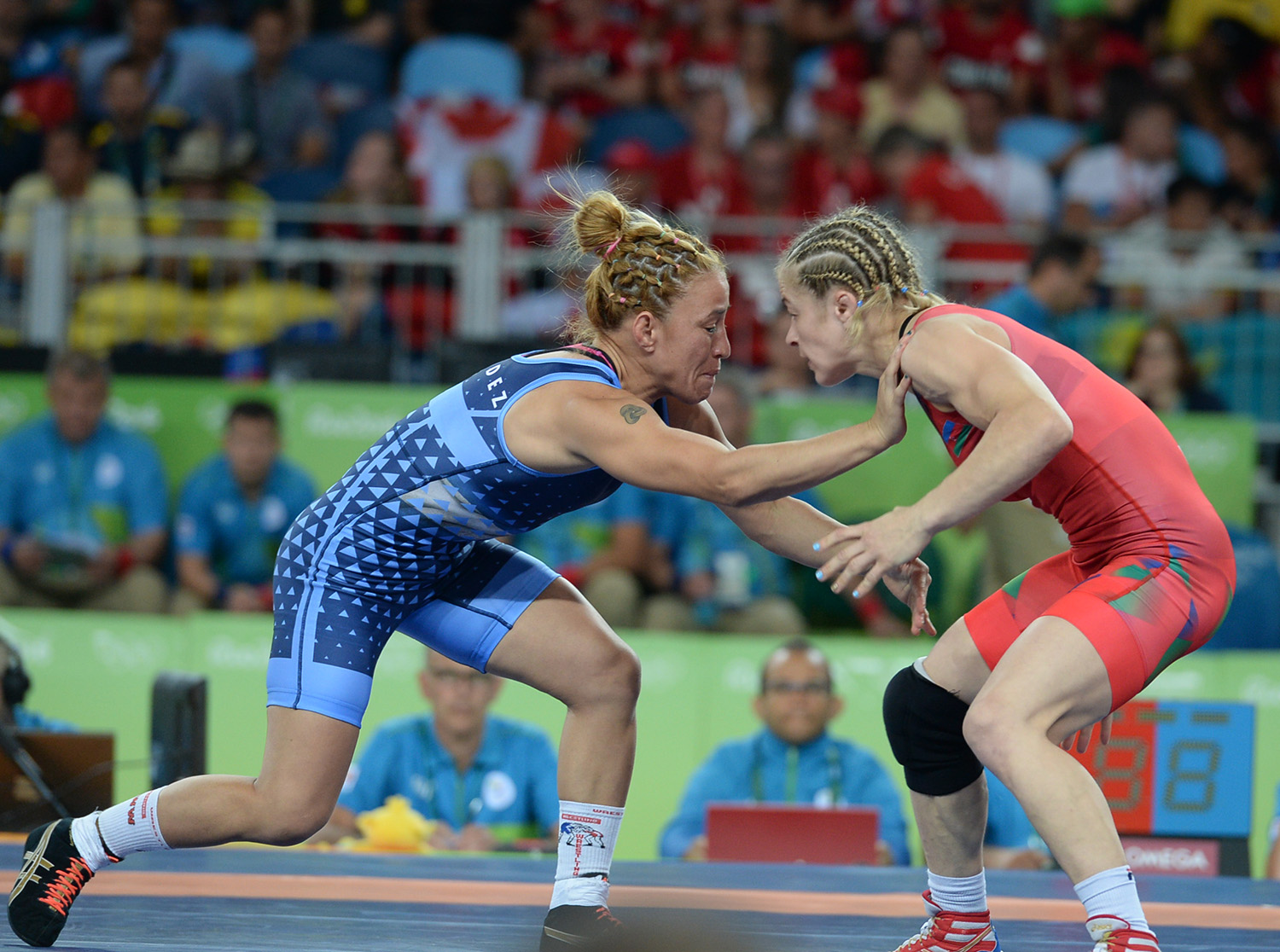
Stadnik vs Bermúdez

Argentina has qualified one wrestler for the women's freestyle 48 kg into the Olympic competition, as a result of her semifinal triumph at the 2016 Pan American Qualification Tournament.

Key:
- VT – Victory by Fall.
- PP – Decision by Points – the loser with technical points.
- PO – Decision by Points – the loser without technical points.
- ST – Technical superiority – the loser without technical points and a margin of victory of at least 8 (Greco-Roman) or 10 (freestyle) points.

Women's freestyle

Athlete	Event	Round of 32	Round of 16	Quarterfinal	Semifinal	Repechage 1	Repechage 2	Final / BM	
Athlete	Event	Opposition Result	Opposition Result	Opposition Result	Opposition Result	Opposition Result	Opposition Result	Opposition Result	Rank
Patricia Bermúdez	−48 kg	Bye	Stadnik (AZE); **L** 0–4 ^{ST}	did not advance		Bye	Matkowska (POL); **W** 3–1 ^{PP}	Yankova (BUL); **L** 1–3 ^{PP}	5

== See also ==
- Argentina at the 2015 Pan American Games
- Argentina at the 2016 Winter Youth Olympics
- Argentina at the 2016 Summer Paralympics
