= Nico Hernandez =

American boxer (born 1996)

Nico Hernández
Personal information
- Nationality: American
- Born: January 4, 1996 (age 30) Wichita, Kansas, U.S.
- Height: 5 ft 5 in (165 cm)
- Weight: Flyweight

Boxing career

Boxing record
- Total fights: 12
- Wins: 12
- Win by KO: 5
- Losses: 0
Medal record
Men's amateur boxing
Representing United States
Summer Olympics
Bronze medal – third place	2016 Rio De Janeiro	Light Flyweight

Nico Hernández (born January 4, 1996) is an American boxer, from Wichita, Kansas. He is an Olympic medalist and pro boxer, noted for unusually fast and aggressive boxing.

He competed at the 2016 Summer Olympics in Rio de Janeiro, Brazil, where he won an Olympic bronze medal for the United States, in the Men's light flyweight division—the United States' first Olympic men's boxing medal since the 2008 Beijing Olympics—capping a 94-5 amateur career (94 wins, 5 losses) with, over six years, six national titles.

Hernandez began his professional boxing career in 2017, starting with back-to-back knockouts in nationally televised bouts.

== Early athletic experiences ==
Hernandez's career was chiefly built on his relationship with two colleagues: his father, and his best friend. He was first introduced to boxing at age 9, by his father, Lewis, a truck driver in Wichita, Kansas, who later became Hernandez's coach. The boy took a liking to boxing with his first encounter, then became an energetic young fighter, winning his first 25 fights, and aggressively reaching for tougher, even older and bigger, opponents.

Along with best friend Tony Losey, a troubled teen also coached (and rehabilitated) by Lewis—the two boys developed into competitive boxers, with aspirations of winning 2016 Olympic gold medals together (Losey rising to USA Boxing's 3rd-place ranking among welterweights, and younger Hernandez winning gold at the National Junior Olympics in 2011 and 2012). They remained intensely involved with boxing, together, supporting each other's careers, until 2014, when Losey died in an industrial accident.

At Wichita North High School, Hernandez also excelled in wrestling, eagerly taking on better and bigger opponents with a ferocity and endurance that shocked them, and his coach.

Young Hernandez' amateur boxing career—with only 4 losses in over 90 fights—included, by age 21, eight wins in the Ringside World Championship (an annual Kansas City-area event billed as "the largest amateur boxing tournament in the world"), along with six consecutive Silver Gloves National Championship wins, and a 2014 National Golden Gloves gold medal.

== 2016 Olympic qualifications ==
Hernandez entered Boxing Qualification for the 2016 Summer Olympics. Despite two failed attempts to qualify for the U.S. Olympic Team, he persisted, qualifying in March 2016. At the 2016 American Boxing Olympic Qualification Tournament held in Buenos Aires, Argentina, he won the silver medal in the men's flyweight. He defeated Argentina's Leandro Blanc in the semifinals to secure his place in the Olympic competition and advanced to the final to face Yuberjen Martinez of Colombia.

== 2016 Rio Olympics ==
Entering Boxing at the 2016 Summer Olympics, 20-year-old Hernandez—a virtual unknown in boxing—weighed in at 108 pounds, entering the Men's light flyweight division. Not expected to win, his unexpected Olympic victories created a stir in the boxing community. His USA Olympic boxing coach was Billy Walsh (though his lifelong boxing coach had been his own father, Lewis Hernandez). Ironically, Walsh had previously coached Brendan Irvine, an Irish boxer who, the year before, had defeated Hernandez in the starting round of a world championship fight in Qatar.

For the first time since 1980, protective headgear would not be worn by Olympic boxers during their matches. This would become a problem for Hernandez in his final fight.

=== First fight ===
Though not expected to beat Manuel Cappai of Italy, and starting off slowly in the first round—losing on two judges' scorecards—Hernandez found his strength in the second and third round, overwhelming Cappai, and winning.

=== Second fight ===
In his second fight, low-seeded Hernandez faced Russia's Vasili Egorov, second-seeded, and silver medalist of the last world championship—the defending European champion. Though again starting off slowly, Hernandez surprised his opponent, in the second and third rounds, with fast aggression, moving in close and overpowering Egorov and winning a surprise upset by unanimous decision of the judges.

=== Third fight ===
In his third fight, this one for the Olympic bronze medal, Hernandez faced Carlos Quipo Pilataxi of Ecuador. Again starting slowly, he came from behind to win, again—ensuring himself an Olympic medal, and startling the boxing world—becoming the first American male boxer to win an Olympic medal since heavyweight boxer Deontay Wilder's 2008 bronze medal win—and the first light flyweight American male boxer to win an Olympic medal since Michael Carbajal (a future International Boxing Hall of Fame inductee) won a silver medal at the 1988 Seoul Olympics.

=== Fourth and final fight ===
In his fourth fight—the semi-finals, for the Olympic silver medal—Hernandez fought the Asian champion, Hasanboy Dusmatov of Uzbekistan. Hernandez again started slowly, but this time could not make the come-from-behind win. One reporter suggested he had trouble figuring out Dusmatov's odd, left-handed style. The smaller and quicker Dusmatov was the aggressive leader in the first round. An accidental head-butt gashed Hernandez, leading to a bloody face and briefly blurred vision; a doctor cleaned him up between rounds 2 and 3, but he did not rebound fully. In the third and final round, the referee interrupted the fight to have a doctor attend the cut. For the rest of the fight, Dusmatov mostly avoided Hernandez, backing away and keeping out of his way. Hernández, by his own admission, "waited too long" for things to change. Though two judges' scorecards gave the third round to Hernandez, Dusmatov won the match.

After applauding his opponent's victory, Hernandez admitted fighting "his fight instead of my own," adding, "I let him come in and make the fight too wild and that's how I lost." With scores of 30–27, 30-27 and 29-28 (USA Today reported "29-28, 29-28 and 30-27 for Dusmatov"), the judges unanimously credited the win to Dusmatov. Though Hernandez lost the fight on points, he kept an Olympic bronze medal.

Despite defeating Hernández for the Olympic silver medal, Dusmatov (who ultimately won the gold medal) described the match as his own most difficult fight of the Olympics, up to that point, describing Hernández as a "champion" who is "really, really strong."

== Hometown impact and response ==
Hernandez was Wichita's first Olympic medalist since the 1984 team gold medal wins of women's basketball star Lynette Woodard and men's volleyball athlete Marc Waldie. He was the first Wichitan to win an individual Olympic medal since runner Jim Ryun won silver in the 1968 Mexico City Olympics.

On his return to Wichita, Hernandez was celebrated with an official city reception party at the local airport, a parade through his neighborhood, and a celebration at his alma mater, Wichita High School North. He was awarded a four-year scholarship to Wichita State University, which he expressed plans to use.

Hernandez also reportedly "really connects" with local kids and speaks often at local schools.

== Pro career ==
Shortly after his Olympic victory, USA Today reported that Hernandez planned to turn to professional boxing after the 2016 Olympics. His father, Lewis, resumed his role as his head trainer and coach.

Hoping to replicate the hometown pro success of Omaha, Nebraska boxer Terence Crawford, a unified junior welterweight champion, Hernandez initially sought to start with an undercard fight at a December 10, 2016 Crawford match in Omaha in a one-time event sponsored by promoter Top Rank. However, the deal fell through.

Instead, like Crawford, Hernandez began his pro boxing career in and around his hometown, starting in the Wichita area as a featured fighter for the new matches of the "Knockout Night Boxing" (KO Night Boxing, LLC) organization. His first two fights in 2017, at age 21—before thousands of fans at local arenas, and nationally televised by the CBS Sports Network—both ended in knockout victories for Hernandez.

=== First pro fight ===
Hernandez's first professional fight, on March 25, 2017 (in front of 3,100 fans at the Kansas Star Arena of the Kansas Star Casino, near Wichita, and televised nationally by CBS Sports Network), was against Las Vegas novice pro Patrick Gutierrez, a junior bantamweight fighter who had lost his two previous pro matches, and passed up a third "easy fight" to instead challenge Olympic medalist Hernandez, hoping that defeating him would gain him quick elevation to national prominence.

This was the first fight in which Hernandez had ever been scheduled for six rounds, and one of the few experiences he had ever had fighting without protective headgear (which had proven a problem for him at the 2016 Olympics).

Through four rounds, Hernandez exerted full control, attacking aggressively and rapidly. He introduced a surprise move, which he'd never used before: body-punching shots "going up the middle." He also switched briefly to left-handed blows. The fight ended in a technical knockout (TKO) of Gutierrez. Gutierrez, who had fought in heavier divisions, said he'd never before had his "bell rung like that" in any fight.

=== Second pro fight ===
Hernandez's second pro fight, on June 17, 2017, in front of 2,000 boxing fans just outside Wichita at Hartman Arena in Park City, was initially broadcast nationally on CBS Sports Network (until a storm knocked out communications).

His challenger was Mexico native Jose Rodriguez, 29, a novice flyweight boxer of Markesan, Wisconsin, with a 2-0 pro record (having knocked out his two winless previous challengers). Rodriguez was trained by Angel Manfredy, himself a successful lightweight boxer (43–8–1, 32 KOs) and four-time world title challenger, who'd fought Floyd Mayweather Jr., Diego Corrales and Stevie Johnston.

Rodriguez's pre-match public remarks—claiming Hernandez wouldn't go the distance, and promising to knock him out—reportedly infuriated Hernandez, who committed to "take him out." In the following match, Hernandez did exactly that, quickly, maintaining control of the furious fight with multiple downings of his opponent, ending in a third-round knockout. Ernie Haines, Rodriguez's trainer, summarized, "We ran into a hurricane tonight." Describing Hernandez as "the first person of this caliber" they'd ever encountered, Haines said, "He barbequed us."

CBS Sports Network's color commentator for the fight, Sean Wheelock, said the bout demonstrated that Hernandez, in a fight, "is a phenomenal power puncher," recalling his previous fight showing "he just rips the body." Wheelock summarized the two bouts as showing "an evolution in Nico," projecting it would be "a rapid evolution," with potential power at fighting weights up to 135 pounds.

== Professional boxing record ==
12 fights	12 wins	0 losses
By knockout	5	0
By decision	7	0

No.	Result	Record	Opponent	Type	Round, time	Date	Location	Notes
10	Win	12-0	(United States) Robert Ledesma	TKO	2 (6), 1:12	Jun 27, 2025	(United States) Charles Koch Arena, Wichita, Kansas, U.S.	
10	Win	11-0	(Nicaragua) Ernesto Irias	UD	8	Jun 16, 2023	(United States) The Heal Complex, Augusta, Georgia, U.S.	
10	Win	10-0	(United States) Gilberto Mendoza	UD	8	Feb 24, 2023	(United States) Rio Rancho Events Center, Rio Rancho, New Mexico, U.S.	
9	Win	9–0	(South Korea) Jae Young Kim	UD	8	Dec 11, 2022	Kintex Hall, Goyang, South Korea	
8	Win	8–0	(United States) Delvin McKinley	UD	6	Jul 29, 2022	(United States) Charles Koch Arena, Wichita, Kansas, U.S.	
7	Win	7–0	(Mexico) Victor Trejo Garcia	UD	8	Feb 15, 2019	(United States) Kansas Star Arena, Mulvane, Kansas, USA	
6	Win	6–0	(United States) Josue Morales	UD	8	Nov 18, 2018	(United States) Kansas Star Arena, Mulvane, Kansas, USA	
5	Win	5–0	(Hungary) Szilveszter Kanalas	KO	1 (12), 2:52	May 19, 2018	(United States) Kansas Star Arena, Mulvane, Kansas, USA	Won vacant IBA flyweight title
4	Win	4–0	(United States) Victor Torres	TKO	5 (8), 0:55	Feb 10, 2018	(United States) Hartman Arena, Park City, Kansas, USA	
3	Win	3–0	(United States) Kendrick Latchman	UD	6	Sep 23, 2017	(United States) Hartman Arena, Park City, Kansas, USA	
2	Win	2–0	(United States) Jose Rodriguez	KO	3 (6), 2:38	Jun 17, 2017	(United States) Hartman Arena, Park City, Kansas, USA	
1	Win	1–0	(United States) Patrick Gutierrez	TKO	4 (6), 2:35	Mar 25, 2017	(United States) Kansas Star Arena, Mulvane, Kansas, USA	Professional Debut

== Bare knuckle record ==
Professional record breakdown
1 match	1 win	0 losses
By knockout	1	0
By decision	0	0
Draws	0	

Res.	Record	Opponent	Method	Event	Date	Round	Time	Location	Notes
Win	1–0	Chancy Wilson	TKO (referee stoppage)	BKFC 13	October 10, 2020	4	2:00	Salina, Kansas, United States	
