= Luis Hernández (boxer) =

Ecuadorian boxer

Personal information
- Nationality: Ecuadorian
- Born: 2 June 1973 (age 51)

Sport
- Sport: Boxing

Luis Hernández (born 2 June 1973) is an Ecuadorian boxer. He competed in the men's welterweight event at the 1996 Summer Olympics.
