= Ignacio Perrín =

Argentine boxer

Personal information
- Born: 20 January 1985 (age 41) San Fernando, Argentina
- Height: 1.65 m (5 ft 5 in)
- Weight: Featherweight

Boxing career
- Stance: Orthodox

Boxing record
- Total fights: 13
- Wins: 7
- Win by KO: 1
- Losses: 5
- Draws: 1

Ignacio Perrín (born 20 January 1985) is an Argentine professional boxer. As an amateur, Perrín competed in the men's lightweight event at the 2016 Summer Olympics.
