= Alberto Palmetta =

Argentine boxer

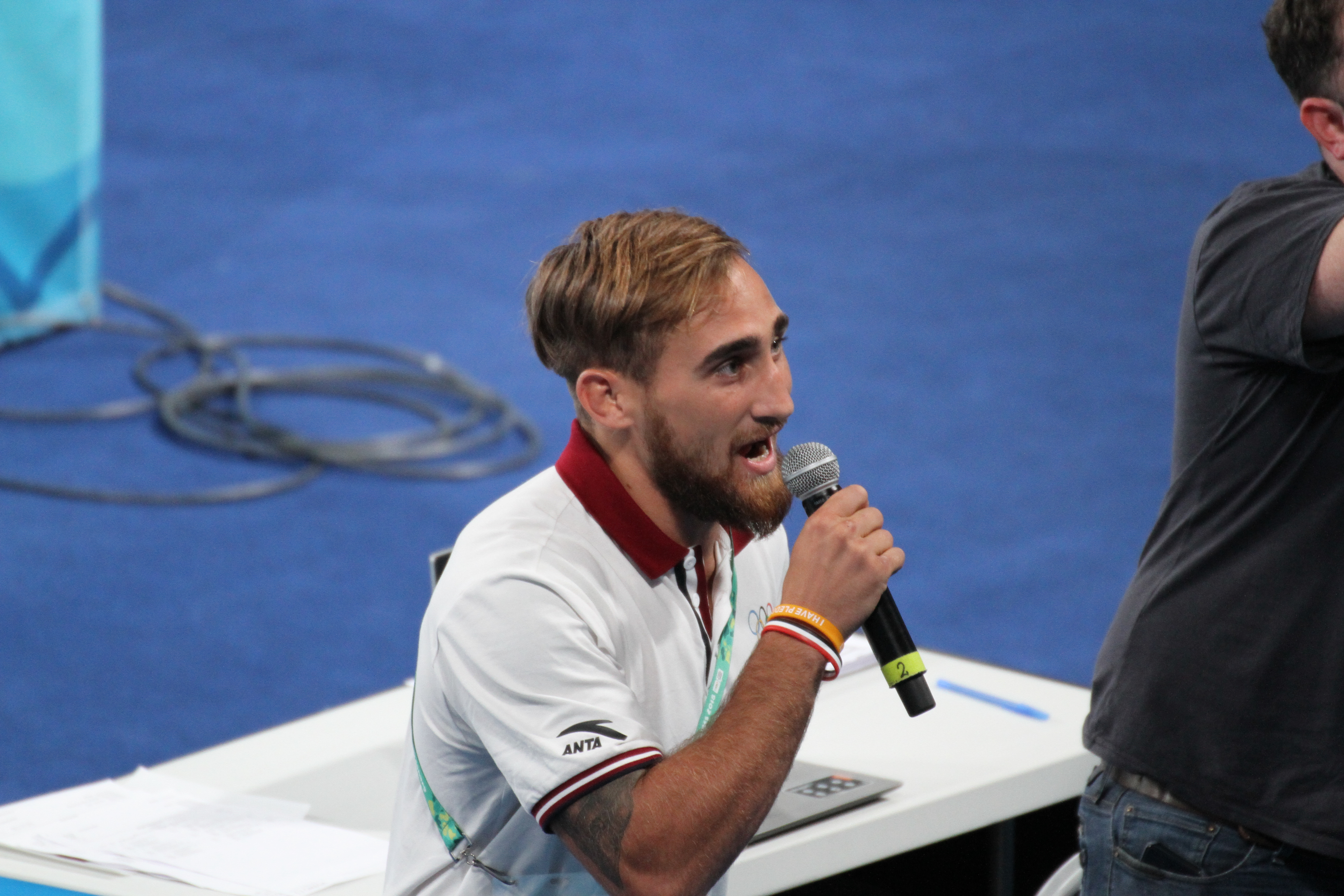
- Palmetta at the 2018 Summer Youth Olympics

Personal information
- Nationality: Argentine
- Born: 5 April 1990 (age 36)
- Height: 5’7
- Weight: welterweight

Boxing career
- Stance: southpaw

Boxing record
- Total fights: 22
- Wins: 19
- Win by KO: 13
- Losses: 3

Alberto Palmetta (born 5 April 1990) is an Argentine boxer. He competed in the men's welterweight event at the 2016 Summer Olympics.

== Professional boxing record ==
19 wins (13 knockouts), 3 losses
Res.	Record	Opponent	Type	Rd., Time	Date	Location	Notes
Loss	19-3	(Mexico) Jesus Saracho	SD	10 (10)	2024-07-31	(United States) ProBox Events Center, Plant City, Florida, USA	For WBA Continental America Welterweight Title
Win	19–2	(United States) Janelson Figueroa Bocachica	UD	10 (10)	2023-11-01	(United States) Whitesands Events Center, Plant City, USA	
Loss	18–2	(United States) Jamal James	UD	10 (10)	2023-02-25	(United States) Armory, Minneapolis, USA	
Win	18–1	(Dominican Republic) Thomas Mendez	TKO	3 (10)	2022-11-10	Coco Locos Restaurant Sports Bar, Sosua, Dominican Republic	
Win	17–1	(Colombia) Yeis Gabriel Solano	SD	8 (8)	2021-10-30	(United States) Mandalay Bay Resort & Casino, Las Vegas, USA	
Win	16–1	(Mexico) Jose Herrera Garcia	KO	2 (10) 3:00	2021-03-27	Club Atletico Lanus, Lanus, Argentina	
Win	15–1	(Mexico) Saul Corral	TKO	5 (10) 2:09	2020-11-07	(United States) Sports Event Center, Rock Hill, USA	
Win	14–1	(United States) Tre'Sean Wiggins	TKO	6 (10) 1:24	2020-08-15	(United States) Ocean Center, Daytona Beach, USA	
Win	13–1	(Mexico) Erik Vega Ortiz	TKO	10 (10) 1:03	2019-11-15	(United States) WinnaVegas Casino & Resort, Sloan, USA	
Win	12–1	(United States) Jeremy Bryan	TKO	4 (8) 1:45	2019-08-17	(United States) CenterStage@NoDa, Charlotte, USA	
Win	11–1	(United States) Marklin Bailey	TKO	5 (6) 2:43	2019-02-23	(United States) CenterStage@NoDa, Charlotte, USA	
Win	10–1	(Dominican Republic) David Martinez	RTD	3 (9) 3:00	2018-12-14	Casa de los Clubes, Santo Domingo, Dominican Republic	
Win	9–1	(Puerto Rico) Javier Garcia	TKO	2 (6) 2:59	2018-10-06	(United States) Coliseum, Saint Petersburg, USA	
Win	8–1	(United States) Najik Lewis	KO	2 (6) 2:47	2018-08-16	(United States) Durham Armory, Durham, USA	
Win	7–1	(Argentina) Jorge Fernando Navarro	KO	2 (8) 2:45	2018-03-17	Club Social y Deportivo Comercio, Villa Dolores, Argentina	
Loss	6–1	(Argentina) Gonzalo Gaston Coria	KO	5 (6) 0:40	2017-11-24	Centro de Convenciones, Punta del Este, Uruguay	
Win	6–0	(Argentina) Guillermo de Jesus Paz	UD	6 (6)	2017-09-09	Salon Tattersall, San Isidro, Argentina	
Win	5–0	(Argentina) Oscar Alberto Paz	RTD	3 (6), 1:53	2017-08-11	Sociedad General Belgrano, Córdoba, Córdoba, Argentina	
Win	4–0	(Argentina) Octavio Ezequiel Segundo	UD	6 (6)	2017-05-13	Centro de Convenciones, Punta del Este, Uruguay	
Win	3–0	(Mexico) Luis Montelongo	SD	6 (6)	2017-04-01	Arena Jalisco, Guadalajara, Jalisco, Mexico	
Win	2–0	(Argentina) Nicolas Luques Palacios	UD	6 (6)	2017-01-07	Estadio Parque Central, Neuquen, Neuquen, Argentina	
Win	1–0	(Argentina) Alfredo Gaston Benavidez	TKO	3 (4), 2:57	2016-11-18	Polideportivo Fray Mamerto Esquiú, Catamarca, Catamarca, Argentina	
