= Leandro Blanc =

Argentine boxer (born 1993)

Leandro Jose Blanc
Personal information
- Nickname: Musculito
- Born: 2 May 1993 (age 33) Concordia, Argentina
- Height: 1.56 m (5 ft 1 1/2 in)
- Weight: Light flyweight

Boxing career
- Stance: Southpaw

Boxing record
- Total fights: 8
- Wins: 8
- Win by KO: 3
- Losses: 1
Medal record
Men's amateur boxing
Representing Argentina
South American Games
Silver medal – second place	2018 Cochabamba	Light flyweight

Leandro Blanc (born 2 May 1993) is an Argentine professional boxer who has held the South American light flyweight title since February 2020. As an amateur, he represented his country in the men's light flyweight event at the 2016 Summer Olympics.

== Boxing career ==
Blanc made his professional debut against Miguel Angel Maciel on 7 September 2019 in Lanús, Argentina. He won the fight by a fourth-round technical knockout. After winning his second professional bout against Mauro Ezequiel Quinteros by technical knockout as well, Blanc was scheduled to face Mauro Sapito Liendro for the vacant Argentina (FAB) light flyweight title on 7 February 2020. The bout was later cancelled for undisclosed reasons and Blanc was rescheduled to face Ramón Velásquez for the vacant South American light flyweight title a day later. He won his first professional title by a fifth-round technical knockout.

Blanc faced Juan Santiago Prado in a stay-busy fight on 6 March 2021. He beat his journeyman opponent by unanimous decision. Black next made his first South American title defense against Junior Leandro Zarate on 25 September 2021, at the Complejo Termal Vertiente de la Concordia in his native Concordia. As well as being a South American title defense, the vacant WBA Fedelatin and Argentina (FAB) light flyweight titles were on the line as well. Blanc won his first career step-up bout by technical decision, with scores of 105–104, 107–102 and 105–104. The fight was stopped in the eleventh round, due to a cut on Blanc caused by an accidental clash of heads.

Blanc faced German Valenzuela Barreras for the WBA Fedelatin light flyweight title on 24 June 2022, on the undercard of the "KO Drugs" event. He won the fight by split decision. Two of the judges scored the fight 96–93 for Blanc, while the third judge scored the bout 98–93 for Barreras. Blanc next faced Mauro Nicolas Liendro for the vacant South American light flyweight title on 22 October 2022. He captured the belt by unanimous decision, with all three judges scoring the bout 96–94 in his favor.

Blanc faced Kervin Romero for the vacant WBA Fedelatin light flyweight title on 3 June 2023, at the Club Atletico Huracan in Buenos Aires, Argentina. He won the fight by unanimous decision, with two scorecards of 97–92 and one scorecard of 99–90. Blanc would suffer both his first loss and his first stoppage loss in his next fight however, as Sixto Perez stopped him in the second round of their vacant WBA Fedebol light flyweight title clash on December 9, 2023.

== Professional boxing record ==
9 fights	8 wins	1 loss
By knockout	3	1
By decision	5	0

No.	Result	Record	Opponent	Type	Round, time	Date	Location	Notes
9	Loss	8–1	Sixto Perez	KO	2 (10), 0:25	9 Dec 2023	Enjoy Punta del Este Casino, Punta del Este, Uruguay	For vacant WBA Fedebol light flyweight title
8	Win	8–0	Kervin Romero	UD	10	3 Jun 2023	Club Atletico Huracan, Buenos Aires, Argentina	Won vacant WBA Fedelatin light flyweight title
7	Win	7–0	Mauro Nicolas Liendro	UD	10	22 Oct 2022	Club Comunicaciones, Buenos Aires, Argentina	Won vacant South American light flyweight title
6	Win	6–0	German Valenzuela Barreras	SD	10	24 Jun 2022	Casino Buenos Aires, Buenos Aires, Argentina	Retained WBA Fedelatin light flyweight title
5	Win	5–0	Junior Leandro Zarate	TD	11 (12)	25 Sep 2021	Complejo Termal Vertiente de la Concordia, Concordia, Argentina	Won vacant WBA Fedelatin and Argentina (FAB) light flyweight titles Retained South American light flyweight title
4	Win	4–0	Juan Santiago Prado	UD	6	6 Mar 2021	Complejo Termal Vertiente de la Concordia, Concordia, Argentina	
3	Win	3–0	Ramón Velásquez	TKO	5 (12)	8 Feb 2020	Club Ferro Carril, Concordia, Argentina	Won vacant South American light flyweight title
2	Win	2–0	Mauro Ezequiel Quinteros	TKO	3 (6)	15 Nov 2019	Club Ferro Carril, Concordia, Argentina	
1	Win	1–0	Miguel Angel Maciel	TKO	4 (4)	7 Sep 2019	Club Atlético Lanús, Lanús, Argentina	
