= 2013 AIBA World Boxing Championships – Heavyweight =

Boxing competitions

The Heavyweight competition at the 2013 AIBA World Boxing Championships was held from 14–26 October 2013. Boxers were limited to a weight of 91 kilograms.

== Medalists ==
Gold	Clemente Russo (ITA)
Silver	Evgeny Tishchenko (RUS)
Bronze	Teymur Mammadov (AZE)
Bronze	Yamil Peralta (ARG)

== Seeds ==
1. (Azerbaijan) Teymur Mammadov (semifinals)
2. (Argentina) Yamil Peralta (semifinals)
3. (Belarus) Siarhei Karneyeu (second round)
4. (Italy) Clemente Russo (champion)
5. (China) Wang Xuanxuan (second round)
6. (Kazakhstan) Anton Pinchuk (third round)
7. (Germany) Emir Ahmatovic (third round)
8. (Cuba) Erislandy Savón (quarterfinals)
9. (Algeria) Chouaib Bouloudinat (third round)
10. (Canada) Samir El-Mais (second round)

== Draw ==
=== Finals ===
Semifinals
1	(Azerbaijan) Teymur Mammadov	0
4	(Italy) Clemente Russo	3
3	(Russia) Evgeny Tishchenko	2
2	(Argentina) Yamil Peralta	1

Final
(Italy) Clemente Russo	3
(Russia) Evgeny Tishchenko	0

=== Top half ===
==== Section 1 ====
First Round
(Nigeria) Efetobor Apochi	2
(Turkey) Seyda Keser	1
(Sweden) Gabriel Richards	2
(Slovakia) Sandro Dirnfeld	1
(Greece) Fotios Arapoglou	DQ
(South Korea) Heo Jin-Ho

Second Round
(Azerbaijan) Teymur Mammadov	3
(Nigeria) Efetobor Apochi	0
(India) Manpreet Singh	3
(Seychelles) Keddy Agnes	0
(Algeria) Chouaib Bouloudinat	3
(Sweden) Gabriel Richards	0
(South Korea) Heo Jin-Ho
(Cuba) Erislandy Savón	TKO

Third Round
(Azerbaijan) Teymur Mammadov	3
(India) Manpreet Singh	0
(Algeria) Chouaib Bouloudinat	0
(Cuba) Erislandy Savón	3

Quarterfinals
(Azerbaijan) Teymur Mammadov	2
(Cuba) Erislandy Savón	1

==== Section 2 ====
First Round
(Croatia) Marko Čalić	3
(Australia) Jason Whateley	0
(Chile) Miguel Veliz	3
(Scotland) Stephen Lavelle	0
(Kenya) Daniel Shisia	0
(Denmark) Jim Andreasen	3
(Tajikistan) Jakhon Qurbonov	0
(Georgia (country)) Levan Guledani	3

Second Round
(China) Wang Xuanxuan	0
(Croatia) Marko Čalić	3
(Chile) Miguel Veliz	3
(Saint Lucia) Ryan Charles	0
(Kyrgyzstan) Sergei Parenko	0
(Denmark) Jim Andreasen	3
(Georgia (country)) Levan Guledani	0
(Italy) Clemente Russo	3

Third Round
(Croatia) Marko Čalić	3
(Chile) Miguel Veliz	0
(Denmark) Jim Andreasen	0
(Italy) Clemente Russo	3

Quarterfinals
(Croatia) Marko Čalić	0
(Italy) Clemente Russo	3

=== Bottom half ===
==== Section 3 ====
First Round
(Russia) Evgeny Tishchenko	3
(England) Warren Baister	0
(Brazil) Juan Nogueira	2
(Estonia) Ainar Karlson	1
(Uzbekistan) Rustam Tulaganov	3
(New Zealand) David Light	0
(Hungary) Imre Szellő	3
(Morocco) Abdeljalil Abouhamada	0

Second Round
(Belarus) Siarhei Karneyeu	0
(Russia) Evgeny Tishchenko	3
(Brazil) Juan Nogueira	3
(United States) Michael Hilton	0
(Moldova) Vladimir Cheles	0
(Uzbekistan) Rustam Tulaganov	3
(Hungary) Imre Szellő	0
(Kazakhstan) Anton Pinchuk	3

Third Round
(Russia) Evgeny Tishchenko	3
(Brazil) Juan Nogueira	0
(Uzbekistan) Rustam Tulaganov	2
(Kazakhstan) Anton Pinchuk	1

Quarterfinals
(Russia) Evgeny Tishchenko	3
(Uzbekistan) Rustam Tulaganov	0

==== Section 4 ====
First Round
(American Samoa) Robert Toilolo	0
(Montenegro) Marko Radonjić	3
(Bulgaria) Nikolay Mutavski	0
(Republic of Ireland) Thomas McCarthy	3
(Lithuania) Tadas Tamašauskas	3
(Finland) Tomi Honka	0
(Latvia) Raitis Sinkevics	3
(Angola) Tumba Silva	0

Second Round
(Germany) Emir Ahmatovic	TKO
(Montenegro) Marko Radonjić
(Republic of Ireland) Thomas McCarthy	2
(Canada) Samir El-Mais	0
(Norway) Kai Havnaa	0
(Lithuania) Tadas Tamašauskas	3
(Latvia) Raitis Sinkevics	0
(Argentina) Yamil Peralta	3

Third Round
(Germany) Emir Ahmatovic	0
(Republic of Ireland) Thomas McCarthy	3
(Lithuania) Tadas Tamašauskas	0
(Argentina) Yamil Peralta	3

Quarterfinals
(Republic of Ireland) Thomas McCarthy	1
(Argentina) Yamil Peralta	2
