= Boxing at the 2012 Summer Olympics =

Coordinates: 51.5075°N 0.0297°E

Boxing at the Games of the XXX Olympiad
- Venue: ExCeL Exhibition Centre
- Dates: 28 July – 12 August 2012
- No. of events: 13
- Competitors: 286 (250 men, 36 women)

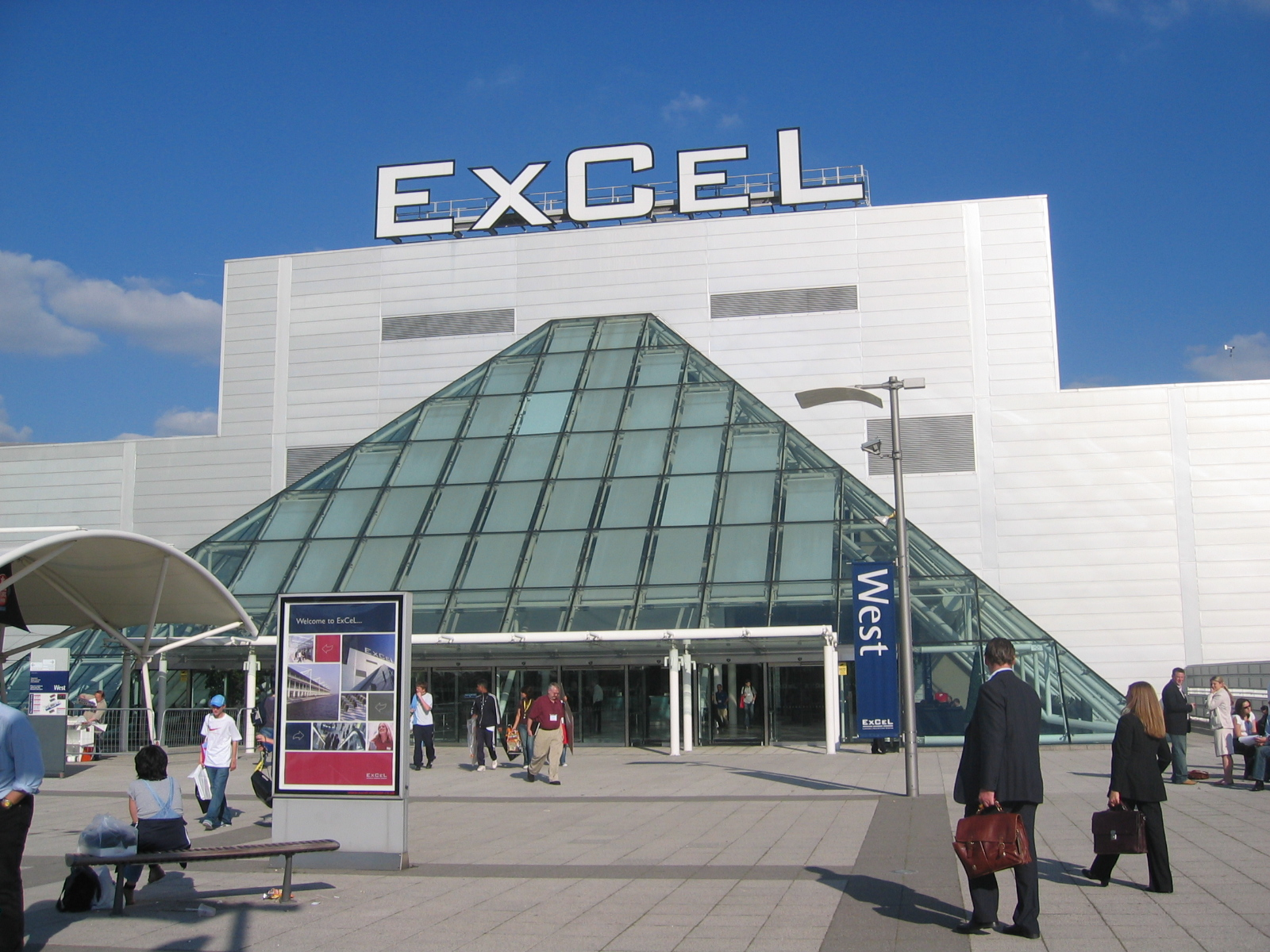
ExCeL Exhibition Centre, the venue for the boxing at the 2012 Olympic Games.

The boxing tournaments at the 2012 Olympic Games in London were held from 28 July to 12 August at the ExCeL Exhibition Centre.

A total of 286 competitors took part in 13 events. For the first time at an Olympic Games, women competed in three boxing events. The first Olympic gold medal in women's boxing was awarded to Nicola Adams from Great Britain, who won the flyweight tournament on 9 August 2012.

== Competition format ==
Men competed in the following ten events:

- Light flyweight (49kg)
- Flyweight (52kg)
- Bantamweight (56kg)
- Lightweight (60kg)
- Light welterweight (64kg)
- Welterweight (69kg)
- Middleweight (75kg)
- Light heavyweight (81kg)
- Heavyweight (91kg)
- Super heavyweight (+91kg)

Women's boxing was included in the Olympic programme for the first time, with female boxers able to participate in three events:

- Flyweight (51kg)
- Lightweight (60kg)
- Middleweight (75kg)

== Qualifying criteria ==
Each National Olympic Committee was permitted to enter up to one athlete in each event. Nine places were reserved for the host nation, Great Britain, from which it chose up to six (five male and one female), while the remaining places were allocated to the Tripartite Invitation Commission. For each athlete from the host nation who qualified through the World Amateur Boxing Championships, the host lost a guaranteed place. Each continent had a quota of places to be filled through the two championships. Asia had 56 spots, the Americas 54, Africa 52, Europe 78 and Oceania 10.

Qualification events were:

- 2011 World Amateur Boxing Championships – Baku, Azerbaijan, 16 September – 1 October, in which 10 athletes for all categories, six athletes for the heavyweight and super heavyweight categories, qualified for the Olympics.
- 2012 AIBA Women's World Boxing Championships – Qinhuangdao, China, 9–22 May 2012
- Continental Olympic qualifying events during 2012

== Competition schedule ==
There were two sessions of competition on most days of the 2012 Olympics Boxing program, an afternoon session (A), starting at 13:30 BST (except for 9 August when it started at 16:30 BST), and an evening session (E), starting at 20:30 BST.

P	Preliminary rounds	R	Round of 16	¼	Quarterfinals	½	Semifinals	F	Final

Date →	Sat 28		Sun 29		Mon 30		Tue 31		Wed 1		Thu 2		Fri 3		Sat 4		Sun 5		Mon 6		Tue 7		Wed 8		Thu 9		Fri 10		Sat 11	Sun 12
Event ↓	A	E	A	E	A	E	A	E	A	E	A	E	A	E	A	E	A	E	A	E	A	E	A	E	A	E	A	E	E	A
Men's light flyweight							P								R									¼			½		F	
Men's flyweight					P								R									¼						½		F
Men's bantamweight	P								R									¼									½		F	
Men's lightweight			P								R									¼								½		F
Men's light welterweight							P								R									¼			½		F	
Men's welterweight			P										R									¼						½		F
Men's middleweight	P										R									¼							½		F	
Men's light heavyweight					P										R									¼				½		F
Men's heavyweight									R									¼									½		F	
Men's super heavyweight									R											¼								½		F
Women's flyweight																	R		¼				½		F					
Women's lightweight																	R		¼				½		F					
Women's middleweight																	R		¼				½		F					

== Medalists ==
=== Men ===
Games	Gold	Silver	Bronze
Light flyweight	Zou Shiming; China	Kaeo Pongprayoon; Thailand	Paddy Barnes; Ireland
Light flyweight	Zou Shiming; China	Kaeo Pongprayoon; Thailand	David Ayrapetyan; Russia
Flyweight	Robeisy Ramírez; Cuba	Tugstsogt Nyambayar; Mongolia	Misha Aloyan; Russia
Flyweight	Robeisy Ramírez; Cuba	Tugstsogt Nyambayar; Mongolia	Michael Conlan; Ireland
Bantamweight	Luke Campbell; Great Britain	John Joe Nevin; Ireland	Lázaro Álvarez; Cuba
Bantamweight	Luke Campbell; Great Britain	John Joe Nevin; Ireland	Satoshi Shimizu; Japan
Lightweight	Vasyl Lomachenko; Ukraine	Han Soon-chul; South Korea	Yasniel Toledo; Cuba
Lightweight	Vasyl Lomachenko; Ukraine	Han Soon-chul; South Korea	Evaldas Petrauskas; Lithuania
Light welterweight	Roniel Iglesias; Cuba	Denys Berinchyk; Ukraine	Vincenzo Mangiacapre; Italy
Light welterweight	Roniel Iglesias; Cuba	Denys Berinchyk; Ukraine	Uranchimegiin Mönkh-Erdene; Mongolia
Welterweight	Serik Sapiyev; Kazakhstan	Fred Evans; Great Britain	Taras Shelestyuk; Ukraine
Welterweight	Serik Sapiyev; Kazakhstan	Fred Evans; Great Britain	Andrey Zamkovoy; Russia
Middleweight	Ryōta Murata; Japan	Esquiva Falcão; Brazil	Anthony Ogogo; Great Britain
Middleweight	Ryōta Murata; Japan	Esquiva Falcão; Brazil	Abbos Atoev; Uzbekistan
Light heavyweight	Egor Mekhontsev; Russia	Adilbek Niyazymbetov; Kazakhstan	Yamaguchi Falcão; Brazil
Light heavyweight	Egor Mekhontsev; Russia	Adilbek Niyazymbetov; Kazakhstan	Oleksandr Gvozdyk; Ukraine
Heavyweight	Oleksandr Usyk; Ukraine	Clemente Russo; Italy	Tervel Pulev; Bulgaria
Heavyweight	Oleksandr Usyk; Ukraine	Clemente Russo; Italy	Teymur Mammadov; Azerbaijan
Super heavyweight	Anthony Joshua; Great Britain	Roberto Cammarelle; Italy	Magomedrasul Majidov; Azerbaijan
Super heavyweight	Anthony Joshua; Great Britain	Roberto Cammarelle; Italy	Ivan Dychko; Kazakhstan

=== Women ===
Games	Gold	Silver	Bronze
Flyweight	Nicola Adams; Great Britain	Ren Cancan; China	Marlen Esparza; United States
Flyweight	Nicola Adams; Great Britain	Ren Cancan; China	Mary Kom; India
Lightweight	Katie Taylor; Ireland	Sofya Ochigava; Russia	Mavzuna Chorieva; Tajikistan
Lightweight	Katie Taylor; Ireland	Sofya Ochigava; Russia	Adriana Araujo; Brazil
Middleweight	Claressa Shields; United States	Nadezda Torlopova; Russia	Marina Volnova; Kazakhstan
Middleweight	Claressa Shields; United States	Nadezda Torlopova; Russia	Li Jinzi; China

== Medal summary ==
=== Medal table ===
Rank	Nation	Gold	Silver	Bronze	Total
1	Great Britain	3	1	1	5
2	Ukraine	2	1	2	5
3	Cuba	2	0	2	4
4	Russia	1	2	3	6
5	Ireland	1	1	2	4
5	Kazakhstan	1	1	2	4
7	China	1	1	1	3
8	Japan	1	0	1	2
8	United States	1	0	1	2
10	Italy	0	2	1	3
11	Brazil	0	1	2	3
12	Mongolia	0	1	1	2
13	South Korea	0	1	0	1
13	Thailand	0	1	0	1
15	Azerbaijan	0	0	2	2
16	Bulgaria	0	0	1	1
16	India	0	0	1	1
16	Lithuania	0	0	1	1
16	Tajikistan	0	0	1	1
16	Uzbekistan	0	0	1	1
Totals (20 entries)		13	13	26	52

== Events and concerns ==
=== Alleged gold medal fixing ===
In September 2011, the BBC Newsnight programme uncovered evidence that $9 million (£5.9 million) worth of secret payments were paid to World Series Boxing (WSB), a subcompany of the International Boxing Association (AIBA), by Azerbaijan in return for two gold medals. The AIBA denied the allegations, stating that the secret payments were a loan from an Azerbaijani investor. The AIBA and the International Olympic Committee both started inquiries into the allegations. Subsequently, the AIBA rejected any allegations of corruption, stating “Any suggestion that the loan was made in return for promises of gold medals at the 2012 Olympics is preposterous and utterly untrue".

=== Refereeing ===
There were several events in boxing in the 2012 Summer Olympics:

Match	Controversy
Magomed Abdulhamidov; Azerbaijan v. Satoshi Shimizu; Japan (Bantamweight)	Azerbaijani boxer Magomed Abdulhamidov, who started the round with a two-point lead, touched the canvas six times in the final round of a bout against Satoshi Shimizu of Japan but still won a decision that included the round being scored 10–10. Referee Ishanguly Meretnyyazov from Turkmenistan waved off all the knockdowns and only gave a single warning. Shimizu and Japan protested and successfully appealed the decision. Meretnyyazov was removed from the pool of Olympic referees "with immediate effect" afterwards. According to the AIBA report of the incident, Abdulhamidov should have been given three standing eight counts and the bout scored as RSC in favor of Shimizu. As the initial decision was announced, Teddy Atlas, working as a commentator for U.S. broadcaster NBC, said: "Unbelievable! That's what the referee wanted to do. He wanted to save that fighter. That's incredible!"
Ali Mazaheri; Iran v. Jose Larduet; Cuba (Heavyweight)	German referee Frank Scharmach was suspended for five days after the second-round disqualification of Iran heavyweight Ali Mazaheri for holding Cuba's Jose Larduet. Despite the discipline of the referee, the disqualification of Mazaheri stood, as he received three warnings during the bout. At the time of the disqualification, Mazaheri was ahead by two points. He later called the ruling "a setup."
Sumit Sangwan; India v. Yamaguchi Falcão; Brazil (Light heavyweight)	The Indian Olympic Committee lodged a protest against the judges decision in the match between Indian boxer Sumit Sangwan and Brazilian Yamaguchi Falcao. The judges awarded the match 15–14 in favour of the Brazilian. ESPN commentators who were surprised by the verdict called it "daylight robbery". However, the protest which was specific to Round 2 of the disputed match was turned down by the jury.
Vikas Krishan; India v. Errol Spence; United States (Welterweight)	American Errol Spence successfully appealed his initial 11–13 loss. Using video review, AIBA determined the bout referee gave too few cautions for holding fouls and should have awarded Spence at least four more points.
Evhen Khytrov; Ukraine v. Anthony Ogogo; Great Britain (Middleweight)	After the judges awarded the middleweight match to Ukrainian world number one boxer Yevhen Khytrov and Britain's Anthony Ogogo where both boxers scored 18 points to the British boxer, Ukrainian officials lodged an official protest as they felt aggrieved by the decision in the match where the Ukrainian boxer knocked his opponent down twice. As the appeal was rejected, the National Olympic Committee of Ukraine announced that they would appeal to the Court of Arbitration for Sport (CAS).
Vazgen Safaryants; Belarus v. Han Soon-Chul; South Korea (Lightweight)	After the match between Belarusian Vazgen Safaryants and South Korea's Han Soon-chul ended 13–13, and as the boxers remained tied on a countback, the judges awarded the match to the South Korean boxer. Subsequently, the coach of the Belarusian boxer appealed against the verdict but the appeal was turned down.
Manoj Kumar; India v. Tom Stalker; Great Britain (Light welterweight)	After the judges decision to award the match between British boxing team captain Tom Stalker and Indian boxer Manoj Kumar 20–16 in favour of Stalker, the Indian boxer questioned the scoring: "It's like a district competition where there's lots of cheating, cheating, cheating." The ring-side judges were also not in total agreement in the second round which was decided 9–5 in favour of Stalker with a Turkish referee awarding it 7–5 in favour of Kumar. Stalker said: "I don't deal with the scoring, I just get in there and fight. In amateur boxing it happens all the time. You think you've won by more points or something like that, and it's just up to the judges."
Tervel Pulev; Bulgaria v. Yamil Peralta; Argentina (Heavyweight)	After the judges' decision to award the match between Bulgarian boxing team captain Tervel Pulev and Argentinian boxer Yamil Peralta 13–10 in favour to Pulev, the Argentinian media said: "Another theft in the boxing, in spite of losing clearly the second round and only run during the third, Pulev and the judges, classify to semi-finals".
Mark Anthony Barriga; Philippines v. Birzhan Zhakypov; Kazakhstan (Light flyweight)	The Amateur Boxing Association of the Philippines (ABAP) filed a protest against the decision in the match between Filipino boxer Mark Anthony Barriga and his Kazakh opponent, Birzhan Zhakypov, claiming that Barriga was unfairly warned after being cautioned only once by Canadian referee Roland Labbe, whereas fouls made by Zhakypov (including wrestling Barriga onto the canvas twice) went unnoticed. The protest was turned down by AIBA without the fight tape being reviewed, claiming that the protest was "too subjective to review", and that the protest was lodged on emotional, rather than technical, grounds. In response to the verdict, ABAP president Ricky Vargas noted that "It seems in the battle of 'giants' justice is more difficult to attain for a small country like ours", with Philippine media having noted that a similar appeal filed by the United States had that match's result overturned by AIBA, and The Philippine Star noting that Kazakhstan is an influential member in AIBA and the Asian Boxing Confederation. Had the warning not been given, Barriga would have won the match 18–17.
Teymur Mammadov; Azerbaijan v. Siarhei Karneyeu; Belarus (Heavyweight)	After the match between Azerbaijani boxer Teymur Mammadov and Belarusian boxer Siarhei Karneyeu ended 19–19, the judges awarded the match to Mammadov. Karneyeu seemed to land the wide majority of punches in a third round where he was repeatedly held by Mammadov. The rules state if a boxer receives three warnings in one round, he is automatically disqualified. The excessive clutches, which were illegal, caused Greek referee Nikolaos Poutachidis to give Mammadov two warnings, but stopped short of giving him a third one. NBCOlympics.com replays showed that Mammadov had appeared to initiate more than three clinches during that period. Also if a fighter receives a warning for an infraction, his opponent can receive two points. The official scorecard showed that Karneyeu won the third round 6–4, meaning that if the judges gave Krneyeu full credit for Mammadov's conduct, he would have received four points for penalties—and just two points for punches landed. Belarus filed a protest but it was denied by the AIBA.
Custio Clayton; Canada v. Fred Evans; Great Britain (Welterweight)	The match between Canadian boxer Custio Clayton and British boxer Fred Evans ended with the scores tied at 14–14 and the judges awarded the match to Freddie Evans on the basis of a countback. Not satisfied with the decision, Canada lodged an appeal against the decision, on the basis that Evans was cautioned three separate times for holding during the bout but was not penalized a point for the infraction by the referee. The fight was subsequently reviewed and judged for a second time, but AIBA instead concluded that Evans was "incorrectly cautioned", and as a result did not deserve any point deductions. A news release issued by Boxing Canada director Daniel Trepanier stated: "We are very disappointed in this decision. Custio clearly won the fight in our opinion and this is not a good day for Olympic boxing."
Adilbek Niyazymbetov; Kazakhstan v. Oleksandr Gvozdyk; Ukraine (Light heavyweight)	Kazakhstan's Adilbek Niyazymbetov has scored a controversial victory over Ukraine's Oleksandr Gvozdyk in their light heavyweight semi-final. Gvozdyk made a decent start, producing the better quality in a close opening round that ended four points apiece. The Ukrainian was demonstrating some impressive accuracy with single shots that continually tagged Niyazymbetov. Despite being second best for most of the contest, Niyazymbetov found himself just a point behind as the third round approached. Gvozdyk was hardly troubled in the final round but still went on to drop a decision on countback (13–13).
