= 2011 World Amateur Boxing Championships – Heavyweight =

Boxing competitions

The Heavyweight competition was the second-highest weight class featured at the 2011 World Amateur Boxing Championships, held at the Heydar Aliyev Sports and Exhibition Complex. Boxers were limited to a maximum of 91 kilograms (201 lb) in body mass.

== Medalists ==
Gold	Oleksandr Usyk (UKR)
Silver	Teymur Mammadov (AZE)
Bronze	Siarhei Karneyeu (BLR)
Bronze	Wang Xuanxuan (CHN)

== Seeds ==
1. (Russia) Artur Beterbiyev (quarterfinals)
2. (Turkey) Bahram Muzaffer (second round)
3. (Azerbaijan) Teymur Mammadov (runner-up)
4. (France) Ludovic Groguhe (second round)
5. (Ecuador) Julio Castillo (third round)
6. (Republic of Ireland) Kenny Egan (second round)
7. (Cameroon) Romarick Ngoula (second round)
8. (Ukraine) Oleksandr Usyk (champion)
9. (Bulgaria) Tervel Pulev (third round)
10. (China) Wang Xuanxuan (semifinals)

== Draw ==
=== Finals ===
Semifinals
1	Oleksandr Usyk (UKR)	23
4	Siarhei Karneyeu (BLR)	10
3	Teymur Mammadov (AZE)	RET
2	Wang Xuanxuan (CHN)

Final
Oleksandr Usyk (UKR)	25
Teymur Mammadov (AZE)	15

=== Top half ===
==== Section 1 ====
Round 1
Mario Heredia (MEX)	RSC
Juan Oliva (ESP)
Mihail Muntean (MDA)	4
Mirzohidjon Abdullaev (UZB)	11
Wualfredo Rivero (VEN)	9
Eugenijus Tutkus (LTU)	15

Round 2
Artur Beterbiyev (RUS)	RET
Mario Heredia (MEX)
Jahon Qurbonov (TJK)	17
Manpreet Singh (IND)	9
Tervel Pulev (BUL)	9
Mirzohidjon Abdullaev (UZB)	7
Eugenijus Tutkus (LTU)	2
Oleksandr Usyk (UKR)	26

Round 3
Artur Beterbiyev (RUS)	RET
Jahon Qurbonov (TJK)
Tervel Pulev (BUL)
Oleksandr Usyk (UKR)	RET

Quarterfinals
Artur Beterbiyev (RUS)	13
Oleksandr Usyk (UKR)	17

==== Section 2 ====
Round 1
Rain Karlson (EST)	7
Davit Gogishvili (GEO)	13
Deivi Julio Blanco (COL)	14
Siarhei Karneyeu (BLR)	25
Yamil Peralta (ARG)	7
Samir El Mais (CAN)	15
Marko Radonjić (MNE)	7
Chouaib Bouloudinat (ALG)	14

Round 2
Julio Castillo (ECU)	12
Davit Gogishvili (GEO)	5
Siarhei Karneyeu (BLR)	26
Michał Olaś (POL)	14
Simon Nembhard (ENG)	WO
Samir El Mais (CAN)
Chouaib Bouloudinat (ALG)	17
Ludovic Groguhe (FRA)	12

Round 3
Julio Castillo (ECU)	13
Siarhei Karneyeu (BLR)	25
Simon Nembhard (ENG)	10
Chouaib Bouloudinat (ALG)	16

Quarterfinals
Siarhei Karneyeu (BLR)	22
Chouaib Bouloudinat (ALG)	8

=== Bottom half ===
==== Section 3 ====
Round 1
Dimitar Tashkov (MKD)	13
Anderson Emmanuel (BAR)	25
Christian Demaj (ALB)	12
Sammy Blyth (AUS)	10
Damir Beljo (BIH)	17
Karem Elghanam (EGY)	9
Lubos Velecky (CZE)
Jose Larduet (CUB)	RSC

Round 2
Teymur Mammadov (AZE)	23
Anderson Emmanuel (BAR)	7
Christian Demaj (ALB)	18
Jozsef Darmos (HUN)	20
Stjepan Vugdelija (CRO)	18
Damir Beljo (BIH)	6
Jose Larduet (CUB)
Kenny Egan (IRL)	RET

Round 3
Teymur Mammadov (AZE)	24
Jozsef Darmos (HUN)	9
Stjepan Vugdelija (CRO)
Jose Larduet (CUB)	RSC

Quarterfinals
Teymur Mammadov (AZE)	24
Jose Larduet (CUB)	20

==== Section 4 ====
Round 1
Peter Pedersen (DEN)	9
Ihab Al-Matbouli (JOR)	30
Reza Moradkhani (IRI)	13
Sergei Skliarov (KGZ)	8
Joseph Williams (USA)	19
Sandro Dirnfeld (SVK)	13
Gunnar Kristinsson (ISL)
Alexander Povernov (GER)	RSC

Round 2
Romarick Ngoula (CMR)	13
Ihab Al-Matbouli (JOR)	25
Reza Moradkhani (IRI)	4
Wang Xuanxuan (CHN)	16
Vassiliy Levit (KAZ)	14
Joseph Williams (USA)	6
Alexander Povernov (GER)	RSC
Bahram Muzaffer (TUR)

Round 3
Ihab Al-Matbouli (JOR)	6
Wang Xuanxuan (CHN)	12
Vassiliy Levit (KAZ)	16
Alexander Povernov (GER)	8

Quarterfinals
Wang Xuanxuan (CHN)	11
Vassiliy Levit (KAZ)	9
