= Barbados at the 2011 Pan American Games =

- IOC code: BAR
- NOC: Barbados Olympic Association

in Guadalajara 14–30 October 2011
- Competitors: 52 in 11 sports
- Flag bearer: Shakera Reece
- Medals Ranked 24th: Gold 0 Silver 0 Bronze 2 Total 2

Pan American Games appearances (overview)
- 1963; 1967; 1971; 1975; 1979; 1983; 1987; 1991; 1995; 1999; 2003; 2007; 2011; 2015; 2019; 2023

Barbados competed at the 2011 Pan American Games in Guadalajara, Mexico from October 14 to 30, 2011. The Barbados team consisted of 52 athletes in 11 sports.

== Medalists ==
Medal	Name	Sport	Event	Date
Bronze	Shakera Reece	Athletics	Women's 100 metres	October 25
Bronze	Anderson Emmanuel	Boxing	Men's Heavyweight 91 kg	October 25

== Athletics ==
Barbados qualified four athletes.

Men

Athlete	Event	Preliminaries		Semifinals		Final	
Athlete	Event	Result	Rank	Result	Rank	Result	Rank
Ramon Gittens	100 m	10.45	16th q	10.37	7th	Did not advance	
Thorrold Murray	High jump					2.10 m.	11th
Justin Cummins	Javelin throw					64.34 m.	13th

Women

Athlete	Event	Semifinals		Final	
Athlete	Event	Result	Rank	Result	Rank
Shakera Reece	100 m	11.43	4th Q PB	10.26	(bronze) NR

== Badminton ==
Barbados qualified two badminton athletes.

Men

Athlete	Event	First round	Second round	Third round	Quarterfinals	Semifinals	Final	Rank
Athlete	Event	Opposition Result	Opposition Result	Opposition Result	Opposition Result	Opposition Result	Opposition Result	Rank
Andre Padmore	Men's singles	M Wongsodikromo (SUR); L 0–2 (8–21, 10–21)	Did not advance					

Women

Athlete	Event	First round	Second round	Third round	Quarterfinals	Semifinals	Final	Rank
Athlete	Event	Opposition Result	Opposition Result	Opposition Result	Opposition Result	Opposition Result	Opposition Result	Rank
Shari Watson	Women's singles	BYE	C Rivero (PER); L 0–2 (8–21, 8–21)	Did not advance				

Mixed

Athlete	Event	First round	Second round	Quarterfinals	Semifinals	Final	Rank
Athlete	Event	Opposition Result	Opposition Result	Opposition Result	Opposition Result	Opposition Result	Rank
Andre Padmore; Shari Watson	Mixed doubles	BYE	M Wongsodikromo (SUR); C Leefmas (SUR); L 1–2 (23–21, 14–21, 20–22)	Did not advance			

== Boxing ==
Barbados qualified two boxers.

Men

Athlete	Event	Quarterfinals	Semifinals	Final
Athlete	Event	Opposition Result	Opposition Result	Opposition Result
Cobia Breedy	Lightweight	Angel Gutierrez (MEX); L 7 - 27	Did not advance	
Anderson Emanuel	Heavyweight	Mario Heredia (MEX); W 24 - 17	Julio Castillo (ECU); L 6 - 24 (bronze)	Did not advance

== Cycling ==
Barbados received a wildcard to send one male cyclist.

=== Road cycling ===
Men

Athlete	Event	Time	Rank
Darren Matthews	Road race	3:45:04	15th

== Field hockey ==
Barbados qualified a men's and women's field hockey team. Each team was made up of sixteen athletes for a total of thirty-two.

=== Men ===
Team

- Kelvin Alleyne
- Andre Boyce
- Barry Clarke
- Dave Cox
- Aaron Forde
- Neil Franklin
- Paul Gill
- Kris Holder
- Randy Jules
- Dario Lewis
- Rodney Phillips
- Paul Reid
- Jamar Small
- Jabari Walcott
- Shonkeel Wharton
- Vernon Williams

Pos	Team	Pld	W	D	L	GF	GA	GD	Pts	Qualification
1	Canada	3	3	0	0	21	2	+19	9	Semi-finals
2	Chile	3	2	0	1	12	6	+6	6	Semi-finals
3	Trinidad and Tobago	3	1	0	2	14	11	+3	3	
4	Barbados	3	0	0	3	2	30	−28	0	

Source: PAHF

October 20, 2011
11:00

Chile	9 – 1	Barbados
Richter 3', 13', 22', 50'; Rodriguez 8'; Krainz 51', 67'; Richter 53'; Berczely 67'	Report	Forde 42'

Pan American Hockey Stadium
Umpires:
Vazquez (MEX), Scala (ARG)

October 22, 2011
14:00

Trinidad and Tobago	11 – 1	Barbados
Browne 3', 16'; Pierre 6', 36'; Chan 23', 68'; Scipio 27', 42'; Whittington 37'; De Gannes 39'; Toussaint 60'	Report	Walcott 9'

Pan American Hockey Stadium
Umpires:
Hooper (GUY), Hundley (USA)

October 24, 2011
09:00

Canada	10 – 0	Barbados
Froese 3'; Pereira 10'; Guest 10', 16', 62'; Tupper 25', 35', 46'; Pearson 49'; Short 54'	Report

Pan American Hockey Stadium
Umpires:
Soteriades II (USA), Scala (ARG)

Elimination stage

Crossover

October 27, 2011
19:30

Trinidad and Tobago	0 – 2	United States
	Report	Sundeen 33', 63'

Pan American Hockey Stadium
Umpires:
Springer (BAR), Scala (ARG)

Seventh place match

October 29, 2011
09:00

Trinidad and Tobago	9 – 1	Barbados
Toussaint 8', 20', 52', 67', 69'; Scipio 13', 39', 68'; Browne 16'	Report	Small 45'

Pan American Hockey Stadium
Umpires:
Lopez (URU), Vazquez (MEX)

=== Women ===
Team

- Lana Als
- Nicole Brathwaite
- Takirsha Cambridge
- Dionne Clarke
- Katrina Downes
- Chiaka Drakes
- Reyna Farnum
- Keisha Jordan
- Cher King
- Jehan Lashley
- Gillian Marville
- Telicia Morris
- Kimberley Rock
- Maria Sealy
- Tammisha Small
- Charlia Warner

Team	Pld	W	D	L	GF	GA	GD	Pts
Argentina (A)	3	3	0	0	37	3	+34	9
Canada (A)	3	2	0	1	15	8	+7	6
Barbados	3	1	0	2	4	31	−27	3
Trinidad and Tobago	3	0	0	3	3	17	−14	0

(A) Advanced to the semifinals

October 19, 2011
11:00

Canada	10 – 0	Barbados
Stairs 5', 26', 45'; Baker 16'; Culley 20', 68'; Gilis 30'; Haughn 31'; Roemer 37'; Raye 61'	Report

Pan American Hockey Stadium
Umpires:
Judefind (USA)
Perez(USA)

October 21, 2011
14:00

Trinidad and Tobago	2 – 4	Barbados
Thompson 17'; Quesnay 37'	Report	King 9'; Clarke 15'; Warner 32'; Sealy61'

Pan American Hockey Stadium
Umpires:
Castellanos (MEX)
Cheng (TPE)

October 23, 2011
09:00

Argentina	19 – 0	Barbados
Rebecchi 2', 24', 53'; Aymar 4', 19, 61'; Barrionuevo 13', 65'; Merino 15'; Sruoga 20'; Sanchez 22'; Garcia 23', 48', 50', 58'; Luchetti 31', 62'; Luchetti 42'; Maccari 56'	Report

Pan American Hockey Stadium
Umpires:
Sutton (USA),
Montesino (CHI)

Elimination stage

Crossover

October 26, 2011
09:00

Barbados	1 – 3	Mexico
King 13'	Report	Navarro 38'; Castillo 42'; Martinez 64'

Pan American Hockey Stadium
Umpires:
McClean (TRI), Sutton (USA)

Seventh place match

October 28, 2011
09:00

Barbados	1 – 3	Trinidad and Tobago
Warner 14'	Report	Wynne 24', 33'; Thompson 29'

Pan American Hockey Stadium
Umpires:
Montesino (CHI), Chenge (TPE)

== Squash ==
Barbados received a wildcard to send one male squash athlete.

Men

Event	Athlete(s)	First round	Second round	Quarterfinal	Semifinal	Final	Rank
Event	Athlete(s)	Opposition Result	Opposition Result	Opposition Result	Opposition Result	Opposition Result	Rank
Shawn Simpson	Singles	André L'Heureux (PAR); L 11 - 7, 4 - 11, 11 - 5, 6 - 11, 2 - 11	Did not advance				

== Shooting ==
Barbados qualified two shooters.

Men

Athlete	Event	Qualification		Final	
Athlete	Event	Score	Rank	Score	Rank
Calvert Herbert	50 m pistol	598	27th	Did not advance	
Calvert Herbert	10 m air pistol	546	31st	Did not advance	
Michael Maskell	Skeet	118	6th Q+6	141	4th

== Taekwondo ==
Barbados received a wildcard to send one male taekwondo athlete.

Men

Athlete	Event	Round of 16	Quarterfinals	Semifinals	Final	
Athlete	Event	Opposition Result	Opposition Result	Opposition Result	Opposition Result	Rank
Ryan Leach	Featherweight (-68kg)	Siddhartha Bhat (CAN); L DSQ	Did not advance			

== Tennis ==
Barbados qualified two male tennis players.

Men

Athlete	Event	First round	Second round	Round of 16	Quarterfinals	Semifinals	Final	Rank
Athlete	Event	Opposition Score	Opposition Score	Opposition Score	Opposition Score	Opposition Score	Opposition Score	Rank
Darian King	Singles	Diego Galeano (PAR); L 7 - 6 (3), 5 - 7, 4 - 6	Did not advance					
Haydn Lewis	Singles	Marcelo Arévalo (ESA); L 4 - 6, 4 - 6	Did not advance					
Darian King; Haydn Lewis	Doubles			Daniel Garza (MEX); Santiago Gonzalez (MEX); W 7 - 5, 6 - 7(4), [10-5]	Jorge Aguilar (CHI); Nicolás Massú (CHI); W 4 - 6, 7 - 6(8), [10-8]	Julio César Campozano (ECU); Roberto Andrés Quiroz (ECU); L 3 - 6, 6 - 1, [10-12]	Bronce medal match: Nicholas Monroe (USA); Greg Ouelette (USA); L 7 - 6(11), 2 - 6, [7-10]	4th

== Triathlon ==
Barbados qualified one male triathlete.

Men

Athlete	Event	Swim (1.5 km)	Trans 1	Bike (40 km)	Trans 2	Run (10 km)	Total	Rank
Jason Wilson	Individual	18:24; 13th	0:25; 4th	1:16:07; 17th	0:17; 22nd	33:44; 7th	1:50:09	7th
