= Boxing at the 2014 Asian Games – Men's 91 kg =

Boxing competitions

Men's 91 kg at the 2014 Asian Games
- Venue: Seonhak Gymnasium
- Date: 26 September – 3 October 2014
- Competitors: 12 from 12 nations

Medalists
gold medal	Anton Pinchuk	Kazakhstan
silver medal	Ali Mazaheri	Iran
bronze medal	Ihab Al-Matbouli	Jordan
bronze medal	Park Nam-hyeong	South Korea

The men's heavyweight (91 kilograms) event at the 2014 Asian Games took place from 26 September to 3 October 2014 at Seonhak Gymnasium, Incheon, South Korea.

Like all Asian Games boxing events, the competition was a straight single-elimination tournament. All bouts consisted of three three-minute rounds.

A total of 12 men from 12 countries competed in this heavyweight event, which was limited to fighters weighing less than 91 kilograms.

Anton Pinchuk of Kazakhstan won the gold medal. He beat Ali Mazaheri of Iran 3–0 on points in the final bout at the Seonhak Gymnasium. Ihab Al-Matbouli from Jordan and Park Nam-hyeong from the host nation South Korea shared the bronze medal after losing in the semifinals.

== Schedule ==
All times are Korea Standard Time (UTC+09:00)

Date	Time	Event
Friday, 26 September 2014	19:00	Preliminaries
Tuesday, 30 September 2014	19:00	Quarterfinals
Thursday, 2 October 2014	19:00	Semifinals
Friday, 3 October 2014	14:00	Final

== Results ==
Preliminaries
Rustam Tulaganov (UZB)	3
Wang Xuanxuan (CHN)	0
Sergei Parenko (KGZ)	0
Anton Pinchuk (KAZ)	3
Park Nam-hyeong (KOR)	2
Amritpreet Singh (IND)	1
Mohammed Al-Qahtani (KSA)	0
Sana Ullah (PAK)	3

Quarterfinals
Daiviin Otgonbayar (MGL)	0
Ali Mazaheri (IRI)	3
Ihab Al-Matbouli (JOR)	2
Jahon Qurbonov (TJK)	1
Rustam Tulaganov (UZB)	0
Anton Pinchuk (KAZ)	3
Park Nam-hyeong (KOR)	3
Sana Ullah (PAK)	0

Semifinals
Ali Mazaheri (IRI)	3
Ihab Al-Matbouli (JOR)	0
Anton Pinchuk (KAZ)	3
Park Nam-hyeong (KOR)	0

Final
Ali Mazaheri (IRI)	0
Anton Pinchuk (KAZ)	3
