= Boxing at the 2011 Pan American Games – Heavyweight =

Men's heavyweight at the 2011 Pan American Games
- Venue: Expo Guadalajara Arena
- Dates: October 21 – 28
- Competitors: 9 from 9 nations

Medalists
Gold medal	Lenier Pero	Cuba
Silver medal	Julio Castillo	Ecuador
Bronze medal	Yamil Peralta	Argentina
Bronze medal	Anderson Emmanuel	Barbados

Men's heavyweight boxing competitions at the 2011 Pan American Games in Guadalajara will be held from October 22 to October 29 at the Expo Guadalajara Arena. Heavyweights were limited to those boxers weighing less than or equal to 91 kilograms. The defending champion was Osmay Acosta from Cuba.

Like all Pan American boxing events, the competition was a straight single-elimination tournament. Both semifinal losers were awarded bronze medals, so no boxers competed again after their first loss. Bouts consisted of four rounds of two minutes each, with one-minute breaks between rounds. Punches scored only if the white area on the front of the glove made full contact with the front of the head or torso of the opponent. Five judges scored each bout; three of the judges had to signal a scoring punch within one second for the punch to score. The winner of the bout was the boxer who scored the most valid punches by the end of the bout.

== Results ==
All times are Central Standard Time (UTC-6).

=== Bracket ===
Round of 16; October 21, 2011; 18:00
Manuel Mariñez (DOM)	6
Steven Couture (CAN)	18

Quarterfinals; October 22, 2011; 18:00
Lenier Pero (CUB)	22
Steven Couture (CAN)	2
Yamil Peralta (ARG)	11
Wualfredo Rivero (VEN)	7
Mario Heredia (MEX)	17
Anderson Emmanuel (BAR)	24
Julio Castillo (ECU)	12
Deivi Julio Blanco (COL)	7

Semifinals; October 25, 2011; 19:00
Lenier Pero (CUB)	13
Yamil Peralta (ARG)	9
Anderson Emmanuel (BAR)	6
Julio Castillo (ECU)	24

Finals; October 28, 2011; 19:00
Lenier Pero (CUB)	16
Julio Castillo (ECU)	10
