= Boxing at the 2015 Pan American Games – Men's heavyweight =

Men's heavyweight at the 2015 Pan American Games
- Venue: Oshawa Sports Centre
- Dates: July 18–24
- Competitors: 8 from 8 nations

Medalists
Gold medal	Erislandy Savón	Cuba
Silver medal	Deivi Julio	Colombia
Bronze medal	Samir El-Mais	Canada
Bronze medal	Miguel Veliz	Chile

The men's heavyweight competition of the boxing events at the 2015 Pan American Games in Toronto, Ontario, Canada, was held between the 18 and 24 of July at the Oshawa Sports Centre. The defending champion is Lenier Pero of Cuba. Heavyweights is limited to those boxers weighing less than or equal to 91 kilograms.

Like all Pan American boxing events, the competition is a straight single-elimination tournament. Both semifinal losers are awarded bronze medals, so no boxers compete again after their first loss. Bouts consist of a 3 rounds "10-point must" scoring system used in the pro game, where the winner of each round must be awarded 10 points and the loser a lesser amount, and the elimination of the padded headgear. Five judges scored each bout. The winner will be the boxer who scored the most at the end of the match.

== Qualification ==
A total of eight boxers qualified to compete.

== Results ==
=== Bracket ===
Quarterfinals; July 18, 2015
Deivi Julio (COL)	3
Julio Castillo (ECU)	0
Juan Nogueira (BRA)	1
Samir El-Mais (CAN)	2
Miguel Veliz (CHI)	3
Alfonso Flores Millan (VEN)	0
Joaquín Berroa (DOM)	0
Erislandy Savón (CUB)	3

Semifinals; July 22, 2015
Deivi Julio (COL)	WO
Samir El-Mais (CAN)
Miguel Veliz (CHI)	0
Erislandy Savón (CUB)	3

Finals; July 24, 2015
Deivi Julio (COL)	1
Erislandy Savón (CUB)	2
