= Efetobor Wesley Apochi =

Nigerian boxer

Efetobor Apochi
Personal information
- Full name: Efetobor Wesley Apochi
- Nationality: Nigeria
- Born: 2 November 1987 (age 39) Orogun, Delta State, Nigeria

Sport
- Sport: Boxing
- Weight class: Heavyweight
Medal record
Men's amateur boxing
Representing Nigeria
Commonwealth Games
Bronze medal – third place	2014 Glasgow	Heavyweight
African Games
Silver medal – second place	2011 Maputo	Heavyweight
Silver medal – second place	2015 Brazzaville	Heavyweight

Efetobor Wesley Apochi (born 2 November 1987 in Orogun, Delta State, Nigeria) is the captain of the Nigerian boxing team and has represented Nigeria in several international tournaments as a heavyweight.

Efetobor Apochi entered international boxing competition at the 2011 All-Africa Games, where he surprised the boxing world by taking second. Apochi then represented Nigeria at the 2013 World Championships, winning his first match before falling to the eventual gold medalist, Teymur Mammadov. In January 2014, Apochi joined the Mexico Guerreros of the World Series of Boxing.

At the 2014 Commonwealth Games, Efetobor Apochi captained the Nigerian boxing team. He knocked out his initial opponent in the first round and then upset Australia's Jai Opetaia in the quarterfinals. In the semi-finals, Apochi lost to the eventual gold medalist, Samir El Mais. As a result, Apochi received a bronze medal.

Apochi studied microbiology at the Federal University of Technology Owerri.

== Professional boxing record ==
14 fights	12 wins	2 losses
By knockout	12	0
By decision	0	2

No.	Result	Record	Opponent	Type	Round, time	Date	Location	Notes
14	Win	12–2	Lucas Pontes Da Silva	TKO	5 (10), 2:33	16 Feb 2024	Whitesands Events Center, Plant City, Florida, U.S.	
13	Loss	11–2	Adrian Taylor	SD	8	16 Apr 2022	AT&T Stadium, Arlington, Texas, U.S.	
12	Loss	11–1	Brandon Glanton	SD	10	27 Jun 2021	The Armory, Minneapolis, Minnesota, U.S.	
11	Win	11–0	Deon Nicholson	KO	3 (12), 1:12	17 Apr 2021	Shrine Exposition Theater, Los Angeles, California, U.S.	
10	Win	10–0	Joe Jones	KO	3 (10), 0:51	14 Nov 2020	Peacock Theater, Los Angeles, California, U.S.	
9	Win	9–0	Larry Pryor	TKO	4 (4), 2:09	4 Oct 2019	Arena Theatre, Houston, Texas, U.S.	
8	Win	8–0	Earl Newman	KO	7 (8), 2:12	25 May 2019	Beau Rivage Resort & Casino, Biloxi, Mississippi, U.S.	
7	Win	7–0	Raymond Ochieng	TKO	2 (6), 1:57	23 Feb 2019	Minneapolis Armory, Minneapolis, Minnesota, U.S.	
6	Win	6–0	Eric Abraham	TKO	1 (6), 2:20	22 Dec 2018	Barclays Center, Brooklyn, New York, U.S.	
5	Win	5–0	Aaron Chavers	TKO	1 (6), 0:18	24 Aug 2018	Minneapolis Armory, Minneapolis, Minnesota, U.S.	
4	Win	4–0	Cashton Young	TKO	3 (6), 1:43	26 May 2018	Beau Rivage Resort & Casino, Biloxi, Mississippi, U.S.	
3	Win	3–0	Darrius Flowers	TKO	2 (6), 2:16	10 Mar 2018	Freeman Coliseum, San Antonio, Texas, U.S.	
2	Win	2–0	Leo Pia	KO	1 (4), 1:52	23 Sep 2017	Alamodome, San Antonio, Texas, U.S.	
1	Win	1–0	Daniel Mejia Hernandez	TKO	2 (4), 2:05	30 Jul 2017	Mechanics Bank Arena, Bakersfield, California, U.S.	

== See also ==
- Boxing at the 2014 Commonwealth Games – Heavyweight
- 2013 AIBA World Boxing Championships – Heavyweight
- 2012 African Boxing Olympic Qualification Tournament § Heavyweight
- Boxing at the 2011 All-Africa Games
