= Stephen Lavelle =

Scottish boxer

Stephen Lavelle (born 14 August 1990) is a Scottish retired heavyweight boxer.

== Career ==
Lavelle is best known for winning a bronze medal at the 2014 Commonwealth Games in Glasgow. He secured the medal after he progressed through to the semi-finals when he defeated India's Armritpreet Singh in the quarter-finals on 30 July 2014. In the semi-final on 1 August 2014, Lavelle was defeated by New Zealander David Light. After defeating Lavelle, Light then progressed through to the final on 2 August 2014. Light was subsequently defeated by Canadian Samir El-Mais.

== Legal issues ==
In April 2018, Lavelle was charged with assault occasioning bodily harm and common assault after an incident at the SinCity nightclub in Surfers Paradise on the Gold Coast in Australia. Lavelle appeared in Southport Magistrates Court on 31 October 2018, where he was found guilty of assault and causing bodily harm.

The court heard Lavelle had urinated on a dance floor next to two girls, after which a cousin of one of the girls confronted Lavelle about his behaviour. A fight between Lavelle and the man broke out when Lavelle commenced throwing punches, one of which struck one of the girls. The magistrate dismissed the suggestion that Lavelle had acted in self-defence, and handed him a nine-month suspended sentence.
