= Larduet =

Larduet is a surname. Notable people with the surname include:

- José Larduet (born 1990), Cuban boxer
- Manrique Larduet (born 1996), Cuban artistic gymnast
