= Chouaib Bouloudinat =

Algerian boxer (born 1987)

Chouaib Bouloudinat (or Bouloudinats; born 8 January 1987, in Constantine) is an Algerian boxer who won the 2011 All-Africa Games and fought at the 2012 Olympics.

At the 2011 World Amateur Boxing Championships, he beat three opponents, then lost to Siarhei Karneyeu (BLR).

At the 2011 All-Africa Games, he won gold.

He easily won his Olympic qualifier but lost his first bout in London to Yamil Peralta, see results.

He qualified to represent Algeria at the 2020 Summer Olympics.
