= Ihab Al-Matbouli =

Jordanian boxer (born 1985)

Ihab Al-Matbouli (born November 6, 1985, in Al-Baqah) is a Jordanian boxer who competed at the 2012 Summer Olympics. The light heavyweight is Jordan's first Olympic boxer.

== Career ==
At the 2011 World Amateur Boxing Championships (results) he competed in the heavyweight division (91 kg/201 lbs limit), beating two opponents but losing to Wang Xuanxuan in the third round.

At the Olympic qualifier he dropped down a weight class to light-heavyweight (81 kg limit), beat two opponents to qualify, then lost to Sumit Sangwan. At the Games proper (results) he defeated Nigeria's Lukman Lawal but was outclassed by world champion Julio César la Cruz 8-25.
