= Yushan Nijiati =

Chinese boxer (born 1986)

Personal information
- Full name: 玉山 尼加提
- Nationality: China
- Born: July 1, 1986 (age 40) Altay, Xinjiang
- Height: 1.88 m (6 ft 2 in)
- Weight: 91 kg (201 lb)

Sport
- Sport: Boxing
- Weight class: Heavyweight
- Club: People's Liberation Army
Medal record
World Amateur Championships
Bronze medal – third place	2007 Chicago	Heavyweight

Yushan Nijiati (Kazakh: Үсен Нижат, romanized: Üsen Nijat; born June 1, 1986) is a Chinese amateur boxer of Kazakh ethnicity best known for winning the bronze medal at the 2007 World Championships in the 201 lb/91 kg division.

== Career ==
He lost to eventual winner Clemente Russo on points in the semifinal. He qualified for the 2008 Olympics in his native country at Heavyweight but lost his first bout to Oleksandr Usyk 3-24.
