= Boxing at the 2014 Commonwealth Games – Heavyweight =

Boxing competitions

Boxing – Heavyweight at the 2014 Commonwealth Games
- Venue: Scottish Exhibition and Conference Centre
- Dates: 27 July – 2 August 2014
- Competitors: 13 from 13 nations

Medalists
gold medal	Samir El-Mais	Canada
silver medal	David Light	New Zealand
bronze medal	Efetobor Apochi	Nigeria
bronze medal	Stephen Lavelle	Scotland

The Heavyweight boxing competition at the 2014 Commonwealth Games in Glasgow, Scotland took place between 27 July and 2 August at the Scottish Exhibition and Conference Centre.

Like all Commonwealth boxing events, the competition was a straight single-elimination tournament. Both semifinal losers were awarded bronze medals, so no boxers competed again after their first loss. Bouts consisted of three rounds of three minutes each, with one-minute breaks between rounds. Punches scored only if the front of the glove made full contact with the front of the head or torso of the opponent. Five judges scored each bout; three of the judges had to signal a scoring punch within one second for the punch to score. The winner of the bout was the boxer who scored the most valid punches by the end of the bout.

== Schedule ==
All times are British Summer Time (UTC+1)

Date	Time	Round
Sunday 27 July 2014	17:00 & 22:37	Round of 16
Wednesday 30 July 2014	13:20	Quarter-finals
Friday 1 August 2014	19:10	Semi-finals
Saturday 2 August 2014	19:15	Final

== Medalists ==
Gold	Samir El-Mais; Canada
Silver	David Light; New Zealand
Bronze	Efetobor Apochi; Nigeria
Bronze	Stephen Lavelle; Scotland

== Results ==
Round of 16
Warren Baister (ENG)	2
Steven Ward (NIR)	1
Krystian Borucki (IOM)
Efetobor Apochi (NGR)	TKO
Jai Opetaia (AUS)	3
Filimaua Hala (SAM)	0
Kody Davies (WAL)	0
Stephen Lavelle (SCO)	3
David Light (NZL)	KO
Muhammad Meeraj Omar (MAS)

Quarter-finals
Samir El-Mais (CAN)	2
Warren Baister (ENG)	1
Efetobor Apochi (NGR)	3
Jai Opetaia (AUS)	0
Aamritpreet Singh (IND)	0
Stephen Lavelle (SCO)	3
David Light (NZL)	3
Charles Okoth (KEN)	0

Semi-finals
Samir El-Mais (CAN)	3
Efetobor Apochi (NGR)	0
Stephen Lavelle (SCO)	1
David Light (NZL)	2

Final
Samir El-Mais (CAN)	2
David Light (NZL)	1
