= José Larduet =

Cuban boxer (born 1990)

Personal information
- Full name: José Larduet Gómez
- Born: February 23, 1990 (age 36) Santiago de Cuba, Cuba

Sport
- Sport: Boxing
- Weight class: Light heavyweight, Super heavyweight
Medal record
Men's amateur boxing
Representing Cuba
World Amateur Championships
Bronze medal – third place	2009 Milan	Light heavyweight
Pan American Championship
Gold medal – first place	2017 Tegucigalpa	Super heavyweight
Central American and Caribbean Games
Gold medal – first place	2018 Barranquilla	Super heavyweight
Youth World Championships
Gold medal – first place	2008 Guadalajara	Light heavyweight

José Larduet Gómez (born February 23, 1990, in Santiago de Cuba) is a Cuban amateur boxer best known for winning light-heavyweight bronze at the 2009 World Amateur Boxing Championships.

In November 2008 he won gold at the 2008 Youth World Amateur Boxing Championships.

He added a Cuban Senior title in January 2009 (held at Playa Giron).

At the 2009 World Amateur Boxing Championships he won bronze after being edged by Russian favorite Artur Beterbiyev 6:10.

== Heavyweight ==
At the 2011 World Amateur Boxing Championships he lost his quarterfinal 20:24 to Teymur Mammadov but qualified for the Olympics.

At the 2012 Summer Olympics he lost to Clemente Russo in the quarter finals.
