= David Light (boxer) =

New Zealand amateur boxer (born 1991)

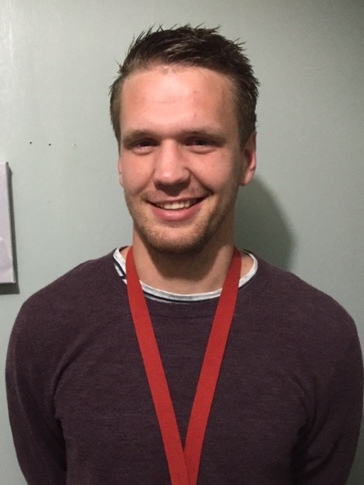

Personal information
- Nationality: New Zealander
- Born: David Thomas Light; 13 November 1991 (age 35) Takapuna, New Zealand
- Height: 1.87 m (6 ft 2 in)
- Weight: Cruiserweight

Boxing career
- Reach: 193 cm (76 in)
- Stance: Orthodox

Boxing record
- Total fights: 21
- Wins: 20
- Win by KO: 12
- Losses: 1
Medal record
Men's amateur boxing
Representing New Zealand
Commonwealth Games
| Silver medal – second place | 2014 Glasgow | Heavyweight |

David Light (born 13 November 1991) is a New Zealand professional boxer. As an amateur, he competed in the men's heavyweight division at the 2014 Commonwealth Games in Glasgow where he won the silver medal against Canada's Samir El-Mais. Professionally, Light is a former WBO World Cruiserweight title contender, where he fought Lawrence Okolie in March 2023.

== Early life ==
David is the youngest of eight children to New Zealand inventor Len Light who invented the world's first do-it-yourself yoghurt maker, founding the then family business of Easiyo in 1992 and later of New Zealand Pure Dairy Ltd.

== Amateur career ==
David had reached the semifinal after knocking out Malaysia's Meeraj Omar in the second round of his first bout, before defeating Kenya's Charles Odhiambo Okoth in a unanimous decision.

Light joined fellow boxer, David Nyika, in bringing home rare Commonwealth Games boxing medals to New Zealand. The last time that two Kiwi boxers returned from the Commonwealth Games with both a gold and a silver medal was in the Perth Commonwealth Games in 1962.

Following his Commonwealth success, Light was full of admiration for the Kiwi team but made controversial remarks regarding professional boxing: "... us boys in the New Zealand team, we always joke that going pro is when you give up on actual boxing ... You're cashing in on your talent and you're fighting bums."

Other successes for Light in 2014 include placing 2nd in his events at the 2014 boxing tournaments held in Belgrade, Serbia and 3rd at the 2014 GeeBee Competitions. Light has been in the national team since 2011.

=== 2011 North Island Golden Gloves Tournament ===
Elite Heavyweight (91 kg)

1. Defeated E Enoka in Semifinals
2. Lost Tino Honey in finals

=== 2011 New Zealand National Championship ===
Elite Heavyweight (91 kg)

1. Defeated Kahukura Bentson in Quarterfinals
2. Defeated Floyd Masson in Semifinals
3. Defeated Tino Honey in finals

=== 2012 New Zealand National Championship ===
Elite Heavyweight (91 kg)

1. Defeated Hale Faiumu in semifinals
2. Defeated Toa Leutele in finals

=== 2013 New Zealand National Championship ===
Elite Heavyweight (91 kg):

1. Defeated Floyd Masson in semifinals
2. Defeated Tino Honey in finals

=== 2014 Commonwealth Games ===
Heavyweight (91 kg)

1. Defeated Muhammad Meeraj Omar (Malaysia) in Round of 16
2. Defeated Charles Okoth (Kenya) in quarterfinals
3. Defeated Stephen Lavelle (Scotland) in semifinal
4. Lost Samir El-Mais (Canada) in final

== Professional career ==
=== International fight, Regional titles 2018 - 2019 ===
In October 2018, Light took on Fijian boxer James Singh in his ninth fight of his professional boxing career. Light won the fight by first-round knockout. The following month, Light took on another Fijian boxer Savenaca Naliva for the WBF International Cruiserweight title. This is the first time in lights professional career that he fought for an international title. Light won the fight by third round stoppage, winning his first international title. In December 2018, Light took on Lance Bryant on a Joseph Parker undercard. Light won the fight by second round stoppage.

In May 2019, Light took a major risk by taking on two time world title challenger Australian Mark Flanagan for the vacant WBO Oriental Cruiserweight title. Light won the fight by Unanimous Decision. After winning the fight, Light received the ranking of 14th in the WBO. Light went on to fight another Australian World title contender Trent Broadhurst. Light won fight by third round stoppage with Broadhurst knocked down four times in the fight. The fight was surrounded by controversy for multiple reasons including Broadhurst coming into the fight with an ear injury and Light making the injury worse. One of the biggest controversy surrounding the fight was the judging on the fight. Before the stoppage, the judges did not recognise the knockdown that, giving incorrect scoring to the cards. Light finished his 2019 with the ranking of 8th in WBO, 14th in IBF, 30th in the WBC and 38th on Boxrec.

=== Covid 19, ACL Injury, World title eliminator 2020 - 2022 ===
Unfotunately due to COVID-19 pandemic, majority of 2020 was inactive. In December 2020, Light took on Mose Auimatagi Jnr, defending his WBO Oriental Cruiserweight title. Light won the fight by Unanimous Decision. Light will return to the ring after recovering from an ACL injury in 2022. Light would make is USA debut when he took on Anthony Martinez in May 2022, in Florida. This will be the biggest title fight of his professional career so far for the WBO International Cruiserweight title. Light won the fight by first-round knockout. Light took on Indian boxer Vikas Singh in October 2022 in his return to Australia. The fight was on a 19 fight card which was held on Lights promoter Matt Rose event. Light won the fight by second-round knockout. In December 2022, Light would return to Florida to take on Brandon Glanton in a WBO World title eliminator. Light defending his WBO International title and Glanton defending his WBO Global title. Light won the fight by a close Split Decision with the world title shot expected to happen in March or April 2023.

=== World title fight, retirement 2023 ===
On 5 December 2022, the WBO ordered negotiations between WBO World Cruiserweight champion Lawrence Okolie promoter Eddie Hearn and Lights promoter Matt Rose to negotiated a mandatory world title fight between the two boxers. The two were given 20 days to negotiate. On 6 December 2022, WBO announced that the World title fight will be going to the Purse bid on 14 December in Puerto Rico. On 13 December, Okolie team requested a 7-day extension to continue their negotiations between them and Lights team. Lights team supported the extension and WBO accepted. WBO stated if an agreement does not reach, the purse bid would be held on 22 December in Puerto Rico. It was revealed on 15 December that the world title fight would likely happen in the UK in March 2023. On 23 December, it was announced that both team have come to an agreement and will fight in the UK on 11 March. The fight will be promoted by Ben Shalom under UK Boxing promotion "Boxxer". This is the same promoter for Joseph Parker. Leading into the World title fight, he received a significant ranking increase in the world bodies including 1st with the WBO and 5th in the IBF. Light lost the fight by unanimous decision, but Light was praised for his toughness. After the fight, Lights trainer Isaac Peach, blast the referee for allowing Lawrence Okolie to fowl multiple times throughout the fight. A month after the fight, it was announced that Light suffered a stroke as a result of the damage he sustained during the fight. Due to this, Light was forced to retire from boxing.

== Professional boxing record ==
| 21 fights | 20 wins | 1 loss |
|---|---|---|
| By knockout | 12 | 0 |
| By decision | 8 | 1 |

| No. | Result | Record | Opponent | Type | Round, time | Date | Location | Notes |
|---|---|---|---|---|---|---|---|---|
| 21 | Loss | 20–1 | Lawrence Okolie | UD | 12 | 25 Mar 2023 | AO Arena, Manchester, England | For WBO cruiserweight title |
| 20 | Win | 20–0 | Brandon Glanton | SD | 10 | 2 Dec 2022 | Whitesands Events Center, Plant City, Florida, US | Won vacant WBO International and WBO Global cruiserweight titles |
| 19 | Win | 19–0 | Vikas Singh | KO | 2 (8), 1:56 | 8 Oct 2022 | Entertainment Centre, Newcastle, Australia | |
| 18 | Win | 18–0 | Anthony Martinez | TKO | 1 (10), 2:57 | 7 May 2022 | Hialeah Park Racing & Casino, Hialeah, Florida, US | Won vacant WBO International cruiserweight title |
| 17 | Win | 17–0 | Mose Auimatagi Jr. | UD | 10 | 19 Dec 2020 | ABA Stadium, Auckland, New Zealand | Retained WBO Oriental cruiserweight title |
| 16 | Win | 16–0 | Lance Bryant | TKO | 1 (10), 1:09 | 13 Nov 2020 | SkyCity Theatre, Auckland, New Zealand | Retained PBCNZ cruiserweight title |
| 15 | Win | 15–0 | Trent Broadhurst | TKO | 3 (10), 2:36 | 6 Dec 2019 | International Convention Centre, Sydney, Australia | Retained WBO Oriental cruiserweight title |
| 14 | Win | 14–0 | German Garcia Montes | UD | 8 | 31 Aug 2019 | ABA Stadium, Auckland, New Zealand | |
| 13 | Win | 13–0 | Mark Flanagan | UD | 10 | 18 May 2019 | ABA Stadium, Auckland, New Zealand | Won vacant WBO Oriental cruiserweight title |
| 12 | Win | 12–0 | Jordan Mororoa | UD | 6 | 2 Mar 2019 | ABA Stadium, Auckland, New Zealand | |
| 11 | Win | 11–0 | Lance Bryant | TKO | 2 (6), 1:05 | 15 Dec 2018 | Horncastle Arena, Christchurch, New Zealand | |
| 10 | Win | 10–0 | Savenaca Naliva | TKO | 3 (10), 1:55 | 2 Nov 2018 | ABA Stadium, Auckland, New Zealand | Won vacant WBF Intercontinental cruiserweight title |
| 9 | Win | 9–0 | James Singh | KO | 1 (6), 2:59 | 13 Oct 2018 | Chao Shan General Association, Auckland, New Zealand | |
| 8 | Win | 8–0 | Hunter Sam | UD | 6 | 29 Sep 2018 | ABA Stadium, Auckland, New Zealand | |
| 7 | Win | 7–0 | Thomas Russell | TKO | 3 (6), 2:56 | 25 Aug 2018 | ABA Stadium, Auckland, New Zealand | |
| 6 | Win | 6–0 | Daniel Tai | UD | 6 | 21 Jul 2018 | ABA Stadium, Auckland, New Zealand | |
| 5 | Win | 5–0 | Thomas Russell | TKO | 3 (6), 1:57 | 9 Jun 2018 | ABA Stadium, Auckland, New Zealand | |
| 4 | Win | 4–0 | Cory Enoka | TKO | 3 (10), 1:56 | 21 Apr 2018 | ABA Stadium, Auckland, New Zealand | Won vacant PBCNZ cruiserweight title |
| 3 | Win | 3–0 | Tussi Asafo | TKO | 1 (4), 2:59 | 16 Mar 2018 | ABA Stadium, Auckland, New Zealand | |
| 2 | Win | 2–0 | Vaimoli Ioelu | UD | 4 | 18 Nov 2017 | ABA Stadium, Auckland, New Zealand | |
| 1 | Win | 1–0 | Lui Te'o | KO | 2 (4) | 3 Nov 2017 | ABA Stadium, Auckland, New Zealand | |

== Awards and recognitions ==
- 2019 Gladrap Boxing Awards Boxer of the year (Nominated)
- 2019 Gladrap Boxing Awards Male boxer of the year (Nominated)
- 2019 Gladrap Boxing Awards Knockout of the year (Nominated)
- 2019 Gladrap Boxing Awards Champion of the year (Nominated)
- 2019 Gladrap Boxing Awards International fight of the year (Won)
- 2019 Gladrap Boxing Awards Worst cut of the year (Nominated)
- 2019 Gladrap Boxing Awards Best Looking male boxer of the year (Nominated)
- 2020 New Zealand Fighter Boxing Awards International Champion of the year (Won)
- 2020 New Zealand Fighter Boxing Awards Male boxer of the year (Won)
- 2022 New Zealand Boxing Awards Champion of the year (Won)
- 2022 New Zealand Boxing Awards International Fight of the year (Won)

Sporting positions
Regional boxing titles
| New title | New Zealand National (PBCNZ version) cruiserweight Champion; 21 April 2018 – 2021 | Vacant Title next held by Joshua Francis |
| Vacant Title last held by Damir Beljo | WBF Intercontinental cruiserweight champion 2 November 2018 | Vacant |
| Vacant Title last held by Yury Kashinsky | WBO Oriental cruiserweight champion 18 May 2019 – 25 March 2023 | Vacant |
| Vacant Title last held by Lawrence Okolie | WBO International cruiserweight champion 7 May 2022 – 25 March 2023 | Vacant |
| Preceded by Brandon Glanton | WBO Global cruiserweight champion 2 December 2022 – 25 March 2023 | Vacant |
