= Yamil Peralta =

Argentine boxer (born 1991)

Personal information
- Born: Yamil Alberto Peralta Jara; 16 July 1991 (age 35) Tres de Febrero, Buenos Aires Province, Argentina
- Weight: Cruiserweight

Boxing career
- Stance: Orthodox

Boxing record
- Total fights: 21
- Wins: 18
- Win by KO: 10
- Losses: 2
- Draws: 1
Medal record
Men's amateur boxing
Representing Argentina
World Amateur Championships
| Bronze medal – third place | 2013 Almaty | Heavyweight |
Pan American Games
| Bronze medal – third place | 2011 Guadalajara | Heavyweight |
Pan American Championship
| Silver medal – second place | 2017 Tegucigalpa | Heavyweight |
South American Games
| Gold medal – first place | 2014 Santiago | Light Heavyweight |
| Bronze medal – third place | 2010 Medellin | Light Heavyweight |

Yamil Alberto Peralta Jara (Note: In this Spanish name, the first or paternal surname is Peralta and the second or maternal family name is Jara.) (born 16 July 1991 in Tres de Febrero, Buenos Aires Province) is an Argentine boxer who won Heavyweight Bronze at the PanAm Games 2011 and later qualified for the Olympics.

== Career ==
At the 2010 South American Games, Peralta competed at light heavyweight. He reached the semifinals, where he was defeated by Carlos Gongora, therefore winning the bronze medal. After these Games, he moved up to the heavyweight division.

At the 2011 Pan American Games he lost the heavyweight semifinal to eventual champion Lenier Pero 9:13. At the 2011 World Amateur Boxing Championships he lost his first bout to Canadian Samir El Mais, whom he beat 15:12 at the Olympic qualifier in a rematch. This result was enough ensure his qualification for the 2012 Olympics although he lost the final to Michael Hunter 10:12.

At the Boxing at the 2012 Summer Olympics – Men's heavyweight he defeated Chouaib Bouloudinat but lost to Tervel Pulev 10:13.

At the 2013 World Championships, he won a bronze medal.

In 2014 he turned professional.

In 2022, Yamil remained undefeated at 13-0 until he fought Canadian Ryan Rozicki (15–1) on 7 May for the WBC International Cruiserweight title in Sydney Nova Scotia, Canada. In a statement made by Rozicki's promoter Dan Otter, the rematch has been scheduled for the fall of 2022.

== Professional boxing record ==
| 21 fights | 18 wins | 2 losses |
|---|---|---|
| By knockout | 10 | 0 |
| By decision | 8 | 2 |
| Draws | 1 | |

| No. | Result | Record | Opponent | Type | Round, time | Date | Location | Notes |
|---|---|---|---|---|---|---|---|---|
| 21 | Loss | 18-2-1 | Robin Sirwan Safar | SD | 12 | 22 May 2026 | SAP Center, San Jose, California, US | Lost WBC silver cruiserweight title |
| 20 | Win | 18-1-1 | Juan Diaz | KO | 2(10), 2:17 | 28 Feb 2026 | Club Atletico River Plate, Buenos Aires, Argentina | Won vacant WBA fedalatin cruiserweight title |
| 19 | Draw | 17–1–1 | Ryan Rozicki | MD | 12 | Dec 7, 2024 | Centre 200, Sydney, Nova Scotia, Canada | For vacant WBC interim cruiserweight title |
| 18 | Win | 17–1 | Thabiso Mchunu | SD | 10 | 22 Mar 2024 | Olive Convention Centre, Durban, South Africa | Won WBC Silver cruiserweight title |
| 17 | Win | 16–1 | Guillermo Ruben Andino | TKO | 4 (10), 0:50 | 29 Jul 2023 | Club Atletico River Plate, Buenos Aires, Argentina | |
| 16 | Win | 15–1 | Federico Javier Grandone | TKO | 7 (10), 2:07 | 11 Mar 2023 | Predio del Palacio Municipal de Malvinas Argentinas, Los Polvorines, Argentina | |
| 15 | Win | 14–1 | Fábio Maldonado | TKO | 3 (10), 1:40 | 17 Sep 2022 | Club Municipal Lagomarsino, Pilar, Argentina | Won vacant WBC International crusierweight title |
| 14 | Loss | 13–1 | Ryan Rozicki | SD | 10 | 7 May 2022 | Centre 200, Sydney, Nova Scotia, Canada | For vacant WBC International crusierweight title; despite Rozicki winning, a complaint from Peralta's team over unfair judging compelled the WBC to leave the title vacant and to declare the bout a no contest; however, the result was upheld by the Nova Scotia Combat Sport Authority who oversaw the fight. |
| 13 | Win | 13–0 | Mariano Angel Gudino | UD | 10 | 15 Jan 2022 | Palacio de Los Deportes, Mar del Plata, Argentina | Retained WBC Latino and Argentine cruiserweight titles |
| 12 | Win | 12–0 | Cesar Reynoso | TKO | 10 (10), 1:29 | 5 Nov 2021 | Microestadio Municipal Ricardo Rusticucci, Pilar, Argentina | |
| 11 | Win | 11–0 | Damian Munoz | TKO | 6 (6), 0:23 | 13 Aug 2021 | Microestadio Municipal Ricardo Rusticucci, Pilar, Argentina | |
| 10 | Win | 10–0 | Marcos Karalitzky | UD | 8 | 25 Jun 2021 | Microestadio Municipal, Hurlingham, Argentina | |
| 9 | Win | 9–0 | Dario Balmaceda | KO | 6 (10), 1:29 | 12 Mar 2021 | Parque de la Ciudad, Cutral Có, Argentina | Won Argentine cruiserweight title |
| 8 | Win | 8–0 | Angel Schmitt | KO | 4 (12), 2:23 | 11 Dec 2020 | Microestadio Municipal de Garín, Garín, Argentina | Retained South American cruiserweight title |
| 7 | Win | 7–0 | Marcos Karalitzky | UD | 12 | 30 Oct 2020 | Microestadio Municipal, Hurlingham, Argentina | Retained South American cruiserweight title |
| 6 | Win | 6–0 | Dario Balmaceda | TKO | 9 (12) | 1 Feb 2020 | Polideportivo Los Polvorines, Los Polvorines, Argentina | Won South American cruiserweight title |
| 5 | Win | 5–0 | Marcos Aumada | UD | 10 | 22 Nov 2019 | Club Sportivo Barracas, Buenos Aires, Argentina | Retained WBC Latino cruiserweight title |
| 4 | Win | 4–0 | Esteban Lopez | UD | 8 | 7 Sep 2019 | Club Atletico Lanus, Lanus, Argentina | |
| 3 | Win | 3–0 | Marcos Aumada | UD | 10 | 11 May 2019 | Club Atletico Huracan, Buenos Aires, Argentina | Won WBC Latino cruiserweight title |
| 2 | Win | 2–0 | Jairo Diaz | UD | 6 | 20 Oct 2018 | Club Union Central, Villa Maria, Argentina | |
| 1 | Win | 1–0 | Julio Cisneros | KO | 3 (6) | 25 Aug 2018 | Monaco Hotel & Resort, Villa Carlos Paz, Argentina | |
