= Guadalupe Martinez =

Interdisciplinary artist and educator

Guadalupe Martínez (born 1980, Argentina) is an interdisciplinary artist and educator based in Vancouver, BC, Canada. Through her multifaceted work, Martinez aims to create spaces of connection, care, discovery, and future dreaming, reflecting deeply on art, pedagogy, and place.

== Early life and education ==
Martínez was born in Buenos Aires, Argentina. She earned a Bachelor of Fine Arts from the Instituto Universitario Nacional del Arte (IUNA) in Buenos Aires, 2008, majoring in printmaking. In 2014, she completed a Master of Fine Arts at the University of British Columbia (UBC) in Vancouver.

== Artistic practice ==
Martínez's artistic practice explores the poetic and political relationships between the body, memory, and place. Through research-based processes, she creates installations and performances that uncover hidden narratives foundational to individual and collective healing.

Her work examines the intersections of embodiment, ritual, pedagogy, and healing. She often engages in site-specific performances and installations that address the invisibility of certain narratives and their historical relation to time and place.

== Career ==
Martínez has participated in various residencies, including:

● The Banff Centre for Arts and Creativity (2010)

● Elsewhere Artist Residency and Museum in Greensboro, North Carolina (2012)

● Hammock Residency in Vancouver

● Strathcona Art Gallery in Vancouver

Her ongoing project, CUERPO collective-body, functions as a site and methodology to explore embodied research and somatic activism, fostering a fluid group of emerging artists and mentors sharing knowledge, movement, and touch.

== Notable exhibitions ==
● Sensorial Visualities: Embodying Together and Alone (2023) at Simon Fraser University Gallery, Burnaby, BC. This project involved movement workshops, listening experiments, and collaborative performances aimed at challenging traditional pedagogical frameworks.

● Re/search Re/surgence (2020) at Or Gallery, Vancouver, BC. This collaborative exhibition was completed with artist Olivia Whetung, featuring the CUERPO Collective's exploration of somatic and spiritual activism through workshops and performances.

● CUERPO (2019) at Or Gallery, Vancouver, BC. This exhibition included a series of workshops and performances focusing on radical presence and embodied research.

● Spill: Response (2019) at Morris and Helen Belkin Art Gallery, Vancouver, BC.

● Love, Loss, and Land (2022) at Open Space, Victoria, BC.

Her work has been exhibited internationally, including at venues such as the Vancouver Art Gallery, Or Gallery, Access Gallery, VIVO Media Arts Centre, Griffin Art Projects, Latitude 53,Grunt gallery, LIVE! Biennale, VIVA! Art Action, Open Space Victoria, CIA (Centro de Investigaciones Artísticas), Palais de Glace, Museo del Grabado de Goya, Centro Cultural General San Martín, Centro Cultural Borges, and Infr'Action Venezia.

== Teaching ==
In addition to her artistic practice, Martínez is a sessional lecturer at UBC's Department of Art History, Visual Art & Theory, where she teaches performance art.

Her teaching practice integrates notions of embodiment, phenomenology, healing, and the decolonization of bodies and institutions. She has also taught at Emily Carr University of Art and Design in Vancouver.
