= Juan Nogueira =

Brazilian boxer (born 1988)

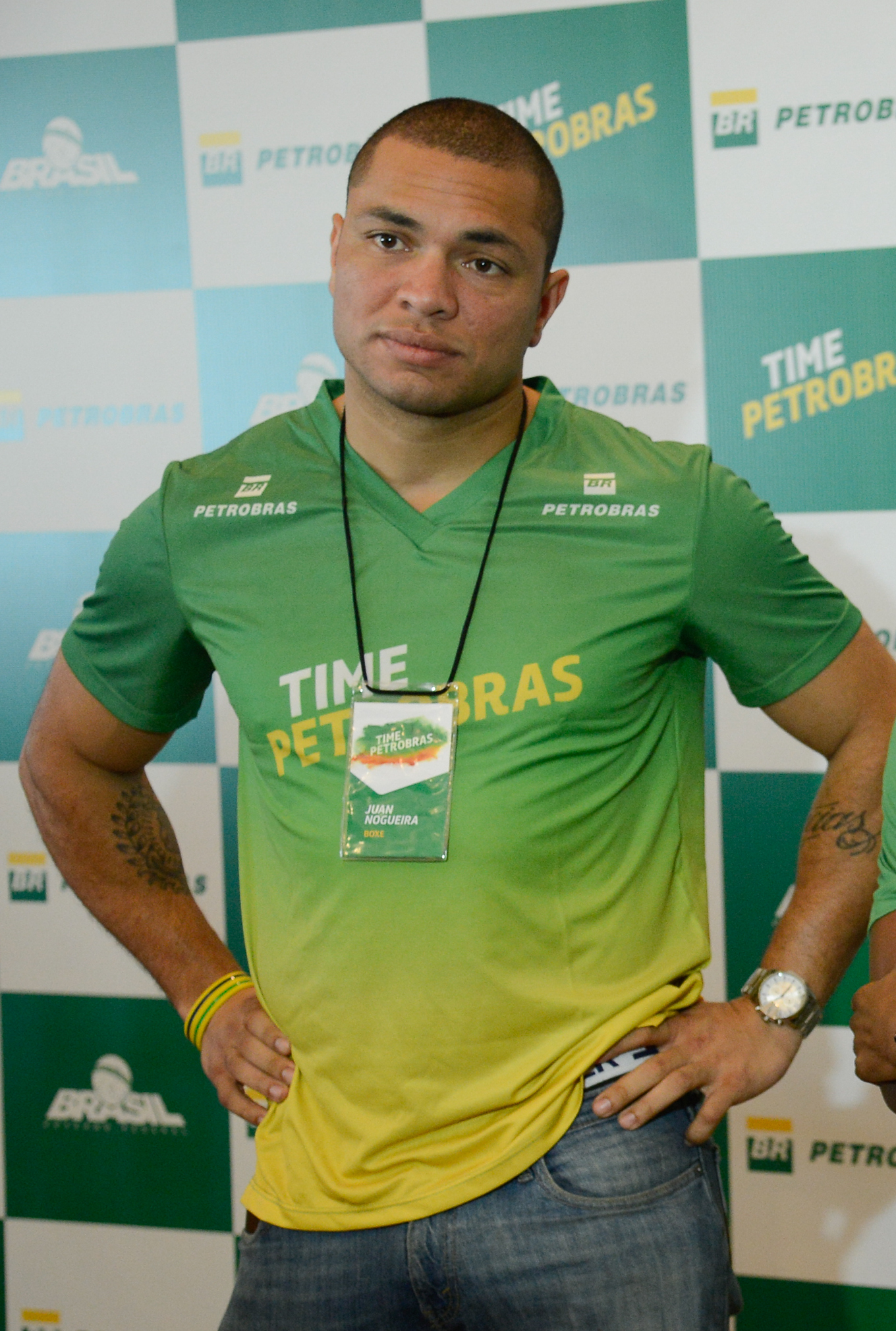
- Juan Nogueira in 2016

Personal information
- Born: 1 May 1988 (age 38) São Paulo, Brazil
- Height: 186 cm (6 ft 1 in)
- Weight: 91 kg (201 lb)

Sport
- Sport: Boxing
- Club: Equipe Tony Boxe
- Coached by: Abel Bokovo; Claudio Aires; João Carlos Barros; Mateus Alves
Medal record
Representing Brazil
South American Games
Bronze medal – third place	2014 Santiago	Heavyweight

Juan Nogueira (born 1 May 1988) is a Brazilian amateur heavyweight boxer who won a bronze medal at the 2014 South American Games. He competed at the 2013 and 2015 world championships and qualified for the 2016 Summer Olympics.
