= Tervel Pulev =

Bulgarian boxer

Tervel Pulev Тервел Пулев
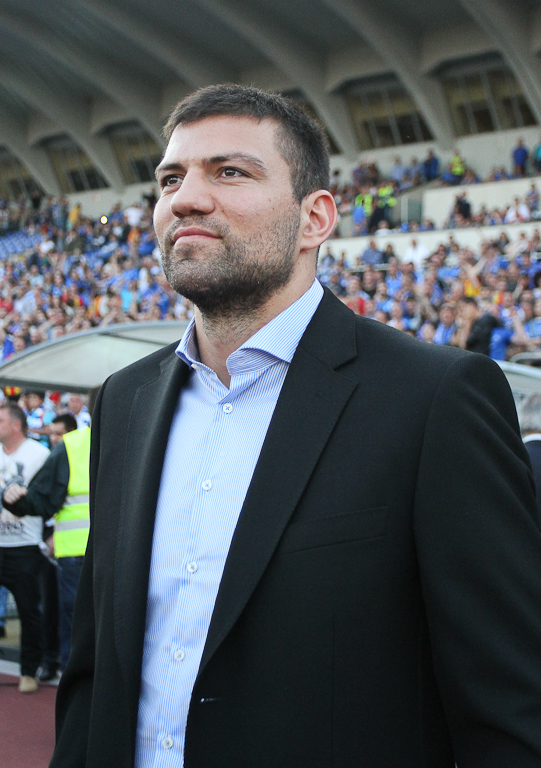

Personal information
- Nationality: Bulgarian
- Born: Tervel Venkov Pulev; 10 January 1983 (age 43) Sofia, Bulgaria
- Height: 1.87 m (6 ft 2 in)
- Weight: Cruiserweight

Boxing career
- Stance: Orthodox

Boxing record
- Total fights: 20
- Wins: 19
- Win by KO: 14
- Losses: 1
Medal record
Men's amateur boxing
Representing Bulgaria
Olympic Games
Bronze medal – third place	2012 London	Heavyweight
European Championships
Silver medal – second place	2010 Moscow	Heavyweight
Silver medal – second place	2011 Ankara	Heavyweight
Bronze medal – third place	2015 Samokov	Heavyweight

Tervel Venkov Pulev (Bulgarian: Тервел Венков Пулев) is a Bulgarian professional boxer. He has held the WBA International cruiserweight title since December 2019 and previously the European Union cruiserweight title in 2018.

== Early life ==
Pulev was born on 10 January 1983 in Sofia, Bulgaria, the youngest son of Hristina and Venko Pulev. He grew up in a big family, one of five children – 3 sisters, and he is the younger brother of professional boxer Kubrat Pulev. As children, the two brothers were trained by their father, who was convinced his sons would succeed in boxing. As a role model their father not only involved them in boxing, but he also influenced them about loving history, reading books and being patriots.

== Amateur career ==
Pulev's first club was CSKA, he won many times the national championship for junior, youth and men. Pulev joins the Bulgarian national representative team and in 1998 participates for the first time in the Youth European Championship in Jurmala, Latvia. During the years he had to defend his presence in the representative team, remaining undefeated from another Bulgarian boxer for the period from 2004 to 2016.

In 2010 Pulev won the silver medal at the European Championship in Moscow, Russia. Same year he participated in the European Cup Tournament in Kharkiv, Ukraine. At the final of the tournament he lost to Oleksandr Usyk. In 2011 Pulev won again the silver medal at the European Championship in Ankara, Turkey. In 2015 Pulev won the bronze medal at the European Championship in Samokov, Bulgaria after he lost to Evgeny Tishchenko at the semi-finals.

During his career we won many golden medals and cups at international tournaments held in: Mostar (2004), Spain (2006), Serbia (2008, 2010, 2011), Dagestan (2009), Bulgaria – Strandja Cup (2011, 2014), Albania (2012), Turkey (2012).

The Tournament in Trabzon, Turkey has been from significant importance for Pulev as it was the last Olympic qualification for Europe zone, by winning Pulev caught the last chance to take the only left quota for the 2012 Summer Olympics

At this Olympic games Pulev won the bronze medal, one of the two Bulgarian olympic medals. Pulev defeated Wang Xuanxuan and Yamil Peralta which secured him a medal. At the semi-finals Pulev lost to Oleksandr Usyk, who won the gold medal.

Pulev was awarded Boxer of the Year in Bulgaria for three consequent years 2010, 2011 and 2012. He has also been nominated three times for Sportsman of the year.

== International Tournaments ==
Year	Competition	Location	Result
2004		Bosnia and Herzegovina	1st
2006		Spain	1st
2008 2010 2011		Serbia	1st
2009		Russia	1st
2010	European Cup	Kharkiv, Ukraine	2nd
2011	Strandja Cup	Pazardzhik, Bulgaria	1st
2012		Albania	1st
2012	Olympic qualifier	Turkey	1st
2012	Boxing at the 2012 Summer Olympics	London, United Kingdom	3rd
2014	Strandja Cup	Sofia, Bulgaria	1st

== Professional career ==
Pulev made his professional debut on 3 December 2016 at Arena Armeec in Sofia, in the Main-Event of a card featuring Kubrat Pulev's win of the World Boxing Association Inter-Continental Heavyweight Title against Samuel Peter, beating Tomislav Rudan by a TKO. Pulev won the following seven fights by KO/TKO in the early rounds. His ninth fight took place in Germany against Valery Brudov and this was the first time for Pulev not to break down the opponent in the very first rounds, but to win by points (Unanimous decision) after the last round. The next three fights took place in Austria, USA and Bulgaria – all three won by KO/TKO. The bout in Bulgaria took place in Arena Armeec on 27 October 2018 and this was Pulev's first title fight – he won the vacant EBU European Union Cruiserweight Title defeating Leonardo Bruzzese by KO. March 2019 was the second time for Pulev to win by points and Unanimous decision against Mitch Williams in USA at the Hangar, Costa Mesa. December 14, 2019 as the main event holder Pulev, outworked and outboxed American cruiserweight Deshon Webster to unanimous decision in Plovdiv, Bulgaria. In this 12 rounds fight Pulev won the WBA International cruiserweight title.

== Professional boxing record ==
20 fights	19 wins	1 loss
By knockout	14	0
By decision	5	1

No.	Result	Record	Opponent	Type	Round, time	Date	Location	Notes
20	Win	19–1	Rolly Lambert	UD	10	30 Mar 2024	Sofia Hall, Sofia, Bulgaria	
19	Win	18–1	Dionardo Minor	UD	6	14 Dec 2023	The Hangar, Costa Mesa, California, United States	
18	Win	17–1	Joel Shojgreen	RTD	3 (8), 3:00	13 Apr 2023	The Hangar, Costa Mesa, California, United States	
17	Loss	16–1	Sergey Kovalev	UD	10	14 May 2022	Kia Forum, Inglewood, California, United States	
16	Win	16–0	Vikapita Meroro	TKO	9 (10), 1:30	29 Jan 2021	Next Door Arena, Dar-Es-Salaam, Tanzania	
15	Win	15–0	DeShon Webster	UD	12	14 Dec 2019	Kolodruma, Plovdiv, Bulgaria	Won vacant WBA International cruiserweight title
14	Win	14–0	Kai Kurzawa	TKO	1 (8), 1:00	8 Nov 2019	Bergisch Gladbach, Germany	
13	Win	13–0	Mitch Williams	UD	6	24 Mar 2019	The Hangar, Costa Mesa, California, US	
12	Win	12–0	Leonardo Bruzzese	KO	2 (12), 0:28	27 Oct 2018	Arena Armeec, Sofia, Bulgaria	Won European Union cruiserweight title
11	Win	11–0	Armando Ancona	TKO	1 (8), 2:06	8 June 2018	Allstate Arena, Rosemont, Illinois US	
10	Win	10–0	Laszlo Penzes	KO	2 (8), 2:10	7 April 2018	Erste Bank Arena, Vienna, Austria	
9	Win	9–0	Valery Brudov	UD	8	10 Mar 2018	Bruno Gehrke Halle, Berlin, Germany	
8	Win	8–0	Scott Futrell	TKO	1 (4), 2:41	3 Mar 2018	The Belvedere, Chicago, Illinois, US	
7	Win	7–0	Artsiom Charniakevich	TKO	2 (8), 2:55	23 Dec 2017	Boxhalle Marzahn, Berlin, Germany	
6	Win	6–0	Mikheil Khutsishvili	TKO	1 (8), 1:30	18 Nov 2017	Sporthalle Zur Kuhdrift 1, Neustadt-Glewe, Germany	
5	Win	5–0	Artem Redko	TKO	3 (8), 1:32	11 Nov 2017	Werner-Seelenbinder-Sportpark, Berlin, Germany	
4	Win	4–0	Drazen Zanjanin	KO	2 (8), 1:18	30 Jun 2017	Werner-Seelenbinder-Sportpark, Berlin, Germany	
3	Win	3–0	Jakub Wojcik	TKO	3 (6), 2:35	28 Apr 2017	Arena Armeec, Sofia, Bulgaria	
2	Win	2–0	Ramazi Gogichashvili	KO	1 (6), 2:52	8 Apr 2017	Werner-Seelenbinder-Sportpark, Berlin, Germany	
1	Win	1–0	Tomislav Rudan	TKO	3 (6), 0:52	3 Dec 2016	Arena Armeec, Sofia, Bulgaria	

== Personal life ==
Tervel Pulev has two sons Kaloyan (born in 2008) and Asparuh (born in 2016) with Diana Nenova, Bulgarian volleyball player and member of the national team.

Pulev has a Мaster's degree graduate of the National Sports Academy (NSA), in 2019 he decided to enroll in the PhD program of the academy. In 2018 Pulev became Master of Laws, graduating from Sofia University "St. Kliment Ohridski ". Pulev owns a sport center called "Sport Center Pulev" located in Sofia.
