= Alexander Povernov =

German boxer

Medal record

Representing Germany

Men's boxing
| Bronze medal – third place | 2005 Mianyang | Heavyweight |

European Championships
| Bronze medal – third place | 2006 Plovdiv | Heavyweight |

European Union Championships
| Bronze medal – third place | 2005 Cagliari | Heavyweight |

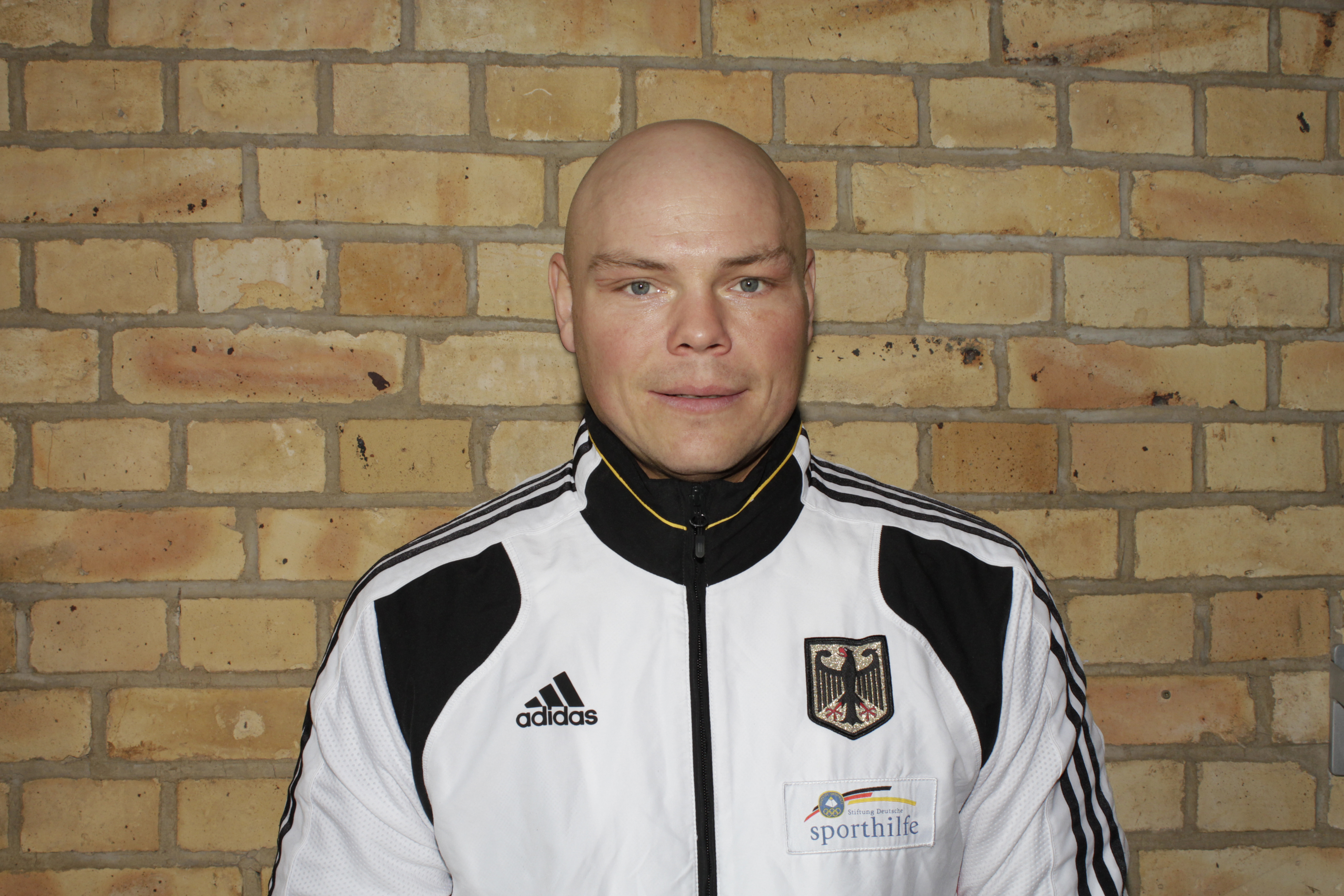

Alexander Povernov (born 17 February 1978) is a German former amateur boxer who won a heavyweight bronze medal at the 2005 World Championships.

== Career ==
The hard punching Povernov could win the German Championships at heavyweights with 201 lb/91 kg limit in 2000, 2004, 2005 and 2006. One of his main opponents was Stefan Köber, brother of Sebastian Köber, who beat him on points in 2003 but whom he KOd 2004.

At the 2004 European Championships he lost in the first round against Kubrat Pulev.

At the 2005 World Championships he lost his semi final to eventual winner Aleksandr Alekseyev and won bronze.

At the 2006 European Championships he beat Clemente Russo 30:21 but lost to Roman Romanchuk and again won bronze.

At the 2007 World Championships he beat Polish Krzysztof Zimnoch 18:10 but exited early against Italian surprise winner Clemente Russo 5:17. He failed to qualify for the 2008 Olympics.
