= Boxing at the 2012 Summer Olympics – Men's heavyweight =

Boxing competitions

Men's heavyweight boxing at the Games of the XXX Olympiad
- Venue: ExCeL Exhibition Centre
- Date: 1–11 August 2012
- Competitors: 15 from 15 nations

Medalists
1st place, gold medalist(s)		Oleksandr Usyk	Ukraine
2nd place, silver medalist(s)		Clemente Russo	Italy
3rd place, bronze medalist(s)		Tervel Pulev	Bulgaria
3rd place, bronze medalist(s)		Teymur Mammadov	Azerbaijan

The men's heavyweight boxing competition at the 2012 Olympic Games in London was held from 1 to 11 August at the ExCeL Exhibition Centre.

Fifteen boxers from 15 nations competed.

== Competition format ==
The competition consisted of a single-elimination tournament. Bronze medals were awarded to both semi-final losers. Bouts were three rounds of three minutes each.

== Schedule ==
All times are British Summer Time (UTC+1)

Date	Time	Round
Wednesday 1 August 2012	14:30 & 21:30	Round of 16
Sunday 5 August 2012	21:30	Quarter-finals
Friday 10 August 2012	15:30	Semi-finals
Saturday 11 August 2012	21:30	Final

== Results ==
Round of 16
Artur Beterbiyev (RUS)	10+
Michael Hunter (USA)	10
Tervel Pulev (BUL)	10
Wang Xuanxuan (CHN)	7
Yamil Peralta (ARG)	13
Chouaib Bouloudinat (ALG)	5
Teymur Mammadov (AZE)	12
Jai Opetaia (AUS)	11
Julio Castillo (ECU)	12
Siarhei Karneyeu (BLR)	21
José Larduet (CUB)
Ali Mazaheri (IRI)	DSQ
Tumba Silva (ANG)	WO
Clemente Russo (ITA)

Quarter-finals
Oleksandr Usyk (UKR)	17
Artur Beterbiyev (RUS)	13
Tervel Pulev (BUL)	13
Yamil Peralta (ARG)	10
Teymur Mammadov (AZE)	19+
Siarhei Karneyeu (BLR)	19
José Larduet (CUB)	10
Clemente Russo (ITA)	12

Semi-finals
Oleksandr Usyk (UKR)	21
Tervel Pulev (BUL)	5
Teymur Mammadov (AZE)	13
Clemente Russo (ITA)	15

Final
Oleksandr Usyk (UKR)	14
Clemente Russo (ITA)	11
