= Tumba Silva =

Angolan boxer (born 1986)

Tumba Silva (born April 20, 1986 in Luanda) is an Angolan boxer. (Note: "Tumba Silva". London 2012. The London Organising Committee of the Olympic Games and Paralympic Games Limited.) At the 2012 Summer Olympics, he competed in the Men's heavyweight, but lost in a walkover to Clemente Russo in the first round after missing the weigh-in.
