= Mario Heredia =

Mexican boxer

Personal information
- Nickname: Chabelo
- Born: 12 December 1992 (age 33) Ciudad Juárez, Chihuahua, Mexico
- Height: 1.87 m (6 ft 2 in)
- Weight: Heavyweight

Boxing career
- Reach: 191 cm (75 in)
- Stance: Orthodox

Boxing record
- Total fights: 28
- Wins: 18
- Win by KO: 14
- Losses: 8
- Draws: 1
- No contests: 1

Mario Heredia (born 12 December 1992) is a Mexican professional boxer who once held the WBC FECOMBOX heavyweight title. As an amateur, he represented Mexico at the 2011 World Amateur Boxing Championships.

== Amateur career ==
Heredia had an amateur record of 47-5 and was a two-time Mexican National Olympics gold medalists. He represented Mexico in the World Series Boxing, he even scored an upset knockout over undefeated Donovan Dennis. Heredia also competed at the 2011 Pan American Games.

== Professional career ==
On May 14, 2012, Heredia beat the veteran José Carlos Rodríguez by K.O. in the second round. This bout was held at the Arandas Municipal Auditorium in Arandas, Jalisco, Mexico.

== Professional boxing record ==
28 fights	18 wins	8 losses
By knockout	15	7
By decision	3	1
Draws	1	
No contests	1	

No.	Result	Record	Opponent	Type	Round, time	Date	Location	Notes
28	NC	18–8–1 (1)	Kingsley Ibeh	NC	? (10)	7 Sep 2024	Casas Grandes, Chihuahua, Mexico	Ibeh refused to fight
27	Win	18–8–1	Ramón Olivas Echeverría	TKO	3 (8), 1:28	16 Mar 2024	Nogales, Sonora, Mexico	
26	Win	17–8–1	Ernesto Zamora	KO	1 (6), 1:39	30 Jul 2021	Domo Binacional, Nogales, Sonora, Mexico	
25	Loss	16–8–1	Alexander Flores	TKO	6 (10), 1:33	7 Nov 2019	Casino Del Sol, Tucson, Arizona, U.S.	
24	Loss	16–7–1	Filip Hrgović	TKO	3 (10), 0:43	24 Aug 2019	Centro de Usos Múltiples, Hermosillo, Mexico	For WBC International heavyweight title
23	Win	16–6–1	Samuel Peter	SD	8	13 Apr 2019	Boardwalk Hall, Atlantic City, New Jersey, U.S.	
22	Draw	15–6–1	David Torres García	TD	1 (6), 1:25	16 Jun 2018	Gimnasio Beto's Boxing, Ciudad Juárez, Mexico	Accidental headbutt and the doctors determines Torres García can not continue
21	Win	15–6	Alfredo Sánchez	TKO	1 (6), 1:28	16 Mar 2018	Plaza Tinaco, Empalme, Mexico	
20	Loss	14–6	George Arias	RTD	5 (8), 3:00	14 Oct 2017	Barclays Center, Brooklyn, New York, U.S.	
19	Win	14–5	Ramón Olivas Echeverría	TKO	1 (8), 2:30	1 Sep 2017	Gimnasio Solidaridad, Hermosillo, Mexico	
18	Loss	13–5	Jonathan Rice	KO	3 (4), 2:02	11 Mar 2017	DoubleTree Hotel, Orange, California, U.S.	
17	Loss	13–4	Jonathan Rice	KO	5 (6), 1:31	18 Nov 2016	DoubleTree Hotel, Ontario, California, U.S.	
16	Loss	13–3	LaRon Mitchell	UD	8	26 Aug 2016	Omega Products International, Corona, California, U.S.	
15	Loss	13–2	Andrey Fedosov	TKO	6 (10), 1:33	11 Jun 2016	Turning Stone Resort Casino, Verona, New York, U.S.	For vacant WBA Fedelatin heavyweight title
14	Win	13–1	Saúl Montana	KO	2 (12), 1:05	5 Dec 2015	Gimnasio Solidaridad, Hermosillo, Mexico	Won vacant WBC FECOMBOX heavyweight title
13	Win	12–1	Jesús Martínez Torres	TKO	2 (6), 1:29	23 Oct 2015	Gimnasio Solidaridad, Hermosillo, Mexico	
12	Win	11–1	Jorge Valenzuela	KO	2 (6), 2:16	5 Sep 2015	Gimnasio Solidaridad, Hermosillo, Mexico	
11	Win	10–1	Juan Gómez	TKO	1 (4), 2:50	11 Jul 2015	CUM Aguaprieta, Agua Prieta, Mexico	
10	Win	9–1	Roy McCrary	UD	4	24 Oct 2014	DoubleTree Hotel, Ontario, California, U.S.	
9	Win	8–1	Ronald Baca	TKO	1 (4), 1:07	10 Oct 2014	County Coliseum, El Paso, Texas, U.S.	
8	Win	7–1	Guillermo Herrera Campos	KO	1 (6), 1:11	9 Mar 2013	Deportivo del Sindicato del Metro, Mexico City, Mexico	
7	Win	6–1	Esteban Sosa Vázquez	KO	1 (6), 0:30	23 Feb 2013	Deportico del Sindicato del Metro, Mexico City, Mexico	
6	Win	5–1	Wilfrido Leal	KO	1 (6)	15 Dec 2012	Deportivo del Sindicato del Metro, Mexico City, Mexico	
5	Loss	4–1	Wilfrido Leal	RTD	2 (6), 3:00	11 Aug 2012	Deportico del Sindicato del Metro, Mexico City, Mexico	
4	Win	4–0	Carlos Sandoval	SD	6	12 May 2012	Hotel Presidente Intercontinental, Polando, Mexico	
3	Win	3–0	José Carlos Rodríguez	KO	2 (8), 1:24	14 Apr 2012	Arandas Municipal Auditorium, Arandas, Mexico	
2	Win	2–0	Alejandro de la Torre	KO	1 (6)	17 Mar 2012	Deportivo del Sindicato del Metro, Mexico City, Mexico	
1	Win	1–0	Jesús Cárdenas	KO	1 (6), 1:02	25 Feb 2012	Arena México, Mexico City, Mexico	
