= Siarhei Karneyeu =

Belarusian boxer (born 1988)

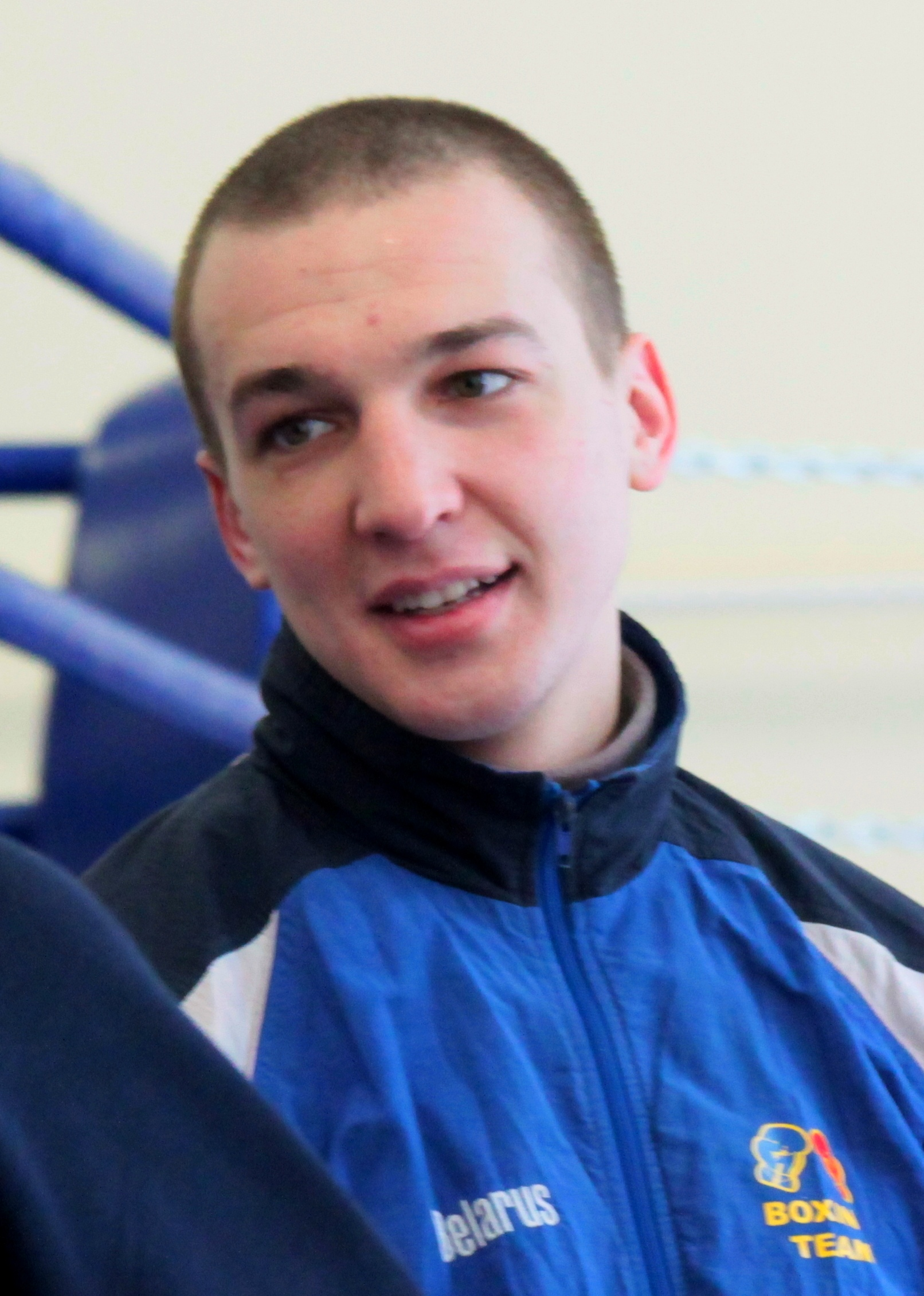
- Karneyeu in 2011

Medal record

Men's amateur boxing

Representing Belarus

World Amateur Championships
Bronze medal – third place	2011 Baku	Heavyweight

European Amateur Championships
Silver medal – second place	2008 Liverpool	Heavyweight

Siarhei Karneyeu (born 24 November 1988 in Belarusian SSR) is a Belarusian amateur boxer in the Heavyweight (201 lbs limit) division who won bronze the 2011 World Amateur Boxing Championships.

== Career ==
He won a silver medal at the 2008 European Championships in the -81 kg division.

At the 2011 World Championships, he defeated Deivi Julio, Michał Olaś (POL), Julio Castillo (ECU) and Chouaib Bouloudinat (ALG) before losing to eventual winner Oleksandr Usyk (UKR). With it, he qualified for the 2012 Olympics.

At the 2011 European Championships he lost to Johann Witt 26:28.

At the 2012 Olympics he beat Julio Castillo but lost to Teymur Mammadov.
