= Wang Xuanxuan =

Chinese boxer

Personal information
- Full name: Wang Xuanxuan
- Nationality: China
- Born: January 26, 1990 (age 36) Changzhou, Jiangsu, China
- Weight: 91 kg (201 lb)

Sport
- Sport: Boxing
- Weight class: Heavyweight
Medal record
World Amateur Championships
| Bronze medal – third place | 2011 Baku | Heavyweight |

Wang Xuanxuan (b January 26, 1990, Changzhou) is a Chinese heavyweight amateur boxer who won Bronze at the 2011 World Amateur Boxing Championships (results).

At the 2011 World Amateur Boxing Championships he beat three Asian boxers before losing to Teymur Mammadov, his result meant he qualified for the Olympics 2012. At the Chinese Championships he defeated Wang Jianzheng.

At the 2012 Olympics he lost his first bout to Bulgarian Tervel Pulev 7:10.
