= Clemente Russo =

Italian boxer (born 1982)

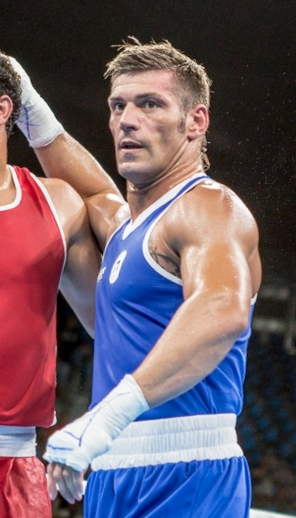
- Russo at the 2016 Olympics

Personal information
- Born: 27 July 1982 (age 44) Caserta, Italy
- Height: 1.81 m (5 ft 11 1/2 in)
- Weight: 91 kg (201 lb)

Sport
- Sport: Amateur boxing
- Club: Fiamme Oro; Milano Thunder; Fiamme Azzurre (2012-)
- Coached by: Giulio Coletta; Michele Caldarella
Medal record
Representing Italy
Event	1st	2nd	3rd
Olympic Games	0	2	0
World Championships	2	0	0
EU Championships	1	1	0
Mediterranean Games	1	0	0
Total	6	4	3
Olympic Games
Silver medal – second place	2008 Beijing	Heavyweight
Silver medal – second place	2012 London	Heavyweight
World Amateur Championships
Gold medal – first place	2007 Chicago	Heavyweight
Gold medal – first place	2013 Almaty	Heavyweight
EU Amateur Championships
Gold medal – first place	2005 Cagliari	Heavyweight
Silver medal – second place	2007 Dublin	Heavyweight
Mediterranean Games
Gold medal – first place	2005 Almeíra	Heavyweight

Clemente Russo (born 27 July 1982) is an Italian former amateur boxer, best known for winning gold at the 2007 and 2013 World Amateur Boxing Championships at heavyweight (201 lbs limit). He boxed for the Italia Thunder team in the World Series of Boxing league.

== Career ==
Russo qualified for the 2004 Summer Olympics by finishing in second place at the 1st AIBA European 2004 Olympic Qualifying Tournament in Plovdiv, Bulgaria. At the Games, Russo, who hails from Campania, fought at light heavyweight. He ran right into eventual winner Andre Ward from the USA and was eliminated early.

He moved up to the 201 lbs category and exited early at the 2005 World Championships and the 2006 European Championships.

In 2007, he lost the European Championships final to Elias Pavlidis, at the World Championships, he easily beat Englishman Daniel Price, 2005 medalist Alexander Povernov (PTS 17–5) and won the quarterfinals against Milorad Gajović (Montenegro) to qualify for Beijing. He beat Chinese Yushan Nijiati to reach the finals, where he edged out Russian top favourite Rakhim Chakkhiev 7–6.

In the 2008 Olympics he won the silver medal, losing the final round and so the competition to Rakhim Chakkhiev. He carried the Italian flag at the Beijing closing ceremony.

In the World Series of Boxing, he boxed for the Italia Thunder team. He received the "Winner WSB Heavyweight Individual World Champion 2011" and "Winner WSB Team World Champion 2012" awards.

Outside of his athletic career, in 2011 Russo debuted as an actor in the drama film Tatanka.

At the 2012 Summer Olympics, Russo again won the silver medal, losing the final to Oleksandr Usyk.

In 2019, he was the Italian flag bearer at the European Games in Minsk.

Russo retired from boxing on 22 July 2021 after unsuccessfully requesting a wild card to compete at the 2020 Olympic Games in Tokyo.

== Personal life ==
Russo worked as a police officer. He credits boxing with teaching him English and self-discipline.

He married former international judo competitor Laura Maddaloni in 2008, they have three daughters. Since retiring from boxing, Russo has participated in a number of reality shows on Italian television, including Big Brother VIP in 2016 and as a correspondent for Le Iene. In 2022, he appeared with his wife on the Italian reality show L'isola dei famosi.

== World Amateur Championships results ==
2003

- Defeated Stefan Balint (Romania) 15–10
- Lost to Magomed Aripgadzhiev (Belarus) 4–14

2005

- Lost to Jasur Matchanov (Uzbekistan) 13–16

2007

- Defeated Danny Price (England) 14–5
- Defeated Lukas Viktora (Czech Republic) 17–6
- Defeated Alexander Povernov (Germany) 17–5
- Defeated Milorad Gajović (Montenegro) 15–3
- Defeated Yushan Nijiati (China) 19–11
- Defeated Rakhim Chakkhiev (Russia) 7–6

== Olympic results ==
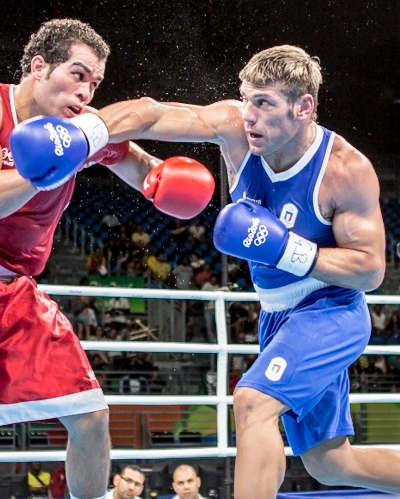
Russo at the 2016 Olympics

2004 (as a light heavyweight)

- Lost to Andre Ward (United States) 17-9

2008 (as a heavyweight)

- Defeated Viktar Zuyev (Belarus) 7–1
- Defeated Oleksandr Usyk (Ukraine) 7–4
- Defeated Deontay Wilder (United States) 7–1
- Lost to Rakhim Chakkhiev (Russia) 2–4

2012 (as a heavyweight)

- Defeated Tumba Silva (Angola)
- Defeated Jose Larduet (Cuba)
- Defeated Teymur Mammadov (Azerbaijan) 7–1
- Lost to Oleksandr Usyk (Ukraine)

2016 (as a heavyweight)

- Defeated Hassen Chaktami (Tunisia) 3-0
- Lost to Evgeny Tishchenko (Russia) 0–3
