= Samir El-Mais =

Canadian boxer

Personal information
- Nickname: Sweet Sammy
- Nationality: Canada
- Born: 10 September 1980 (age 45) Abu Dhabi, UAE
- Height: 185 cm (6 ft 1 in)
- Weight: 91 kg (201 lb)

Sport
- Sport: Boxing
- Weight class: Heavyweight
Medal record
Men's Boxing
Representing Canada
Commonwealth Games
Gold medal – first place	2014 Glasgow	Heavyweight
Pan American Games
Bronze medal – third place	2015 Toronto	Heavyweight

Samir El-Mais (born 10 September 1980), nicknamed "Sweet Sammy", is an Abu Dhabi-born Canadian heavyweight boxer from Windsor, Ontario. Relatively unknown, El Mais captured the Canadian Heavyweight Championship on February 24, 2010, defeating Shavar Henry 9–4 in Halifax, Nova Scotia. He competed at the 2010 Commonwealth Games in the heavyweight division where he won his first bout against Kevin Evans of Wales and eventually lost in his quarter-final bout to Stephen Simmons of Scotland.

At the 2011 World Amateur Boxing Championships he defeated Yamil Peralta but had to pull out of his next fight. At the Olympic qualifier he beat Deivi Julio but lost the rematch with Peralta
