= Teymur Mammadov =

Azerbaijani boxer (born 1993)

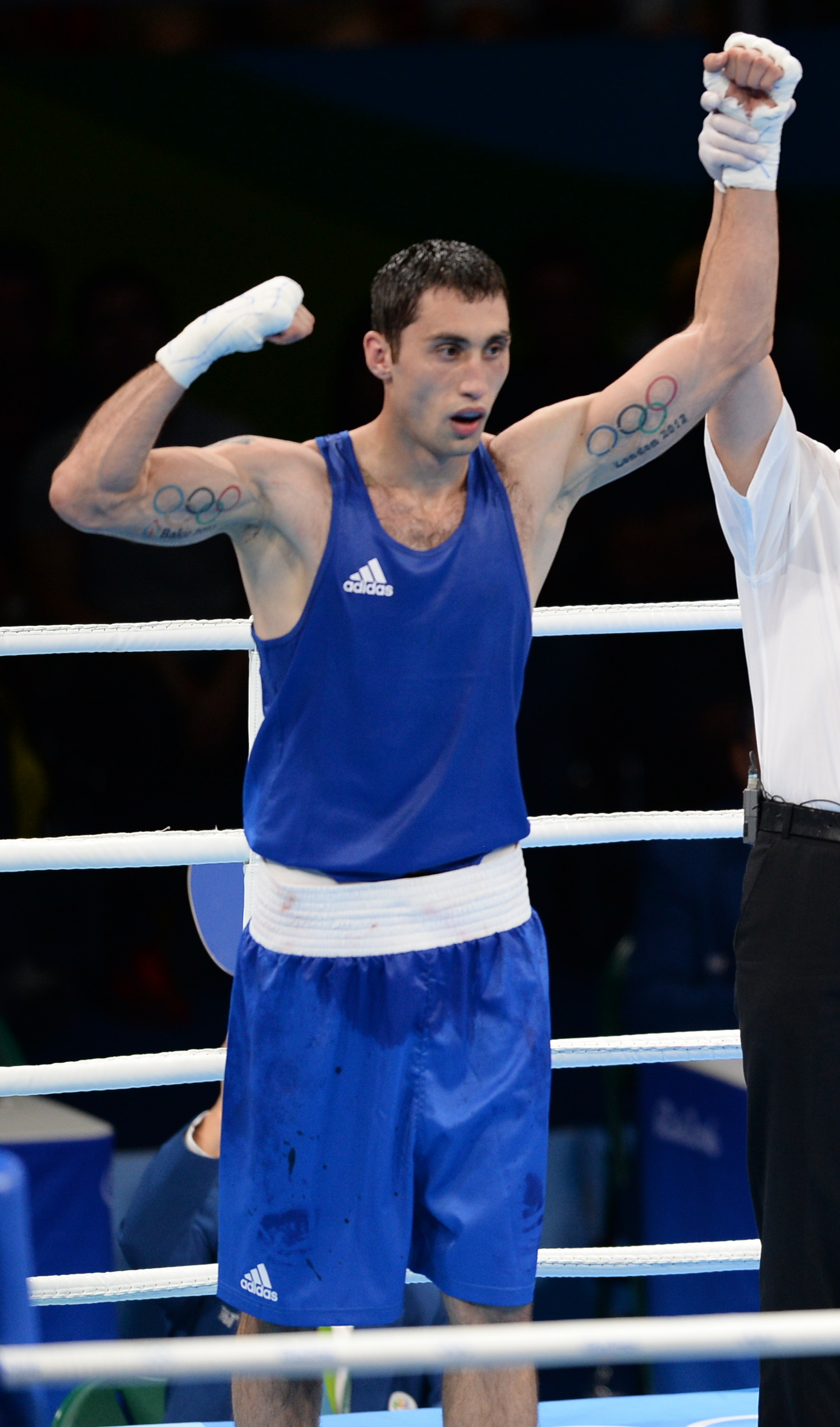
- Mammadov at the 2016 Olympics

Personal information
- Full name: Teymur Fuzuli oglu Mammadov
- Nationality: Azerbaijani
- Born: 11 January 1993 (age 33) Baku, Azerbaijan
- Education: Azerbaijan State Academy of Physical Culture and Sport
- Height: 196 cm (6 ft 5 in)

Sport
- Sport: Boxing
- Club: Rabita SC
- Coached by: Ilham Alimzanov
Medal record
Men's amateur boxing
Representing Azerbaijan
Olympic Games
Bronze medal – third place	2012 London	−91 kg
World Amateur Championships
Silver medal – second place	2011 Baku	−91 kg
Bronze medal – third place	2013 Almaty	−91 kg
European Games
Gold medal – first place	2015 Baku	−81 kg
European Amateur Championships
Gold medal – first place	2011 Ankara	−91 kg
Silver medal – second place	2013 Minsk	−91 kg
Islamic Solidarity Games
Gold medal – first place	2017 Baku	−91 kg

Teymur Mammadov (born 11 January 1993) is a heavyweight amateur boxer from Azerbaijan. He won a bronze medal at the 2012 Olympics and reached quarterfinals at the 2016 Games, where he served as the flag bearer for Azerbaijan during the Parade of Nations.

== Career ==
Mammadov won silver at the 2011 World Amateur Boxing Championships, losing to Oleksandr Usyk and gold at the 2011 European Amateur Boxing Championships. At the London 2012 Olympic Games Mammadov won a bronze medal after a controversial decision to award him a victory over Siarhei Karneyeu. He had already defeated Jai Opetaia but lost to Clemente Russo in the semi-final.

In 2013 Mammadov reached the finals at the 2013 European Amateur Boxing Championships in Minsk and won the silver medal. He won a bronze medal at the 2013 AIBA World Boxing Championships after losing to Clemente Russo again.

By 2015 Mammadov moved down from the heavyweight (91 kg) to light heavyweight division (81 kg), winning a gold medal at the 2015 European Games. At the 2016 Summer Olympics, he was defeated in the quarterfinals by the eventual silver medalist Adilbek Niyazymbetov of Kazakhstan. Mammadov was the flag bearer for Azerbaijan during the Parade of Nations.

Olympic Games
Preceded by Elnur Mammadli	Flagbearer for Azerbaijan; Rio de Janeiro 2016	Succeeded by Rustam Orujov
