= Julio Castillo (boxer) =

Ecuadorian boxer (born 1988)

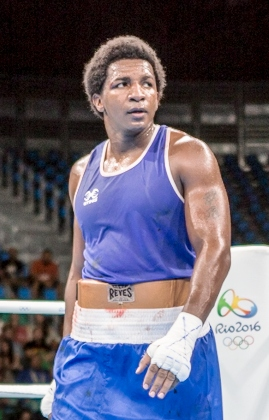
- Castillo at the 2016 Olympics

Personal information
- Born: 10 May 1988 (age 38) Durán, Guayas, Ecuador
- Height: 183 cm (6 ft 0 in)
- Weight: 91 kg (201 lb)

Boxing career
- Weight class: Heavyweight, Light heavyweight
- Stance: Southpaw

Boxing record
- Total fights: 53
- Wins: 32
- Win by KO: 1
- Losses: 21
- Draws: 0
- No contests: 0
Medal record
Men's boxing
Representing Ecuador
World Championships
Silver medal – second place	2019 Yekaterinburg	Heavyweight
Pan American Games
Silver medal – second place	2011 Guadalajara	Heavyweight
Silver medal – second place	2019 Lima	Heavyweight
Bronze medal – third place	2007 Rio	Light heavyweight
Bronze medal – third place	2023 Santiago	Heavyweight
Pan American Championship
Bronze medal – third place	2017 Tegucigalpa	Heavyweight
South American Games
Gold medal – first place	2010 Medellín	Heavyweight
Gold medal – first place	2022 Asunción	Heavyweight
Silver medal – second place	2018 Cochabamba	Heavyweight
Bronze medal – third place	2006 Buenos Aires	Light heavyweight

Julio César Castillo Torres (Note: In this Spanish name, the first or paternal surname is Castillo and the second or maternal family name is Torres.) (born 10 May 1988) is an Ecuadorian amateur boxer. He won two medals at the Pan American Games: a bronze in 2007 and a silver in 2011.

== Career ==
At the 2006 South American Games, Castillo lost to Hamilton Ventura in the semifinals and ended up with a bronze medal. At the 2007 Pan American Games, he won 15:5 against Carlos Negron, but lost to the eventual winner Eleider Alvarez 8:10 in the semifinal. He failed to qualify for the 2008 Summer Olympics and went up to heavyweight, winning a silver at the 2011 Pan American Games.

At the 2012 Olympic qualifier, he lost 8:14 to Michael Hunter, but qualified for the Olympics on the strength of "two wins vs no-names". He lost in the first bout at both the 2012 and 2016 Olympics.

He represented Ecuador at the 2020 Summer Olympics.

== Notes ==
Olympic Games
Preceded by Klaus Jungbluth	Flag bearer for Ecuador; Tokyo 2020; With: Alexandra Escobar	Succeeded by Sarah Escobar
