= 2016 Summer Olympics =

Multi-sport event in Rio de Janeiro, Brazil

Games of the XXXI Olympiad
- Emblem of the 2016 Summer Olympics (Note: The official logo of the 2016 Summer Olympics was made in 3D design, by Brazilian design company Tátil Design; it was inspired by Brazil's rich history of festivals and its colorful people, and also symbolizes energy, passion and unity. The selected colours derived from the city's environment, symbolises the sun and Brazil's happy warm and nature.)
- Location: Rio de Janeiro, Brazil
- Motto: A New World (Portuguese: Um mundo novo)
- Nations: 207 (including IOA and EOR teams)
- Athletes: 11,180 (6,146 men, 5,034 women)
- Events: 306 in 28 sports (42 disciplines)
- Opening: 5 August 2016
- Closing: 21 August 2016
- Opened by: Acting president Michel Temer (Note: Incumbent president Dilma Rousseff suspended from duties due to impeachment.)
- Closed by: IOC President Thomas Bach
- Cauldron: Vanderlei Cordeiro de Lima
- Stadium: Estádio do Maracanã

The 2016 Summer Olympics (Portuguese: Jogos Olímpicos de Verão de 2016), (Note: The Brazilian Portuguese pronunciation is [ˈʒɔɡuz oˈlĩpikuz dʒi veˈɾɐ̃w dʒi ˈdojz ˈmiw i dʒizeˈsejs], in Brazil's standard pronunciation.) officially the Games of the XXXI Olympiad (Portuguese: Jogos da XXXI Olimpíada) and officially branded as Rio 2016, were an international multi-sport event held from 5 to 21 August 2016 in Rio de Janeiro, Brazil, with preliminary events in some sports beginning on 3 August. Rio de Janeiro was announced as the host city at the 121st IOC Session in Copenhagen, Denmark, on 2 October 2009.

11,238 athletes from 207 nations took part in the 2016 Games, including first-time entrants Kosovo, South Sudan, and the Refugee Olympic Team. With 306 sets of medals, the Games featured 28 Olympic sports, including rugby sevens and golf, which were added to the Olympic program in 2009. These sporting events took place at 33 venues in the host city and at five separate venues in the Brazilian cities of São Paulo, Belo Horizonte, Salvador, Brasília, and Manaus.

These were the first Olympic Games to be held in South America, as well as the first to be held in a Portuguese-speaking country, the first summer edition to be held entirely in the host country's winter season, the first since 1968 to be held in Latin America, and the first since 2000 to be held in the Southern Hemisphere. These were also the first Summer Olympics to take place under the International Olympic Committee (IOC) presidency of Thomas Bach. The games were opened by acting president of Brazil (and later president), Michel Temer and closed by Bach.

The United States topped the medal table, winning the most gold medals (46) and the highest number of medals overall (121); the U.S. team also won its 1,000th Summer Olympic gold medal. Great Britain finished second and the only country to increase its tally of medals in the Summer Olympiad immediately after being the host nation. China finished third. Host nation Brazil won seven gold medals and 19 total medals, its best result at any Olympics, finishing in thirteenth place. Bahrain, Fiji, Ivory Coast, Jordan, Kosovo, Puerto Rico, Singapore, Tajikistan, and Vietnam all won their first gold medals, as did the group of Independent Olympic Athletes (from Kuwait).

== Bidding process ==
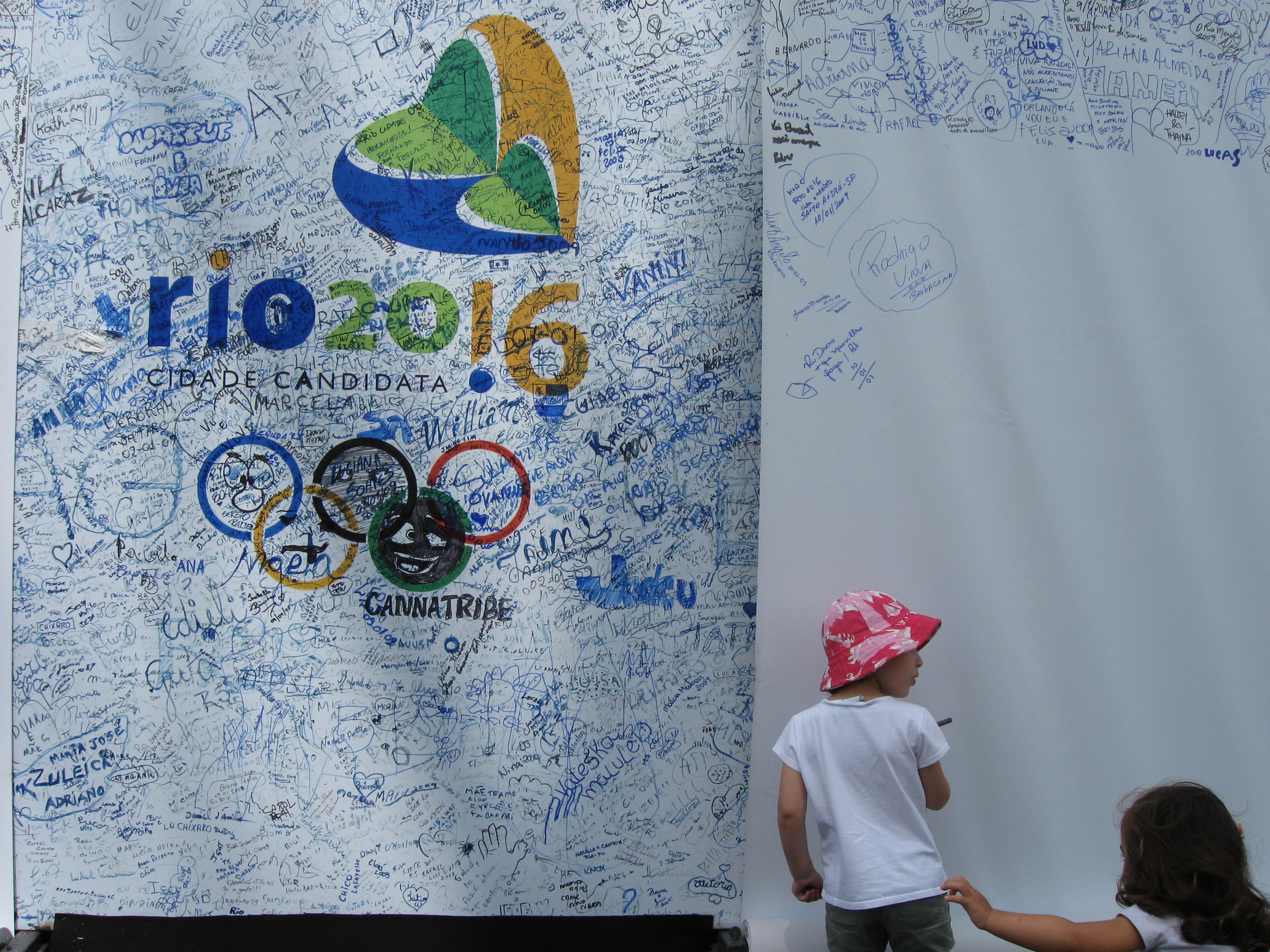
A young girl adding her signature in support of Rio de Janeiro's candidacy

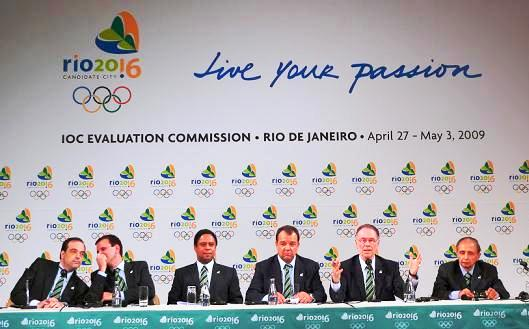
The bid committee, led by Carlos Arthur Nuzman, giving a press conference.

The bidding process for the 2016 Summer Olympics was officially launched on 16 May 2007. The first step for each city was to submit an initial application to the International Olympic Committee by 13 September 2007, confirming their intention to bid. Completed official bid files containing answers to a 25-question IOC form were to be submitted by each city by the deadline of 14 January 2008. On 4 June 2008, two months before the Beijing Olympics, four candidate cities were chosen for the shortlist: Chicago, Madrid, Rio de Janeiro, and Tokyo, which had already hosted the Summer Olympics in 1964. Three cities—Baku, Doha, and Prague—failed to reach the candidature phase.

Nawal El Moutawakel of Morocco headed the 10-member Evaluation Commission, having also chaired the evaluation commission for the 2012 Summer Olympics bids, which was awarded to London, United Kingdom. The commission made on-site inspections in the second quarter of 2009. They issued a comprehensive technical appraisal for IOC members on 2 September, one month before the elections.

Many safeguards were put in place to prevent bidding cities from communicating with or directly influencing the 115 IOC members eligible to vote in the elections. For example, cities could not invite any IOC member to visit, nor could they send anything that could be construed as a gift. Nonetheless, bidding cities invested large sums in their PR and media programs to indirectly influence the IOC members by garnering domestic support and backing from sports media and general international media.

Ultimately, you are communicating with just 115 people and each one has influencers and pressure groups but you are still speaking to no more than about 1,500 people, perhaps 5,000 in the broadest sense. It is not just about getting ads out there but it is about a targeted and very carefully planned campaign.

— Jon Tibbs, a consultant on the Tokyo bid

The final voting was held in Copenhagen on 2 October 2009, with Madrid and Rio de Janeiro considered favorites to secure the Games. Chicago was eliminated after the first round of voting, and Tokyo after the second (The latter city would eventually be awarded the 2020 Summer Olympics in 2013). Rio de Janeiro took a significant lead over Madrid, heading into the final round; the lead was held, and Rio de Janeiro was announced as host of the 2016 Summer Olympics.

2016 Summer Olympics bidding results
City	Country	Round		
City	Country	1	2	3
Rio de Janeiro	Brazil	26	46	66
Madrid	Spain	28	29	32
Tokyo	Japan	22	20	—
Chicago	United States	18	—	—

== Development and preparations ==
On 26 June 2011, it was reported on Around The Rings that Roderlei Generali, the COO of the Rio de Janeiro Organizing Committee for the Olympic Games, resigned just one year after taking the job at ROOC. This came just five months after CCO Flávio Pestana quit for personal reasons. Pestana withdrew later during the 2012 Summer Paralympics, and Renato Ciuchin was then appointed as COO.

=== Venues and infrastructure ===
Venues of the 2016 Summer Olympics

Events took place at eighteen existing venues, nine new venues constructed specifically for the Games, and seven temporary venues.

For the events held in Rio de Janeiro, each event was held in one of four geographically segregated Olympic clusters–Barra, Copacabana, Deodoro, and Maracanã–as was done for the 2007 Pan American Games. Several of the venues were located at the Barra Cluster Olympic Park. Nearly half of the athletes could reach their venues in less than 10 minutes, and almost 75 per cent could do so in less than 25 minutes. Of the 34 competition venues, eight underwent some permanent works, seven were totally temporary and nine were constructed as permanent legacy venues.

The largest venue at the Games in terms of seating capacity was the 75,000-seat Maracanã Stadium, which served as the ceremonies venue and site of the football finals. The second largest stadium was the 60,000-seat Estádio Olímpico Nilton Santos (formerly João Havelange during the Games), which hosted track and field events. The athletes' village was said to be the largest in Olympic history. Fittings included about 80,000 chairs, 70,000 tables, 29,000 mattresses, 60,000 clothes hangers, 6,000 television sets and 10,000 smartphones.

==== Olympic Park ====
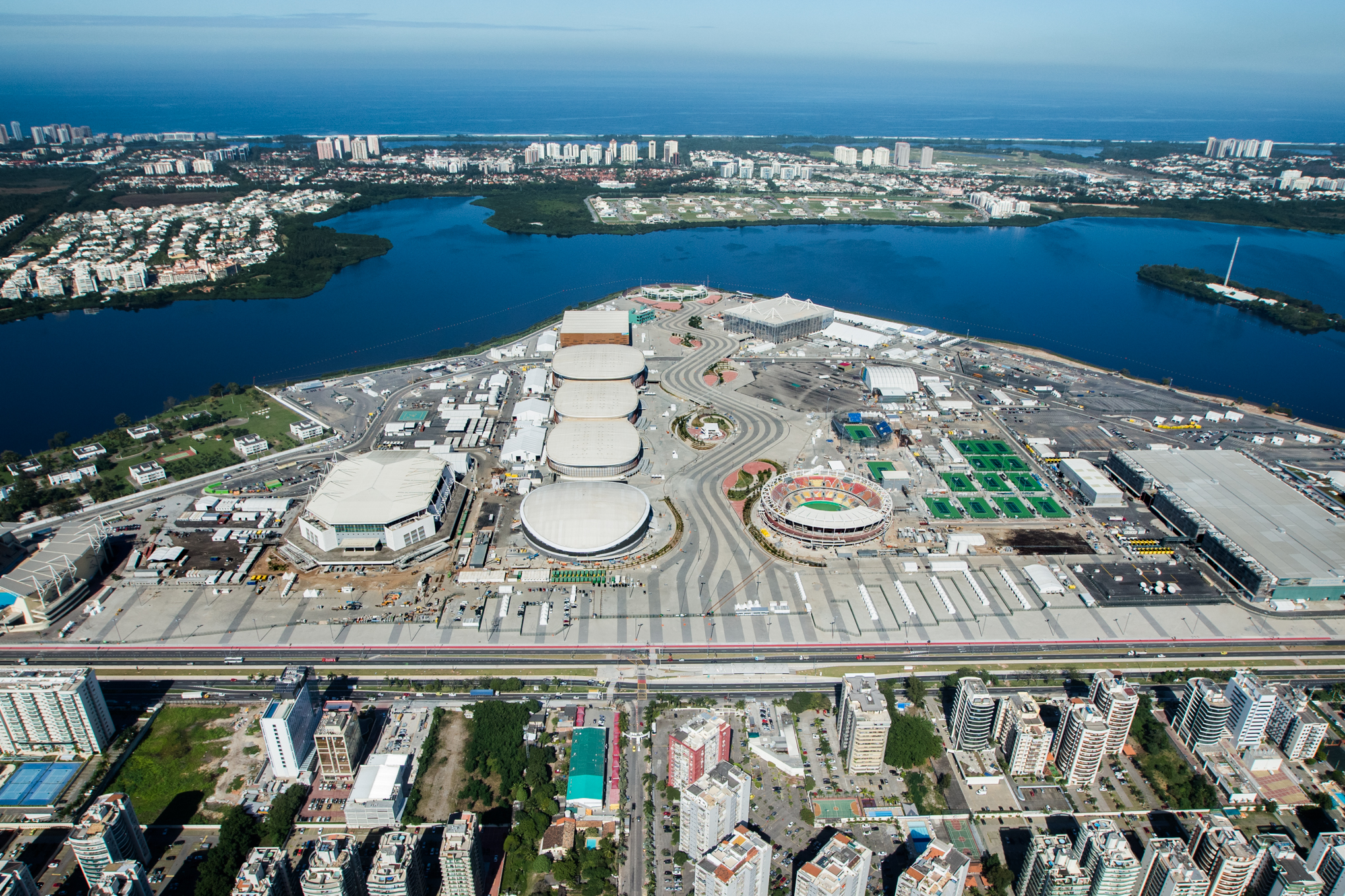
Barra Olympic Park

The Barra Olympic Park is a cluster of nine sporting venues in Barra da Tijuca, in the west zone of Rio de Janeiro, Brazil. The site was formerly occupied by the Autódromo Internacional Nelson Piquet, also known as the Jacarepaguá Formula One circuit.

The nine venues within the Olympic Park were:

- Carioca Arena 1 – basketball (capacity: 16,000)
- Carioca Arena 2 – wrestling, judo (capacity: 10,000)
- Carioca Arena 3 – fencing, taekwondo (capacity: 10,000)
- Future Arena – handball (capacity: 12,000)
- Maria Lenk Aquatics Centre – diving, synchronized swimming, water polo (capacity: 5,000)
- Olympic Aquatics Stadium – swimming, water polo play-offs (capacity: 15,000)
- Olympic Tennis Centre – tennis (capacity: 10,000 Main Court)
- Rio Olympic Arena – gymnastics (capacity: 12,000)
- Rio Olympic Velodrome – track cycling (capacity: 5,000)

==== Football ====
As well as the Estádio Olímpico João Havelange and Maracanã and in Rio de Janeiro, football matches took place at five venues in the cities of São Paulo, Belo Horizonte, and the more distant Salvador, Brasília and Manaus.

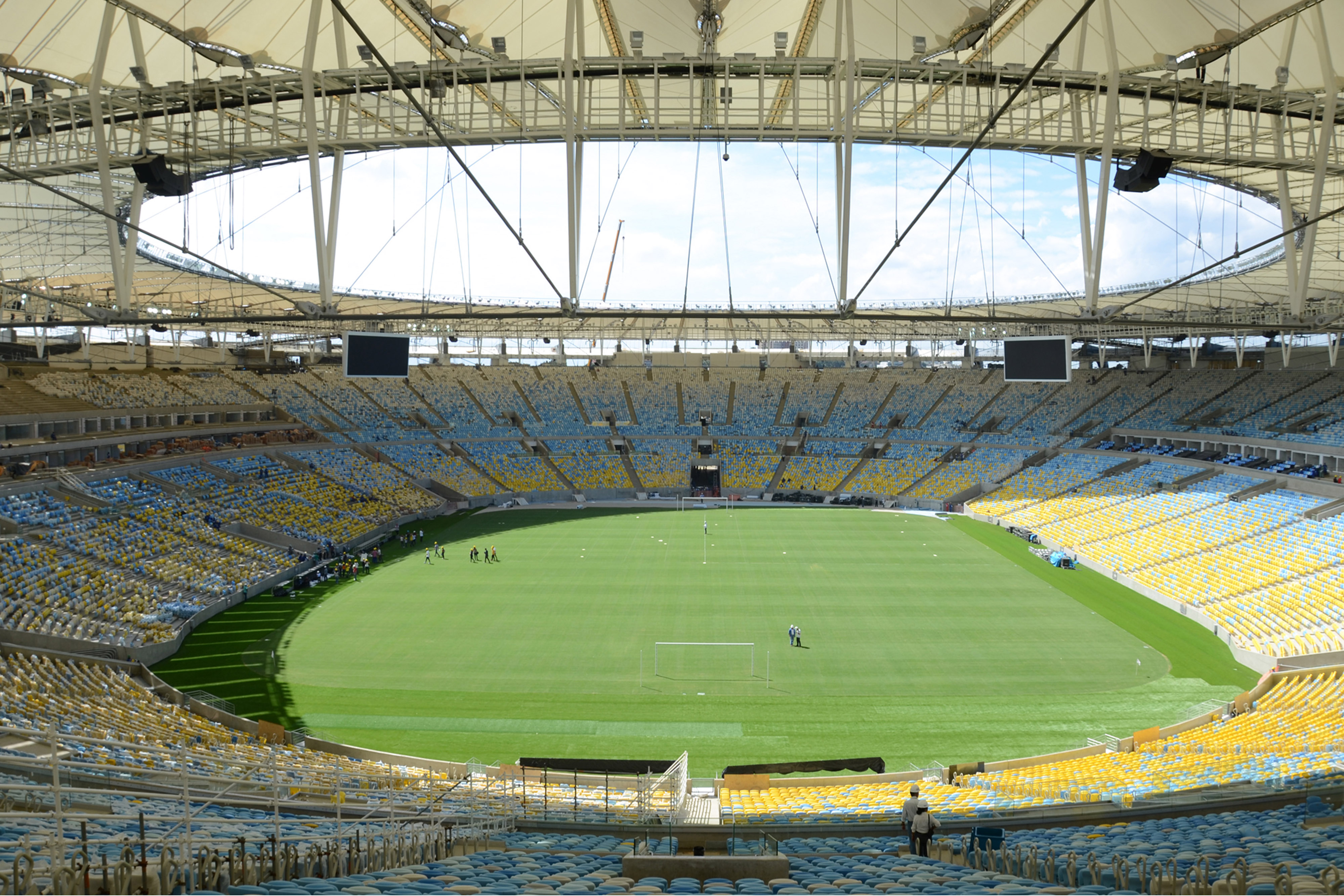
Maracanã Stadium
Rio de Janeiro, RJ

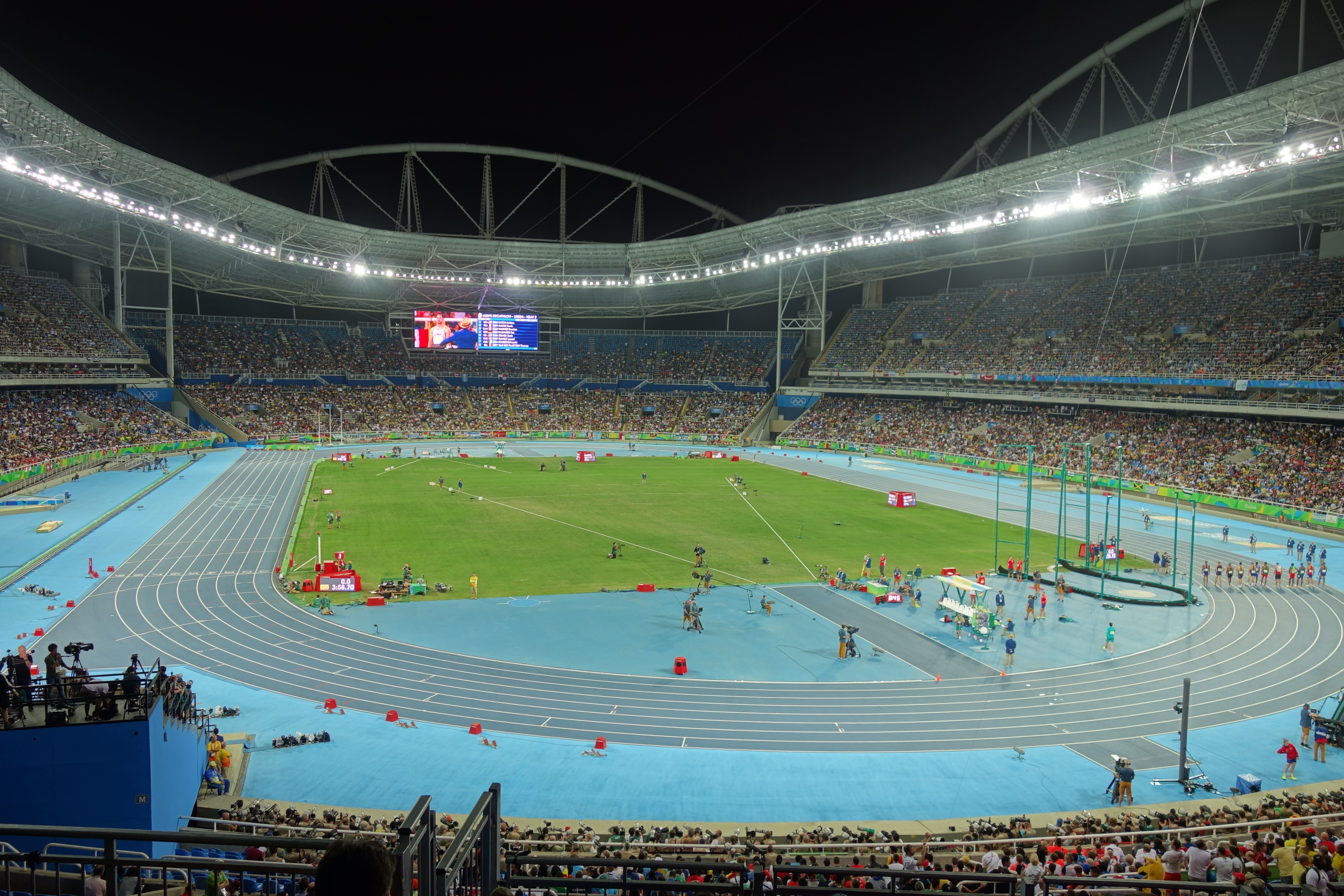
Olympic Stadium
Rio de Janeiro, RJ

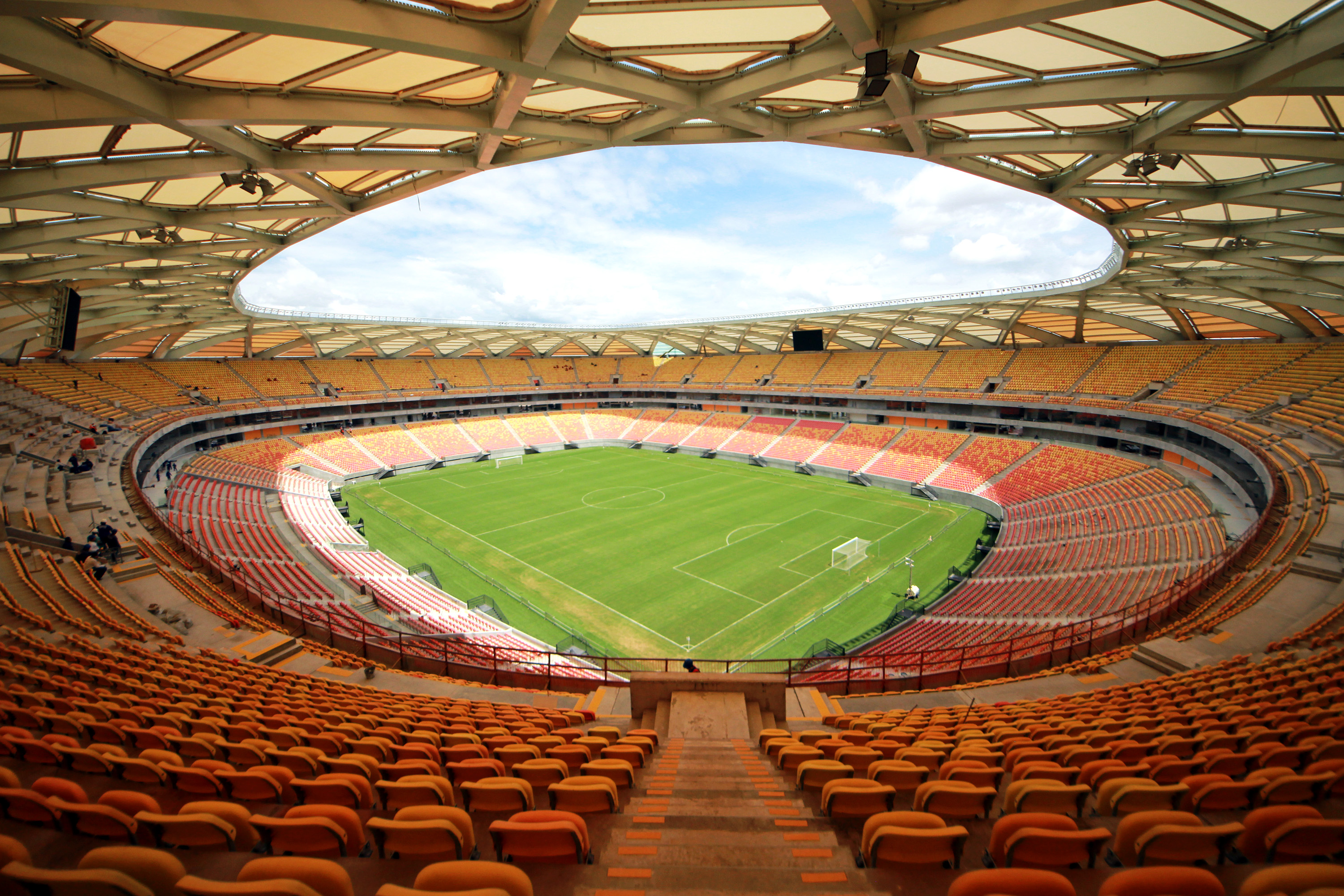
Arena da Amazônia
Manaus, AM

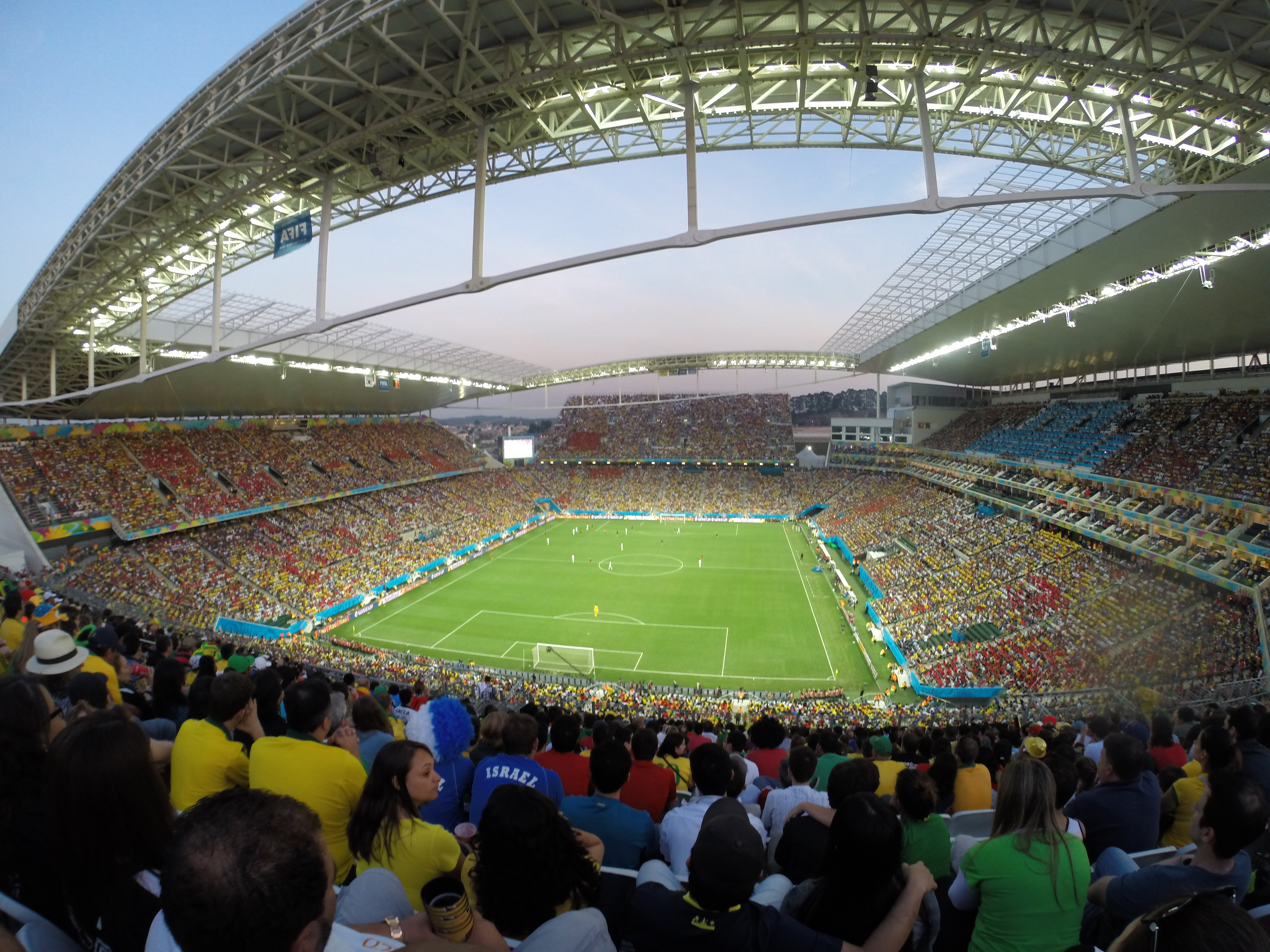
Arena Corinthians
São Paulo, SP

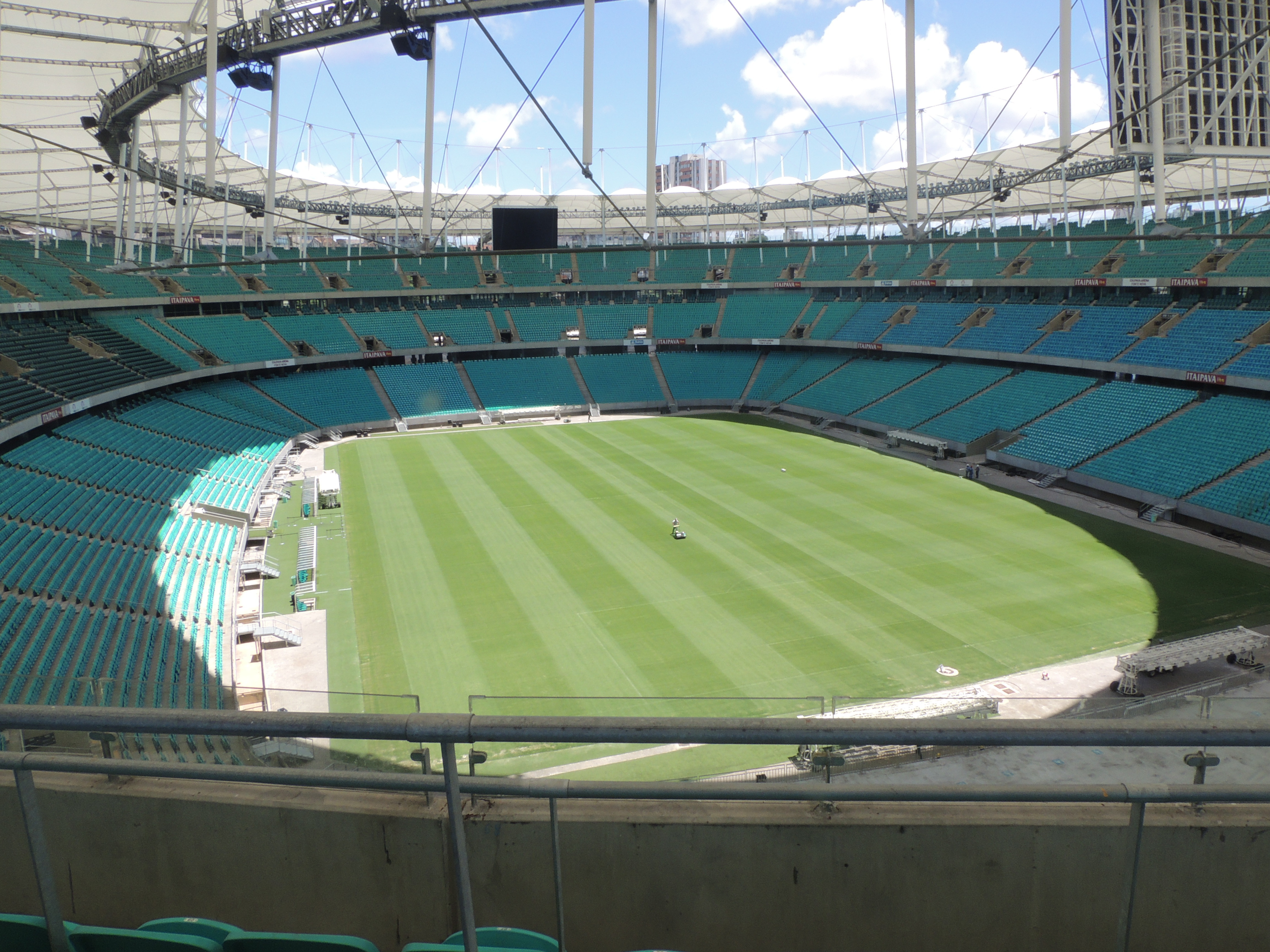
Arena Fonte Nova
Salvador, BA

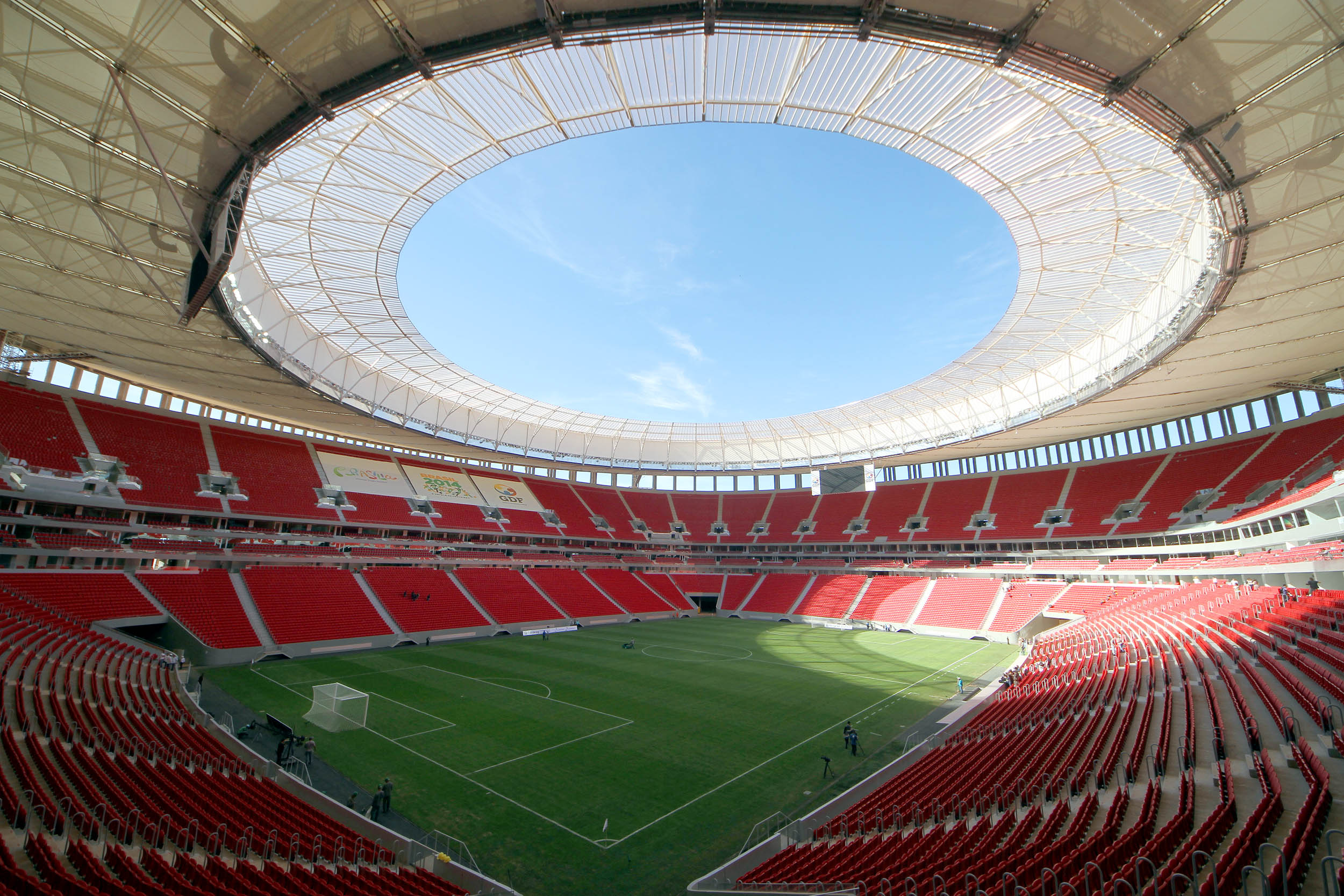
Estádio Nacional
Brasília, DF

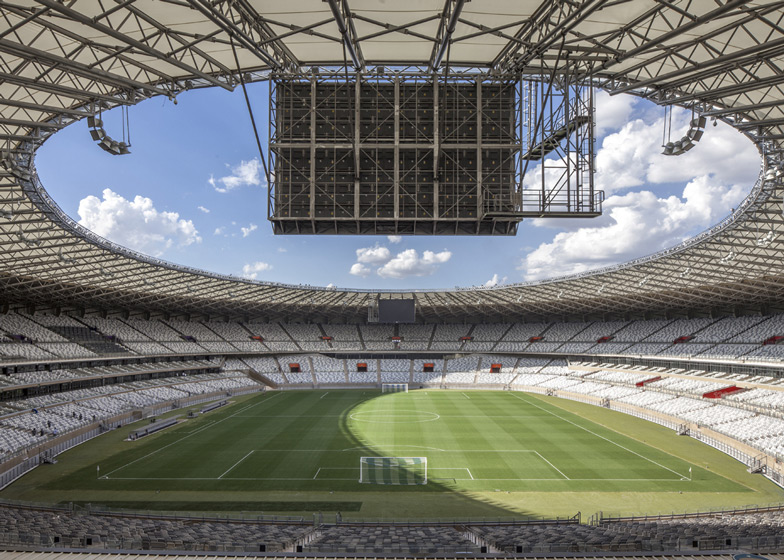
Mineirão
Belo Horizonte, MG

=== Urban renovations ===
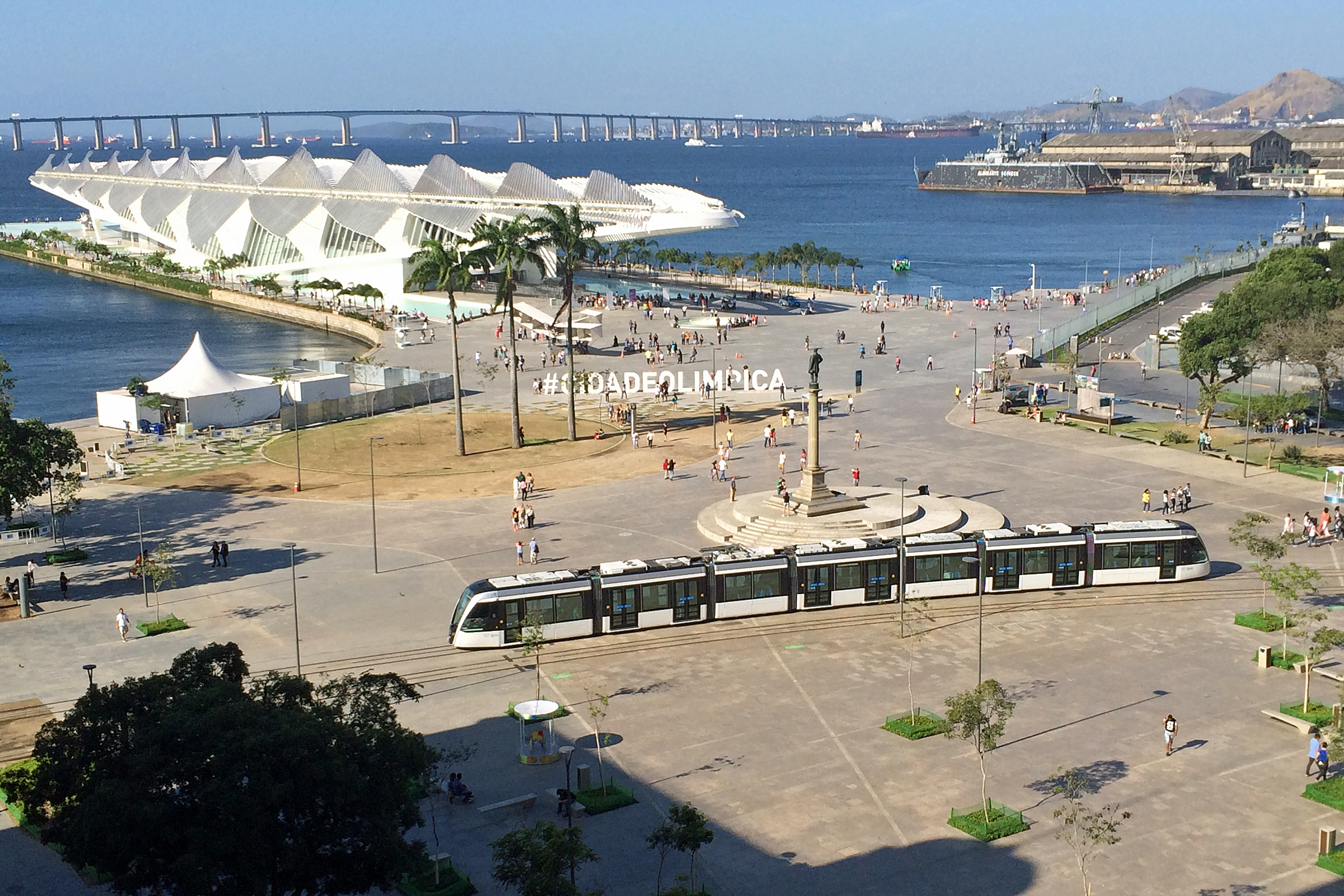
Mauá Square, with the Museum of Tomorrow, designed by Santiago Calatrava, and the light rail

Rio's historical downtown underwent an urban waterfront revitalization project known as Porto Maravilha, covering 5 km^{2} (1.9 mi^{2}) in area. The project aimed to redevelop the port area, increase the city center's attractiveness, and enhance Rio's competitive position in the global economy.

The urban renovation involved 700 km (430 mi) of public networks for water supply, sanitation, drainage, electricity, gas and telecom; 4 km (2.5 mi) of tunnels; 70 km (43 mi) of roads; 650 km^{2} (250 mi^{2}) of sidewalks; 17 km (11 mi) of bike path; 15,000 trees; and three sanitation treatment plants. As part of this renovation, a new tram was built from the Santos Dumont Airport to Rodoviária Novo Rio, due to open in April 2016.

The Games required over 200 kilometers of security fencing. A 15,000 square meter warehouse in Barra da Tijuca was used to assemble and supply the furniture and fittings for the Olympic Village. The second warehouse of 90,000 square meters in Duque de Caxias, near the roads that provide access to the venues, contained all the equipment needed for the sporting events.

=== Medals ===
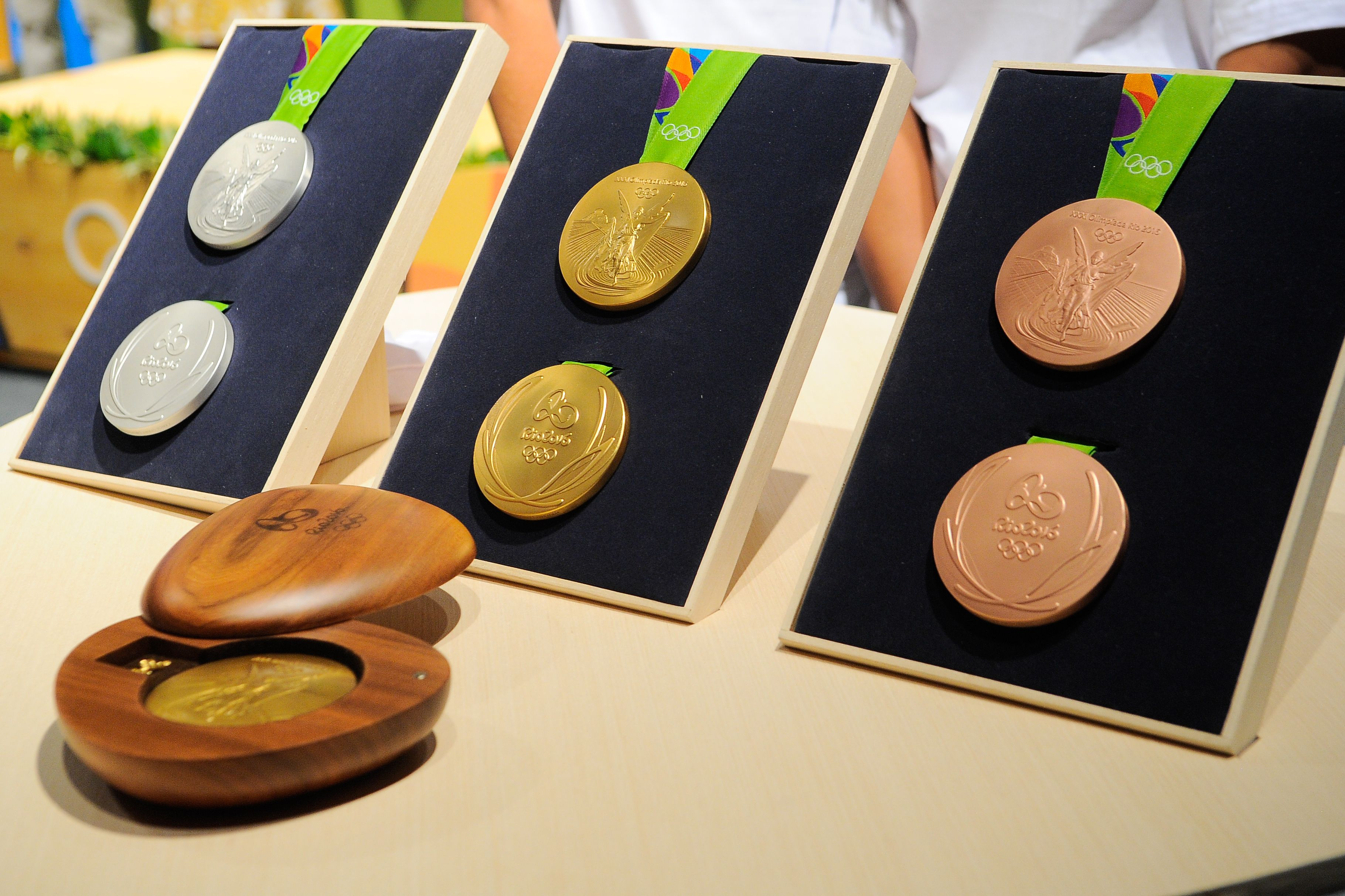
Medals of the 2016 Summer Olympics

The medals were produced by the Casa da Moeda do Brasil (the Brazilian National Mint). The medal design was unveiled on 15 June 2016. They were designed to be environmentally friendly using recycled materials; the bronze and silver medals contained 30% recycled materials. The gold medals were produced using gold that had been mined and extracted according to a set of sustainability criteria, such as being extracted without the use of mercury. The medals feature a wreath design on the front, and in keeping with tradition, the obverse features Nike, the Greek goddess of victory. A wooden carrying box accompanied each medal. Medalists were also awarded a trophy in the shape of the Games' emblem.

In May 2017, an Associated Press article disclosed that over 100 athletes who had won medals at the Rio Olympics reported that their medals were showing some damage, including black spots, flaking, or surface degrading. Rio officials offered to replace any defective medals and found problems with 6 to 7 percent of all those awarded.

=== Podium ===
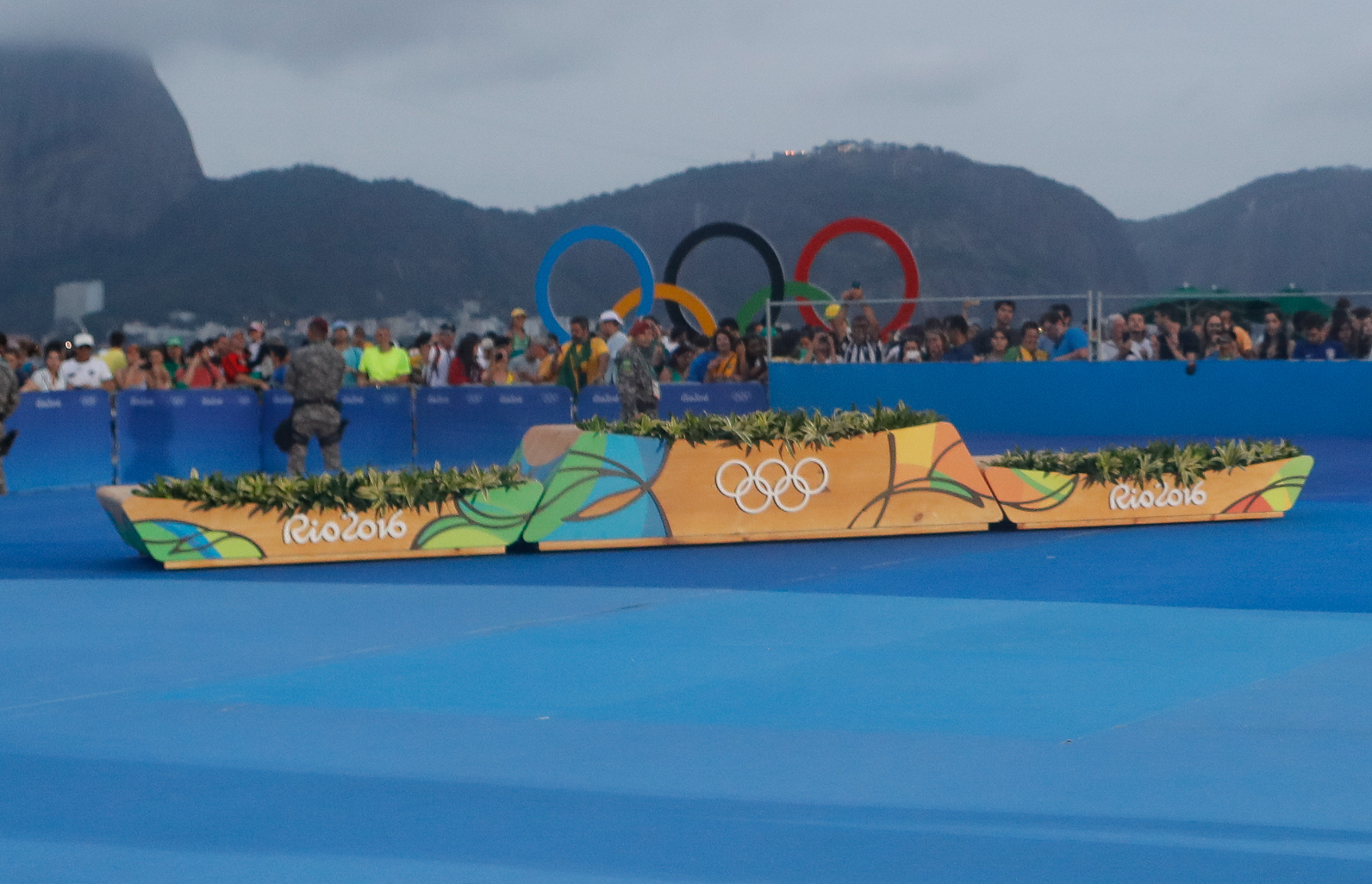
One of the podiums used at the Rio 2016 Summer Olympics

The Rio 2016 podiums featured designs and vegetation reminiscent of the city of Rio de Janeiro.

The podiums were made from wood and adorned with foliage in keeping with the natural “Look” of the Games.

They also needed to be light enough to be easily carried and assembled, but also strong enough to support up to 18 athletes on each stand.

The blue, green, yellow and orange colours that feature on the podium were symbolic of the Games' visual identity, inspired by Brazil’s harmonic diversity.

All materials were organic and celebrated the tropical nature of Brazil, with the intent to be reused as furniture after the Games.

After the games, the podium from the Brazilian national football team's Olympic gold medal, that was 12 meters wide, was being auctioned off. It was divided into five parts, with values ranging from R$ 505,00 to R$ 925,00. In the end, it was businessman Sérgio Santos who ended up buying the piece.

=== Torch relay ===
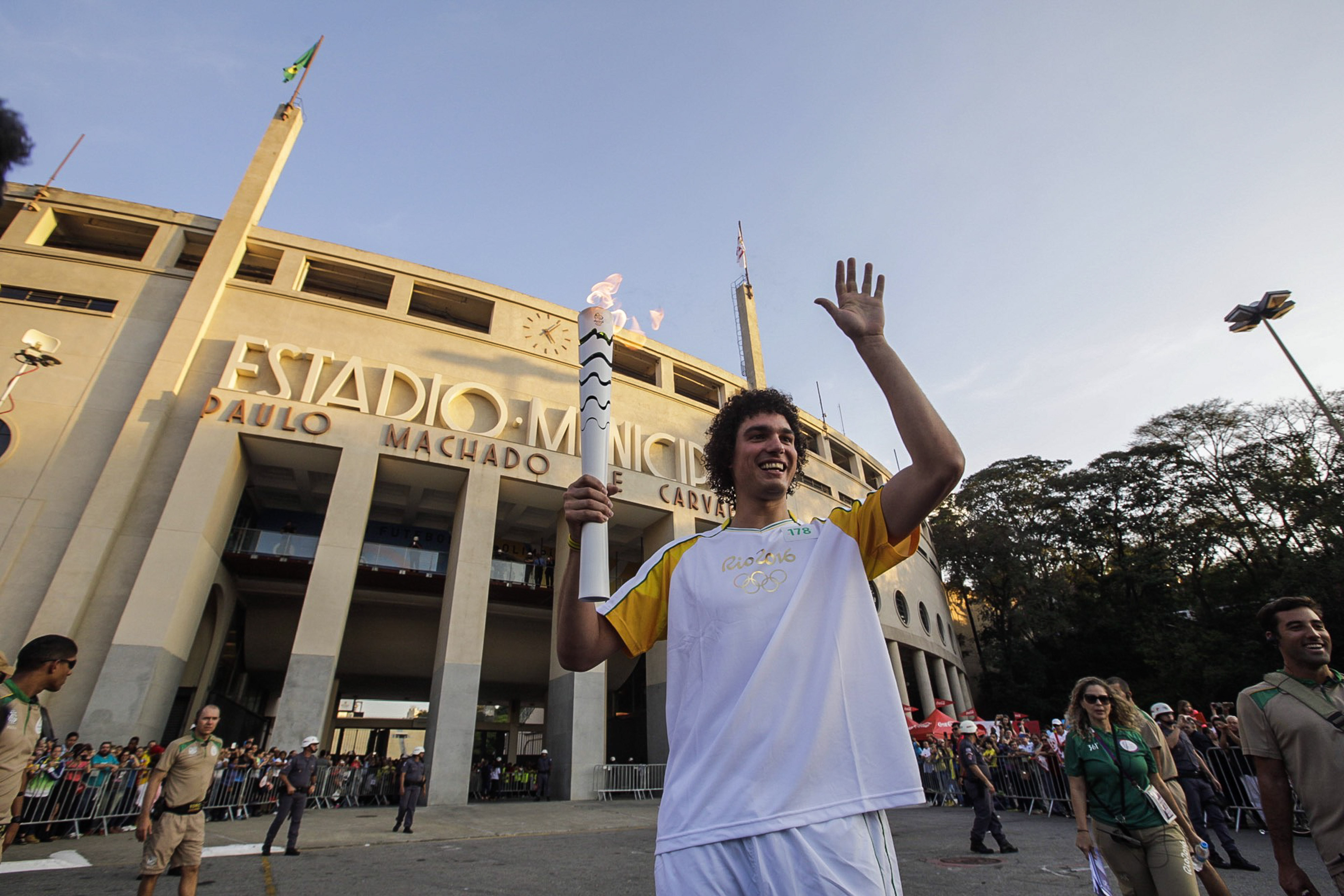
Basketball player Anderson Varejão carrying the torch in São Paulo

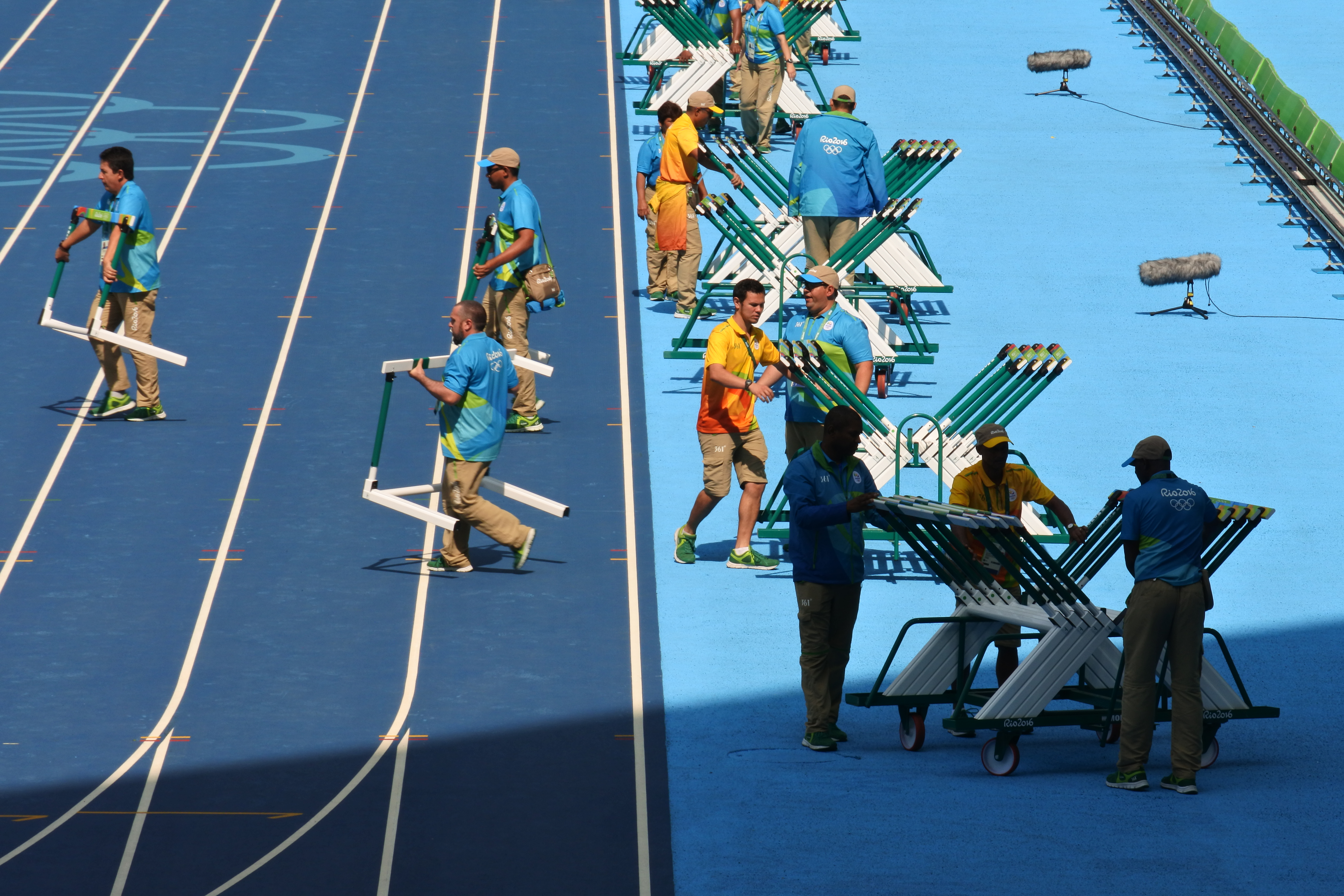
Volunteers working at the Olympic Stadium during the Games

The Olympic flame was lit on 21 April 2016 at the Temple of Hera in Olympia, the traditional start of the Greek phase of the torch relay. The flame was handed over to the Brazilian organisers in a ceremony at the Panathenaic Stadium in Athens on 27 April. A brief stop-off was made in Switzerland to visit the IOC headquarters and the Olympic Museum in Lausanne, as well as the United Nations Office at Geneva.

The torch relay began its journey around Brazil on 3 May at the capital Brasília. The flame visited more than 300 Brazilian cities, including all 26 state capitals and the Brazilian Federal District. The relay ended in Rio de Janeiro on 5 August when the flame was used to light the Olympic cauldron during the opening ceremony.

=== Volunteers ===
Unpaid volunteers performed a variety of tasks before and during the Games. A target of 50,000 volunteers was set as early as 2012. More than 240,000 applications were received when recruitment took place in 2014. The clothing worn by the volunteers included yellow polo shirts and jackets, beige trousers, white socks, and green trainers, which they collected from the Uniform Distribution and Accreditation Centre. Volunteers also wore photo accreditation badges which were allocated to officials, athletes, family members, and media, allowing them to gain access to specific venues and buildings around the site. Many volunteers gave up their roles due to long working hours and insufficient free meals.

=== Ticketing ===
The ticket prices were announced on 16 September 2014, all of which were sold in Brazilian reais (BRL). A total of 7.5 million tickets were to be sold in total, with ticket prices ranging from BRL 40 for many events to BRL 4,600 for the most expensive seats at the opening ceremony. About 3.8 million of these tickets were available for BRL 70 or less.

=== Sustainability ===
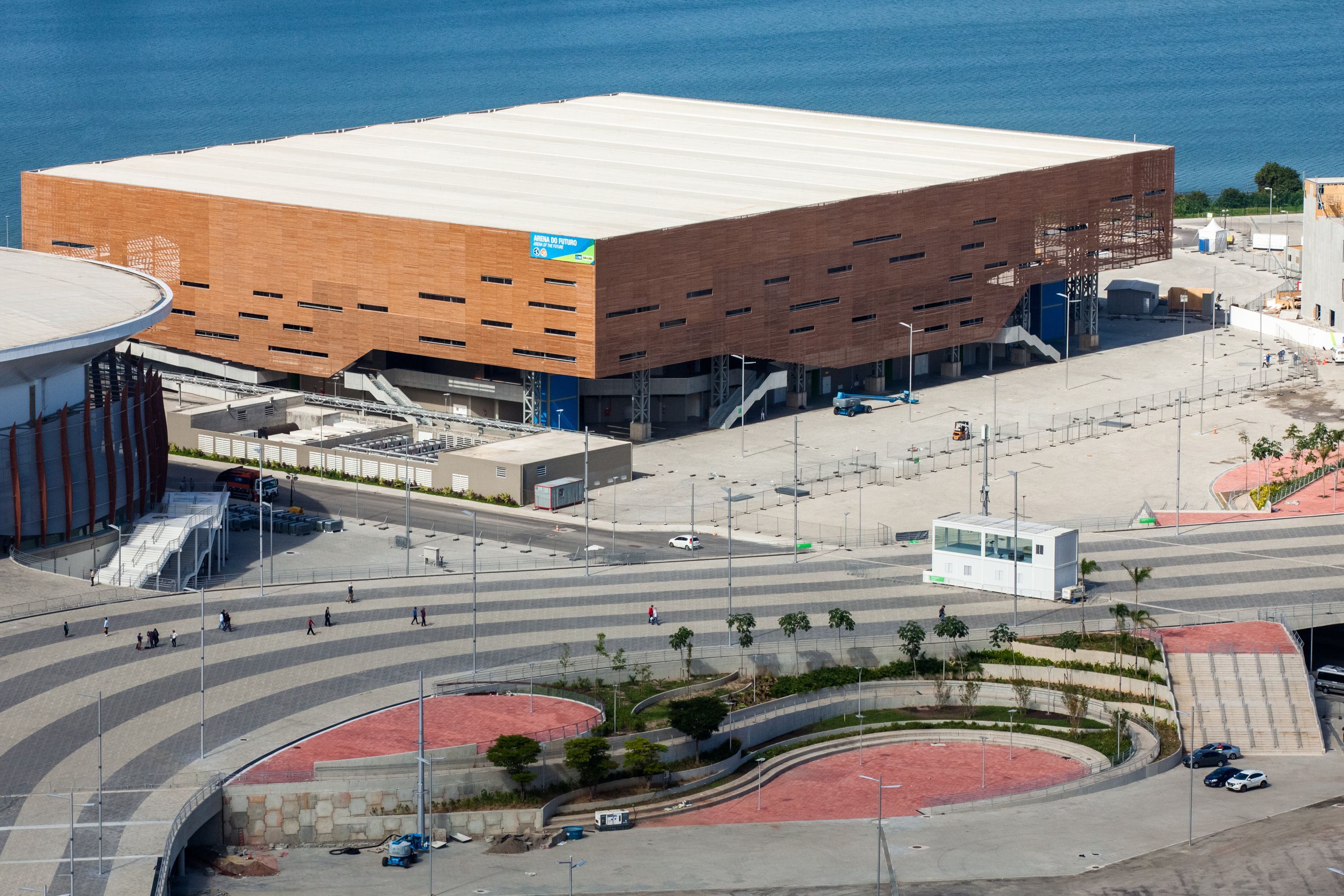
Future Arena, a temporary venue designed for future reconstruction into school buildings

As an aspect of its bid, Rio's organizing committee planned to focus on sustainability and environmental protection as a theme of the 2016 Games, going on to dub them a "Green Games for a Blue Planet". As legacy projects, organizers intended to introduce a wider array of public transport options, upgrade the infrastructure of the favelas to provide improved transport and access to utilities, upgrade Rio's sewer system to remediate the level of pollution in the Guanabara Bay, and plant 24 million seedlings to offset the expected carbon emissions of the Games. However, some of these projects met with delays or faced economic shortfalls, leading some critics to believe that Rio would not be able to accomplish them.

The focus on environmental protection also influenced the implementation of certain Olympic protocols. To reduce emissions, the Olympic cauldron was designed to be smaller than previous iterations, using a kinetic sculpture to enhance its appearance in place of a larger body of flames. The bronze and silver medals, as well as the ribbons on all medals, were designed to incorporate recycled materials. The athletes were not presented with flowers during the medal ceremonies, as had been the tradition at previous Olympics (although floral displays were still used as part of the staging of medal presentations). The organizers considered the practice to be wasteful because the flowers were often thrown away and "would struggle to survive in the tropical Brazilian climate" if kept. The podiums were designed using materials that could be recycled to make furniture.

The Future Arena, the venue for the handball competitions, was designed as a temporary modular structure whose components could be reconstructed after the Games to build schools. However, as of November 2017, the arena was still standing due to lack of funds to dismantle it and no allocation of funds to do so in the 2018 budget. Portions of the opening ceremony were dedicated to the issue of climate change.

== The Games ==
=== Opening ceremony ===
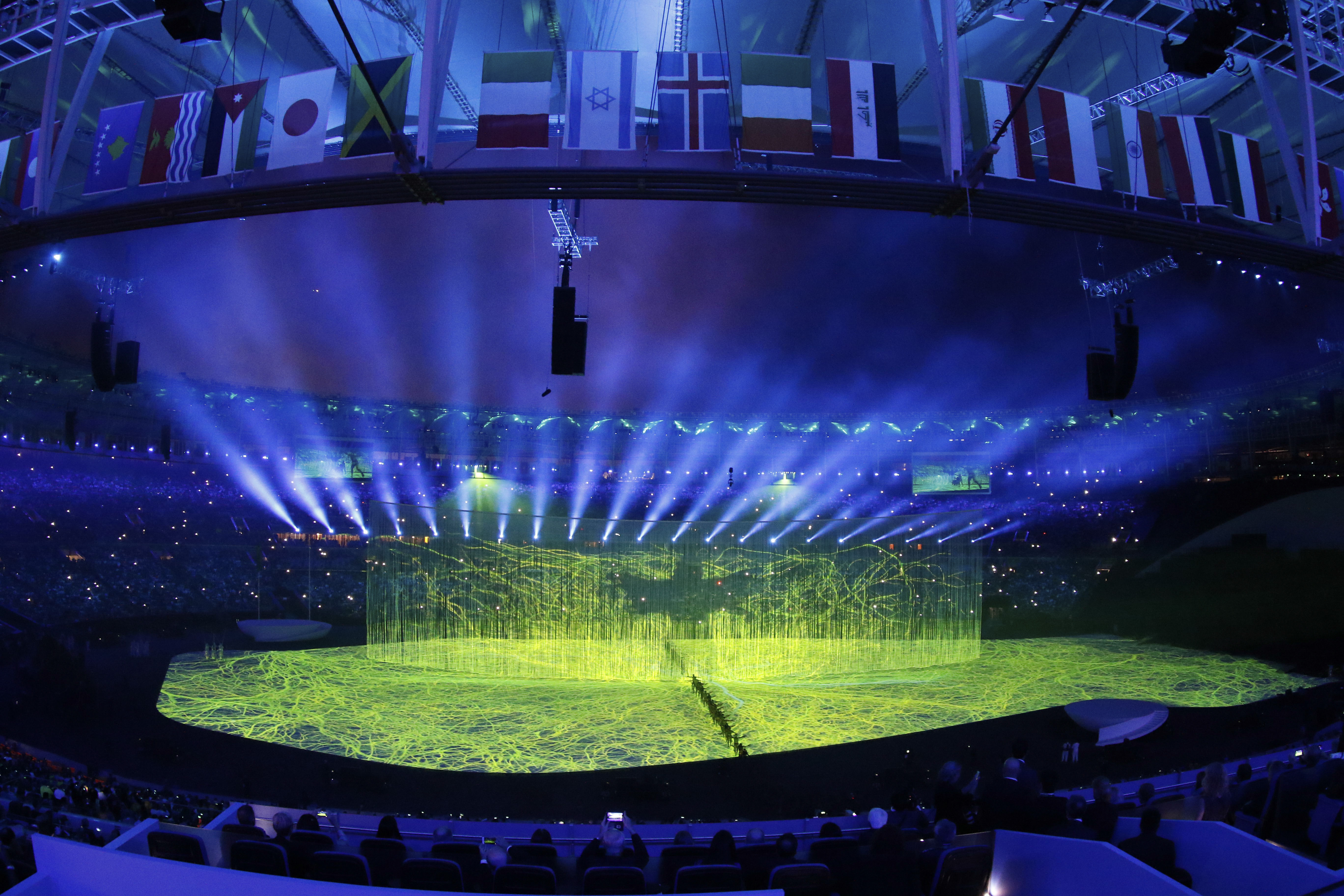
A scene from the opening ceremony

The opening ceremony took place at Maracanã Stadium on 5 August 2016, directed by Fernando Meirelles, Daniela Thomas, and Andrucha Waddington. The ceremony highlighted aspects of Brazilian history and culture, and featured a segment narrated by Fernanda Montenegro and Judi Dench with an appeal to environmental conservation and the prevention of global warming. The crowd in the stadium numbered 60,000 and the event was broadcast to an estimated global audience of three billion.

The ceremony included the inaugural presentation of the Olympic Laurel, an honor bestowed by the IOC on those that have made "significant achievements in education, culture, development and peace through sport"; the trophy was awarded to Kenyan athlete Kipchoge Keino. The Games were officially opened by the acting president of Brazil, Michel Temer.

The Olympic cauldron was lit by long-distance runner Vanderlei Cordeiro de Lima, the men's marathon bronze medalist at the 2004 Olympics, who had also received the IOC's Pierre de Coubertin medal for sportsmanship after being attacked by a spectator and losing his lead in the race. The cauldron was originally expected to be lit by Brazilian footballer Pelé, but he declined to participate due to health problems.

Following the opening ceremony, a public cauldron was lit in front of the Candelária Church by Jorge Gomes, a 14-year-old Brazilian athlete who had escaped from poverty to train as a runner.

=== Sports ===
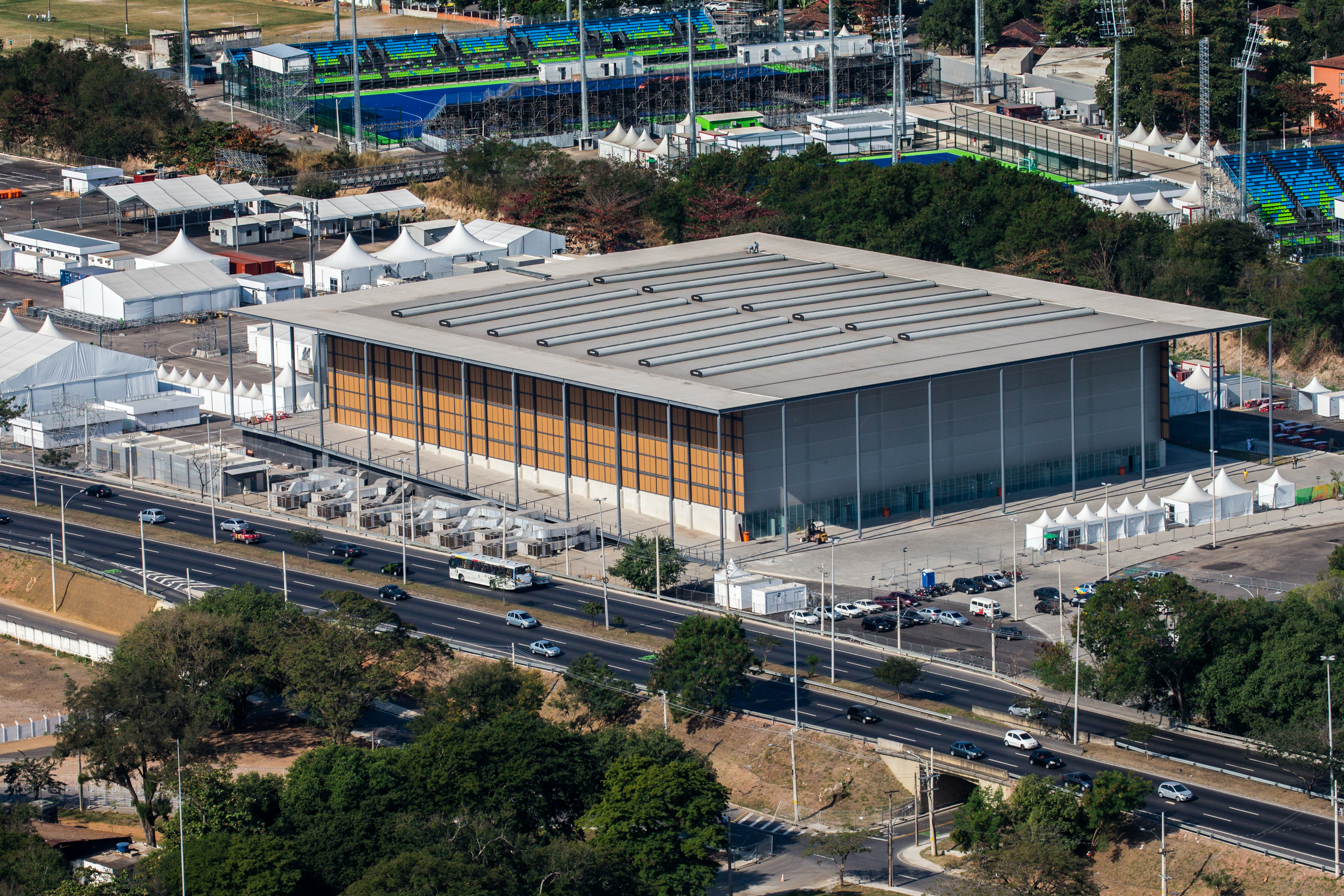
Youth Arena

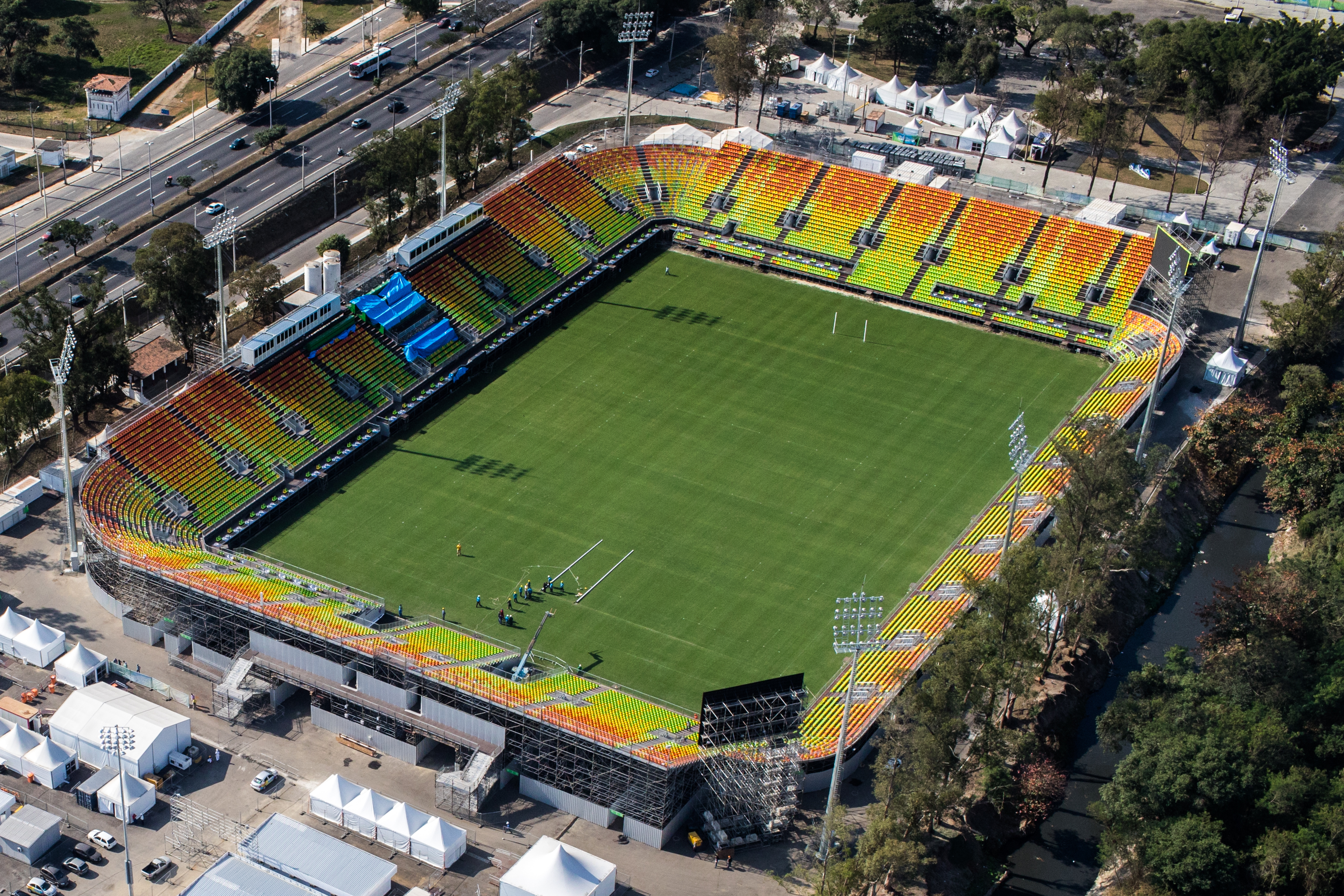
Deodoro Stadium

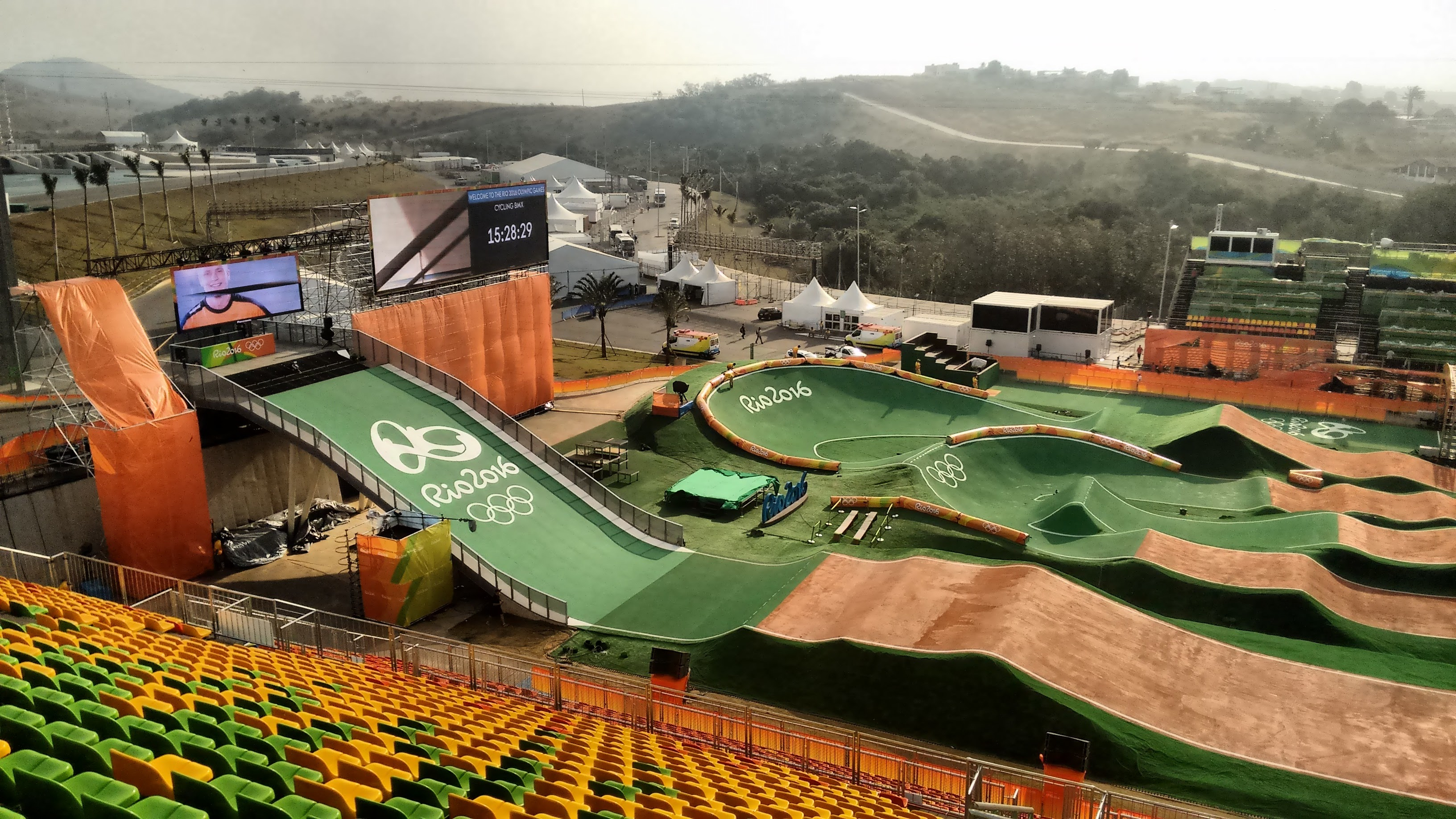
Olympic BMX Centre

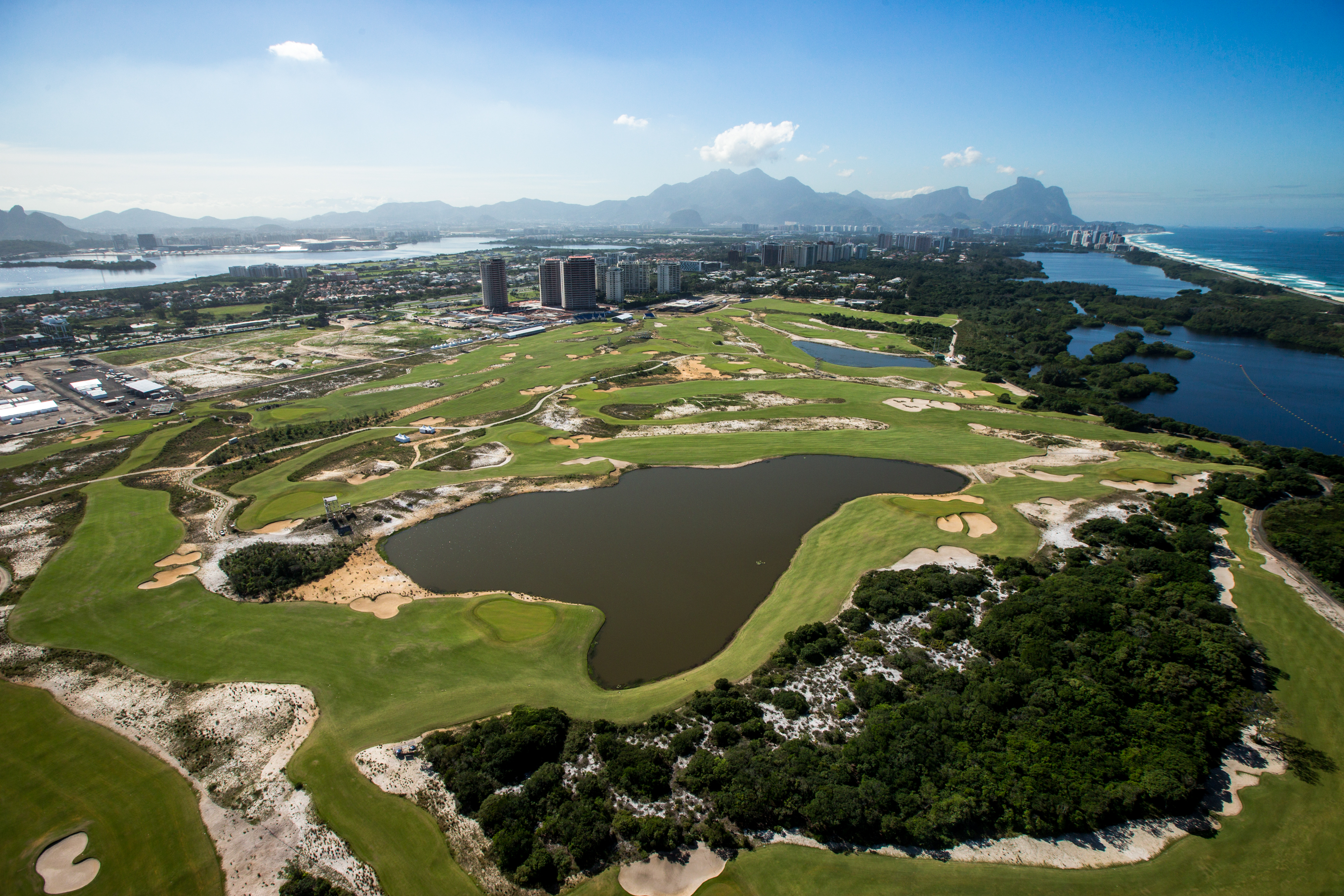
Olympic Golf Course

The 2016 Summer Olympic program featured 28 sports encompassing 306 medal events. The number of events in each of 42 discipline is noted in parentheses.

2016 Summer Olympic Sports Programme

- Aquatics
  - Diving (8)
  - Marathon swimming (2)
  - Swimming (32)
  - Synchronized swimming (2)
  - Water polo (2)
- Archery (4)
- Athletics (47)
- Badminton (5)
- Basketball (2)
- Boxing (13)
- Canoeing
  - Sprint (12)
  - Slalom (4)
- Cycling (competitors)
  - BMX (2)
  - Mountain biking (2)
  - Road (4)
  - Track (10)
- Equestrian
  - Dressage (2)
  - Eventing (2)
  - Jumping (2)
- Fencing (10)
- Field hockey (2)
- Football (2)
- Golf (2)
- Gymnastics
  - Artistic (14)
  - Rhythmic (2)
  - Trampoline (2)
- Handball (2)
- Judo (14)
- Modern pentathlon (2)
- Rowing (14)
- Rugby sevens (2)
- Sailing (10)
- Shooting (15)
- Table tennis (4)
- Taekwondo (8)
- Tennis (5)
- Triathlon (2)
- Volleyball
  - Volleyball (2)
  - Beach volleyball (2)
- Weightlifting (15)
- Wrestling
  - Freestyle (12)
  - Greco-Roman (6)

==== New sports ====
In April 2008, the IOC began accepting applications for two new sports to be introduced to the Olympic programme. Baseball and softball (which were both dropped in 2005), karate, squash, golf, roller sports, and rugby union all applied to be included on the programme. Formal presentations were made to the IOC executive board in June 2009.

In August, the executive board initially gave its approval to rugby sevens—a seven-player version of rugby union—by a majority vote; baseball/softball, roller sports, and squash were removed from contention, leaving golf, karate, and rugby sevens in the running. A final vote was held on 9 October 2009, the closing day of the 121st IOC Session. At this session, a new voting system was in place: a sport now needed only a simple majority from the full IOC committee for approval rather than the two-thirds majority previously required.

The 121st IOC Session decided to add rugby sevens and golf to the Rio 2016 Olympic programme. The tally for rugby was 81 in favor, with eight against, and golf was approved by 63 votes to 26. Neither of these two sports was new to the Summer Olympics; rugby last featured in 1924, and golf in 1904.

In May 2012, the International Sailing Federation announced that windsurfing would be replaced by kitesurfing at the 2016 Olympics, but this decision was reversed in November.

=== Records ===
Twenty-seven world records and ninety-one Olympic records were set during the 2016 Summer Olympics. The records were set in archery, athletics, canoeing, cycling track, modern pentathlon, rowing, shooting, swimming, and weightlifting.

=== Event scheduling ===
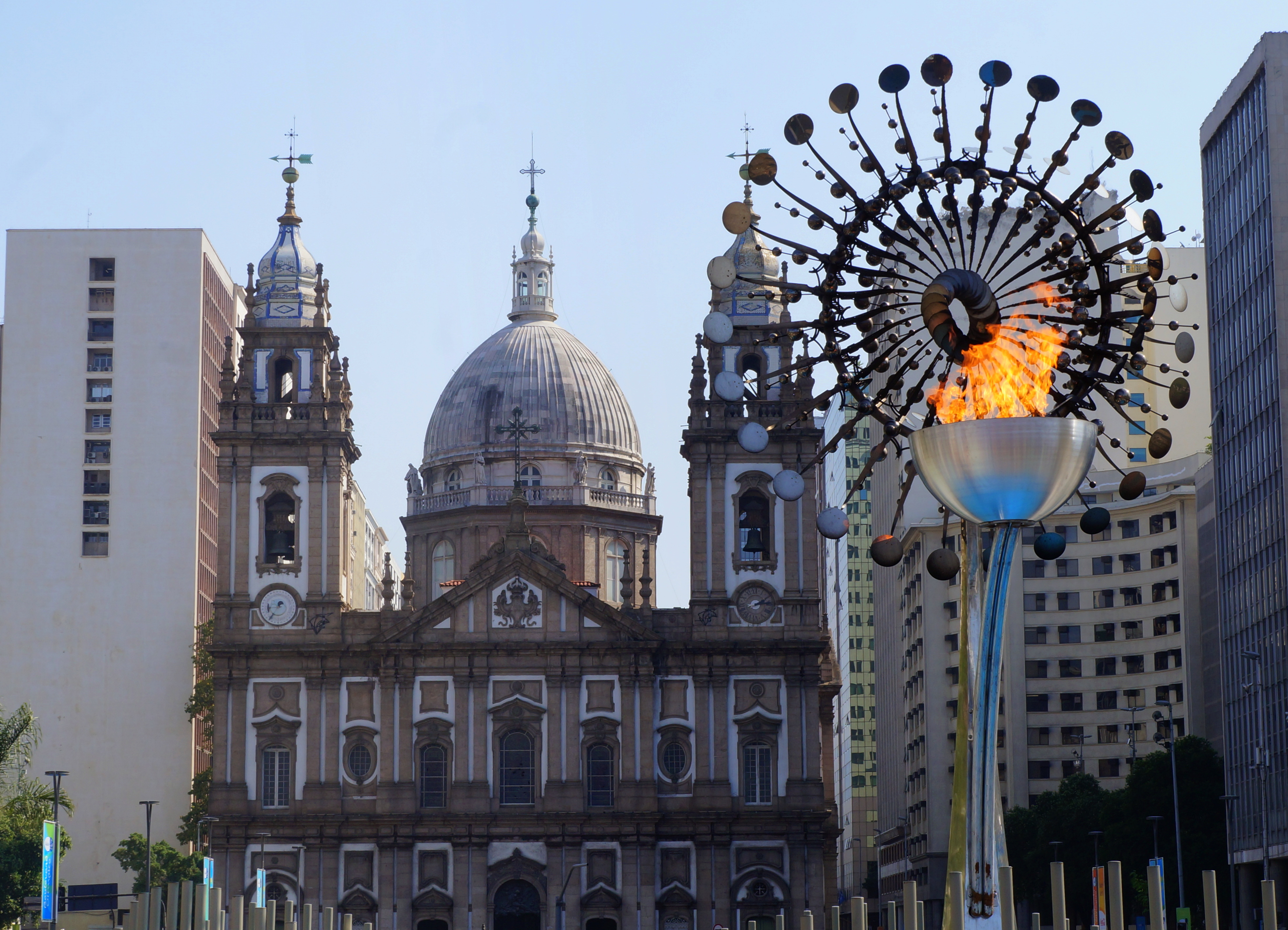
The public cauldron, located outside the Candelária Church

A number of events, most notably in aquatics, beach volleyball and track and field, were scheduled with sessions and matches occurring as late as 10:00 p.m. to midnight BRT. These scheduling practices were influenced primarily by United States broadcast rightsholder NBC, whose substantial rights fees are one of the major sources of revenue for the IOC, who therefore allowed NBC to have influence on event scheduling to maximize U.S. television ratings when possible (on 7 May 2014, NBC agreed to a US$7.75 billion contract extension to air the Olympics through 2032, including US$1.23 billion for Rio 2016), as well as the main Brazilian rightsholder Rede Globo. As Brasília time is only one hour ahead of the U.S. Eastern Time Zone, certain marquee events were scheduled to occur during U.S. primetime hours (traditionally 8:00 to 11:00 p.m. ET, 9:00 p.m. to midnight BRT), allowing them to be broadcast live on the east coast as opposed to being delayed. This practice was also beneficial to Globo; a Brazilian critic noted that the network very rarely preempts its primetime telenovelas, as they are among the highest-rated programs in the country.

=== Closing ceremony ===
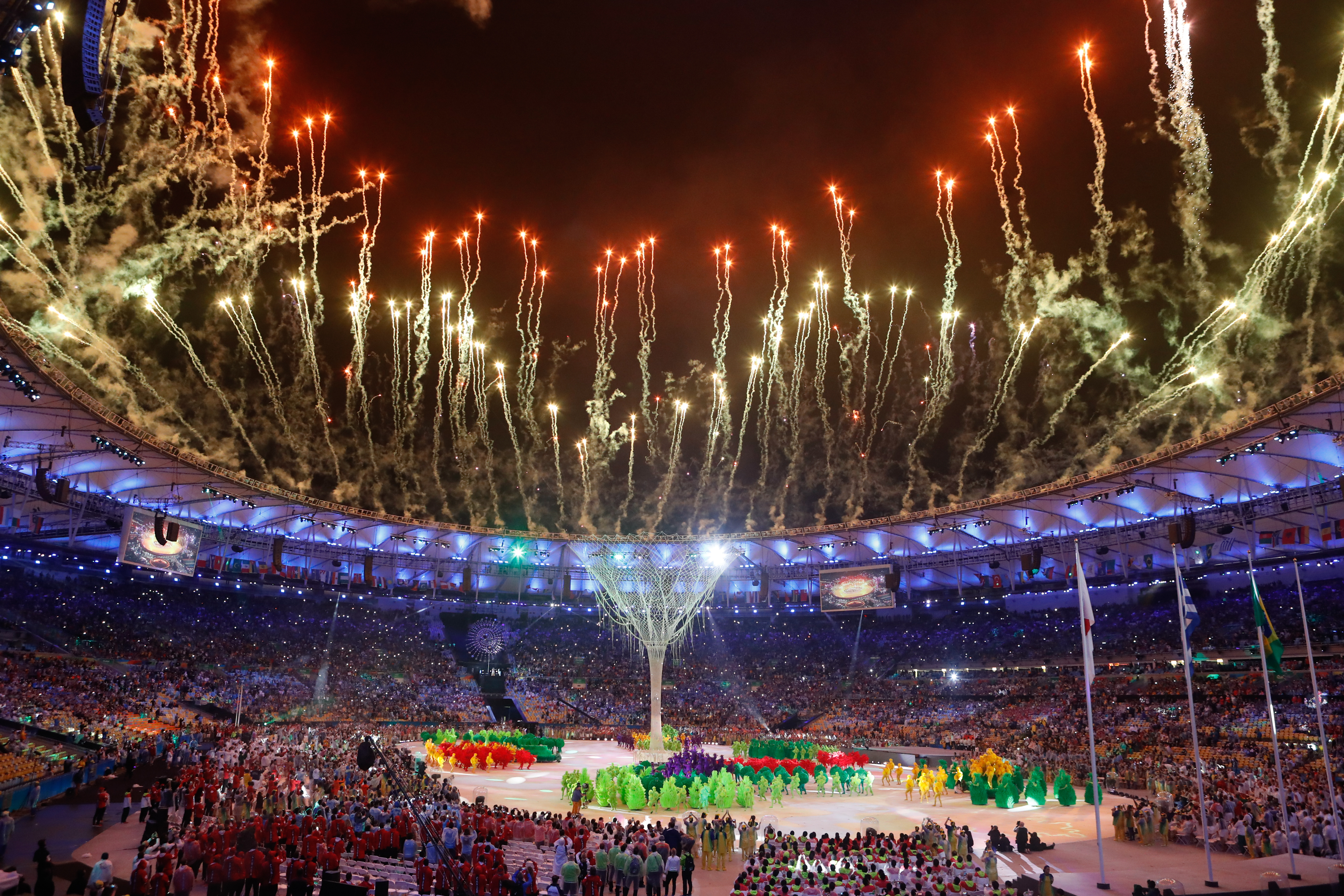
2016 Summer Olympics closing ceremony at Maracanã Stadium

The closing ceremony of the 2016 Summer Olympics was held on 21 August 2016 from 20:00 to 22:50 BRT at the Maracanã Stadium. As per traditional Olympic protocol, the ceremony featured cultural presentations from both the current (Brazil) and following (Japan) host countries, as well as closing remarks by IOC president Thomas Bach, who declared the Games closed, and the Games' organizing committee leader Carlos Arthur Nuzman, the official handover of the Olympic flag from Rio de Janeiro mayor Eduardo Paes to Tokyo governor Yuriko Koike, whose city will host the 2020 Summer Olympics, and the extinguishing of the Olympic flame.

The creative director for the ceremony was Rosa Magalhães. Amid heavy rainfall, the ceremony began with interpretive dancers representing various landmarks in the host city. Martinho da Vila then performed a rendition of "Carinhoso" by Pixinguinha. In another segment, introducing the athletes, singer Roberta Sá channeled Carmen Miranda, the fruit-headdress-wearing, mid-century Hollywood diva who endures as a beloved camp figure. The Parade of Flags followed shortly after a choir of 27 children, representing the states of Brazil, sang the Brazilian national anthem.

=== Cost ===
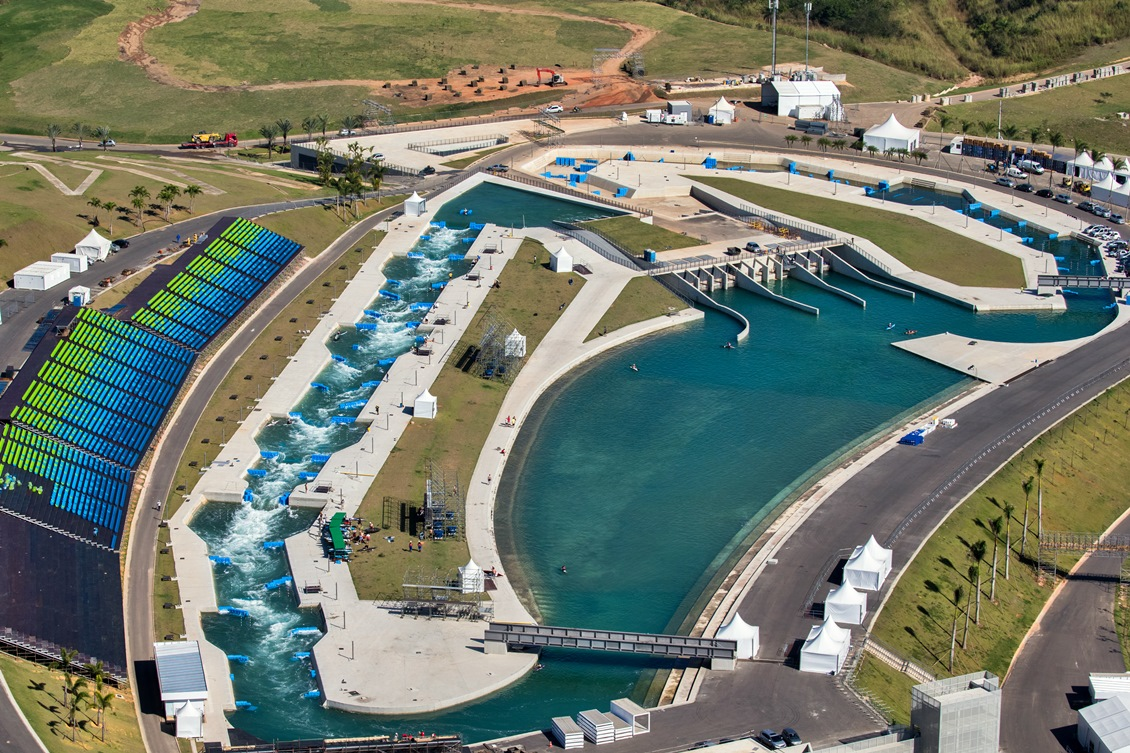
Deodoro Olympic Whitewater Stadium

The Oxford Olympics Study 2016 estimated the out-turn cost of the Rio 2016 Summer Olympics at US$4.6 billion in 2015-dollars. This figure included sports-related costs, that is, (i) operational costs incurred by the organizing committee to stage the Games, of which the largest components were technology, transportation, workforce, and administration costs, while other operational costs included security, catering, ceremonies, and medical services, and (ii) direct capital costs incurred by the host city and country or private investors to build the competition venues, the Olympic village, international broadcast center, and media and press center, which were required to host the Games.

Indirect capital costs were not included, such as for road, rail, or airport infrastructure, for hotel upgrades, or other business investment incurred in preparation for the Games but not directly related to staging the Games. The Rio Olympics' cost of US$4.6 billion compares with costs of US$40–44 billion for Beijing 2008 and US$51 billion for Sochi 2014, the two most expensive Olympics in history. The average cost of the Summer Games since 1960 is US$5.2 billion.

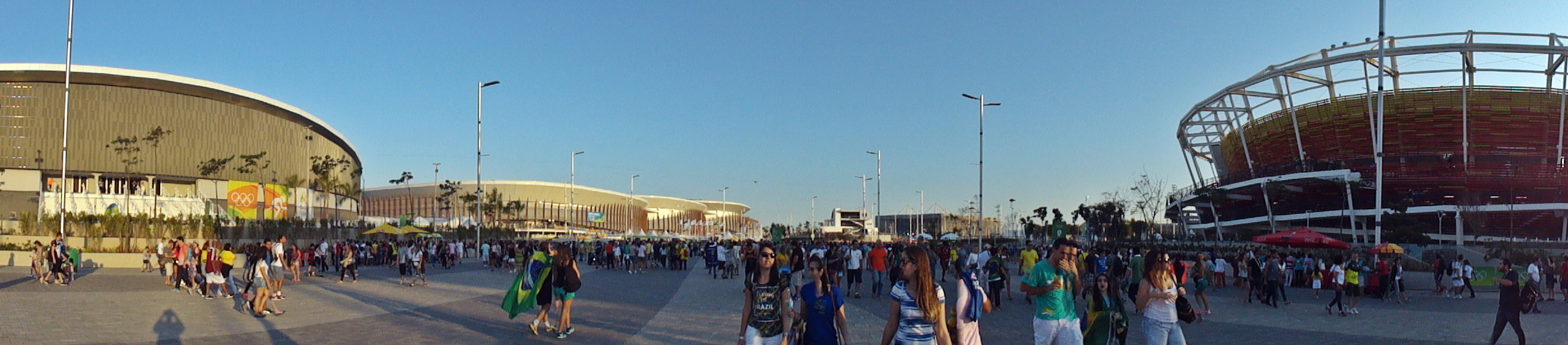
Barra Olympic Park

== Participating National Olympic Committees ==
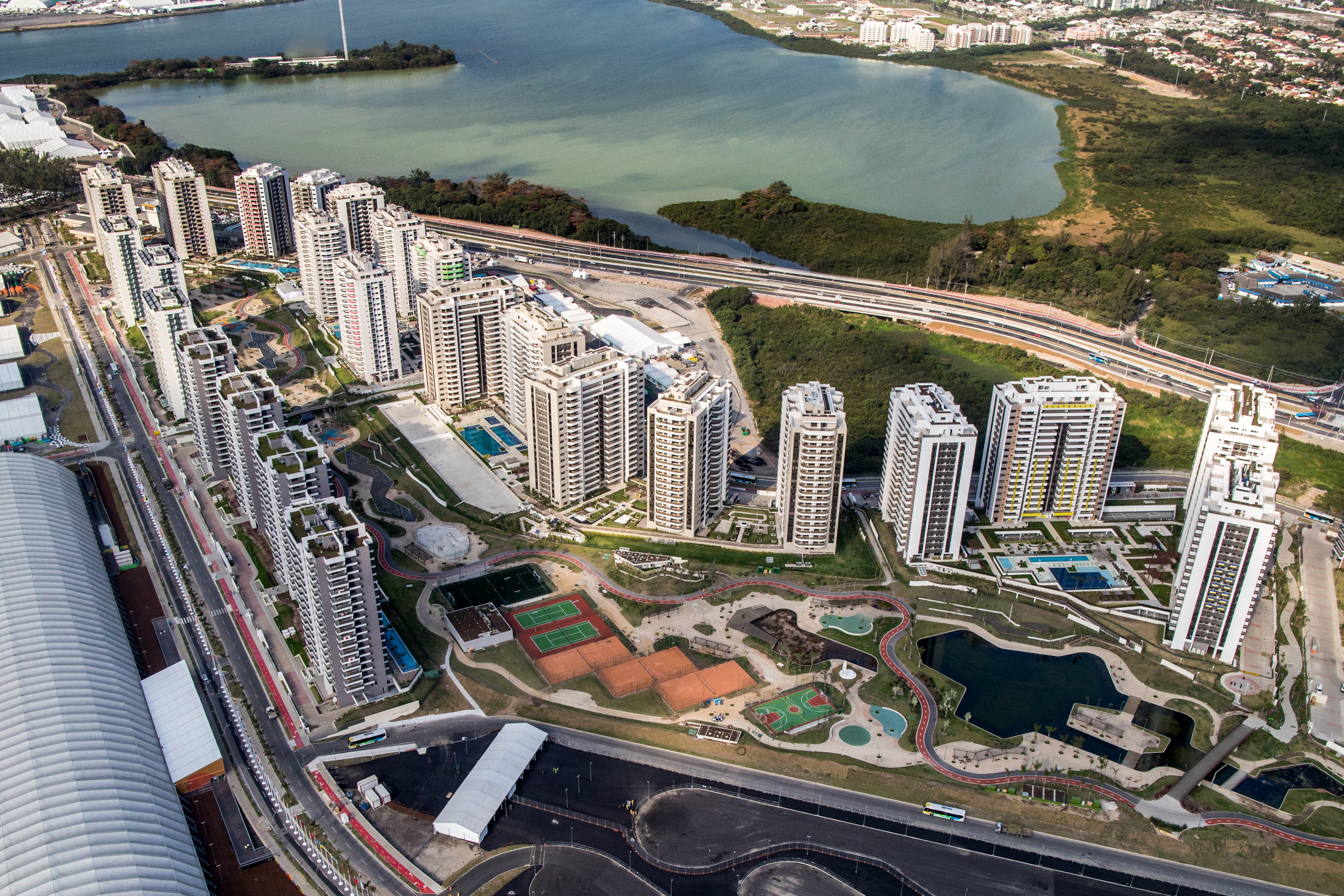
Rio 2016 Olympic Village

All 205 National Olympic Committees qualified at least one athlete. The first three nations to qualify athletes for the Games were Germany, Great Britain, and the Netherlands, who each qualified four athletes for the team dressage by winning medals in the team event at the 2014 FEI World Equestrian Games.

As host nation, Brazil received automatic entry for some sports including in all cycling disciplines and six places for weightlifting events.

The 2016 Summer Olympics were the first Games in which Kosovo and South Sudan were eligible to participate. Bulgarian and Russian weightlifters were banned from Rio Olympics for numerous anti-doping violations.

Kuwait was banned in October 2015 for the second time in five years over government interference in the country's Olympic committee. Kuwaiti athletes instead participated as "Independent Olympic Athletes".

Country by team size

Participating countries color code Blue = Participated for the first time in 2016. Green = Had previously participated. Yellow circle is host city (Rio de Janeiro)

Participating National Olympic Committees
- Afghanistan (3)
- Albania (6)
- Algeria (64)
- American Samoa (4)
- Andorra (4)
- Angola (26)
- Antigua and Barbuda (8)
- Argentina (215)
- Armenia (31)
- Aruba (7)
- Australia (420)
- Austria (71)
- Azerbaijan (56)
- Bahamas (28)
- Bahrain (33)
- Bangladesh (7)
- Barbados (11)
- Belarus (120)
- Belgium (104)
- Belize (3)
- Benin (6)
- Bermuda (8)
- Bhutan (2)
- Bolivia (12)
- Bosnia and Herzegovina (11)
- Botswana (12)
- Brazil (462) (host)
- British Virgin Islands (4)
- Brunei (3)
- Bulgaria (50)
- Burkina Faso (5)
- Burundi (9)
- Cambodia (6)
- Cameroon (22)
- Canada (310)
- Cape Verde (5)
- Cayman Islands (5)
- Central African Republic (6)
- Chad (2)
- Chile (42)
- China (392)
- Colombia (143)
- Comoros (4)
- Republic of the Congo (10)
- Democratic Republic of the Congo (4)
- Cook Islands (9)
- Costa Rica (11)
- Croatia (85)
- Cuba (117)
- Cyprus (15)
- Czech Republic (104)
- Denmark (119)
- Djibouti (7)
- Dominica (2)
- Dominican Republic (26)
- Ecuador (37)
- Egypt (121)
- El Salvador (8)
- Equatorial Guinea (1)
- Eritrea (12)
- Estonia (46)
- Ethiopia (37)
- Fiji (53)
- Finland (54)
- France (392)
- Gabon (6)
- The Gambia (4)
- Georgia (40)
- Germany (418)
- Ghana (13)
- Great Britain (360)
- Greece (92)
- Grenada (7)
- Guam (5)
- Guatemala (21)
- Guinea (5)
- Guinea-Bissau (5)
- Guyana (6)
- Haiti (10)
- Honduras (23)
- Hong Kong (37)
- Hungary (154)
- Iceland (8)
- India (112)
- Indonesia (28)
- Iran (63)
- Iraq (20)
- Ireland (76)
- Israel (47)
- Italy (309)
- Ivory Coast (12)
- Jamaica (56)
- Japan (335)
- Jordan (8)
- Kazakhstan (101)
- Kenya (79)
- Kiribati (3)
- North Korea (31)
- South Korea (207)
- Kosovo (8)
- Independent Olympic Athletes (9)
- Kyrgyzstan (19)
- Laos (6)
- Latvia (32)
- Lebanon (9)
- Lesotho (8)
- Liberia (2)
- Libya (7)
- Liechtenstein (3)
- Lithuania (67)
- Luxembourg (10)
- Macedonia (6)
- Madagascar (6)
- Malawi (5)
- Malaysia (32)
- Maldives (4)
- Mali (6)
- Malta (7)
- Marshall Islands (5)
- Mauritania (2)
- Mauritius (11)
- Mexico (123)
- Federated States of Micronesia (5)
- Moldova (23)
- Monaco (3)
- Mongolia (43)
- Montenegro (35)
- Morocco (48)
- Mozambique (6)
- Myanmar (7)
- Namibia (10)
- Nauru (2)
- Nepal (7)
- Netherlands (237)
- New Zealand (195)
- Nicaragua (5)
- Niger (6)
- Nigeria (71)
- Norway (62)
- Oman (4)
- Pakistan (7)
- Palau (5)
- Palestine (6)
- Panama (10)
- Papua New Guinea (8)
- Paraguay (11)
- Peru (29)
- Philippines (13)
- Poland (234)
- Portugal (90)
- Puerto Rico (40)
- Qatar (37)
- Refugee Olympic Team (10)
- Romania (95)
- Russia (284)
- Rwanda (7)
- Saint Kitts and Nevis (6)
- Saint Lucia (5)
- Saint Vincent and the Grenadines (4)
- Samoa (8)
- San Marino (4)
- São Tomé and Príncipe (3)
- Saudi Arabia (10)
- Senegal (22)
- Serbia (103)
- Seychelles (10)
- Sierra Leone (4)
- Singapore (25)
- Slovakia (51)
- Slovenia (63)
- Solomon Islands (3)
- Somalia (2)
- South Africa (135)
- Spain (307)
- Sri Lanka (9)
- Sudan (6)
- South Sudan (3)
- Suriname (6)
- Swaziland (2)
- Sweden (150)
- Switzerland (102)
- Syria (7)
- Chinese Taipei (55)
- Tajikistan (7)
- Tanzania (7)
- Thailand (54)
- Timor-Leste (3)
- Togo (5)
- Tonga (7)
- Trinidad and Tobago (28)
- Tunisia (61)
- Turkey (100)
- Turkmenistan (9)
- Tuvalu (1)
- Uganda (21)
- Ukraine (204)
- United Arab Emirates (12)
- United States (554)
- Uruguay (17)
- Uzbekistan (70)
- Vanuatu (4)
- Venezuela (85)
- Vietnam (22)
- Virgin Islands (7)
- Yemen (3)
- Zambia (7)
- Zimbabwe (30)

=== Number of athletes by National Olympic Committee ===
11,238 athletes from 207 NOCs

IOC Letter Code	Country	Athletes
USA	United States	554
BRA	Brazil	465
GER	Germany	425
AUS	Australia	421
CHN	China	413
FRA	France	399
GBR	Great Britain	366
JPN	Japan	338
CAN	Canada	314
ITA	Italy	309
ESP	Spain	306
RUS	Russia	282
POL	Poland	243
NED	Netherlands	242
ARG	Argentina	213
KOR	South Korea	205
UKR	Ukraine	203
NZL	New Zealand	199
HUN	Hungary	160
SWE	Sweden	152
COL	Colombia	147
RSA	South Africa	137
MEX	Mexico	125
DEN	Denmark	122
BLR	Belarus	121
CUB	Cuba	120
EGY	Egypt	120
IND	India	117
BEL	Belgium	108
CZE	Czech Republic	105
KAZ	Kazakhstan	104
SRB	Serbia	104
SUI	Switzerland	104
TUR	Turkey	103
ROM	Romania	97
GRE	Greece	95
POR	Portugal	92
KEN	Kenya	89
CRO	Croatia	87
VEN	Venezuela	87
IRL	Ireland	77
NGR	Nigeria	75
AUT	Austria	71
UZB	Uzbekistan	70
JAM	Jamaica	68
LTU	Lithuania	67
ALG	Algeria	64
IRN	Iran	64
NOR	Norway	62
SLO	Slovenia	61
TUN	Tunisia	61
TPE	Chinese Taipei	60
AZE	Azerbaijan	56
FIN	Finland	56
THA	Thailand	54
BUL	Bulgaria	51
FIJ	Fiji	51
MAR	Morocco	51
SVK	Slovakia	51
ISR	Israel	48
EST	Estonia	45
MGL	Mongolia	43
CHI	Chile	42
PUR	Puerto Rico	42
GEO	Georgia	39
ECU	Ecuador	38
HKG	Hong Kong	38
QAT	Qatar	38
BHR	Bahrain	35
PRK	North Korea	35
ETH	Ethiopia	34
LAT	Latvia	34
MNE	Montenegro	34
ARM	Armenia	33
MAS	Malaysia	32
TTO	Trinidad and Tobago	32
ZIM	Zimbabwe	31
DOM	Dominican Republic	29
PER	Peru	29
BAH	Bahamas	28
INA	Indonesia	28
HON	Honduras	26
ANG	Angola	25
SGP	Singapore	25
CMR	Cameroon	24
IRQ	Iraq	23
MDA	Moldova	23
VIE	Vietnam	23
SEN	Senegal	22
GUA	Guatemala	21
UGA	Uganda	21
KGZ	Kyrgyzstan	19
URU	Uruguay	17
CYP	Cyprus	16
GHA	Ghana	14
PHI	Philippines	13
UAE	United Arab Emirates	13
BAR	Barbados	12
BOL	Bolivia	12
BOT	Botswana	12
ERI	Eritrea	12
CIV	Ivory Coast	12
MRI	Mauritius	12
KSA	Saudi Arabia	12
BIH	Bosnia and Herzegovina	11
PAR	Paraguay	11
CGO	Republic of the Congo	10
CRC	Costa Rica	10
HAI	Haiti	10
LUX	Luxembourg	10
NAM	Namibia	10
PAN	Panama	10
ROT	Refugee Olympic Team	10
SEY	Seychelles	10
ANT	Antigua and Barbuda	9
ARU	Aruba	9
BDI	Burundi	9
COK	Cook Islands	9
IOA	Independent Olympic Athletes	9
LIB	Lebanon	9
SRI	Sri Lanka	9
TKM	Turkmenistan	9
BER	Bermuda	8
ESA	El Salvador	8
ISL	Iceland	8
JOR	Jordan	8
KOS	Kosovo	8
LES	Lesotho	8
PNG	Papua New Guinea	8
RWA	Rwanda	8
SAM	Samoa	8
BAN	Bangladesh	7
DJI	Djibouti	7
GRN	Grenada	7
LBA	Libya	7
MLT	Malta	7
MYA	Myanmar	7
NEP	Nepal	7
PAK	Pakistan	7
SKN	Saint Kitts and Nevis	7
SYR	Syria	7
TJK	Tajikistan	7
TAN	Tanzania	7
TGA	Tonga	7
ISV	Virgin Islands	7
ZAM	Zambia	7
LAO	Laos	6
AFG	Afghanistan	6
ALB	Albania	6
BEN	Benin	6
CAM	Cambodia	6
CAF	Central African Republic	6
GAB	Gabon	6
GUY	Guyana	6
MKD	Macedonia	6
MAD	Madagascar	6
MLI	Mali	6
MOZ	Mozambique	6
NIG	Niger	6
PLE	Palestine	6
SUD	Sudan	6
SUR	Suriname	6
AND	Andorra	5
BUR	Burkina Faso	5
CPV	Cape Verde	5
CAY	Cayman Islands	5
GUM	Guam	5
GUI	Guinea	5
GBS	Guinea-Bissau	5
MAW	Malawi	5
MHL	Marshall Islands	5
FSM	Federated States of Micronesia	5
NCA	Nicaragua	5
PLW	Palau	5
LCA	Saint Lucia	5
TOG	Togo	5
ASA	American Samoa	4
IVB	British Virgin Islands	4
COM	Comoros	4
COD	Democratic Republic of the Congo	4
GAM	The Gambia	4
MDV	Maldives	4
OMA	Oman	4
VIN	Saint Vincent and the Grenadines	4
SMR	San Marino	4
SLE	Sierra Leone	4
VAN	Vanuatu	4
BIZ	Belize	3
BRU	Brunei	3
KIR	Kiribati	3
LIE	Liechtenstein	3
MON	Monaco	3
STP	São Tomé and Príncipe	3
SOL	Solomon Islands	3
SSD	South Sudan	3
TLS	Timor-Leste	3
YEM	Yemen	3
BHU	Bhutan	2
CHA	Chad	2
DMA	Dominica	2
GEQ	Equatorial Guinea	2
LBR	Liberia	2
MTN	Mauritania	2
NRU	Nauru	2
SOM	Somalia	2
SWZ	Swaziland	2
TUV	Tuvalu	1

=== Refugee athletes ===
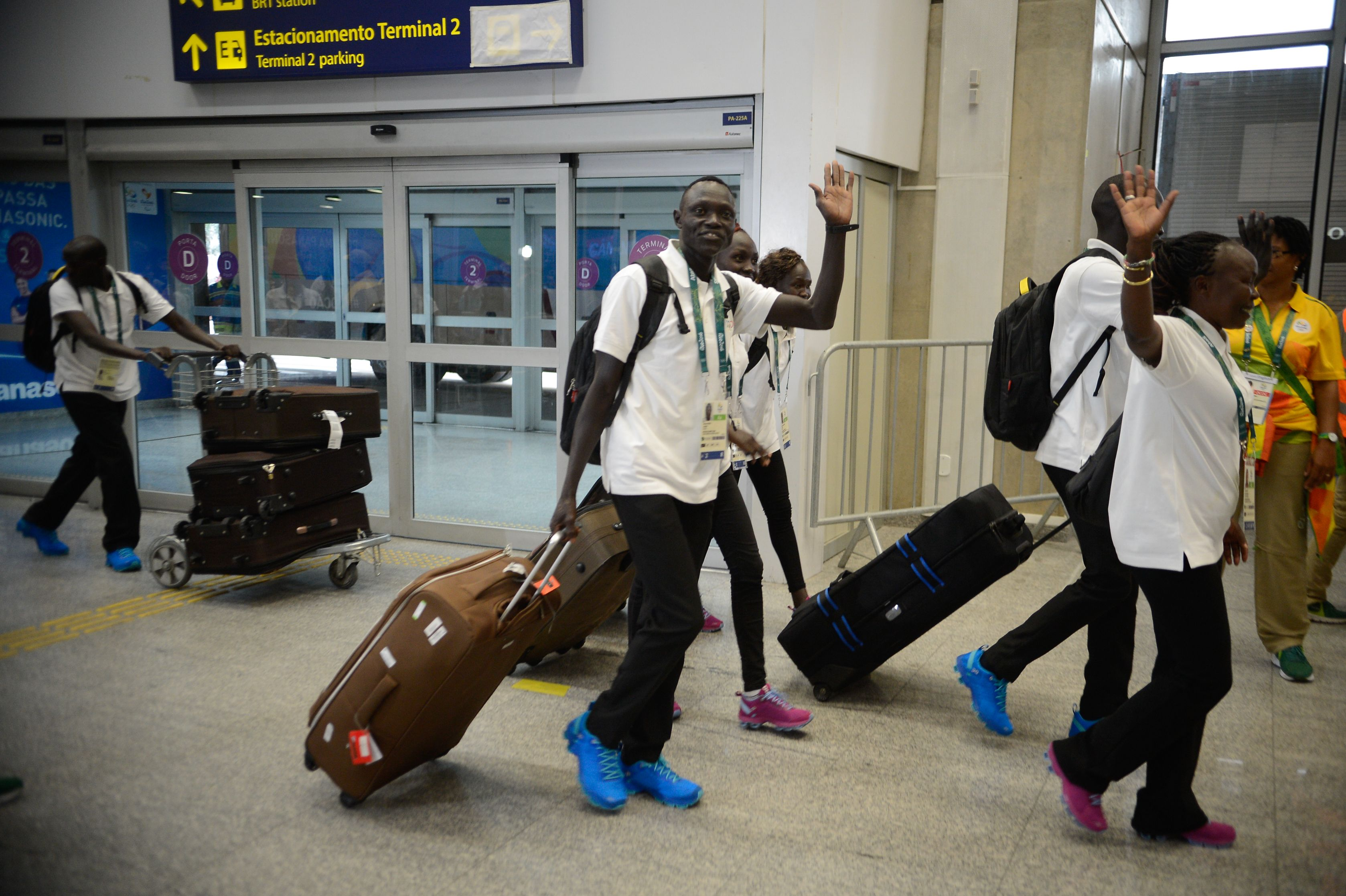
Refugee Olympic team arriving in Rio de Janeiro

Due to the European migrant crisis and other reasons, the IOC allowed athletes to compete as Independent Olympians under the Olympic Flag. During the previous Summer Olympic Games, refugees were ineligible to compete because of their inability to represent their home NOCs. On 2 March 2016, the IOC finalized plans for a specific Refugee Olympic Team (ROT); out of 43 refugee athletes deemed potentially eligible, 10 were chosen to form the team.

=== Independent athletes ===
Due to the suspension of the National Olympic Committee of Kuwait, participants from Kuwait were allowed to participate under the Olympic Flag as Independent Olympic Athletes.

In November 2015, Russia was provisionally suspended from all international track and field athletic competitions by the International Association of Athletics Federations (IAAF) following a World Anti-Doping Agency (WADA) report into a doping program in the country. The IAAF announced that it would allow individual Russian athletes to apply for "exceptional eligibility" to participate in the Games as "neutral" athletes if it was independently verified that they had not engaged in doping nor in the Russian doping program.

On 24 July 2016, the IOC rejected the IAAF and WADA's recommendations to allow athletes to compete neutrally, stating that the Olympic Charter "does not foresee such 'neutral athletes'" and that it was each country's National Olympic Committee decision on which athletes would be competing. As a result, Russian athletes competed under the Russian flag, although they would compete under a neutral flag in the 2018 Winter Olympics following several developments concerning the doping investigation.

==== National houses ====
During the Games, some countries and continents had a national house. These temporary meeting places for supporters, athletes and other followers were located throughout Rio de Janeiro.

Nation	Location	Name
Africa House	Barra da Tijuca	Casa da África
Australia	Rio de Janeiro Stock Exchange Convention Center	Casa da Austrália
Austria	Botafogo	Casa da Áustria
Brazil	Gamboa	Casa do Brasil
Colombia	Centro	Casa da Colômbia
Czech Republic	Barra da Tijuca	Casa da República Tcheca
Denmark	Ipanema	Pavilhão Dinamarquês
Finland	Centro	Casa da Finlândia
France	Lagoa	Clube da França
Germany	Leblon	Casa de Praia da Alemanha
Great Britain	Parque Lage, Jardim Botânico	Casa Olímpica da Grã-Bretanha
Hungary	Gávea	Casa da Hungria
Jamaica	Gávea	Casa da Jamaica
Mexico	Centro	Casa do México
Netherlands	Lagoa	Holland Heineken House (Casa da Holanda)
Portugal	Centro	Casa de Portugal
PyeongChang 2018	Copacabana Beach	Casa de PyeongChang 2018
Qatar	Botafogo	Bayt Quatar
Russia	Copacabana	Casa do Time Olímpico do Rússia
Slovakia	Barra da Tijuca	Casa Eslovaca
Tokyo 2020	Barra da Tijuca	Casa de Tóquio 2020
Tokyo Metropolitan Government	Paço Imperial	Casa do Governo Metropolitano de Tóquio

== Calendar ==
This is currently based on the schedule released on the same day as ticket sales began, 31 March 2015.

All dates are Brasília Time (UTC–3)

OC	Opening ceremony	●	Event competitions	1	Gold medal events	EG	Exhibition gala	CC	Closing ceremony

August 2016		3rd Wed	4th Thu	5th Fri	6th Sat	7th Sun	8th Mon	9th Tue	10th Wed	11th Thu	12th Fri	13th Sat	14th Sun	15th Mon	16th Tue	17th Wed	18th Thu	19th Fri	20th Sat	21st Sun	Events
Ceremonies				OC																CC	—N/a
Aquatics
Aquatics	Diving					1	1	1	1		●	●	1	●	1	●	1	●	1		46
Aquatics	Marathon swimming													1	1						46
Aquatics	Swimming				4	4	4	4	4	4	4	4									46
Aquatics	Synchronized swimming												●	●	1		●	1			46
Aquatics	Water polo				●		●	●	●	●	●	●	●	●	●	●	●	1	1		46
Archery				●	1	1	●	●	●	1	1										4
Athletics											3	5	4	5	5	4	6	7	7	1	47
Badminton										●	●	●	●	●	●	1	1	2	1		5
Basketball					●	●	●	●	●	●	●	●	●	●	●	●	●	●	1	1	2
Boxing					●	●	●	●	●	●	●	●	1	1	1	1	1	1	3	4	13
Canoeing	Slalom					●	●	1	1	2											16
Canoeing	Sprint													●	4	●	4	●	4		16
Cycling	Road cycling				1	1			2												18
Cycling	Track cycling									1	2	2	1	1	3						18
Cycling	BMX															●	●	2			18
Cycling	Mountain biking																		1	1	18
Equestrian					●	●	●	2	●	●	1		●	1	●	1		1			6
Fencing					1	1	1	1	2	1	1	1	1								10
Field hockey					●	●	●	●	●	●	●	●	●	●	●	●	1	1			2
Football		●	●		●	●		●	●		●	●			●	●		1	1		2
Golf										●	●	●	1			●	●	●	1		2
Gymnastics	Artistic				●	●	1	1	1	1			4	3	3	EG					18
Gymnastics	Rhythmic																	●	1	1	18
Gymnastics	Trampolining										1	1									18
Handball					●	●	●	●	●	●	●	●	●	●	●	●	●	●	1	1	2
Judo					2	2	2	2	2	2	2										14
Modern pentathlon																	●	1	1		2
Rowing					●	●	●	●	2	4	4	4									14
Rugby sevens					●	●	1	●	●	1											2
Sailing							●	●	●	●	●	●	2	2	2	2	2				10
Shooting					2	2	2	1	2	1	2	2	1								15
Table tennis					●	●	●	●	1	1	●	●	●	●	1	1					4
Taekwondo																2	2	2	2		8
Tennis					●	●	●	●	●	●	1	1	3								5
Triathlon																	1		1		2
Volleyball	Beach volleyball				●	●	●	●	●	●	●	●	●	●	●	1	1				4
Volleyball	Indoor volleyball				●	●	●	●	●	●	●	●	●	●	●	●	●	●	1	1	4
Weightlifting					1	2	2	2	2		2	1	1	1	1						15
Wrestling													2	2	2	3	3	2	2	2	18
Daily medal events					12	14	14	15	20	19	24	21	22	17	25	16	23	22	30	12	306
Cumulative total					12	26	40	55	75	94	118	139	161	178	203	219	242	264	294	306	306
August 2016		3rd Wed	4th Thu	5th Fri	6th Sat	7th Sun	8th Mon	9th Tue	10th Wed	11th Thu	12th Fri	13th Sat	14th Sun	15th Mon	16th Tue	17th Wed	18th Thu	19th Fri	20th Sat	21st Sun	Events

== Medal table ==
The top ten listed NOCs by the number of gold medals are listed below. Host nation Brazil finished in 13th place with a total of 19 medals (7 gold, 6 silver, and 6 bronze).

Key

‡ Changes in medal standings (see here)

* Host nation (Brazil)

2016 Summer Olympics medal table (Note: Figures in table reflect all official changes in medal standings.)
Rank	NOC	Gold	Silver	Bronze	Total
1	United States	46	37	38	121
2	Great Britain	27	23	17	67
3	China	26	18	26	70
4	Russia‡	19	17	20	56
5	Germany	17	10	15	42
6	Japan	12	8	21	41
7	France	10	18	14	42
8	South Korea	9	3	9	21
9	Italy	8	12	8	28
10	Australia	8	11	10	29
11–86	Remaining NOCs	124	150	181	455
Totals (86 entries)		306	307	359	972

=== Podium sweeps ===
Date	Sport	Event	Team	Gold	Silver	Bronze
17 August	Athletics	Women's 100-meter hurdles	United States	Brianna Rollins	Nia Ali	Kristi Castlin

== Broadcasting ==
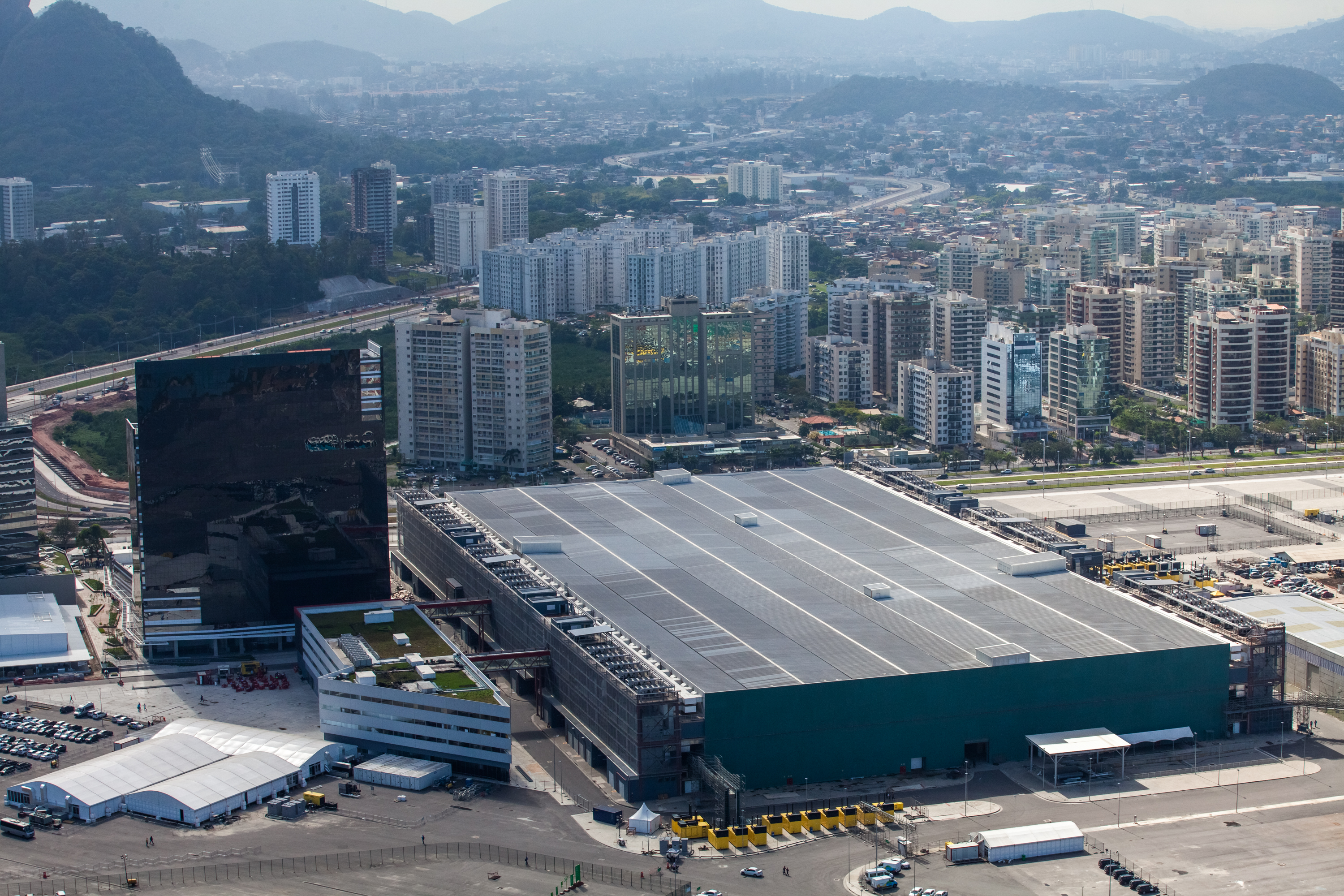
International Broadcast Centre (right) at Barra Olympic Park

Olympic Broadcasting Services served as the host broadcaster for the 2016 Games. Produced from a total of seven mobile units, OBS distributed 40,000 hours of television footage and 60,000 hours of digital footage of the Games to its international rightsholders. For the first time in Olympic history, digital-oriented footage exceeded the amount of television-oriented footage. The International Broadcast Centre was constructed in the Barra da Tijuca cluster. NHK and OBS once again filmed portions of the Games, including the opening ceremony and selected events, in 8K resolution video. Additionally, expanding upon a 180-degree trial at the 2016 Winter Youth Olympics, 85 hours of video content were originated in 360-degree virtual reality formats. In the United States, NBCUniversal offered 4K content downconverted from the 8K footage and with HDR and Dolby Atmos support, to participating television providers. Owing to their expertise in domestic broadcasts of the new sports introduced in Rio, NBCU and Sky New Zealand staff handled the production of the golf and rugby sevens events on behalf of OBS.

In August 2009, the IOC reached a deal to sell domestic broadcast rights for the 2016 Summer Olympics to Grupo Globo. Replacing Record, the deal covers free-to-air coverage on Rede Globo, pay TV, and digital rights to the Games. In turn, Globo sublicensed partial free-to-air rights to Record, along with Band. IOC board member Richard Carrión described the agreement as "unprecedented", touting that "by working with Brazil's leading media organizations, we are confident that this represents a great deal for Olympic fans in the region. There will be a huge increase in the amount of Olympic action broadcast, both during and outside Games time, and Brazilians will have more choice of how, when and where they follow their Olympic Games."

=== Olympic Golden Rings Awards ===
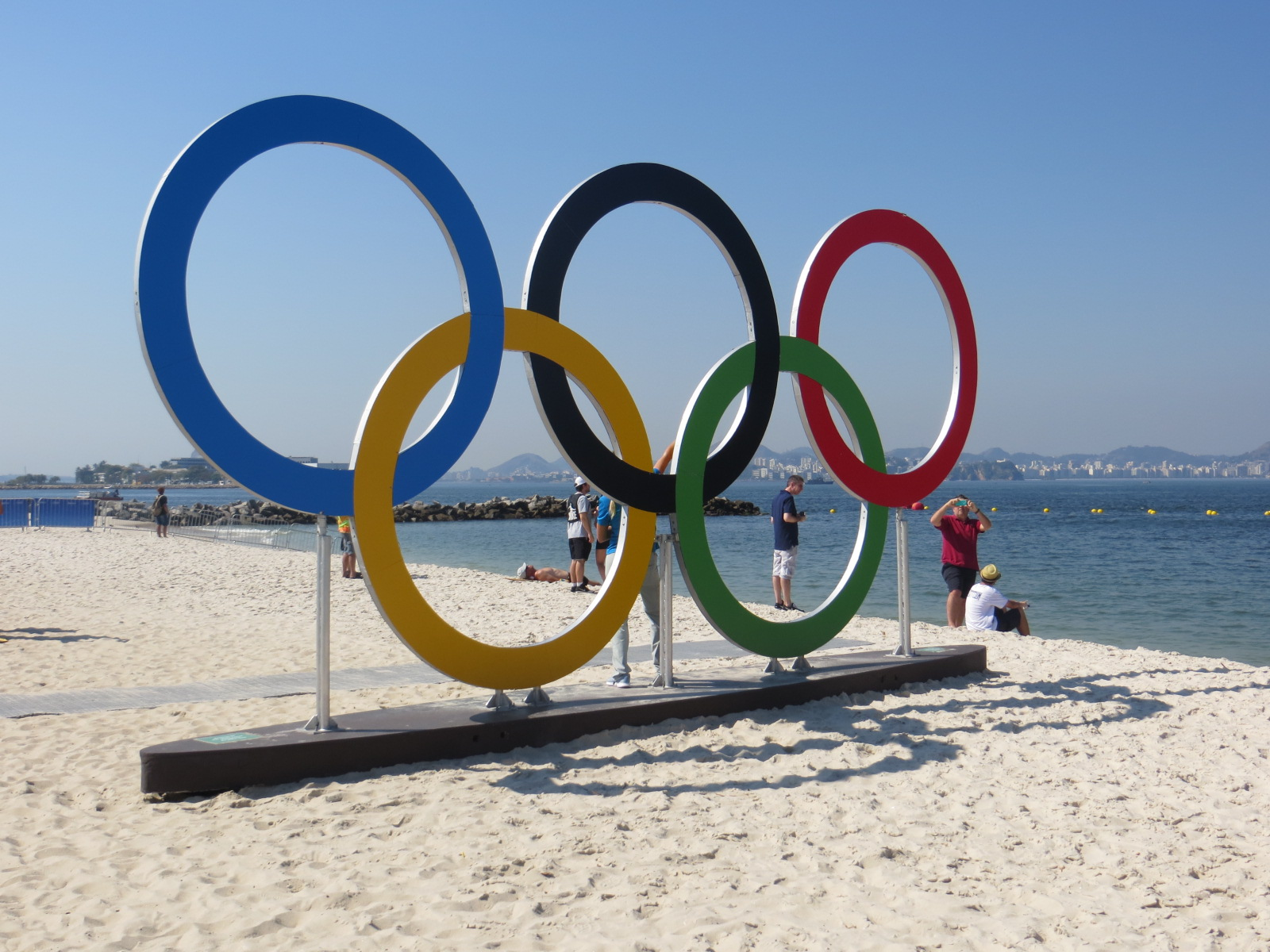
Olympic rings displayed in Rio de Janeiro

In November 2017, the International Olympic Committee announced the winners of the Golden rings in six categories for the best broadcast coverage of the Games. The Best Olympic Sports Production was awarded to Beach Volleyball, produced by Geoff Johnson and directed by Greg Breakell and Gary Milkis. The production for the cycling road race and Sailing came second and third. The next category was the best Olympic feature, for which TV Globo's show Esporte Espetacular finished third, and CCTV China's feature A Sequel of Love came second. The winner was NBC Olympics for their feature The Most Beautiful Thing. The third category was The Best Athlete Profile, for which RTBF from Belgium collected the third place prize for their profile of Nafi Thiam. Globo went one better than the previous category coming second with their profile of Isaquias Queiroz. The winner of the category again was NBC, this time for their piece on Wayde van Niekerk. The Best On-Air Promotion was announced next, with the BBC Sport winning with NBC coming second this time and BNT from Bulgaria finishing third. The Best Olympic Digital Service went to NBC, with ZDF and SporTV/Globosat picking up the second and third places. The Best Olympic Programme was awarded to SporTV/Globosat, while TV Globo and BBC Sport completed the podium.

== Marketing ==
=== Mascots ===
Vinicius and Tom, the mascots of the 2016 Summer Olympics and 2016 Summer Paralympics, respectively

On 24 November 2014, the official mascots of the 2016 Summer Olympics and Paralympics were unveiled, created by São Paulo-based animation company Birdo. The Olympic mascot Vinicius, named after musician Vinicius de Moraes, represents Brazilian wildlife and carries design traits of cats, monkeys, and birds. According to their fictional backgrounds, the mascots "were both born from the joy of Brazilians after it was announced that Rio would host the Games".

Brand director Beth Lula stated that the mascots were intended to reflect the diversity of Brazil's culture and people. The names of the mascots were determined by a public vote whose results were announced on 14 December 2014. The names, which reference the co-writers of the song "The Girl from Ipanema", won over two other sets of names, tallying 44 percent of 323,327 votes. At the Olympic wrestling events, coaches were given plush dolls of Vinicius to throw into the ring when they wished to challenge a referee's call.

=== Emblem ===
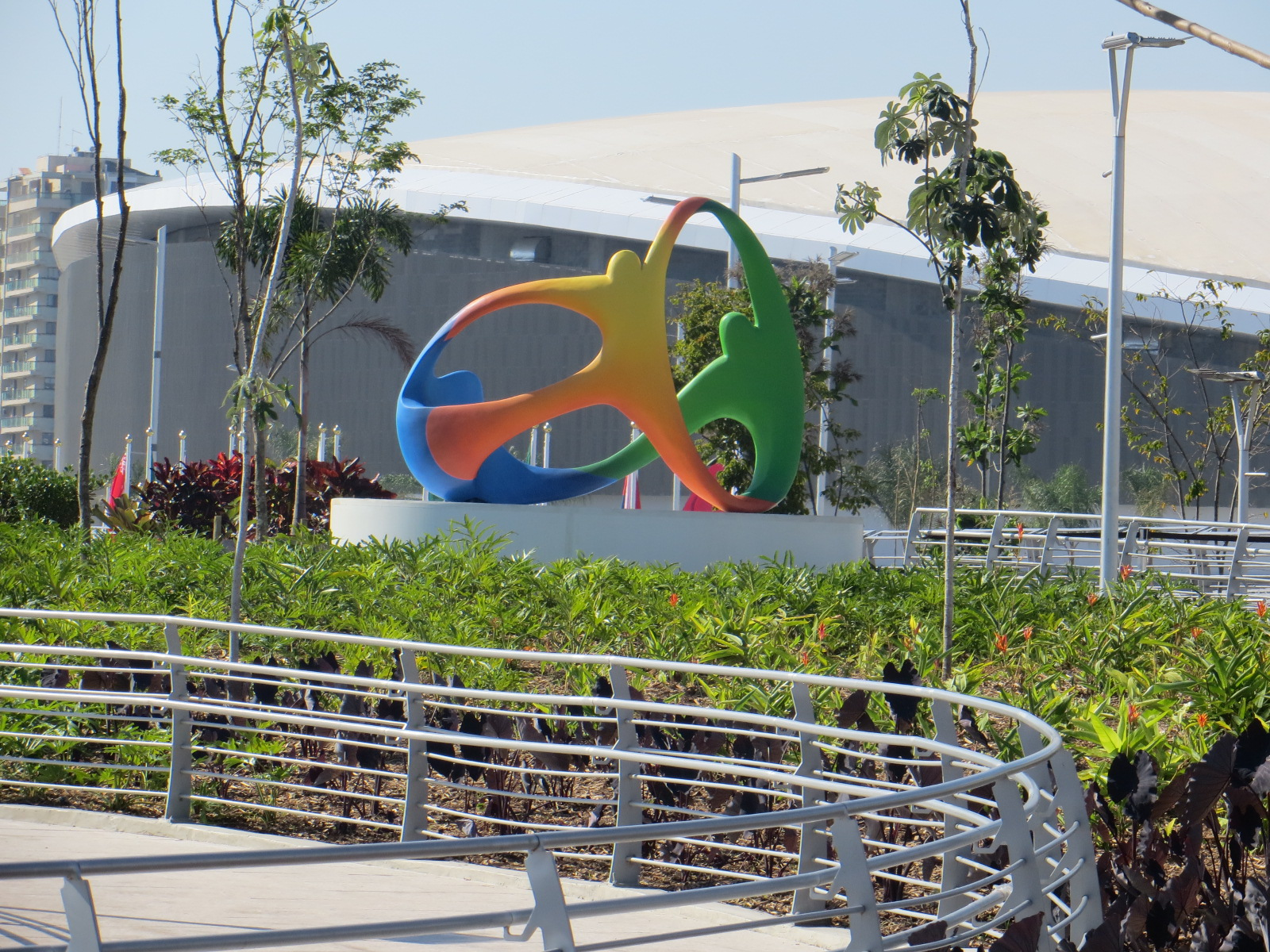
Sculpture of the Rio 2016 logo in Barra Olympic Park

The official emblem for the 2016 Summer Olympics was designed by Brazilian agency Tatíl Design and was unveiled on 31 December 2010, winning in a competition against 139 agencies. The emblem represents three figures joined at their arms and feet, with the overall shape reflecting that of Sugarloaf Mountain. It was also designed to have a three-dimensional form, which designer Fred Gelli claimed made it the first 3D logo in the history of the Olympics.

The logo has been noted as evoking Henri Matisse's painting Dance. There were also allegations by the Colorado-based Telluride Foundation that the logo had been plagiarized from its own; while also consisting of several figures linked in motion, the Telluride Foundation logo contains four figures. This was not the first time that the foundation had alleged plagiarism of its logo by a Brazilian event; in 2004, the linked figures element had been copied for the logo of Carnival celebrations in Salvador. Gelli defended the allegations, stating that the concept of figures linked in embrace was not inherently original, as it was "an ancient reference" and "in the collective unconscious". Gelli cited Dance as an influence of the logo's concept and stated that the designers had intentionally aimed to make the interpretation of the concept as dissimilar to others as possible.

== Concerns and controversies ==
The lead-up to the Rio Games was marked by several controversies, including: Brazil's political and economic crisis; the Zika virus epidemic; the significant pollution in the Guanabara Bay; and an ongoing doping scandal involving Russia, which affected the participation of Russian athletes in the Games. However, the Zika virus was not contracted by anyone competing in or attending the Olympics, and the Games went ahead normally with no major incident.

=== Political and economic crisis ===
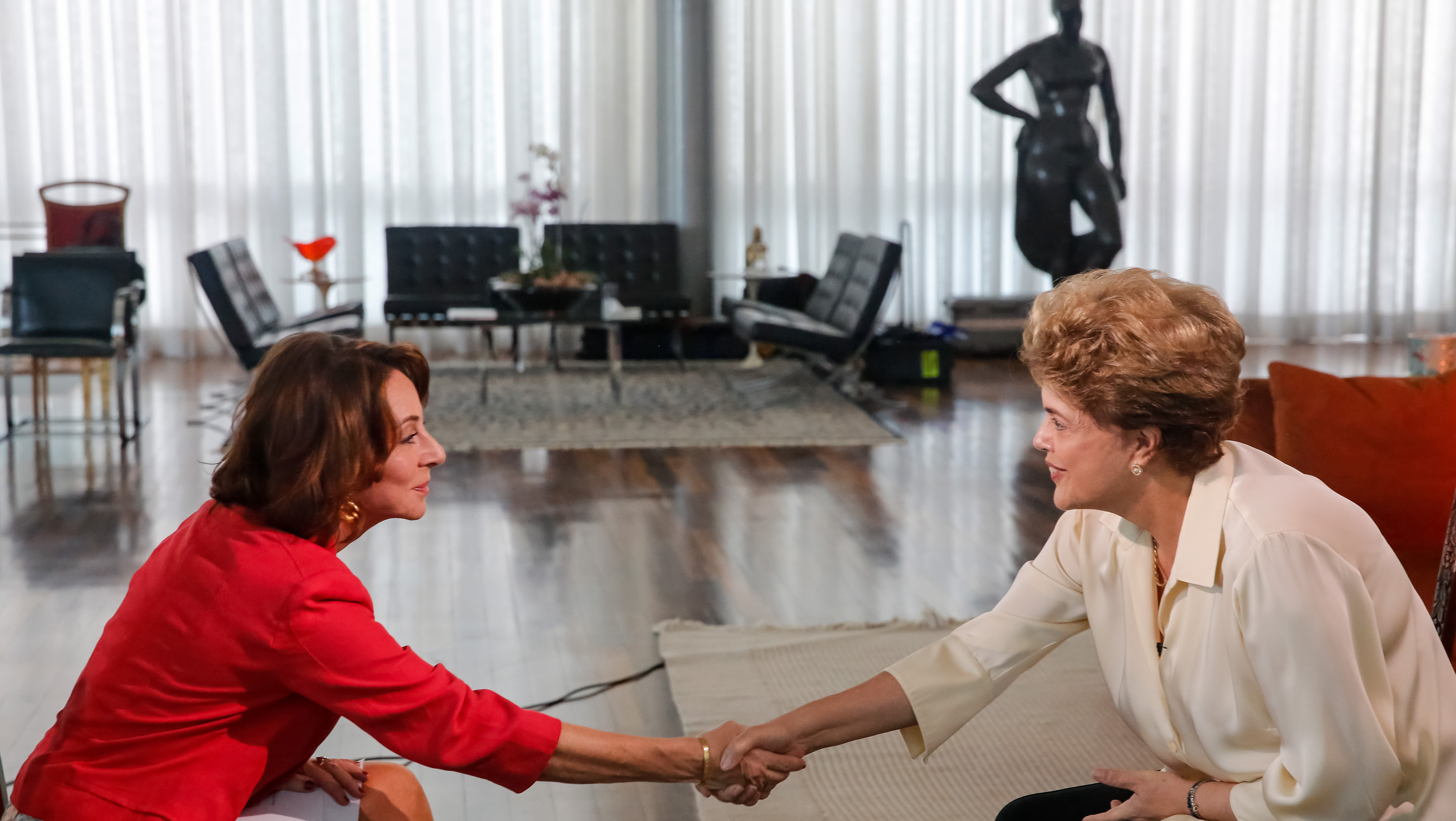
Suspended president Dilma Rousseff during an interview with Al Jazeera at the Alvorada Palace on 1 June 2016

There is no legally legitimate evidence of impropriety in the choice of Rio to host the Olympic games, at least as far as the Brazilian Olympic Committee or the politicians involved in the process are concerned. However, the specialized media raised suspicions about it. In 2014, Operation Car Wash, an investigation by the Federal Police of Brazil, uncovered unprecedented money laundering and corruption at the state-controlled oil company Petrobras. In early 2015, a series of protests against alleged corruption by the government of President Dilma Rousseff began in Brazil, triggered by revelations that numerous politicians were involved in the Petrobras affair. By early 2016, the scandal had escalated into a full-blown political crisis affecting not only President Rousseff, but also former President Luiz Inácio Lula da Silva, resulting in widespread demonstrations involving millions of protesters, both anti- and pro-Rousseff. At the same time, Brazil faced its worst economic recession since the 1990s, raising questions about whether the country was adequately prepared to host the Olympic Games against a volatile political and economic backdrop. On 12 May 2016, President Rousseff was stripped of her powers and duties for 180 days after an impeachment vote in the Federal Senate, with Vice President Michel Temer standing in as acting president during the Games.

On 5 October 2017, Brazilian Olympic Committee head Carlos Nuzman was arrested amid a money-laundering investigation into a $2 million payment that was allegedly made to secure votes for the bid to bring the Olympics to Rio. The money was believed to have been paid to former IAAF president Lamine Diack and his son Papa Massata Diack, who was a member of the IOC at the time of the alleged payment, which was three days before the vote in 2009. All three were charged with money laundering, along with the former Rio state governor Sérgio Cabral Filho (who was already in prison for money laundering offenses at the time), Brazilian businessman Arthur Soares, and ex-Brazilian Olympic Committee chief Leonardo Gryner. All six were charged with running a criminal organization, money laundering, and violating currency laws in their own native countries. On 4 July 2019, it was reported that Cabral told a judge that the money paid to Diack was used to buy as many as nine votes. Rio mayor Eduardo Paes was also accused of corruption and fraud in relation to the construction of a number of venues for the Games. In 2024, Nuzman's and Cabral's conviction in this legal case was overturned by the Court.

=== Zika virus ===
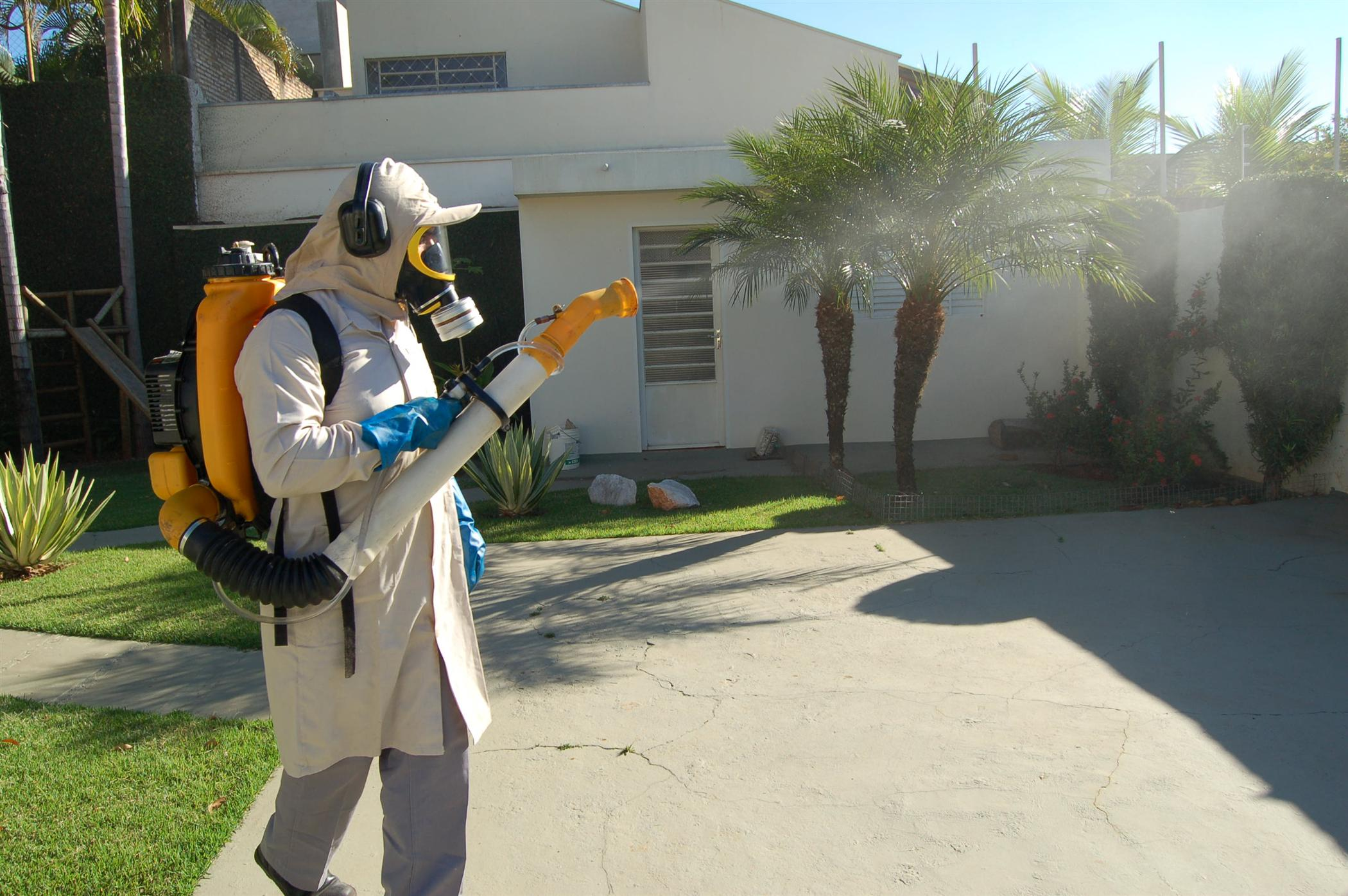
Agent for endemic diseases of the city of Votuporanga, São Paulo

An outbreak of the mosquito-borne Zika virus in Brazil raised fears regarding its potential impact on athletes and visitors. To prevent puddles of stagnant water that allow mosquitoes to breed, organizers announced plans to perform daily inspections of Olympic venues. Zika virus transmission was also attributed to inefficient sewage treatment in the area, an issue that was also in the process of being addressed for the Games.

In May 2016, a group of 150 physicians and scientists sent an open letter to the World Health Organization (WHO), calling upon them to, according to co-author Arthur Caplan, have "an open, transparent discussion of the risks of holding the Olympics as planned in Brazil". The WHO dismissed the request, stating that "cancelling or changing the location of the 2016 Olympics [would] not significantly alter the international spread of Zika virus", and that there was "no public health justification" for postponing them.

Some athletes did not attend the Games because of the epidemic. On 2 September 2016, however, the World Health Organization reported that there were no confirmed cases of Zika among athletes or visitors during the 2016 Olympics.

=== Environmental problems ===
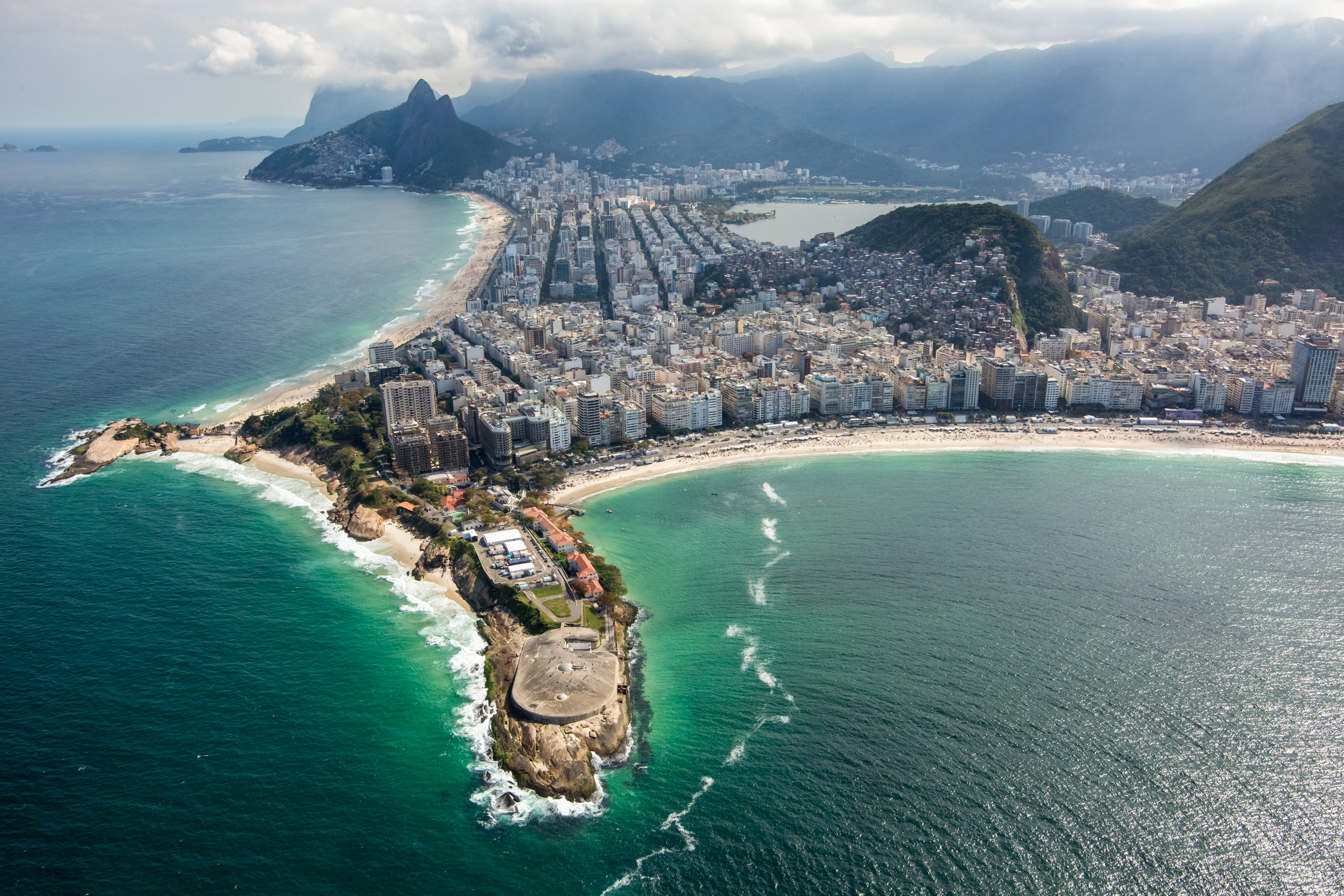
Fort Copacabana hosted the cycling road race (start and finish), marathon swimming and triathlon events.

The Guanabara Bay, whose waters were used for sailing and windsurfing competitions, is heavily polluted. Among the chief causes of the pollution are uncollected trash fed into the bay via polluted rivers and slums along the coast. Pollution of the Guanabara has been a long-term issue. At the Earth Summit in 1992, officials promised they would begin to address the pollution, but previous attempts to do so have been insufficient. As an aspect of their bid for the Games, Rio once again committed to making efforts towards cleaning the bay. However, some of these proposed initiatives have faced budgetary issues. Prior to these efforts, only 17% of Rio's sewage was treated; this raw sewage also leaked into the bay. Although Rio mayor Eduardo Paes stated that the city might not be able to reach its goal of having 80% of sewage treated, at least 60% of sewage was treated by March 2016, with a projected goal of 65% of sewage being treated by the start of the Olympics.

=== Security ===
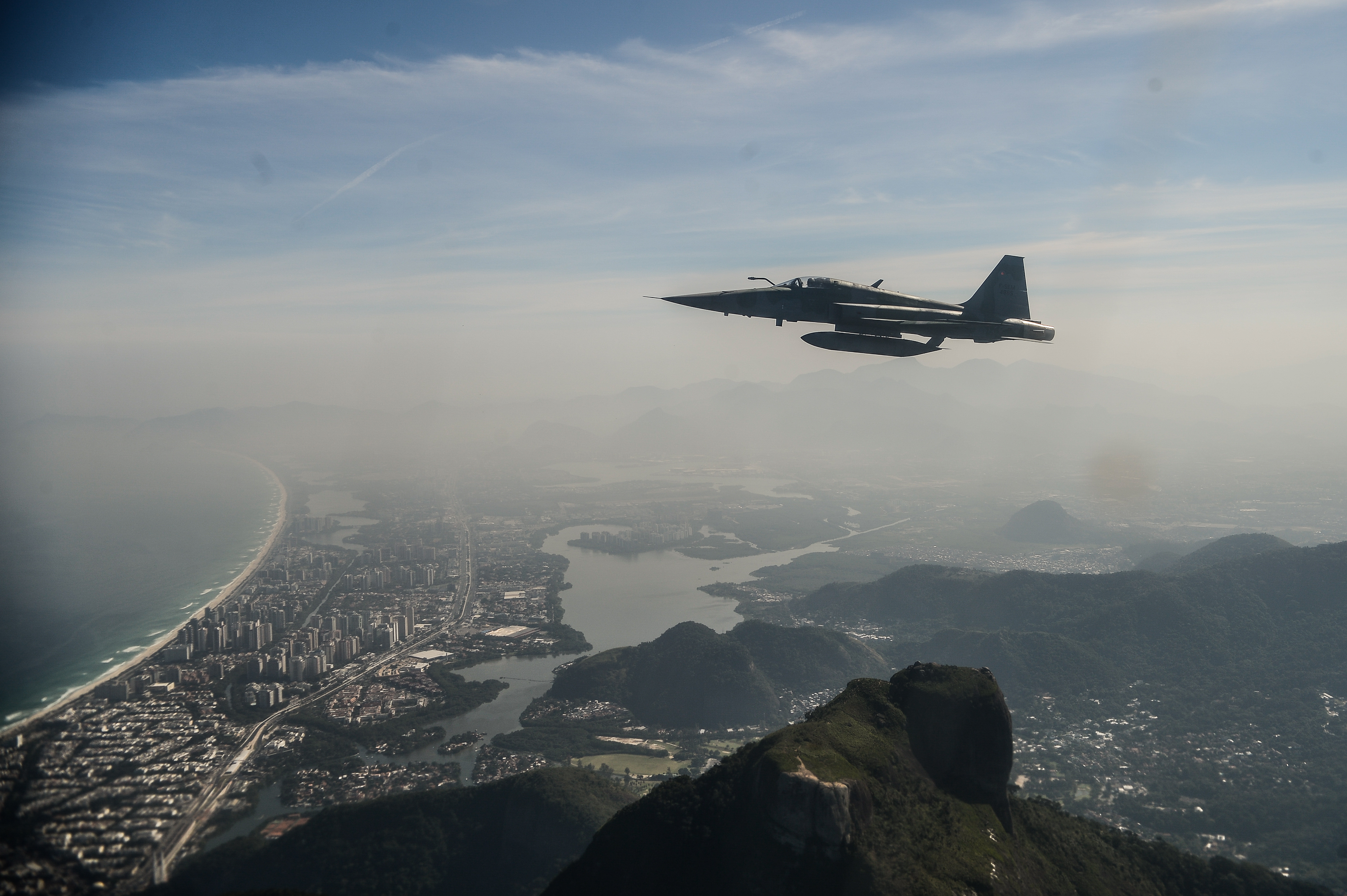
F-5EM Tiger II fighter jet of the Brazilian Air Force during an air intercept training for Rio 2016

Rio's crime problems also received renewed attention after it was awarded the 2016 Games; mayor Paes stated that the city was facing "big issues" in heightening security, but that such concerns and issues were presented to the IOC throughout the bidding process.

The governor of Rio de Janeiro also highlighted the fact that London faced security problems, with a terrorist attack occurring just a day after it was awarded the 2012 Summer Olympics. The estimate was that 5,000 men of the National Public Security Force and 22,000 military officers (14,800 Army; 5,900 Navy and 1,300 of the Brazilian Air Force), in addition to the fixed quota of Rio January, would act during the Olympic Games.

On 21 July 2016, two weeks before the scheduled start of the Games, the Brazilian Federal Police broke up an Islamic jihadist terrorist cell named Ansar al-Khilafah Brazil by arresting 12 people.

=== Russian doping scandal ===
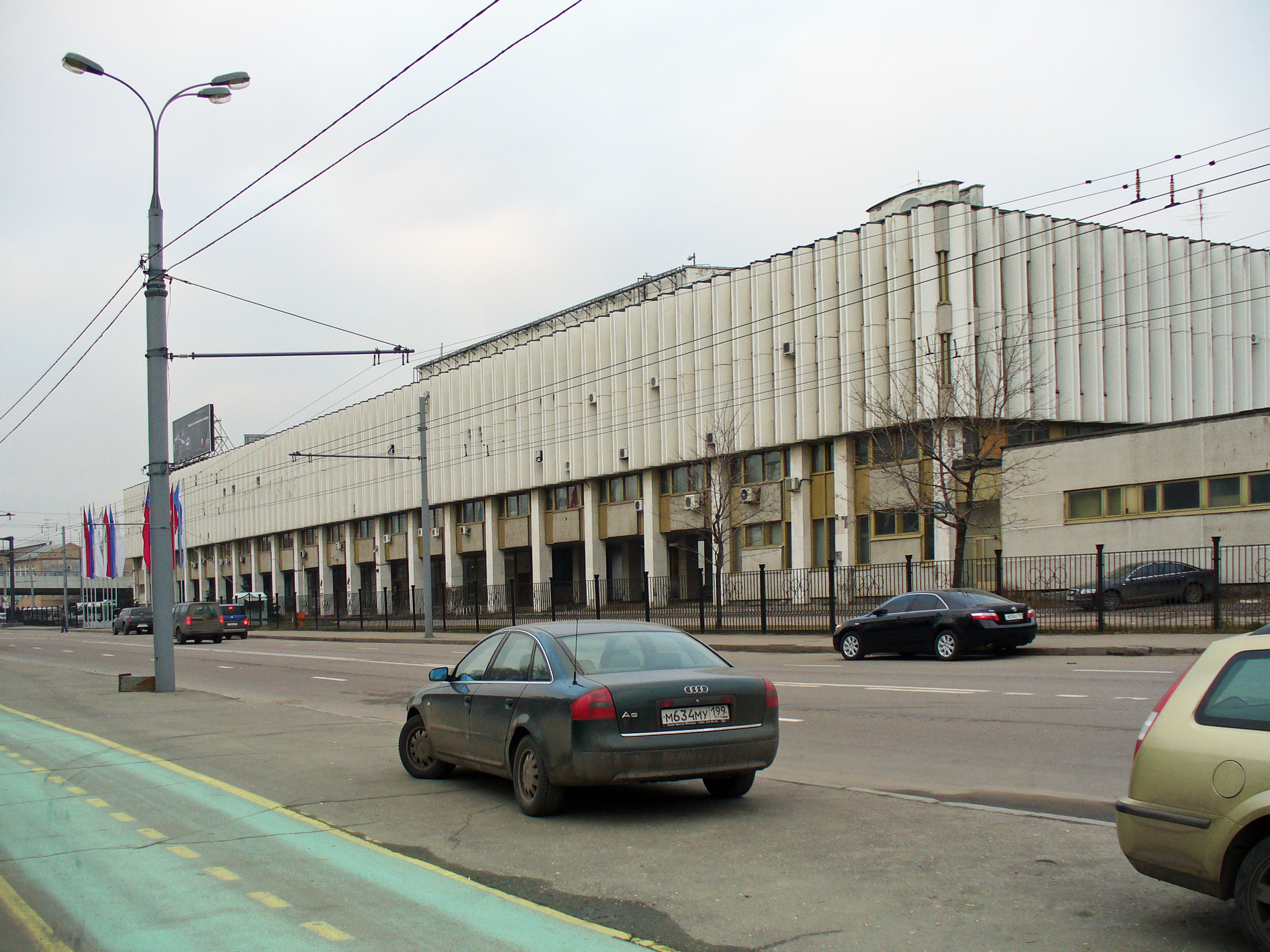
Headquarters of the Russian Olympic Committee in Moscow

In December 2014, media attention began growing when German broadcaster ARD reported on state-sponsored doping in Russia, comparing it to doping in East Germany. In November 2015, the World Anti-Doping Agency (WADA) published a report, and the International Association of Athletics Federations (IAAF) suspended Russia indefinitely from world track and field events. The United Kingdom Anti-Doping agency later assisted WADA with testing in Russia. In June 2016, they reported they were unable to fully carry out their work, and noted intimidation by armed Federal Security Service (FSB) agents. After a Russian former lab director made allegations about the 2014 Winter Olympics in Sochi, WADA commissioned an independent investigation led by Richard McLaren, which found corroborating evidence, concluding in a report published in July 2016 that the Ministry of Sport and the FSB had operated a "state-directed failsafe system" using a "disappearing positive [test] methodology" (DPM) from "at least late 2011 to August 2015".

In response to these findings, WADA announced that RUSADA should be regarded as non-compliant with respect to the World Anti-Doping Code, and recommended that Russia be banned from competing in the 2016 Summer Olympics. The IOC rejected the recommendation, stating that the IOC and each sport's international federation would make decisions on each athlete's individual basis. A day before the opening ceremony, 278 athletes were cleared to compete under the Russian flag, while 111 were removed because of doping. In contrast, the entire Kuwaiti team was banned from competing under their own flag for a non-doping related matter. Unlike the IOC, the International Paralympic Committee voted unanimously to ban the entire Russian team from the 2016 Summer Paralympics, and suspended the Russian Paralympic Committee after it found evidence that the DPM was also in operation at the 2014 Winter Paralympics.

== See also ==
- 2016 Summer Paralympics
- List of IOC country codes

== Notes ==
Summer Olympics
Preceded by London	XXXI Olympiad; Rio de Janeiro; 2016	Succeeded by Tokyo
