= List of Summer Olympics venues: O =

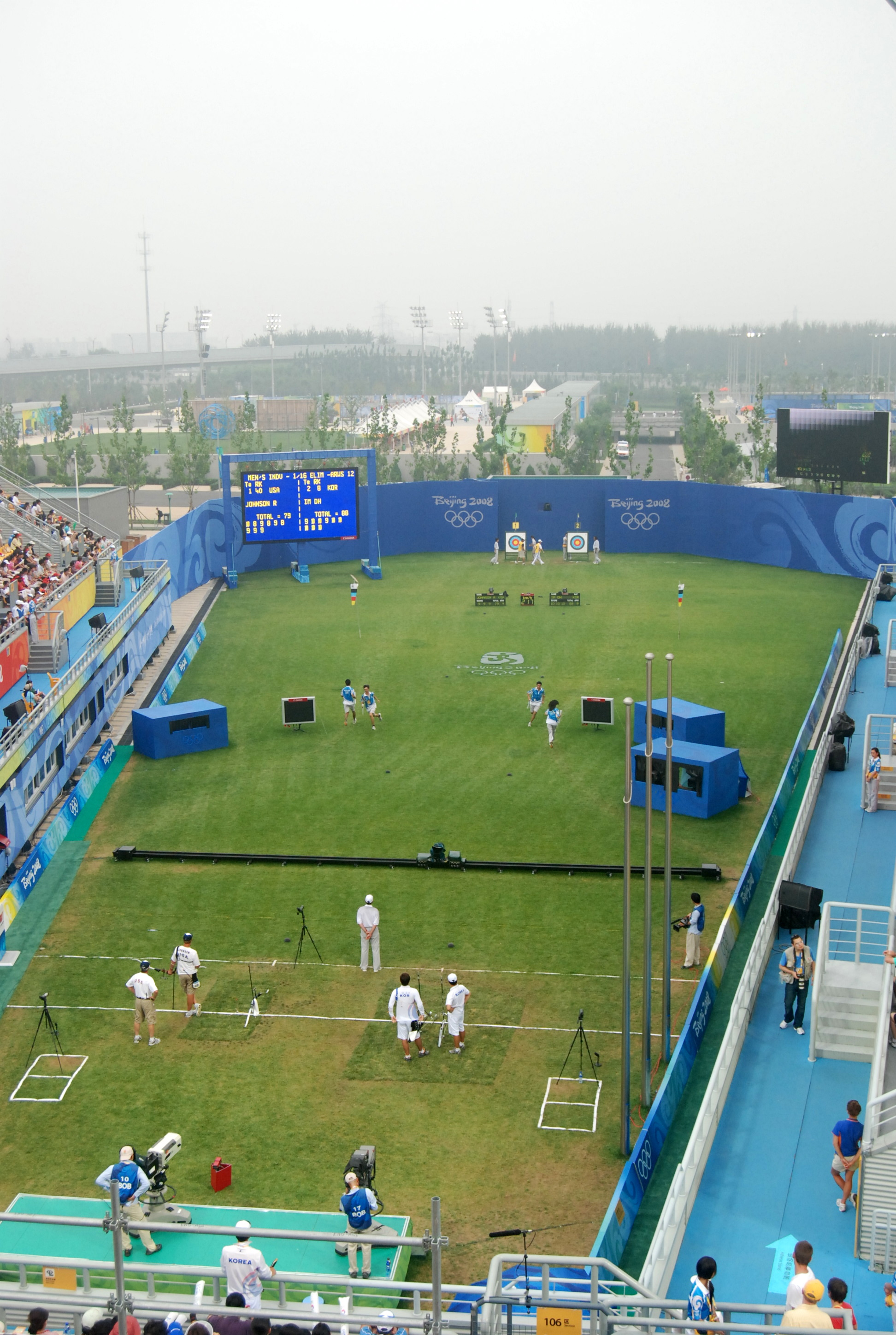
Olympic Green Archery Field hosted the archery competitions for the 2008 Summer Olympics in Beijing.

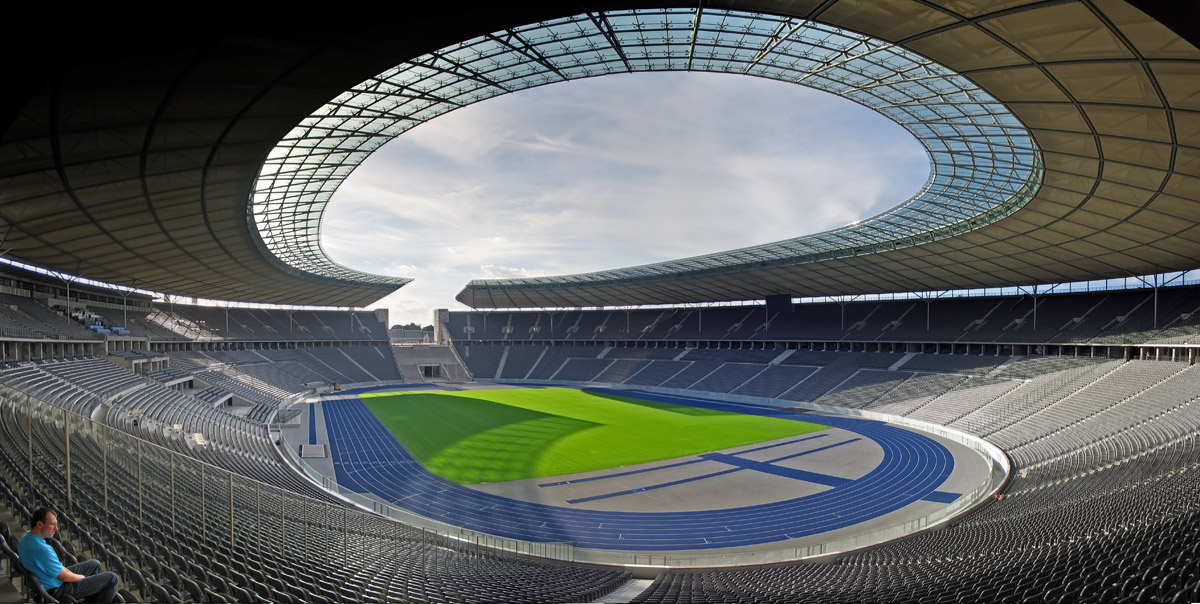
Berlin's Olympic Stadium in 2007. For the 1936 Summer Olympics, the venue hosted athletics, equestrian jumping, and the finals for both football and handball.

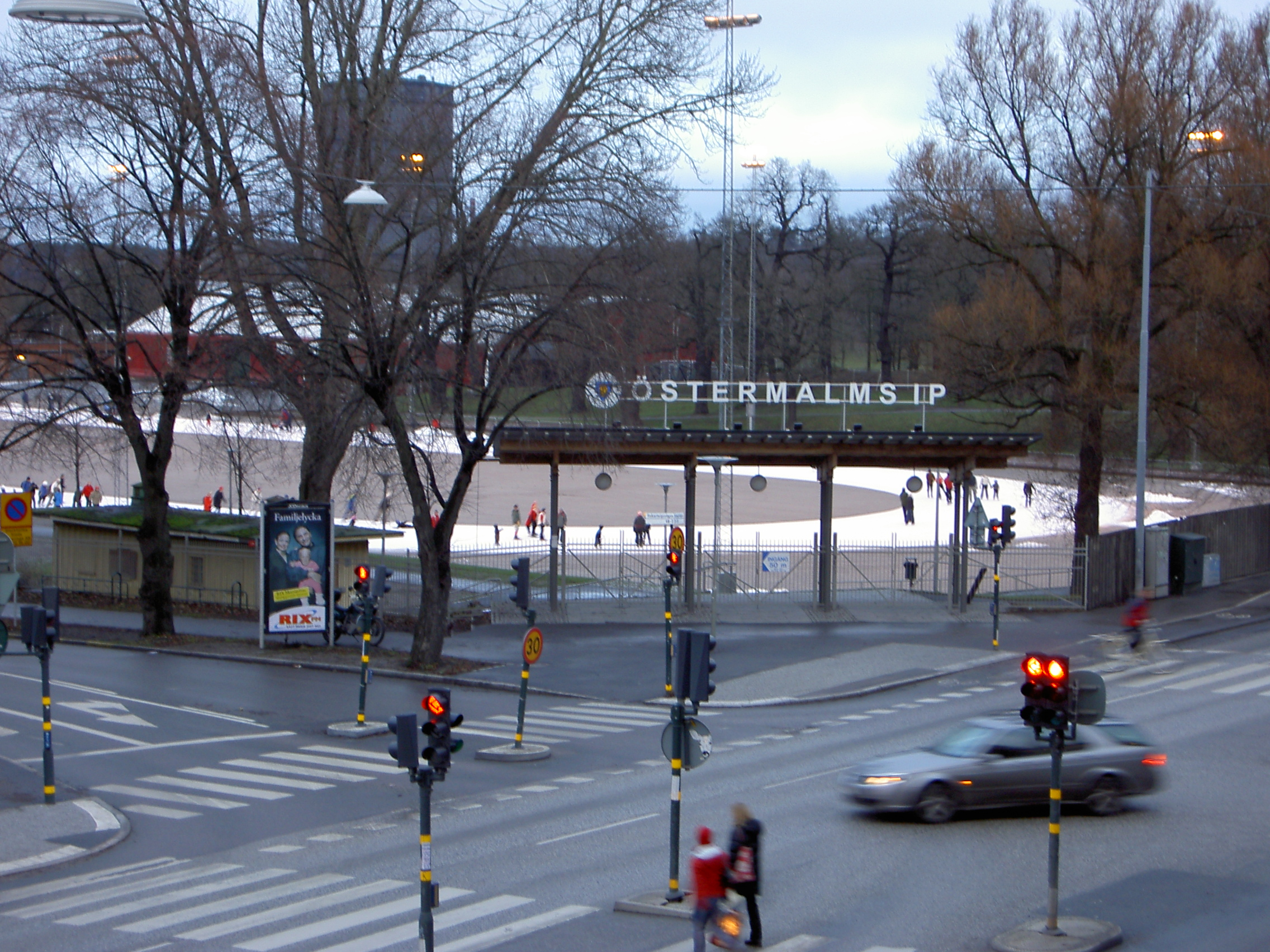
Östermalm Athletic Grounds in Stockholm in 2007. For the 1912 Summer Olympics, the venue hosted the equestrian, fencing, modern pentathlon fencing, and tennis competitions.

For the Summer Olympics, there are a total of 66 venues starting with the letter 'O'.

Venue	Games	Sports	Capacity	Ref.
Oaklands Hunt Club	1956 Melbourne	Modern pentathlon (riding, running)	25,700	
Ocoee Whitewater Center	1996 Atlanta	Canoeing (slalom)	14,400	
Old Stadion	1928 Amsterdam	Field hockey	29,000	
Old Trafford	2012 London	Football	76,000	
Olympiahalle	1972 Munich	Gymnastics, Handball (final)	10.563	
Olympiastadion	1972 Munich	Athletics, Ceremonies (opening/ closing), Equestrian (jumping team), Football (final), Modern pentathlon (running)	77,000	
Olympic Aquatics Stadium	2016 Rio de Janeiro	Swimming, Synchronized swimming	18,000	
Olympic Archery Field, Joliette	1976 Montreal	Archery	2,000	
Olympic Auditorium	1932 Los Angeles	Boxing, Weightlifting, Wrestling	10,000.	
Olympic Baseball Centre	2004 Athens	Baseball	Not listed.	
Olympic BMX Centre	2016 Rio de Janeiro	Cycling (BMX)	7,500	
Olympic Canoe/Kayak Slalom Centre	2004 Athens	Canoeing (slalom)	3,150	
Olympic Equestrian Centre, Bromont	1976 Montreal	Equestrian (all events but jumping team final), Modern pentathlon (riding)	35,000	
Olympic Fencing Gymnasium	1988 Seoul	Fencing, Modern pentathlon (fencing)	7,000	
Olympic Green Archery Field	2008 Beijing	Archery	5,000	
Olympic Green Convention Center	2008 Beijing	Fencing, Modern pentathlon (fencing, shooting)	5,695	
Olympic Green Hockey Field	2008 Beijing	Field hockey	17,000	
Olympic Green Tennis Center	2008 Beijing	Tennis	17,400	
Olympic Gymnastics Hall	1988 Seoul	Gymnastics	14,730	
Olympic Harbour	1992 Barcelona	Sailing	Not listed.	
Olympic Hockey Centre	2004 Athens	Field hockey	20,000	
Olympic Hockey Centre	2016 Rio de Janeiro	Field hockey	15,000	
Olympic Indoor Hall	2004 Athens	Basketball (final), Gymnastics (artistic, trampolining)	19,250	
Olympic Modern Pentathlon Centre	2004 Athens	Modern pentathlon	10,000	
Olympic Mountain Bike Park	2016 Rio de Janeiro	Cycling (mountain bike)	5,000	
Olympic Park Stadium	1956 Melbourne	Football	40,000	
Olympic Pool	1976 Montreal	Diving, Modern pentathlon (swimming), Swimming, Water polo (final)	10,000	
Olympic Regatta in Tallinn	1980 Moscow	Sailing	Not listed	
Olympic Sailing Shore Base	2000 Sydney	Sailing	10,000	
Olympic Shooting Range, L'Acadie	1976 Montreal	Modern pentathlon (shooting), Shooting	1,000	
Olympic Softball Stadium	2004 Athens	Softball	Not listed.	
Olympic Sports Centre	2008 Beijing	Football, Modern Pentathlon (riding, running)	36,228	
Olympic Sports Center Gymnasium	2008 Beijing	Handball	7,000	
Olympic Sports Park Swim Stadium	1928 Amsterdam	Diving, Modern pentathlon (swimming), Swimming, Water polo	4,440	
Olympic Stadium	1928 Amsterdam	Athletics, Cycling (track), Equestrian (jumping), Football (final), Gymnastics	31,600	
Olympic Stadium	1932 Los Angeles	Athletics, Equestrian (eventing, jumping), Field hockey, Gymnastics	105,000	
Olympic Stadium	1936 Berlin	Athletics, Equestrian (jumping), Football (final), Handball (final)	100,000	
Olympic Stadium	1952 Helsinki	Athletics, Equestrian (jumping), Football (final)	70,000	
Olympic Stadium	1956 Stockholm	Equestrian (dressage, eventing, jumping)	6,000	
Olympic Stadium	1976 Montreal	Athletics, Ceremonies (opening/ closing), Equestrian (jumping team final), Football (final)	70,000	
Olympic Stadium	1988 Seoul	Athletics, Equestrian (jumping individual final), Football (final)	69,950	
Olympic Stadium	1996 Atlanta	Athletics, Ceremonies (opening/ closing)	85,600	
Olympic Stadium	2000 Sydney	Ceremonies (opening/closing), Athletics, Football (final)	110,000	
Olympic Stadium	2004 Athens	Ceremonies (opening/ closing), Athletics, Football (final)	71,030	
Olympic Stadium	2012 London	Athletics, Ceremonies (opening/ closing)	80,000	
Olympic Swim Stadium	1984 Los Angeles	Diving, Swimming, Synchronized swimming	16,500	
Olympic Swimming Stadium	1936 Berlin	Diving, Modern pentathlon (swimming), Swimming, Water polo	20,000.	
Olympic Tennis Center	1988 Seoul	Tennis	15,000	
Olympic Tennis Centre	2016 Rio de Janeiro	Tennis	18,250	
Olympic Training Center – Arena 1	2016 Rio de Janeiro	Basketball	16,000	
Olympic Training Center – Arena 2	2016 Rio de Janeiro	Judo, Taekwondo	10,000	
Olympic Training Center – Arena 3	2016 Rio de Janeiro	Wrestling	10,000	
Olympic Training Center – Arena 4	2016 Rio de Janeiro	Handball	12,000	
Olympic Velodrome	1960 Rome	Cycling (track), Field hockey (final)	20,000	
Olympic Velodrome	1976 Montreal	Cycling (track), Judo	2,600	
Olympic Velodrome	1984 Los Angeles	Cycling (track)	8,400	
Olympic Velodrome	1988 Seoul	Cycling (track)	6,000	
Olympic Weightlifting Gymnasium	1988 Seoul	Weightlifting	4,000	
Olympic Whitewater Stadium	2016 Rio de Janeiro	Canoeing (slalom)	8,000	
Olympisch Stadion	1920 Antwerp	Athletics, Equestrian, Field hockey, Football (final), Gymnastics, Modern pentathlon, Rugby union, Tug of war, Weightlifting	12,771	
Ōmiya Football Field	1964 Tokyo	Football	14,400	
Omni Coliseum	1996 Atlanta	Volleyball (indoor final)	16,500	
Orange Bowl	1996 Atlanta	Football	72,700	
Ostend	1920 Antwerp	Polo, Sailing	Not listed.	
Östermalm Athletic Grounds	1912 Stockholm	Equestrian, Fencing, Modern pentathlon (fencing), Tennis	Not listed.	
