= Olympic Velodrome =

Olympic Velodrome may refer to:

- Herne Hill Velodrome, used for the 1948 Summer Olympics in London
- Helsinki Velodrome, used for the 1952 Summer Olympics in Helsinki
- Melbourne Olympic Velodrome, used for the 1956 Summer Olympics in Melbourne
- Olympic Velodrome, Rome, used for the 1960 Summer Olympics in Rome
- Hachioji Velodrome, used for the 1964 Summer Olympics in Tokyo
- Agustín Melgar Olympic Velodrome, used for the 1968 Summer Olympics in Mexico City
- Radstadion, used for the 1972 Summer Olympics in Munich
- Montreal Olympic Velodrome, used for the 1976 Summer Olympics in Montreal, now the Montreal Biodome
- Krylatskoye Sports Complex Velodrome, used for the 1980 Summer Olympics in Moscow
- Olympic Velodrome (Carson, California), used for the 1984 Summer Olympics in Los Angeles
- Olympic Velodrome (Seoul), used for the 1988 Summer Olympics in Seoul
- Velòdrom d'Horta: used for the 1992 Summer Olympics in Barcelona
- Stone Mountain Park Velodrome: used for the 1996 Summer Olympics in Atlanta
- Dunc Gray Velodrome: used for the 2000 Summer Olympics in Sydney
- Olympic Velodrome (Athens): used for the 2004 Summer Olympics in Athens
- Laoshan Velodrome: used for the 2008 Summer Olympics in Beijing
- London Velopark: used for the 2012 Summer Olympics in London
- Barra Velodrome: used for the 2016 Summer Olympics in Rio de Janeiro
