= List of indoor arenas in Brazil =

The following is a list of indoor arenas in Brazil with a capacity of at least 3,000 spectators. Most of the arenas in this list have multiple uses such as individual sports, team sports as well as cultural events and political events.

== Currently in use ==
Images	Location	Venue	Date built	Capacity	Tenants/use
	Aracaju	Ginásio Constâncio Vieira	1977	5,000	
	Barueri	Ginásio José Corrêa	2004	5,000	
	Bauru	Ginásio Paulo Skaf	2021	5,000	
	Belém	Arena Guilherme Paraense	2016	11,970	
	Belo Horizonte	Estádio Jornalista Felipe Drummond (Mineirinho)	1980	25,000	
	Belo Horizonte	Arena Juscelino Kubitschek	1952	5,000	
	Blumenau	Ginásio Sebastião Cruz	2008	3,000	
	Boa Vista	Ginásio Romero Regueira Jucá	2009	6,500	
	Brasília	Ginásio Nilson Nelson	1973	16,600	
	Campina Grande	Ginásio O Meninão	1992	5,000	
	Campinas	Ginásio Multidisciplinar da UNICAMP	1986	10,000	
	Campo Grande	Ginásio Poliesportivo Avelino dos Reis	1984	8,000	
	Cuiabá	Ginásio Aecim Tocantins	2007	12,000	
	Curitiba	Ginásio do Tarumã	1965	4,555	
	Fortaleza	Centro de Formação Olímpica do Nordeste	2014	17,100	
	Fortaleza	Ginásio Paulo Sarasate	1971	8,822	
	Fortaleza	Centro de Eventos do Ceará	2012	30,000	
	Franca	Polidesportivo do Pedrocão	1975	6,000	
	Goiânia	Arena Goiânia	2002	15,000	
	Gurupi	Ginásio de Esportes Idanizete de Paula	1987	5,000	
	Jaraguá do Sul	Arena Jaraguá	2007	8,000	
	Joao Pessoa	Ginásio Poliesportivo Ronaldo Cunha Lima	1994	3,500	
	Lages	Ginásio Jones Minosso	2002	5,000	
	Londrina	Ginásio do Moringão	1972	13,000	
	Macapá	Ginásio Avertino Ramos	1975	3,000	
	Maceió	Ginásio Poliesportivo Lauthenay Perdigão	1994	10,000	
	Manaus	Arena Amadeu Teixeira	2006	11,800	
	Maringá	Ginásio Chico Neto	1976	4,538	
	Natal	Ginásio Nélio Dias	2008	10,000	
	Olinda	Classic Hall	2001	15,000	
	Palmas	Ginásio Ayrton Senna	1994	3,000	
	Passo Fundo	Ginásio Teixeirinha	2004	10,000	
	Pinhais	Expotrade Arena	2008	20,000	
	Porto Alegre	Ginásio Gigantinho	1973	14,586	
	Porto Velho	Ginásio Cláudio Coutinho	1982	3,000	
	Recife	Ginásio de Esportes Geraldo Magalhães	1970	15,000	
	Rio Branco	Ginásio do SESI	1990s	3,000	
	Rio de Janeiro	Ginásio Gilberto Cardoso (Maracanãzinho)	1954	13,163	
	Rio de Janeiro	Jeunesse Arena	2007	15,000	
	Rio de Janeiro	Carioca Arena 1	2016	16,000	
	Rio de Janeiro	Carioca Arena 2	2016	10,000	
	Rio de Janeiro	Carioca Arena 3	2016	10,000	
	Rio de Janeiro	Qualistage	1994	8,500	
	Santos	Arena Santos	2010	5,000	
	São José dos Campos	Farma Conde Arena	2022	5,000	
	São Luis do Maranhão	Ginásio Georgiana Pflueger	1981	4,500	
	São Paulo	Ginásio do Ibirapuera	1954	20,000	
	São Paulo	Vibra São Paulo	2000	7,000	
	São Paulo	Ginásio Wlamir Marques	1963	7,000	
	São Paulo	Ginásio da Portuguesa	1974	5,000	
	São Paulo	Ginásio do Pacaembu	1940	3,000	
	Taboão da Serra	Ginásio de Esportes Ayrton Senna	1982	4,000	
	Teresina	Ginásio Governador Dirceu Arcoverde	1978	5,000	
	Uberlândia	Ginásio Municipal Tancredo Neves	2007	8,000	
	Vitória	Ginásio do Álvares Cabral	1983	8,500	

== See also ==
- List of football stadiums in Brazil
- List of indoor arenas by capacity
- Lists of stadiums
