= List of Summer Olympics venues: B =

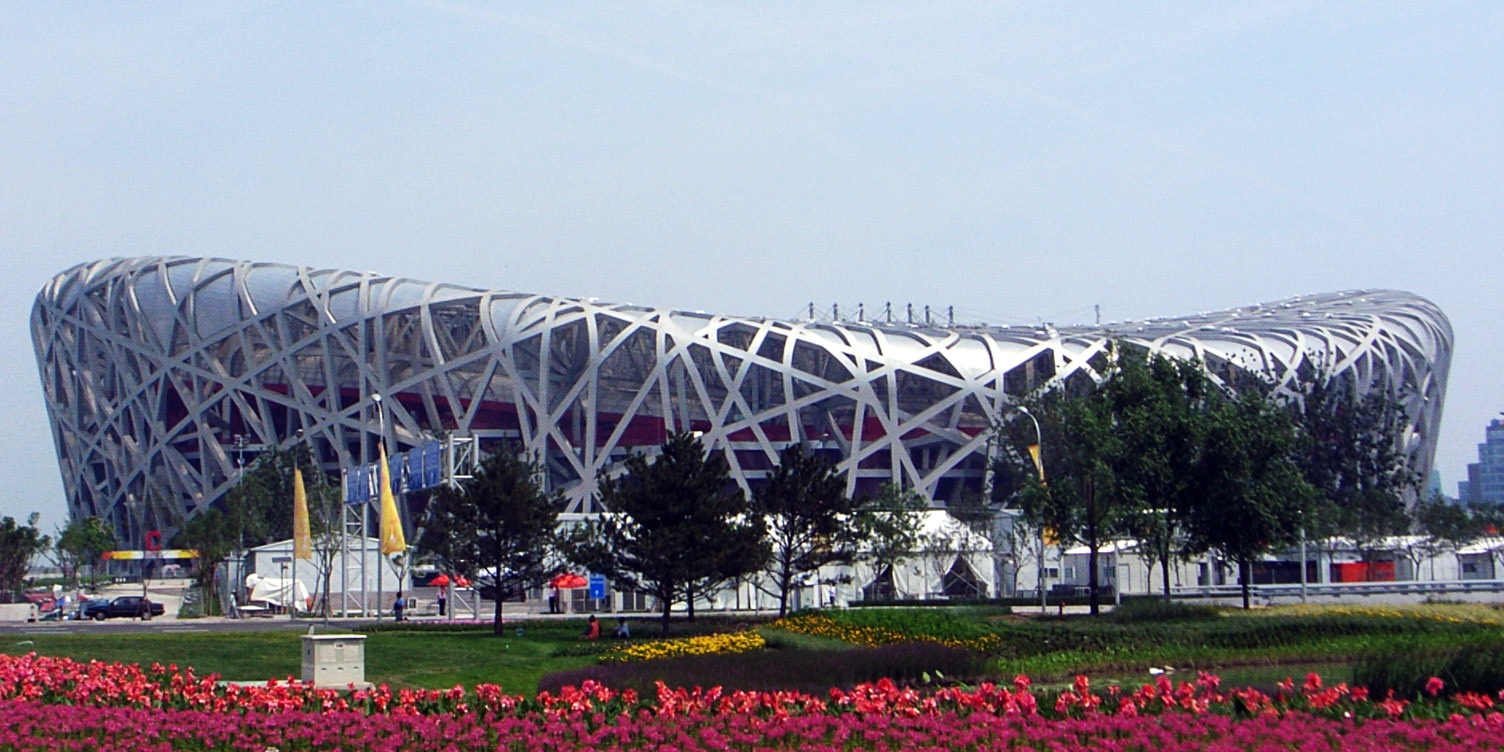
Beijing National Stadium, aka "Bird's Nest", hosted the ceremonies, athletics, and football final for the 2008 Summer Olympics.

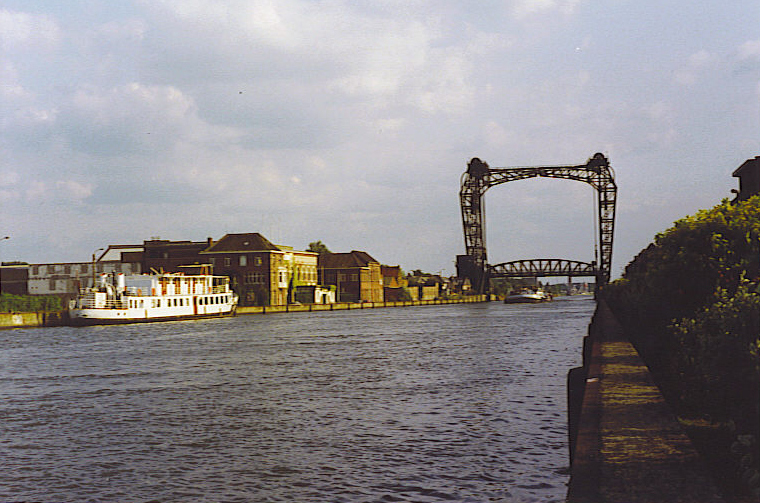
The Brussels-Scheldt Maritime Canal at Willebroek bridge. For the 1920 Summer Olympics in Antwerp, the canal hosted the rowing events.

For the Summer Olympics, there were 43 venues starting with the letter "B".

Venue	Games	Sports	Capacity	Ref.
Bagatelle	1924 Paris	Polo	598	
Banyoles Lake	1992 Barcelona	Rowing	4,500	
Barkarby	1912 Stockholm	Modern pentathlon (riding)	Not listed.	
Barra Velodrome	2016 Rio de Janeiro	Cycling (track)	5,000	
Basketball Arena	2012 London	Basketball, handball (medal round)	12,000	
Basketballhalle	1972 Munich	Basketball, judo	6,635	
Basilica of Maxentius	1960 Rome	Wrestling	5,402	
Bassin d'Argentuil	1924 Paris	Rowing	2,216	
Baths of Caracalla	1960 Rome	Gymnastics	5,402	
Bay of Kiel	1972 Munich	Sailing	4,000 on 14 steamers who wanted to watch the action.	
Bay of Zea	1896 Athens	Swimming	Not listed.	
Beerschot Tennis Club	1920 Antwerp	Tennis	Not listed.	
Beihang University Gymnasium	2008 Beijing	Weightlifting	5,400	
Beijing Institute of Technology Gymnasium	2008 Beijing	Volleyball	5,000	
Beijing National Aquatic Center	2008 Beijing	Diving, swimming and synchronized swimming	17,000	
Beijing National Indoor Stadium	2008 Beijing	Gymnastics (artistic, trampoline), handball (final)	19,000	
Beijing National Stadium	2008 Beijing	Athletics, football (final), opening and closing ceremonies	91,000	
Beijing Science and Technology University Gymnasium	2008 Beijing	Judo, taekwondo	8,024	
Beijing Shooting Range Clay Target Field	2008 Beijing	Shooting (shotgun)	5,000	
Beijing Shooting Range Hall	2008 Beijing	Shooting (pistol, rifle)	9,000	
Beijing University of Technology Gymnasium	2008 Beijing	Badminton, gymnastics (rhythmic)	7,500	
Beverloo Camp	1920 Antwerp	Shooting (pistol/rifle)	Not listed.	
Bisley National Rifle Association Ranges	1948 London	Modern pentathlon (shooting), shooting	Not listed.	
Bisley Ranges	1908 London	Shooting (pistol/rifle)	Not listed.	
Blacktown Olympic Park	2000 Sydney	Baseball, softball	8,000	
BMX Circuit	2012 London	Cycling (BMX)	6,000 (temporary)	
Böblingen Sportshalle	1972 Munich	Handball	Not listed	
Bogenschießlage	1972 Munich	Archery	1,100	
Bois de Boulogne	1900 Paris	Croquet, polo, tug of war	Not listed.	
Bois de Vincennes	1900 Paris	Archery	Not listed.	
Bondi Beach	2000 Sydney	Volleyball (beach)	10,000	
Boulogne-Billancourt	1900 Paris	Shooting	Not listed.	
Boxhalle	1972 Munich	Boxing, judo (final)	7,360	
Brasília National Stadium	2016 Rio de Janeiro	Football	71,500	
Brisbane Cricket Ground	2000 Sydney	Football	37,000	
Brisbane Cricket Ground	2032 Brisbane	Ceremonies (opening/closing), Athletics	50,000	
Broadmeadows	1956 Melbourne	Cycling (road)	Not listed.	
Bruce Stadium	2000 Sydney	Football	40,000	
Brussels–Scheldt Maritime Canal	1920 Antwerp	Rowing	Not listed.	
BSV 92 Field & Stadium	1936 Berlin	Cycling (track), handball	1,000	
Buiten Y	1920 Antwerp	Sailing (12 foot dinghy)	Not listed.	
Buiten Y	1928 Amsterdam	Sailing	2,263	
Bundesautobahn 96	1972 Munich	Cycling (road team time trial)	Not listed.	
Busan Yachting Center	1988 Seoul	Sailing	80	
Buson Stadium	1988 Seoul	Football	30,000	
