= Carioca Arena 1 =

Olympic arena in Rio de Janeiro

- Arena Carioca 1
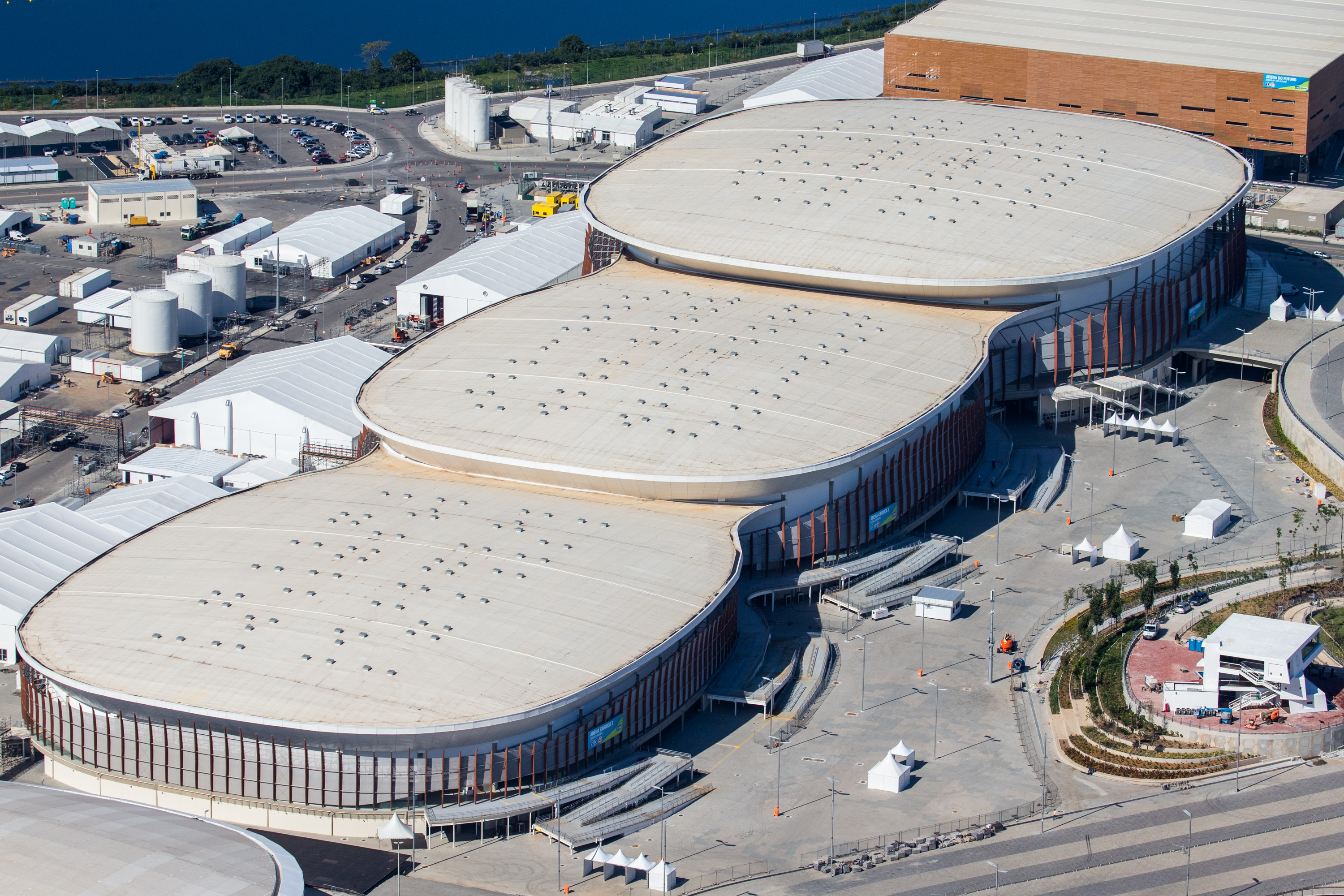
- Aerial view of the Carioca complex at Barra Olympic Park in May 2016; Arena 1 is the largest visible at top

- Location within Rio de Janeiro
- Location: Barra Olympic Park; Barra da Tijuca, Rio de Janeiro, Brazil
- Coordinates: 22.976511°S 43.392334°W
- Owner: City of Rio de Janeiro
- Capacity: Basketball: 16,000 (2016 Summer Olympics); 6,000 (after 2016 Summer Olympics)

Construction
- Groundbreaking: July 2013
- Opened: 2016

Carioca Arena 1 (Portuguese: Arena Carioca 1) is an indoor arena in Barra da Tijuca in the west zone of Rio de Janeiro, Brazil. The venue hosted basketball at the 2016 Summer Olympics as well as wheelchair basketball and wheelchair rugby at the 2016 Summer Paralympics. As with a number of other venues in the Barra Olympic Park, Carioca Arena 1 was transformed after the games to become part of the Olympic Training Centre.

== Construction ==
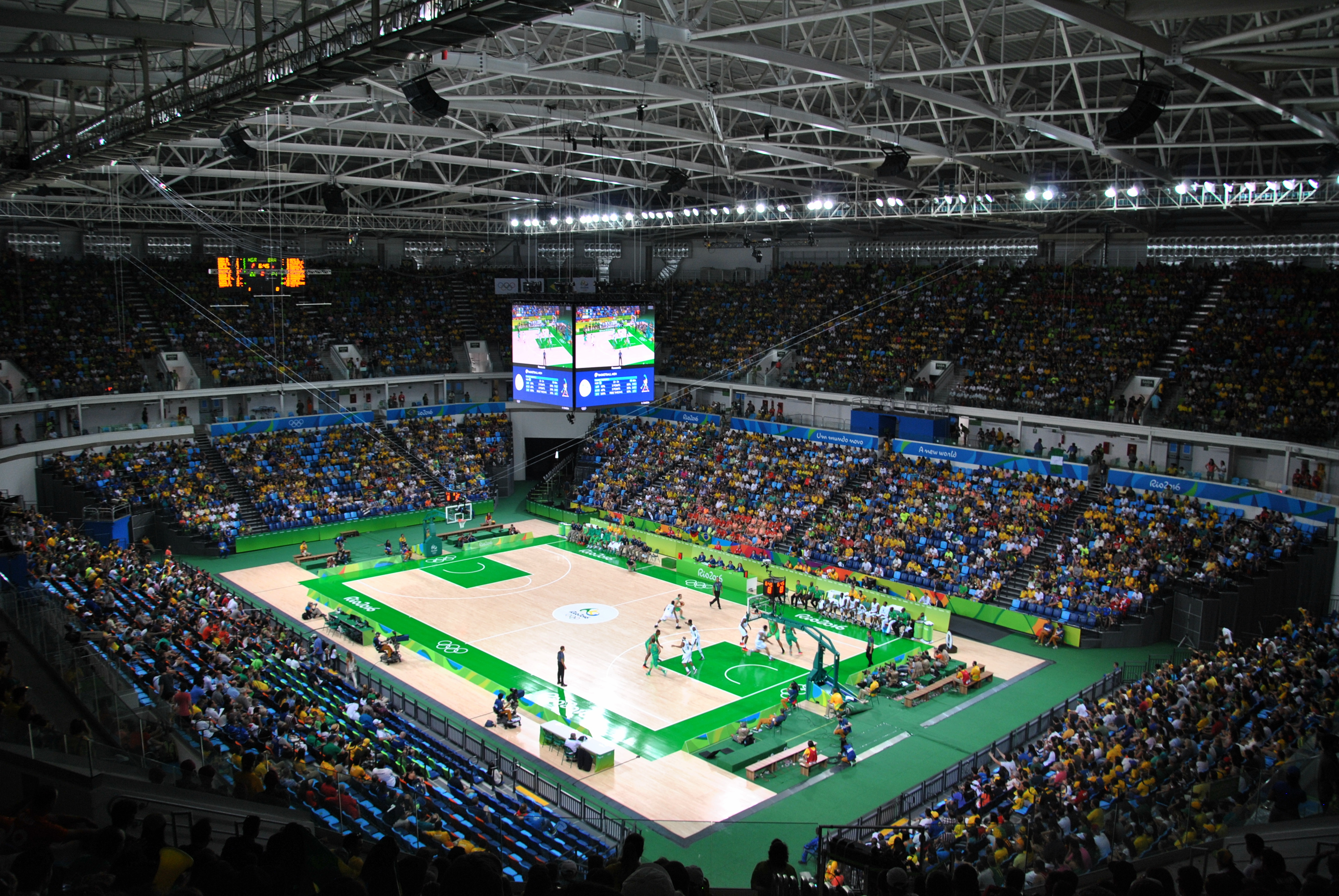
The interior of Carioca Arena 1

Construction on the arena began in July 2013. The arena covers 38 thousand square meters. The arena's capacity for the 2016 Summer Olympics was 16,000 spectators. However, it was lowered to 6,000 after the Olympics. The facade has a height of 33 meters, and its shape is inspired by the mountainous landscape of the city. The track was built with two types of wood, one for a different track and to the surrounding area, as well as a system for absorbing blows of the sport. The arena has 282 rooms, 49 bathrooms, eight dressing rooms and six lifts.

The estimated cost for the planned complex of three arenas (Carioca 1, Carioca 2 and Carioca 3), the IBC, MPC, a hotel, and the structure of the Olympic Park was 1.678 billion Brazilian reais, including part of the public initiative and private money. This was handled between the Prefecture of Rio de Janeiro and the private sector.

The work was completed in January 2016. As a part of the arena's opening events, there was the Basketball Tournament International Women Aquece River, held from 15 to 17, January 2016, and the International Championship of Wheelchair Rugby Rio Aquece, held from 29 to 31 January, 2016.

== Major sporting events hosted ==
Date	Competition	Home team	H	A	Away team	Ref.
27 November 2017	2019 FIBA World Cup Qualifier	Brazil	72	60	Venezuela	
17 February 2019	2019 FIBA Intercontinental Cup Final	(Greece) AEK	86	70	(Brazil) Flamengo	
June 26 – July 17, 2022	2022 Pan American Gymnastics Championships					
August 20 – August 24, 2025	2025 Rhythmic Gymnastics World Championships					
June 05 – June 07, 2026	2026 Pan American Rhythmic Gymnastics Championships					

== See also ==
- Carioca Arena 2
- Carioca Arena 3
- List of indoor arenas in Brazil

Events and tenants
Preceded by Pabellón Insular Santiago Martín; San Cristóbal de La Laguna	FIBA Intercontinental Cup; Final Venue; 2019	Succeeded by Pabellón Insular Santiago Martín; San Cristóbal de La Laguna
