= Carioca Arena 2 =

Stadium in Rio de Janeiro, Brazil

- Arena Carioca 2
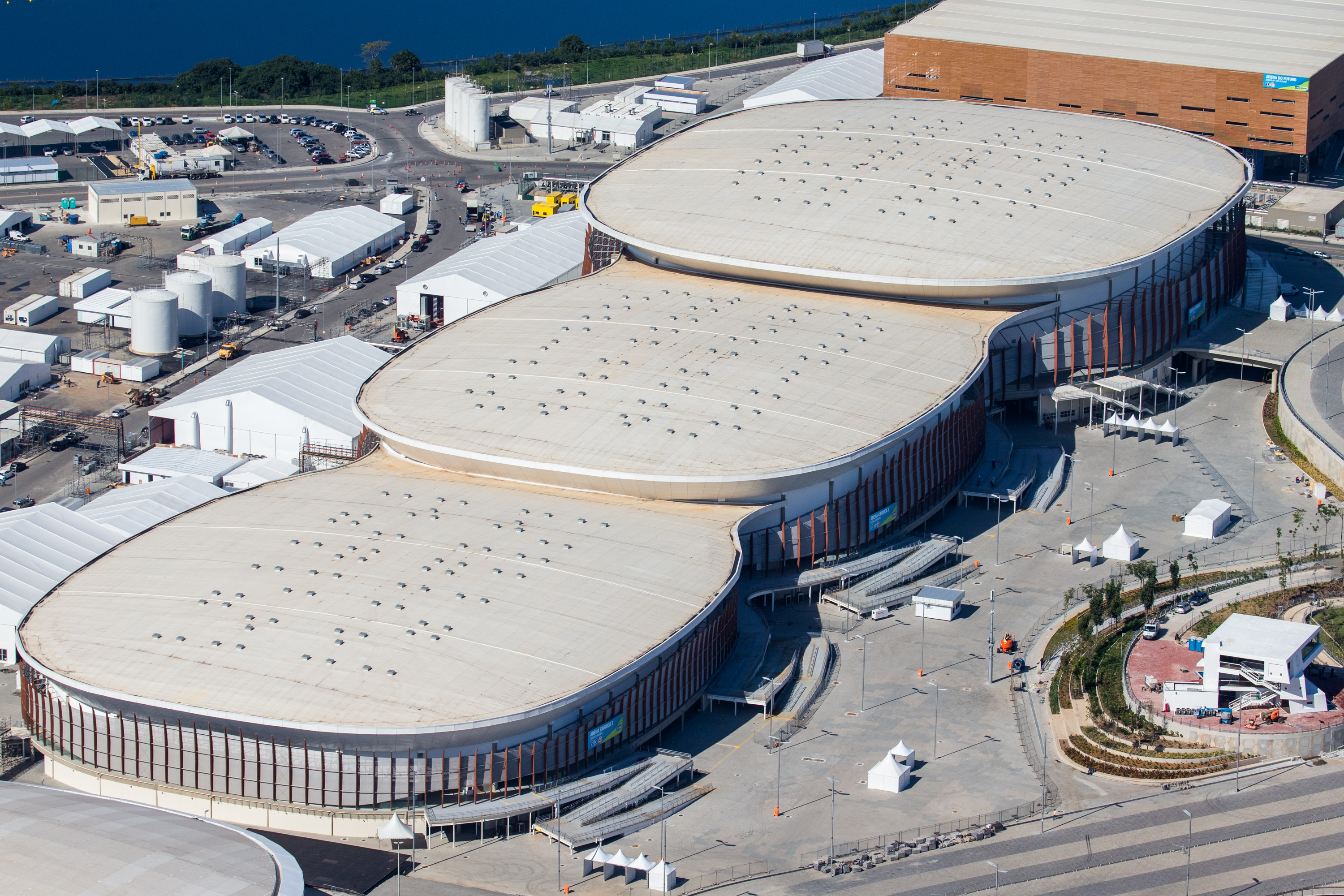
- Aerial view of the Carioca complex at Barra Olympic Park in May 2016; Arena 2 is visible at center
- Interactive map of Carioca Arena 2
- Location: Barra Olympic Park; Barra da Tijuca, Rio de Janeiro, Brazil
- Coordinates: 22.9777°S 43.3924°W
- Owner: City of Rio de Janeiro
- Capacity: 10,000 (Olympics)

Construction
- Opened: 2016

Carioca Arena 2 (Portuguese: Arena Carioca 2) is a technical education institution and indoor stadium in Barra da Tijuca in the west zone of Rio de Janeiro, Brazil. The venue hosted judo and wrestling at the 2016 Summer Olympics as well as boccia at the 2016 Summer Paralympics. As with a number of other venues in the Barra Olympic Park, Carioca Arena 2 was transformed after the games to become part of the Olympic Training Centre.

The arena has since been converted into a branch of the Federal Institute of Education, Science and Technology. It serves 1400 students.

== See also ==
- Carioca Arena 1
- Carioca Arena 3
- List of indoor arenas in Brazil
