= Barra Olympic Park =

Sports complex for the 2016 Summer Olympic Games

- Parque Olímpico da Barra
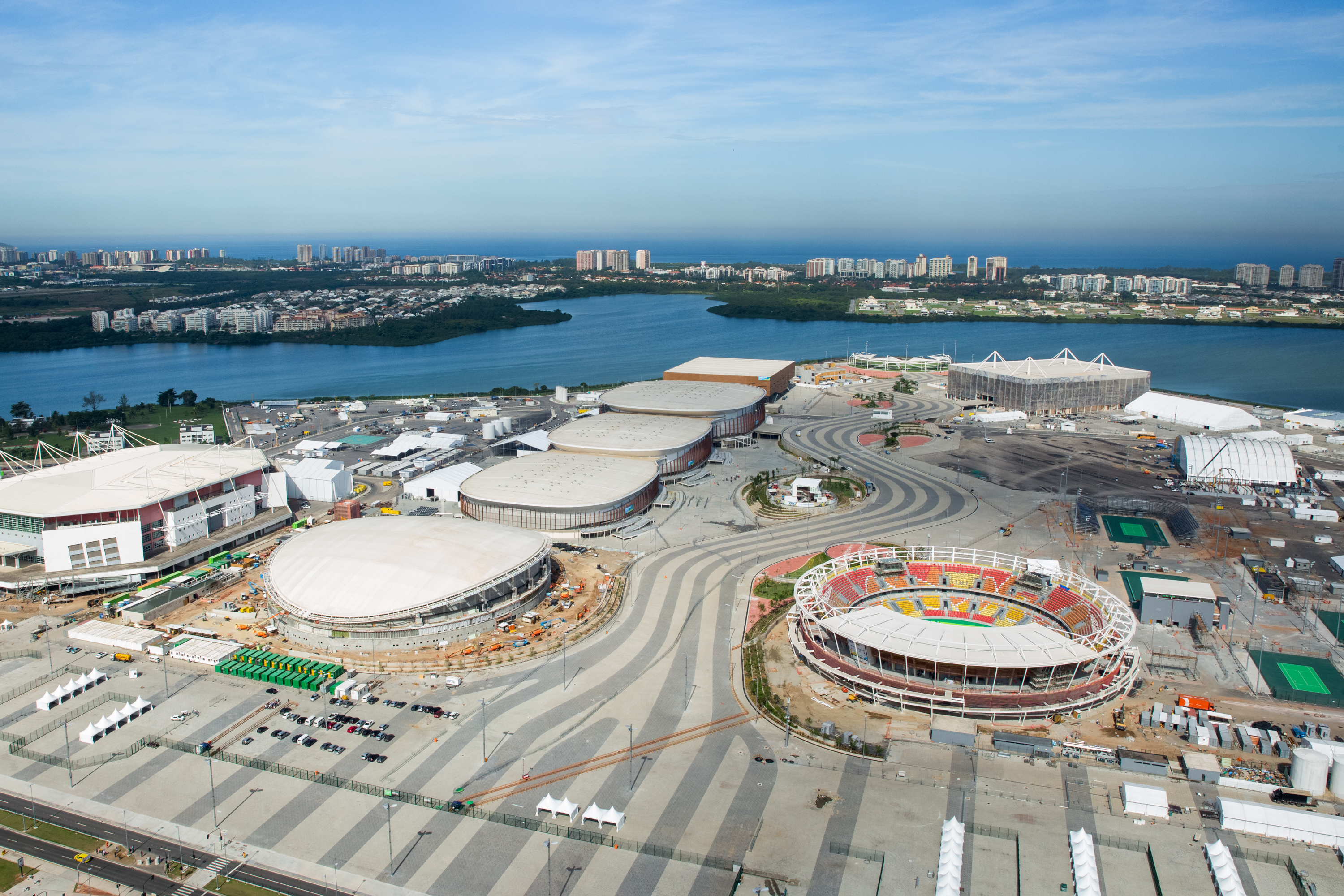
- Interactive map of Barra Olympic Park
- Location: Rio de Janeiro, Brazil
- Coordinates: 22.977°S 43.394°W
- Owner: Prefecture of Rio de Janeiro
- Facilities: Carioca Arena 1; Carioca Arena 2; Carioca Arena 3; Jeunesse Arena; Olympic Tennis Centre; Maria Lenk Aquatics Centre; Rio Olympic Velodrome

Construction
- Groundbreaking: 6 July 2012
- Opened: 6 August 2016
- Cost: R$ 2.34 billion
- Builders: Odebrecht, Andrade Gutierrez, Carvalho Hosken

The Barra Olympic Park (Brazilian Portuguese: Parque Olímpico da Barra), originally the City of Sports Complex, is a cluster of nine sporting venues in Barra da Tijuca, in the west zone of Rio de Janeiro, Brazil. The park, which served as the Olympic Park for the 2016 Summer Olympics and the 2016 Summer Paralympics, was originally built for the 2007 Pan American Games, consisting of three venues. The complex was later expanded to nine venues for the Olympics, two of which are temporary structures, and became the site of the Olympic Training Center.

== History ==
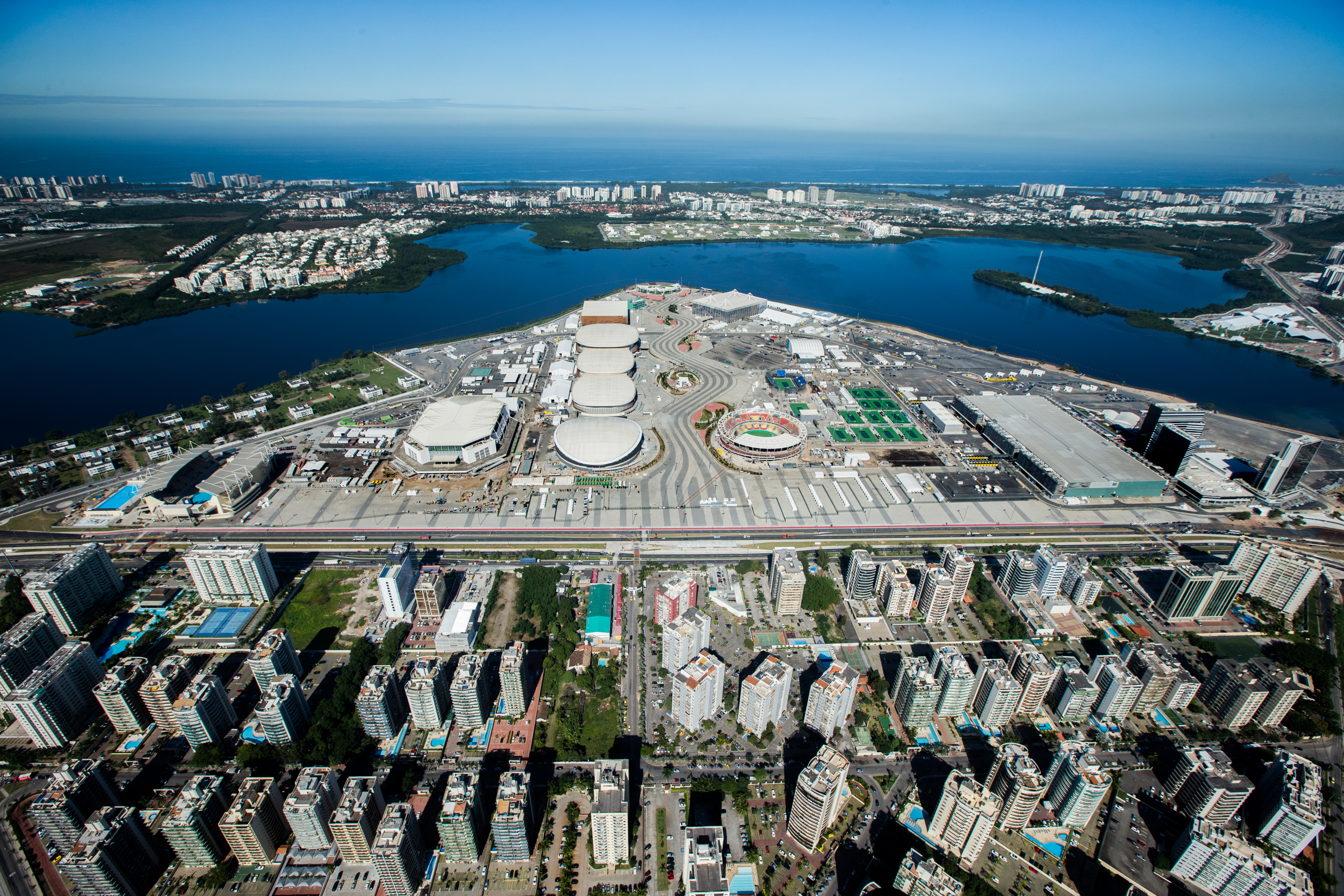
Aerial view of Barra Olympic Park in May 2016, looking southward.

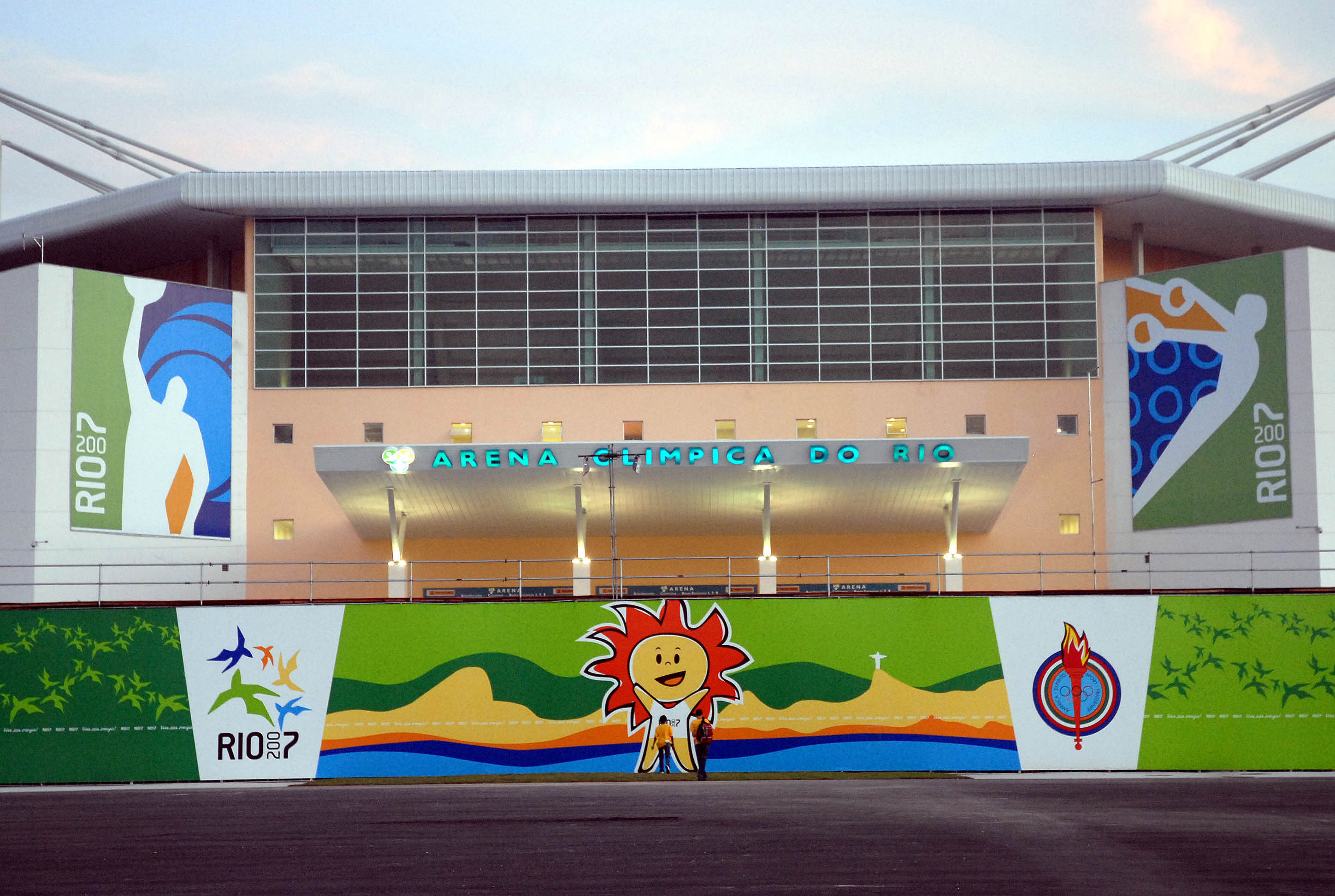
Exterior view of the Rio Olympic Arena during the 2007 Pan American Games.

The site of the Barra Olympic Park was formerly occupied by the Autódromo Internacional Nelson Piquet, also known as Jacarepaguá. It was a former Formula One circuit that hosted the Brazilian Grand Prix on a number of occasions throughout the 1980s, before the Grand Prix went back to its original home at the Autódromo José Carlos Pace, Interlagos, in 1990. Jacarepaguá was partly demolished to make way for the City of Sports Complex, a cluster of three venues constructed for the 2007 Pan American Games, held in Rio de Janeiro. The venues consisted the Maria Lenk Aquatic Center, which held diving, swimming and synchronized swimming events, the Rio Olympic Arena, which held basketball and artistic gymnastics events, and the Barra Velodrome, which held track cycling and speed roller skating events. Construction of the City of Sports was not without setbacks – the original plan for the complex called for a large-scale entertainment complex, valued at R$ 500 million and contracted to private firms for construction. These plans, however, fell through, and a smaller-scale plan for the complex was adopted instead. Opposition efforts by preservationists of the Jacarepaguá, the unsuitable soil at the construction site and numerous strike actions by workers delayed the venue's construction, which initially planned to begin in 2005, but was delayed until mid-2006. Despite these challenges, the venues were completed in time for the games in July 2007, and cost a relatively cheaper R$ 205 million to construct, with venues smaller than originally planned.

In 2009, Rio de Janeiro successfully bid to host the 2016 Summer Olympics and Paralympics. Plans for a new array of venues at the City of Sports, rebranded the Barra Olympic Park, along with the complete demolition of the Jacarepaguá, was in the works. The Barra Velodrome, however, was not approved by the International Cycling Union as an appropriate venue for track cycling events at the Olympics. It was decided that costs to upgrade the velodrome would be equally as expensive as building a new venue, thus the Rio Olympic Velodrome, built immediately west of the Rio Olympic Arena, was conceived, with the Barra Velodrome being demolished in 2013. Other new venues constructed for the Olympics include the Carioca Arenas, the Olympic Tennis Center, and the temporary Olympic Aquatics Stadium, built on the site of the former Barra Velodrome, and Future Arena venues.

Domestic broadcaster Rede Globo constructed a studio for its coverage of the Games in Barra Olympic Park.

== Venues ==
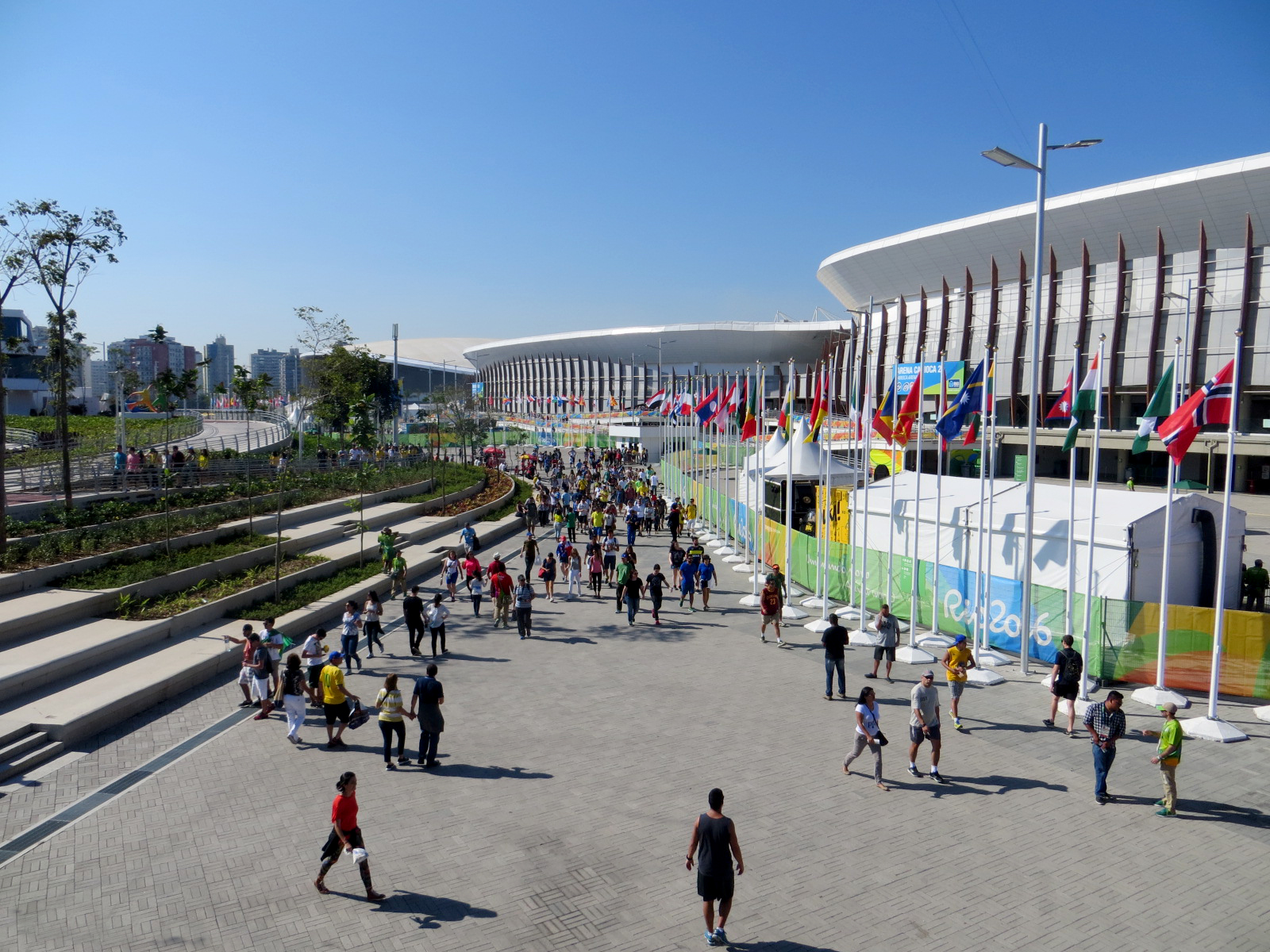
Ground-level view of the surrounding environment outside the Carioca Arenas.

Current

- Carioca Arena 1: basketball, wheelchair basketball, and wheelchair rugby (capacity: 16,000)
- Carioca Arena 2: wrestling, judo, and boccia (capacity: 10,000)
- Carioca Arena 3: fencing, taekwondo, paralympic judo, and paralympic fencing (capacity: 10,000)
- Maria Lenk Aquatics Centre: diving, synchronised swimming, water polo (capacity: 5,000)
- Olympic Tennis Centre: tennis, wheelchair tennis and 5-a-side football (capacity: 10,000; Main Court)
- Farmasi Arena: gymnastics and wheelchair basketball (capacity: 12,000)
- Rio Olympic Velodrome: track cycling (capacity: 5,000)

Former

- Barra Velodrome (capacity 5,000)
- Future Arena: handball and goalball (capacity: 12,000)
- Olympic Aquatics Stadium: swimming, synchronised swimming, water polo play-offs and paralympic swimming (capacity: 15,000)
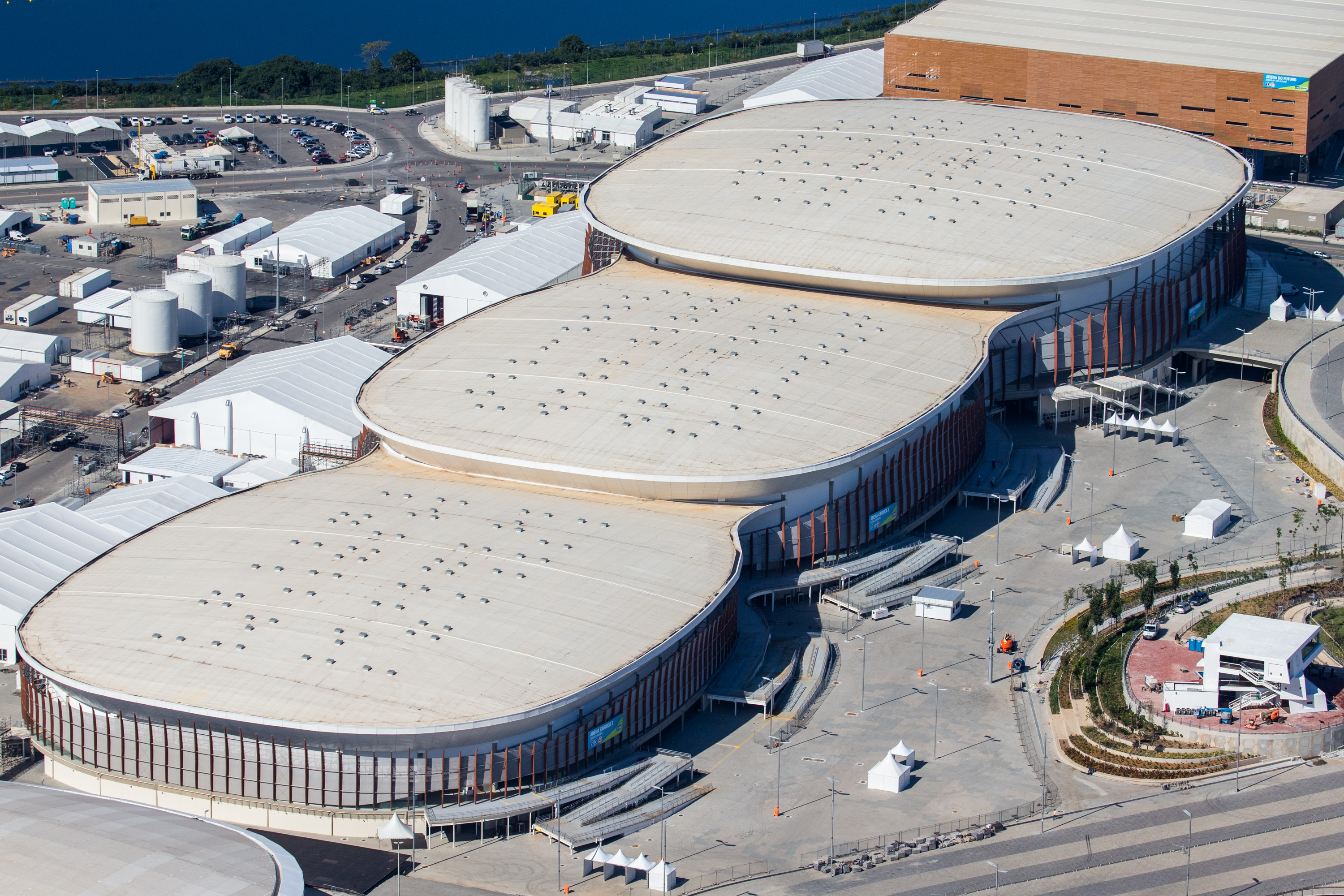
The three Carioca Arenas (3, 2 and 1 on top)

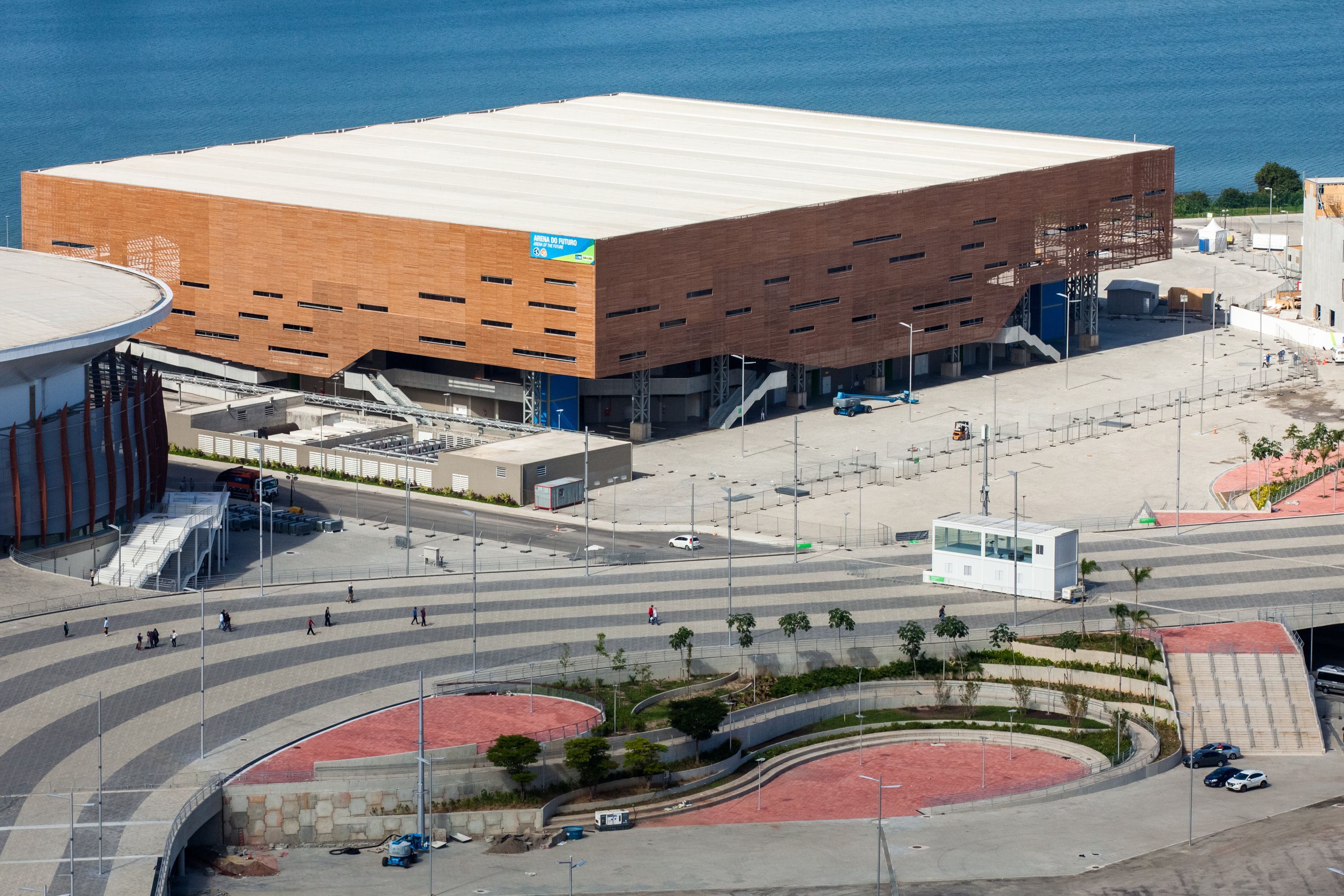
Future Arena

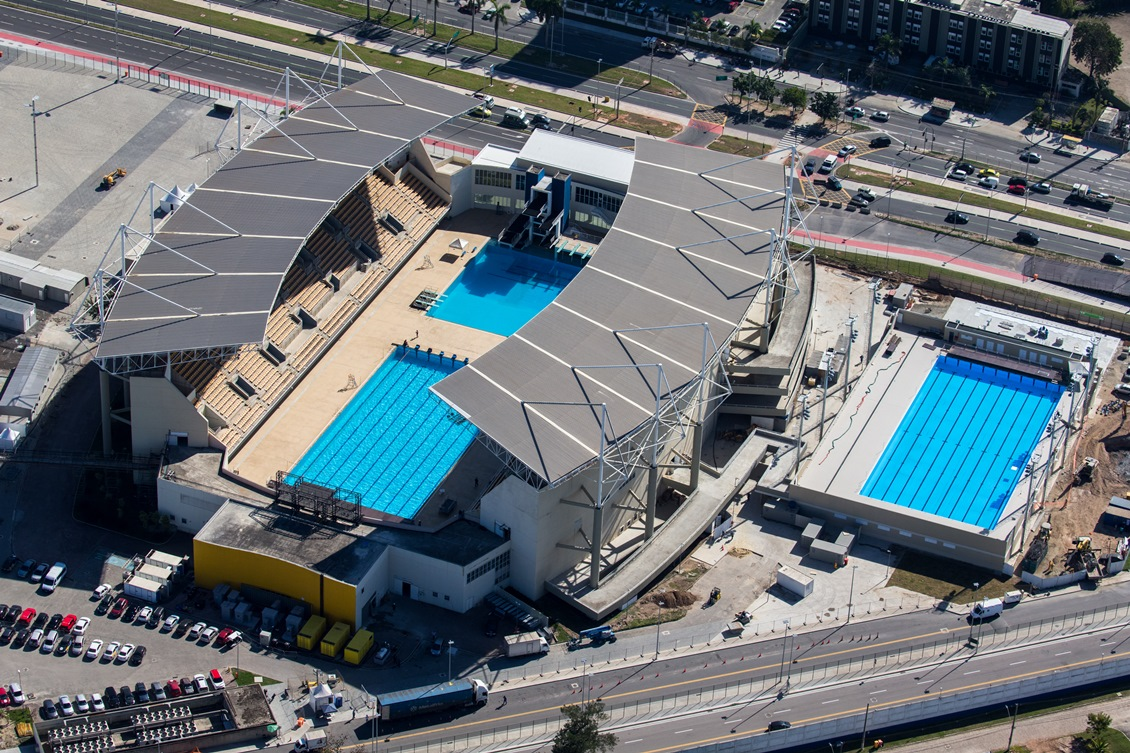
Maria Lenk Center

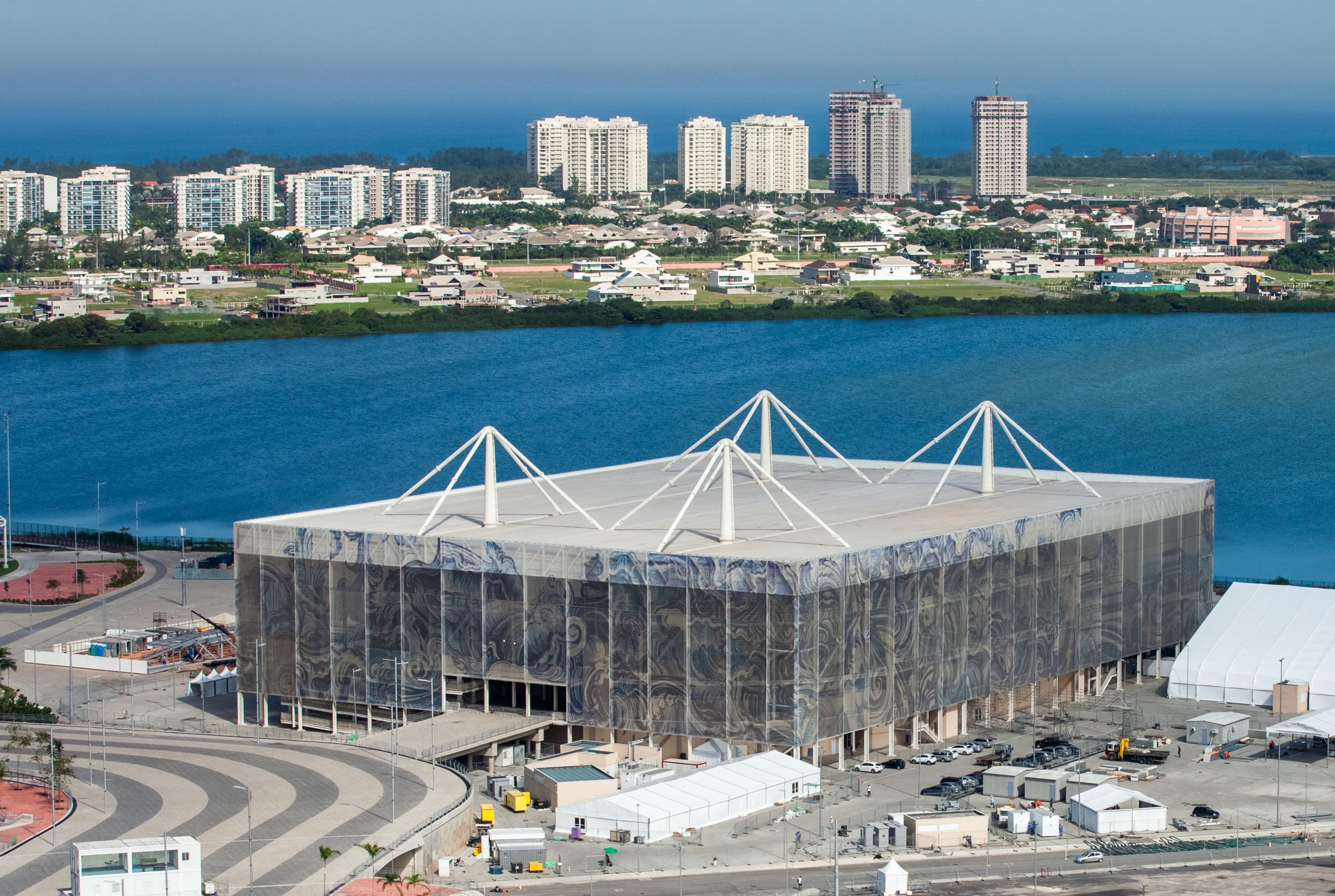
Aquatics Stadium

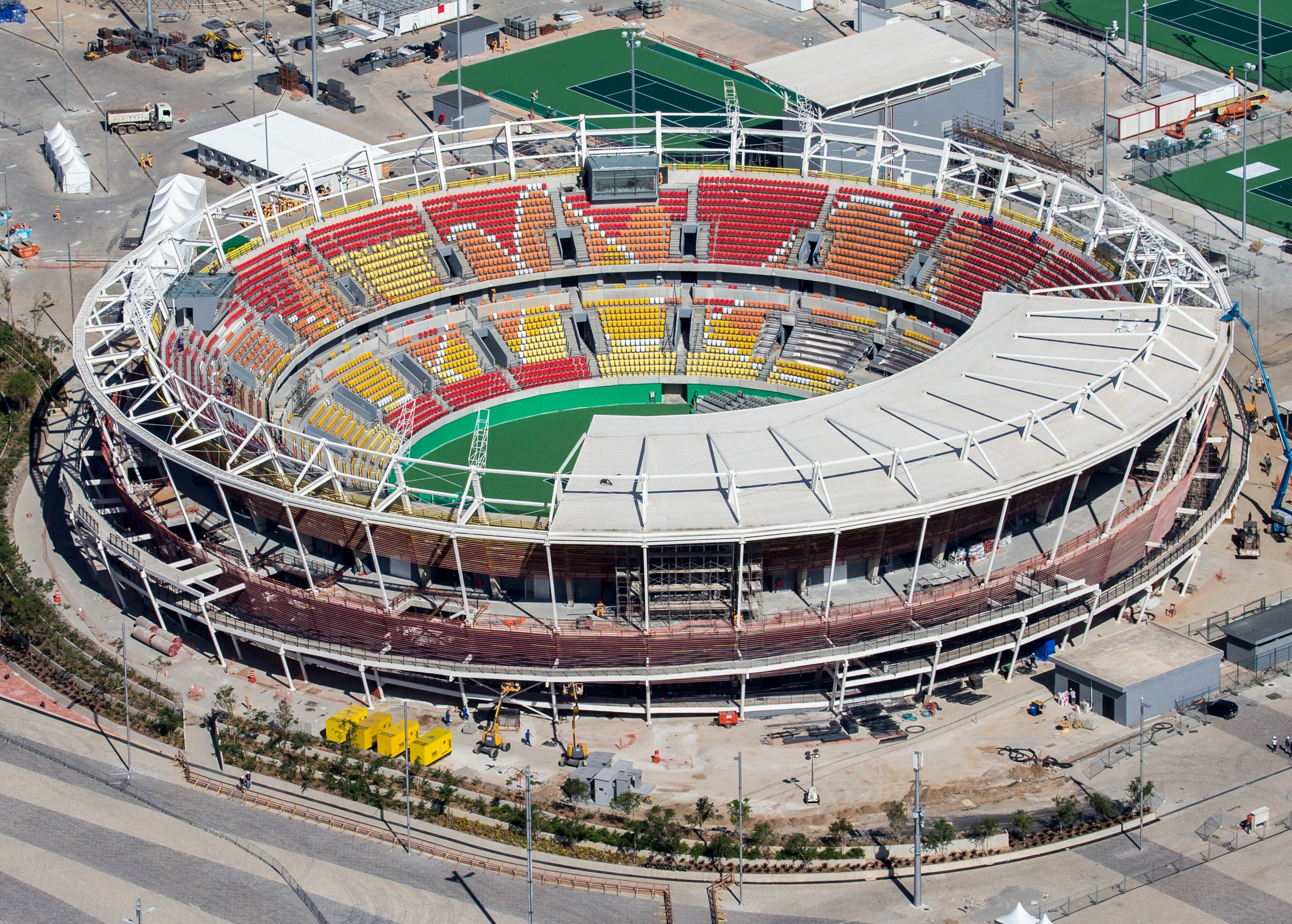
Olympic Tennis Center

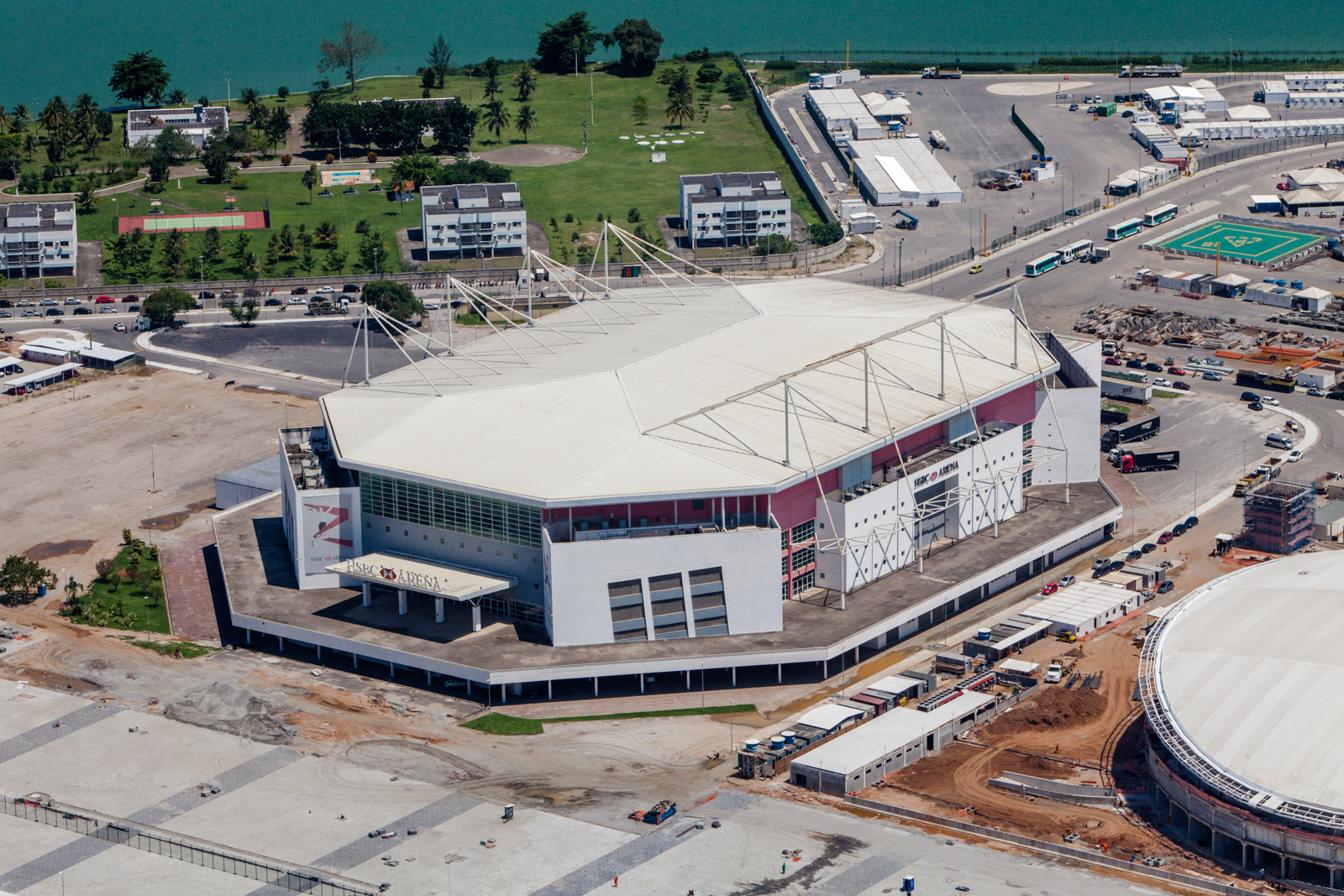
Rio Olympic Arena

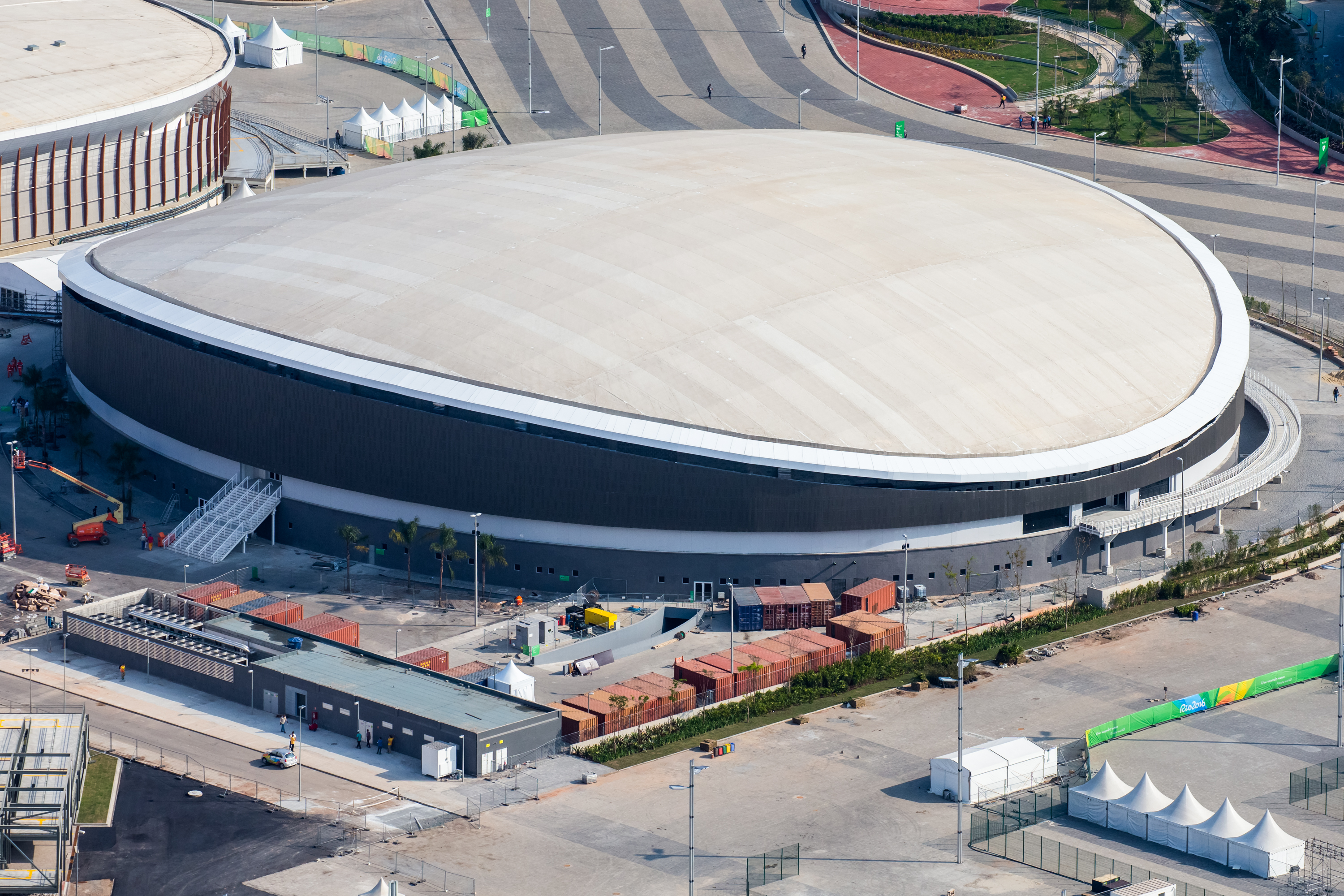
Rio Velodrome

== Legacy ==
After the conclusion of the games, the site was repurposed to become the Olympic Training Center, a sports training facility operated by the Brazilian Ministry of Sports. The Olympic Aquatics Stadium was dismantled and its parts were used in the construction of two new swimming venues on the site - both 50m pools with capacities for 6,000 and 3,000 spectators, respectively, with other pools being donated to various projects around Brazil. Carioca Arena 2 became a campus of the Federal Institute of Education, Science and Technology, serving 1400 students, while Carioca Arena 3 became a sports training school, with space for 5000 full-time students. In addition, Future Arena was dismantled for its materials to be used in the construction of public schools across Rio de Janeiro city, and the Rio Olympic Velodrome now houses the Rio Olympic Museum.

In 2017, it was announced that the Olympic Park will be the permanent site of the Rock in Rio traditional international music festival.

During the games, the Olympic Way was used to connect pedestrians to major venues in Barra Olympic Park. In 2024, the walkthrough was revitalized as the Rita Lee Park.

== See also ==
- Olympic Green
- Queen Elizabeth Olympic Park
- Athens Olympic Sports Complex
- Seoul Olympic Park
- Sydney Olympic Park
- Centennial Olympic Park
