= Expotrade Arena =

Indoor arena in Curitiba, Brazil

- Location in Brazil
- Full name: Expotrade Convention and Exhibition Center
- Location: Pinhais, Curitiba, Brazil
- Coordinates: 25.433945°S 49.167359°W
- Capacity: 10,000-20,000
- Type: Indoor arena; Convention center; Music venue; Exhibition hall

Website
- www.expotrade.com.br

The Expotrade Arena or Expotrade Convention and Exhibition Center is an indoor arena and convention center located in Pinhais, metropolitan area of Curitiba, Brazil, with a capacity of up to 20,000 for concerts and 10,000 for exhibitions.

== List of concerts ==
The arena was set to substitute the venue concert Pedreira Paulo Leminski that was closed in late 2008 until 2014, when Pedreira was re-opened.

- Oasis: May 10, 2009 - Dig Out Your Soul Tour
- Scorpions: September 21, 2010 - Get Your Sting and Blackout World Tour
- Iron Maiden: April 5, 2011 - The Final Frontier World Tour
- Maroon 5: August 24, 2012 - Overexposed Tour

== See also ==
- List of indoor arenas in Brazil
