= Rio Olympic Velodrome =

Velodrome in Rio de Janeiro, Brazil

Velódromo Municipal do Rio
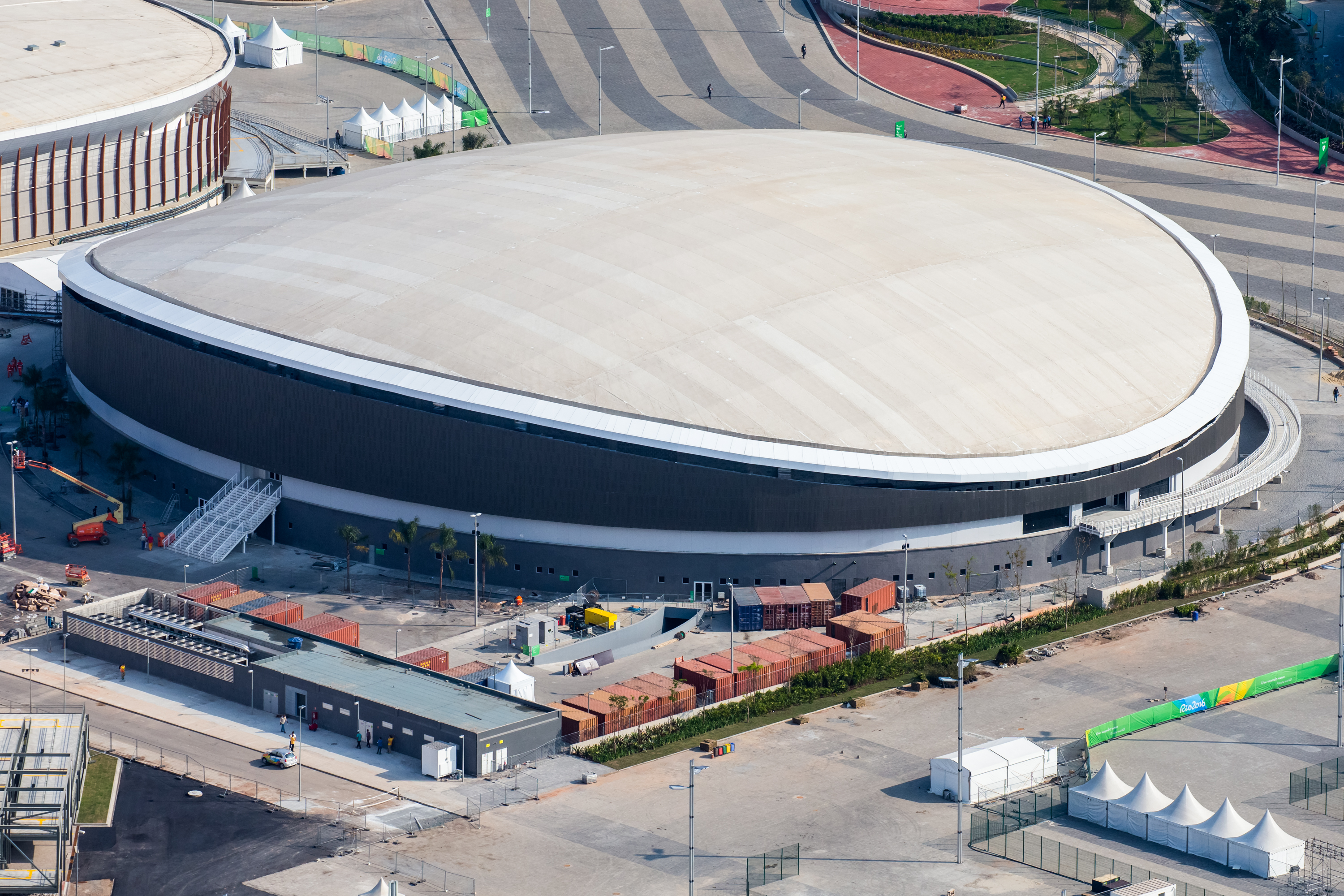
- Aerial view of the Rio Olympic Velodrome
- Interactive map of Velódromo Municipal do Rio
- Location: Barra da Tijuca, Rio de Janeiro, Brazil
- Coordinates: 22°58′28.93″S 43°23′32.04″W
- Capacity: 5,000

Construction
- Opened: 25 July 2016
- Cost: R$ 143.6 million (US$ 44.82 million)
- Architect: Schuermann
- Main contractors: Tecnosolo S.A (former); Engetécnica (current)

The Rio Olympic Velodrome, officially the Velódromo Municipal do Rio (Rio Municipal Velodrome), is a velodrome located in the Barra Olympic Park sports complex in Rio de Janeiro, Brazil. Built as a replacement for the former Barra Velodrome, the venue hosted track cycling events during the 2016 Summer Olympics and 2016 Summer Paralympics. Following the conclusion of the games, the velodrome is now a part of the Olympic Training Center and now houses the Rio Olympic Museum.

== Design ==
The Rio Olympic Velodrome was designed by Schuermann Architects, a German design group led by Ralph Schuermann. The group had previously designed the Laoshan Velodrome for the 2008 Summer Olympics in Beijing, along with six other Olympic cycling venues and twenty World Championship venues. The wooden track is made from timber sourced from the Siberian pine, considered to be the fastest surface for track cycling.

== History ==
=== Demolition of Barra Velodrome ===
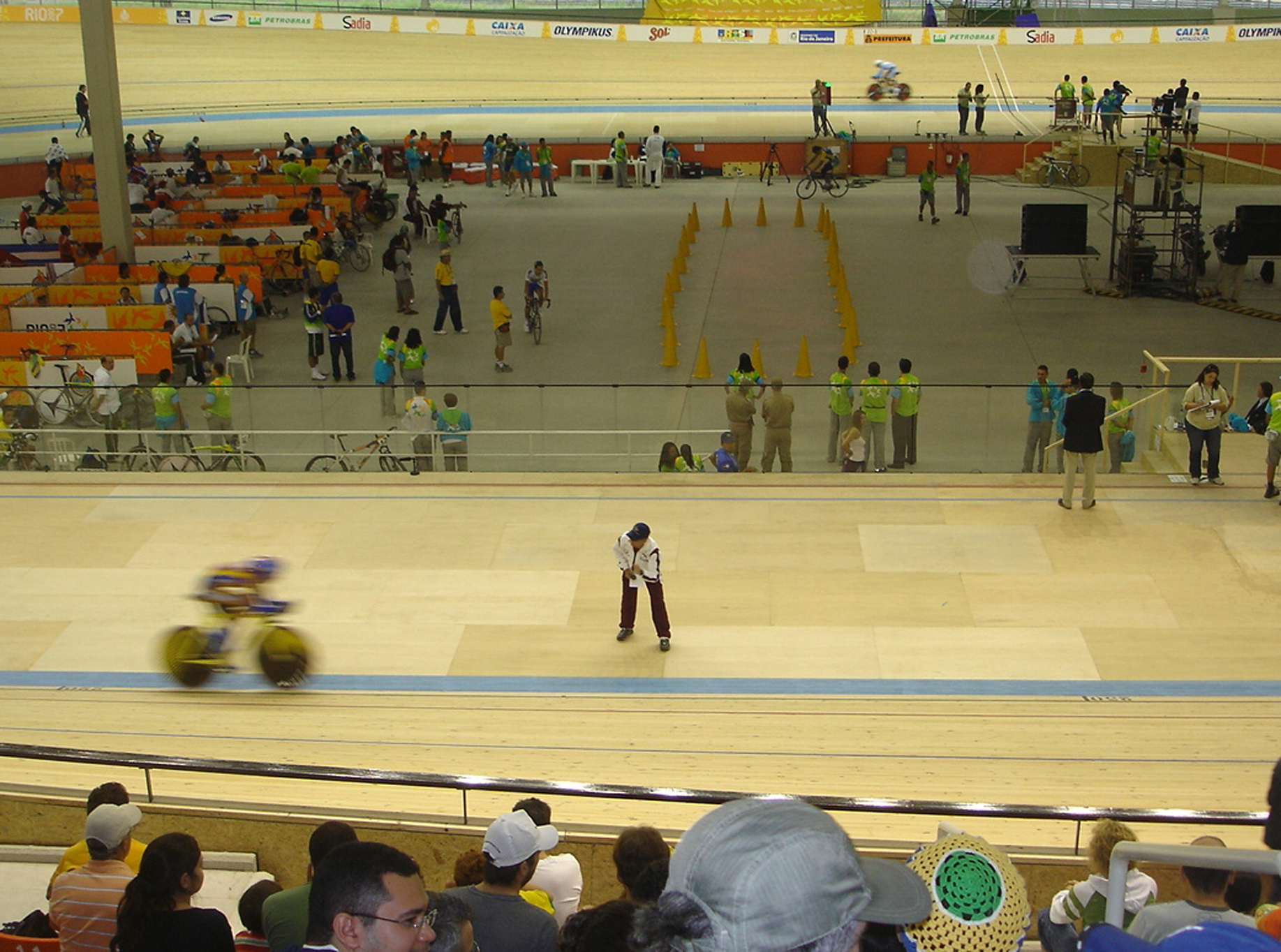
Interior view of the Barra Velodrome, a predecessor venue that was planned to hold Olympic cycling events, but was deemed unsuitable by the International Cycling Union.

The Barra Velodrome, one of three venues built as part of the City of Sports Complex in Barra da Tijuca for the 2007 Pan American Games, was originally planned to host cycling events for the 2016 Summer Olympics and Paralympics. In early 2013, the International Cycling Union (UCI), the governing body of sports cycling, deemed the velodrome as unsuitable for hosting Olympic events, citing pillars obscuring the view of spectators and judges, and cyclists' inability to reach significant speeds on the track. The cost of upgrading the venue to UCI standards was projected to be as great as building a completely new venue, and thus it was decided that the Barra Velodrome was to be demolished in favour of building a new one at a different site in the park. After the Barra Velodrome was demolished, work on the Rio Olympic Velodrome began, with British firm 3D Reid, who designed the Commonwealth Arena and Sir Chris Hoy Velodrome for the 2014 Commonwealth Games, was chosen alongside Rio de Janeiro-based firm BLAC Architects to help advise design development of the Velodrome. Tenders to construct and operate the venue were opened in October 2013 and won by Brazilian engineering firm Tecnosolo S.A, at a budget of R$136.9 million. The cost did not include the budget for track installation, which was to be the responsibility of the Olympic Organizing Committee. The dismantled velodrome was to be given to Goiânia before the city reconsidered due to the high maintenance costs, and the structure were eventually sent to the city of Pinhais, where they wound up unused for years. Only in 2019 the project for a sports complex centered around the velodrome started, with construction advancing by 2021.

=== Construction, setbacks and progress ===
Construction of the velodrome was marred by many issues and controversies, which included numerous delays, poor working conditions and financial difficulties. As with every track cycling venue purpose-built for the Olympics since the 1960 games, the Rio Olympic Velodrome faced cost overruns by its final year of construction. Olympic Games Executive Director Gilbert Felli warned as early as November 2014 that the velodrome had become a concern for the International Olympic Committee (IOC) – the venue was originally planned to be complete by the end of 2015, but delays had organizers worried that it would not open until early 2016 instead, despite the UCI pressing that this would not be the case. Mayor of Rio de Janeiro Eduardo Paes admitted in December 2014 that work on the velodrome was three weeks behind schedule, and evaluations by the IOC in February 2015 found that substantial work still remained in order for the venue to be complete by scheduled test events prior to the Olympics, describing "very aggressive timelines that will need to be met over the coming months." Despite these troubles, Mário Andrada, a spokesperson for the Rio Organizing Committee, stated, "the delays they cited concern the test events and not to the Games... the velodrome, even though a little late, will not impact the test event. We are counting on it."

"There is no plan B. There is not another usable velodrome in Brazil as far as I know and there has to be a velodrome. The building is virtually there, timings are the issue. But that’s not just true for the velodrome, it’s the same for other venues. They’ve had well-publicised problems, but I want to be supportive and the UCI will help as much as we can."

— President of the International Cycling Union Brian Cookson

In April 2015, construction was temporarily suspended by Brazil's Ministry of Labor and Employment, claiming a "grave and imminent danger to the physical safety of workers." The ministry cited their concerns for "the absence of collective protection", and risk of workers falling, in addition to lack of security, no technical report on the stability of slopes at the site, and what was described as a potentially hazardous "accumulation of material". The temporary suspension added even more stress on the construction's timetable, with works being sped up significantly afterwards, with the Organising Committee stressing that "work was back on track." Unfortunately, delays proved to be a valid concern, when cycling test events originally scheduled to take place at the Velodrome on 18 – 20 March 2016 were rescheduled to 29 April – 1 May, due to a delay in the installation of the velodrome's track. Blame was put on poor conditions for the installation of the Siberian-sourced timber, which could potentially lead to the wood warping and bending. It was by then that President of the UCI Brian Cookson made public his concerns about the completion of the venue, bluntly stating to the media, in a press conference after the 2016 UCI Track Cycling World Championships, that completing the venue in time for test events in late April was "a challenge", and that "if the velodrome is not ready in time, there is no plan B."

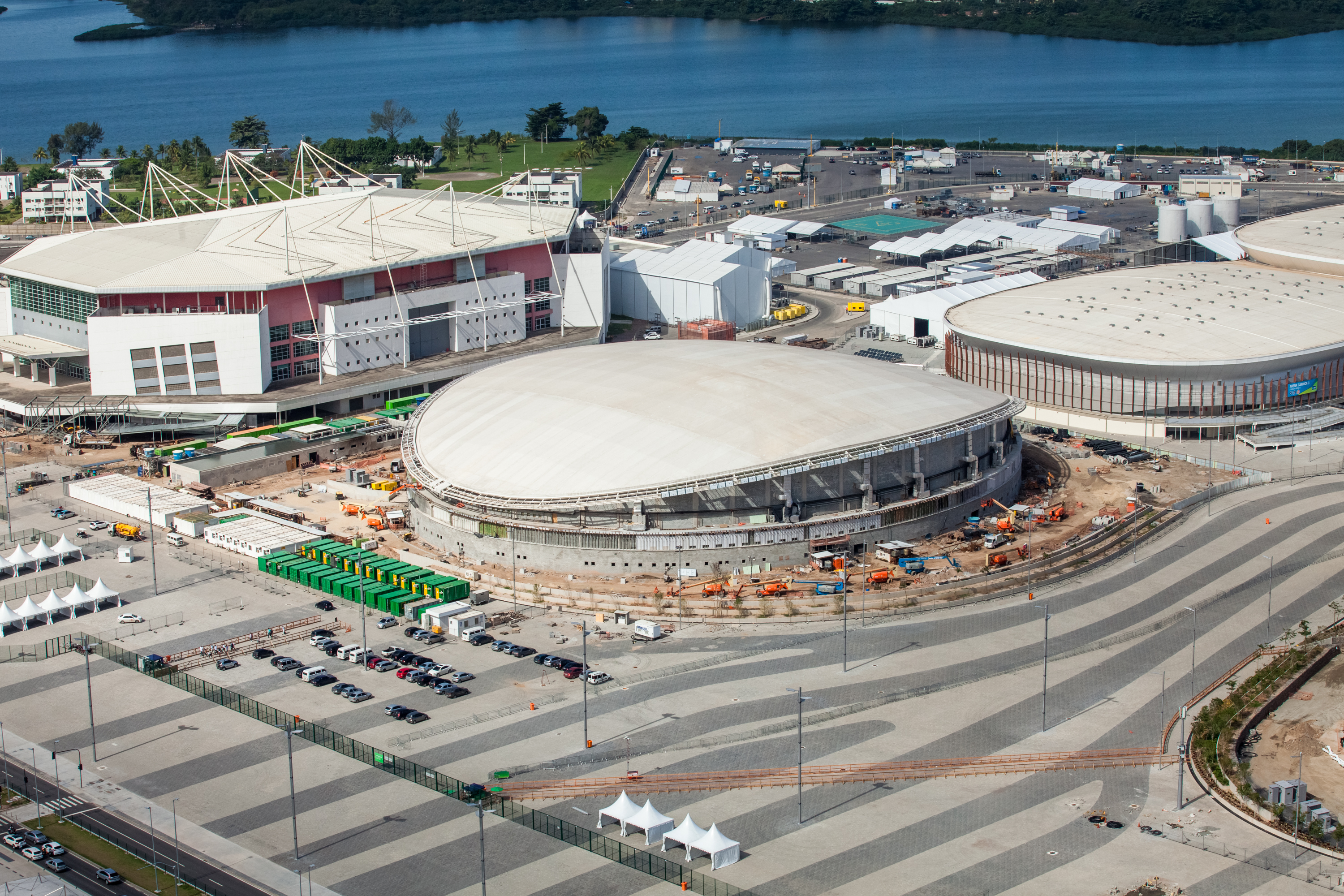
Exterior view of the velodrome and surrounding venues, during the final stages of construction in May 2016.

By late March 2016, however, the track was still not installed, and the planned test event that was delayed to late April was completely cancelled, leaving the venue untested through competition until the Olympics themselves in August. The Organising Committee cited "logistical problems" with the import of raw materials from Serbia; the wood arrived late into Rio's summer, and the city's high humidity meant that the sensitive surface could not be laid as quickly as expected. Comments by Mayor Paes that the velodrome was only 85 percent complete, contradicting earlier comments that opportunities for Olympic cyclists to train at the venue would be held on 25 – 27 June. Troubles further escalated when Tecnosolo, the venue's construction and operation contractor, filed for bankruptcy in late May. The municipal government of Rio de Janeiro cancelled the contract with Tecnosolo shortly afterwards, saying in a statement that the company "did not have the conditions to continue being technically responsible for the construction of the velodrome". Brazilian real estate firm Engetécnica, who were previously hired as a subcontractor for the venue in February, were hired to replace Tecnosolo and finish construction of the velodrome. By the end of May, the track had finally been installed, with the venue estimated to be 88 percent complete, and training days in the venue for cyclists still penned for late June.

On 26 June 2016, a month before the start of the 2016 Summer Olympics, the Rio Olympic Organizing Committee finally took possession of the velodrome, marking the end of construction. The very first training events held at the venue took place the previous day. The venue's opening was not without controversy, however, when state prosecutors inquired about the selection of Engetécnica and subcontractor company Zadar for construction and operation contracts, without a proper bidding process. The municipal government of Rio de Janeiro stated that "the city could not stop the works to comply with time requirements", affirming that there was no time for a public bidding process under the velodrome's tight construction schedule, and that Zadar and Engetécnica were hired under emergency contracts. Additional works on the velodrome were completed on 10 July, and Olympic cyclists were allowed access on 24 July, two weeks prior to the start of the games.

=== Later history ===
After the Olympics, the velodrome spent time closed due to two roof fires in June and November 2017, and further damage caused by a storm in October 2018. By 2020, the high costs to hold cycling competitions at the velodrome led to underuse in its intended sport in the intervening years, with the biggest event being the 2018 UCI Para-cycling Track World Championships, and sporting events at the velodrome being mostly combat sports once the area inside the track was fitted with mats. Only in 2022 a proper competition was held with the Brazilian track championship.

The building's roof was damaged following another fire, in April 2026, although the track beneath was unharmed.

== Track records ==
=== Men ===
Event	Athlete(s)	Time	Event
Sprint	Jason Kenny (GBR)	9.551 (OR)	2016 Summer Olympics – Men's sprint qualification
Team pursuit	Ed Clancy (GBR); Steven Burke (GBR); Owain Doull (GBR); Bradley Wiggins (GBR)	3:50.265 (WR, OR)	2016 Summer Olympics – Men's team pursuit final
Team sprint	Philip Hindes (GBR); Jason Kenny (GBR); Callum Skinner (GBR)	42.440 (OR)	2016 Summer Olympics – Men's team sprint final

=== Women ===
Event	Athlete(s)	Time	Event
Sprint	Becky James (GBR)	10.721 (OR)	2016 Summer Olympics – Women's sprint qualification
Team pursuit	Katie Archibald (GBR); Laura Trott (GBR); Elinor Barker (GBR); Joanna Rowsell (GBR)	4:10.236 (WR, OR)	2016 Summer Olympics – Women's team pursuit final
Team sprint	Gong Jinjie (CHN); Zhong Tianshi (CHN)	31.928 (WR, OR)	2016 Summer Olympics – Women's team sprint first round

== See also ==
- List of cycling tracks and velodromes
- List of Olympic venues in cycling
- Venues of the 2016 Summer Olympics and Paralympics
