= Centro de Eventos do Ceará =

Indoor arena in Fortaleza, Brazil

- CEC
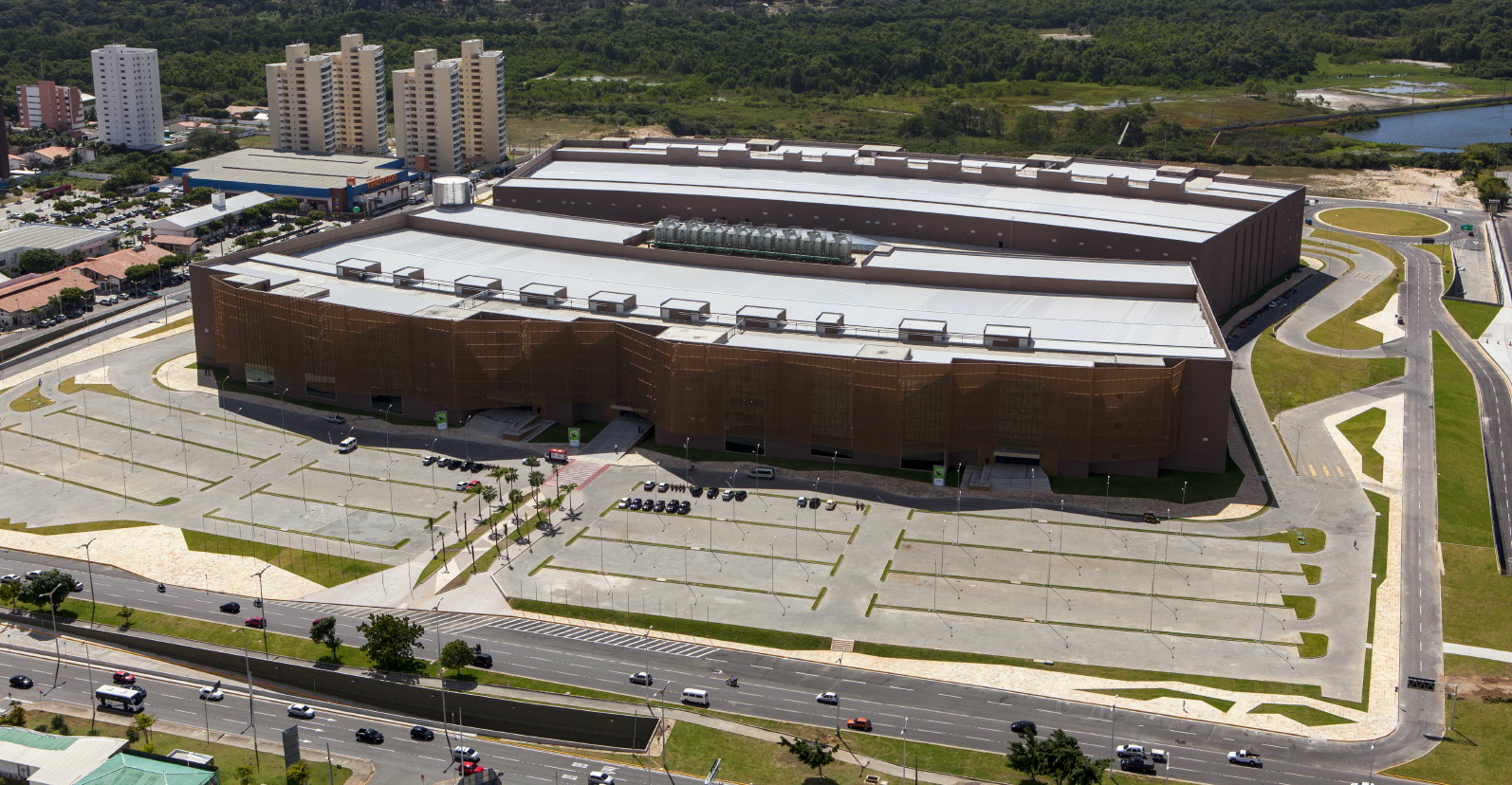
- Interactive map of Centro de Eventos do Ceará
- Former names: Pavilhão de Feiras e Eventos de Fortaleza
- Location: Av. Washington Soares, Fortaleza, Ceará, Brazil
- Owner: Government of the State of Ceará
- Capacity: 30,000

Construction
- Opened: June 30, 2012
- Cost: R$ 486.51 million

Centro de Eventos do Ceará (English: Ceará Event Center) is a multi-purpose indoor arena in Fortaleza, Brazil. It is the second largest convention center in Latin America in a total area of 76,000 m^{2}.

The arena had its first event on June 30, 2012, with a show by Jennifer Lopez and Ivete Sangalo as a part of Arte Music Festival. However, the arena was officially inaugurated on August 15, 2012, with a show by Spanish tenor Plácido Domingo and Orquestra de Câmara Eleazar de Carvalho.

== Structure ==
The arena is divided into two large blocks, composed by two exhibition halls and two mezzanines, with eighteen rooms each. The exhibition halls have an area of 13,500 m^{2}, with a capacity of 30,000 spectators and are divided into West Pavilion and East Pavilion.

== Events ==
The following is a list of notable events held at Centro de Eventos do Ceará.

- Centro de Eventos do Ceará Grand Opening (Plácido Domingo and Orquestra de Câmara Eleazar de Carvalho) – August 15, 2012
- Miss Brasil 2012 – September 29, 2012
- 6th BRICS summit – July 14–15, 2014
- Miss Brasil 2014 – July 19, 2014
- Super Amostra Nacional de Animes - Held two times a year, the event popularly known as "SANA", is focused on anime, manga, tokusatsu, videogame also card game like Yu-Gi-Oh!, geek culture, J-pop and K-pop concerts.
- Intersolar Summit Brazil Nordeste - April 10, 11, 2019

=== Concerts ===
Year	Date	Artist(s) (Opening act)	Tour	Attendance	Ref.
2012	June, 30	Ivete Sangalo, Jennifer Lopez	Arte Music Festival, Dance Again World Tour	+25,000	
2014	April 17	Guns N' Roses	Appetite for Democracy	+25,000	
2014	December 20	SOJA (Onze:20 and Planta & Raiz)	—N/a	—N/a	
2015	January 10	David Guetta	Listen Tour	+16,000	
2015	October 9	Los Hermanos	Turnê 2015	—N/a	
2016	January 23	Magic!	—N/a	—N/a	
2016	April 9	Roberto Carlos	—N/a	+7,000	
2016	June 11	Legião Urbana	Legião Urbana XXX anos	—N/a	
2017	September 2	Paulinho da Viola; Marisa Monte	Paulinho da Viola encontra Marisa Monte	—N/a	
2017	October 1	O Rappa	Último Show	—N/a	
2017	December 2	Pabllo Vittar; Banda Uó	Pisa Menos	—N/a	
2018	January 19	SOJA (Onze:20)	Poetry In Motion	—N/a	
2018	January 27	Rouge	15 Anos Tour	—N/a	
2018	March 24	O Rappa (BaianaSystem)	—N/a	—N/a	
2019	July, 19	Sandy & Junior	Nossa História	—N/a	

== See also ==
- List of indoor arenas in Brazil
