= Ginásio Teixeirinha =

Indoor sporting arena in Passo Fundo, Brazil

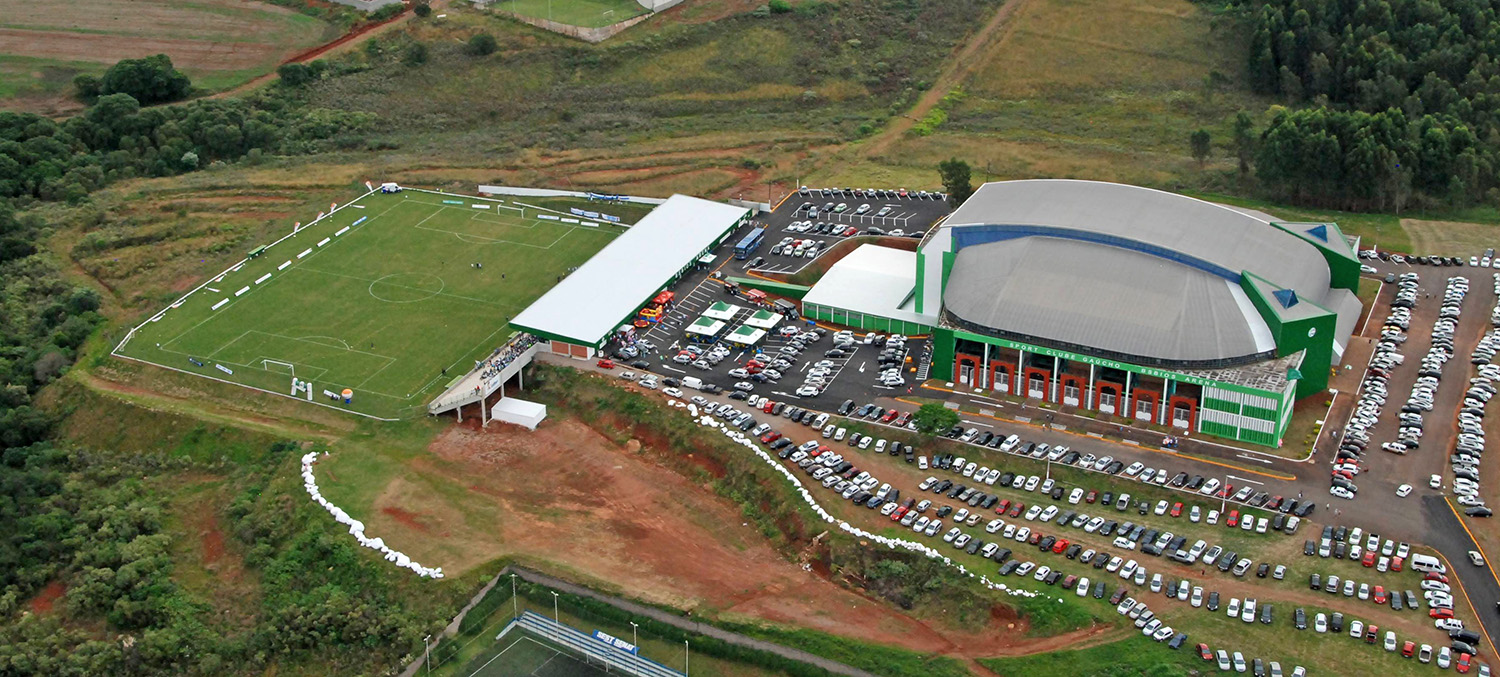
- Interactive map of Ginásio Teixeirinha
- Full name: Ginásio Teixeirinha
- Location: Passo Fundo, Brazil
- Coordinates: 28°16′28″S 52°26′20″W
- Capacity: 10,000

Construction
- Opened: 2004

Ginásio Teixeirinha is an indoor sporting arena located in Passo Fundo, Brazil. The capacity of the arena is 10,000 spectators. It hosts indoor sporting events such as basketball and volleyball, and also hosts concerts.
