= Ginásio Multidisciplinar =

Sporting arena in Campinas, Brazil

Coordinates: 22°48′54″S 47°4′17″W

Ginásio Multidisciplinar is an indoor sporting arena located in Campinas, Brazil. The capacity of the arena is 10,000.
