= Olympic Training Center (Rio de Janeiro) =

Sports training facility

- Centro Olímpico de Treinamento
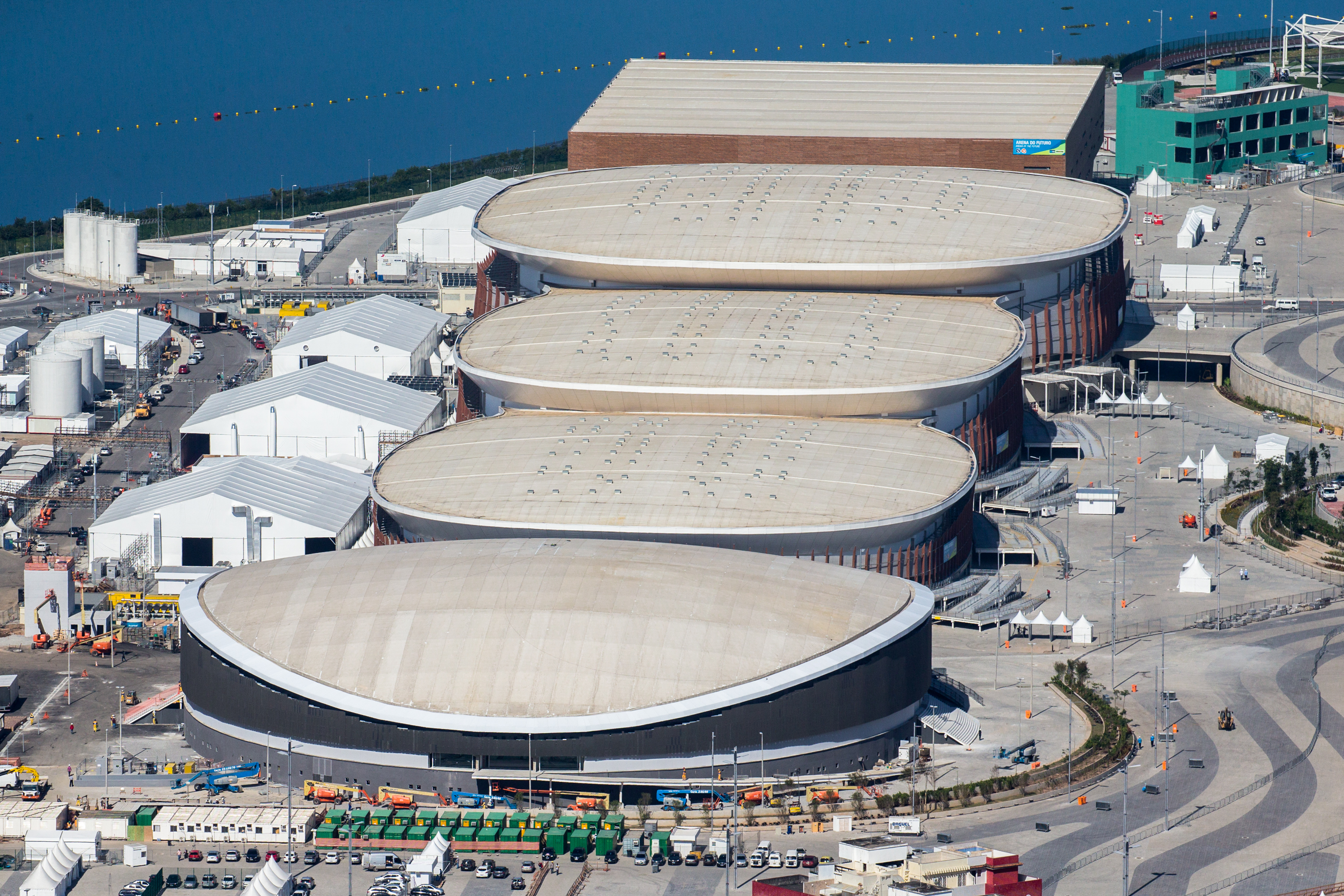
- Interactive map of Olympic Training Center
- Address: Rio de Janeiro; Brazil
- Location: Barra da Tijuca, Rio de Janeiro, Brazil
- Coordinates: 22.973883°S 43.395953°W
- Operator: City of Rio de Janeiro

Construction
- Groundbreaking: 2009
- Built: 2009-2016

Website
- https://adcentrolimpico.org.br/

The Rio de Janeiro Olympic Training Center (Portuguese: Centro Olímpico de Treinamento, COT) is a sports training facility in Barra da Tijuca, Brazil that opened after the 2016 Summer Olympics. The centre includes six venues used in the 2016 games and facilities created in the Barra Olympic Park footprint. The centre is located at the site of the former Nelson Piquet International Autodrome - Jacarepaguá.

== Purpose ==
Its purpose is to establish infrastructure for the development of Brazilian athletes, including teaching and training, with the help of professionals and scientific education. It is inspired and follows similar projects from other countries such as the Australian Institute of Sport in Canberra, Australia, United States Olympic Training Center in Colorado Springs, and the English Institute of Sport. The first sports are athletics, boxing, fencing, water sports, gymnastics, wrestling, judo, taekwondo, table tennis, archery, tennis, badminton and weightlifting.

Construction began in 2009 and finished in 2016. Funds were planned to come from the Ministry of Sports, from sponsorship contracts and tax incentives.

== Process ==
Athletes undergo a battery of tests and use the physical and professional structure to support their training. At the end, the athletes and the technical committee return home to continue the training and disseminate knowledge acquired.

== Facilities ==
The Center encompasses eight permanent sport facilities in the Barra da Tijuca region. Two were part of the City of Sports Complex established for the 2007 Pan American Games: the HSBC Arena and the Maria Lenk Aquatic Center. A third venue, the Barra Velodrome was demolished and replaced by the Rio Olympic Velodrome.

Two indoor arenas are included: Carioca Arenas 1 and 2, an Olympic Tennis Center (a tennis stadium with 15 ancillary courts) and the Olympic Aquatics Stadium.

The Olympic Tennis Stadium has a capacity of 8,250 spectators; the Olympic Velodrome hosts 5,000 spectators and the Olympic Aquatics Stadium 18,000 spectators. Arena Carioca 1 (16,000) hosted basketball games, and the Paralympic wheelchair basketball and wheelchair rugby games. Arena Carioca 2 (10,000) hosted the Olympic judo and wrestling events, and the Paralympic boccia events. Arena Carioca 3 (10,000) hosted the Olympic taekwondo and fencing competitions and the Paralympic judo and wheelchair fencing tournaments. Future Arena (a temporary structure demolished and re-purposed after the Games) hosted the Olympic handball matches and the Paralympic goalball matches (12,000).

The venues also have infrastructure for services in nutrition, physiotherapy & sports medicine, athlete career support, physiological, biomechanical, psychological and biochemical assessment as well as lecture halls and seminar rooms.

In October 2025, the Olympic Training Center was visited by the Panam Sports Evaluation Commission as part of its inspection of the Rio de Janeiro-Niteroi bid for the 2031 Pan American Games. The venue was toured alongside other facilities from the 2016 Summer Olympics, including Barra Olympic Park and Deodoro Olympic Park.
