= Olympic Velodrome (Seoul) =

Olympic cycling venue in Seoul, South Korea

Coordinates: 37.51693°N 127.123334°E

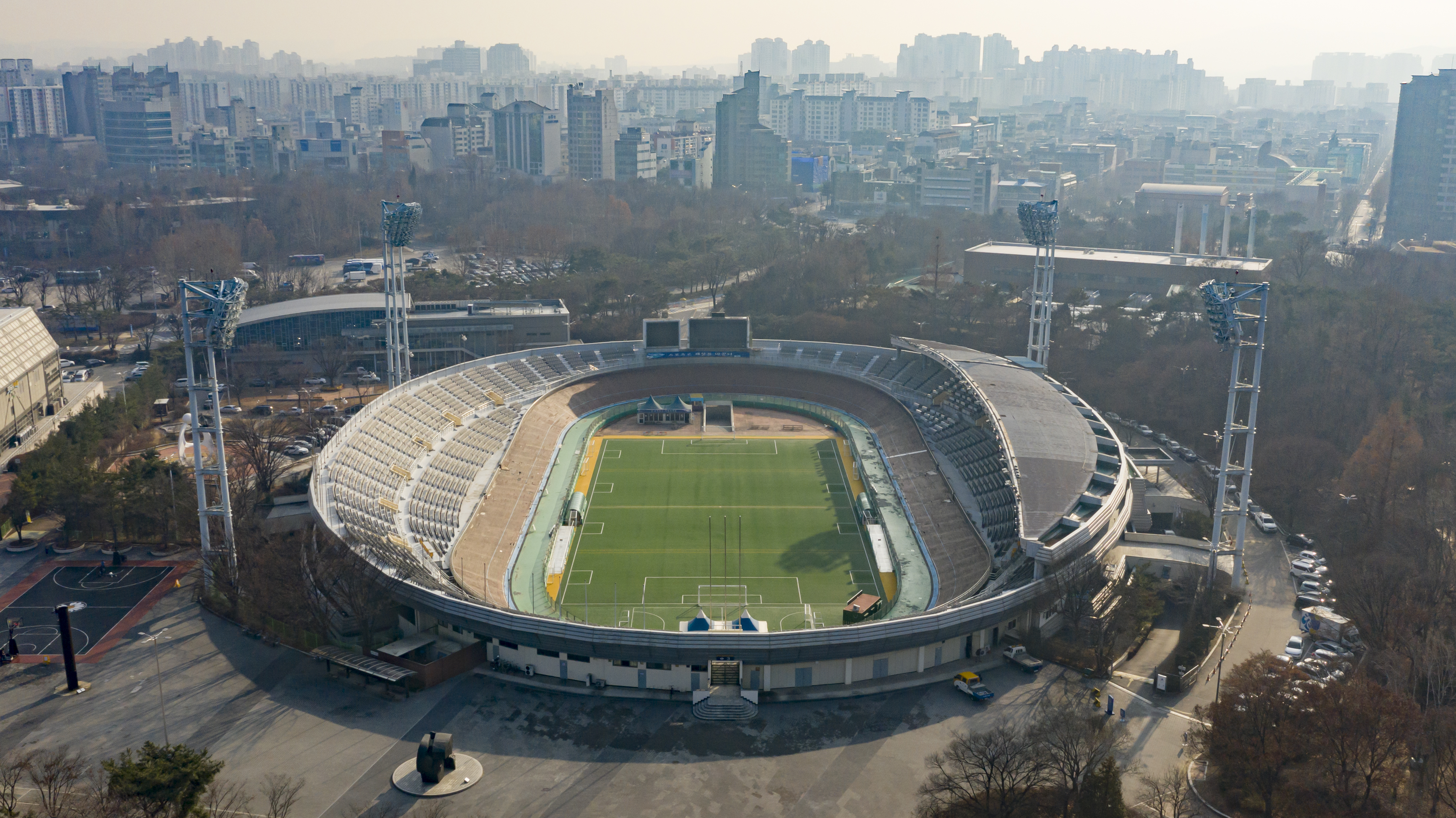
The Seoul Olympic Velodrome in 2020

The Seoul Olympic Cyclodrome is a velodrome located at the Olympic Park in Seoul, South Korea. It hosted the track cycling events of the 1988 Summer Olympics. It was constructed from September 1984 to April 1986 and has a seating capacity of 6,000.

== See also ==
- List of cycling tracks and velodromes
