= Barra Velodrome =

Cycling venue in Rio de Janeiro, Brazil

Coordinates: 22°58′47″S 43°23′40″W

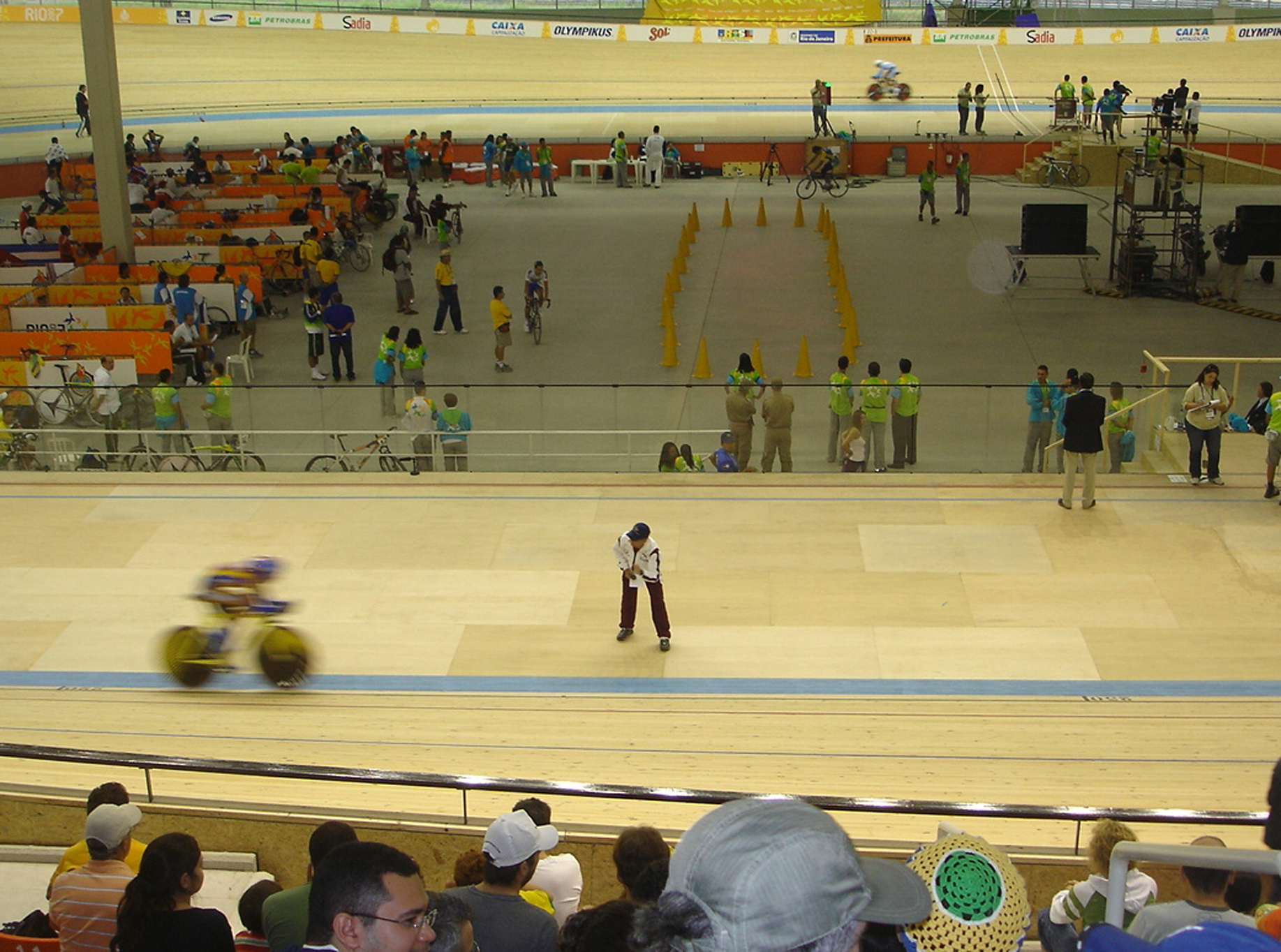
- Interior view of the Barra Velodrome, during the 2007 Pan American Games
- Interactive map of Barra Velodrome
- Location: Rio de Janeiro, Brazil
- Capacity: 5,000
- Field size: 250 m × 7 m (820 ft × 23 ft) track

Construction
- Opened: July 2007
- Demolished: 2013
- Cost: $35 million
- Architect: Sander Douma Architects

The Barra Velodrome was a track cycling venue located in Barra da Tijuca, in western Rio de Janeiro, and was one of three venues constructed as part of the City of Sports Complex for the 2007 Pan American Games, where it hosted track cycling and speed roller skating events. The venue was initially slated to host cycling events for the 2016 Summer Olympics, but was instead demolished in favour of the replacement Rio Olympic Velodrome, after the International Cycling Union (UCI) deemed the venue unsuitable for the games. The Olympic Aquatics Stadium now occupies the former site of the velodrome.

== History ==
The facilities planned for the 2007 Pan American Games included the City of Sports Complex on the location of the Nelson Piquet International Autodrome, which encompassed an indoor arena, an aquatic center and a velodrome. The indoor arena for track cycling would be the first in Brazil and second in South America with a wooden track, designed and built in the Netherlands with Siberian Pine by Sander Douma Architects. It would originally be a temporary facility, but by 2007 the Rio city administration decided to turn into a permanent one. Legal and bureaucratic issues made construction, which was supposed to have ended by the end of 2005, only pick up in early 2006, and the buildings were delivered in July 2007, shortly before the games. After the conclusion of the games, the Barra Velodrome quickly became obsolete, as the venue failed to attract events in the years following the Pan American Games.

After Rio de Janeiro secured the rights to host the 2016 Summer Olympics and Paralympics, the velodrome was penned as the venue for track cycling. However, in 2013 the International Cycling Union (UCI) declared, to the dismay of taxpayers and local media, that the Barra Velodrome was not suitable to host Olympic events. The UCI cited various problems with the venue infrastructure, such as the pillars of the venue partially obscuring the view of the spectators and judges, and the track's design being unable to allow a cyclist to travel as fast as 85 km/h (53 mph) and 110 km/h (68 mph) - the requirement by Olympic standards. Riders during the 2007 Pan American Games were only able to achieve top speeds of 70 km/h (43 mph).

It was decided after the fact that a brand new velodrome was to be built for the Olympics, and the Barra Velodrome be demolished, in a new plan for the rechristened Barra Olympic Park. Upgrading the existing velodrome to meet the standard required by the UCI, according to the Mayor of Rio de Janeiro, Eduardo Paes, would cost equally as much as building a brand new venue. The original pieces of the velodrome, including entire track support structure, the grandstand seats, metallic structure and roof, light fixtures, windows, doors, elevator, pipes, aluminium frames, ducts, hydraulic and fire venue material, and the power substation electrical equipment, among other items, were sent to Pinhais, in the Brazilian state of Paraná, for use in construction projects in the city. The Rio Olympic Velodrome, constructed north of the site of the Barra Velodrome, served as its replacement, hosting track cycling events at the 2016 Summer Olympics. The temporary Olympic Aquatics Stadium, which hosted swimming and water polo, was built on the former site of the Barra Velodrome. It will be succeeded by two smaller swimming venues after the conclusion of the games.

== See also ==
- List of cycling tracks and velodromes
- Venues of the 2007 Pan American Games
