= List of cyclists at the 2016 Summer Olympics =

This is a list of cyclists who competed at the 2016 Summer Olympics in Rio de Janeiro, Brazil. The cyclists were competing in 18 cycling events in the disciplines: BMX, mountain biking, road cycling, and track cycling.

== 2016 Olympic cyclists ==
Nation	Cyclist	Discipline	Event	Olympic app.	Champion since 2012 Olympics
Algeria	Abderrahmane Mansouri	Road Cycling	Men's road race	Debut	
Algeria	Youcef Reguigui	Road Cycling	Men's road race	Debut	
Algeria	Youcef Reguigui	Road Cycling	Men's road time trial	Debut	
Argentina	Daniel Díaz	Road Cycling	Men's road race	Debut	
Argentina	Maximiliano Richeze	Road Cycling	Men's road race	2nd	
Argentina	Eduardo Sepúlveda	Road Cycling	Men's road race	Debut	
Argentina	Eduardo Sepúlveda	Road Cycling	Men's road time trial	Debut	
Australia	Scott Bowden	Road Cycling	Men's road race	Debut	
Australia	Simon Clarke	Road Cycling	Men's road race	Debut	
Australia	Rohan Dennis	Road Cycling	Men's road race	Debut	
Australia	Rohan Dennis	Road Cycling	Men's road time trial	Debut	
Australia	Richie Porte	Road Cycling	Men's road race	Debut	
Austria	Stefan Denifl	Road Cycling	Men's road race	Debut	
Austria	Georg Preidler	Road Cycling	Men's road race	Debut	
Austria	Georg Preidler	Road Cycling	Men's road time trial	Debut	
Belgium	Greg Van Avermaet	Road Cycling	Men's road race	2nd	
Colombia	Esteban Chaves	Road cycling	Men's road race	Debut	
Colombia	Sergio Henao	Road cycling	Men's road race	2nd	
Colombia	Miguel Ángel López	Road cycling	Men's road race	Debut	
Colombia	Jarlinson Pantano	Road cycling	Men's road race	Debut	
Colombia	Rigoberto Urán	Road cycling	Men's road race	3rd	
Ecuador	Byron Guamá	Road cycling	Men's road race	2nd	
Ethiopia	Tsgabu Grmay	Road cycling	Men's road race	Debut	
France	Grégory Baugé	Track cycling	Men's sprint		2015 World Champion
France	Grégory Baugé	Track cycling	Men's team sprint		2015 World Champion
France	Laurie Berthon	Track cycling	Women's omnium		
France	Thomas Boudat	Track cycling	Men's omnium		2014 World Champion
France	Sandie Clair	Track cycling	Women's sprint		
France	Sandie Clair	Track cycling	Women's team sprint		
France	Sandie Clair	Track cycling	Women's keirin		
France	Virginie Cueff	Track cycling	Women's sprint		
France	Virginie Cueff	Track cycling	Women's team sprint		
France	Virginie Cueff	Track cycling	Women's keirin		
France	Michaël D'Almeida	Track cycling	Men's team sprint		2015 World Champion
France	François Pervis	Track cycling	Men's sprint		2014, 2015 World Champion
France	François Pervis	Track cycling	Men's team sprint		
France	François Pervis	Track cycling	Men's keirin		2014 World Champion
Greece	Ioannis Tamouridis	Road cycling	Men's road race	2nd	
Hong Kong	Leung Chun Wing	Road cycling	Men's road race	Debut	
Netherlands	Anna van der Breggen	Road cycling	Women's road race	Debut	
Netherlands	Anna van der Breggen	Road cycling	Women's road time trial	Debut	
Netherlands	Ellen van Dijk	Road cycling	Women's road race	2nd	
Netherlands	Ellen van Dijk	Road cycling	Women's road time trial	2nd	2013 World Champion; 2015 European Games Champion
Netherlands	Tom Dumoulin	Road cycling	Men's road race	Debut	
Netherlands	Tom Dumoulin	Road cycling	Men's road time trial	Debut	
Netherlands	Rudi van Houts	Mountain biking	Men's cross-country	3rd	
Netherlands	Steven Kruijswijk	Road cycling	Men's road race	Debut	
Netherlands	Bauke Mollema	Road cycling	Men's road race	Debut	
Netherlands	Wout Poels	Road cycling	Men's road race	Debut	
Netherlands	Wout Poels	Road cycling	Men's road time trial	Debut	
Netherlands	Annemiek van Vleuten	Road cycling	Women's road race	2nd	
Netherlands	Marianne Vos	Road cycling	Women's road race	3rd	2012 Olympic Champion; 2012, 2013 World Champion
United Arab Emirates	Yousif Mirza	Road cycling	Men's road race	Debut	
