= Cycling at the 2016 Summer Olympics =

Cycling at the Games of the XXXI Olympiad
- Pictograms from top: BMX, Mountain, Road and Track cycling.
- Venue: Olympic BMX Center (BMX); Mountain Bike Centre (Mountain); Fort Copacabana, Pontal (Road); Rio Olympic Velodrome (Track)
- Dates: 6–21 August 2016
- No. of events: 18
- Competitors: from 80 nations

The cycling competitions of the 2016 Summer Olympics in Rio de Janeiro were held at four venues scheduled to host eighteen events between 6 and 21 August.

The venues were Fort Copacabana in the Copacabana, venues were in Clusters for the start and finish of the road cycling race, Pontal in the Barra Cluster for the road cycling time trial competitions, the Rio Olympic Velodrome, also in the Barra Cluster for track cycling, the Olympic BMX Center for BMX and the Mountain Bike Centre for mountain biking, both in the Deodoro Cluster.

Cycling competitions had been contested in every Summer Olympics programme since the first modern Olympiad in 1896 alongside athletics, artistic gymnastics, fencing and swimming.

Since the 1896 contests, which featured five track events and an 87 km road race from Athens to Marathon and back, Olympic cycling had gradually evolved to include women's competitions, mountain biking and BMX, resulting to the current eighteen events.

In February 2013, the International Cycling Union (UCI) announced its intention to petition the IOC to extend the cycling programme by three events for both men and women: the return of the points races (track event), a BMX freestyle event and a mountain bike eliminator. However, in August 2013, the IOC stated that the cycling programme would be the same as in 2012. There were no changes made to the 2016 Olympic cycling programme compared to the cycling at the 2012 Olympics.

== Venues ==
Venue	Cluster	Sport	Date	Medal events	Capacity
Fort Copacabana	Copacabana Cluster	Road cycling (road race)	6–7 August	2	5000 (seating); Unlimited (standing) (Note: There will be free viewing areas alongside the route.)
Mountain Bike Centre	Deodoro Cluster	Mountain biking	20–21 August	2	5000 (seating); 20000 (standing)
Olympic BMX Center	Deodoro Cluster	BMX	17–19 August	2	5000
Pontal	Barra Cluster	Road cycling (time trial)	10 August	2	5000 (seating); Unlimited (standing)
Rio Olympic Velodrome	Barra Cluster	Track cycling	11–16 August	10	7500

== Participation ==
=== Participating nations ===
Brazil, as the host country, receives guaranteed quota place in case it would not qualify any qualification places.

- Algeria (2)
- Argentina (6)
- Australia (31)
- Austria (4)
- Azerbaijan (3)
- Belarus (4)
- Belgium (14)
- Bolivia (1)
- Brazil (10)
- Bulgaria (1)
- Canada (19)
- Chile (2)
- China (14)
- Colombia (15)
- Costa Rica (2)
- Croatia (2)
- Cuba (3)
- Cyprus (1)
- Czech Republic (12)
- Denmark (13)
- Dominican Republic (1)
- Ecuador (2)
- Egypt (1)
- Eritrea (1)
- Estonia (2)
- Ethiopia (1)
- Finland (1)
- France (22)
- Germany (29)
- Great Britain (26)
- Greece (3)
- Guam (1)
- Guatemala (1)
- Hong Kong (5)
- Hungary (1)
- Indonesia (1)
- Iran (3)
- Ireland (3)
- Israel (2)
- Italy (19)
- Japan (9)
- Kazakhstan (3)
- Kosovo (1)
- Laos (1)
- Latvia (4)
- Lesotho (1)
- Lithuania (4)
- Luxembourg (3)
- Malaysia (2)
- Mauritius (1)
- Mexico (4)
- Morocco (4)
- Namibia (3)
- Netherlands (26)
- New Zealand (19)
- Norway (7)
- Poland (17)
- Portugal (6)
- Puerto Rico (1)
- Romania (1)
- Russia (16)
- Rwanda (2)
- Serbia (2)
- Slovakia (2)
- Slovenia (7)
- South Africa (7)
- South Korea (8)
- Spain (12)
- Sweden (4)
- Switzerland (15)
- Chinese Taipei (2)
- Thailand (2)
- Timor-Leste (1)
- Trinidad and Tobago (1)
- Tunisia (1)
- Turkey (2)
- Ukraine (7)
- United Arab Emirates (1)
- United States (21)
- Venezuela (9)

== Competition schedule ==
Legend
H	Heats/preliminaries	¼	Quarter-finals	½	Semi-finals	F	Final

BMX, mountain biking and road cycling
Event↓/Date →	Sat 6	Sun 7	Wed 10	Wed 17	Thu 18	Fri 19		Sat 20	Sun 21
Men's BMX				H	¼	½	F		
Women's BMX				H		½	F		
Mountain biking
Men's cross-country									F
Women's cross-country								F	
Road cycling
Men's road race	F								
Men's time trial			F						
Women's road race		F							
Women's time trial			F						

Track cycling
Date →	Thu 11			Fri 12			Sat 13			Sun 14			Mon 15			Tue 16		
Event ↓	E			E			M	E		E			M	E		M	E	
Men's keirin																H	½	F
Men's omnium										SR	IP	ER	TT	FL	PR			
Men's sprint				H			¼	½		F								
Men's team pursuit	H			½		F												
Men's team sprint	H	½	F															
Women's keirin							H	½	F									
Women's omnium													SR	IP	ER	TT	FL	PR
Women's sprint										H						¼	½	F
Women's team pursuit	H						½	F										
Women's team sprint				H	½	F												

M = Morning session, E = Evening session
FL = Flying lap, PR = Points pace, ER = Elimination race, IP = Individual pursuit, SR = Scratch race, TT = Time trial

== Medalists ==
=== Medal table ===
Rank	Nation	Gold	Silver	Bronze	Total
1	Great Britain	6	4	2	12
2	Netherlands	2	3	1	6
3	United States	2	3	0	5
4	Switzerland	2	0	0	2
5	Sweden	1	1	0	2
6	Belgium	1	0	1	2
6	Colombia	1	0	1	2
6	Germany	1	0	1	2
6	Italy	1	0	1	2
10	China	1	0	0	1
11	Russia	0	2	1	3
12	Denmark	0	1	2	3
13	Australia	0	1	1	2
13	Poland	0	1	1	2
15	Czech Republic	0	1	0	1
15	New Zealand	0	1	0	1
17	Canada	0	0	2	2
18	France	0	0	1	1
18	Malaysia	0	0	1	1
18	Spain	0	0	1	1
18	Venezuela	0	0	1	1
Totals (21 entries)		18	18	18	54

== Road cycling ==
Games	Gold	Silver	Bronze
Men's road race	Greg Van Avermaet; Belgium	Jakob Fuglsang; Denmark	Rafał Majka; Poland
Men's time trial	Fabian Cancellara; Switzerland	Tom Dumoulin; Netherlands	Chris Froome; Great Britain
Women's road race	Anna van der Breggen; Netherlands	Emma Johansson; Sweden	Elisa Longo Borghini; Italy
Women's time trial	Kristin Armstrong; United States	Olga Zabelinskaya; Russia	Anna van der Breggen; Netherlands

== Track cycling ==
=== Men's ===
Games	Gold	Silver	Bronze
Keirin	Jason Kenny; Great Britain	Matthijs Büchli; Netherlands	Azizulhasni Awang; Malaysia
Omnium	Elia Viviani; Italy	Mark Cavendish; Great Britain	Lasse Norman Hansen; Denmark
Team pursuit	Great Britain; Ed Clancy; Steven Burke; Owain Doull; Bradley Wiggins	Australia; Alexander Edmondson; Jack Bobridge; Michael Hepburn; Sam Welsford; Callum Scotson	Denmark; Lasse Norman Hansen; Niklas Larsen; Frederik Madsen; Casper von Folsach; Rasmus Quaade
Sprint	Jason Kenny; Great Britain	Callum Skinner; Great Britain	Denis Dmitriev; Russia
Team sprint	Great Britain; Philip Hindes; Jason Kenny; Callum Skinner	New Zealand; Eddie Dawkins; Ethan Mitchell; Sam Webster	France; Grégory Baugé; Michaël D'Almeida; François Pervis

=== Women's ===
Games	Gold	Silver	Bronze
Keirin	Elis Ligtlee; Netherlands	Becky James; Great Britain	Anna Meares; Australia
Omnium	Laura Trott; Great Britain	Sarah Hammer; United States	Jolien D'Hoore; Belgium
Team pursuit	Great Britain; Katie Archibald; Laura Trott; Elinor Barker; Joanna Rowsell Shand	United States; Sarah Hammer; Kelly Catlin; Chloé Dygert; Jennifer Valente	Canada; Allison Beveridge; Jasmin Glaesser; Kirsti Lay; Georgia Simmerling; Laura Brown
Sprint	Kristina Vogel; Germany	Becky James; Great Britain	Katy Marchant; Great Britain
Team sprint	China; Gong Jinjie; Zhong Tianshi	Russia; Daria Shmeleva; Anastasia Voynova	Germany; Miriam Welte; Kristina Vogel

== Mountain biking ==
Games	Gold	Silver	Bronze
Men's	Nino Schurter; Switzerland	Jaroslav Kulhavý; Czech Republic	Carlos Coloma Nicolás; Spain
Women's	Jenny Rissveds; Sweden	Maja Włoszczowska; Poland	Catharine Pendrel; Canada

== BMX ==
Games	Gold	Silver	Bronze
Men's	Connor Fields; United States	Jelle van Gorkom; Netherlands	Carlos Ramírez; Colombia
Women's	Mariana Pajón; Colombia	Alise Willoughby; United States	Stefany Hernández; Venezuela

== Broken records ==
At least one record in track cycling was set, the women's team pursuit Olympic record. After the 2012–13 track cycling season the UCI changed the women's 3000 metre team pursuit discipline for 3 riders into a format of 4000 metre with 4 riders.

=== Cycling track ===
Event	Round	Name	Nation	Time	Date	Record
Women's Team Pursuit	Qualifying	Great Britain	Great Britain	4:13.260	11 August	OR, WR
Men's Team Sprint	Qualifying	Great Britain	Great Britain	42.562	11 August	OR
Men's Team Sprint	First Round	New Zealand	New Zealand	42.535	11 August	OR
Men's Team Sprint	Finals	Great Britain	Great Britain	42.440	11 August	OR
Men's Sprint	Qualifying	Jason Kenny	Great Britain	9.551	12 August	OR
Women's Team Sprint	Qualifying	China	China	32.305	12 August	OR
Women's Team Sprint	First Round	China	China	31.928	12 August	OR, WR
Men's Team Pursuit	First Round	Great Britain	Great Britain	3:50.570	12 August	OR, WR
Men's Team Pursuit	Finals	Great Britain	Great Britain	3:50.265	12 August	OR, WR
Women's Team Pursuit	1st Round	United States	United States	4:12.282	13 August	OR, WR
Women's Team Pursuit	1st Round	Great Britain	Great Britain	4:12.152	13 August	OR, WR
Women's Team Pursuit	Finals	Great Britain	Great Britain	4:10.236	13 August	OR, WR
Omnium Individual Pursuit	Finals	Lasse Norman Hansen	Denmark	4:14.982	13 August	OR

In addition to the event records, Great Britain's Jason Kenny matched compatriate Chris Hoy as the most successful male cyclist in Olympic history, with six gold medals and a silver over three Games.

== See also ==
- Cycling at the 2016 Summer Paralympics
