= Venues of the 2016 Summer Olympics and Paralympics =

The 2016 Summer Olympics, officially known as the "Games of the XXXI Olympiad", was an international multi-sport event held in Rio de Janeiro, Brazil, from August 5 to August 21, 2016.^{[n 1]}

Events took place at eighteen existing venues (eight of which required some redevelopment), nine new venues constructed for the Summer Games, and seven temporary venues which were removed following the conclusion of the games. Each event was held in one of four geographically segregated Olympic clusters: Barra, Copacabana, Deodoro, Engenho de Dentro and Maracanã. The same was done for the 2007 Pan American Games. Several of the venues are located at the Barra Cluster Olympic Park. The largest venue at the games in terms of seating capacity is the Estádio do Maracanã, officially known as Jornalista Mário Filho Stadium, which can hold 74,738 spectators and served as the official Olympic Stadium, hosting the opening and closing ceremonies as well as football finals. In addition, five venues outside Rio de Janeiro hosted football events, in the cities of Brasília, Belo Horizonte, Manaus, Salvador and São Paulo.

For the first time since the 1900 Summer Olympics, the opening and closing Ceremonies for the Summer Olympics weren't held in the same place as the athletics events, and for the first time since the 1988 Summer Olympics, all gymnastics events took place in the same venue.

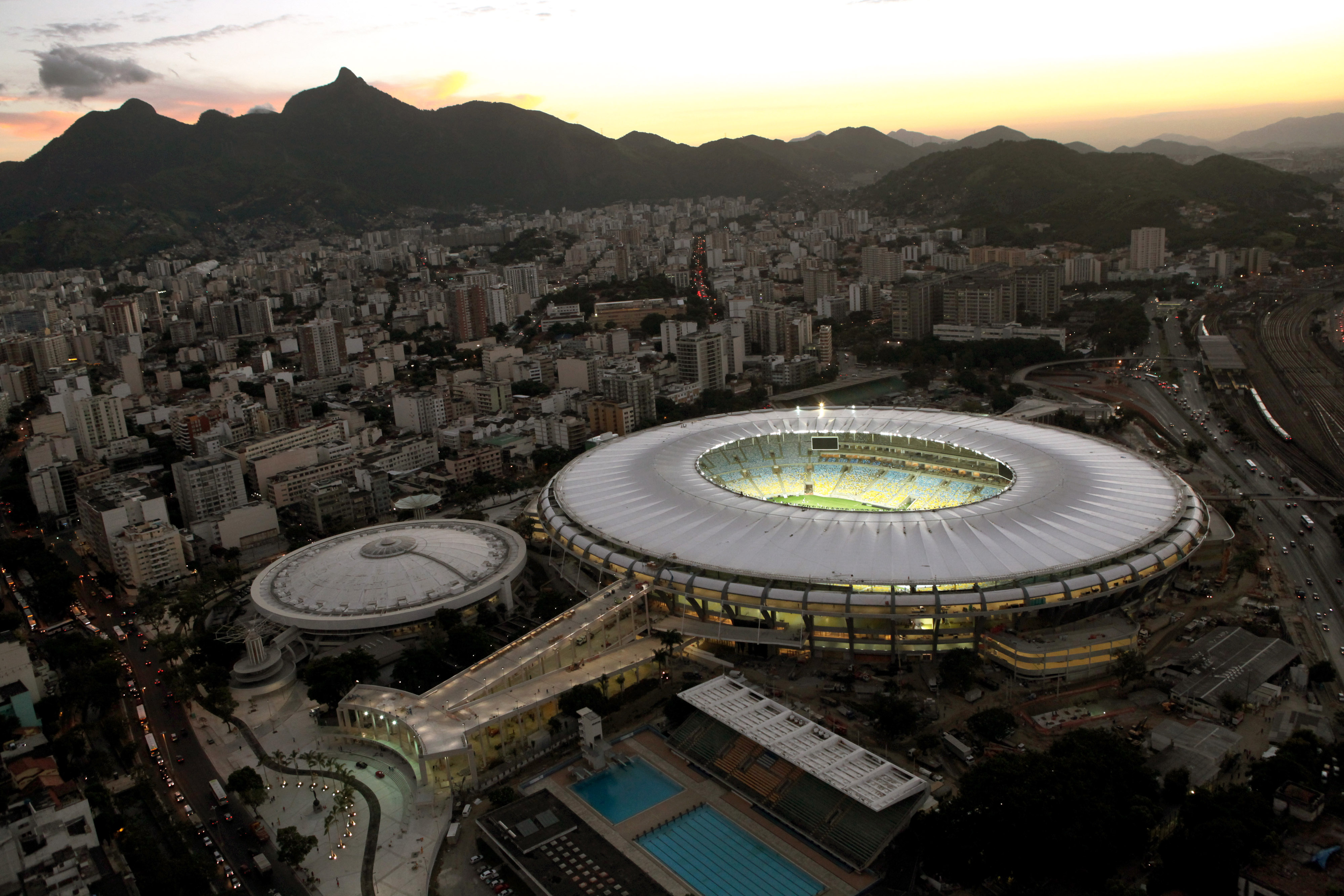
The Maracanã Stadium and the Maracanãzinho arena (left).

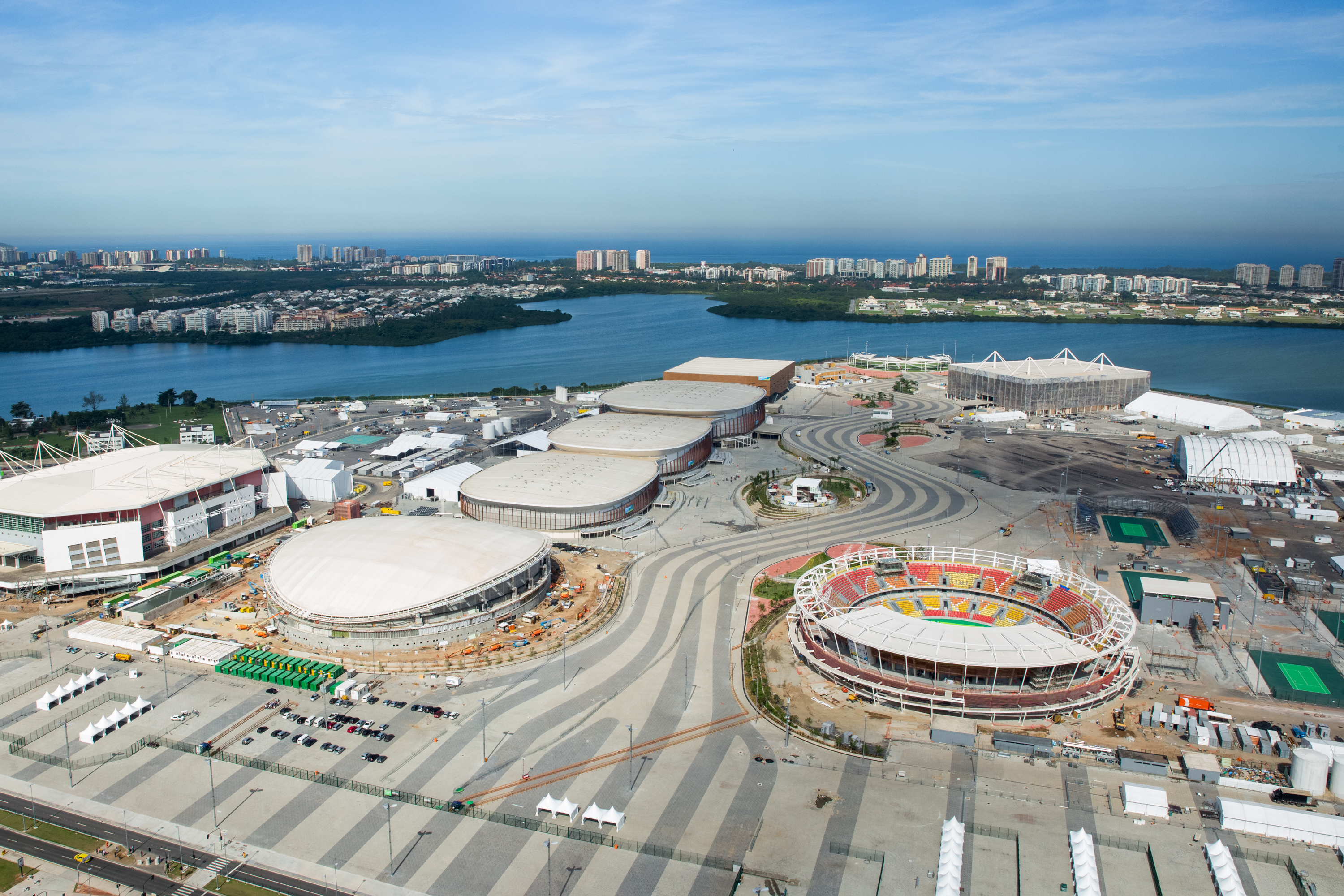
The Velodrome, Carioca Arena 3, 2 and 1 and Future Arena (in the background), and the Olympic Tennis Centre (on the right) at Barra Olympic Park

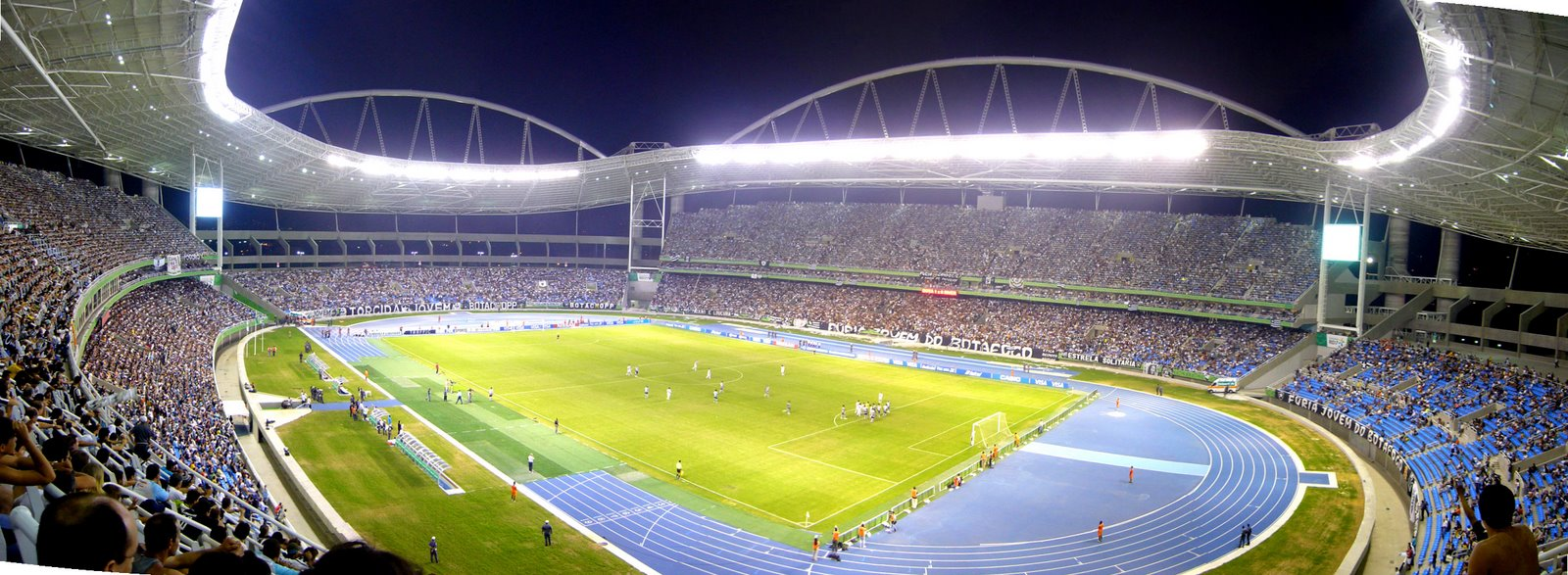
Estádio Nilton Santos

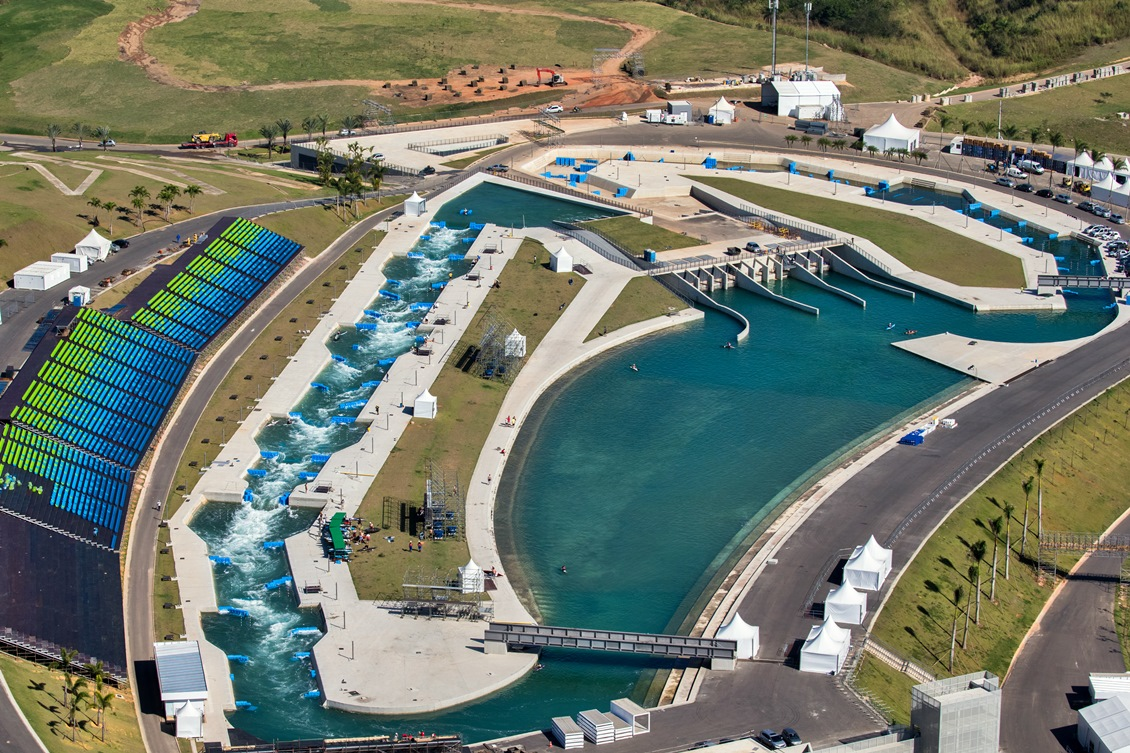
Deodoro Olympic Whitewater Stadium at Deodoro Radical Park

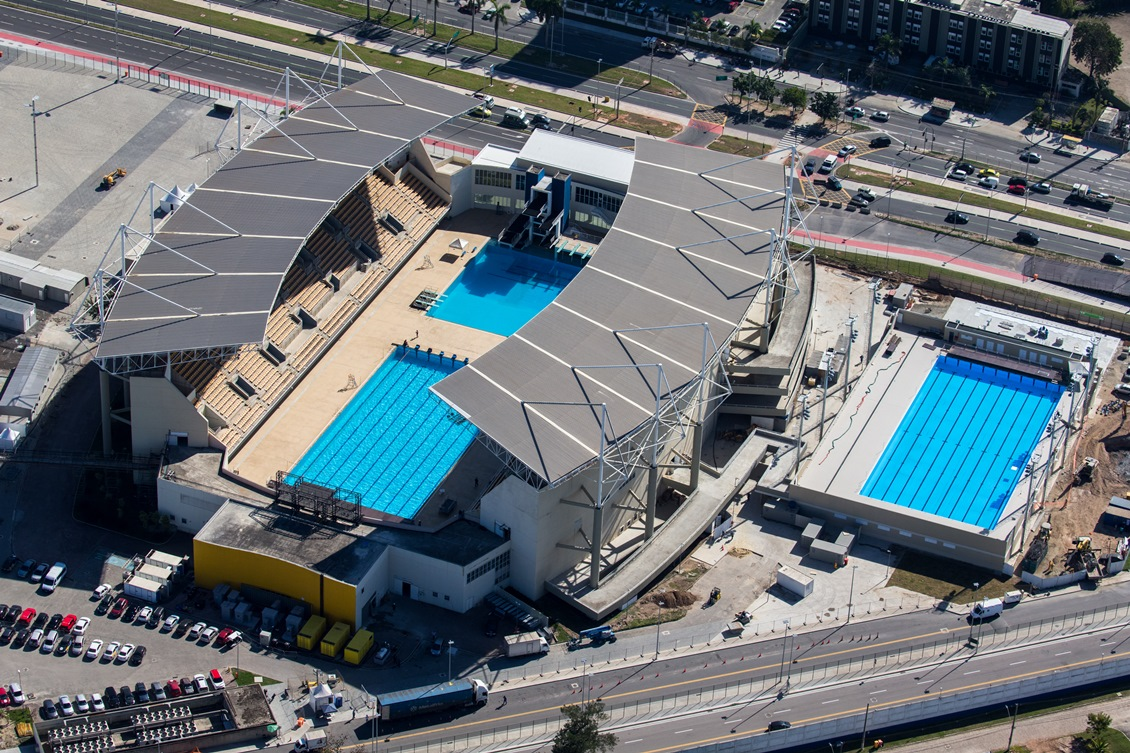
Maria Lenk Aquatics Center

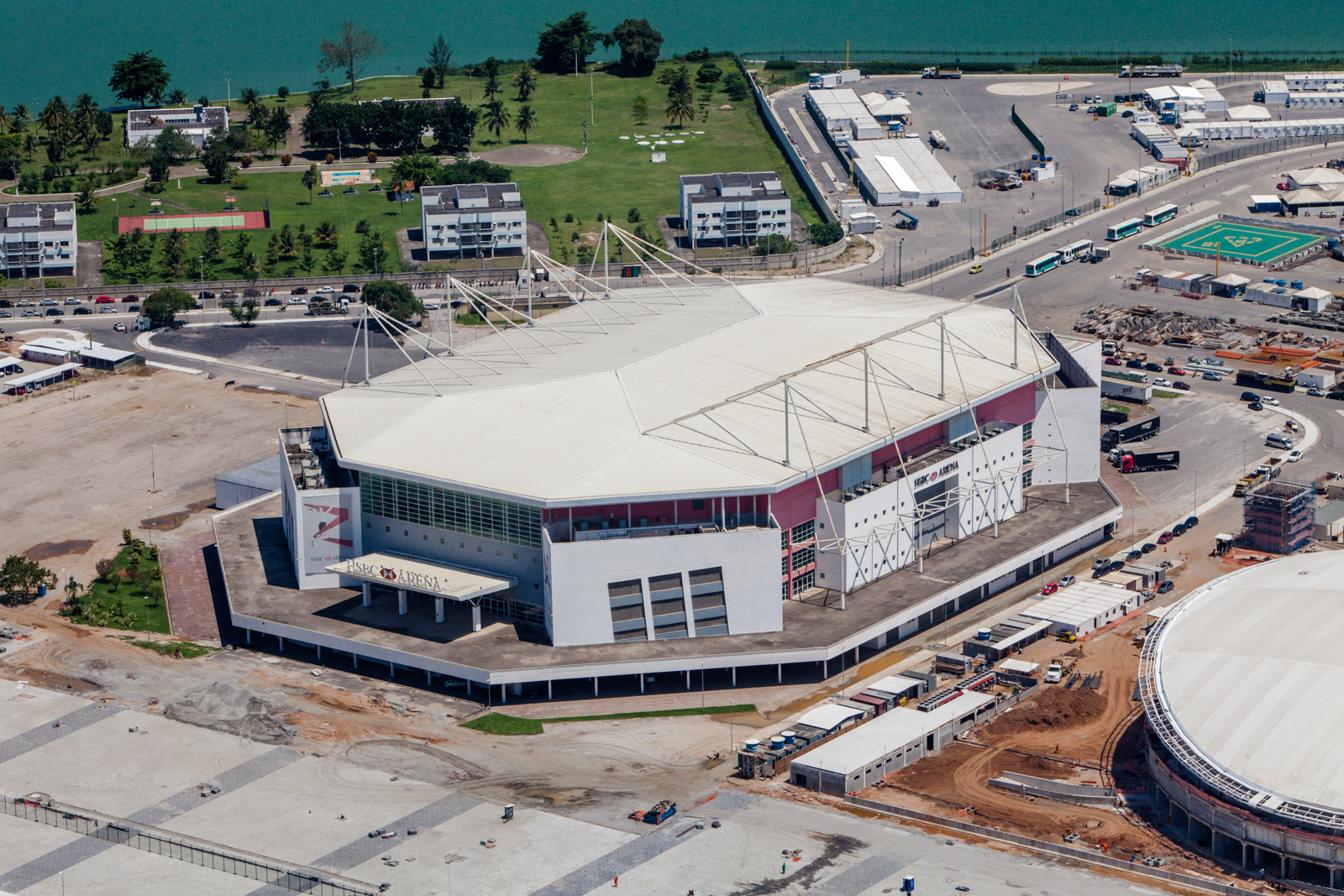
Rio Olympic Arena

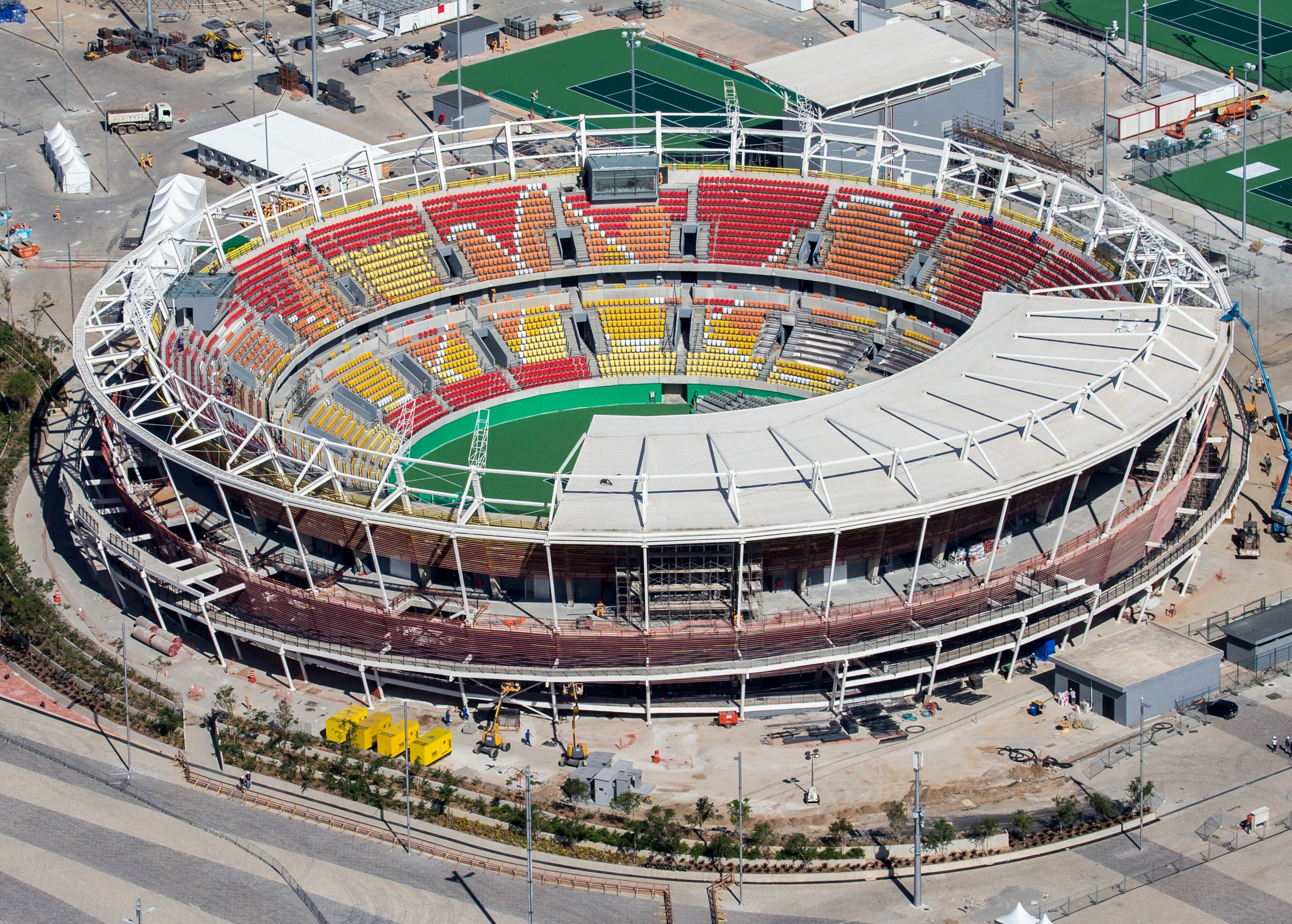
Olympic Tennis Centre

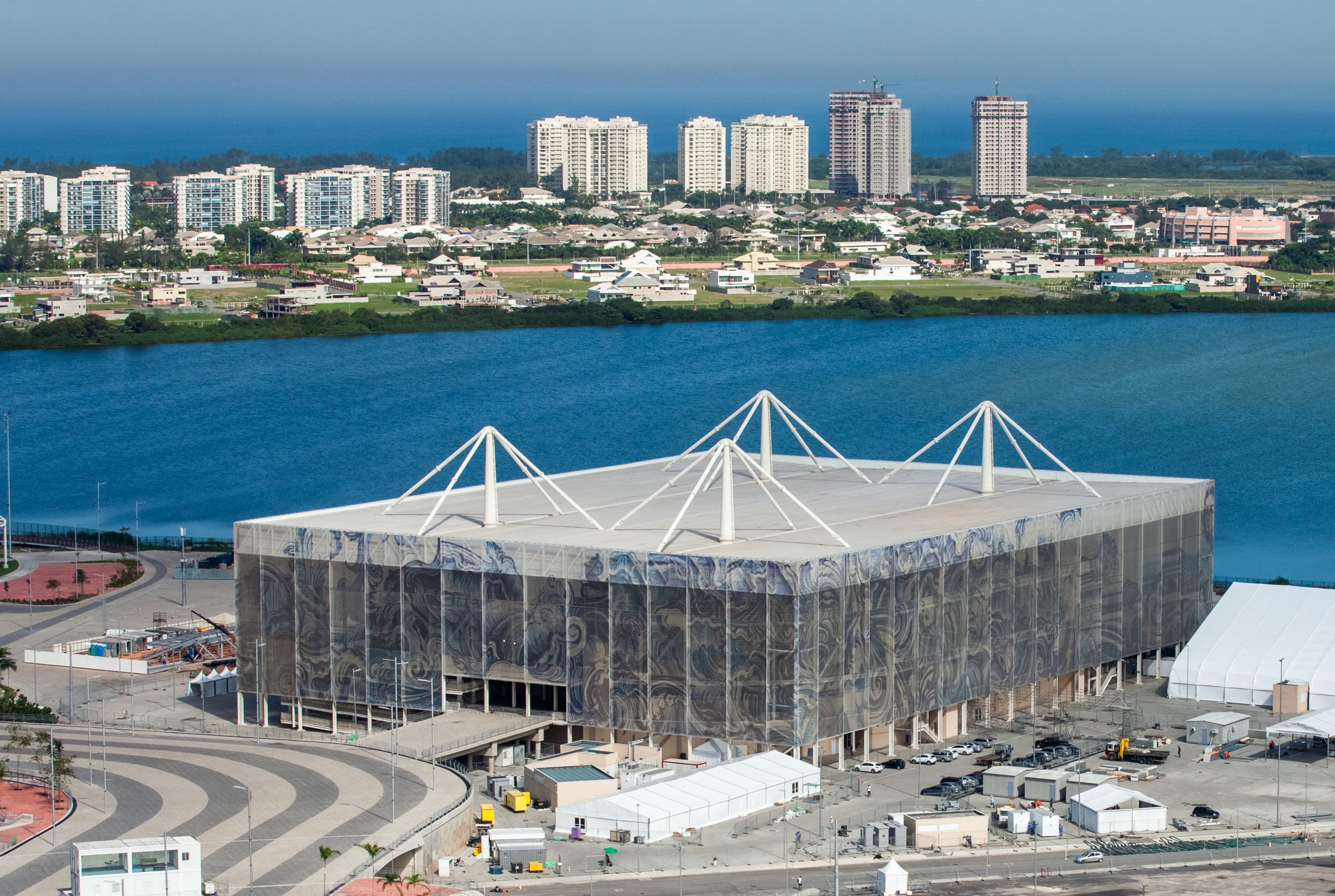
Olympic Aquatics Stadium

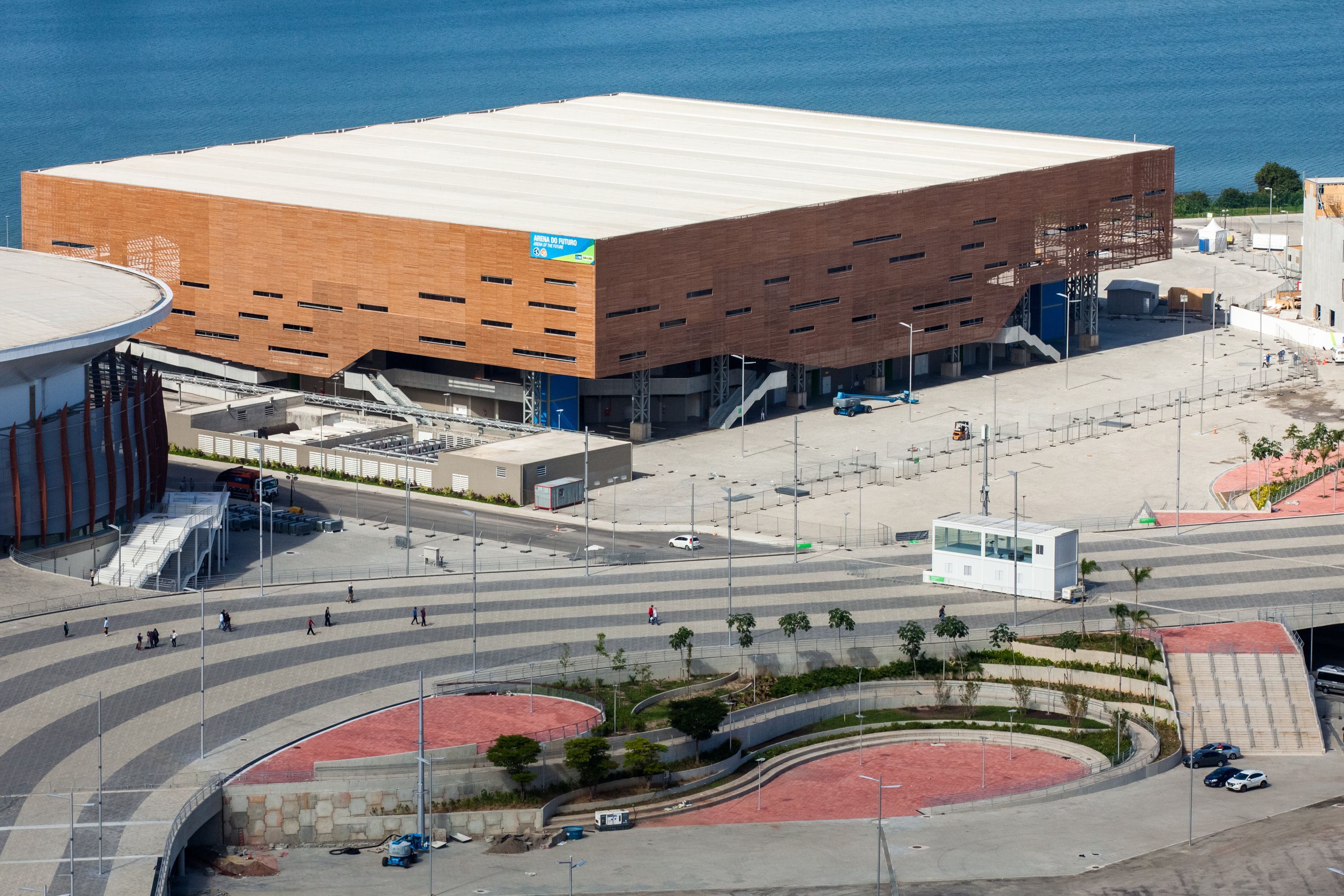
Future Arena

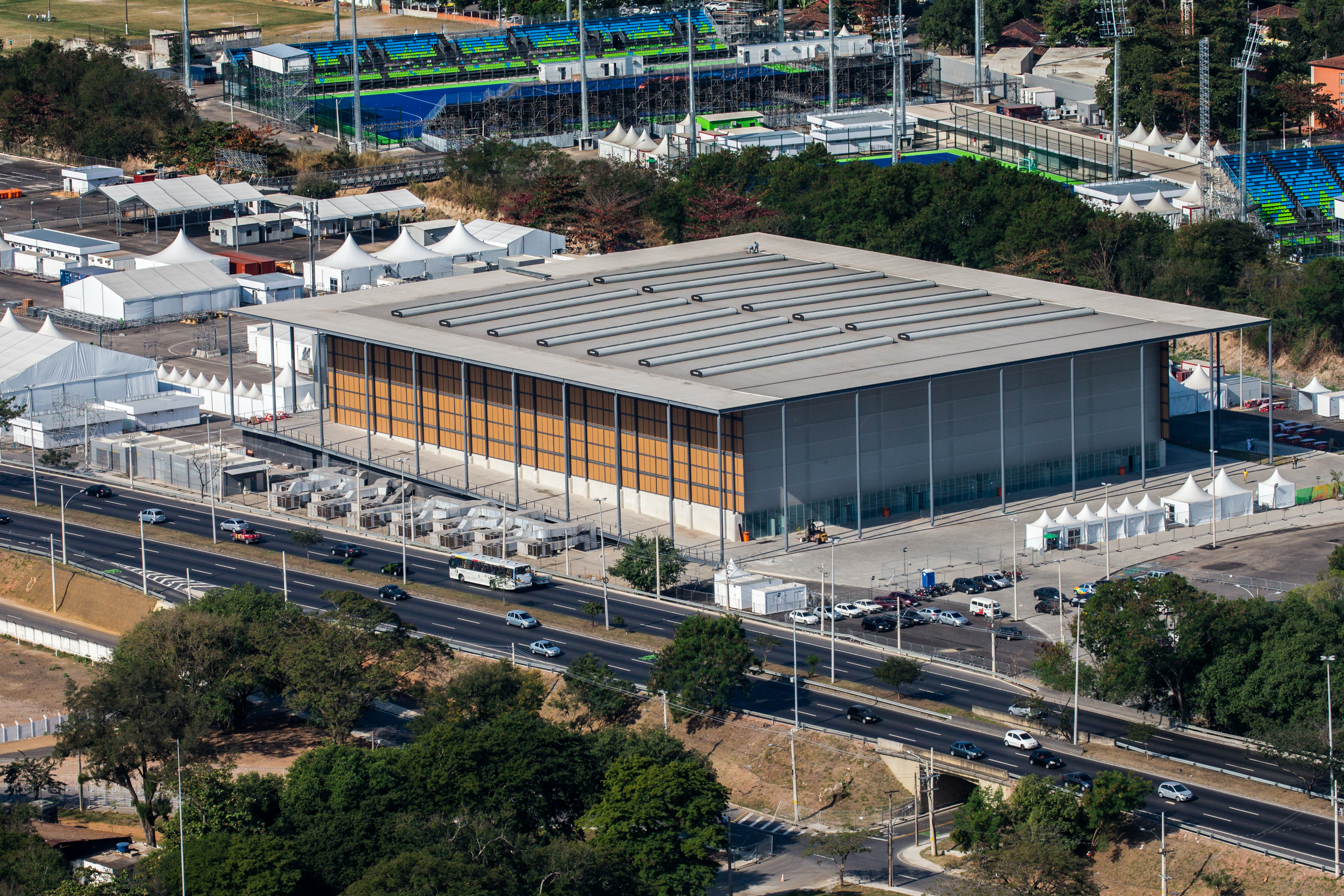
Youth Arena

== Venues ==
Legend
A	Existing (no permanent work required)
B	Existing (permanent work required)
C	Additional temporary (Games dependent)
D	New permanent

New competition venues
Venue	Sports			Capacity
Carioca Arena 1	D	Basketball		16,000
Carioca Arena 2	D	Judo and Wrestling		10,000
Carioca Arena 3	D	Fencing and Taekwondo		10,000
Olympic Aquatics Stadium	D	Swimming, Synchronized swimming (play-offs) and Waterpolo (play-offs)		15,000
Olympic BMX Centre	D	Cycling (BMX)		6,000
Olympic Golf Course	D	Golf		20,000
Olympic Hockey Centre	D	Field hockey		15,000 (10,000 court 1, 5,000 court 2)
Olympic Tennis Centre (Main Court)	D	Tennis		19,750
Deodoro Olympic Whitewater Stadium	D	Canoe/Kayak (slalom)		8,000
Rio Olympic Velodrome	D	Cycling (track)		5,000
Youth Arena (Deodoro)	D	Basketball (women's preliminary round), Modern pentathlon (fencing)		5,000
Existing competition venues
Venue		Sports		Capacity
Deodoro Aquatics Centre	A	Modern pentathlon (swimming)		2000
Maracanã Stadium	A	Ceremonies and Football (semifinal 2, finals)		74,738
Olympic Stadium (Engenhão)	B	Football (8 x group), Athletics (track and field)		60,000
Rodrigo de Freitas Lagoon	B	Rowing, Canoe/Kayak (sprint)		14,000
Maracanãzinho Arena	A	Volleyball		12,000
Maria Lenk Aquatics Center	B	Diving, Synchronized swimming (group matches), Waterpolo (group matches)		6,500
Marina da Glória	B	Sailing		10,000
Olympic Equestrian Center	B	Equestrian		14,000
Olympic Shooting Center	B	Shooting		N/A
Rio Olympic Arena (HSBC Arena)	A	Gymnastics		12,000
Riocentro – Pavilion 6	A	Boxing		9,000
Riocentro – Pavilion 3	A	Table tennis		7,000
Riocentro – Pavilion 4	A	Badminton		6,500
Sambódromo	B	Archery, Athletics (marathon)		36,000
Temporary competition venues
Venue		Sports		Capacity
Olympic Aquatics Stadium	C	Swimming, Synchronized swimming (play-offs) and Waterpolo (play-offs)		15,000
Copacabana Stadium	C	Beach volleyball		12,000
Deodoro Stadium	C	Modern pentathlon (riding, combined running and shooting), Rugby		15,000
Fort Copacabana	C	Marathon swimming, Cycling (road races), Triathlon		5,000
Future Arena	C	Handball		12,000
Mountain Bike Centre	C	Cycling (mountain biking)		5,000
Pontal	C	Athletics (racewalking), Cycling (time trials)		5,000
Riocentro – Pavilion 2	C	Weightlifting		6,500
Competition venues outside Rio de Janeiro
Venue		Sports	Location	Capacity
Mané Garrincha National Stadium	A	Football (8 x group, quarterfinals)	Brasília, Distrito Federal	69,394
Mineirão	A	Football (6 x group, quarterfinals, W semifinal, M 3rd place)	Belo Horizonte, Minas Gerais	58,170
Itaipava Arena Fonte Nova	A	Football (8 x group, quarterfinals)	Salvador, Bahia	51,700
Arena Corinthians	A	Football (6 x group, quarterfinals, M semifinal, W 3rd place)	São Paulo, São Paulo	48,234
Arena da Amazônia	A	Football (6 x group)	Manaus, Amazonas	40,549

== Notes ==
1. Although the Opening Ceremony of the Olympics occurred on 5 August, football matches began on 3 August.
