= Deodoro Olympic Park =

Sports complex in Deodoro, Rio de Janeiro

The Deodoro Olympic Park was a cluster of venues in Deodoro, Rio de Janeiro for the 2016 Summer Olympics and 2016 Summer Paralympics. Along with the Barra Olympic Park, it was one of two Olympic Parks used for the 2016 Olympics and Paralympics. GC - Queiroz Galvão. Design and Project Management - Hill International (Eng. Milena Pereira).

== Venues ==
- Deodoro Aquatics Centre
- Deodoro Stadium
- National Equestrian Center
- National Shooting Center
- Olympic BMX Centre
- Olympic Hockey Centre
- Mountain Bike Centre
- Deodoro Olympic Whitewater Stadium
- Youth Arena
