= Cycling at the 2016 Summer Olympics – Women's road time trial =

Coordinates: 23°1′49.70″S 43°28′25.21″W

Women's road time trial at the Games of the XXXI Olympiad
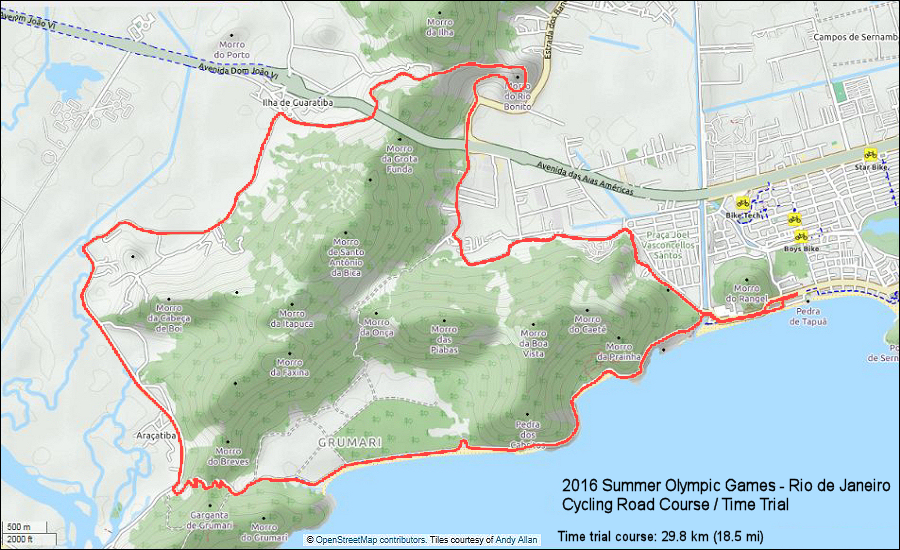
- Grumari Circuit - Pontal
- Venue: Pontal, Rio de Janeiro; 29.8 km (18.5 mi)
- Date: 10 August 2016
- Competitors: 25 from 18 nations
- Winning time: 44:26.42

Medalists
1st place, gold medalist(s)		Kristin Armstrong	United States
2nd place, silver medalist(s)		Olga Zabelinskaya	Russia
3rd place, bronze medalist(s)		Anna van der Breggen	Netherlands

The women's individual time trial was one of eighteen cycling events of the 2016 Olympic Games. The event started and finished on 10 August at Pontal, a small peninsula and beach area in the Recreio dos Bandeirantes neighborhood, located in the West Zone of Rio de Janeiro, Brazil. The race start and finish were part of the Barra venues cluster and one of seven temporary venues of the 2016 Summer Olympics.

== Pre-race favourites ==
American Kristin Armstrong was the 2008 and 2012 gold medalist. However, with the event scheduled one day before her forty-third birthday, Armstrong was not among the betting favorites.

The world champions after the 2012 Summer Olympics were the Dutch Ellen van Dijk (2013), German Lisa Brennauer (2014) and the New Zealand Linda Villumsen (2015). More recently, Ellen van Dijk had won the time trial in the 2016 Energiewacht Tour, beating Villumsen (3rd) and Brennauer (9th).

== Course ==
The women's course was one lap of the 29.8 km (18.5 mi) Grumari circuit. The race start and finish of the course were at the Tim Maia Square (Estrada do Pontal), then entering the Grumari circuit (clockwise) to reach the first climb (Grumari climb) after 9.7 km (6.0 mi) and the second climb (Grota Funda climb) at 19.2 km (11.9 mi).

== Start list and result ==
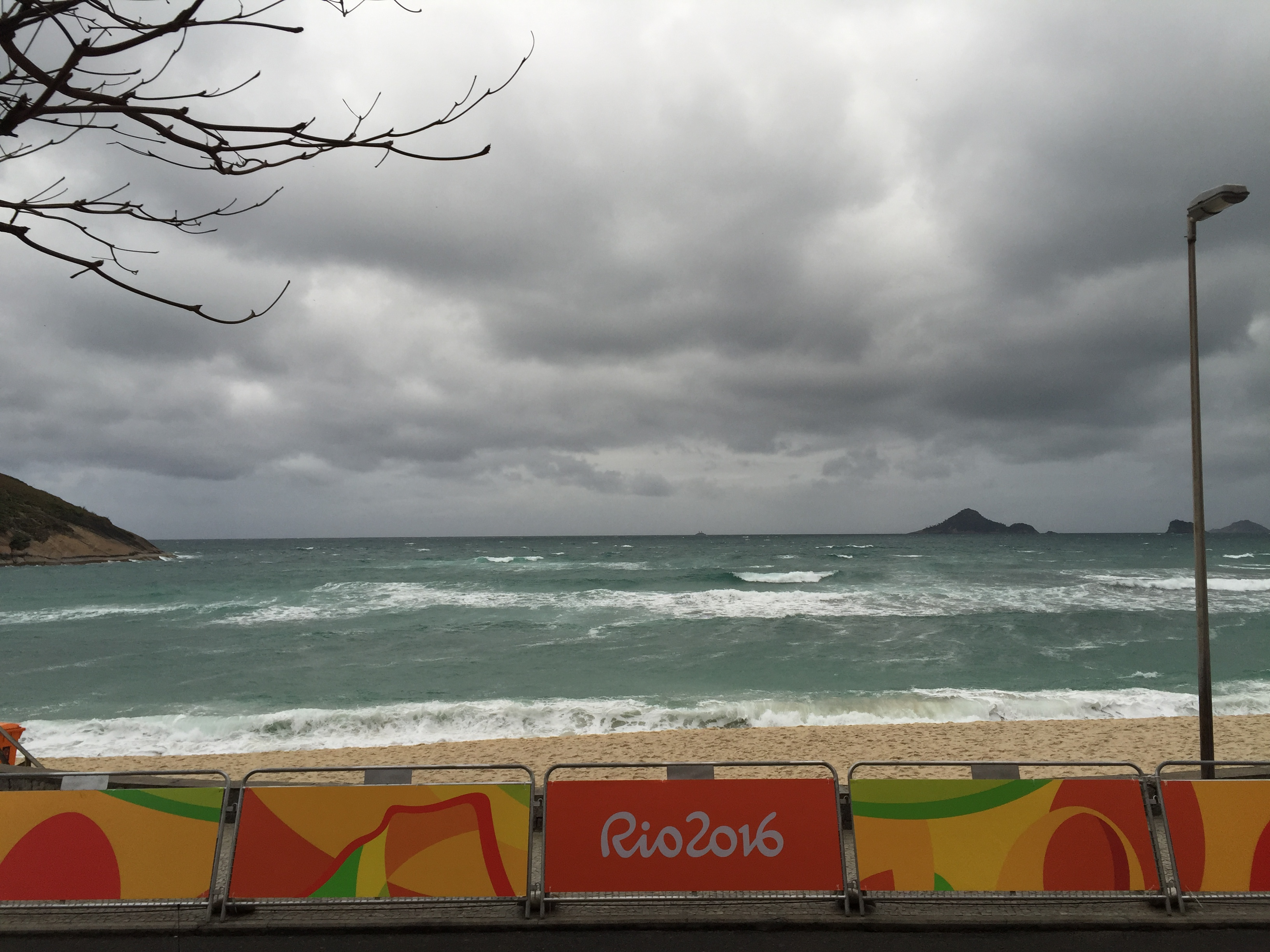
Wind and rainy weather at the start

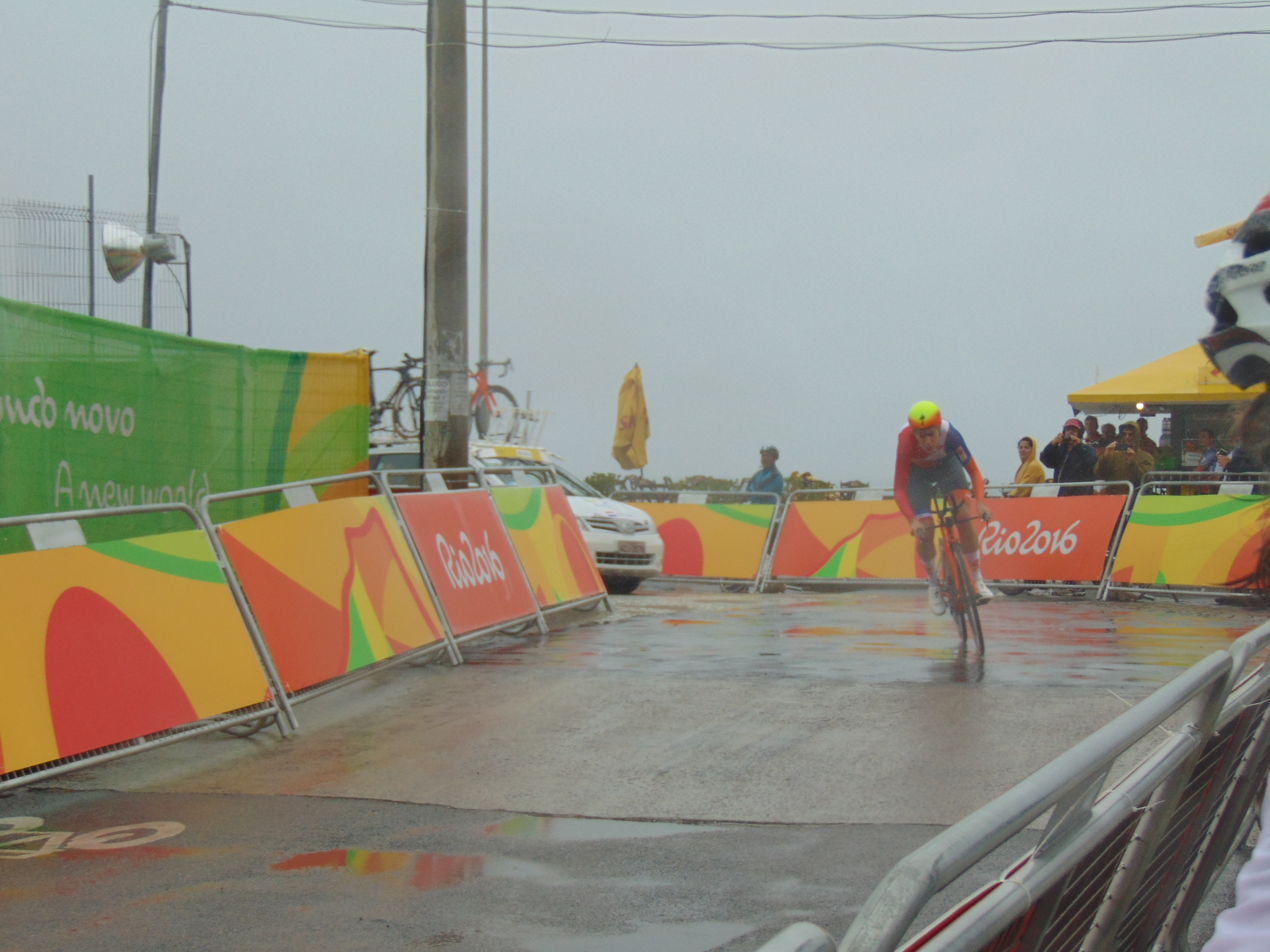
Ellen van Dijk crashed and finished fourth

The following 18 NOCs had qualified a total of 25 riders to compete in the road time trial event. The following riders were confirmed by their respective NOCs.

Pos.	No.	Rider	Country	Time
1st place, gold medalist(s)	1	Kristin Armstrong	United States	44:26.42
2nd place, silver medalist(s)	5	Olga Zabelinskaya	Russia	44:31.97
3rd place, bronze medalist(s)	3	Anna van der Breggen	Netherlands	44:37.80
4	7	Ellen van Dijk	Netherlands	44:48.74
5	9	Elisa Longo Borghini	Italy	44:51.94
6	2	Linda Villumsen	New Zealand	44:54.71
7	18	Tara Whitten	Canada	45:01.16
8	4	Lisa Brennauer	Germany	45:22.62
9	11	Katrin Garfoot	Australia	45:35.03
10	6	Evelyn Stevens	United States	46:00.08
11	16	Alena Amialiusik	Belarus	46:05.73
12	10	Ashleigh Moolman	South Africa	46:29.11
13	14	Karol-Ann Canuel	Canada	46:30.93
14	15	Emma Pooley	Great Britain	46:31.98
15	22	Eri Yonamine	Japan	46:43.09
16	12	Trixi Worrack	Germany	46:52.77
17	20	Lotta Lepisto	Finland	47:06.52
18	17	Katarzyna Niewiadoma	Poland	47:47.96
19	25	Anna Plichta	Poland	47:59.66
20	8	Hanna Solovey	Ukraine	48:03.35
21	24	Lotte Kopecky	Belgium	48:09.86
22	23	Christine Majerus	Luxembourg	48:16.17
23	13	Ann-Sophie Duyck	Belgium	48:17.60
24	19	Audrey Cordon	France	49:32.87
25	21	Vita Heine	Norway	50:23.39
