= Cycling at the 2016 Summer Olympics – Men's road time trial =

Coordinates: 23°1′49.70″S 43°28′25.21″W

Men's road time trial at the Games of the XXXI Olympiad
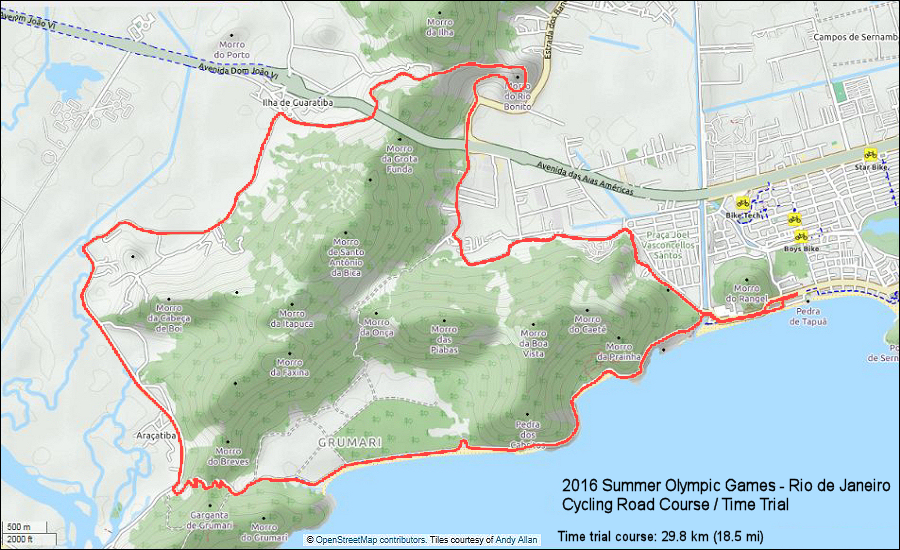
- Grumari Circuit - Pontal
- Venue: Pontal, Rio de Janeiro; 54.5 km (33.9 mi)
- Date: 10 August 2016
- Competitors: 40 from 30 nations
- Winning time: 1:12:15.42

Medalists
1st place, gold medalist(s)		Fabian Cancellara	Switzerland
2nd place, silver medalist(s)		Tom Dumoulin	Netherlands
3rd place, bronze medalist(s)		Chris Froome	Great Britain

The men's individual time trial was one of 18 cycling events of the 2016 Summer Olympics. The event started and finished on 10 August at Pontal, a small peninsula and beach area in the Recreio dos Bandeirantes neighborhood, located in the West Zone of Rio de Janeiro, Brazil. The race start and finish were part of the Barra venues cluster and one of seven temporary venues of the 2016 Summer Olympics.

== Pre-race favourites ==
Dutchman Tom Dumoulin was seen as the favorite for the gold medal. Other athletes considered to be contenders for the gold were Switzerland's Fabian Cancellara, Australia's Rohan Dennis, Great Britain's Chris Froome, Spain's Ion Izagirre, reigning world time trial champion Vasil Kiryienka of Belarus, Germany's Tony Martin and Portugal's Nelson Oliveira.

== Course ==
The men's course was two laps of the 29.8 km (18.5 mi) Grumari circuit for a race distance of 54.5 km (33.9 mi). The race start and finish of the course was at the Tim Maia Square (Estrada do Pontal), then entering the Grumari circuit (clockwise) to reach the first climb (Grumari climb) after 9.7 km (6.0 mi) and the second climb (Grota Funda climb) at 19.2 km (11.9 mi).

== Start list and results ==
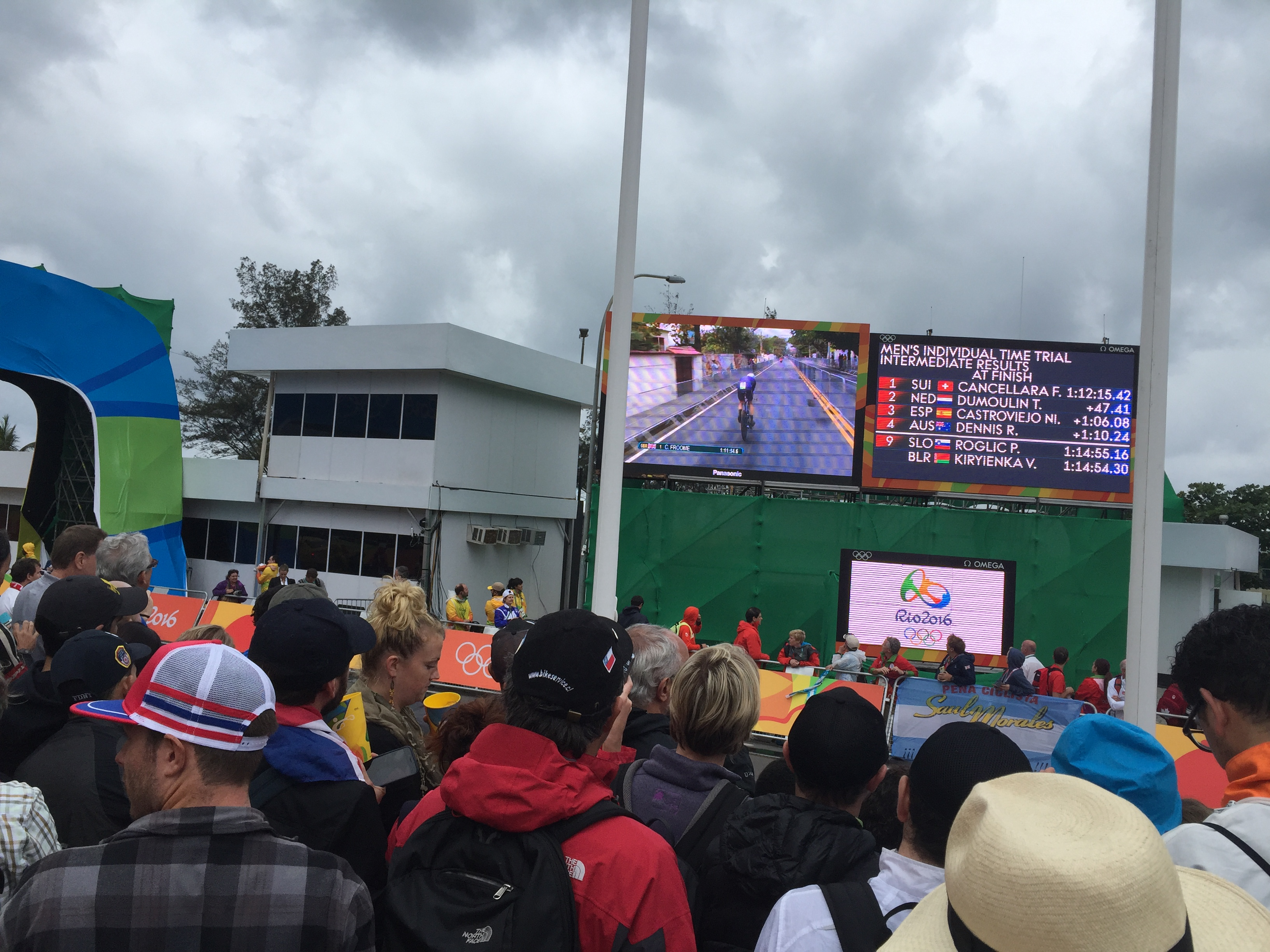
At the finish during the event

Richie Porte of Australia, Vincenzo Nibali of Italy and Wout Poels of the Netherlands were due to participate, but had to withdraw due to injuries as a result of their crashes in the men's road race. Algeria, Colombia, New Zealand and Venezuela also forfeited places for which they had qualified. Dan Craven of Namibia, and Geraint Thomas of Great Britain were invited to fill two of the vacancies in the field.

Pos.	Rider	Country	No.	Time
1st place, gold medalist(s)	Fabian Cancellara	Switzerland	5	1:12:15.42
2nd place, silver medalist(s)	Tom Dumoulin	Netherlands	2	1:13:02.83
3rd place, bronze medalist(s)	Chris Froome	Great Britain	1	1:13:17.54
4	Jonathan Castroviejo	Spain	13	1:13:21.50
5	Rohan Dennis	Australia	8	1:13:25.66
6	Maciej Bodnar	Poland	11	1:14:05.89
7	Nelson Oliveira	Portugal	9	1:14:15.27
8	Ion Izagirre	Spain	7	1:14:21.59
9	Geraint Thomas	Great Britain	16	1:14:52.85
10	Primož Roglič	Slovenia	14	1:14:55.16
11	Leopold König	Czech Republic	21	1:15:23.64
12	Tony Martin	Germany	4	1:15:33.75
13	Simon Geschke	Germany	25	1:15:49.88
14	Michał Kwiatkowski	Poland	20	1:15:55.49
15	Jan Bárta	Czech Republic	10	1:15:56.91
16	Georg Preidler	Austria	28	1:16:02.36
17	Vasil Kiryienka	Belarus	3	1:16:05.70
18	Andriy Grivko	Ukraine	26	1:16:33.24
19	Christopher Juul-Jensen	Denmark	29	1:16:49.62
20	Tim Wellens	Belgium	19	1:16:49.71
21	Hugo Houle	Canada	17	1:17:02.04
22	Taylor Phinney	United States	6	1:17:25.31
23	Brent Bookwalter	United States	24	1:17:57.61
24	Andrey Zeits	Kazakhstan	23	1:18:47.63
25	Kanstantsin Sivtsov	Belarus	12	1:18:58.75
26	Eduardo Sepúlveda	Argentina	30	1:19:07.84
27	Damiano Caruso	Italy	22	1:19:46.53
28	Pavel Kochetkov	Russia	31	1:20:07.59
29	Alexis Vuillermoz	France	27	1:20:43.87
30	Edvald Boasson Hagen	Norway	18	1:21:12.35
31	Ghader Mizbani	Iran	34	1:21:39.45
32	Julian Alaphilippe	France	15	1:24:39.99
33	Mouhssine Lahsaini	Morocco	33	1:25:11.72
34	Ahmet Örken	Turkey	35	1:27:37.41
35	Dan Craven	Namibia	37	1:27:47.93
DNS	Jonathan Monsalve	Venezuela	32	—
DNS	Youcef Reguigui	Algeria	36	—
