= Carlos Coloma Nicolás =

Spanish cyclist (born 1981)

Carlos Coloma
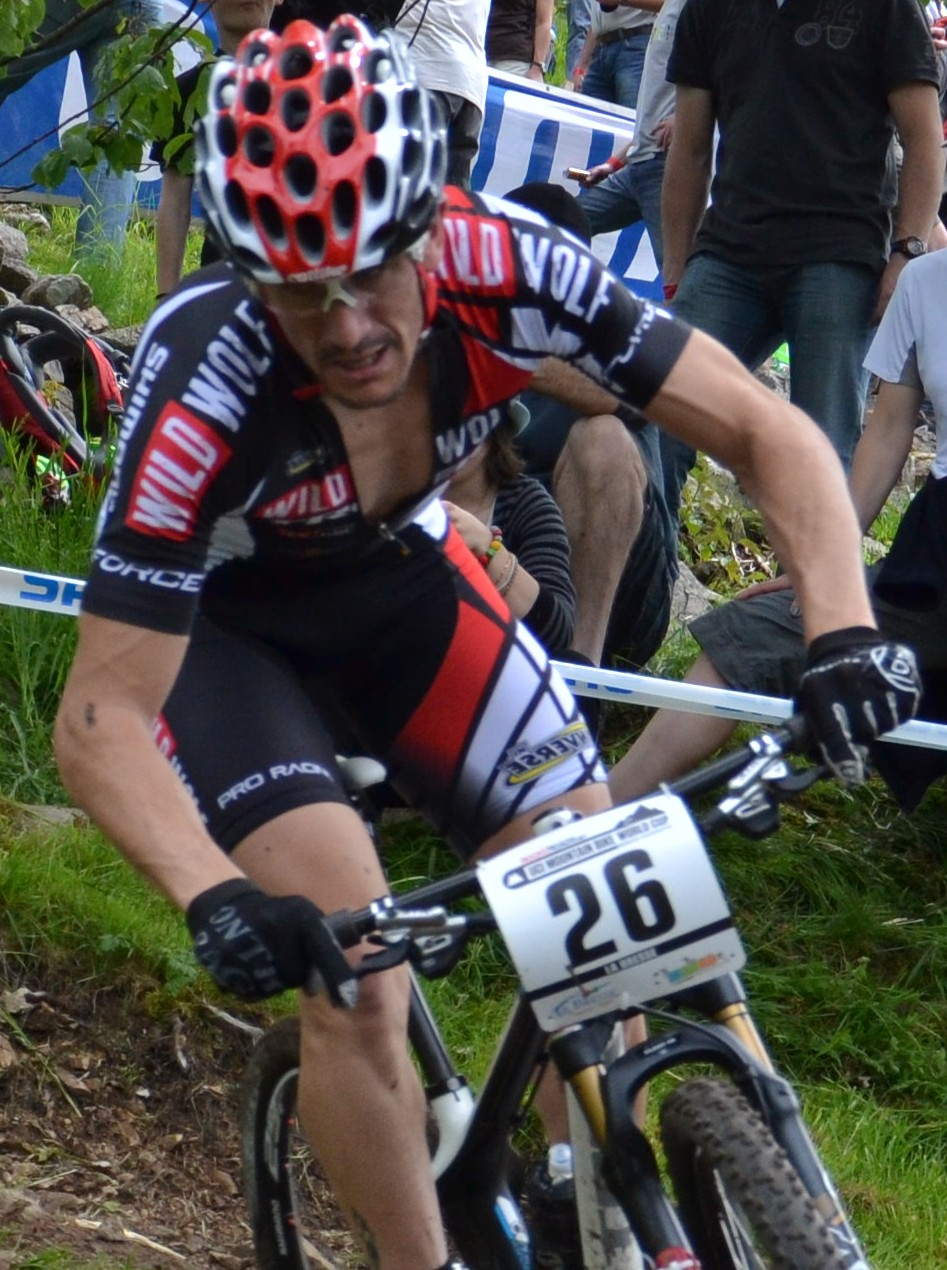

Personal information
- Full name: Carlos Coloma Nicolás
- Born: 28 September 1981 (age 45) Logroño, Spain
- Height: 1.71 m (5 ft 7 1/2 in)
- Weight: 65 kg (143 lb)

Cycling career
- Sport: Cycling
- Current team: BH - TEMPLO CAFÉS TEAM
- Discipline: Mountain bike racing
- Role: Rider
- Rider type: Cross-country
Medal record
Representing Spain
Men's mountain bike racing
Olympic Games
Bronze medal – third place	2016 Rio de Janeiro	Cross-country

Carlos Coloma Nicolás (born 28 September 1981) is a Spanish cross-country mountain biker. At the 2012 Summer Olympics, he competed in the Men's cross-country at Hadleigh Farm, finishing in 6th place. He improved this result four years later at the 2016 Summer Olympics, where he finished third, behind Nino Schurter and Jaroslav Kulhavý, and won the bronze medal. He was on the start list for the 2018 Cross-country European Championship and he finished.

== Olympic results ==
Olympic Games	Discipline	Place
(China) 2008 Beijing	Men's cross-country	28
(United Kingdom) 2012 London	Men's cross-country	6
(Brazil) 2016 Rio de Janeiro	Men's cross-country	3rd place, bronze medalist(s)

== Achievements ==
2016
3rd place at Olympic Games (Rio de Janeiro, Brazil)
1st place at Spanish Mountain Bike National Championships (Maceda, Spain)

2005
1st place at Spanish Mountain Bike National Championships (Vilaboa, Spain)

2003
2nd place (U23) at European Mountain Bike Championships (Graz, Austria)
3rd place (Mixed relay) at European Mountain Bike Championships (Graz, Austria)

2001
3rd place (Mixed relay) at UCI Mountain Bike World Championships (Vail, United States)

1999
2nd place (Junior) at UCI Mountain Bike World Championships (Åre, Sweden)
1st place (Mixed relay) at UCI Mountain Bike World Championships (Åre, Sweden)
