= National Equestrian Center =

Sports venue in Rio de Janeiro, Brazil

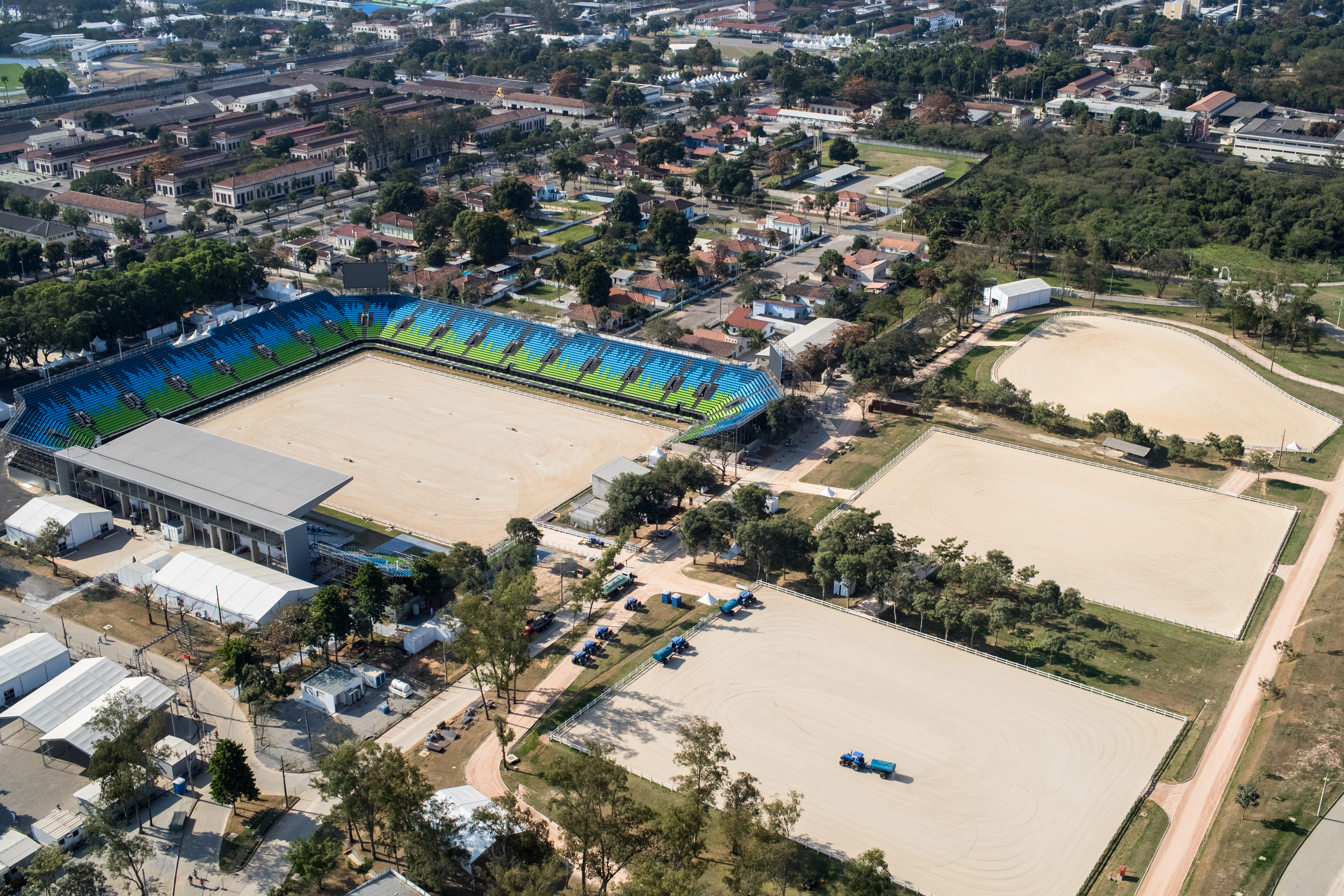
- Interactive map of National Equestrian Center
- Location: Rio de Janeiro, Brazil
- Coordinates: 22°52′10″S 43°24′21″W
- Capacity: 14,000

Construction
- Groundbreaking: 2007
- Opened: 2007
- Renovated: 2015
- Cost: $11 million (renovation)

Tenants
- Equestrian events for the 2016 Summer Olympics; Equestrian events for the 2016 Summer Paralympics

The National Equestrian Center, known as the Olympic Equestrian Centre during the 2016 Summer Olympics, is an equestrian venue located at the Deodoro Olympic Park in Rio de Janeiro, Brazil. The venue hosted the equestrian events for the 2016 Summer Olympics, and the equestrian events for the 2016 Summer Paralympics.
