= Cycling at the 2016 Summer Olympics – Men's cross-country =

Men's cross-country cycling at the Games of the XXXI Olympiad
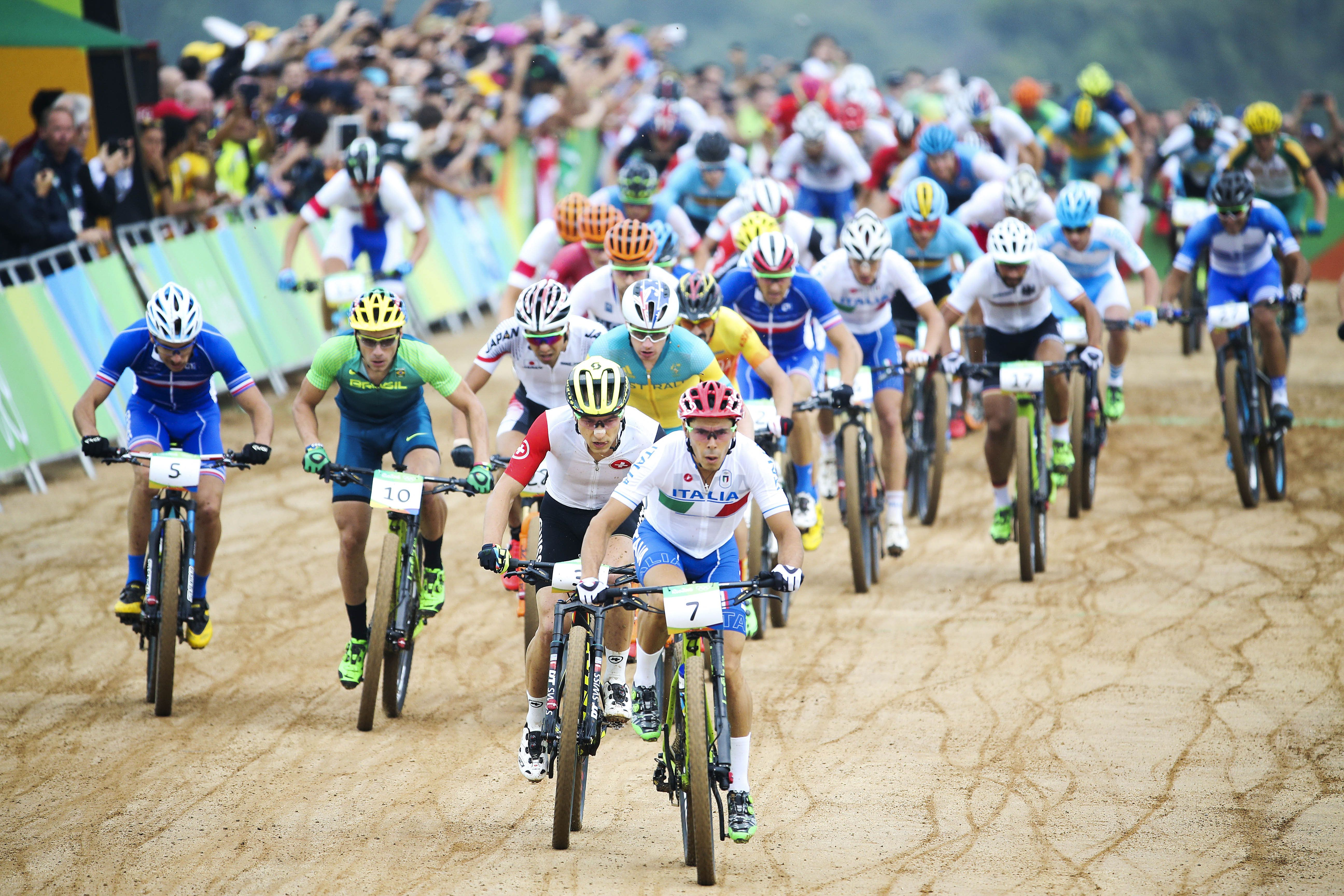
- Marco Aurelio Fontana of Italy leading out the men's cross-country
- Venue: Mountain Bike Centre
- Date: 21 August
- Competitors: 49 from 32 nations
- Winning time: 1h 33' 28"

Medalists
1st place, gold medalist(s)		Nino Schurter	Switzerland
2nd place, silver medalist(s)		Jaroslav Kulhavý	Czech Republic
3rd place, bronze medalist(s)		Carlos Coloma Nicolás	Spain

The men's cross-country cycling event at the 2016 Summer Olympics in Rio de Janeiro took place at the Mountain Bike Centre on 21 August.

The medals were presented by Denis Oswald, IOC member, Switzerland and Brian Cookson, President of the UCI Management Committee.

== Format ==
The competition began at 12:30 pm with a mass-start. The length of the course was 34.52 km (0.57 km + 7 laps of 4.85 km each).

== Schedule ==
All times are Brasília time

Date	Time	Round
Sunday, 21 August 2016	12:30	Final

== Start list and result ==
No.	Rider	Country	UCI rank	Pos.	Time
3	Nino Schurter	Switzerland	2	1st place, gold medalist(s)	1h 33' 28"
1	Jaroslav Kulhavý	Czech Republic	8	2nd place, silver medalist(s)	1h 34' 18"
8	Carlos Coloma Nicolás	Spain	12	3rd place, bronze medalist(s)	1h 34' 51"
4	Maxime Marotte	France	3	4	1h 35' 01"
31	Jhonnatan Botero Villegas	Colombia	51	5	1h 35' 44"
13	Mathias Flückiger	Switzerland	19	6	1h 35' 52"
14	Luca Braidot	Italy	21	7	1h 36' 25"
2	Julien Absalon	France	1	8	1h 36' 43"
6	David Valero	Spain	9	9	1h 37' 00"
5	Victor Koretzky	France	5	10	1h 37' 27"
35	Ruben Scheire	Belgium	60	11	1h 37' 36"
18	Anton Sintsov	Russia	26	12	1h 37' 38"
17	Manuel Fumic	Germany	25	13	1h 37' 39"
15	Ondřej Cink	Czech Republic	22	14	1h 38' 18"
16	José Antonio Hermida	Spain	24	15	1h 38' 21"
11	Daniel McConnell	Australia	17	16	1h 38' 42"
32	Grant Ferguson	Great Britain	52	17	1h 39' 10"
40	Jens Schuermans	Belgium	84	18	1h 39' 30"
37	Andrea Tiberi	Italy	70	19	1h 39' 33"
7	Marco Aurelio Fontana	Italy	10	20	1h 40' 25"
22	Kohei Yamamoto	Japan	32	21	1h 40' 34"
25	Jan Škarnitzl	Czech Republic	36	22	1h 41' 11"
10	Henrique Avancini	Brazil	16	23	1h 41' 18"
34	András Parti	Hungary	58	24	1h 41' 20"
9	Catriel Soto	Argentina	15	25	1h 42' 01"
42	Alan Hatherly	South Africa	95	26	1h 42' 03"
36	Léandre Bouchard	Canada	65	27	1h 42' 43"
38	Moritz Milatz	Germany	72	28	1h 43' 14"
28	Shlomi Haimy	Israel	48	29	1h 43' 30"
39	Rubens Donizete	Brazil	79	30	1h 44' 01"
27	Dimitrios Antoniadis	Greece	41	31	1h 44' 17"
46	Chun Hing Chan	Hong Kong	267	32	1h 44' 41"
41	Andrey Fonseca	Costa Rica	87	33	1h 44' 54"
12	Simon Andreassen	Denmark	18	34	1h 47' 44"
50	Peter Sagan	Slovakia	900	35	LAP
43	Scott Bowden	Australia	101	36	LAP
19	Sam Gaze	New Zealand	27	37	LAP
33	Howard Grotts	United States	55	38	LAP
24	Tiago Ferreira	Portugal	35	39	LAP
30	Raphaël Gagné	Canada	50	40	LAP
45	Nathan Byukusenge	Rwanda	129	41	LAP
26	James Reid	South Africa	40	42	LAP
48	Wang Zhen	China	322	43	LAP
20	David Rosa	Portugal	29	44	LAP
29	Lars Forster	Switzerland	49	DNF	—
21	Alexander Gehbauer	Austria	30	DNF	—
49	Peter Lombard II	Guam	542	DNF	—
23	Rudi van Houts	Netherlands	34	DNF	—
44	Phetetso Monese	Lesotho	112	DNF	—
