= Fort Copacabana =

Military base in Rio de Janeiro, Brazil

- Forte Copacabana
- Rio de Janeiro, Rio de Janeiro in Brazil
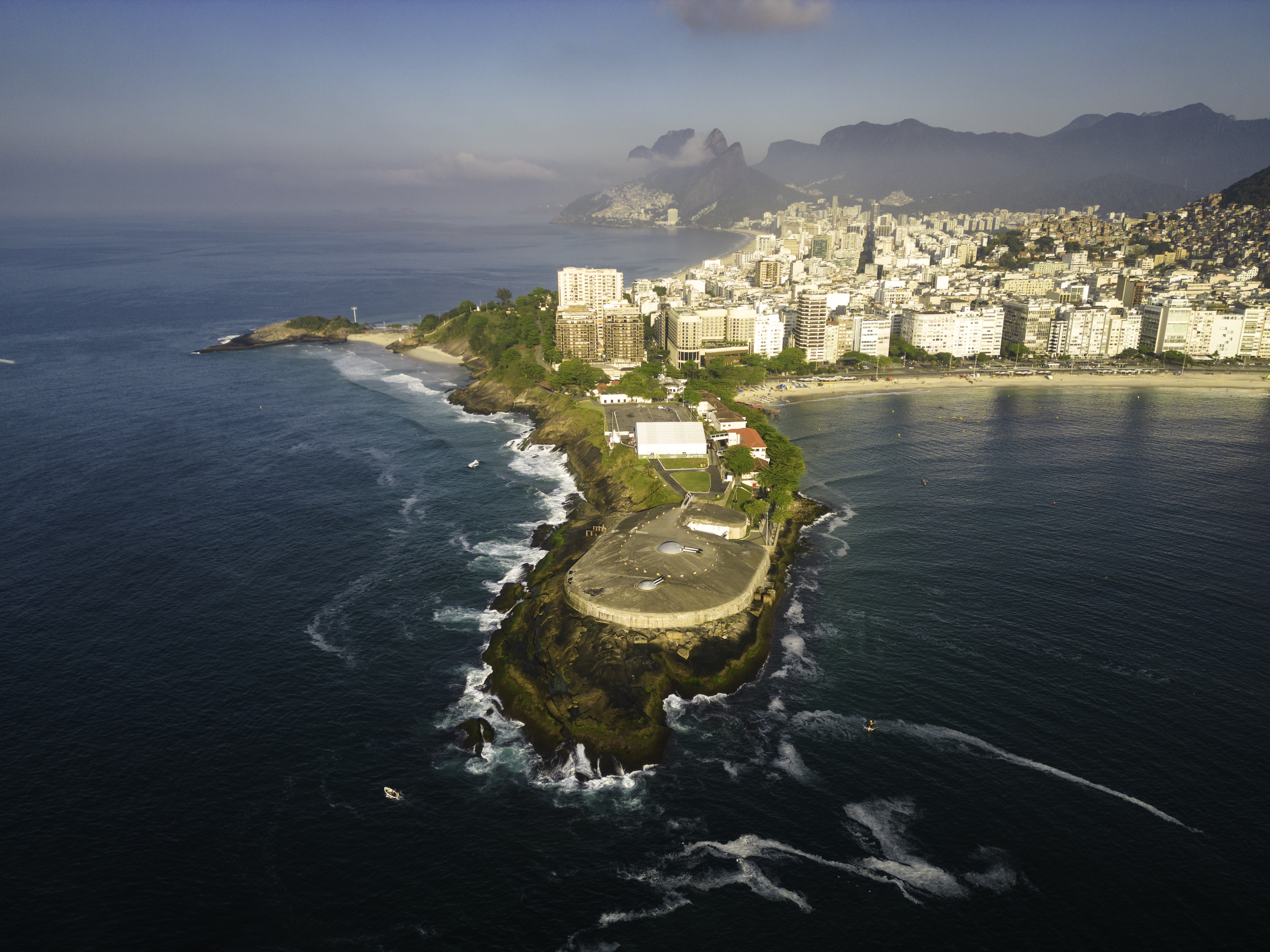
- Aerial view of the fort in 2023

Site information
- Type: Fort
- Open to the public: Yes
- Condition: Good

Location
- Location of Fort Copacabana in Brazil
- Coordinates: 22°59′09″S 43°11′07″W

Site history
- Built: 1908–1914

Fort Copacabana (Portuguese: Forte de Copacabana, IPA: [ˈfɔʁtʃi dʒi ˌkɔpakaˈbɐnɐ]) is a military base at the south end of the beach that defines the district of Copacabana, Rio de Janeiro, Brazil. The base is open to the public and contains the Museu Histórico do Exército (Army Historical Museum) and a coastal defense fort that is the actual Fort Copacabana.

== History ==
The fort is built on a headland that originally contained a small chapel holding a replica of the statue of Our Lady Copacabana, the patron saint of Bolivia. In 1908 the Brazilian army started to build a modern coastal defense fort on the headland to protect both the beach of Copacabana and the entrance to the harbour of Rio de Janeiro. The fort, completed in 1914, consists of two armoured cupolas, one holding a pair of 305 mm (12 in) Krupp cannons, and the other a pair of 190 mm (7 1/2 in) Krupp cannons.

The name of the turret with the 305mm guns is "Duque de Caxias", and the guns are named "Barroso" and "Osório". This cupola is behind and above the one holding the 190 mm guns so that it can fire over them. The 305 mm Krupp guns could fire a shell of some 445 kg (981 lb) up to a distance of 23 km (14 mi). The cupola with the 190 mm guns is named "André Vidal". These guns could fire from 200 m (220 yd) to 18.2 km (11.3 mi). (Note: Luís Alves de Lima e Silva, Duque de Caxias was a Brazilian army marshal and politician, and one of the founders of the Brazilian army in the early 19th century. Francisco Manuel Barroso da Silva was an early Brazilian admiral. Manuel Luís Osório was a Brazilian military and political figure from Rio. André Vidal de Negreiros was a governor of the Portuguese colony of Brazil in the 17th century.)

The fort also has two small retractable casements on the flanks, each holding a 75 mm (3 in) quick-firing gun with a 180° traverse and a range of 7 km (4.3 mi). Unlike the large Krupp guns, these 75 mm guns are no longer in place. The north casement is named "Antônio João" and the south casement is named "Ricardo Franco". (Note: Antônio João Ribeiro was a cavalry lieutenant who distinguished himself in the Paraguayan War. Ricardo Franco de Almeida Serra was a Portuguese soldier who was important in the early 19th century in Brazil and who is credited with being a founder of the Brazilian army's engineers.)

On 5 July 1922, the fort was the centre point of the 18 of the Copacabana Fort revolt. It was the first revolt of the tenentista movement, in the context of the Brazilian Old Republic. The rebellious officers turned the fort's guns on Rio de Janeiro. To suppress the revolt, the government brought the battleships São Paulo and Minas Geraes. On 6 July São Paulo bombarded the fort, firing five salvos and obtaining at least two hits; the fort surrendered half an hour later. Minas Geraes did not fire.

Brazil disbanded its coastal defense artillery branch in 1987. At that time the military deactivated the fort, at least as far as its role as a coastal artillery post was concerned. Except for the cupola at the fort on San Paolo Island outside the harbour of Taranto, the cupolas of Copacabana fort, together with other cupolas at nearby Fort Lage (Fort of Laje: 2 × 240 mm, 2 × 150 mm, and 2 × 2 × 75 mm) and Fort Imbui (Fort D. Pedro II do Imbuí: 2 × 280 mm L/40 and 2 × 2 × 75 mm L/25 Krupp guns), are the only remaining heavy fortress cupolas of the Krupp design in the world.

== Museum and artillery park ==
The museum has several exhibits focusing on different periods and events in the history of the army in Brazil. The Brazilian Expeditionary Force's participation in the Italian campaign in World War II gets only limited treatment, and Brazil's involvement in World War I receives no treatment.

Outside the museum there are several artillery pieces from the late 19th and early 20th centuries. For instance, one field piece is a 5-barrel quick-firing gun, each barrel being of 37 mm (1 1/2 in). Brazil purchased this Hotchkiss revolving cannon in 1876. Another field piece is a British-made Vickers-Armstrong Mark XIX 6-inch (152.4 mm) gun, made in 1918. Brazil purchased this piece in 1940 for use in coastal defense. There are also three 75 mm (3 in) Schneider M1919 mountain guns.

== 2016 Summer Olympics ==
For the 2016 Summer Olympics, the fort hosted the cycling road race (start and finish), marathon swimming and triathlon events.

== Gallery ==
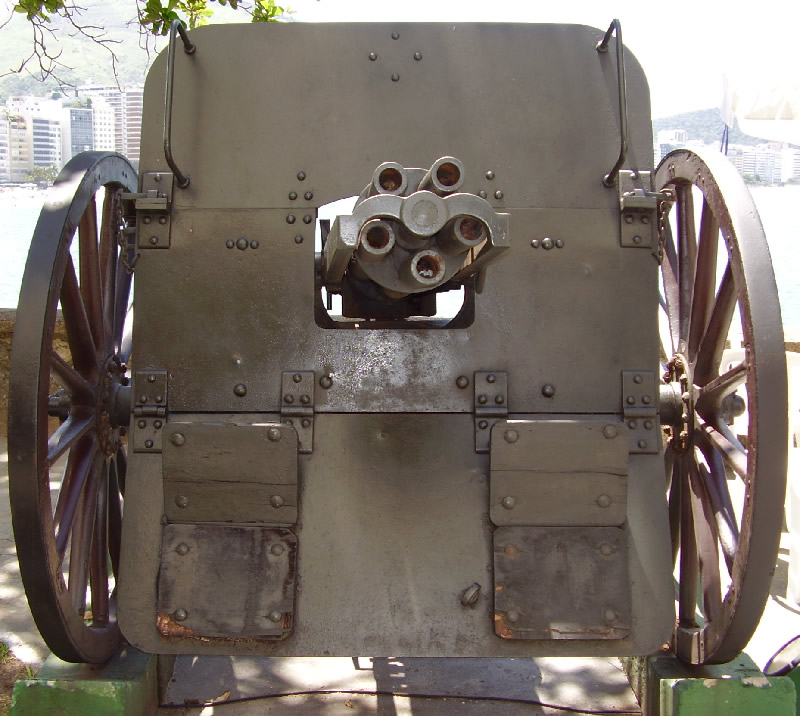
Hotchkiss 5-barrel revolving cannon, Fort Copacabana

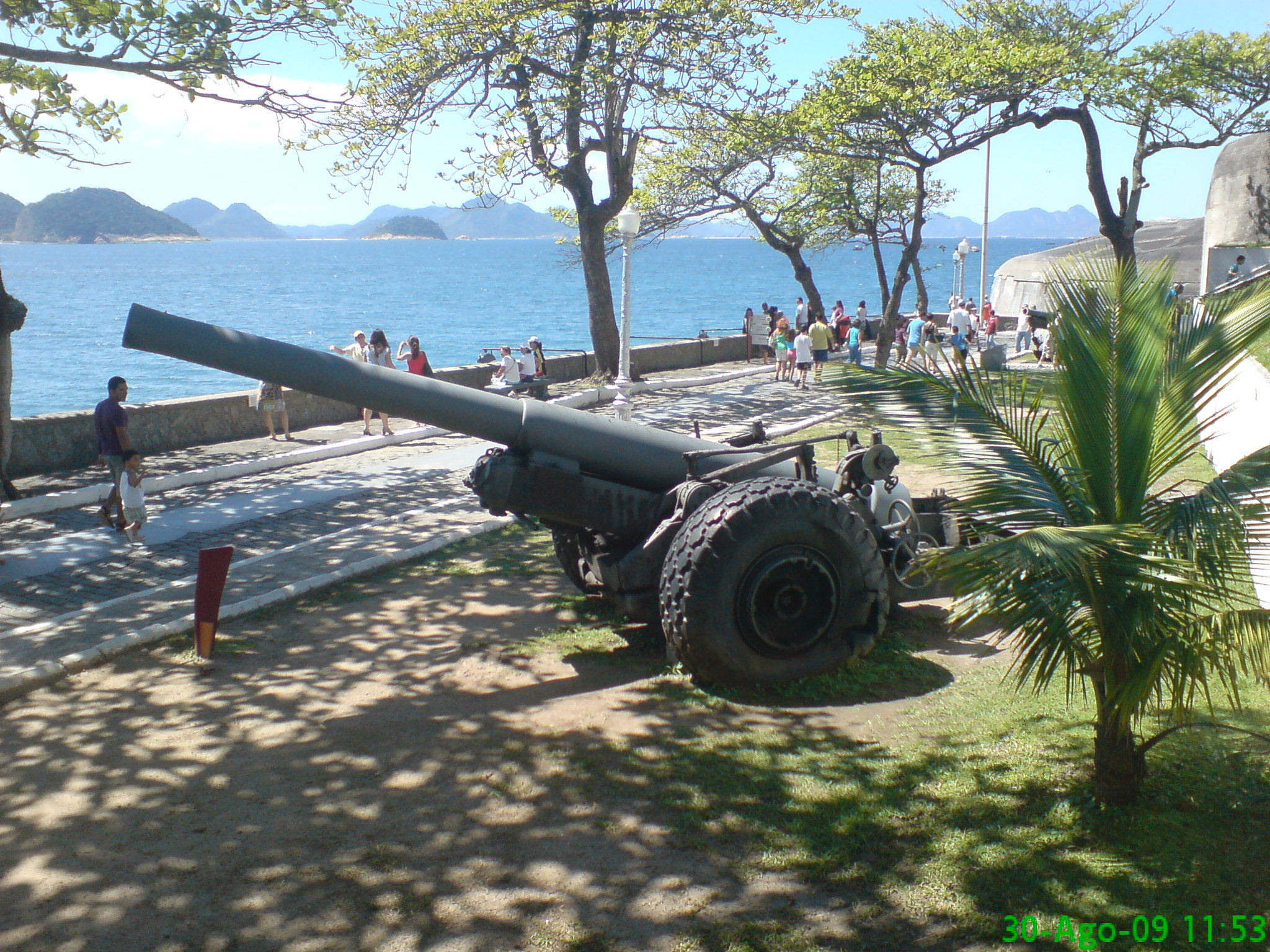
Vickers-Armstrong Mark XIX 6″ gun on display at Fort Copacabana

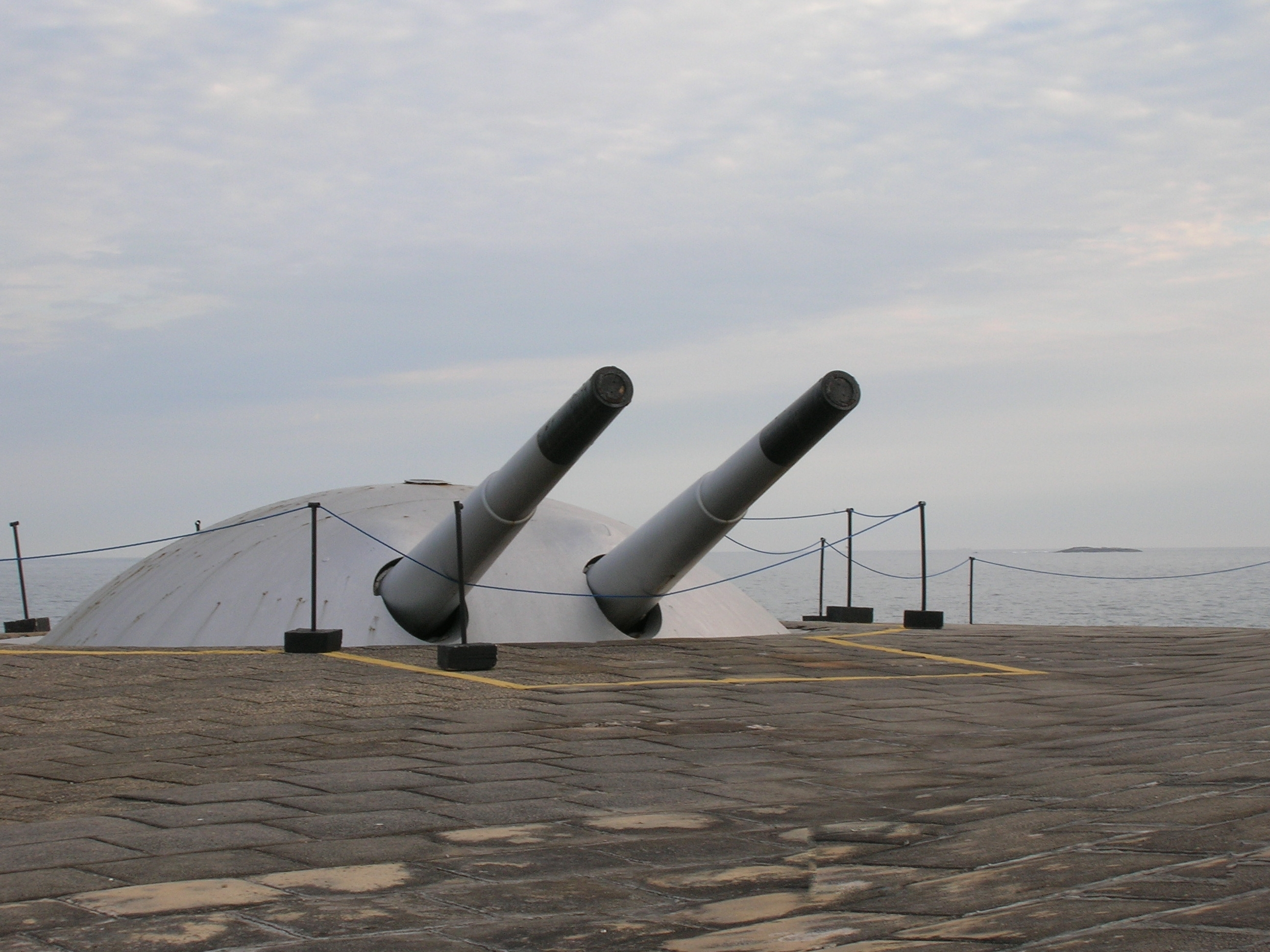
Turret with two 190 mm guns at Fort Copacabana

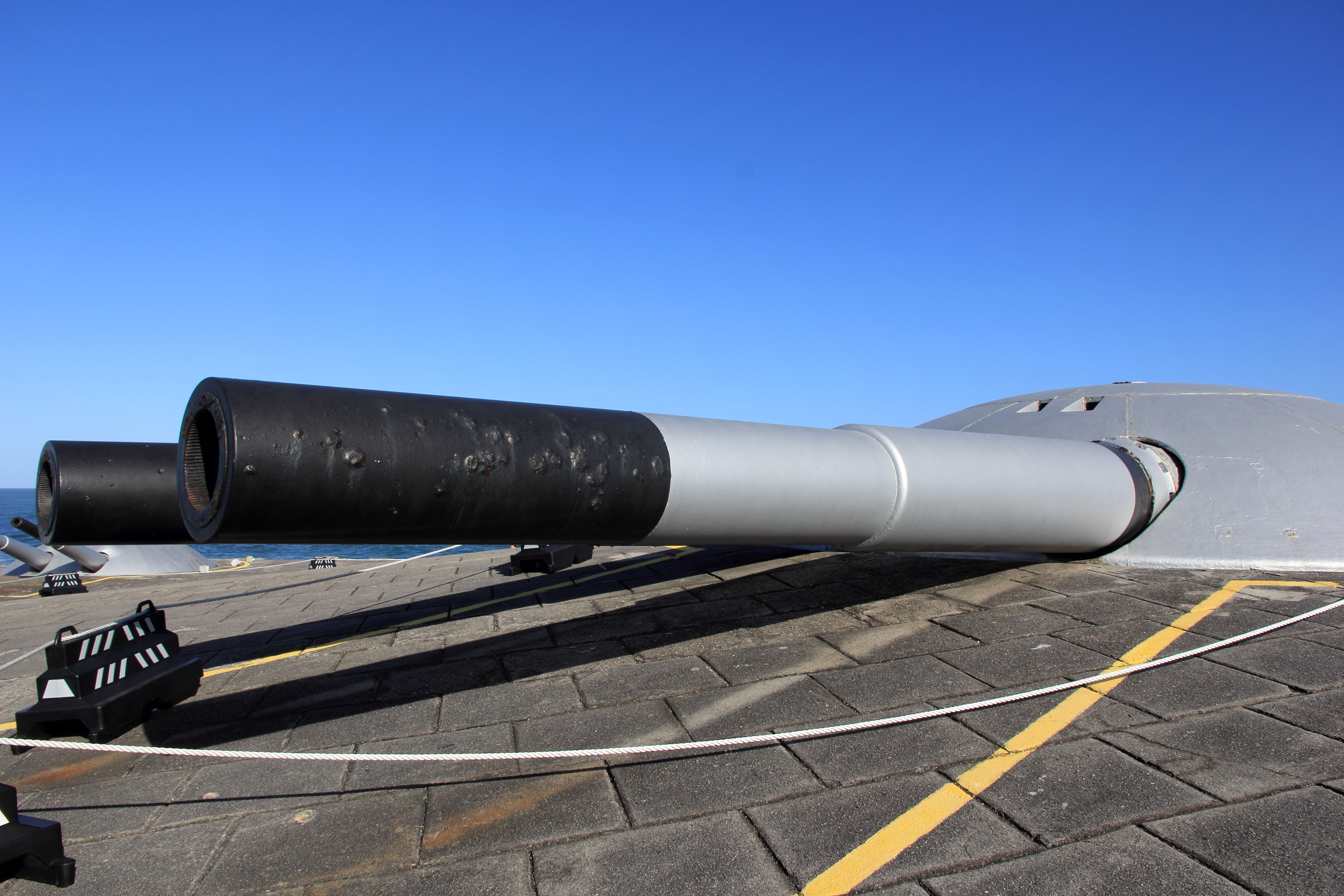
Turret with two 305 mm guns at Fort Copacabana
