= Pontal (Rio de Janeiro) =

Beach in Rio de Janeiro, Brazil

Coordinates: 23°1′49.70″S 43°28′25.21″W

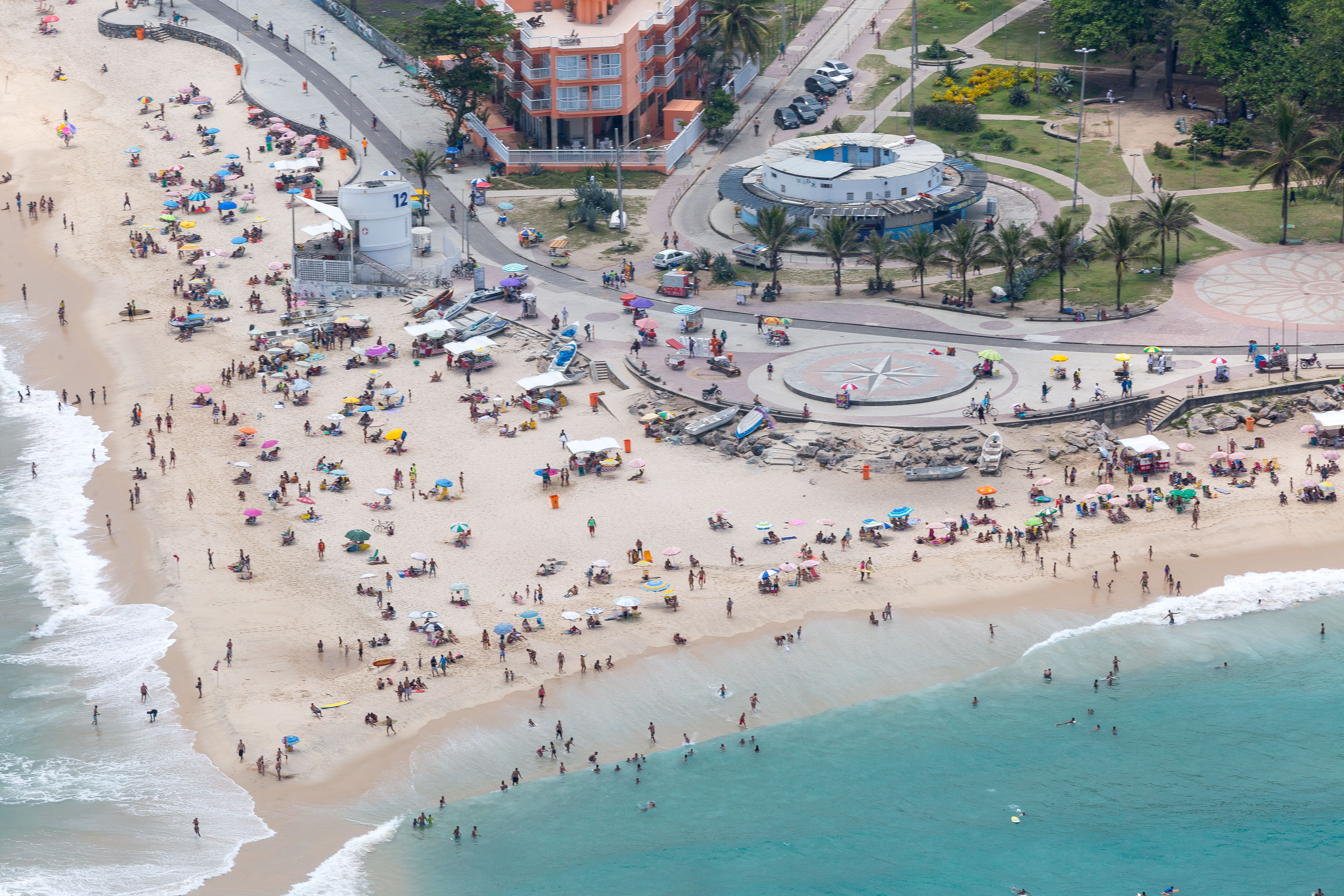
Recreio dos Bandeirantes

Pontal is a small peninsula and beach area in the Recreio dos Bandeirantes (or simply Recreio) neighborhood, located in the West Zone of Rio de Janeiro, Brazil and was a temporary venue in the Barra Olympic venues cluster for the Athletics (race walk) and Cycling (time trial) competitions of the 2016 Summer Olympics.

== 2016 Summer Olympics ==
The men's and women's Olympic cycling time trials were held August 10, 2016 on the 29.8 km (18.5 mi) Grumari circuit. The race start of the course was set to be at the Tim Maia Square (Estrada do Pontal), then entered the Grumari circuit (clockwise) to reach the first climb (Grumari climb) after 9.7 km and the second climb (Grota Funda climb) at 19.2 km, before finishing back in Pontal at the Av Lucio Costa.

- Men's cycling - time trial: 54.5 km (33.86 mi) (2 laps)
- Women's cycling - time trial: 29.8 km (18.5 mi) (1 lap)

The 24.8 km (15.4 mi) circuit will also feature in the men's and women's road race:

- Men’s Road Race: 4 laps (99.2 km of 241.5 km)
- Women’s Road Race: 2 laps (49.6 km of 141 km)

The course of the Olympic race walk for the men's 50 km, 20 km and the women's 20 km started and finished near the Av Lucio Costa round-about. The 20 km competitions were held on a 1 km circuit course (clockwise) along Av. Lucio Costa and Estr. do Pontal between the intersections of R. Projectada (west) and R. Helio de Brito (east). The 50 km course followed the same layout but was extended to 2 km to the intersection of Estr. do Pontal and Rua Geraldo Irineo Joffily (west).

- Men's 50 km race walk: 25 laps (2 km circuit)
- Men's / Women's 20 km race walk: 20 laps (1 km circuit)

== 2016 Olympic cycling maps ==
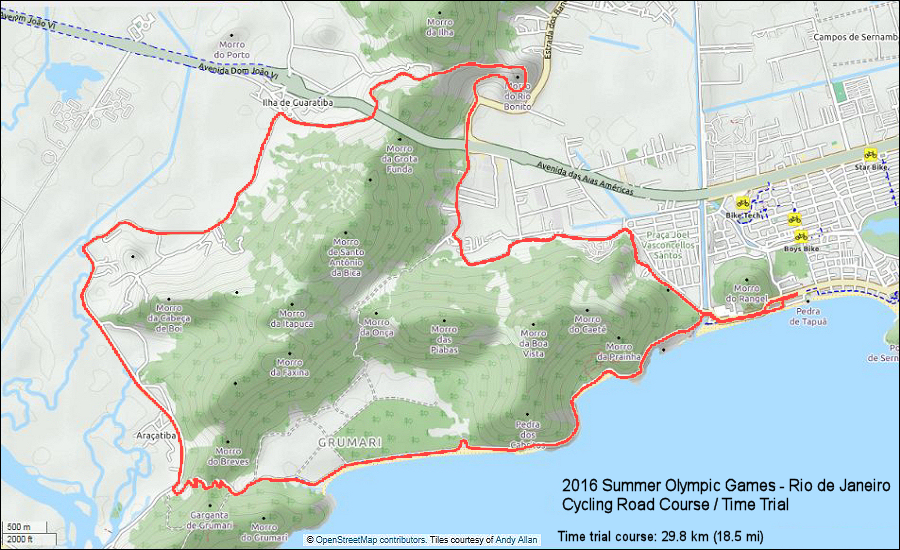
2016 Olympic Cycling - Grumari Circuit

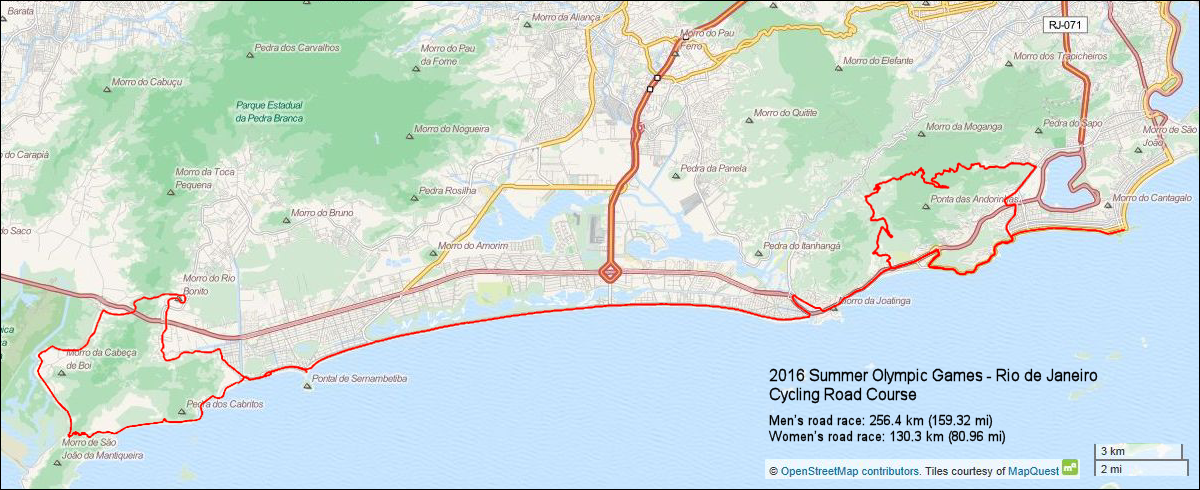
2016 Olympic Cycling - Road Course

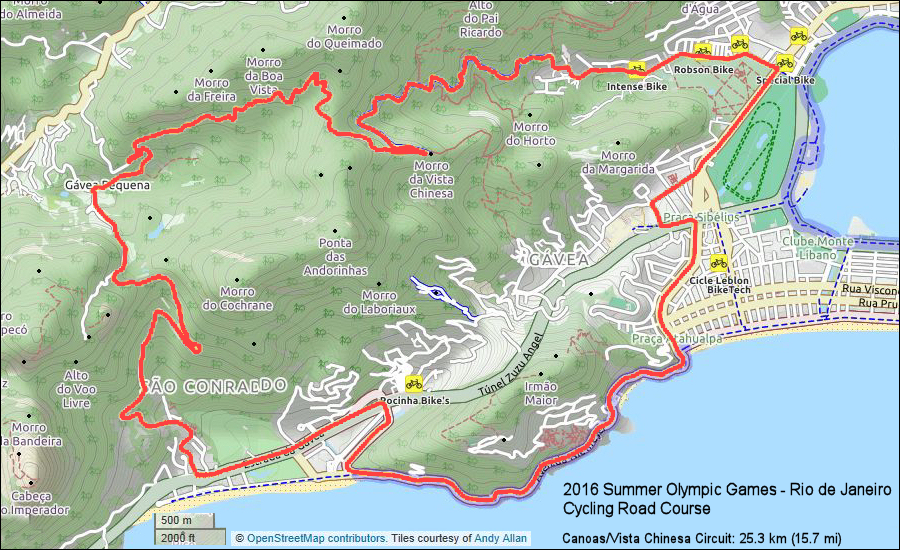
2016 Olympic Cycling - Vista Chinesa Circuit
