= Cycling at the 2016 Summer Olympics – Women's team sprint =

Cycling event at the 2016 Summer Olympics

Women's team sprint cycling at the Games of the XXXI Olympiad
- Venue: Rio Olympic Velodrome
- Date: 12 August
- Competitors: 18 from 9 nations
- Winning time: 32.107

Medalists
1st place, gold medalist(s)		Gong Jinjie; Zhong Tianshi	China
2nd place, silver medalist(s)		Daria Shmeleva; Anastasia Voynova	Russia
3rd place, bronze medalist(s)		Kristina Vogel; Miriam Welte	Germany

The women's cycling team sprint at the 2016 Olympic Games in Rio de Janeiro took place on 12 August 2016.

The event was won by the Chinese pairing of Gong Jinjie and Zhong Tianshi over the Russian pairing of Daria Shmeleva and Anastasia Voynova. The defending champions, Germans Kristina Vogel and Miriam Welte, won the bronze medal.

The medals were presented by Yang Yang, IOC member, China and Marian Stenina, Member of the UCI Management Committee.

== Competition format ==
The women's team sprint race consists of a two-lap race between two teams of two cyclists, starting on opposite sides of the track. Each member of the team must lead for one of the laps.

== Schedule ==
All times are Brasília Time (UTC-03:00)

Date	Time	Round
Friday 12 August 2016	16:00	Qualifications and final

== Results ==
=== Qualification ===
The fastest 8 teams qualify for the first round.

Rank	Country	Cyclists	Result	Notes
1	China	Gong Jinjie; Zhong Tianshi	32.305	Q, OR
2	Russia	Daria Shmeleva; Anastasia Voynova	32.655	Q
3	Germany	Kristina Vogel; Miriam Welte	32.673	Q
4	Australia	Anna Meares; Stephanie Morton	32.881	Q
5	Netherlands	Laurine van Riessen; Elis Ligtlee	33.189	Q
6	France	Sandie Clair; Virginie Cueff	33.625	Q
7	Canada	Kate O'Brien; Monique Sullivan	33.735	Q
8	Spain	Tania Calvo; Helena Casas	33.891	Q
9	New Zealand	Natasha Hansen; Olivia Podmore	34.346	

- Q = qualified

=== First round ===
First round heats are held as follows:
Heat 1: 4th v 5th qualifier
Heat 2: 3rd v 6th qualifier
Heat 3: 2nd v 7th qualifier
Heat 4: 1st v 8th qualifier

The heat winners are ranked on time, from which the top 2 proceed to the gold medal final and the other 2 proceed to the bronze medal final.

Rank	Heat	Country	Cyclists	Result	Notes
1	4	China	Gong Jinjie; Zhong Tianshi	31.928	QG, WR, OR
2	3	Russia	Daria Shmeleva; Anastasia Voynova	32.324	QG
3	1	Australia	Anna Meares; Stephanie Morton	32.636	QB
4	2	Germany	Kristina Vogel; Miriam Welte	32.806	QB
5	1	Netherlands	Laurine van Riessen; Elis Ligtlee	32.792	
6	2	France	Sandie Clair; Virginie Cueff	33.517	
7	4	Spain	Tania Calvo; Helena Casas	33.531	
8	3	Canada	Kate O'Brien; Monique Sullivan	33.684	

- QG = qualified for gold medal final
- QB = qualified for bronze medal final

=== Finals ===
The final classification is determined in the medal finals.

Rank	Country	Cyclists	Result	Notes
Bronze medal final
3rd place, bronze medalist(s)	Germany	Kristina Vogel; Miriam Welte	32.636	
4	Australia	Anna Meares; Stephanie Morton	32.658	
Gold medal final
1st place, gold medalist(s)	China	Gong Jinjie; Zhong Tianshi	32.107	
2nd place, silver medalist(s)	Russia	Daria Shmeleva; Anastasia Voynova	32.401	
