= Mountain Bike Centre =

Recreational attraction in Brazil

Coordinates: 22°51′30″S 43°24′45″W

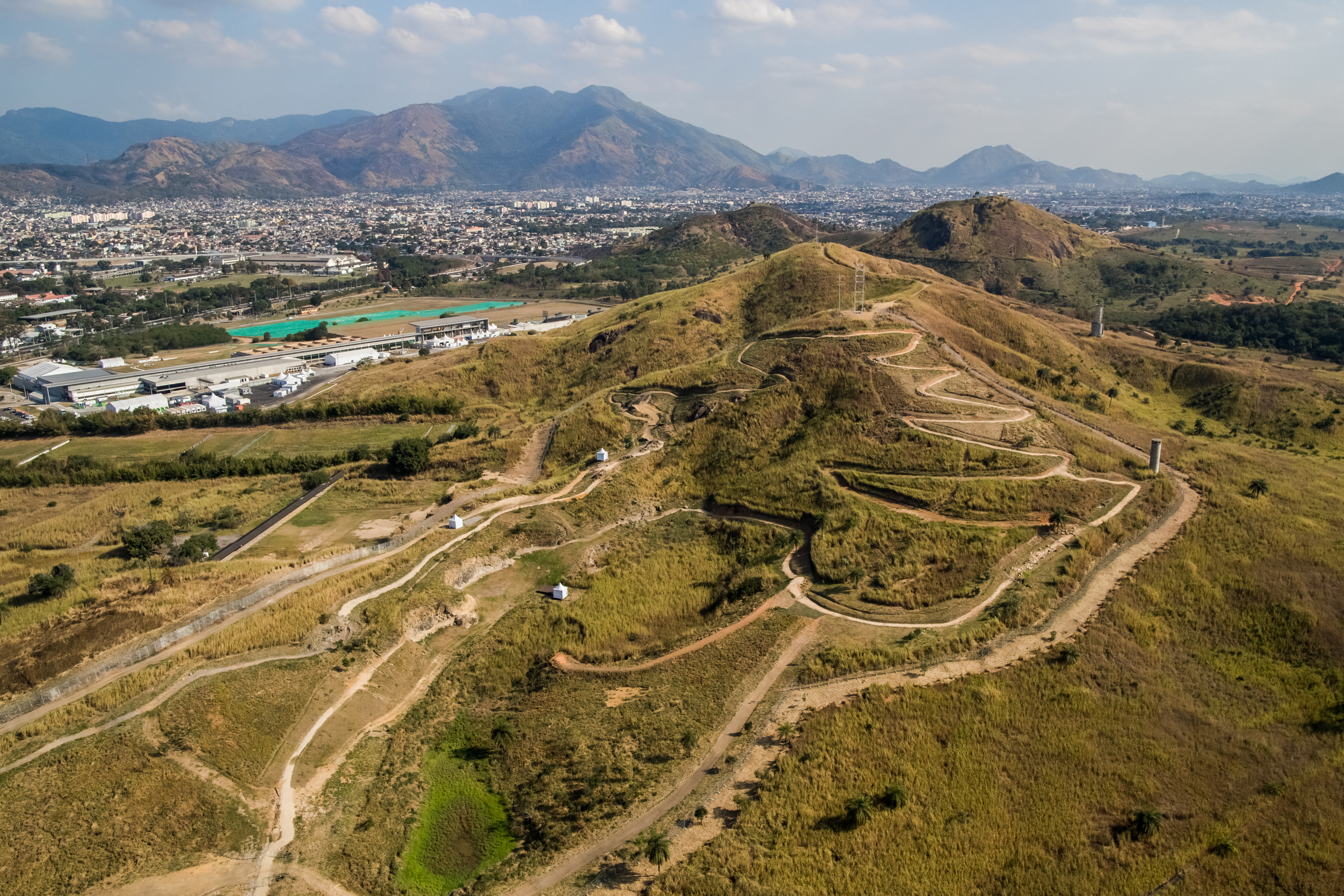
Mountain Bike Centre

The Mountain Bike Centre is a cycling venue in Deodoro Pentathlon Park, located in the Deodoro district of the West Zone in Rio de Janeiro, Brazil.

The facility hosted the mountain biking events for the 2016 Summer Olympics.

== See also ==
- Fort Copacabana — another 2016 Summer Olympic cycling venue.
