= Olympic BMX Centre =

Cycling venue in Rio de Janeiro, Brazil

Coordinates: 22°50′48″S 43°24′4″W

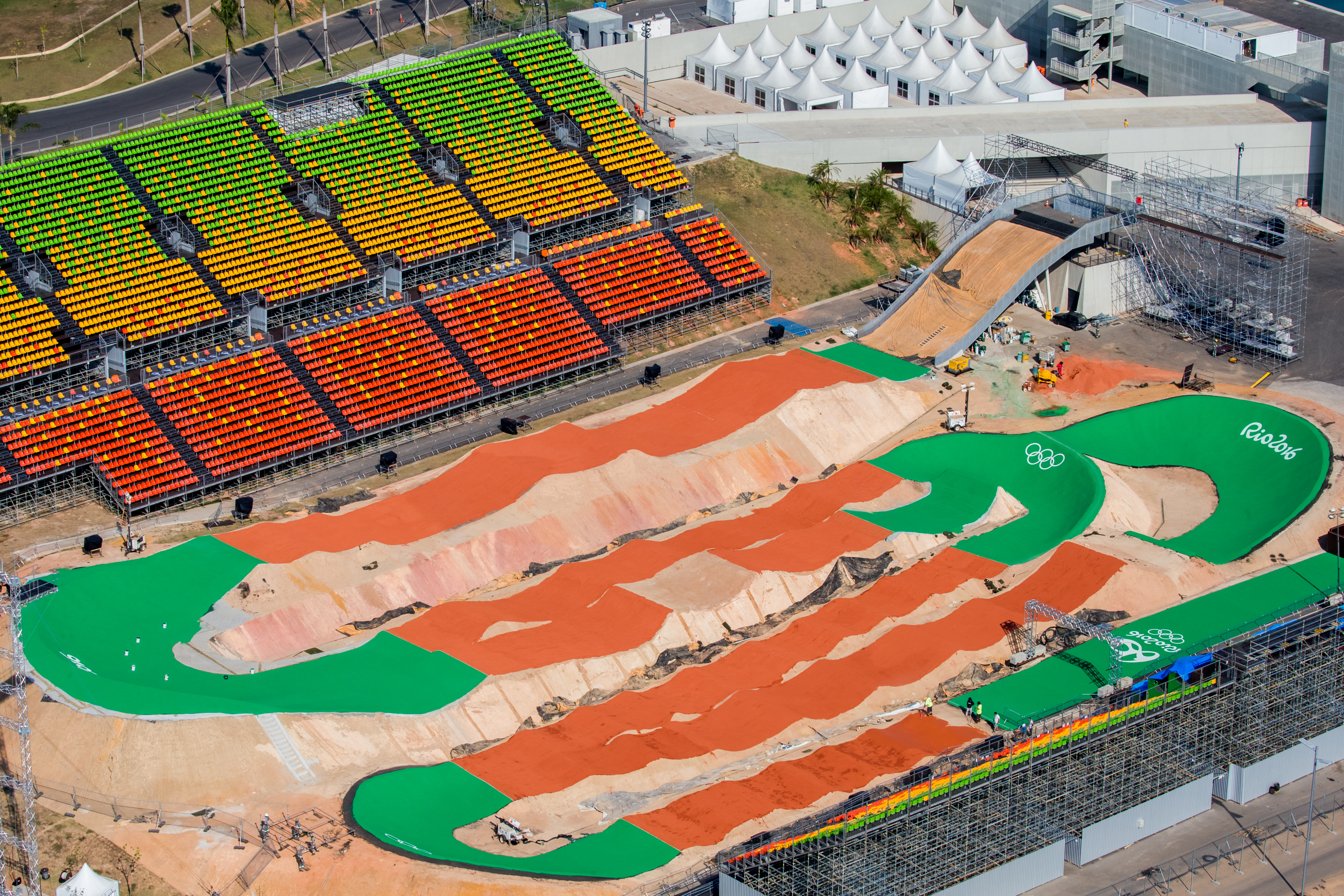
Olympic BMX Center

The Olympic BMX Centre is a cycling venue, constructed for the BMX racing events at the 2016 Summer Olympics in Rio de Janeiro, Brazil.

The surface was supplied by GreenSet.

In 2025, the Centre was reopened for public use after a renovation.
