= Castelão (Fortaleza) =

Football stadium in Fortaleza, Ceará, Brazil

Arena Castelão
- "Gigante da Boa Vista"
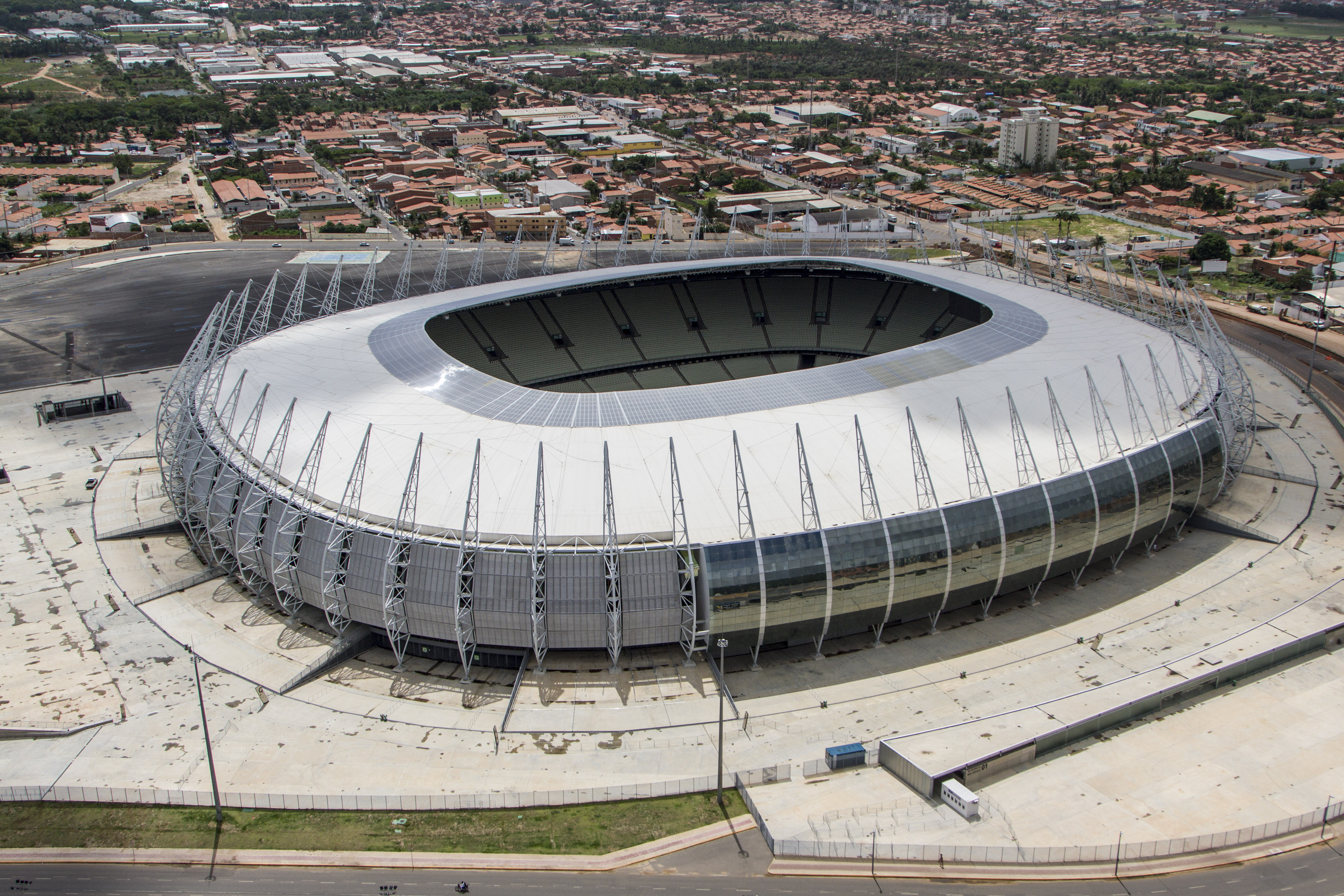
- Sisbrace
- Interactive map of Arena Castelão
- Full name: Estádio Governador Plácido Castelo
- Location: Fortaleza, Ceará, Brazil
- Coordinates: 3°48′26″S 38°31′21″W
- Owner: State of Ceará
- Operator: State of Ceará
- Capacity: 57,867
- Surface: Grass
- Record attendance: 118,496
- Field size: 105 x 68 m

Construction
- Groundbreaking: 1969
- Built: 1969–1973
- Opened: November 11, 1973
- Renovated: 2002 and 2013
- Expanded: 1980
- Architects: José Liberal de Castro; Gehard Ernst Borman; Reginaldo Mendes Rangel; Marcílio Dias de Luna; Ivan da Silva Britto
- Structural engineer: Hugo Alcântara Mota

Tenants
- Fortaleza; Ceará; Brazil national football team (selected matches)

Estádio Governador Plácido Castelo, also known as the Castelão (Portuguese pronunciation: [kasteˈlɐ̃w], Portuguese for "Big Castle") or Gigante da Boa Vista, is a football stadium that was inaugurated on November 11, 1973, in Fortaleza, Ceará, Brazil. With a maximum capacity of 57,867 spectators it is the sixth largest stadium in the country. The stadium is owned by the Ceará state Government, and is the home ground of Ceará Sporting Club and Fortaleza Esporte Clube. Its formal name honors Plácido Aderaldo Castelo (1906–1979), who served as the governor of Ceará from September 12, 1966, to March 15, 1971, and was a leader in getting the stadium built.

== History ==
Castelão was constructed from 1969 to 1973 and was inaugurated on November 11 of that year.

In May 2000, the Ceará state government started to renovate the stadium. The renovations were divided in three stages, and started on May 16, 2001. The first stage consisted in the recovery of the ditches, and of the bleachers junctions, as well as the recovery of the low walls. The second stage of the reformation started on July 20, 2001, and consisted in the recovery and strengthening of the stadium's physical structure. The third stage consisted in the recovery of the electrical, hydraulic, sanitary, and electronic installations.

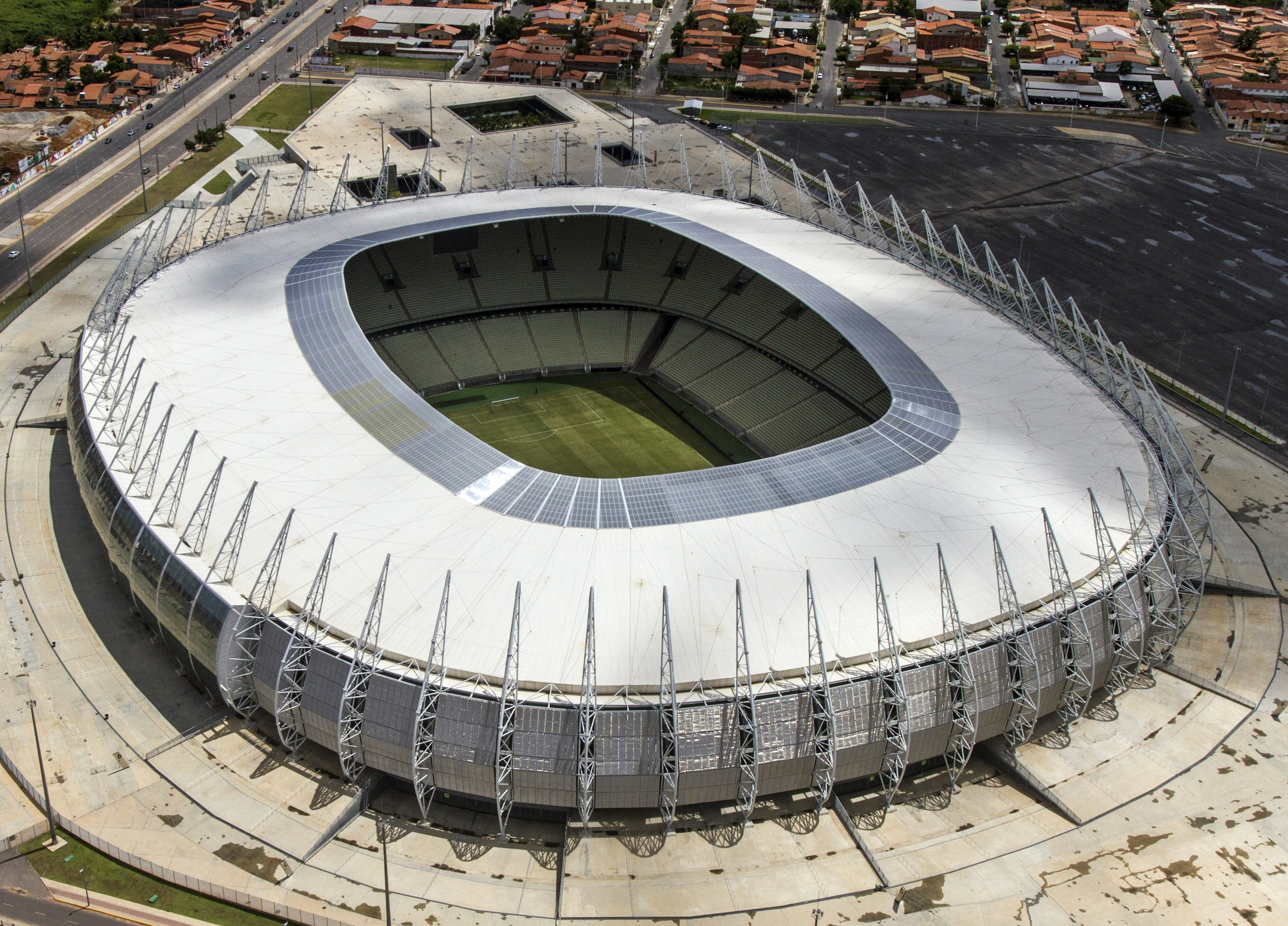
Arena Castelão in 2013

The inaugural match was played on November 11, 1973, when Ceará and Fortaleza drew 0–0. The stadium's first goal was scored on November 18, 1973, by Ceará's Erandy, when Ceará beat Vitória 1–0.

The re-inaugural match was played on March 23, 2002, when the Brazil national team beat the Yugoslavia national team 1–0. The stadium's first goal after the re-inauguration was scored by Brazil's Luizão. The stadium's attendance record currently stands at 118,496, set on August 27, 1980, when the Brazil national team beat the Uruguay national team 1–0.

The stadium was reopened on December 16, 2012, in a ceremony attended by former president Dilma Rousseff and Governor of Ceará, Cid Gomes. There was also a concert from Raimundo Fagner.

== Notable football events ==
=== 2013 FIFA Confederations Cup ===
Estadio Castelão hosted 3 games of the 2013 FIFA Confederations Cup: two group games and one of the semi-finals.

Date	Time (UTC-03)	Team #1	Result	Team #2	Round	Attendance
June 19, 2013	16:00	Brazil	2–0	Mexico	Group A	57,804
June 23, 2013	16:00	Nigeria	0–3	Spain	Group B	51,263
June 27, 2013	16:00	Spain	0–0 (a.e.t.) (pen: 7–6)	Italy	Semi-Final	56,083

=== 2014 FIFA World Cup ===
Castelão was one of the venues of the 2014 FIFA World Cup, which took place in Brazil. The stadium was redeveloped for the tournament; the reconstruction project, led by Uruguayan architect Héctor Vigliecca, involved the addition of a larger roof, the construction of an underground car park with 4,200 spaces, and a new lower tier. After the redevelopment, the stadium now has an all-seater capacity of 63,903. The stadium closed on March 31, 2011, for the reconstruction project, which was officially completed in December 2012. Castelão was the first of 12 stadiums being built or redeveloped for the 2014 World Cup to be completed.

Date	Time (UTC-03)	Team #1	Result	Team #2	Round	Attendance
June 14, 2014	16:00	Uruguay	1–3	Costa Rica	Group D	58,679
June 17, 2014	16:00	Brazil	0–0	Mexico	Group A	60,342
June 21, 2014	16:00	Germany	2–2	Ghana	Group G	59,621
June 24, 2014	17:00	Greece	2–1	Ivory Coast	Group C	59,095
June 29, 2014	13:00	Netherlands	2–1	Mexico	Round of 16	58,817
July 4, 2014	17:00	Brazil	2–1	Colombia	Quarter-finals	60,342

=== 2027 FIFA Women's World Cup ===
Castelão is one of the eight venues scheduled to host matches at the 2027 FIFA Women's World Cup

Date	Time (UTC-03)	Team #1	Result	Team #2	Round	Attendance
26 June 2027	--:--	D1	v	D2	Group D	
28 June 2027	--:--	G1	v	G2	Group G	
2 July 2027	--:--	E1	v	E3	Group E	
4 July 2027	--:--	H1	v	H3	Group H	
6 July 2027	--:--	D3	v	D2	Group D	
8 July 2027	--:--	G3	v	G2	Group G	
10 July 2027	--:--	Winner Group A	v	Runner-up Group B	Round of 16	
13 July 2027	--:--	Winner Group F	v	Runner-up Group E	Round of 16	
17 July 2027	--:--	Winner Match 51	v	Winner Match 52	Quarter-finals	

== Other events ==
On July 9, 1980, the 10th National Eucharistic Congress was opened in Fortaleza. Pope John Paul II participated in the celebrations of the Congress and the Estádio Castelão received the largest public of its history: 120,000 people. On this occasion, during Virgílio Távora's government, the stadium was renovated, and the bleachers of the lower section were finished.

Another religious celebration happened on August 13, 1995. On this occasion, the farewell mass of the archbishop of Fortaleza Dom Aloísio Lorscheider gathered 50 thousand people.

Several artistic shows were made at the stadium.

On December 9, 2007, Castelão hosted the MotoCross Freestyle World Championship . More than 700 tons of sand and metal ramps, almost 6 meters long and 2.7 meters high were used in the event.

== Concerts ==
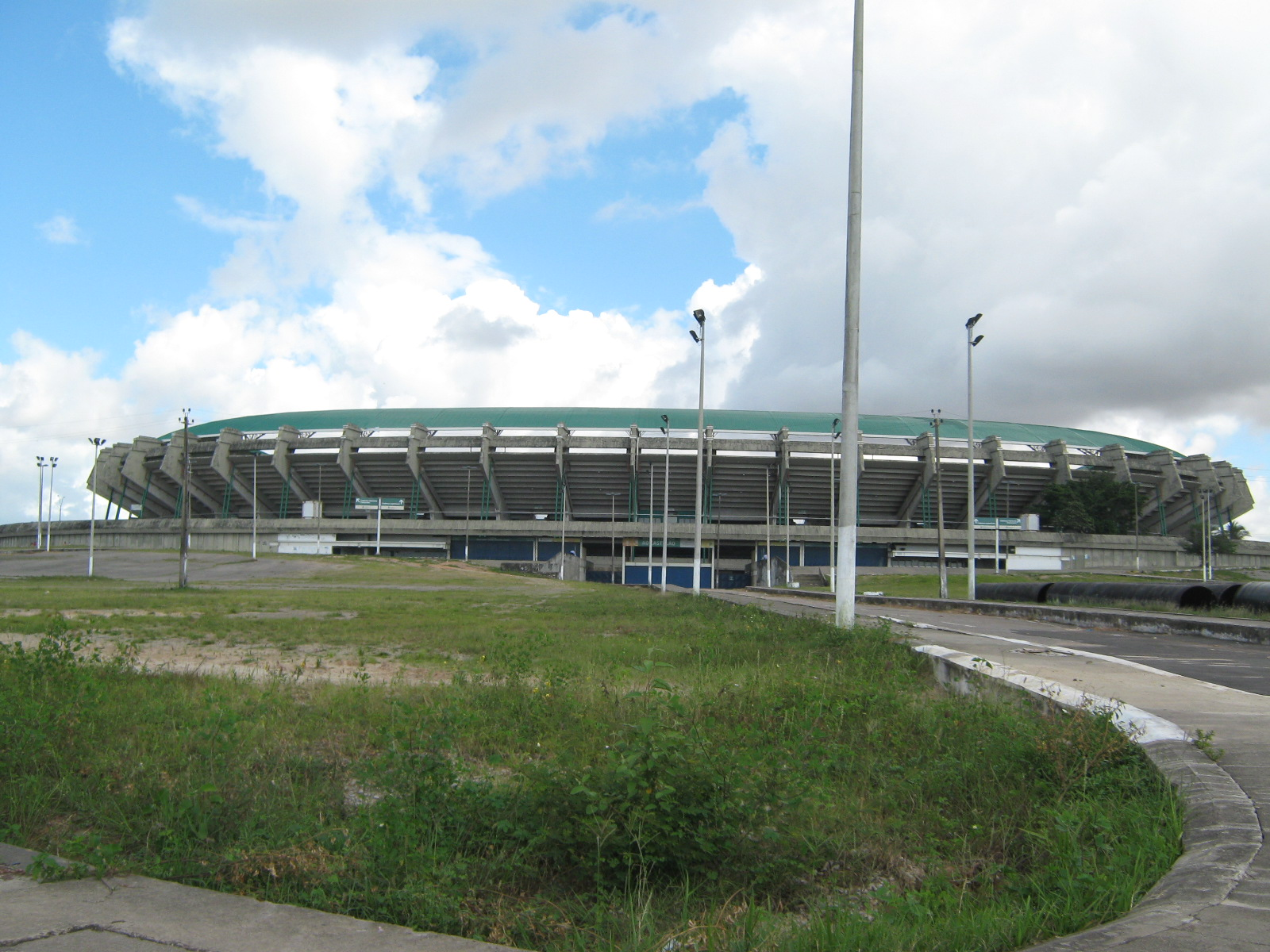
Castelão in 2009

Band/Artist	Tour	Attendance	Year	Date
Menudo	Menudo Live 1985 Tour	70,000	1985	February, 27
Mamonas Assassinas	Mamonas Assassinas Tour	37,000	1995	December, 22
Xuxa	Tô de Bem com a Vida	45,000	1996	December, 10
Paul McCartney	Out There! Tour	48,668	2013	May, 9
Beyoncé	The Mrs. Carter Show World Tour	27,847	2013	September, 8
Elton John	The Diving Board Tour	18,979	2014	February, 23
Roberto Carlos	74th Birthday	45,000	2014	April, 5
Franklin Graham	Festival Of Hope BGEA	38,000	2015	October, 22
Franklin Graham	Festival Of Hope BGEA	45,000	2015	October, 23
Franklin Graham	Festival Of Hope BGEA	50,000	2015	October, 24
Ivete Sangalo	IS20 Tour	45,000	2016	January, 8
Iron Maiden	The Book of Souls World Tour	23,531	2016	March, 24
Caetano Veloso & Maria Bethânia	Caetano & Bethânia		2024	November 16

== Gallery ==
Castelão Stadium

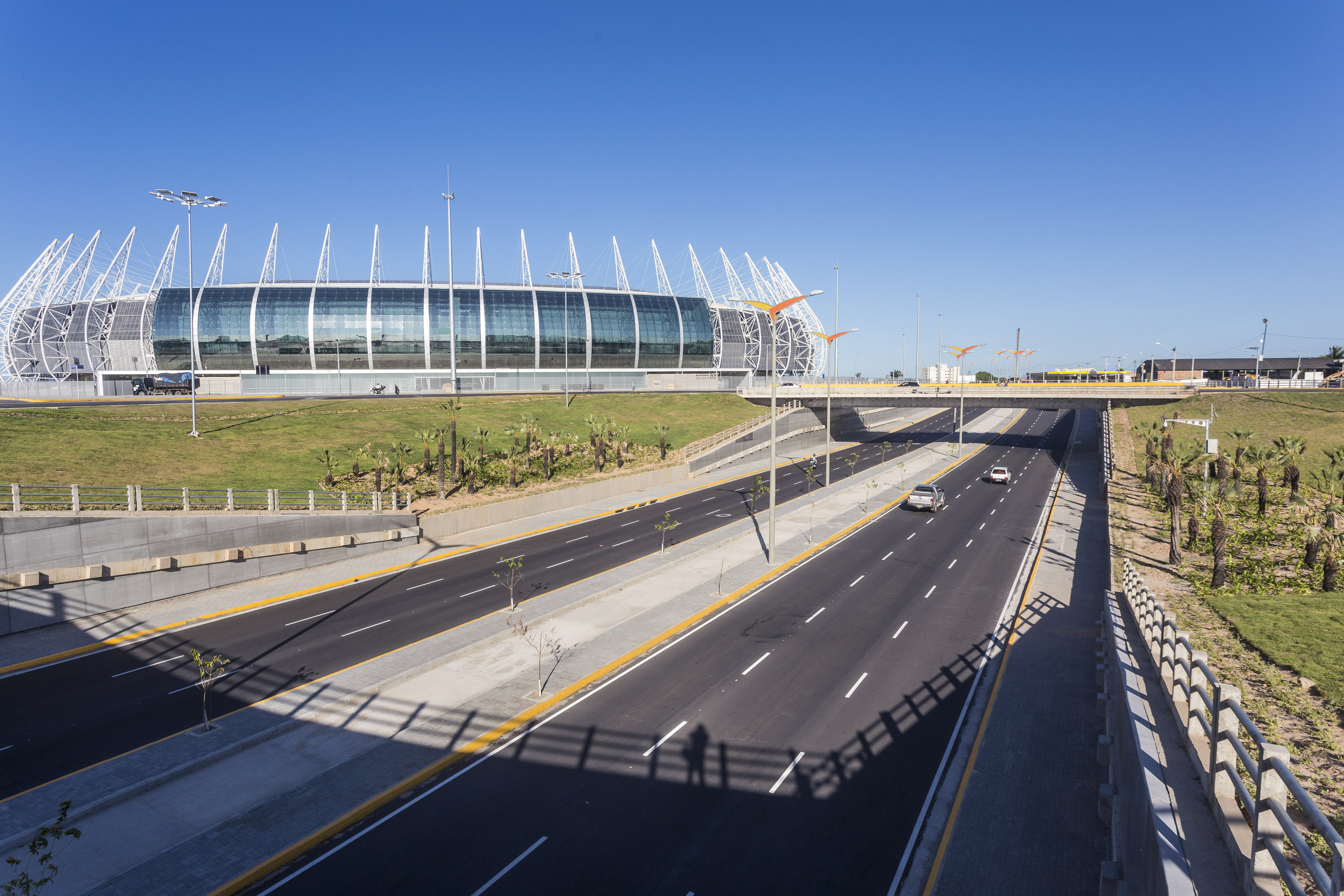

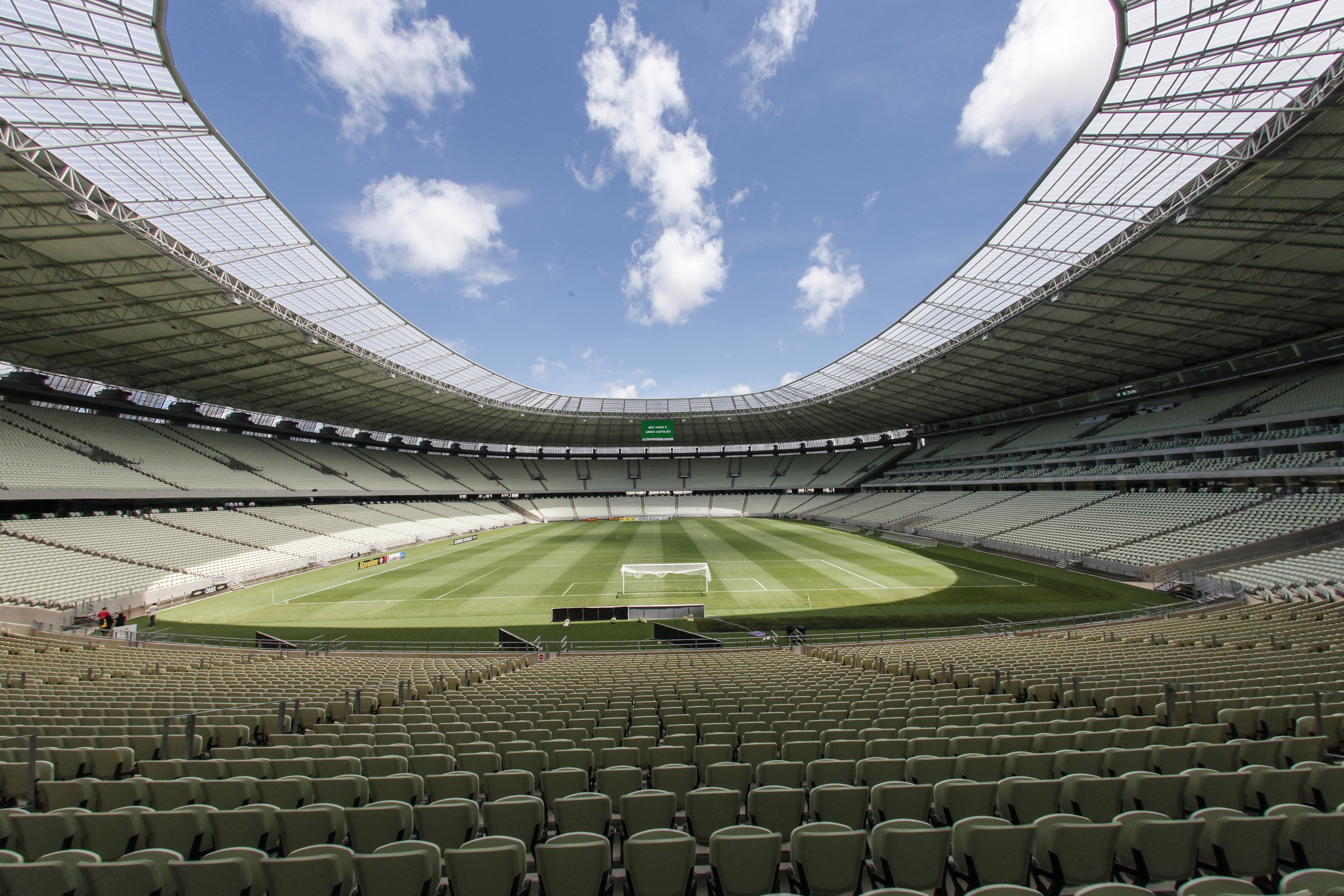

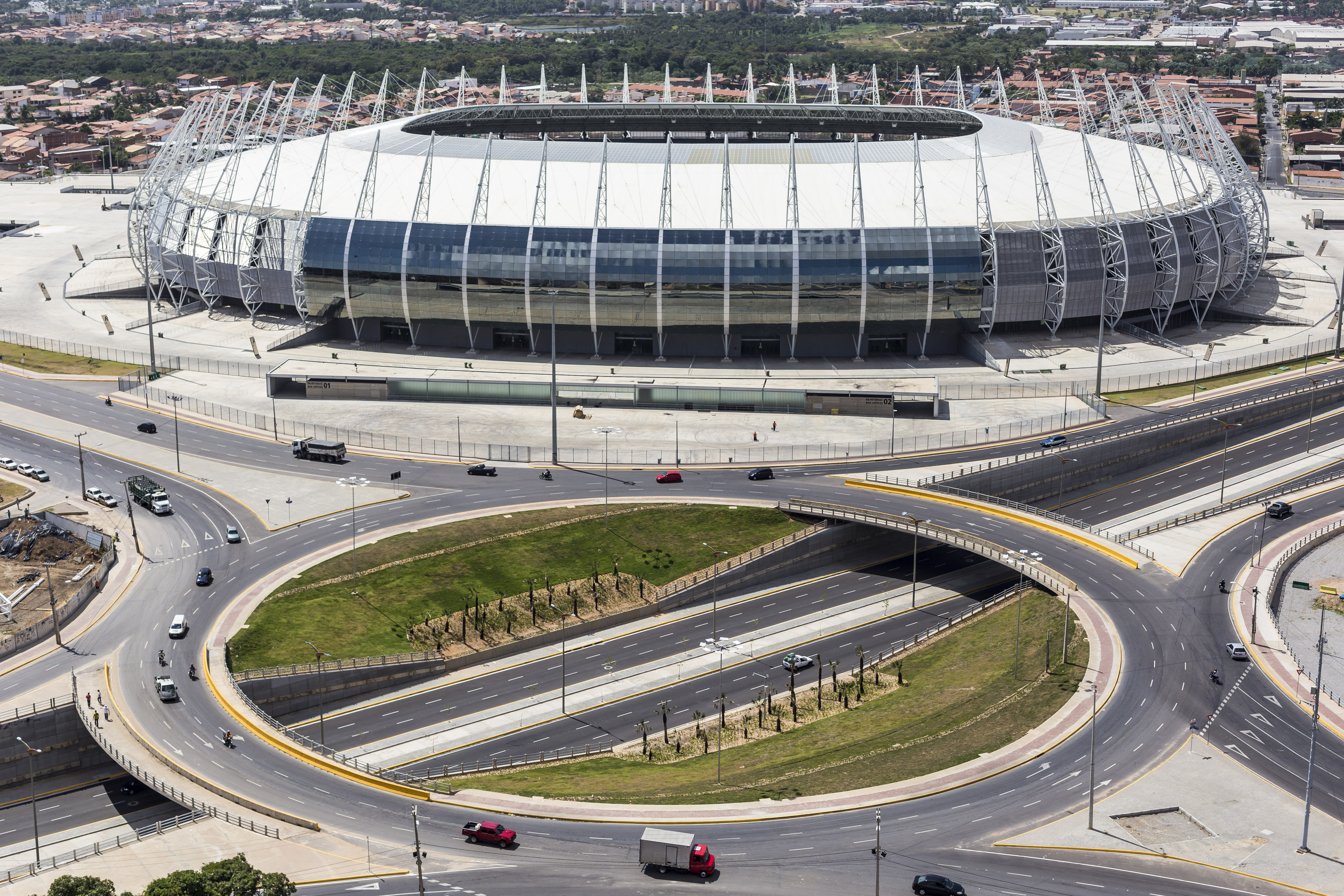

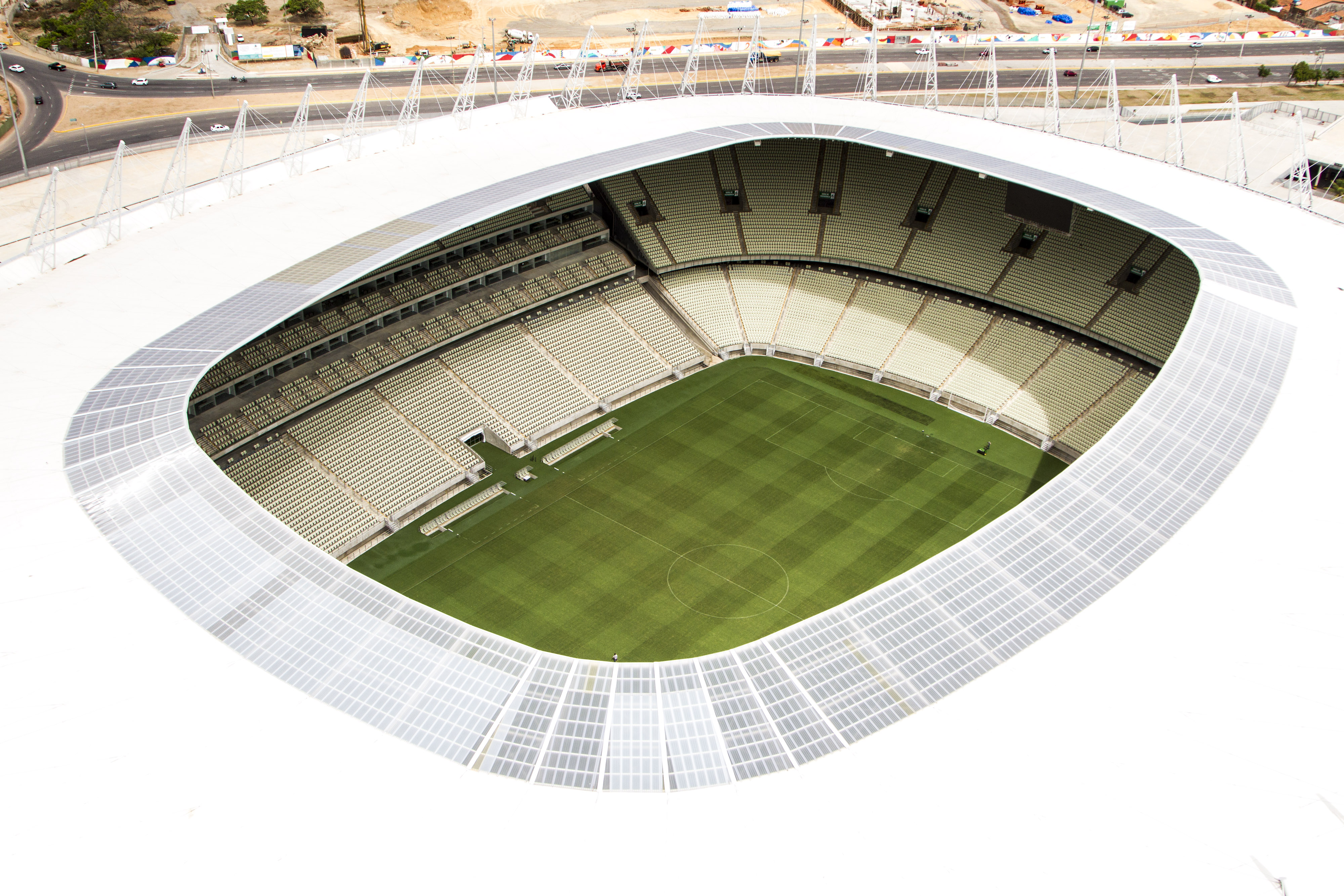

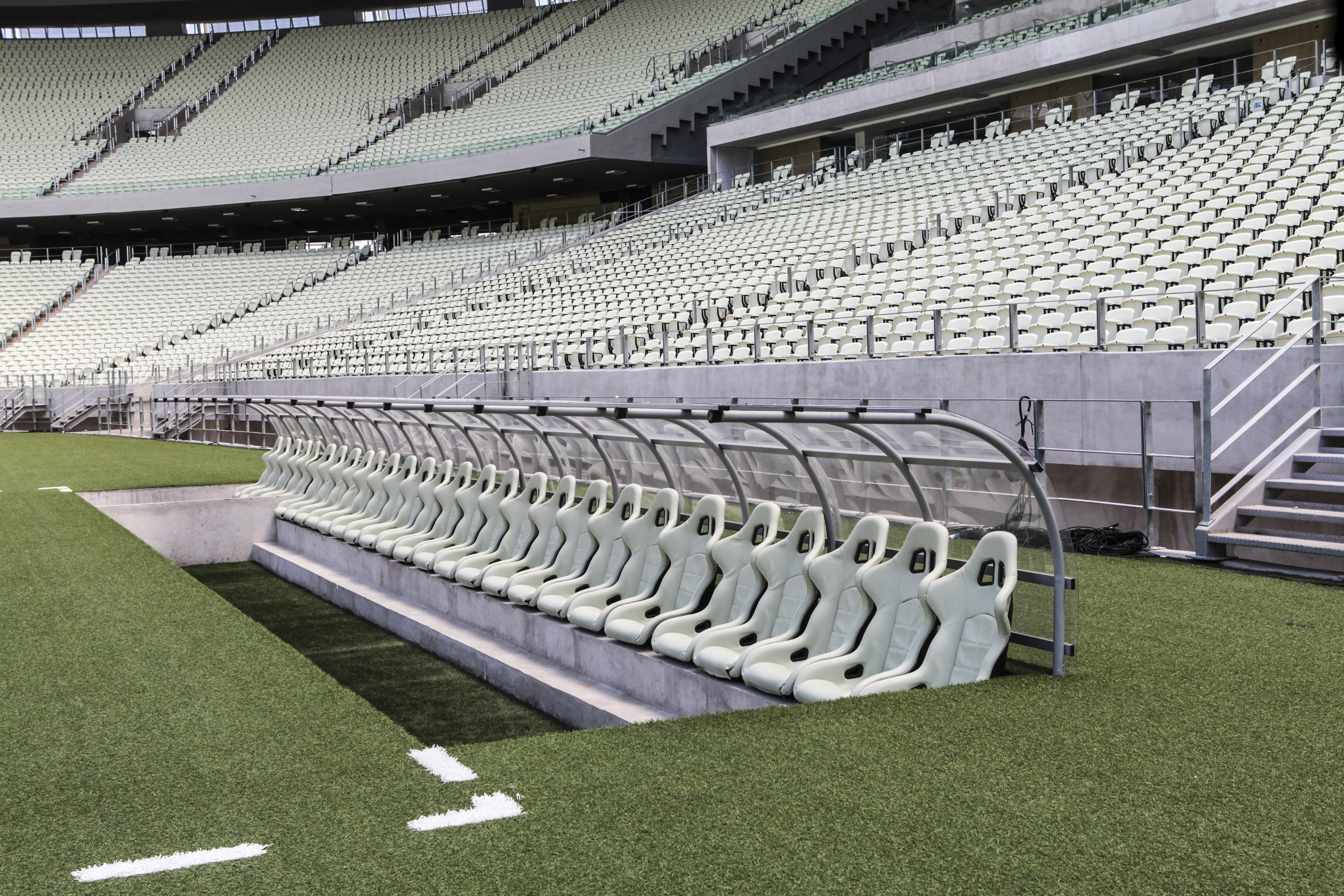

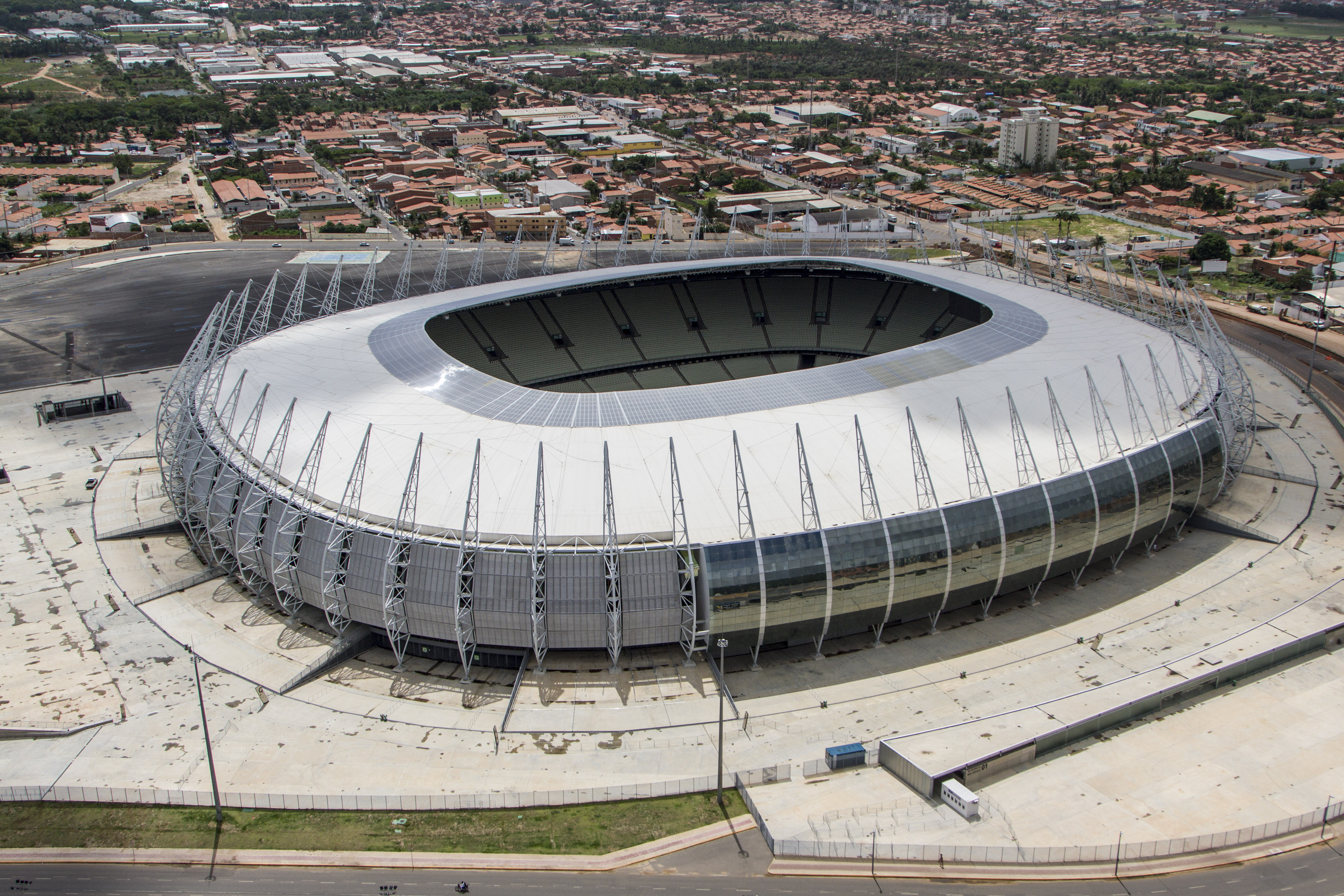

== See also ==
- List of football stadiums in Brazil
- Lists of stadiums
