= Héctor Vigliecca =

Uruguayan-born Brazilian architect and urban planner

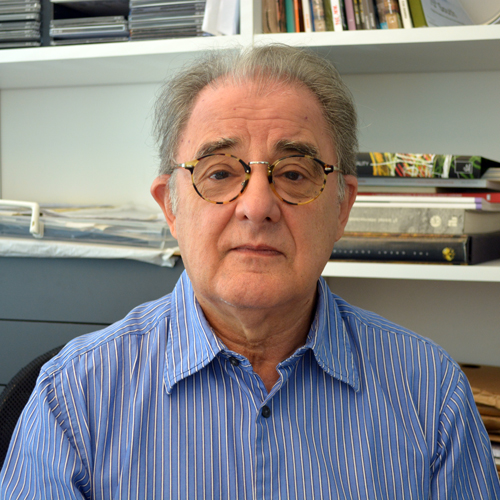
- Vigliecca in 2014
- Born: 16 October 1940 (age 85); Montevideo, Uruguay
- Occupation: Architect
- Awards: “Os Melhores de 2012”, Urban design category, APCA; “Mies van der Rohe Awards for Latin American Architecture” (1998) nomination
- Practice: Vigliecca & Associados
- Projects: SESC Nova Iguaçu, Arena Castelão, Rua Oscar Freire, Parque Novo Santo Amaro V, Deodoro Olympic Park in RIO 2016, National Library Annex in Rio de Janeiro

Héctor Vigliecca (born 16 October 1940, in Montevideo) is an architect and urban planner naturalized Brazilian. He collects a vast production of work that includes social housing projects, arenas multi-use and buildings in the cultural, educational and institutional realm as well as large-scale urban projects. He is the founder of the architecture office Vigliecca & Associados established in São Paulo. Among the prominent projects are OUC Mooca-Vila Carioca (Tamanduateí Neighborhoods), integrated studies in the area of 1.600 ha in São Paulo (SP), Castelão Arena, one of the venues of the 2014 FIFA World Cup in Brazil, Deodoro Olympic Park, the largest Olympic area of the Rio-2016, and Parque Novo Santo Amaro V, social housing project reference;

Vigliecca is known due to participation in national and international competitions, which resulted in 50 prizes and inspired the book “Hypotheses on Reality” (2012), gathering public competition projects designed between 1971 and 2011. He is also the author of "The Third Territory - Collective Housing and City (2014)" and one of the authors of "Arena Castelão - Governador Plácido Aderaldo Castelo (2014)" about Arena Castelão.

== Biography ==
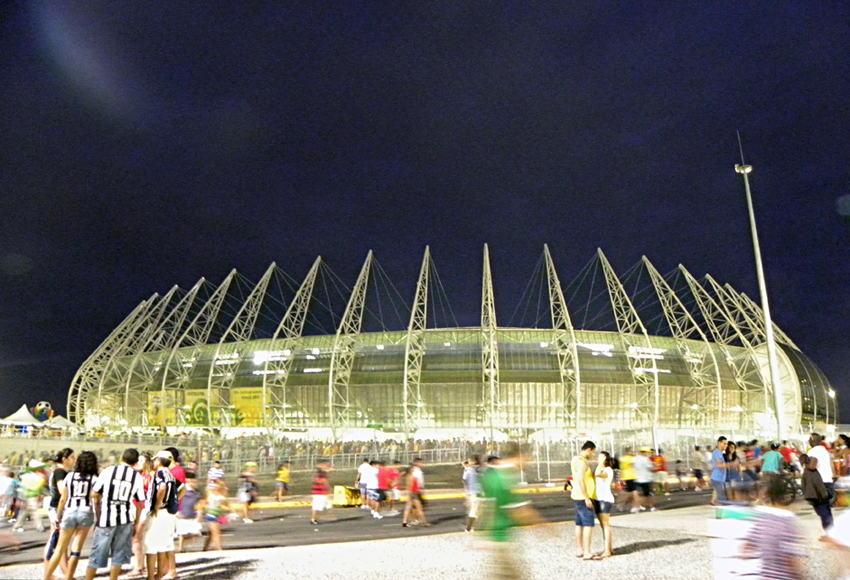
Arena Castelão, 2013

Graduated from the Universidad da La Republica – UDELAR (1968), under the mentorship of Antonio Cravotto in Montevideo, he participated, while still at the University, in a study group called Núcleo do Sol (Center of the Sun), that was ideologically against the concepts of the Athen’s Letter and believed in the lessons of Team X, in other words, the recovery of the streets, the continuous structure with well-balanced densities and mixed uses. The Núcleo do Sol invested in projects related to its surroundings that were socially engaged. After graduation, he spent three years in Europe, between England, Germany, Spain and Italy, where he earned a post-graduation degree in Urbanism at the Università degli Studi di Roma.

Once he returned to Montevideo in the early 70’s, he was a member of the ideal-office Estúdio 18, later on called Estúdio Reconquista (Reconquer Studio). This studio enabled several multiple punctual associations, characterized by a permanent critic sense and a constant exchange of ideas, all taking place in a very fraternal atmosphere. The Bulevar Artigas Complex, residential complex for the Uruguayan Cooperative Center (CCU) was designed during this phase by Héctor Vigliecca, Arturo Vilaamil, Ramiro Bascans and Thomas Sprechmann. This project is part of the exhibition “Latin America in Construction: Architecture 1955-1980” (29 March till 19 July 2015)at the MoMA, in New York, and belongs to the permanent collection of the museum.

In 1975, Hector moved to Brazil. In São Paulo, he worked with the architect Joaquim Guedes (participating in the Novotel project in Morumbi) and was head of the Nacional Architecture Consortium of Contracting Engineers (CNEC) – the golden ages of the Brazilian engineering firms – where we developed large-scale projects such as the construction of new cities flooded by damns. Right after, he inaugurated the office Padovano & Vigliecca Architects, that stayed active for seven years and in 1996, he founded Vigliecca and Associados – still active.

In parallel to his professional career, he has been active in the academic realm since the 70’s. He was a professor at the UDELAR Architecture School in Montevideo and also at the Mackenzie and UNIP Universities in São Paulo (from 1992 – 2012). He still acts as a special guest professor and lecturer.

== Prizes ==
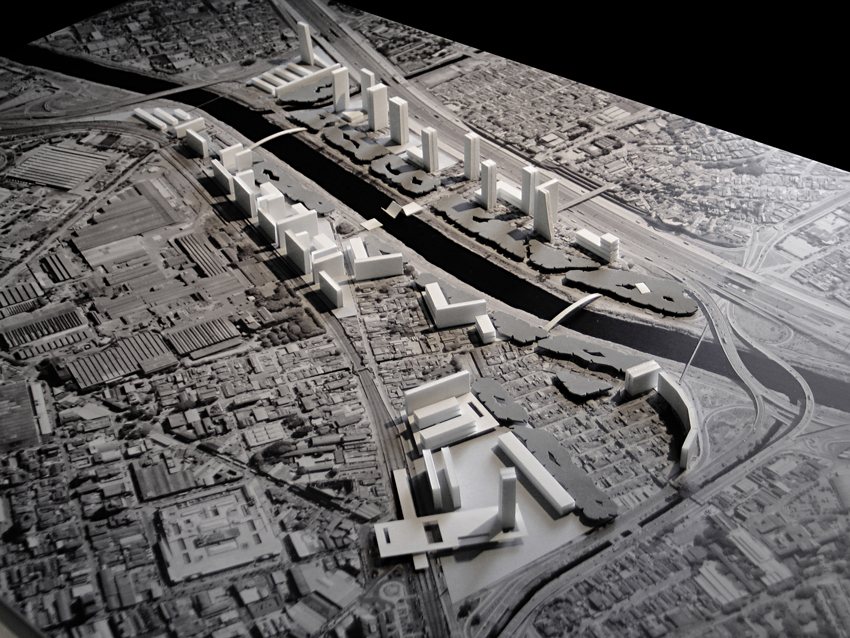
Maquete da OUC Tietê II, 2007

Héctor is one of the most awarded architects in Brazil. Amongst his main distinctions are “Best of 2012”, in the “Urbanity” category, awarded by the Paulista Association of Art Critics), “Distinction Award” at the São Paulo International Architecture Biennial (1993 and 2003), “The Best of Architecture” from Abril Publishers, for the Oscar Freire Street reurbanization project and the Heliópolis Favela social housing and reurbanization project, both in 2008, and the “Medalla de Oro” awarded by the Sociedad de Arquitectos de Uruguay (SAL) in 1977. In 2010 he received three prizes from the Brazilian Institute of Architects (IAB-SP) all at once: the “Joaquim Guedes Special Prize – Best Built Work (reurbanization of the Área de Portais, Osasco-SP), 1ST Prize in the Urbanism category (Urban Operation Consortium Tietê II Project – Osasco-SP)and Honorable Mention on Social Housing (Parque Novo Santo Amaro V). He was recognized by the São Paulo City Hall, “Honor to Latin-American urbanists that contributed to the construction of the city of São Paulo” (2011) and was nominated for the international awards by the Marcus Foundation Prize and the Mies van der Rohe prize, the latter being one of the most relevant architecture prizes in the world. His name is mentioned of “Premio Mies Van der Rohe de Arquitectura Latinoamericana” book.

His project entry for the international public competition for the Grand Egyptian Museum in Cairo received an honorable mention (2003). This was the largest international competition done in the last two decades with an unprecedented number of 1.557 participants, involving many of the great names in the international architecture scene, from which 20 were chosen on the first phase in order to award only ten on the final phase. Hector’s team was the only non-European team select, an accomplishment that guaranteed him as a star architect of the 21 st century and also gave him an unmatched experience of developing this substantial project for over a year, visiting the site three times.

The architect was honored by his home country, Uruguay, for his contribution to international football to carry out the project of Arena Castelão. The ceremony was held during the World Cup in Brazil in the Football Museum.

Héctor Vigliecca and his team won the 1st Prize on the National Library Foundation Building Annex Competition. The result was announced on November 14, 2014.

== Main Projects ==
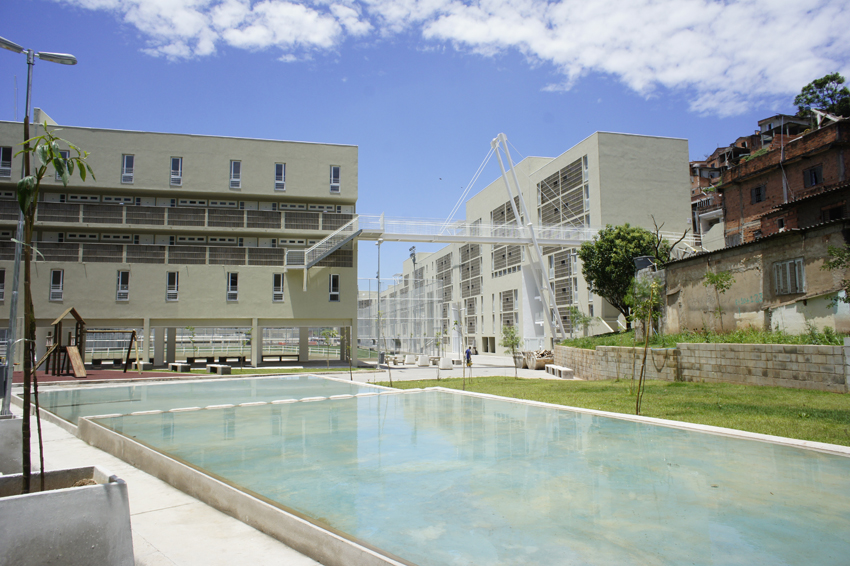
Parque Novo Santo Amaro V, 2012

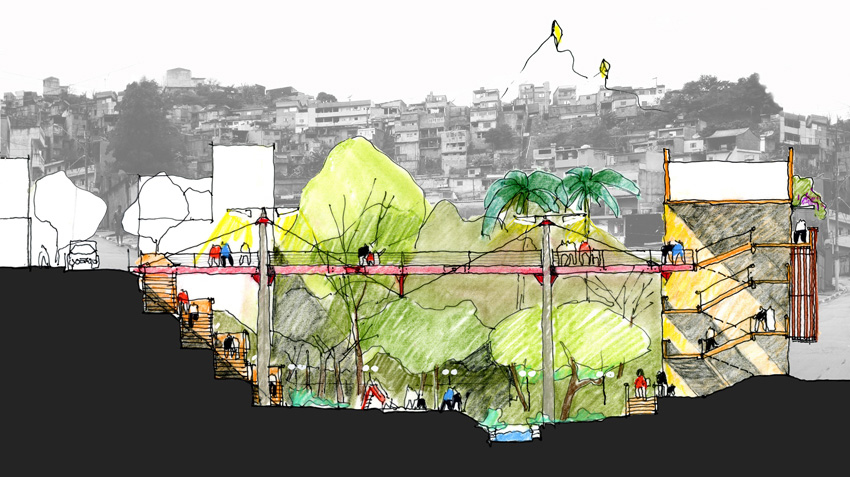
Croqui do Parque Novo Santo Amaro V, 2010

Héctor Vigliecca is known for introducing a new way of thinking about social housing in Brazil. He stands out as he raises questions and specific solutions for each theme, avoiding pre-conceived models and for his way of dealing with the natural landscape, respecting and recognizing the features of the environment and the pre-existing human experience. The Parque Novo Santo Amaro V project is an example. More than just housing families who used to live in precarious conditions, the project brought urban improvements to the low income community living on the borders of a water shore in the Southern part of the city of São Paulo. The project is inserted in the urban landscape, enhancing its qualities.

Another example is The Sílvio Baccarelli Residential Project (finished in 2013) but known as the Heliópolis Gleba H. The reurbanization and housing project in Heliópolis, one of the largest Brazilian favelas located in the South zone of São Paulo, is the second project done by the office in this area. Complex and innovative, this project reorganizes and shapes empty spaces left between pre-existing COHAB (São Paulo Metropolitan Housing Company) buildings in the same block, integrating them into a great new urban complex.

In 2001 he began to develop social housing Project for two municipal government programs: Renova SP – Perímetro do Morro S4 (S4 Hill Perimeter) in São Paulo and Morar Carioca/Morro dos Macacos in Rio de Janeiro.

Amongst the projects for which he was awarded first prize in competitions and public bidding contests are the Mooca-Vila Carioca Urban Operation Consortium, one of the largest urban plans in São Paulo (2012 – to date), and the Deodoro Olympic Park, one of the stages for the 2016 Olympics in Rio de Janeiro, with an area of 2,5 million square meters, where competitions in 11 Olympic and four Paralympic sports will be held at Games time.

Another large-scale project done by Héctor and his team was the Castelão Arena, in Fortaleza, third largest stadium in Brazil and one of the 12 chosen to host the 2014 FIFA World Cup Brazil – in addition to hosting the 2013 FIFA Confederations Cup. It was the only stadium to spend less than the estimated budget, the first one to be finished (December 15, 2012), the most affordable one of the last four World Cups, and the first South American arena to receive the international sustainability LEED certification.

It is also worth mentioning the SESC Nova Iguaçu, in Nova Iguaçu, Rio de Janeiro. It is one of the most significant Brazilian projects of his time. This project is among the 30 most significant projects of Brazilian Architecture. This project was the one responsible for his nomination to the Mies van der Rohe award in 1998.

Amongst his greatest international achievements are his Honorable Mention for the Grand Egyptian Museum and the finalist project for the Mexico National Library, both in 2003. It also was awarded an “Honorable Mention” for the competition Plan Nueva Alameda Providencia (2015) in Santiago Chile.

Parque Novo Santo Amaro's Social Housing Project, from Vigliecca & Associados, is considered one of the most expressive projects from Americas. It is one of the 36 “Outstanding Projects” selected from the 225 Mies Crown Hall Americas Prize (MCHAP) nominees. The award is conducted by the Faculty of Architecture at the Illinois Institute of Technology (IIT).

Héctor Vigliecca has participated of "La Biennale di Venezia" 2014 with two projects: Parque Novo Santo Amaro V and Jardim Vicentina.

== Architectonic Work ==
Principles introduced by Team X such as the abandonment of the abstract city in favor of the specific city, increasing the value of pedestrian space in detriment of the road system and the recovery of the street as a place for diversity and exchange were adopted and improved in the architecture of Héctor Vigliecca.

Through the analysis of his projects, it is possible to revisit many of the problems faced by architecture as well as issues that the city has been facing in these last four decades. It is also possible to revisit current theoretical references, with which the architect maintains a constant architectural debate. His influence coincides with an important period in which Brazil as changing the way it was facing the urban reality, including the complexities of informal occupations.

== Chronology – Selected Projects ==
- 1971 - Bulevar Artigas Complex – Montevideo, Uruguay
- 1973 - Uruguayan Embassy in Brasília
- 1976 - Main Commerce Bank – Jaú, SP
- 1984 - Rio de Janeiro National Public Library
- 1985 - Sesc Nova Iguaçu - Nova Iguaçu, RJ
- 1989 - UniFIEO Campus - Osasco, SP
- 1991 - Rio das Pedras Residential Housing Complex (Vila Mara) – São Paulo, SP
- 1997 - Rio Cidade II – Ramos (Rio de Janeiro – RJ) and the Post Office Cultural Center (São Paulo-SP)
- 1998 - FAPESP new Headquarters – São Paulo, SP
- 2000 - UNISUL Aquatic Center – Palhoça, SC
- 2001 - Reurbanization of 25 the Março Street and Oscar Freire Street – São Paulo, SP
- 2002 - The Carmo Mansion and the Urban Requalification of the Largo da Batata – São Paulo, SP
- 2003 - Great Egyptian Museum (Cairo, Egypt) and Mexico´s National Library (Mexico City, México)
- 2003 - Ibirapuera Sports Complex and the Elderly´s Village – São Paulo, SP
- 2004 - Bairro Novo (São Paulo-SP), Paraisópolis Complex Reurbanization (São Paulo-SP), Heliópolis Urbanization – Gleba A (São Paulo-SP) and Grand Axis of Beirut (Beirut, Lebanon)
- 2005 - Petrobras New Headquarters (Vitória-ES) and Guadalajara Library (Guadalajara, México)
- 2006 - Prague Library (Prague, Czech Republic) and Área de Portais/Colinas D´Oeste (Osasco-SP)
- 2007 - UFSCAR Laboratory (São Carlos–SP), Urban Plans for the neighborhood of Bonfim – OUC Tietê II (Osasco-SP)
- 2008 - CAF Headquarters (Caracas, Venezuela), Castelão Arena (Fortaleza-CE), Sports Secretariat (Fortaleza-CE) and CAF´s new offices.
- 2009 - Legislative Assembly (Porto Alegre-RS), Batistão Complex (Aracaju-SE), Sílvio Baccarelli Housing Complex (São Paulo-SP), Parque Novo Santo Amaro V (São Paulo-SP) and Parque Guarapiranga (São Paulo-SP)
- 2010 - Largo do Mercado and Praça dos Três Poderes – Florianópolis, SC
- 2011 - Plaza Armênia (Montevidéu, Uruguai), Fecomercio (Porto Alegre-RS), Renova SP – Morro do S4 (São Paulo-SP), Morar Carioca (Rio de Janeiro-RJ) and Porto Olímpico Carioca (Rio de Janeiro-RJ)
- 2012 - Vila-Carioca Urban Operation Consortium and the Power Museum – São Paulo, SP
- 2013 - Deodoro Olympic Complex RIO 2016
