= 2007 Israel Baseball League season =

Baseball league season in Israel

The 2007 Israel Baseball League season was the first season in the history of the Israel Baseball League. In the first game in the IBL's history, the Modi'in Miracle squared off against the Petach Tikva Pioneers at Yarkon Field in Petach Tikva. The Miracle won that game, beating Petach Tikva 9 to 1.

The champions of the 2007 IBL season were the Bet Shemesh Blue Sox. The Blue Sox defeated the Modi'in Miracle 3–0 on August 19, 2007, to win the championship.

== Standings ==
Israel Baseball League	W	L	Pct.	GB
Bet Shemesh Blue Sox	29	12	.707	--
Tel Aviv Lightning	26	14	.650	2.5
Modi'in Miracle	22	19	.537	7
Netanya Tigers	19	21	.475	9.5
Ra'anana Express	17	24	.415	12
Petach Tikva Pioneers	9	32	.220	20

== Stats ==
=== Batting leaders ===
Stat	Player	Total
AVG	Eladio Rodriguez (MOD)	.461
HR	Jason Rees (BS)	17
RBI	Jason Rees (BS)	50
R	Sean Slaughter (BS)	46
H	Raul Franco (TA)	51
SB	Mike Lyons (BS)	32

=== Pitching leaders ===
Stat	Player	Total
W	Juan Feliciano (BS); Aaron Pribble (TA); Rafael Bergstrom (BS)	7
L	Ari Alexenberg (PT); Andrew Morales (PT); John Thew (RAA)	6
ERA	Aaron Pribble (TA)	1.94
SO	Maximo Nelson (MOD)	85
SV	Maximo Nelson (MOD); Mike Etkin (TA); Eladio Rodriguez (BS)	2
IP	Maximo Nelson (MOD)	63.1
