= 2007 in baseball =

The following are the baseball events of the year 2007 throughout the world.

== Champions ==
=== Major League Baseball ===
- Regular Season Champions

League	Eastern Division Champion	Central Division Champion	Western Division Champion	Wild Card Qualifier
American League	Boston Red Sox	Cleveland Indians	Los Angeles Angels of Anaheim	New York Yankees
National League	Philadelphia Phillies	Chicago Cubs	Arizona Diamondbacks	Colorado Rockies

- World Series Champion – Boston Red Sox
- Postseason – October 2 to October 28

Division Series (ALDS, NLDS)
1	Boston	3
3	LA Angels	0
American League
2	Cleveland	3
4	NY Yankees	1
1	Arizona	3
3	Chicago Cubs	0
National League
2	Philadelphia	0
4	Colorado	3

League Championship Series (NLCS, ALCS)
1	Boston	4
2	Cleveland	3
1	Arizona	0
4	Colorado	4

World Series
AL1	Boston	4
NL4	Colorado	0

Higher seed had home field advantage during Division Series and League Championship Series.
The American League champion has home field advantage during the World Series as a result of the AL victory in the All-Star Game.

- Postseason MVPs
  - World Series MVP – Mike Lowell (Boston Red Sox)
  - ALCS MVP – Josh Beckett (Boston Red Sox)
  - NLCS MVP – Matt Holliday (Colorado Rockies)
- All-Star Game, July 10 at AT&T Park – American League, 5–4; Ichiro Suzuki (Seattle Mariners), MVP
  - State Farm Insurance Home Run Derby, July 9 – Vladimir Guerrero (Los Angeles Angels of Anaheim)

=== Other champions ===
- Minor League Baseball
  - Triple-A Championship: Sacramento River Cats (Athletics)
    - International League: Richmond Braves (Braves)
    - Pacific Coast League: Sacramento River Cats (Athletics)
    - Mexican League: Sultanes de Monterrey
  - AA
    - Eastern League: Erie SeaWolves
    - Southern League: Montgomery Biscuits
    - Texas League: San Antonio Missions
  - A-Advanced
    - California League: San Jose Giants
    - Carolina League: Frederick Keys
    - Florida State League: Clearwater Threshers
  - Class A
    - Midwest League: West Michigan Whitecaps
    - South Atlantic League: Columbus Catfish
  - Class A Short Season
    - New York–Penn League: Auburn Doubledays
    - Northwest League: Salem-Keizer Volcanoes
  - Rookie
    - Appalachian League: Elizabethton Twins
    - Gulf Coast League: Gulf Coast Yankees
    - Pioneer League: Orem Owlz
    - Arizona League: AZL Mariners
- Independent baseball leagues
  - Alaska Baseball League: Fairbanks AIA Fire
  - American Association: Fort Worth Cats
  - Atlantic League: Newark Bears
  - Canadian-American Association: Nashua Pride
  - Frontier League: Windy City ThunderBolts
  - Golden Baseball League: Chico Outlaws
  - Northern League: Gary SouthShore RailCats
  - United League Baseball: Alexandria Aces
- Amateur
  - College baseball
    - College World Series: Oregon State University def. University of North Carolina 2 games to 0
    - NCAA Division II: University of Tampa
    - NCAA Division III: Kean University
    - NAIA: Lewis-Clark State College
  - Youth
    - Big League World Series: Easley, South Carolina
    - Junior League World Series: Warner Robins, Georgia
    - Little League World Series: Pearl City, Hawaii
    - Senior League World Series: Cartersville, Georgia
- International
  - National teams
    - Baseball World Cup: United States
    - Asian Baseball Championship: Japan
    - European Baseball Championship: Netherlands
    - Pan-Am Games: Cuba
  - International club team competitions
    - Caribbean Series: Águilas Cibaeñas (Dominican Republic)
    - European Cup: Corendon Kinheim (Netherlands) [1]
    - Konami Cup Asia Series: Chunichi Dragons (Japan)
  - Domestic leagues
    - Australia – Claxton Shield : Victoria Aces
    - China Baseball League – Tianjin Lions
    - Cuban National Series: Santiago de Cuba
    - Dominican Winter League: Águilas Cibaeñas
    - Holland Series: Corendon Kinheim
    - Italian Serie A1 Scudetto – Grosseto
    - Japan Series: Chunichi Dragons
    - Korean Series – SK Wyverns
    - Mexican Pacific League: Naranjeros de Hermosillo
    - Puerto Rican Professional Baseball League: Gigantes de Carolina
    - Taiwan Series – Uni-President Lions
    - Venezuelan Professional Baseball League: Tigres de Aragua

1 – The appearance by the Huskies of Rouen, France in the final marks the first time since 1976 that a team from outside the professional leagues of the Netherlands or Italy has finished in the top two.

== Awards and honors ==
- Baseball Hall of Fame honors
  - Cal Ripken Jr. and Tony Gwynn are elected by the BBWAA in their first year of eligibility.
  - Rick Hummel, columnist for the St. Louis Post-Dispatch who covered the St. Louis Cardinals for three decades, received the J. G. Taylor Spink Award.
  - Denny Matthews, broadcaster for the Kansas City Royals since the team's 1969 formation, received the Ford C. Frick Award.
- MVP Awards
  - National League Jimmy Rollins, Philadelphia Phillies
  - American League Alex Rodriguez, New York Yankees
- Cy Young Awards
  - National League Jake Peavy, San Diego Padres
  - American League CC Sabathia, Cleveland Indians
- Rookie of the Year Awards
  - National League Ryan Braun, Milwaukee Brewers
  - American League Dustin Pedroia, Boston Red Sox
- Manager of the Year Awards
  - National League Bob Melvin, Arizona Diamondbacks
  - American League Eric Wedge, Cleveland Indians
- Woman Executive of the Year (major or minor league): Shari Massengill, Kinston Indians, Carolina League
- Silver Slugger Awards
  - American League
    - DH: David Ortiz
    - C: Jorge Posada
    - 1B: Carlos Peña
    - 2B: Plácido Polanco
    - 3B: Alex Rodriguez
    - SS: Derek Jeter
    - OF: Vladimir Guerrero
    - OF: Magglio Ordóñez
    - OF: Ichiro Suzuki
  - National League
    - P: Micah Owings
    - C: Russell Martin
    - 1B: Prince Fielder
    - 2B: Chase Utley
    - 3B: David Wright
    - SS: Jimmy Rollins
    - OF: Carlos Beltrán
    - OF: Matt Holliday
    - OF: Carlos Lee

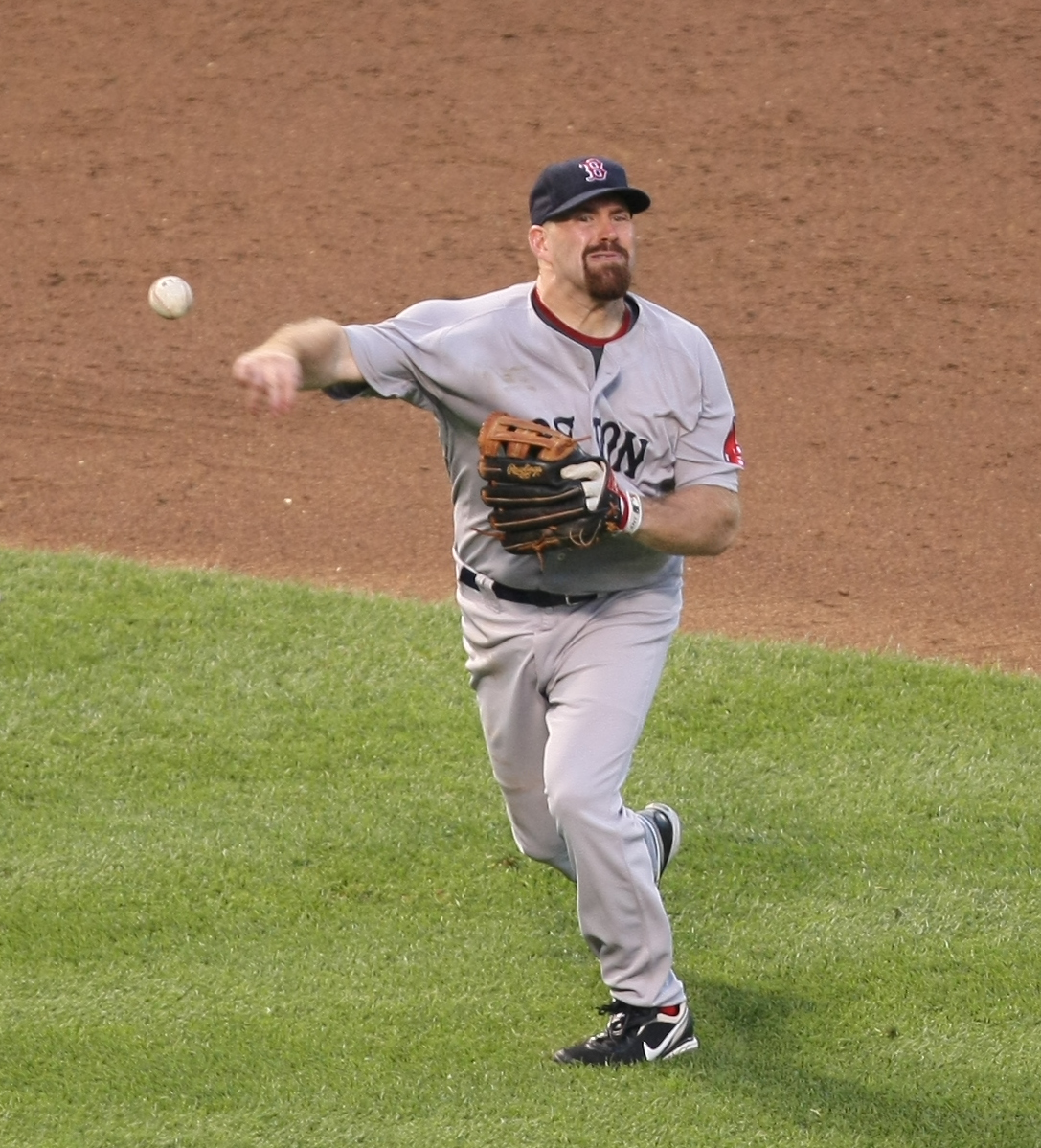
Gold Glove first baseman Kevin Youkilis

- Gold Glove Awards
  - American League
    - P: Johan Santana
    - C: Iván Rodríguez
    - 1B: Kevin Youkilis
    - 2B: Plácido Polanco
    - 3B: Adrián Beltré
    - SS: Orlando Cabrera
    - OF: Torii Hunter
    - OF: Grady Sizemore
    - OF: Ichiro Suzuki
  - National League
    - P: Greg Maddux (his record 17th)
    - C: Russell Martin
    - 1B: Derrek Lee
    - 2B: Orlando Hudson
    - 3B: David Wright
    - SS: Jimmy Rollins
    - OF: Carlos Beltrán
    - OF: Jeff Francoeur *
    - OF: Andruw Jones
    - OF: Aaron Rowand *

* Francoeur and Rowand finished tied in the voting

== Major league baseball final standings ==
American League
Rank	Club	Wins	Losses	Win %	GB
East Division
1st	Boston Red Sox	96	66	.593	–
2nd	New York Yankees^{†}	94	68	.580	2.0
3rd	Toronto Blue Jays	83	79	.512	13.0
4th	Baltimore Orioles	69	93	.426	27.0
5th	Tampa Bay Devil Rays	66	96	.407	30.0
Central Division
1st	Cleveland Indians	96	66	.593	–
2nd	Detroit Tigers	88	74	.543	8.0
3rd	Minnesota Twins	79	83	.488	17.0
4th	Chicago White Sox	72	90	.444	24.0
5th	Kansas City Royals	69	93	.426	27.0
West Division
1st	Los Angeles Angels	94	68	.580	–
2nd	Seattle Mariners	88	74	.543	6.0
3rd	Oakland Athletics	76	86	.469	18.0
4th	Texas Rangers	75	87	.463	19.0

National League
Rank	Club	Wins	Losses	Win %	GB
East Division
1st	Philadelphia Phillies	89	73	.549	–
2nd	New York Mets	88	74	.543	1.0
3rd	Atlanta Braves	84	78	.519	5.0
4th	Washington Nationals	73	89	.451	16.0
5th	Florida Marlins	71	91	.438	18.0
Central Division
1st	Chicago Cubs	85	77	.525	–
2nd	Milwaukee Brewers	83	79	.512	2.0
3rd	St. Louis Cardinals	78	84	.481	7.0
4th	Houston Astros	73	89	.451	12.0
5th	Cincinnati Reds	72	90	.444	13.0
6th	Pittsburgh Pirates	68	94	.420	17.0
West Division
1st	Arizona Diamondbacks	90	72	.556	–
2nd	Colorado Rockies^{†}	90	73	.552	0.5
3rd	San Diego Padres	89	74	.546	1.5
4th	Los Angeles Dodgers	82	80	.506	8.0
5th	San Francisco Giants	71	91	.438	19.0

†Denotes the club that won the wild card for its respective league. The Rockies defeated the Padres 9–8 (13) in a one-game playoff for the NL wild card.

The 90 wins by the Diamondbacks and Rockies were the fewest to lead the NL since 1959, with the exception of the strike-shortened seasons of 1981, 1994 and 1995. No NL team won or lost 95 games for the first time since 1983.

Also, this was the second consecutive season in which no team won at least 60% of its games, the first time that this has happened in Major League Baseball history.

== Events ==
=== January–March ===
- January 9 – As the result of questions regarding his involvement in the ongoing steroids investigations, Mark McGwire falls well short in his first effort to be elected to the Baseball Hall of Fame. Cal Ripken Jr. and Tony Gwynn, meanwhile, are elected easily.
- January 11 – The New York Daily News reports that Barry Bonds tests positive for amphetamines at some point during the 2006 season and that Bonds initially cites a supplement he receives from San Francisco Giants teammate Mark Sweeney as a possible reason for the positive test. Testing rules established in 2006 require that first positive tests must remain confidential.
- February 4 – The Israel Baseball League announces the official teams of the inaugural season: Bet Shemesh Blue Sox, Modi'in Miracle, Netanya Tigers, Petach Tikva Pioneers, Ra'anana Express, Tel Aviv Lightning. Dropped from the league are the Haifa Stingrays and Jerusalem Lions.
- March 31 – The St. Louis Cardinals defeat the Cleveland Indians 5–1 in the inaugural Civil Rights Game, held at AutoZone Park in Memphis, Tennessee.

=== April ===
- April 2:
  - Bruce Froemming works behind home plate for the opener between the Athletics and Mariners, tying Bill Klem's major league record of 37 seasons as an umpire.
  - The Tribune Company, after agreeing to a buyout of $8.2 billion by real estate magnate Sam Zell, announces that the Chicago Cubs are to be sold following the 2007 season.
- April 10 – 12 – In a case of life imitating art, the Cleveland Indians, displaced by a freak spring snowstorm, play a series against the Los Angeles Angels in Milwaukee. Most of the game action in the 1989 film Major League, in which the Indians are the featured team, is actually filmed in Milwaukee at the Brewers' home at that time, County Stadium.
- April 15 – To celebrate the sixtieth anniversary of Jackie Robinson's first major league game, dozens of players wear his league-wide retired number, 42. The Los Angeles Dodgers are one of six teams whose entire roster wears number 42 for their games.
- April 15 – Marco Scutaro hits a three-run, walk-off home run against Mariano Rivera with two outs in the bottom of ninth inning to lead the Oakland Athletics to a 5–4 victory against the New York Yankees.
- April 17 - The Washington Nationals pay tribute to the victims of the school shooting at Virginia Tech. The Nationals take the field in the second inning of a game versus the Atlanta Braves wearing Virginia Tech hats. The hat of Chris Snelling currently resides in the hall of fame at Cooperstown.
- April 18 – Mark Buehrle of the Chicago White Sox pitches a no-hitter against the Texas Rangers, becoming the team's first pitcher since Wilson Álvarez in 1991, and the 16th in franchise history, to throw a no-hitter.
- April 20 – Bruce Froemming umpires at first base in the Cleveland Indians-Tampa Bay Devil Rays game, passing Bill Klem to become – at age 67 years, 204 days – the oldest umpire in major league history.
- April 22 – Chase Wright of the New York Yankees gives up four consecutive home runs in the third inning against the Boston Red Sox, joining Paul Foytack to become only the second player to accomplish this dubious feat. Manny Ramírez, J. D. Drew, Mike Lowell, and Jason Varitek hit the home runs.
- April 23 – Alex Rodriguez of the New York Yankees hits two home runs, his 13th and 14th of the season, in a 10–8 loss to the Tampa Bay Devil Rays, surpassing the American League record and tying the Major League record for most home runs hit in the month of April.
- April 29:
  - Manny Ramírez becomes the fifth player to hit at least 50 career home runs against the New York Yankees, leading his Red Sox to a 7–4 victory.
  - Troy Tulowitzki of the Colorado Rockies performs the 13th unassisted triple play in MLB history, catching a Chipper Jones line drive, tagging second base to force Kelly Johnson out off the bag, then tagging out Édgar Rentería in the 7th inning of an 11-inning 9–7 Rockies victory over the Atlanta Braves.
  - The Sunday night game between the St. Louis Cardinals and the Chicago Cubs is postponed due to the death of Cardinals relief pitcher Josh Hancock early that morning.

=== May ===
- May 6 – Roger Clemens announces to the crowd at Yankee Stadium that he has signed a contract to play for the New York Yankees for the remainder of the season.
- May 13:
  - Fred Lewis of the San Francisco Giants hits for the cycle at Coors Field in a 15–2 victory over the Colorado Rockies. He led the game off with a double in the 1st, then hit a three-run home run—the first of his career—in the 4th, an RBI triple in the 5th, and capped the cycle off with a single in the 7th.
  - Miguel Tejada plays in his 1,118th consecutive game, passing Billy Williams for 5th place all time. However, the Boston Red Sox come back from a 5–0 deficit in the ninth inning en route to a 6–5 victory over the Baltimore Orioles.
- May 21 – In the Hall of Fame Game at Doubleday Field in Cooperstown, New York, the Baltimore Orioles defeat the Toronto Blue Jays 13–7 with five home runs, including two by minor league catcher Brian Bock.
- May 31 – According to the Elias Sports Bureau, for the first time since 1900, the Chicago White Sox lose a game in which the opposing team had no base runners on base at the beginning of any at-bat. Starting pitcher Mark Buehrle surrendered two home runs, but no other hits or walks in a 2–0 loss to the Blue Jays.

=== June ===
- June 4 – Mark Ellis hits for the cycle at McAfee Coliseum as his Oakland Athletics defeat the Boston Red Sox, 5–4 in 11 innings. He hit a triple in the 2nd inning, a solo home run in the 4th and a double in the 6th. Although a fielder's choice in the 8th with the A's holding the lead seemingly ended his run for the cycle, a rally by the Red Sox in the 9th pushed extra innings, allowing Ellis to get the single he needed in the 10th inning.
- June 5 – The Toronto Blue Jays score six runs in the bottom of the 9th when down 11–6 to beat the Tampa Bay Devil Rays 12–11, the second five-run deficit overcome in the ninth this season.
- June 6:
  - In the San Diego Padres' 5–2 win over the Dodgers, closer Trevor Hoffman becomes the first pitcher to record 500 career saves.
  - Minnesota Twin Luis Castillo commits an error—his first after 143 errorless games at second base. The record is short-lived, as Detroit Tiger Plácido Polanco has a similar streak running concurrently, and his ends at 186 games, the new record.
- June 7:
  - Curt Schilling carries a no-hitter into the bottom of the 9th with two outs before surrendering a single to Shannon Stewart as the Red Sox defeat the A's 1–0. Schilling becomes the first pitcher to give up a no-hitter with two out in the 9th since Mike Mussina blew a perfect game in 2001.
  - Joe Torre of the New York Yankees becomes the tenth manager to win 2,000 major league games.
- June 12 – Justin Verlander of the Detroit Tigers pitches a 4–0 no-hitter against the Milwaukee Brewers. It is the third no-hitter in regular interleague play, the first at Comerica Park, and the first for the Tigers since 1984.
- June 15 – The New York Yankees' 44-year old Roger Clemens faces the New York Mets' 49-year old Julio Franco in the top of the second inning of what is eventually a Yankee 2–0 shutout win and Franco flies out to right. In what is an otherwise nondescript moment, this is the oldest combined batter-pitcher occurrence ever in the major leagues to date.
- June 16 – The Cubs and Padres each collect only two hits as Russell Branyan's home run in the ninth inning gives San Diego a 1–0 win. The Cubs' Carlos Zambrano takes a no-hitter into the eighth, while Padres starter Chris Young allows no hits before being ejected in the fourth following a brawl.
- June 18 – In the longest game in College World Series history (5 hours 40 minutes), UC Irvine eliminates Cal State Fullerton with a 5–4 win in 13 innings.
- June 20 – Sammy Sosa becomes the fifth major leaguer to hit 600 home runs when he connects against Jason Marquis in the Texas Rangers' 7–3 win over the Cubs. It is his first home run against his former club, giving him at least one against every major league team.
- June 24:
  - Modi'in Miracle win the first ever regular-season game in the Israel Baseball League, beating the Petach Tikva Pioneers, 9–1, at Yarkon Sports Complex in Petach Tikva.
  - Dustin McGowan of the Toronto Blue Jays has what would have been the second no-hitter in franchise history broken up in the ninth in a 5–0 victory over the Colorado Rockies at the Rogers Centre. Jeff Baker singles to lead off the inning; the hit is the only one McGowan will allow. Dave Stieb has currently hurled the only no-hitter in Blue Jay history, in 1990.
- June 27:
  - Ryan Howard of the Philadelphia Phillies becomes the fastest player in major league history to reach 100 career home runs, taking only 325 games to do so. He surpasses Ralph Kiner, who took 385 games.
  - Greg Maddux, Tom Glavine and John Smoltz, the core of the Atlanta Braves' pitching staff from 1993 to 2002, all record victories on the same day. At AT&T Park, Maddux gives up only five hits in seven innings in the San Diego Padres' 4–2 victory over the San Francisco Giants. At Shea Stadium, Glavine, pitching for the New York Mets, shuts out the St. Louis Cardinals 2–0 in a game that is called after 5 1/2 innings; a second-inning infield single by Scott Rolen is the only hit he allows. At Turner Field, Smoltz, the only member of the trio still pitching for the Braves, pitches five innings of shutout ball as the Braves defeat the Washington Nationals 13–0.
- June 28:
  - Frank Thomas becomes the 21st player in major league history to record 500 home runs with a first-inning homer off the Minnesota Twins' Carlos Silva at the Hubert H. Humphrey Metrodome.
  - Craig Biggio becomes the 27th player in major league history to record 3,000 hits with a seventh-inning single – his third hit of the game – against the Colorado Rockies at Minute Maid Park. Biggio becomes the first member of the 3,000 hit club to be called out at the end of his milestone hit, having been caught trying to stretch the hit into a double. He is the 14th player to record 3,000 hits with his initial team, and in September ends his career with 3,060 hits.
- June 29
  - Aubrey Huff of the Baltimore Orioles hits for the cycle at Oriole Park at Camden Yards in a 9–7 loss to the Los Angeles Angels of Anaheim. Huff becomes the third Orioles player to do so, joining Brooks Robinson and Cal Ripken Jr., and the first Oriole to hit for the cycle at home in Baltimore. In addition, the triple is his 1000th hit and the double is his 200th double.
  - Barry Bonds hits his 750th home run off of Liván Hernández in the 8th inning at AT&T Park as his San Francisco Giants lose 6–4 to the Arizona Diamondbacks. Before his historic at-bat, he is hugged in right field by a drunken fan in the top of the 8th, and he assists the fan off the field without incident.

=== July ===
- July 2 – Roger Clemens becomes the eighth major league pitcher to win 350 games, in the Yankees' 5–1 win over the Minnesota Twins.
- July 6 – With wins of 20–14 and 12–0, the Minnesota Twins score the most runs in a doubleheader since the Boston Red Sox scored 35 times and swept Philadelphia on July 4, 1939. The Twins are led in the nightcap by Justin Morneau, who hit three homers. He is the fourth Twin to homer three times in a game, and the first since Tony Oliva in 1973.
- July 9 – Vladimir Guerrero of the Los Angeles Angels wins the 2007 Home Run Derby in San Francisco. Despite the highly publicized presence of McCovey Cove beyond the right field fence, not a single home run touches the water.
- July 10 – The American League beats the National League 5–4 in the 2007 MLB All-Star Game in San Francisco; Ichiro Suzuki of the Seattle Mariners is named MVP after hitting the first-ever inside-the-park home run in All-Star Game history.
- July 15 – The St. Louis Cardinals beat the Philadelphia Phillies 10–2, making the Phillies the first team in professional sports history to lose 10,000 games.
- July 20 – Cuba defeats the United States 3–1 to win its 10th consecutive gold medal at the Pan-Am Games.
- July 22 – Mike Coolbaugh of the Texas League Tulsa Drillers is killed when he is struck in the neck by a line drive foul ball while coaching at first base.
- July 31 – In routing the Chicago White Sox 16–3 at Yankee Stadium, the New York Yankees tie a 68-year, single-game franchise record by hitting eight home runs. They had also hit eight home runs (then setting a Major League record) on June 28, 1939, in the first game of a doubleheader against the Philadelphia Athletics.

=== August ===
- August 4:
  - Alex Rodriguez becomes the 22nd player to hit 500 career home runs in the Yankees' 16–8 victory over the Royals, and at age 32 becomes the youngest player to reach the milestone.
  - Barry Bonds ties Hank Aaron's record of 755 career home runs with a second-inning shot off San Diego's Clay Hensley.
- August 5 – Tom Glavine becomes the 23rd pitcher, and just the fifth left-hander, to earn 300 career wins as the New York Mets defeat the Chicago Cubs 8–3 at Wrigley Field.
- August 7 – Barry Bonds surpasses Hank Aaron's record of 755 career home runs with a fifth-inning shot off Washington's Mike Bacsik.
- August 8 – Miguel Tejada records his 1,000th career run batted in.
- August 9:
  - Roger Clemens is suspended for the fourth time in his career for hitting Toronto's Alex Ríos with a pitch after both teams were warned.
  - Rick Ankiel, formerly a pitcher with infamous control problems, returns to the major leagues as an outfielder for the St. Louis Cardinals, hitting a 3-run home run in his fourth at-bat.
- August 14 – Atlanta Braves manager Bobby Cox is ejected by umpire Ted Barrett at the end of the fifth inning after arguing a called third strike against Chipper Jones at Turner Field. The ejection is Cox' 132nd of his career, breaking a record he had shared with John McGraw.
- August 17:
  - Brandon Webb tosses his third straight shutout to achieve 42 innings of scoreless baseball.
  - After trailing the Milwaukee Brewers by 8 1/2 games in the National League Central on June 23, the Chicago Cubs take over sole possession of first place for the first time on the season by defeating the St. Louis Cardinals 2–1 at Wrigley Field, while the Brewers lose to the Cincinnati Reds 8–3 at Miller Park.
- August 19 – Johan Santana picks up his 13th win of the year behind a career-best and club-record 17 strikeouts in eight innings, helping the Twins wrap up their three-game series at home with the Rangers. Sammy Sosa notches the only two Rangers hits.
- August 20 – Bobby Jenks' tied record of 41 consecutive retired batters comes to an end when Joey Gathright of the Kansas City Royals hits a single to lead off the top of the ninth inning of a game between the Royals and White Sox.
- August 22 – In the first game of a doubleheader, the Texas Rangers beat the Baltimore Orioles 30–3, setting a new record for runs scored by a single team in a game in the modern (post-1900) era, and the American League all-time record. The Rangers' 30 runs were the most in a game since the Chicago Colts beat the Louisville Colonels 36–7 on June 29, 1897. With a 9–7 victory in the second game, the Rangers also set the record for most runs scored by a single team in a doubleheader, with 39.
- August 31 – Scott Baker of the Minnesota Twins takes a perfect game into the ninth inning against the Kansas City Royals, but walks the first batter and eventually settles for a 5–0 one-hitter (surrendering a single to Mike Sweeney).

=== September ===
- September 1 – In his second major league start, Red Sox rookie Clay Buchholz pitches a 10–0 no-hitter over the Orioles at Fenway Park, becoming the third pitcher to throw a no-hitter in his first or second career start since 1900. Bobo Holloman (first, 1953) and Wilson Álvarez (second, 1991) are the others.
- September 3
  - Ichiro Suzuki of the Mariners records his 200th hit of the season, a home run off the Yankees' Roger Clemens. It is the seventh consecutive season he has reached this mark, tying him with Wade Boggs for the modern major league record.
  - Mets pitcher Pedro Martínez records his 3000th career strikeout in his first appearance in nearly a year. Aaron Harang, the opposing pitcher for the Reds, is the victim as the Mets win 10–4 in Cincinnati.
- September 5 – Barry Bonds hits his 762nd and final career home run, an opposite-field shot off Colorado Rockies pitcher Ubaldo Jiménez.
- September 6 – Rick Ankiel's stunning one-month return to baseball as a hitter is mired by controversy when the New York Daily News reports that he purchased 12 months' worth of HGH from a Florida pharmacy from January to December 2004. A few days later, Jay Gibbons of the Orioles is reported to also have received HGH from the same pharmacy. Ankiel did not deny using HGH prior to MLB's official banning of the substance in 2005, stating he used it during that time under the care of a licensed physician.
- September 7 – Curtis Granderson of the Tigers hits his 20th home run of the season, becoming the sixth player in major league history, and the first since 1979, to join the 20–20–20 club, indicating 20 doubles, 20 triples, and 20 home runs in the same season. He ends the season with 38 doubles, 23 triples, and 23 home runs.
- September 8 – The 50th and 51st home runs of the season by Alex Rodriguez are his 48th and 49th as a third baseman. The first breaks his own AL record for the position, while the second breaks the major league record for the position which had stood since 1980 (Mike Schmidt, tied by Adrián Beltré in 2004). Rodriguez's 50th home run also makes him the first player in major league history to collect 50 home runs, 130 runs scored, 130 RBI and 20 stolen bases in a single season (the previous closest player was Larry Walker in 1997, who fell one home run short with 49 HR, 143 runs, 130 RBI and 33 steals).
- September 9:
  - The Milwaukee Brewers open the game with consecutive home runs from Rickie Weeks, J. J. Hardy and Ryan Braun to defeat the Reds 11–5 at Great American Ball Park. Weeks, Hardy and Braun connect off Phil Dumatrait, as the Brewers become only the third team in major league history to open a game with three straight home runs, joining San Diego's Marvell Wynne, Tony Gwynn and John Kruk (April 13, 1987 vs. the San Francisco Giants) and Atlanta's Rafael Furcal, Mark DeRosa and Gary Sheffield (at Cincinnati on May 28, 2003).
  - At Comerica Park, Curtis Granderson collects his 20th stolen base during the first inning of a 14–7 Seattle victory over Detroit. Granderson joins Willie Mays (1957) [26–20–35–38, respectively below] and Frank "Wildfire" Schulte (1911) [30–21–21–23, respectively below] as the only players in major league history with 20 doubles, 20 triples, 20 home runs and 20 stolen bases during a regular season—ending his season with 38 doubles, 23 triples, 23 home runs, and 26 stolen bases.
- September 16:
  - Jim Thome of the White Sox, playing in his 2,000th game, becomes the 23rd player in major league history to reach the 500 home run milestone when he hits a walk-off home run off Dustin Moseley of the Angels to win the game 9–7, making 2007 the first season in history in which three players have hit their 500th homer in the same season. It is also the first time that the 500-homer mark has been reached with a walk-off shot.
  - David Wright of the Mets hits his 30th home run of the season to go with 31 stolen bases, becoming only the fifth player in major league history to become a member of the 30–30 club before the age of 25, in a 10–6 loss to the Phillies.
  - Todd Jones of the Tigers becomes the 21st pitcher in major league history to record 300 saves.
  - Todd Helton hits his 300th career home run.
- September 17 – Frank Thomas of the Blue Jays hits three home runs in a 6–1 win over the Red Sox, tying him for 18th all-time with Ernie Banks and Eddie Mathews with 512. Two of the homers are hit off Tim Wakefield, who gave up all three shots in Thomas' only previous three-homer game in 1996.
- September 18 – Moisés Alou of the Mets, age 41, hits in his 22nd consecutive game, a modern era record for a player over 40.
- September 19 – Andy Pettitte becomes the 110th pitcher to earn 200 major league victories in the Yankees' 2–1 win over the Orioles.
- September 21
  - Barry Bonds announces that his tenure (1993–2007) with the San Francisco Giants has ended, after the team indicates it will not sign him for 2008.
  - Moisés Alou extends his hitting streak to 25 games, breaking the Mets single-season record shared by Mike Piazza and Hubie Brooks. In the same game, the Marlins commit a franchise-high six errors in a 9–6 loss. Eight of the nine runs were unearned as a result of the errors, two of them by Miguel Cabrera. Two days later, Alou surpasses David Wright's overall club mark of 26 games, which spanned two seasons. The streak ends at 30 games on the 26th, a new major league record for a player over 40.
- September 22 – The Boston Red Sox become the first major league team to earn a playoff spot with an 8–6 defeat of the Devil Rays.
- September 23
  - The Cleveland Indians clinch their first American League Central title since 2001 with a 6–2 victory over the Athletics. They are also the first team to clinch a division, as the Red Sox have so far only secured a playoff spot.
  - The Los Angeles Angels clinch the American League West title with a 7–4 victory over the Mariners.
  - In the Yankees' 7–5 win over the Blue Jays, Mike Mussina becomes the first pitcher in major league history to win 250 games without ever winning 20 in a single season.
  - After being home to the Washington Senators from 1961 to 1971 and the Washington Nationals since 2005, Robert F. Kennedy Memorial Stadium hosts its final major league game, a 5–3 Nationals victory over the visiting Phillies before a season-high crowd of 40,519.
- September 25
  - Jimmy Rollins joins David Wright as the second member of 2007's 30–30 club when he leads off the bottom of the first inning with his 30th home run of the season off Braves pitcher Chuck James.
  - Shawn Green gets his 2,000th hit when he singles up the middle off of Nationals pitcher Jason Bergmann.
  - Prince Fielder becomes, at age 23, the youngest player ever to hit 50 home runs after connecting twice in the Brewers' 9–1 victory over the Cardinals. He also becomes part of the first father-son duo to hit 50 home runs in one season, his father Cecil having hit 51 in 1990.
- September 26
  - Cardinals slugger Albert Pujols hits his 32nd home run of the season in the first inning against the Brewers, giving him 100 RBI and making him the first player in major league history to have at least a .300 batting average with 30 homers and 100 RBI in his first seven seasons.
  - Reds second baseman Brandon Phillips homers in the first inning off Juan Gutiérrez of the Astros, making him only the second player at his position to collect 30 home runs and steal 30 bases in the same season. Alfonso Soriano has accomplished the feat three times at the same position. Phillips joins David Wright and Jimmy Rollins as the third member of 2007's 30–30 club.
  - Red Sox third baseman Mike Lowell collects five RBI in an 11–6 Boston victory over the Athletics, raising his total to 116 and setting a new team record for most RBI in a season by a third baseman; Butch Hobson collected 112 RBI in 1977.
  - The New York Yankees secure their 13th consecutive postseason berth with a 12–4 rout of the Devil Rays.
  - Barry Bonds goes 0-for-3 in his final game with the Giants, an 11–3 loss to the visiting Padres.
- September 27 – Phillies first baseman Ryan Howard strikes out for the 196th and 197th times of the season, surpassing Adam Dunn's single-season record of 195 strikeouts in 2004. He ends the season with a new record of 199 strikeouts.
- September 28
  - Jimmy Rollins of the Phillies collects his 705th–709th at bats of the season, breaking Willie Wilson's 1980 single-season record of 705; he ends the season with 716 at bats.
  - The Chicago Cubs clinch the National League Central title with a 6–0 blanking of the Reds.
  - The Boston Red Sox clinch their first American League East title since 1995 and break the Yankees' streak of nine straight division crowns when they defeat the Twins 5–2 and the Bronx Bombers drop a 10–9 decision to the Orioles in 10 innings.
  - In just their tenth year of play, the Arizona Diamondbacks secure a playoff spot for the fourth time in franchise history.
- September 29
  - The Arizona Diamondbacks clinch their fourth National League West title even before taking the field against the Colorado Rockies, when San Diego loses to Milwaukee 4–3.
  - In his second-to-last major league game, Craig Biggio plays at his original position of catcher for the first two innings, playing behind the plate for the first time in 16 years after spending his first four seasons there.
- September 30
  - The New York Mets lose to the Florida Marlins 8–1, completing one of the worst collapses in major league history by squandering a 7-game lead with 17 games remaining in the NL East race, and finish the season one game behind the Philadelphia Phillies, who defeat the Nationals 6–1 to clinch the division title for the first time since 1993.
  - Jimmy Rollins collects his 20th triple of the season, making him the seventh member of the 20–20–20 club and the second new member this year along with Curtis Granderson; this also marks the first time in major league history that two batters record 20–20–20 seasons during the same year. He also becomes the fourth member of the 20–20–20–20 club, as well as the first player in major league history to collect at least 20 doubles, 20 triples, 20 home runs and 40 stolen bases in a single season; this also marks the first time that two players record 20–20–20–20 seasons during the same year (Granderson met the mark earlier in September 2007), and the second time that a batter had a 30–30 season and a 20–20–20–20 season during the same year (Willie Mays accomplished the feat in 1957). Rollins ends the season with 38 doubles, 20 triples, 30 home runs, and 41 stolen bases.
  - Bruce Froemming receives a standing ovation from his Milwaukee hometown crowd prior to working his last regular-season game after a record 37 full seasons as a major league umpire; his final game overall takes place on October 8 in the Indians–Yankees AL Division Series. In the game, the San Diego Padres fail to clinch the NL wild card spot by losing 11–6 to the Milwaukee Brewers. He also extends his record (April 20) for oldest umpire ever in a regular-season game to 68 years, 2 days.

=== October ===
- October 1 – The Colorado Rockies defeat the San Diego Padres 9–8 in 13 innings in the 2007 NL Wild Card tie-breaker to secure the last of the eight MLB playoff spots, completing a run in which they won 14 of their last 15 games, tying the best 15-game finish in major league history. Despite an error in the game, the Rockies also set a major league record for team fielding percentage (.9893), breaking the 2006 Boston Red Sox mark of .9891.
- October 2 – Dmitri Young of the Washington Nationals is named the NL Comeback Player of the Year. Carlos Peña of the Tampa Bay Devil Rays is named the AL Comeback Player of the Year.
- October 18 – After the New York Yankees offer him only a one-year contract at a base salary one-third less than what he earned in 2007, Joe Torre leaves after 12 seasons as manager.
- October 22 – Tony La Russa agrees to a new two-year deal to stay on as manager of the St. Louis Cardinals.
- October 24 – The National Baseball Hall of Fame announces that it will honor Buck O'Neil by establishing a lifetime achievement award in his name. O'Neil, a Negro league first baseman and manager who died in October 2006, will be honored with a statue to be dedicated at the next Hall of Fame induction in Cooperstown, N.Y. After leaving the Negro leagues, O'Neil became the first African American coach in the majors by joining the Cubs staff in 1962, and was later an influential figure in the promotion of baseball and study of Negro leagues history. He was nominated to a special Hall ballot for Negro league players, managers, and executives in 2006, but didn't receive the necessary number of votes to gain admission into the Hall.
- October 28
  - The Boston Red Sox complete a 4–0 sweep of the Colorado Rockies to win the 2007 World Series. The Bosox' Mike Lowell is named Series MVP.
  - During the early innings of Game 4 of the World Series, Scott Boras, the agent for Alex Rodriguez, announces that A-Rod will exercise his option to void the remaining four years of his contract with the Yankees and will become a free agent.
- October 30 – The Yankees sign Joe Girardi to a three-year deal as their new manager. In the meantime, amid rumors that Torre will be hired as the team's new manager, Grady Little resigns as manager of the Los Angeles Dodgers.

=== November ===
- November 1 – The Chunichi Dragons win the 2007 Japan Series over the Hokkaido Nippon Ham Fighters 4–1, losing the first game and sweeping the next four. The Dragons' Norihiro Nakamura is the series MVP. This was a rematch of the 2006 series, won by the Fighters in the same fashion. Game five was a combined perfect game, with starter Daisuke Yamai throwing eight innings, and Hitoki Iwase closing out the ninth. Nippon Professional Baseball does not officially recognize no-hit or perfect games thrown by multiple pitchers.
- November 6:
  - Greg Maddux wins his 17th Gold Glove Award, breaking a record he had previously shared with Jim Kaat and Brooks Robinson.
  - By a vote of 25–5, major league general managers endorse the use of instant replay for the first time, with the condition that its scope be limited to determining where a potential home run ball left the park or the possibility of fan interference on a home run.
- November 8:
  - General managers decide to mandate head protection for first- and third-base coaches during games, starting in 2008. This was prompted by the death on July 22 of minor-league first-base coach Mike Coolbaugh of the Tulsa Drillers, a Double-A affiliate of the Colorado Rockies, who was hit in the neck by a foul line drive, killing him on impact.
  - The Tampa Bay Devil Rays officially drop the "Devil" from their name, becoming the Tampa Bay Rays. In addition to the name change, they also change their colors from green and black to navy blue, Columbia blue, and gold, and design new uniforms that will be worn starting in 2008.
- November 9 – Italy handed the U.S. team their only loss in Team USA's route to win the 2007 Baseball World Cup in Taiwan. It was the U.S.'s first loss to Italy in 21 years and the first time it ever lost to Italy with professional players, as the team consisted of Major League Baseball players and top minor league prospects.
- November 12:
  - Ryan Braun of the Milwaukee Brewers edges Troy Tulowitzki of the Colorado Rockies in the closest balloting since 1980 (128–126) for the NL Rookie of the Year Award. Dustin Pedroia of the Boston Red Sox is a clear choice in the AL.
  - The New York Yankees re-sign catcher Jorge Posada for $52.4 million over four years. This makes Posada the highest-paid catcher in MLB history, edging out Mike Piazza's $13 million average from 1999 to 2005.
- November 15:
  - San Diego Padres pitcher Jake Peavy wins the NL Cy Young Award by unanimous vote.
  - Alex Rodriguez agrees to an outline of a deal with the New York Yankees (10 years, $275 million, with extra money if he breaks the career home run record with the Yankees. In total the deal could reach $300 million.)
- November 16 – Barry Bonds is indicted on charges of perjury and obstructing justice.
- November 19 – Just four days after agreeing to his new contract with the New York Yankees, Alex Rodriguez wins his 3rd career AL Most Valuable Player Award.
- November 20 – Philadelphia Phillies shortstop Jimmy Rollins wins the NL Most Valuable Player Award.
- November 26 – The Lotte Giants hire Jerry Royster as their new manager. Royster, a former major league player and longtime minor league manager, is the first foreigner ever hired to manage a team in the Korea Baseball Organization. Another Lotte-owned team, the Chiba Lotte Marines, of Nippon Pro Baseball, had had their best run ever thanks to an American manager, Bobby Valentine.

=== December ===
- December 4 – The Florida Marlins and Detroit Tigers strike a blockbuster deal. Florida sends Miguel Cabrera and Dontrelle Willis to Detroit for Burke Badenhop, Eulogio De La Cruz, Cameron Maybin, Andrew Miller, Mike Rabelo, and Dallas Trahern.
- December 13 – Former U.S. Senator George J. Mitchell releases his long-awaited (409-page) report, 20 months in the making at an estimated cost of $40 million, on use of performance-enhancing drugs in baseball, naming 89 current and former players. MLB Commissioner Bud Selig and Players Association Executive Director Donald Fehr replied with their own separate statements later in the day.
- December 28 – Retired major league catcher Jim Leyritz drove his sport utility vehicle through a red light in Fort Lauderdale, Florida, crashing into Fredia Ann Veitch's car and killing her. Blood-test results showed Leyritz's blood alcohol content three hours after the crash was 0.14 percent, above Florida's legal limit of 0.08.

== Media ==
- American Pastime
- Bronx Is Burning, The
- Final Season, The
- Sandlot 3

== Deaths ==
=== January ===
- January 1 – Ernie Koy, 97, well-traveled outfielder who played with the Brooklyn Dodgers from 1938 to 1939 before joining the St. Louis Cardinals (1940–41), Cincinnati Reds (1941–42) and Philadelphia Phillies (1942), compiling a .279/.332/.427 line and 36 home runs in 558 games, including a homer in his first major league at-bat, whose career finished when entered military service during World War II.
- January 4 – Bob Milliken, 80, pitcher for the Brooklyn Dodgers in the 1953 and 1954 seasons; later a longtime St. Louis Cardinals coach and instructor.
- January 9 – Ben Callahan, 49, pitcher who worked in four games for the 1983 Oakland Athletics.
- January 16 – Betty Trezza, 81, infielder who batted a historic 14th inning, RBI-single to give the Racine Belles the 1946 AAGPBL championship title.
- January 19 – Wilfred "Lefty" Lefebvre, 91, pitcher for the Boston Red Sox and Washington Senators in four seasons spanning 1938 to 1944; later a longtime Red Sox scout.
- January 20 – Vern Ruhle, 55, pitcher who played for the Detroit Tigers, Houston Astros, Cleveland Indians and California Angels during 13 seasons from 1974 to 1986, posting notable starts for Houston in the 1980–1981 playoffs; became a reliable pitching coach for four National League teams over nine seasons between 1997 and 2006; pitching coach of Cincinnati Reds at the time of his death.
- January 23 – Dick Joyce, 63, pitcher for the 1965 Kansas City Athletics.
- January 25 – Jack Lang, 85, sportswriter for New York area newspapers from 1946 to 1989, and also longtime BBWAA official who was responsible for notifying Hall of Famers of their election from 1966 to 1988.
- January 27 – Bing Devine, 90, general manager of the St. Louis Cardinals (1957–1964; 1968–1978) who built St. Louis' NL pennant winners of 1964 and 1967–1968, and as president of the New York Mets (1966–1967) helped construct 1969 "Miracle Mets".
- January 29 – Art Fowler, 84, pitcher for the Cincinnati Redlegs, Los Angeles Dodgers and Los Angeles Angels over nine seasons spanning 1954–1964, before becoming a pitching coach for five teams under manager Billy Martin in fourteen seasons from 1969 to 1988.
- January 30 – Max Lanier, 91, two-time All-Star pitcher who won 45 games and posted a very solid 2.47 earned run average from 1942 to 1944 for the St. Louis Cardinals, leading the National League in ERA in 1943, while winning three consecutive NL pennants and two World Series rings in 1942 and 1944, including the final game of the 1944 Classic; one of the most prominent American players to "jump" his MLB contract (and its reserve clause) to play in outlaw Mexican League in 1946, for which he was suspended from Organized Baseball for over three years; father of Hal Lanier.

=== February ===
- February 1 – Ray Berres, 99, catcher for four NL teams from 1934 to 1945, later a White Sox pitching coach for nearly two decades.
- February 4 – Steve Barber, 68, All-Star pitcher for the Orioles who in 1963 became the first 20-game winner in modern Baltimore history.
- February 4 – Jim Pisoni, 77, outfielder, the last player to debut in a St. Louis Browns uniform, who also played for the Kansas City Athletics, Milwaukee Braves and New York Yankees.
- February 6 – Lew Burdette, 80, All-Star pitcher for the Braves who was MVP of the 1957 World Series, led NL with 21 wins in 1959; also pitched for Yankees, Cardinals, Cubs and Angels.
- February 7 – Josephine Lenard, 85, All-Star outfielder who played ten seasons in the AAGPBL
- February 9 – Hank Bauer, 84, three-time All-Star right fielder for the New York Yankees, being a member of seven World Series champion teams between 1949 and 1966, who later managed the Baltimore Orioles to the 1966 World Series title.
- February 15 – Terry Enyart, 56, pitcher who appeared in two games for the 1974 Montreal Expos.
- February 15 – Buddy Hancken, 92, catcher for the 1940 Philadelphia Athletics; later a minor league manager and MLB scout, coach and executive.
- February 18 – Danny Reynolds, 87, infielder for the 1945 Chicago White Sox.
- February 20 – Bob Malloy, 88, pitcher who played for the Cincinnati Reds and St. Louis Browns in a span of five seasons between 1943 and 1949, one of many ballplayers whose career was interrupted during World War conflict.
- February 20 – Casey Wise, 74, infielder who played for the Chicago Cubs, Milwaukee Braves and Detroit Tigers over four seasons from 1957 to 1960.
- February 21 – Sherman Jones, nicknamed "Roadblock", 72, pitcher for the San Francisco Giants, Cincinnati Reds and New York Mets in three seasons from 1960 to 1962, who also appeared in the 1961 World Series with Cincinnati and later served as a Kansas legislator for twelve years.

=== March ===
- March 2 – Clem Labine, 80, two-time All-Star relief pitcher who played from 1950 through 1962, winning three World Series rings with the 1955 Brooklyn Dodgers, the 1959 Los Angeles Dodgers, and the 1960 Pittsburgh Pirates, as well as National League pennants with Brooklyn in 1953 and in 1956, ending his career with the 1962 expansion New York Mets.
- March 3 – Gene Oliver, 71, catcher and first baseman for five teams in the 1960s who hit 21 home runs for the 1965 Milwaukee Braves.
- March 7 – Emil Mailho, 97, outfielder for the 1936 Philadelphia Athletics.
- March 8 – John Vukovich, 59, third baseman for three teams, mainly for the Philadelphia Phillies from 1970 to 1981, coaching later for them during 17 seasons.
- March 10 – Art Lopatka, 87, pitcher who played with the St. Louis Cardinals in 1945 and for the Philadelphia Phillies in 1946.
- March 10 – Bobby Sturgeon, 87, middle infielder for the Chicago Cubs and Boston Braves in part of six seasons spanning 1940–1948, one of many big leaguers whose career was interrupted during World War II.
- March 12 – Norm Larker, 76, All-Star first baseman for Los Angeles Dodgers (1958–1961), runner-up to Dick Groat in 1960 NL batting race, and member of the original (1962) Houston Colt .45s squad.
- March 15 – Bowie Kuhn, 80, Commissioner of Baseball from 1969 to 1984 whose tenure saw strong increases in attendance, the arrival of free agency, and the sport's first labor strikes.
- March 15 – Marty Martínez, 65, utility infielder for six teams from 1962 to 1972; became a coach and scout for the Mariners.
- March 22 – Don Dennis, 65, relief pitcher for the St. Louis Cardinals from 1965 to 1966, who was named St. Louis rookie of the year in 1965.
- March 22 – Willard Schmidt, 78, pitcher for the St. Louis Cardinals (1952–1957) and Cincinnati Reds (1958–1959).
- March 23 – Ed Bailey, 75, six-time All-Star and power hitting catcher, whose 14-year career include a nine-year stint with the Cincinnati Reds from 1953 to 1961, who, like other catchers of his generation, was overshadowed by Yogi Berra and Roy Campanella.
- March 31 – Patricia Barringer, 82, All-American Girls Professional Baseball League player and manager.

=== April ===
- April 1 – Herb Carneal, 83, broadcaster for the Minnesota Twins since their second season in 1962, who previously called games in Philadelphia both for the Athletics and Phillies, and later for the Baltimore Orioles.
- April 1 – Lou Limmer, 82, first baseman who hit the last home run for the Philadelphia Athletics and had the last hit in their final game in Philadelphia.
- April 6 – Ed Bahr, 87, Canadian pitcher who played for the Pittsburgh Pirates from 1946 to 1947.
- April 10 – Dick Kryhoski, 82, first baseman for four American League teams in six seasons 1949 to 1955, as well one of few players to play for the St. Louis Browns in its 1953 final season and for the Baltimore Orioles in their 1954 inaugural campaign.
- April 15 – Chip Marshall, 87, catcher for the 1941 St. Louis Cardinals.
- April 16 – Jean Marlowe, 77, pitcher in the All-American Girls Professional Baseball League between the 1948 and 1954 seasons.
- April 23 – Otis Davis, 87, utility man for the 1946 Brooklyn Dodgers.
- April 23 – David Halberstam, 73, Pulitzer-winning author and historian, who wrote three non-fiction books on baseball: Summer of '49, October, 1964 and The Teammates.
- April 23 – Sammy Meeks, 84, backup infielder who played for the Washington Senators and Cincinnati Reds over four seasons from 1948 to 1951.
- April 27 – Ralph McLeod, 90, outfielder for the 1938 Boston Bees.
- April 28 – Archie Wilson, 83, 1951 International League MVP, who later played from 1951 to 1952 for the New York Yankees, Washington Senators and Boston Red Sox.
- April 29 – Milt Bocek, 94, outfielder for the 1933 and 1934 Chicago White Sox.
- April 29 – Josh Hancock, 29, relief pitcher who played from 2002 through 2007 for the Boston Red Sox, Philadelphia Phillies, Cincinnati Reds and St. Louis Cardinals, being also a member of the 2006 World Series Champion Cardinals team.

=== May ===
- May 13 – Gomer Hodge, 63, infielder for the 1971 Cleveland Indians, who later coached in Minor League Baseball and managed in the Mexican Pacific League.
- May 17 – Bill Wight, 85, pitcher for eight teams between 1946 and 1958, who won 15 games for the 1949 Chicago White Sox.
- May 25 – Elaine Roth, 78, AAGPBL pitcher and outfielder.
- May 28 – Phyllis Koehn, 84, AAGPBL pitcher.

=== June ===
- June 4 – Clete Boyer, 70, Gold Glove third baseman who played for the Kansas City Athletics, New York Yankees and Atlanta Braves over 15 seasons spanning 1955–1971, winning five consecutive American League pennants with the Yankees from 1960 to 1964, and a Gold Glove Award with the Braves in 1969; brothers Ken and Cloyd played in the majors.
- June 15 – Larry Whiteside, 69, pioneering African American journalist known for his coverage of baseball for newspapers in Milwaukee and Boston.
- June 23 – Rod Beck, 38, three-time All-Star relief pitcher who played from 1991 through 2001 for the San Francisco Giants, Chicago Cubs, Boston Red Sox and San Diego Padres, winning the 1994 NL Rolaids Relief Man Award with the Giants, while setting franchise season records with 24 consecutive saves and 48 overall in its 1993 season.

=== July ===
- July 7 – Miguel Sotelo, 74, Mexican Baseball Hall of Fame pitcher and manager who spent more than 25 years in professional baseball, pitching no-hitters in the Arizona–Mexico League and the Mexican League, compiling an overall pitching record of 287–221 in eleven seasons and later managing during 27 seasons, while guiding the Broncos de Reynosa to their only Mexican League championship in the 1969 campaign, defeating the Sultanes de Monterrey.
- July 11 – Shag Crawford, 90, umpire for 3,082 National League games between 1956 and 1975, who also worked in three World Series, two NL Championship Series, and three All-Star Games, and was the father of NL umpire Jerry Crawford.
- July 16 – Carl McNabb, 90, who played briefly for the Detroit Tigers in 1945.
- July 18 – Orlando McFarlane, 69, catcher for the Pittsburgh Pirates, Detroit Tigers and California Angels over five seasons spanning 1962–1968.
- July 19 – Jim Mangan, 77, catcher for the Brooklyn Dodgers in its 1946 season.
- July 22 – Rollie Stiles, 100, pitcher for the St. Louis Browns in three seasons from 1930 to 1933, the last living person to have pitched to Babe Ruth, and also the oldest living former MLB player at the time of his death.
- July 22 – Mike Coolbaugh, 35, third baseman (and brother of Scott Coolbaugh) for the Milwaukee Brewers and St. Louis Cardinals in 2001 and 2002; as a coach in the minor leagues, he died when a line drive struck him in the neck as he was standing in the first-base coach's box; professional baseball mandated that base coaches wear helmets as a result.
- July 29 – Bill Robinson, 64, outfielder who played 1966 through 1983 for the Atlanta Braves, New York Yankees, Pittsburgh Pirates and Philadelphia Phillies, collecting three World Series rings as a player for the 1979 Pirates, and as a coach for both the 1986 New York Mets and 2003 Florida Marlins.

=== August ===
- August 1 – Pete Naktenis, 93, pitcher who played with the Philadelphia Athletics in 1936 and for the Cincinnati Reds between in 1939.
- August 3 – Lee Griffeth, 82, pitcher for the 1946 Philadelphia Athletics.
- August 4 – Frank Mancuso, 89, catcher who played with the St. Louis Browns in three seasons from 1944 to 1946 and for the Washington Senators in 1947; member of Browns' 1944 American League championship team; later, served on the Houston City Council from 1963 to 1993; brother of Gus Mancuso.
- August 5 – Al Salerno, 76, American League umpire from 1961 to 1968 who worked 1,110 league games and the 1964 Major League Baseball All-Star Game; abruptly fired on September 16, 1968, he and colleague Bill Valentine filed suit alleging they were singled out for attempts to form an umpires' union for their league.
- August 7 – Hank Morgenweck, 78, American League umpire from 1972 to 1975 who also worked second base in Game 1 of the 1970 NLCS as a strike replacement.
- August 7 – Mary Rountree, 85, top-notch catcher who played from 1946 through 1952 in the All-American Girls Professional Baseball League.
- August 13 – Ox Miller, 92, pitcher who hurled in 24 total games for the Washington Senators, St. Louis Browns and Chicago Cubs over four seasons between 1943 and 1947.
- August 14 – Phil Rizzuto, 89, Hall of Fame shortstop who won thirteen American League pennants and seven World Series during his thirteen-season career with the New York Yankees, earning 1950 American League MVP Award honors and three MLB All-Star Game selections, and later broadcasting Yankees games on radio and television during four decades.
- August 15 – Sam Pollock, 81, legendary Canadian hockey executive of the 1960s and 1970s (Montreal Canadiens) who later was chairman and CEO of MLB's Toronto Blue Jays between 1995 and 2000.
- August 17 – Chico García, 82, Mexican Baseball Hall of Fame second baseman who played for the 1954 Baltimore Orioles, while winning batting titles in the Arizona–Texas League in 1963 and the Mexican League in 1963, before managing in the ML from 1965 to 1976.
- August 17 – Dee Sanders, 86, pitcher for the St. Louis Browns in its 1945 season.
- August 20 – Wild Bill Hagy, 68, popular fan noted for leading cheers at Baltimore Orioles games in the 1970s and 1980s.
- August 23 – Bobby Herrera, 81, Mexican pitcher who played in 1951 for the St. Louis Browns.
- August 26 – Chuck Comiskey, 81, vice president of the Chicago White Sox in the 1950s, as well as the last member of the Comiskey dynasty to be involved in the club's operation.
- August 29 – Margie Lang, 83, infielder and pitcher who played in the All-American Girls Professional Baseball League.
- August 30 – Hal Jeffcoat, 82, outfielder and pitcher for the Chicago Cubs, Cincinnati Redlegs/Reds and St. Louis Cardinals during twelve seasons from 1948 to 1959.

=== September ===
- September 1 – Mel Roberts, 64, first-base coach of the 1992–1995 Philadelphia Phillies, including 1993 NL champions; minor league outfielder, coach and manager who spent 46 years in pro ball.
- September 6 – Al Kozar, 86, second baseman who played for the Washington Senators and Chicago White Sox over a three-year career from 1950 to 1952.
- September 12 – Lou Kretlow, 86, pitcher who played from 1946 through 1956 with the Detroit Tigers, St. Louis Browns, Baltimore Orioles, Chicago White Sox and Kansas City Athletics.
- September 20 – John Sullivan, 86, shortstop who played for the Washington Senators and St. Louis Browns over six seasons spanning 1942–1949.
- September 22 – Bill Harman, 88, pitcher and catcher who played for the Philadelphia Phillies in its 1941 season.

=== October ===
- October 3 – Bunky Stewart, 76, pitcher for the Washington Senators over five seasons from 1952 to 1956.
- October 4 – Don Nottebart, 71, pitcher whose major league career included stints with five different clubs between 1960 and 1969, who pitched the first no-hitter in Houston Colt .45s/Astros history on May 17, 1963, though he has the dubious distinction of yielding the first grand slam of the 1961 season, and delivering Willie Mays' 500th home run in 1965.
- October 6 – Nancy DeShone, 75, outfielder who played for the South Bend Blue Sox of the All-American Girls Professional Baseball League in 1948.
- October 14 – Fred Bruckbauer, 69, pitcher for the 1969 Minnesota Twins.
- October 14 – Owen Friend, 80, middle infielder and third baseman for the St. Louis Browns, Detroit Tigers, Cleveland Indians, Boston Red Sox and Chicago Cubs in a span of five seasons from 1955 to 1956.
- October 17 – Billy Berroa, 79, Spanish-language broadcaster for the New York Mets, who began announcing major league games in 1963.
- October 17 – Mickey Rutner, 86, third baseman for the 1947 Philadelphia Athletics.
- October 23 – Don Nicholas, 76, shortstop for the Chicago White Sox in the 1952 and 1954 seasons.

=== November ===
- November 9 – Lorraine Fisher, 79, AAGPBL pitcher for the Rockford Peaches and Grand Rapids Chicks.
- November 13 – Kazuhisa Inao, 70, Japanese Baseball Hall of Fame pitcher for the Nishitetsu Lions, who won the Pacific League MVP Award in 1957 and 1958 and posted a 42–14 record in 1961.
- November 15 – Joe Nuxhall, 79, two-time All-Star pitcher who became the youngest man ever to play in the major leagues – a mark he still holds, when he debuted as a 15-year-old with the Cincinnati Reds on June 10, 1944, while pitching for Cincinnati nine more seasons from 1952 to 1960, and remaining in the Reds organization on a second career as a member of the broadcast team, as he called the Reds games including those with which they won the World Series in the 1975, 1976 and 1990, ending his baseball career in 2004, over 60 years after his professional pitching debut.
- November 22 – Ken Wood, 83, outfielder for the St. Louis Browns, Boston Red Sox and Washington Senators during six seasons from 1948 to 1953.
- November 23 – Joe Kennedy, 28, pitcher for five teams since 2001, most recently with the Blue Jays; posted a 9–7 mark with a 3.66 ERA for the 2004 Rockies.
- November 23 – Al Yates, 62, backup outfielder for the 1971 Milwaukee Brewers.
- November 27 – Clancy Smyres, 85, pinch hitter in five appearances with the Brooklyn Dodgers in its 1944 season.
- November 28 – Bob Marquis, 83, backup outfielder who played for the 1953 Cincinnati Redlegs.

=== December ===
- December 14 – Cuddles Marshall, 82, pitcher for the New York Yankees and St. Louis Browns between 1946 and 1950, who was the Yankees pitcher to start the first night game at Yankee Stadium on May 28, 1946.
- December 17 – Don Chevrier, 68, Canadian television broadcaster for the Toronto Blue Jays during 20 years, who also spanned The World of Sports variety show for CBC Sports for more than 30 years.
- December 20 – Tommy Byrne, 87, All-Star pitcher for four American League teams who earned 72 of his 85 major league victories with the New York Yankees, including three 15-win seasons for pennant winners, earning two World Series with New York in 1949 and 1956.
- December 21 – Jack Lamabe, 71, pitcher from 1962 to 1968 for seven major league teams, mainly with the Boston Red Sox.
- December 25 – Jim Beauchamp, 68, outfielder and first baseman for seven major league teams from 1963 to 1974, who later managed in the minor league manager from 1975 to 1990 and coached in the major leagues from 1991 to 1998.
- December 26 – Jim Castiglia, 89, catcher for the 1942 Philadelphia Athletics, also a running back in the NFL and AAFC.

== See also ==
- 2007 Nippon Professional Baseball season
- 2007 Korea Professional Baseball season
- 2007 Chinese Professional Baseball League season
