= Justin Prinstein =

American professional baseball player (born 1984)

- Born: February 4, 1984 (age 42); Detroit, Michigan

Justin Prinstein (born February 4, 1984), nicknamed "Boomer", is an American former professional baseball player, coach, and scout. He played in the Israel Baseball League in 2007 and other international leagues before becoming a scout in 2013.

== Playing career ==
Prinstein played college baseball for Albion College then the George Washington Colonials and continued as a professional in Belgium, Israel, Australia, Netherlands, Germany, Hungary, and the Czech Republic. In 2007, he pitched a no-hitter in his first professional start with the Hoboken Pioneers in Belgium and then moved on to the sole season of the Israel Baseball League (IBL), pitching for the Netanya Tigers. He was named to the North All-Star team as a pitcher, and hit .318 as a designated hitter.

Prinstein played winter ball in Adelaide, Australia, for Southern Districts in the South Australia Baseball League, where he was a teammate of Adam Crabb, a fellow IBL All-Star for Tel Aviv Lightning.

In 2008, Prinstein pitched and hit for the Tex Town Tigers in the Dutch First Division. The following season, in 2009, Prinstein signed as starting pitcher for Almere'90 in the Netherlands. The team won promotion following a five-game final, with Prinstein getting the win in relief of Game 5. In 2010, he returned to Almere to pitch in the Honkball Hoofdklasse.

Prinstein transferred to the Hamburg Stealers in the German Bundesliga for the last two weekends of the 2010 season (2 starts, 1–1 record), helping the club reach the playoffs, where he was ineligible to pitch due to the late transfer. He returned to Hamburg the following summer but was released after the first half of the season. Prinstein finished the year pitching and hitting for the Janossomorja Rascals in the European Intra-League with other European standouts , Sam Boone and Ty Eriksen.

In the 2009–2010 winter, Prinstein returned to Australia and pitched for the West Stirling Indians in the Western Australian state league competition.

In addition to his playing career, Prinstein has coached with the Hungary national team beginning in 2011. In 2012, he became head coach, and was a Coach of the Year finalist in the European Baseball Coaches Association voting. Connected to his work in Hungary, he has supported the Janossomorja Rascals of the Hungarian league as a coach and player, helping them to multiple Hungarian League final appearances and Hungarian Cup championships between 2011 and 2013.

Prinstein was head coach and a starting pitcher of Hroši Brno in the Czech Extraliga in 2013. He ended his playing career in 2014.

Beginning in 2013, Prinstein began organizing and coaching the International Stars team that won 6 Prague Baseball Week championships during a 7-year span from 2013 - 2019 . Prinstein also extended his coaching duties to the South Australian State League in 2016 - 2017 winter season for the Port Adelaide Magpies as associate head coach with Chris Sims helping them reach the Division 1 championship led by former MLB pitcher Jack O'Loughlin, Adam Crabb and imports Alex Carter and Dylan Brammer.

== Scouting career ==
Prinstein has worked as a Major League Baseball (MLB) scout for multiple clubs. He started in Europe for the Houston Astros from 2009 - 2010 while he was playing in the Dutch League and then the Baltimore Orioles from 2013 - 2018, as an international scout and as a Pro Scout helping the team win the playoff series vs Detroit in 2014, and helping bring in waiver claims and Rule 5 picks such as Miguel Castro, Paul Fry, Anthony Santander, and Ritchie Martin. From 2019 until 2023, he was an international crosschecker for the Cincinnati Reds. Helping discover or sign notable international prospects such as Alfriedo Duno, Carlos Sanchez, Nicolo Pinazzi, Drew Davies, and Iker Redona. From 2024 through 2025 Prinstein scouted in the KBO helping tow different teams win two championships, first 2024 with the Kia Tigers he scouted Eric Lauer and in 2025 with the LG Twins where he was responsible for finding Anders Tolhurst. He was falsely accused of recording a Colorado Rockies coach on his cellphone in a story published in July 2026 with no named sources , in which no investigation or wrongdoing was found by MLB, and he was not terminated by the California Angels. Over the years Prinstein has been a featured contributor to Baseball America, Baseball Prospectus and other podcasts.

== Community Work ==
In 2012, Prinstein began the International Stars program that helped numerous young players have an opportunity to play college baseball and through the non-profit Detroit Baseball Academy has helped hundreds of Detroit youth play year-round baseball for free. According to his LinkedIn, he currently attends the Arizona State University School of Social Work.

== Personal life ==
Prinstein is an alumnus of University of Detroit Law School and a relative of Olympic gold medalist track and field athlete Myer Prinstein. He is also known as DJ Boomer , a vinyl DJ in the Phoenix music scene with residencies at Valley Bar, Canal Club, Sauvage, The Womack, and with the collective Valley Vinyl Club at The Dirty Drummer
