= Scott Perlman (baseball) =

American baseball player

Scott Perlman (born January 12, 1967, in New York City, New York), is a former professional baseball player, and served as a starter/relief pitcher for the Bet Shemesh Blue Sox in the Israel Baseball League. He batted and threw righthanded.

As a professional, Perlman played one season for the Blue Sox and finished the 2007 season 3–2 with 1 save, and allowed only 1 of 13 inherited runners to score, which led the league. Perlman also served as the team's pitching and third base coach under manager Ron Blomberg and interim manager Eric Holtz, helping to lead the Blue Sox to the IBL Championship in the league's inaugural season. He was selected to represent the Blue Sox as a member of the 2007 All-Star team. Perlman, along with several members of the Israel Baseball League appeared in the documentary film Holy Land Hardball, chronicling the formation of the first professional baseball league in the Middle East.

== Baseball ==
Perlman attended the Hackley School in Tarrytown, New York. According to the 1984 Hackley Yearbook, Perlman finished his senior year with a .561 batting average and a 4–2 record as a pitcher. He was named team MVP, and was selected to the All Ivy League team.

Perlman played three seasons of NCAA baseball for the Union College Union Dutchmen, where he was 4–0 with 1 save as a reliever and spot starter. In 1987 he was a member of the Dutchmen team that set the then-school record for wins, and won the ECAC division III championship.

Perlman began his post-graduate career in the Westchester Baseball Association for Burt's Bombers, then later for the Greenburgh Athletics and Eastchester Monarchs. He performed for 19 seasons as a member of the Pleasantville Red Sox in the Westchester Rockland Wood Bat League, the oldest all-wood bat league in Westchester County, New York. Perlman appeared in seven WRWBL All-Star games over his career, and 15 in his Red Sox career. He finished with a record of 125–34 with 1112 strikeouts, 187 walks, and a lifetime ERA of 1.81. In all, Perlman appeared as a pitcher in 214 games for Pleasantville since beginning in 1991, and left with the most wins of any pitcher in the WRWBL since the league changed from metal to a wood bat format in 1999 (56–21). His list of personal accolades includes earning two defensive awards for fielding on the mound, winning the league's ERA title on six separate occasions, posting the most wins of any pitcher in 1992-1996 and 2002 and leading the league in strikeouts in 1992, 1994-1997 and 2000. He was a five-time league champion in 1994, 1996, 1997, 1999 and 2000 winning the Championship Most Outstanding Player in 2000 for his two wins in that series. His number #24 was retired by the Red Sox in 2009. Perlman was selected to enter the Westchester Rockland Baseball Hall of Fame in 2010.

In 2008 Perlman signed with the Kensico Mud Hens in the Hutchinson River Baseball League. He was selected to the All-Star team in 2016 at age 49. As a member of the Mud Hens he was part of four league championship teams in 2009, 2010, 2012 and 2013. In 2017, Perlman signed with a Westchester Lumberjacks of the Hudson Valley NABA which went on to win 9 league championships.

== Personal life ==
On August 26, 1995, Perlman married Nancy Meyer and had two boys, Devin and Justin Perlman before the couple divorced in 2014. He married Kim Riggi Ilie of Pearl River, New York, on August 12, 2017. Kim Perlman has three boys, Brandon, Brayden, and Brett, and a daughter Mia from a previous marriage. Perlman resides in Pearl River, New York, and is a retired special education teacher in the Mount Vernon, New York City School District in Westchester County, New York

== Career stats ==
Year	Team	G	GS	IP	R	ER	H	2B	3B	HR	BB	SO	CG	W	L	SV	ERA	SHO	WHIP
Career Stats	NCAA/Union College DIII	13	2	39	17	14	33	5	0	0	17	31	0	4	0	1	3.23	0	1.28
Career Stats	Greenburgh Athletics/Eastchester Monarchs- WBA	74	41	247.7	79	63	241	25	5	7	47	223	15	37	19	10	2.28	3	1.16
Career Stats	Pleasantville Red Sox - WRWBL	214	166	1230.3	314	248	976	51	13	22	187	1112	45	126	36	7	1.81	17	0.94
Career Stats	Kensico Mud Hens/Mount Vernon Lumberjacks - HVBL	91	66	457	162	115	401	55	7	12	120	421	31	57	12	5	2.26	5	1.14
Career Stats	Bet Shemesh Blue Sox - IBL	13	3	30	23	19	35	0	0	8	8	19	0	3	2	2	5.70	0	1.43
