= Bet Shemesh Blue Sox =

Israeli baseball team

- בית שמש בלו סוקס
- [[File: |frameless|class=pageimage|alt=]] Logo

Information
- League: Israel Baseball League
- Location: (Israel) Bet Shemesh
- Ballpark: Kibbutz Gezer Field
- Founded: 2006
- League championships: 1
- Colors: Blue
- Manager: (United States) Ron Blomberg

Current uniforms
Home	Away

The Beit Shemesh Blue Sox (Hebrew: בית שמש בלו סוקס) were an Israeli baseball team from Bet Shemesh.

The Blue Sox was one of the inaugural teams in the Israel Baseball League. They had the best regular season record (29–12, .707), and won the inaugural championship August 19, 2007, in Petah Tikva, shutting out Art Shamsky’s Modi’in Miracle 3–0 in the championship game. Californian RHP Rafael Bergstrom pitched a complete game shutout, downing Dominican RHP Maximo Nelson (5–3, 3.55 ERA) who pitched for Modi’in.

== History ==

On February 26, 2007, it was announced that former Major League Baseball player Ron Blomberg would be the manager of the Blue Sox. Team colors also reflect Blomberg's stint with the New York Yankees, and hopes that league officials had of creating a rivalry between Art Shamsky's Modi'in Miracle (similar colors to the New York Mets) and the Blue Sox.

The first player selected by the Blue Sox in the inaugural draft was Canadian right handed pitcher Jason Benson.

== Stadium ==
Located at Kibbutz Gezer, Gezer Field was home to the Blue Sox as well as the Modi'in Miracle, as neither city has a baseball stadium. However, a new field was under construction in Bet Shemesh and reportedly would have been ready for the second season in 2008, which was never played.

== Logo ==
The Blue Sox logo is a mixture of the logos of the Chicago White Sox and the New York Yankees, and its letters make out the initials of the city of Bet Shemesh, written in diagonal from right to left (because the Hebrew language reads from right to left), as opposed to the White Sox which goes left to right.

== Roster ==
Bet Shemesh Blue Sox roster
Active (25-man) roster		Coaches/Other
Starting rotation: 10 (United States) Ben Pincus; 11 (Dominican Republic) Juan Feliciano; 23 (United States) Jason Benson; 54 (United States) Rafael Bergstrom; Bullpen: 2 (Israel) Alon Leichman; 17 (United States) Aryeh Rosenbaum; 18 (Israel) Jeff Mor; Closer: 24 (United States) Scott Perlman; † 15-day disabled list Roster updated 08.03.2007; Transactions	Catchers: 5 (Israel) Lukas Brenowitz; 14 (United States) Scott Jarmakowicz; 19 (United States) Jake Ayers; Infielders: 6 (United States) Jim Pierce; 7 (United States) Gregg Raymundo; 9 (United States) David Kramer; 15 (United States) Eric Holtz; 20 (United States) Johnny Lopez; Outfielders: 3 (United States) Sean Slaughter; 4 (Canada) Justin Cardinal; 8 (United States) Mike Lyons; 21 (United States) Alan Gardner; 25 (Australia) Jason Rees; Designated hitters: Currently unknown	Manager: 12 (United States) Ron Blomberg; Coaches: 15 (United States) Eric Holtz; 24 (United States) Scott Perlman; 36 (United States) Michael Rollhaus; Suspended list: Currently vacant

== Team success ==
The Blue Sox jumped off to a good start in the beginning of the inaugural 2007 season, winning 9 consecutive game before finally losing one to the Tel Aviv Lightning. The team played well for the rest of the season, taking first place in the regular season, as well as winning the championship game on August 19, 2007, in front of 2,610 fans.

The team was the best offensive team in the league, coming in first in the following categories: batting average (.294), runs (286), hits (325), doubles (61), home runs (60), runs batted in (251), and stolen bases (115). 23-year-old Australian right fielder Jason Rees led the league with 17 home runs and 50 runs batted in in 130 at bats. Shortstop Gregg Raymundo, who hit .292 in 7 minor league seasons and played for the Texas Rangers' and Pittsburgh Pirates' AAA teams, was a close second for the league title in batting, with a .459 batting average. Jason Rees was signed to a minor league contract by the New York Yankees for the 2008 season.

One of the leading pitchers was Juan Feliciano of Bet Shemesh, who had pitched for the 2005-06 Hiroshima Carp in Japan. He was 7–1, with a 1.97 ERA, and in 50.1 innings gave up only 28 hits while striking out 73. Rafael Bergstrom was 7–2, with a 2.44 ERA.

The Commissioner's Award for Distinguished Service was awarded to shortstop Eric Holtz of Bet Shemesh, a player-coach who also filled in as player-manager.

Three players from the Blue Sox won season awards for outstanding play: Raymundo shared the Hank Greenberg Most Valuable Player award (along with Eladio Rodriguez of the Modi'in Miracle), Juan Feliciano was named the best pitcher, and Jason Rees received two awards: Best Outfielder (shared with Josh Doane of the Netanya Tigers) and Home Run Champion (17).

The Blue Sox had 11 players named to the 2007 All-Star Team: Scott Jarmakowicz (C), Gregg Raymundo (SS), David Kramer (2B), Sean Slaughter (OF), Jason Reese (OF), Johnny Lopez (DH), Rafael Bergstrom (P), Ben Pincus (P), Scott Perlman (P), Juan Feliciano (P), and Jason Benson (P). Manager for the North team was Blue Sox manager Eric Holtz, and the North defeated the South 5–4.
