= Holy Land Hardball =

- Theatrical release poster
- Directed by: Brett Rapkin; Erik Kesten
- Produced by: Brett Rapkin; Erik Kesten
- Starring: Ken Holtzman; Art Shamsky; Ron Blomberg
- Edited by: Brett Rapkin; Erik Kesten
- Music by: Jeremiah Lockwood
- Distributed by: SnagFilms
- Release date: January 19, 2008
- Running time: 83 minutes
- Country: United States
- Language: English

Holy Land Hardball (2008) is a documentary film about the founding of the professional Israel Baseball League in 2007.

== Synopsis ==
Boston bagel maker Larry Baras, who had no sports management experience, wanted to create a professional baseball league in Israel. He recruited former Jewish major leaguers Art Shamsky, Ken Holtzman, and Ron Blomberg as team managers in the Israel Baseball League.

== Film festivals ==
It premiered at the Silverdocs AFI/Discovery Channel Documentary Film Festival and was shown at many other film festivals.

== Reviews ==
Fandango said of Holy Land Hardball:

An entertaining documentary, showing a side of Israel far from the news headlines - one of peace, normalcy and discovering the joys of the great American pastime.

Indiewire says of Holy Land Hardball:

All things considered, Kesten and Rapkin respect their subjects to the point where "Holy Land Hardball" functions as a warm portrait of people guided by spiritual unity and athletic ambition.
