= Prinstein =

Prinstein is a surname. Notable people with the surname include:

- Justin Prinstein (born 1984), American baseball player
- Mitch Prinstein (fl. early 21st century), American author and psychologist
- Myer Prinstein (1878–1925), Polish-American track and field athlete
