= Gezer (kibbutz) =

Kibbutz in central Israel

Gezer: גֶּזֶר (Hebrew)
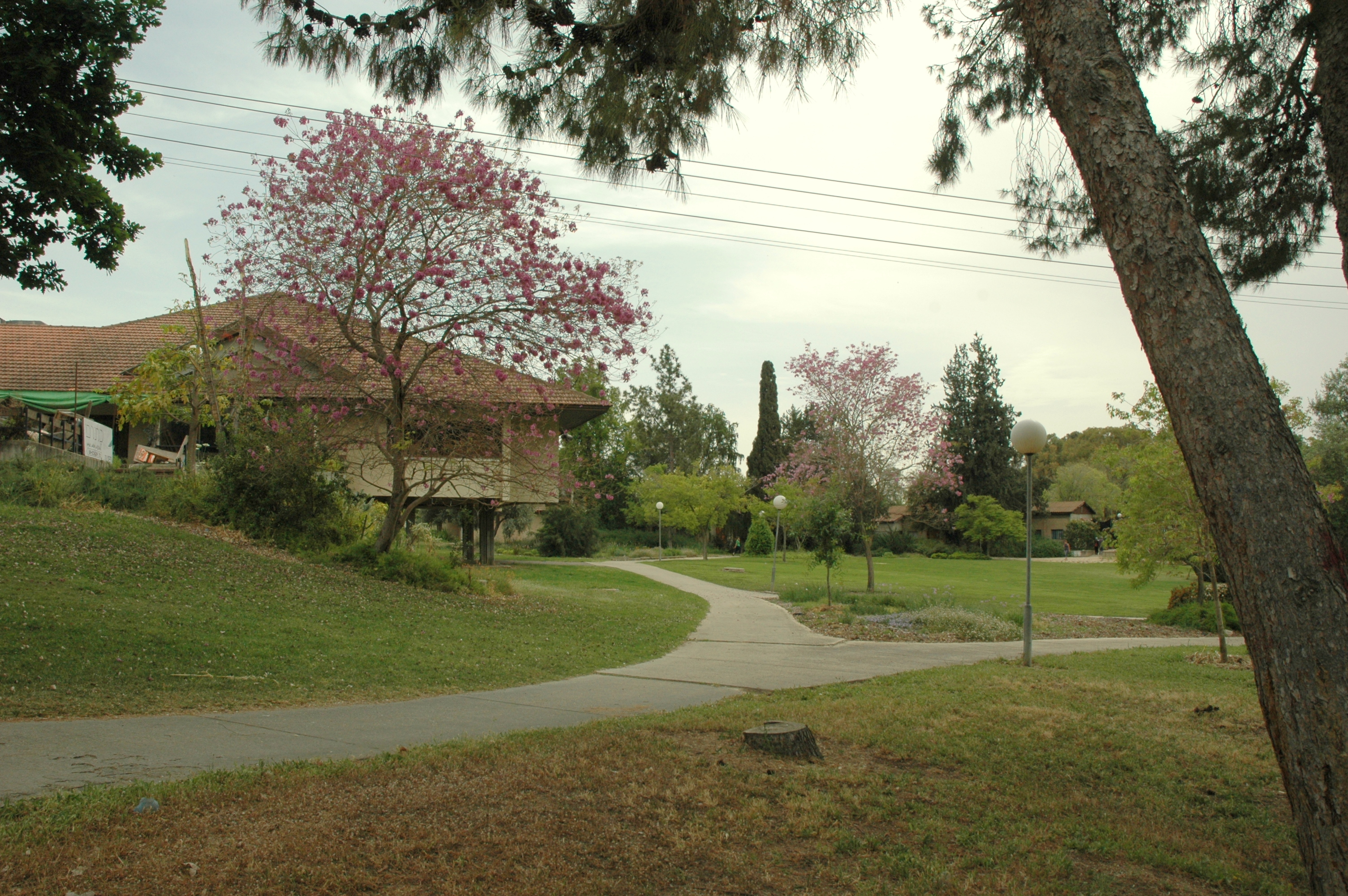

- Location within Central Israel
- Coordinates: 31°52′31″N 34°55′17″E
- Country: Israel
- District: Central
- Subdistrict: Ramla
- Council: Gezer
- Affiliation: Kibbutz Movement
- Founded: 1945
- Founder: European immigrants
- Population (2024): 430

Gezer (Hebrew: גֶּזֶר) is a kibbutz in central Israel. Located in the Shephelah between Modi'in, Ramle and Rehovot, it falls under the jurisdiction of Gezer Regional Council. In 2024 it had a population of 430.

== History ==
The kibbutz was established in 1945 on land purchased by the Ancient Order of Maccabeans in England, a philanthropic society founded in 1896. The kibbutz is located near the former Palestinian village of al-Qubab. The founders were Jewish immigrants from Europe, who named the kibbutz after the biblical city of Gezer (Joshua 21:21), identified at a tell (archaeological mound) located nearby.

On 10 June 1948, the day after an attempt to take Latrun was performed by the Yiftach and Harel brigades during the 1948 Arab–Israeli War, a battalion-size force of the Arab Legion, supported by irregulars and a dozen armoured cars, attacked the kibbutz, which was defended by 68 Haganah soldiers. After four hours of battle, the kibbutz fell, with 29 defenders killed, a dozen escapees, and the remaining taken prisoner. Two Arab legionnaires were killed. However, in the evening the kibbutz was abandoned to the irregulars and taken back by two Palmach squads.

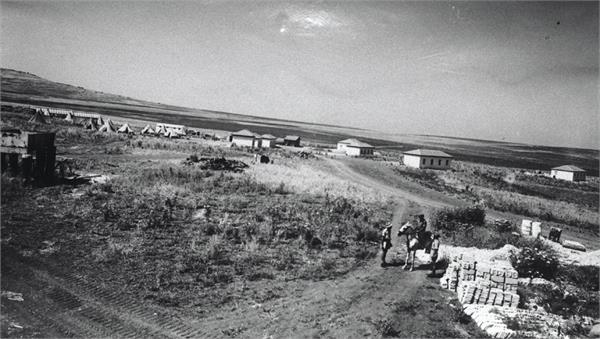
Gezer kibbutz 1945

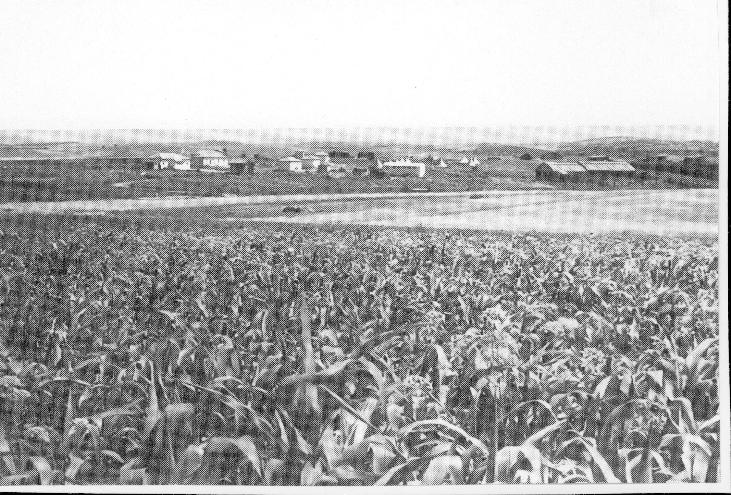
Kibbutz Gezer in 1948

After the war it was rebuilt, but came apart in 1964 due to social difficulties. The current kibbutz was founded on 4 July 1974 by a gar'in from North America, which included peace activist Vivian Silver.

== Sport ==
Kibbutz Gezer Field is one of the few regulation baseball fields in Israel. Construction of the field in 1983 took six weeks and was funded by American donors. The first game was played within a few months. A backstop, covered benches for players and a refreshment stand were added at a later date. In 1989, a scoreboard and outfield fence were erected for the Maccabiah Games.

== Red hair festival ==
Since 2014 a red hair event has been held at the Kibbutz for the local Israeli red hair community. The festival includes performances, group discussions surrounding breaking stigmas about gingers, and even helps red heads to find their ginger spouse. However, the number of attendees has to be restricted due to the risk of rocket attacks, leading to anger in the red-hair community.

== Notable people ==
- Aharon Almog, Israeli writer, poet and playwright. After discharging from the IDF he was among the ones who reestablished the kibbutz Gezer and many his stories and poems are dedicated to this place.
- Alon Leichman, Olympian, member of the Israel national baseball team, and assistant pitching coach for the Cincinnati Reds

== See also ==
- Gezer (biblical city) and the Sack of Gezer
- Gezer calendar – ancient artifact
- Israel Baseball League
