= Steve Hertz (third baseman) =

American baseball player (1945–2025)

- Third baseman
- Born: February 26, 1945; Wright-Patterson Air Force Base, Ohio, U.S.
- Died: December 4, 2025 (aged 80); Miami, Florida, U.S.
- Batted: Right Threw: Right

MLB debut
- April 21, 1964, for the Houston Colt .45s

Last MLB appearance
- June 7, 1964, for the Houston Colt .45s

MLB statistics
- Batting average: .000
- Games played: 5
- At bats: 4
- Stats at Baseball Reference

Teams
- Houston Colt .45s (1964)

Stephen Allan Hertz (February 26, 1945 – December 4, 2025) was an American Major League Baseball player. He was also manager of the Tel Aviv Lightning in the Israel Baseball League. He attended the University of Miami in Coral Gables, Florida, and was Jewish.

== Major League Baseball ==
Hertz made his major league debut in 1964 with the Houston Colt .45s and played in five games.

== Israel Baseball League ==
In 2007, Hertz was manager of the Tel Aviv Lightning in the lone season of the Israel Baseball League. The Lightning finished the regular season in second place with a 26–14 (.650) record, and lost to the Modi'in Miracle in the playoff semifinals.

== High school and college coach ==
Hertz coached baseball teams at Miami Coral Park High School, Miami Southridge High School, and Miami Dade-Wolfson Community College.

== Death ==
Hertz died in Miami, Florida, on December 4, 2025, at the age of 80.

== Awards and honors ==
In 1985, Hertz was inducted into the Miami High School Hall of Fame. In 2006, he was inducted into the Florida Community College Activities Association Hall of Fame.
