= Tony Ferrara =

American baseball player, coach, and scout

Anthony Ferrara (c. 1927 – December 4, 2009) was an American professional baseball player, coach, and scout.

== Early life ==
Ferrara was born in Schenectady, New York in the late 1920s. After high school he got a scholarship to the University of Miami. After college he signed with the St. Louis Cardinals and played minor league baseball before a shoulder injury ended his playing career.

== Coaching career ==
In the 1960s Ferrara spent five seasons as the hitting coach for St. Johns University.

In 1970, Ferrara moved to New York City and landed a job with the New York Yankees and remained with them until 1997, serving in a number of roles including batting practice pitcher, bullpen coach, and scout.

In 1999 former Yankee Rick Cerone asked Ferrara to become first base coach for the Newark Bears of the independent Atlantic League, a position he held for three seasons.

In 2007, he coached and managed in the professional Israel Baseball League and served as Assistant Commissioner..

In 2009, Ferrara returned to the Bears as bench coach.

== The Natural ==
In 1984, Ferrara served as technical advisor for the Robert Redford film The Natural and appeared in the film as third base coach.

== Death ==
Ferrara died on December 4, 2009, a few weeks after suffering a stroke. He was survived by a younger brother, Joseph, who lived in Florida.
