= Scott Coolbaugh =

American baseball player & coach (born 1966)

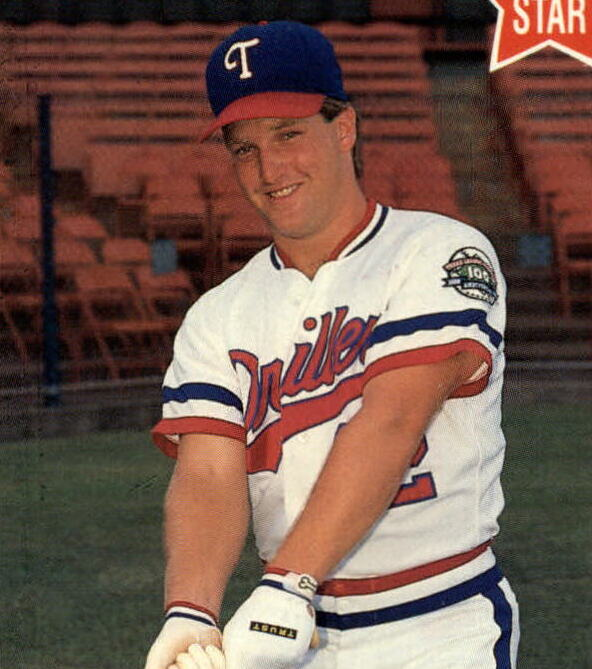
- Coolbaugh with the Tulsa Drillers c. 1988
- Third baseman / Coach
- Born: June 13, 1966 (age 59); Binghamton, New York, U.S.
- Batted: Right Threw: Right

Professional debut
- MLB: September 2, 1989, for the Texas Rangers
- NPB: April 7, 1995, for the Hanshin Tigers
- KBO: April 11, 1998, for the Hyundai Unicorns

Last appearance
- MLB: August 11, 1994, for the St. Louis Cardinals
- NPB: June 6, 1996, for the Hanshin Tigers
- KBO: October 30, 1998, for the Hyundai Unicorns

MLB statistics
- Batting average: .215
- Home runs: 8
- Runs batted in: 41

NPB statistics
- Batting average: .260
- Home runs: 24
- Runs batted in: 93

KBO statistics
- Batting average: .317
- Home runs: 26
- Runs batted in: 97
- Stats at Baseball Reference

Teams
- As player: Texas Rangers (1989–1990); San Diego Padres (1991); St. Louis Cardinals (1994); Hanshin Tigers (1995–1996); Hyundai Unicorns (1998); As coach: Texas Rangers (2011–2012); Baltimore Orioles (2015–2018); Chicago White Sox (2020); Detroit Tigers (2021–2022); San Diego Padres (2023)

Scott Robert Coolbaugh (born June 13, 1966) is an American former Major League Baseball (MLB) third baseman and coach who played for the Texas Rangers, San Diego Padres, and St. Louis Cardinals between 1989 and 1994.

== Playing career ==
Coolbaugh attended Theodore Roosevelt High School and the University of Texas-Austin. In 1985 and 1986, he played collegiate summer baseball with the Chatham A's of the Cape Cod Baseball League and was named a league all-star both seasons. He was selected by the Texas Rangers in the third round of the 1987 MLB draft.

Coolbaugh played for the Rangers in 1989 and 1990, for the San Diego Padres in 1991, and for the St. Louis Cardinals in 1994. He also played two seasons in Japan for the Hanshin Tigers in 1995 and 1996, and continued to play in the minor leagues until 1999.

== Coaching career ==
In 1999, Coolbaugh played for the Triple-A Tucson Sidewinders and also was a player–coach for Double-A El Paso. In 2000, he was the manager of the High Desert Mavericks, and in 2001, he was the manager of the Lancaster JetHawks. In 2002, he was again the hitting coach for El Paso. Coolbaugh served as El Paso's manager from 2003–2004. From 2007–2008, he was the hitting coach for Double-A Frisco in the Rangers' organization. On December 29, 2008, he was named the hitting coach for the Triple-A Oklahoma City RedHawks. On June 8, 2011, the Texas Rangers brought him in from their Triple-A affiliate, Round Rock, to replace hitting coach Thad Bosley.

On October 19, 2012, Coolbaugh was replaced as hitting coach by Dave Magadan. He was offered another job within the organization. Coolbaugh served as hitting coach for the Baltimore Orioles from 2015 through 2018. He then served as hitting coach for the Oklahoma City Dodgers in 2019. Coolbaugh was hired by the Chicago White Sox as their assistant hitting coach prior to the 2020 season.

On November 7, 2020, Coolbaugh was named hitting coach for the Detroit Tigers, a position he served in until being dismissed following the 2022 season.

On January 17, 2023, the San Diego Padres hired Coolbaugh as their assistant hitting coach. After two seasons, he left in late 2024. On January 21, 2026, Coolbaugh was announced as hitting coordinator within San Diego's player development department.

== Personal ==
Coolbaugh is the brother of the late major league player and minor league coach Mike Coolbaugh, who was killed when he was struck on the left side of his neck below the ear by a line drive while serving as the first base coach for the Tulsa Drillers.
