= Ty Eriksen =

American baseball player

Ty Eriksen (born 1984) is an American former professional baseball player from Oregon. He played Division 3 baseball at Willamette University.

Eriksen played in the German Bundesliga (baseball) for the Haar Disciples in 2006, and from 2008 to 2012, primarily as an outfielder. In addition to playing Eriksen coached within the club, helping with the development of the youth program and additional men's teams. Eriksen rejoined the Disciples' top team as a player for the 2015 and 2016 seasons in the attempted establishment of the Euro League Baseball, a short-lived Europe-wide baseball league.

In 2007 Eriksen was a part of the inaugural season of the Israel Baseball League, the first-ever pro baseball league in the Middle East, playing first base for the Netanya Tigers.

He spent parts of seasons playing in the Swiss NLA for the Therwil Flyers of Basel (2012), and with the Janossomorja Rascals (2011/13) in the Hungarian league and the Euro Interleague Baseball, an extra-league competition between the top qualifying clubs in Eastern Europe and the Balkans.

As a coach, Eriksen has worked with the following programs: Israel national baseball team (2015–2018), UVV Utrecht (2017), Deutscher Baseball Akademie (2016), Austria national baseball team (2010–11).

Eriksen was a co-operator of the International Stars baseball organization.

He organized and taught a course for university students of the Zentrale Hochschulsportanlage, "Baseball as a cultural sporting trend", and has visiting schools as a part of community engagement activities.

From 2008-2012, Eriksen was a regular contributor to Mister-Baseball, an English language news site covering baseball in Europe. In 2016, Eriksen was enlisted by MeinSportRadio.de to provide commentary for the 2016 European Baseball Championship in Hoofddorp, Netherlands.
