= Kibbutz Gezer Field =

Israeli baseball stadium

Coordinates: 31°52′28.97″N 34°55′3.04″E

Kibbutz Gezer Field was the home ground for Israeli baseball teams Modi'in Miracle and Bet Shemesh Blue Sox in the Israel Baseball League. It is located in Kibbutz Gezer.

The field is one of the few regulation baseball fields in Israel. Construction of the field in 1983, funded by American donors, took six weeks. The first game was played within a few months. A backstop, covered benches for players and a refreshment stand were added at a later date. In 1989, a scoreboard and outfield fence were erected for the Maccabiah Games.
