= Sportek Baseball Field =

Baseball home ground for Israeli teams

Coordinates: 32°5′52.8″N 34°47′3.8″E

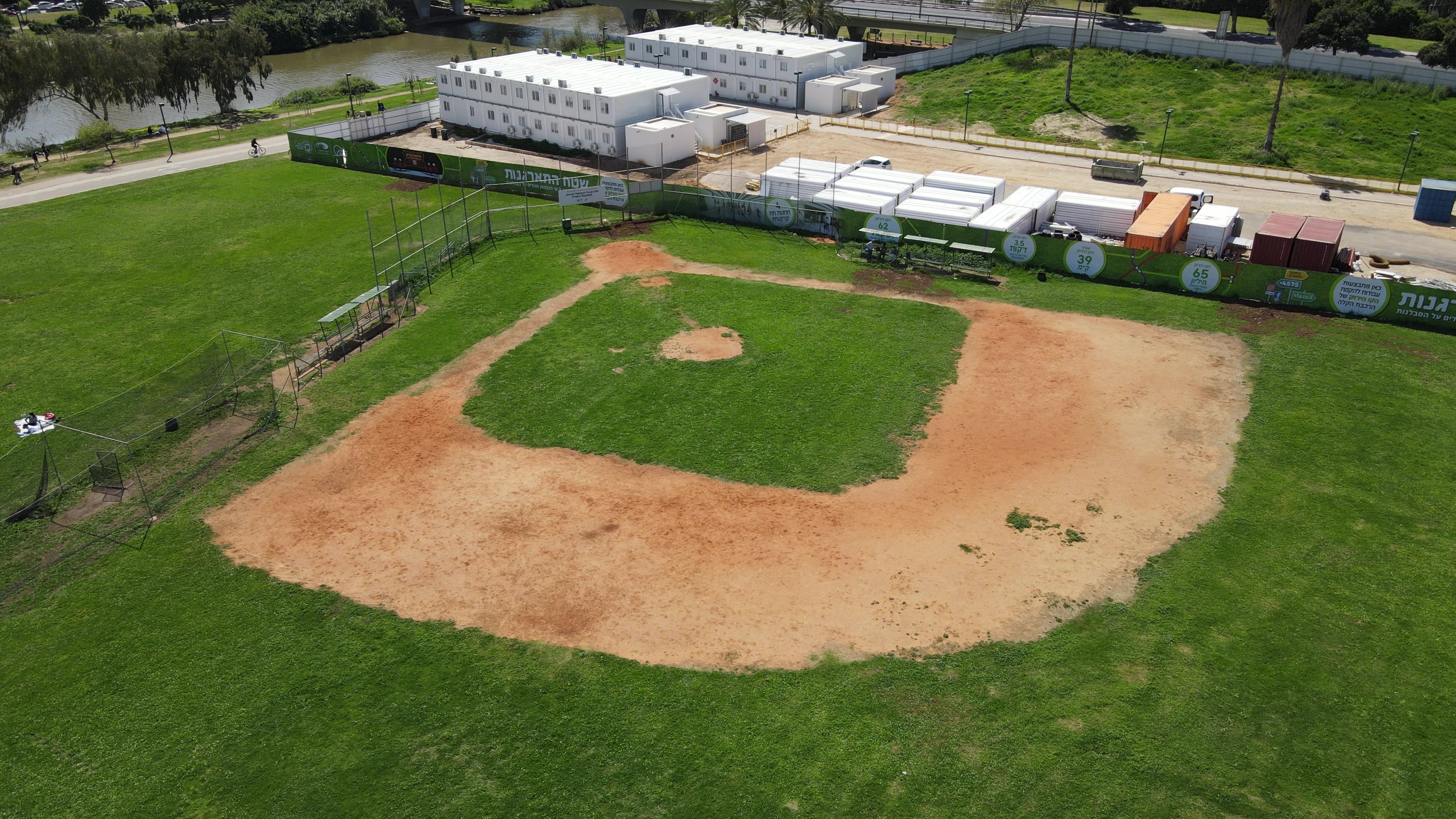
Sportek Baseball Field, Tel-Aviv

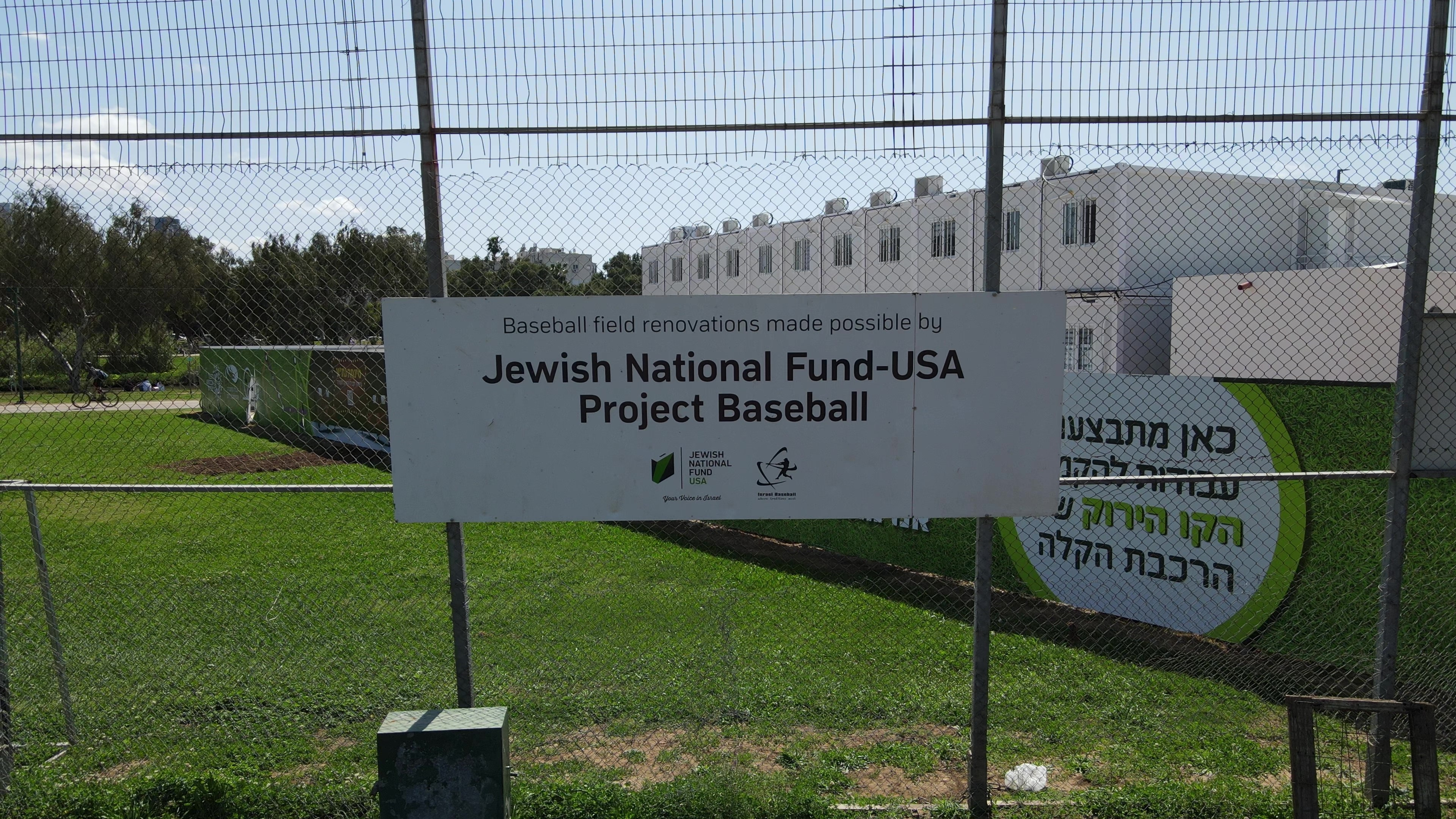
Jewish National Fund-USA Project Baseball

The Sportek Baseball Field, was the home ground for Israeli baseball teams Netanya Tigers and Tel Aviv Lightning in the Israel Baseball League (IBL). Sportek was originally supposed to be open for the start of the IBL season in 2007, however due to construction delays it did not open until two weeks later, on 10 July 2007. Additionally, due to the delays, many safety features were not complete, such as padding on the fences.

== History ==
The funding for Sportek Baseball Field came from Jewish supporters based in North America, though opening was delayed due to construction issues. Many features common in most ballparks also were not present. Bullpens were also never built, forcing pitchers to warm up in foul territory. Dugouts were canvas tents and benches. Down the right field line, a home run was only 240 feet (73 m) away, considerably shorter than any professional ballpark. Rather than traditional stadium seating, Sportek only offered green plastic chairs. Without floodlights at Sportek, all IBL games had to be played during day time, starting around 5:30pm.

It is located in Tel Aviv in the southern end of Tel Aviv's largest outdoor public park, a 10-minute walk from the seaside Tel Aviv hotels. Sportek is a multipurpose facility, with space for basketball, soccer, wall climbing, skating, jobbing, frisbee, and trampolining.

In October 2007, the Tel Aviv-Yafo Municipality announced plans to downgrade the field back into a public park and remove a number of the renovations despite objections from Israeli baseball supporters. This resulted in the IBL declaring that they would not use it for the following season. Despite the downgrade, it was still used for youth baseball in the 2020s.
