= Modi'in Miracle =

Modi'in Miracle מודיעין מיראקל

Information
- League: Israel Baseball League
- Location: Modi'in
- Ballpark: Kibbutz Gezer Field
- Founded: 2007
- League championships: 0
- Colors: Orange and blue
- Manager: Art Shamsky

Current uniforms
Home

The Modi'in Miracle (Hebrew: מודיעין מיראקל) was an Israeli baseball team from Modi'in in the Israel Baseball League.

The Miracle finished the inaugural 2007 season 22-19 (.537) in third place, and after upsetting the # 2 Tel Aviv Lightning in the semi-finals, lost to Ron Blomberg's Bet Shemesh Blue Sox 3-0 in the championship game.

Miracle catcher, and former Boston Red Sox minor leaguer, Eladio Rodriguez was the league batting champion (.461). and had 16 home runs in 102 at bats. He was co-winner of The Hank Greenberg Award for Most Valuable Player.

6' 6" Maximo Nelson from San Pedro de Macorís, in the Dominican Republic, led the league with 85 strikeouts; he pitched for the Gulf Coast Yankees in 2004 (posting a 6-5 record, with a 2.63 ERA).

== History ==

The name for the Miracle is a reference to the miracle of the Maccabean revolt (which started in the area presently known as Maccabim, just outside Modi'in) and victory over Antiochus IV Epiphanes in 167 BCE. Thus the use of a hanukiah in the team's logo, an object commonly associated with the miracle victory of the Maccabees over the Greeks.

On February 26, 2007, it was announced that Major League Baseball player Art Shamsky of the "Miracle Mets" would be the manager of the Miracle. Team colors also reflect Shamsky's stint with the New York Mets, and hopes that IBL officials had of creating a rivalry between the Bet Shemesh Blue Sox (similar colors to the New York Yankees) and the Miracle.

In the inaugural draft in 2007, the Modi'in Miracle selected with the first pick Aaron Levin, an infielder from Cuesta College.

Pitcher Sandy Koufax, then 71, was the last player chosen by the Miracle. "His selection is a tribute to the esteem with which he is held by everyone associated with this league," said Art Shamsky, who manages the Miracle. "It's been 41 years between starts for him. If he's rested and ready to take the mound again, we want him on our team." Koufax declined the offer to join the team.

== Stadium ==
Located in Kibbutz Gezer, Gezer Field was home to the Miracle as well as the Bet Shemesh Blue Sox.

== Roster ==
Modi'in Miracle roster
Active (25-man) roster		Coaches/Other
Starting rotation: 1 (Australia) Matt Bennett; 4 (United States) Andre Sternberg; 10 (Israel) Rafi Stern; 17 (Canada) Ian Okorofsky; 20 (Canada) Jonathan Ramoo; 21 (Dominican Republic) Audy Alcantara; 25 (Israel) Nate Rosenberg; 30 (United States) Craig Eagle; 48 (Dominican Republic) Maximo Nelson; Bullpen: Currently unknown; † 15-day disabled list Roster updated 08.03.2007; Transactions	Catchers: 6 (Dominican Republic) Eladio Rodriguez; 8 (United States) Steve Litvak; Infielders: 2 (United States) Noah Walker; 9 (United States) Aaron Levin; 12 (Canada) Oren Gal; 22 (United States) Jamie Aimar; 23 (United States) Adam Harwood; Outfielders: 3 (Israel) Moish Lewis; 5 (United States) Greg Marlettl; 15 (Dominican Republic) Adalberto Paulino; 16 (Australia) Moko Moanaroa; 18 (Canada) Dan Drori; 19 (United States) Dan Saltzman; Designated hitters: Currently unknown	Manager: 24 (United States) Art Shamsky; Coaches: 7 (United States) Tony Ferrara; 19 (United States) Dan Saltzman; Suspended list: Currently vacant
