= Adam Crabb =

Australian professional baseball pitcher

- Pitcher
- Born: 1 June 1984; Barmera, South Australia, Australia
- Bats: right Throws: right
- Stats at Baseball Reference

Adam Crabb (born 1 June 1984) is an Australian professional baseball pitcher who played in the inaugural Israel Baseball League.

Crabb was born in Barmera, South Australia, and played at the Southern Districts Baseball Club in Adelaide.

He was a member of the Tel Aviv Lightning and was selected in the Israel Baseball League's 2007 North All Star Team.

Adam played in the Netherlands in 2008 and is currently playing for the 4 time reigning Belgian Champions The Port of Antwerp Royal Greys, where he will compete in the 2009 European Cup.

In 2012 he played for the Adelaide Bite of the Australian Baseball League.
