= Eladio Rodriguez =

Dominican baseball player (born 1979)

- Catcher / Outfielder
- Born: April 4, 1979 (age 46); Mao, Dominican Republic
- Bats: Right Throws: Right
- Stats at Baseball Reference
Medals
Men's baseball
Representing Dominican Republic
Central American and Caribbean Games
Silver medal – second place	2006 Cartagena	Team

Eladio Y. Rodriguez (born April 4, 1979) is a Dominican professional baseball player. Rodriguez formerly went under the aliases of Iván Rodríguez and Carlos Aleman.

== Career ==
Rodriguez was signed as an undrafted free agent by the Boston Red Sox in 1998.

In 2001, he batted .356 for the Gulf Coast League Red Sox, and .307 for the Lowell Spinners of the New York–Penn League (NYPL). In 2003, he batted .223 for the A+ Sarasota Red Sox of the Florida State League, splitting his time between the outfield and catcher. Used as an outfielder and a catcher in the past, Rodriguez was converted to a pitcher in 2004, and struck out 41 batters in 41 innings in the NYPL and Florida State League.

Rodriguez was the most valuable player for the Dominican team in the Central American Games and of the Caribbean Cartagena de Indias in 2006.

Rodriguez was the starting catcher for the Modi’in Miracle in the Israel Baseball League in 2007. He was the 2007 league batting champion (.461), and had 16 home runs in 102 at bats. He was announced co-winner of the Hank Greenberg Most Valuable Player Award of the inaugural IBL season, as well as the winner of the Best Defensive Catcher Award.

After that league-leading season, he was signed by the New York Yankees.

On April 28, 2008, Rodriguez was assigned to the Scranton/Wilkes-Barre Yankees, the Triple-A affiliate of the New York Yankees. In 2008, he caught and batted .333 for the AAA team, but also played for the Yankee AA and A+ teams. In 2010 he played for the Kansas City T-Bones of the Northern League.

Eladio now runs a youth Baseball organization called New York Sluggers based in The Bronx, New York.
