= Mike Coolbaugh =

American baseball player and coach (1972–2007)

- Third baseman / Coach
- Born: June 5, 1972; Binghamton, New York, U.S.
- Died: July 22, 2007 (aged 35); North Little Rock, Arkansas, U.S.
- Batted: Right Threw: Right

Professional debut
- MLB: July 16, 2001, for the Milwaukee Brewers
- KBO: April 5, 2003, for the Doosan Bears

Last appearance
- MLB: July 7, 2002, for the St. Louis Cardinals
- KBO: May 30, 2003, for the Doosan Bears

MLB statistics
- Batting average: .183
- Home runs: 2
- Runs batted in: 7

KBO statistics
- Batting average: .215
- Home runs: 10
- Runs batted in: 24
- Stats at Baseball Reference

Teams
- Milwaukee Brewers (2001); St. Louis Cardinals (2002); Doosan Bears (2003)

Michael Robert Coolbaugh (June 5, 1972 – July 22, 2007) was an American baseball player and coach. Born in Binghamton, New York, he was the brother of major leaguer Scott Coolbaugh. Coolbaugh died after being hit by a line drive while working as a first-base coach in a minor league game.

== Playing career ==
A 1990 graduate of Theodore Roosevelt High School in San Antonio, Texas, Coolbaugh was drafted by the Toronto Blue Jays in the 16th round (433rd overall) of the 1990 Major League Baseball draft. Coolbaugh spent 11 seasons in the minor leagues. He broke the Southern League record for runs batted in during a season.

Coolbaugh never played for the Blue Jays, but was called up to the major leagues on July 15, 2001, while playing for the Milwaukee Brewers Triple-A affiliate Indianapolis Indians. He played third base with the Milwaukee Brewers in 2001 and the St. Louis Cardinals in 2002. Coolbaugh made 44 career appearances, mainly at third base or as a pinch hitter, hitting .183.

In 2003, Coolbaugh traveled to Korea (as had his brother Scott) to play for the Doosan Bears in the KBO League. That year he hit .215 with 10 home runs and 24 RBI in 44 games.

In 2004, he set a franchise record by hitting 30 home runs with the New Orleans Zephyrs, an affiliate of the Houston Astros. In 2005, Coolbaugh was with the Astros' farm system and while playing for their Triple-A affiliate, the Round Rock Express, had 27 home runs and 101 runs batted in. The Astros were prepared to bring him up to the major leagues until he suffered a broken bone in his left hand during a game. In 2006, he signed with the Kansas City Royals. However, during spring training, Coolbaugh shattered his left wrist, leading to his retirement as a player.

== Coaching ==
Following his professional playing career, Coolbaugh turned to coaching. On July 3, 2007, he was hired as first base coach for the Texas League's Tulsa Drillers, the Double-A affiliate of the Colorado Rockies.

== Death ==
On July 22, 2007, Coolbaugh was killed during the ninth inning of a game against the Arkansas Travelers in North Little Rock, Arkansas, when a line drive hit by Drillers catcher Tino Sanchez struck him in the neck while he was standing in the first base coach's box. The impact ruptured Coolbaugh's left vertebral artery, which supplies significant parts of the brain with blood. The result, according to Pulaski County coroner Mark Malcolm, was a severe brain hemorrhage.

Travelers general manager Pete Laven was among the first to reach Coolbaugh after he collapsed, along with Travelers team doctor James Bryan, team athletic trainer Brian Reinker and Gene France, a local doctor who was sitting near the first base dugout with his daughter and a family friend, both of whom are also physicians. France watched as Bryan administered pain stimulus, applying pressure to various areas of Coolbaugh's body, all with no response. Cardiopulmonary resuscitation was administered to Coolbaugh on the field where he remained breathing until the ambulance reached the hospital.

Coolbaugh was pronounced dead at 9:47 p.m. CDT (0247 UTC, July 23), less than an hour after being struck with the line drive. The game, which the Travelers had been leading 7–3, was suspended. The next day, Texas League president Tom Kayser declared the game to be a complete game. Additionally, the Drillers and Travelers both chose to postpone the game scheduled for the following night.

After clinching the National League Wild Card playoff berth during the 2007 Major League Baseball season, the Colorado Rockies announced the team players voted to award Coolbaugh's widow, Amanda, a full share of their playoff winnings. Rockies general manager Dan O'Dowd said, "when I heard about what the players did, I almost cried." As the Rockies made it to the World Series, her share ended up being $233,505.18.

On November 8, 2007, MLB general managers decided that all base coaches would wear helmets starting with the upcoming 2008 season.

Coolbaugh's life and death are the subject of a book by S. L. Price, titled Heart of the Game: Life, Death, and Mercy in Minor League America.

== Legacy ==
In his honor, the Texas League established the Mike Coolbaugh Memorial Coach of the Year Award in 2007 to honor the most outstanding hitting or pitching coach in the league. The first recipient was his brother, Scott Coolbaugh.

In 2008, Minor League Baseball began presenting the annual Mike Coolbaugh Award to someone who has "shown an outstanding baseball work ethic, knowledge of the game, and skill in mentoring young players on the field".

On July 29, 2023, the Tulsa Drillers retired Coolbaugh’s number 29 in a pregame ceremony at ONEOK Field in downtown Tulsa.

== See also ==
- Baseball awards § Awards by Minor League Baseball (MiLB)
- Baseball awards § Texas League
- List of baseball players who died during their careers
- Phillip Hughes, cricketer who was killed by a ball that struck him while batting
