= Netanya Tigers =

Israeli baseball team

- נתניה טייגרס
- [[File: |frameless|class=pageimage|alt=]] Logo

Information
- League: Israel Baseball League
- Location: (Israel) Netanya
- Ballpark: Sportek Baseball Field
- Founded: 2006
- League championships: 0
- Colors: Orange and Black
- Manager: (Israel) Ami Baran

Current uniforms
Home

The Netanya Tigers (Hebrew: נתניה טייגרס) was an Israeli baseball team from Netanya in the Israel Baseball League.

The Tigers finished the inaugural 2007 season in fourth place, 19-21 (.475), and were defeated by the Bet Shemesh Blue Sox in the semifinals of the 2007 championship, 6-3.

== History ==

The team's Manager was Israeli Ami Baran, who was originally frohistory Of ideal The first player selected by the Tigers in the inaugural 2007 draft was outfielder Dan Rootenberg. He is a former Midwood High School and Binghamton University left-handed hitting outfielder, who hit .407 for Binghamton during his senior year, garnering All-SUNYAC and All-State honors, played in the Frontier League, the Swiss professional league, and for the Pleasantville Red Sox, and in 2006 batted .351 in the Westchester Rockland Wood Bat League. The first pitcher drafted by the Tigers was right-handed 6'5" pitcher Leon Feingold, who pitched for the State University of New York at Albany 1990-1994, the Cleveland Indians system from 1994-1995, the independent Atlantic League in 1999, and also played for the Pleasantville Red Sox. Both Rootenberg and Feingold were among the group of four players first signed by the League.

== Stadium ==
Located at the Sportek Baseball Field in Tel Aviv, due to a lack of appropriate facilities in Netanya.

== Update ==
For the first week of the season the Tigers did not have a home field, due to stadium construction delays in Tel Aviv. However, Sportek Stadium opened in mid-July 2007 at the intersection of Ibn Gvirol and Rokach Streets in Tel Aviv, and was home to both the Netanya Tigers and the Tel Aviv Lightning.

== Roster ==
Netanya Tigers roster
Active (25-man) roster		Coaches/Other
Starting rotation: 1 (Japan) Ryoju Kihara; 2 (United States) Matt Comiter; 4 (United States) Fabian Armenta; 12 (Dominican Republic) Julio Guerrero; 17 (United States) Justin Prinstein; 19 (United States) Mike Kerfeld; 25 (United States) Shlomo Lipetz; 26 (Colombia) Rafael Rojano; 45 (United States) Leon Feingold; 10 (Israel) Shlomo Lipetz; Bullpen: Currently unknown; † 15-day disabled list Roster updated 08.03.2007; Transactions	Catchers: 9 (Israel) Ophir Katz; 15 (Australia) Michael Ibbotson; 24 (United States) Sam Faeder; Infielders: 5 (United States) Ryan Forsythe; 8 (Dominican Republic) Hector De Los Santos; 11 (United States) Josh Eichenstein; 14 (United States) Ramon Rodriguez; 16 (United States) Ty Eriksen; Outfielders: 3 (United States) Dan Rootenberg; 7 (United States) Josh Doane; 10 (United States) Ben Engelhart; 21 (United States) Bryan Pinchuk; Designated hitters: Currently unknown	Manager: 23 (United States) Ami Baran; Coaches: 15 (Australia) Michael Ibbotsen; Suspended list: Currently vacant
