= Maximo Nelson =

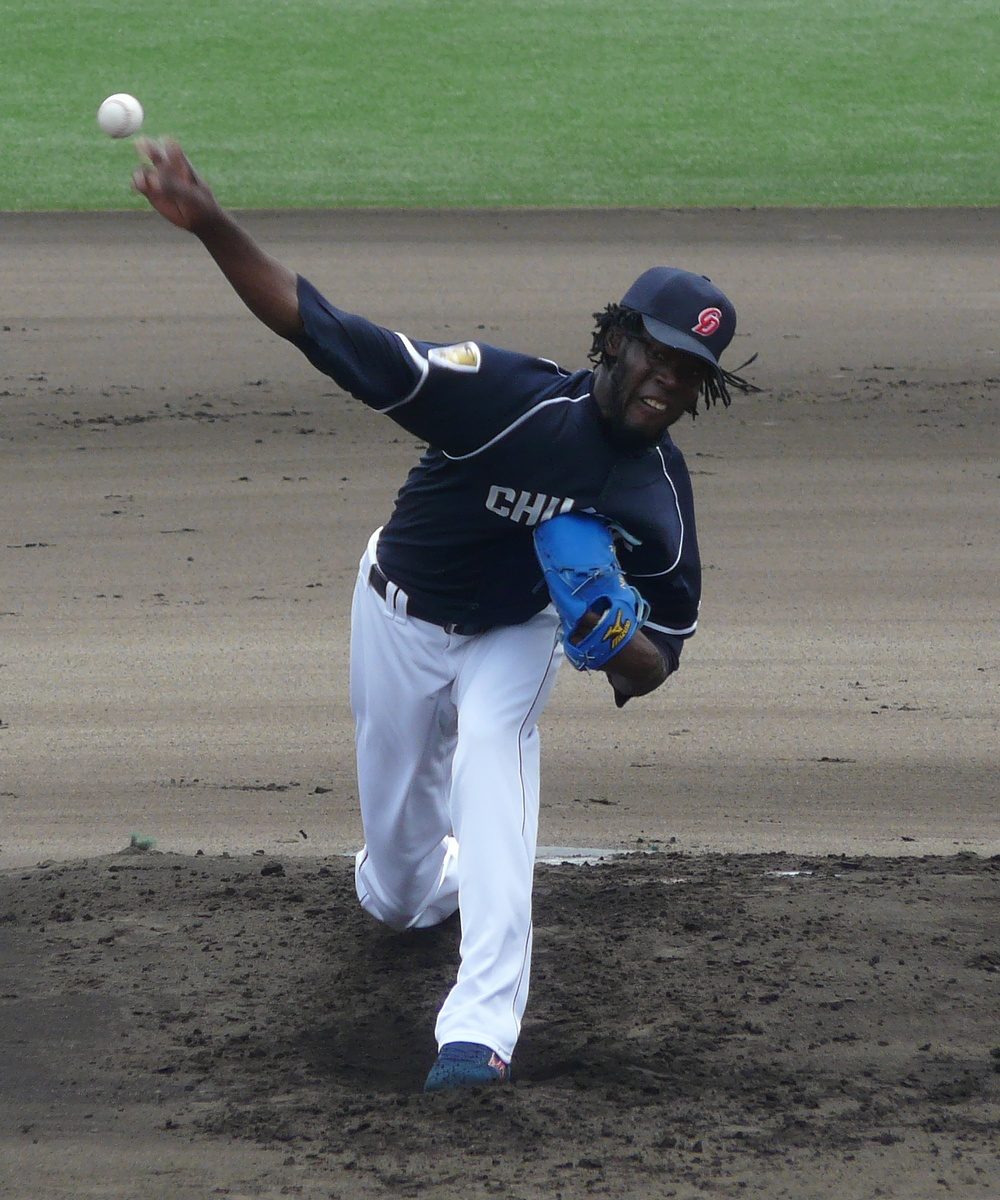
- Nelson in Chunichi Dragons

Free Agent
- Pitcher
- Born: April 21, 1982 (age 44); Santo Domingo, Dominican Republic
- Batted: Right Threw: Right

NPB debut
- July 19, 2008, for the Chunichi Dragons

Last NPB appearance
- September 8, 2012, for the Chunichi Dragons

NPB statistics
- Win–loss record: 15–21
- Earned run average: 2.97
- Strikeouts: 250
- Stats at Baseball Reference

Teams
- Chunichi Dragons (2008–2012)

Maximo Nelson (born April 21, 1982) is a Dominican professional baseball pitcher who is currently a free agent. Nelson played for Chunichi Dragons of Nippon Professional Baseball from 2008 to 2012.

== Career ==
Nelson signed with the New York Yankees in October 2000 under the false name Willy Pie and a birthdate that made himself nearly two years younger than he actually was. After the deception was revealed he had trouble obtaining a visa and stayed in the Dominican Republic from 2001 to 2003. In 2004 he posted a 6-3 win–loss record of the GCL Yankees. Nelson was subsequently deported and banned from reentering the United States after being involved in a marriage-for-visa scam. Nelson played for the Modi'in Miracle of the Israel Baseball League. In 2008, Nelson signed with Chunichi Dragons.

== Personal life ==
Nelson is of Haitian descent.
