= Juan Feliciano =

Dominican Republic baseball player

- Pitcher
- Born: April 6, 1980 (age 46); Santo Domingo, Dominican Republic
- Batted: Right Threw: Right

NPB debut
- June 13, 2004, for the Chunichi Dragons

Last NPB appearance
- September 24, 2006, for the Chunichi Dragons
- Stats at Baseball Reference

Teams
- Hiroshima Toyo Carp (2004–2006)

Juan Feliciano (born April 6, 1980) is a Dominican former baseball player. He played for the Hiroshima Toyo Carp in the Central League.
