= Ron Blomberg =

American baseball player (born 1948)

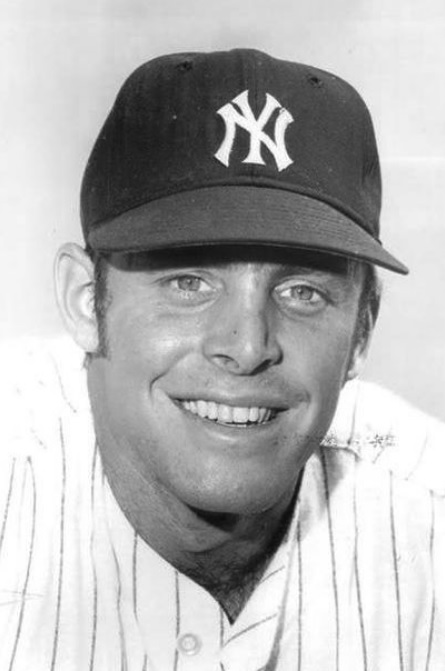
- Blomberg in 1972
- First baseman / Designated hitter
- Born: August 23, 1948 (age 78); Atlanta, Georgia, U.S.
- Batted: Left Threw: Right

MLB debut
- September 10, 1969, for the New York Yankees

Last MLB appearance
- October 12, 1978, for the Chicago White Sox

MLB statistics
- Batting average: .293
- Home runs: 52
- Runs batted in: 224
- Stats at Baseball Reference

Teams
- New York Yankees (1969, 1971–1976); Chicago White Sox (1978)

Ronald Mark Blomberg (/ˈbluːmbərɡ/ BLOOM-bərg; born August 23, 1948), nicknamed "Boomer", is an American former professional baseball player and minor league manager. He played in Major League Baseball as a designated hitter, first baseman, and right fielder. He played for the New York Yankees (1969, 1971–1976) and Chicago White Sox (1978), and was the manager of the Bet Shemesh Blue Sox in the Israel Baseball League (2007). He was the first designated hitter in Major League Baseball history. He batted left-handed, and threw right-handed.

Over eight seasons, Blomberg compiled a .293 batting average (391-for-1,333) with 52 home runs, 224 RBIs, 184 runs, 67 doubles, and 8 triples in 461 games. He added a .360 on-base percentage and a .473 slugging average. For his career, he hit .304 against right-handers, and .304 with two out and runners in scoring position, as well as .325 when the score was tied.

== Early and personal life ==
Born in Atlanta, Georgia, Blomberg is Jewish with roots in Romania.

Blomberg enjoyed the attention he received in New York because he was Jewish: "To be able to play in front of 8 million Jews! Can’t beat it. I lit everyone’s candles for every bar mitzvah in the city. It was like I was related to everyone. They named a sandwich after me at the Stage Deli!"

He is sixth all-time in career batting average (behind Hank Greenberg, Ryan Braun, Buddy Myer, Lou Boudreau, and Phil Weintraub) among Jewish major league baseball players.

== High school ==
Blomberg attended Druid Hills High School, earning four letters each in baseball, basketball, football, and track, and graduated in 1967. He received 125 basketball scholarship offers, and John Wooden of the University of California at Los Angeles came out to meet him in person. Roger Couch, Blomberg's basketball coach, said: "Blomberg is the finest basketball player I ever saw — high school or college." He also received 100 football scholarship offers.

Blomberg was selected by the Yankees with the first overall pick of the 1967 amateur draft, and signed for $75,000 ($724,000 today). He attended DeKalb Junior College part-time, and later majored in psychology at Fairleigh Dickinson University.

== Minor league career ==
Blomberg played in the minor leagues from 1967 to 1971. In 1971 he was hitting .326 with a .565 slugging percentage for the Yankees AAA team, the Syracuse Chiefs, when the Yankees called him up to the major leagues.

== Major league career ==
=== New York Yankees (1969–1976) ===
Blomberg made his major league debut on September 10, 1969, two weeks after his 21st birthday. After going 3-for-6 in his first season, Blomberg was out in 1970 with injuries. In 1971, he hit .322 for the parent club in 199 at bats. In 1972, he hit a career-high 14 home runs and 22 doubles in 299 at bats.

Blomberg was a natural hitter who had a remarkably quick bat with tremendous power. Many felt that he should play every day but manager Ralph Houk platooned him, hampering his ability to develop into a star player. Blomberg was the first major leaguer to bat as a designated hitter in a regular season game. On April 6, 1973, at Fenway Park, he was walked by Red Sox pitcher Luis Tiant on five pitches with the bases loaded in the first inning, and the bat he used is in Cooperstown's Hall of Fame. Blomberg finished 1973 with a healthy .329 average, .395 OBP, and .498 SLG in 301 at-bats; he hit .351 with runners in scoring position.

In 1974, Blomberg hit .311, and .338 with runners in scoring position. He was injured in 1975, and missed all but one game of the pennant-winning 1976 season. He tore his knee in the 1977 exhibition season when he hit the outfield wall, and missed that season too. "I had four knee and two shoulder injuries," he said. "Still, I gave 120 percent. I lived in Riverdale, and when I was injured, people came up to me and waved to me and hugged me." He became a free agent at the end of the 1977 season.

=== Chicago White Sox (1978) ===
The White Sox signed Blomberg as a free agent for $300,000 in 1978. He played his final game for the White Sox on October 1, 1978, at 30 years of age.

=== Honors ===
Blomberg was inducted into the National Jewish Sports Hall of Fame in 2004.

In 2007 Blomberg received the city of Atlanta’s Phoenix Award from Mayor Shirley Franklin for his outstanding service and achievements, both as a professional athlete and citizen through his charitable works in Atlanta and throughout the country.

Blomberg twice was voted the most popular person in New York.

== Managing career ==
Blomberg managed the Bet Shemesh Blue Sox in the 2007 inaugural season of the Israel Baseball League. He skippered his team to a league-leading 29–12 (.707) regular season won-lost record, as well as to the IBL Championship. Blomberg had previously declined an offer from the Yankees to manage a team in their minor system.

Being in Israel, Blomberg said, “was the greatest thing — just one notch below playing for the Yankees.” In the league they were obliged to have at least two Jewish players on each team, and Blomberg had two Orthodox Israelis on his. When they asked for time out to say Mincha, he was taken aback. Then he saw the crowd joining them to daven behind the food concession. “It was the greatest rush of my life,” he said. “I was in the Holy Land, near King Solomon’s tomb. I knew I was protected.” But when the team still lost the game, he demanded: “You said your prayers — so what happened?”

== Scouting ==
Blomberg is a scout for the New York Yankees in the Atlanta area.

== Writing ==
In April 2006, Blomberg's autobiography, Designated Hebrew: the Ron Blomberg Story was released by Sports Publishing. It was co-written by baseball writer Dan Schlossberg. The book discusses Blomberg's life leading up to his major league career, his playing days as a Yankee, and his Jewish heritage.

In 2021, Triumph Books published The Captain & Me, Blomberg's second book. It is subtitled On and Off The Field with Thurman Munson. Baseball writer Dan Epstein assisted Blomberg, and Munson's widow wrote an introduction. Blomberg is using the book to advocate for Munson's induction into the Baseball Hall of Fame.

== Summer camp ==
Blomberg has been running a summer baseball camp for kids at the New Jersey Y Camps since 2006. He also ran a baseball day camp in Paramus, New Jersey in the 1970s.

== Philanthropy ==
After his retirement from baseball in 1978, Blomberg worked with numerous charitable organizations, most recently the Israel Cancer Research Fund, where he serves as honorary chairman and spokesperson.

== See also ==
- List of Jewish Major League Baseball players
