= Tel Aviv Lightning =

Israeli baseball club

Tel Aviv Lightning תל אביב לייטנינ
- [[File: |frameless|class=pageimage|alt=]] Logo

Information
- League: Israel Baseball League
- Location: (Israel) Tel Aviv
- Ballpark: Sportek Baseball Field
- Founded: 2006
- League championships: 0
- Colors: Blue
- Manager: (United States) Steve Hertz

Current uniforms
Home

The Tel Aviv Lightning (Hebrew: תל אביב לייטנינג) was an Israeli baseball team from Tel Aviv in the Israel Baseball League.

The Lightning finished the inaugural 2007 season in second place with a 26-14 (.650) record, and lost to the Modi'in Miracle in the semifinals of the 2007 IBL championship.

6' 5" lefthander Aaron Pribble was 7-2, with a league-leading 1.94 ERA. Daniel Kaufman, who pitched for Emory University, held opposing batters to a .170 batting average. The Most Valuable Israeli Player was pitcher Dan Rothem.

== History ==

On February 26, 2007 it was announced that former Major League Baseball player Steve Hertz would be the manager of the Express.

The first player selected by the Lightning in the inaugural draft was Dominican catcher Anderson Mejia.

== Stadium ==
Located at the Sportek Baseball Field in Tel Aviv.

== 2007 roster ==
Tel Aviv Lightning roster
Active (25-man) roster		Coaches/Other
Starting rotation: 18 (Australia) Adam Crabb; 22 (United States) Mike Etkin; 24 (United States) Cameron Ewers; 7 (United States) Daniel Kaufman; 20 (United States) Aaron Pribble; 30 (Israel) Dan Rothem; 4 (United States) Joey Sherman; 6 (United States) Jason Bonder; Bullpen: Currently unknown; † 15-day disabled list Roster updated 02.05.2007; Transactions	Catchers: 9 (United States) Adam Kopiec; 21 (Australia) Dane Wigg; 23 (United States) Eric Rattner; Infielders: 1 (United States) Jacob Levy; 2 (Dominican Republic) Raul Franco; 5 (United States) Sam Marthinsen; 8 (United States) Matt Brill; 10 (United States) Nate Fish; 15 (Dominican Republic) Stewart Perez Brito; Outfielders: 3 (United States) Brian Langbord; 11 (United States) Jeff Hastings; 14 (Israel) Orr Gottlieb; 19 (Canada) Josh Matlow; Designated hitters: Currently unknown	Manager: - (United States) Steve Hertz; Coaches: 11 (United States) Jeff Hastings; 30 (Israel) Dan Rothem; Suspended list: Currently vacant
