= Israel Baseball League =

Professional baseball league in Israel

- Sport: Baseball
- Founded: 2007
- First season: 2007
- Folded: 2007
- No. of teams: 5
- Country: Israel
- Last champion: Bet Shemesh Blue Sox
- Website: baseball.org.il/en/

The Israel Baseball League (IBL; Hebrew: ליגת הבייסבול הישראלית, Ligat ha-Beisbol ha-Israelit) was a five-team professional baseball league in Israel. The first game was played on June 24, 2007. The league was discontinued following its debut season.

== League structure ==
The league's teams were the Team Misgav, Bet Shemesh Blue Sox, Ra'anana Express, Tel Aviv Lightning, and Tel Aviv Academy. Former teams included Netanya Tigers, Petach Tikva Pioneers, and Modi'in Miracle.

The teams played games at four ballparks. The Yarkon Sports Complex, seating 15,000, in the Baptist Village in Petach Tikva, just outside Tel Aviv, was home to the Ra'anana Express and the Tel Aviv teams. Gezer Field, halfway between Jerusalem and Tel Aviv, was home to the Bet Shemesh Blue Sox. The Misgav Sports Complex was used for the Misgav team. Previously, Sportek Baseball Field, in Tel Aviv, was shared by the Tel Aviv Lightning and the Netanya Tigers.

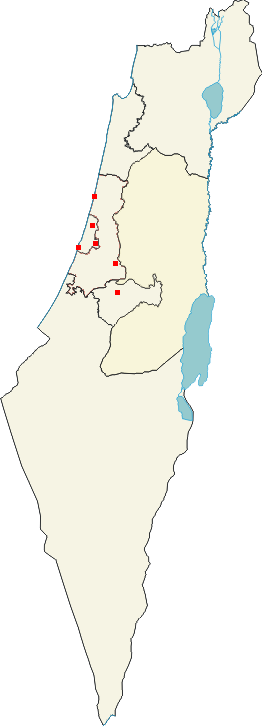

== Players ==
The IBL had 120 players from nine countries in 2007: the United States (77 from 19 states), the Dominican Republic (16), Israel (15), Canada (9), Australia (7), Colombia, Japan, New Zealand, and Ukraine. The league had hoped to be made up of at least 25% Israelis by its fifth year. About 40% of the league was Jewish.

The league held tryouts in 2007 in Los Angeles, Massachusetts, Miami, Israel, and The Dominican Republic. Those selected were current and former U.S. minor leaguers, professional baseball players from other countries, and starting college players.

The first pick in the draft was infielder Aaron Levin, 21, who played for Cuesta College and was selected by Modi'in. The first players signed were outfielder Dan Rootenberg and pitcher Adam Crabb.

former pitcher Sandy Koufax, then 71 years old, was the last player chosen in the draft, by the Modi'in Miracle. "His selection is a tribute to the esteem with which he is held by everyone associated with this league," said team manager Art Shamsky.

After the one IBL season, nine players went on to other professional leagues. These nine players were:

- Eladio Rodriguez, who was signed by the New York Yankees, and in 2008 played for their A+, AA, and AAA teams
- Jason Rees, who also was signed by the New York Yankees
- Maximo Nelson, who signed with the Japanese champion Chunichi Dragons
- Juan Feliciano, who turned down Triple-A offers from the Washington Nationals, Houston Astros, and Pittsburgh Pirates to sign with the Sultanes de Monterrey of the Mexican League
- Adam Crabb, who signed and played with the Adelaide Giants of the Australian Baseball League
- Rafael Bergstrom, who signed and played with the Bridgeport Bluefish of the Atlantic League
- Jason Benson, who signed and played with the Newark Bears of the Atlantic League
- Josh Doane, who was invited to spring training to try out for the Boston Red Sox, and in 2008 hit .278 for Texas of the Continental League
- Michael Olson, who signed with Red Sox but retired due to shoulder injury

== 2007 season ==
The league had an eight-week, 45-game season. Games were seven innings, with a home run hitting contest (a "home run derby") to decide a tie. There were two umpires per game, with three on Sunday nights. Most of the umpires were international, although some were Israeli.

Bet Shemesh (29–12; .707), led by hitters Gregg Raymundo and Jason Rees, had the best regular season record in the league, and finished with a 2.5 game lead over Tel Aviv (26–14; .650), led by pitchers Aaron Pribble and Daniel Kaufman.

On August 19, in Petach Tikva, Ron Blomberg's Bet Shemesh Blue Sox shut out Art Shamsky's Modi'in Miracle 3–0 in the IBL's inaugural championship game. Californian RHP Rafael Bergstrom (7–2, 2.44) pitched a complete-game shutout for Bet Shemesh, downing Dominican RHP Maximo Nelson (5–3, 3.55 ERA) who pitched for Modi'in.

=== Hitting ===
Catcher and former Boston Red Sox minor leaguer Eladio Rodriguez of Modi'in was the league batting champion (.461) and had 16 home runs in 102 at bats, and 23-year-old Australian right fielder Jason Rees led the league with 17 home runs and 50 RBIs in 130 at bats. Rodriguez, 28 years old, and Rees, 24 years old, were both subsequently signed in October to minor league deals by the New York Yankees. Third baseman Gregg Raymundo, who hit .292 in 7 minor league seasons and played for the Texas Rangers' and Pittsburgh Pirates' AAA teams, was a close second in batting with a .459 batting average.

=== Pitching ===
One of the leading pitchers was Juan Feliciano of Beit Shemesh, who had pitched for the 2005–06 Hiroshima Carp in Japan. He was 7–1, with a 1.97 ERA, and in 50.1 innings gave up only 28 hits while striking out 73. 6' 5" lefthander Aaron Pribble of Tel Aviv was 7–2, with a league-leading 1.94 ERA. Rafael Bergstrom was 7–2, with a 2.44 ERA. Daniel Kaufman, who pitched for Emory University, held opposing batters to a .170 batting average. And 6' 6" Maximo Nelson from San Pedro de Macorís in the Dominican Republic, led the league with 85 strikeouts; he pitched for the Gulf Coast Yankees in 2004 (posting a 6–5 record, with a 2.63 ERA). Israel native Shlomo Lipetz (3–1) 1SV 0.98 ERA of Netanya, Mike Etkin (4–0) 2SV of Tel Aviv, and Scott Perlman(3–2) 1SV 1/13 P INH Rr of Bet Shemesh were the league's top relievers.

=== Awards ===
The Hank Greenberg Award for Most Valuable Player was shared by Eladio Rodriguez and Raymundo. The Commissioner's Award for Sportsmanship and Character went to Pribble and infielder Brendan Rubenstein (Ra'anana Express). The Commissioner's Award for Distinguished Service was awarded to shortstop Eric Holtz of Bet Shemesh, a player-coach who filled in as player-manager. The award for best pitcher went to Feliciano, and the Most Valuable Israeli Player was pitcher Dan Rothem of Tel Aviv. In a leaguewide vote of the players (referred to as the 'Schnitzel Awards'), Player of the Year was awarded to Leon Feingold.

== Managers ==
Among the first managers of the IBL were three of the best-known Jewish former major leaguers: Ron Blomberg was the manager of Bet Shemesh. Due to other commitments, Blomberg turned over managerial duties to player/coach Eric Holtz, while Scott Perlman took over as bench coach for several weeks during the middle of the season. Art Shamsky managed Modi'in and Ken Holtzman managed Petach Tikva until he resigned a week before the season ended, and was replaced by Tony Ferrara. In addition, Steve Hertz managed Tel Aviv, Shaun Smith, an Australian, managed Ra'anana, and Ami Baran, an Israeli originally from Chicago, managed Netanya.

== Management ==
The original logo of the Israel Baseball League

The League was the brainchild of Larry Baras, a businessman from Boston.

President and chief operating officer Martin Berger was a Miami trial attorney. The league's director of baseball operations was Dan Duquette, former general manager of the Boston Red Sox and Montreal Expos. Berger and Duquette were involved in selecting the inaugural season players. Bob Ruxin was director of business operations; Ruxin has served as vice president of a sports products and management business. Leon Klarfeld was director of Israeli operations; he is a resident of Even-Yehuda, and had been involved in Israeli Baseball for over 20 years, was the president of the Israel Association of Baseball (IAB) between 1994 and 2002, and is a certified umpire for the Confederation of European Baseball. Jeremy Baras was the director of game (fan) experience.

The Commissioner was Dan C. Kurtzer, former U.S. Ambassador to Israel and Egypt. The league's Board of Advisors included: Bud Selig (Major League Baseball Commissioner), Wendy Selig-Prieb (former Milwaukee Brewers owner), Marshall Glickman (former president of the NBA Portland Trail Blazers), professor Andrew Zimbalist (baseball economist), Marvin Goldklang (minority owner of the New York Yankees and principal owner of four minor league teams), Randy Levine (Yankees president), and Marty Appel (former Yankees public relations director).

On November 15, 2007, Kurtzer and nine advisory board members, including Zimbalist, Goldklang, Levine, and Appel, resigned. They commended Baras for having the vision to bring professional baseball to Israel. However, in their letter of resignation, summing up the concerns of all, Goldklang and Zimbalist wrote that: "it has become apparent that the business leadership of the league has ceased to perform in an effective, constructive or responsible manner and has failed to manage its capital and other resources in a manner likely to produce successful results." The advisers who resigned said the league was unwilling to provide financial information. Berger, the league president, said: "They were asking us for things that we didn't have yet. We haven't done our financials for this year. We are upset and disappointed that they're leaving, but we are going ahead for next year. We have been talking to people who potentially are going to purchase the teams."

== Media coverage ==
PBS aired the opening game, which had attendance of 3,112, on a one-week delay (July 1, 2007), in Boston, New York, Chicago, Washington D.C., Los Angeles, and Miami. MLB.com carried coverage of the league's games.

Aaron Pribble, who pitched for the Tel Aviv Lightning, kept a journal of his summer in the league. He later wrote a book about his experience, Pitching in the Promised Land.

== See also ==
- Baseball in Israel
- Israel national baseball team
