= Gael Grunewald =

Gael Grunewald (born 18 December 1964) is the Head of the Department of Education at the World Zionist Organization. He previously served as the Head of the Settlement Division of the World Zionist Organization and as the Deputy Chairman of KKL. Grunewald also held the position of Secretary General of World Bnei Akiva.

Grunewald was born in France and grew up in Paris. After graduating from the Etz-Haim Yeshiva in Switzerland, he made Aliyah to Israel and joined the IDF. Following his military service, he returned to France to teach and coordinate the Bnei Akiva youth movements. He later moved back to Israel to pursue a degree in computer engineering and science teaching. During this period, he worked for five years with World Bnei Akiva and managed the Jewish Agency's Counselors Training Institute.

== Life and career ==
Grunewald served as the Jewish Agency representative in Europe for four years and was an educational advisor for the European Rabbis Committee. After his term, he was elected Secretary General of World Bnei Akiva and chaired the Youth Movements World Council. In 2006, he joined the executive of the World Zionist Organization and headed the WZO Hagshama Department. He also chaired the Beit-Shemesh / Washington / South Africa Partnership 2000 and the Vaad Amuta of World Bnei Akiva, and he serves on several other organizational boards.

In addition to his roles in the World Zionist Organization, Grunewald is the chairman of Zurba Merabana, The High Institute for Halach Studies, which has 200 chapters in Israel and the Diaspora. He was elected as a board member in June 2011, having previously served on the board from 2001 to 2010. In January 2012, he became the Deputy Chairman of KKL, and in October 2015, he was elected Chairman of the Settlement Division of the World Zionist Organization. Following the coalition agreement of the 38th World Zionist Congress in November 2020, Grunewald was appointed Deputy Chairman of the World Zionist Organization and Chairman of the Department of Education.

Gael Grunewald was born in France and grew up in Paris. After graduating the Etz-Haim Yeshiva in Switzerland; he made Aliyah and joined the IDF and after a military service he returned to France for teaching and coordinating the Bnei Akiva youth movements. Following that, he came back to Israel and studied for a computer engineering degree and a degree in science teaching. He worked for five years for World Bnei Akiva and also managed the Jewish Agency's Counselors Training Institute.

For four years Grunewald served as the Jewish Agency representative in Europe and was also an educational advisor for the European Rabbis Committee. At the end of the term he was elected secretary general of World Bnei Akiva and as chair of the Youth Movements World Council. In 2006 he was elected for the World Zionist Organization executive and served as the head of the WZO Hagshama Department. In addition, he served as chair of the Beit-Shemesh / Washington / South Africa Partnership 2000 and chair of the Vaad Amuta of world Bnei Akiva; he serves as a member and chair in several organizations dealing with different areas.

Grunewald is the chairman of Zurba Merabana, The High institute for Halach Studies. Zurba Merabana has 200 chapters in Israel and the Diaspora.

Grunewald was elected as a board member in June 2011. previously he served on the board from 2001 through 2010.

In January 2012 Grunewald was elected as deputy chairman of KKL.

In October 2015 he was elected chairman of the Settlement Division of the World Zionist Organization.

In November 2020, following the coalition agreement of the 38th World Zionist Congress, Gael was appointed deputy chairman of the World Zionist Organization and chairman of the Department of Education at the World Zionist Organization.

Gael is married to Shira and they have 7 Children. They live in Bet Shemesh.
