= Shmuel Greenberg =

Mayor of Beit Shemesh, Israel

- שמואל גרינברג
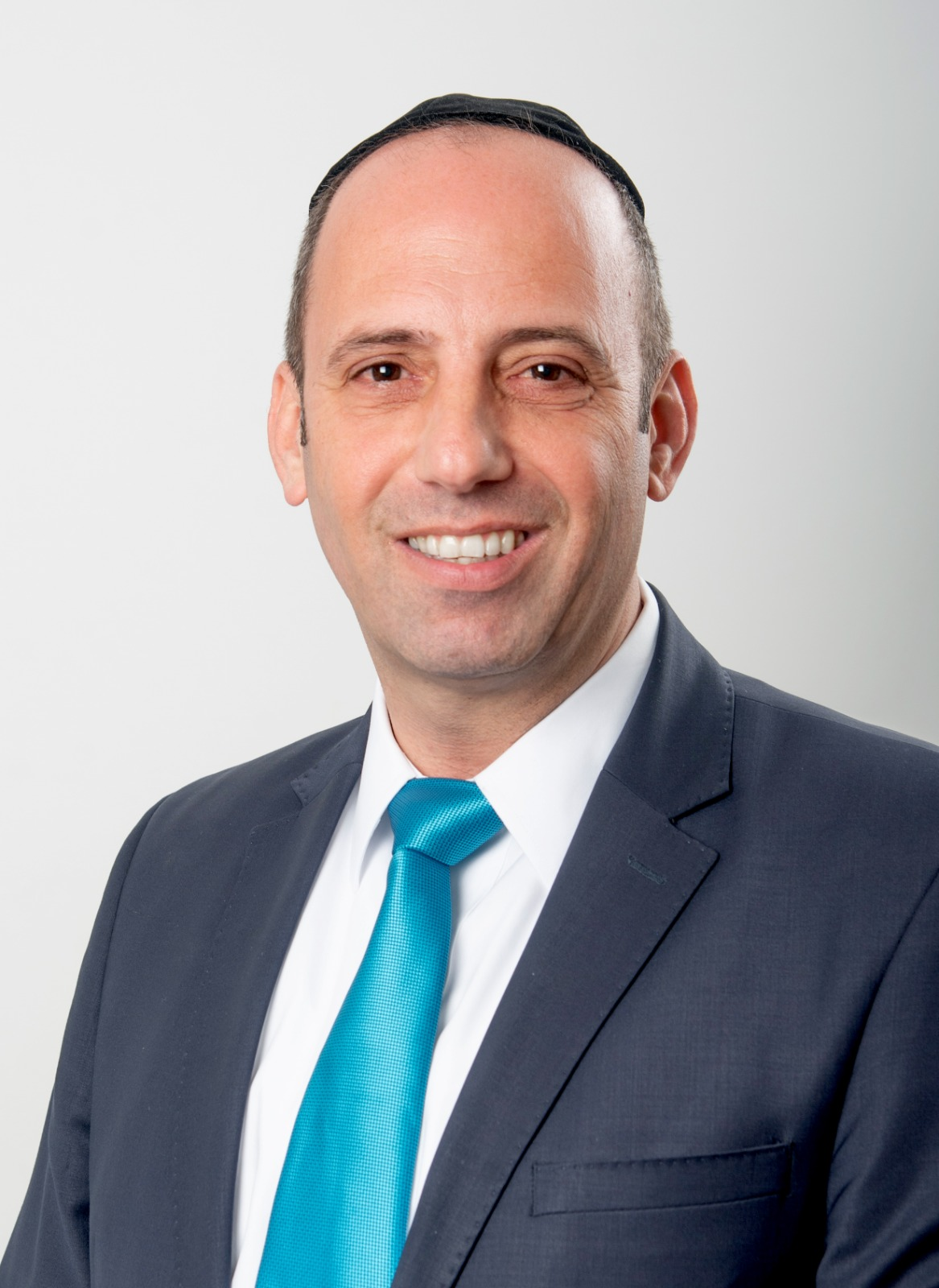

Mayor of Beit Shemesh
- Incumbent
- Assumed office 31 March 2024
- Preceded by: Aliza Bloch

Director of the Haredi Education Department at the Jerusalem Municipality
- In office 2020–2023

Deputy Mayor of Beit Shemesh
- In office 2008–2018

Personal details
- Born: 22 December 1975 (age 50) Rekhasim, Israel
- Party: Degel HaTorah

Shmuel "Shmulik" Greenberg (born 22 December 1975) is an Israeli politician who has served as the mayor of Beit Shemesh since March 2024. He was previously the director of the Haredi Education Department in the Jerusalem Municipality, acting and deputy mayor of Beit Shemesh on behalf of the Degel HaTorah party.

== Biography ==
Greenberg was born and raised in Rekhasim, Israel. He studied at the Tashbar Rekhasim Elementary School and Talmud Torah Torat Emet in Haifa and later at the Kfar Hasidim Yeshiva. He served in Unit 995 in the IDF.

Greenberg is a graduate of the Ono Academic College in law and holds a master's degree in public policy from the Hebrew University of Jerusalem. In addition, he holds a teaching certificate, is a graduate of a mediation course, and is a graduate of the Mandel Institute's Management and Leadership Program.

== Career ==
After his marriage, he moved to Panama for about a year for a teaching mission in the country's Jewish community. From there, he moved to the city of Beit Shemesh, where he worked as a teacher and director of educational institutions.

In 2003, he was appointed director of the Haredi Department in the Beit Shemesh Municipality. Following the decision of then-mayor Danny Vaknin to fire the Haredi employees in the municipality, Greenberg was appointed parliamentary assistant to MK Moshe Gafni. In the 2008 Beit Shemesh Municipal Council elections, the Degel HaTorah party received 4 seats and Greenberg entered the council and was appointed deputy mayor and head of the community centre, positions he held until 2018.

In January 2020, Greenberg resigned from the Beit Shemesh City Council and was appointed Director of the Haredi Education Department in the Jerusalem Municipality. He also won the tender to appoint the Ministry of Transport and Road Safety's advisor to the Haredi sector, but was rejected by the tenders committee.

=== Mayor of Beit Shemesh ===
On 25 June 2023, the Degel Hatorah party announced that Greenberg would run on its behalf for mayor of Beit Shemesh. Running against Greenberg were incumbent Aliza Bloch, from the Beit Shemesh United Party, and Deputy Minister of Agriculture Moshe Abutbul, from the Shas Party.

In the elections held on 27 February 2024, Greenberg won the most votes, garnering 35.7% of the vote, but did not cross the threshold required for victory, which was 40%. He faced Aliza Bloch in the second round of elections held on 10 March. Ahead of this round of elections, all of the city's ultra-Orthodox parties announced their support for his candidacy. He won the election with 57.92% of the vote and took office on 31 March.

On 20 March 2025, Greenberg and his family were attacked by Haredi extremists. One of his sons was injured during the attack.

== Personal life ==
Greenberg is married and has five children. He lives in Beit Shemesh.
