= Unity (Israel) =

Political party

Unity האחדות
- Leader: Gilad Erdan
- Founder: Gilad Erdan; Yuli Edelstein
- Founded: 6 August 2026
- Split from: Likud
- Ideology: Conservatism (Israeli); Economic liberalism; Zionism
- Political position: Right-wing
- Colours: Blue; Light blue Olive green
- Knesset: 0 / 120

Website
- haachdut.org.il

Unity (Hebrew: האחדות, romanized: HaAchdut) was a right-wing political party in Israel which was founded in August 2026 by Yuli Edelstein and Gilad Erdan, ahead of the 2026 Israeli legislative election. The party withdrew from the election in early September 2026.

== Background and founding ==
Yuli Edelstein, who served as the chair of the Knesset's Foreign Affairs and Defense Committee, was removed from the position in July 2025 after he refused to support a bill which would have allowed many Ultra-Orthodox to be exempt from the draft.

Gilad Erdan, who served as a minister, confirmed in early May 2026 that he was considering forming a new party. Edelstein and Erdan were in talks in late May regarding the potential formation of a new party.

He and Erdan launched a new party on 6 August 2026 in Tel Aviv. Erdan stated that the party would form a "broad Zionist government" and would be in favor of a broad draft that included all people. Erdan will lead the party.

Former Beit Shemesh mayor Aliza Bloch joined the party on 10 August. The name of the party, Unity, was unveiled the following day. Oren Smadja joined the party on 12 August. On 13 August, it was reported that several Likud MKs were considering defecting to Unity after the former party decided to ban incumbent MKs from running on Likud regional district spots in the 2026 Likud primary leading up to the 2026 legislative election.

== 2026 election campaign and withdrawal ==
Erdan said in an interview in early September that Unity was considering allying with other parties to reach the electoral threshold.

Erdan held unsuccessful talks with Benny Gantz of Blue and White over a possible alliance on 4 September; Erdan announced the same day that Unity withdrew from the election, citing poor polling that left the party below the electoral threshold, an unwillingness by the public to accept a unity government, and unfruitful alliance negotiations.

== Election results ==
Election	Leader	Votes	%	Seats	+/−	Government
2026	Gilad Erdan	Withdrew		0 / 120	0	Extra-parliamentary
