= Artuf =

Artuf عرتوف
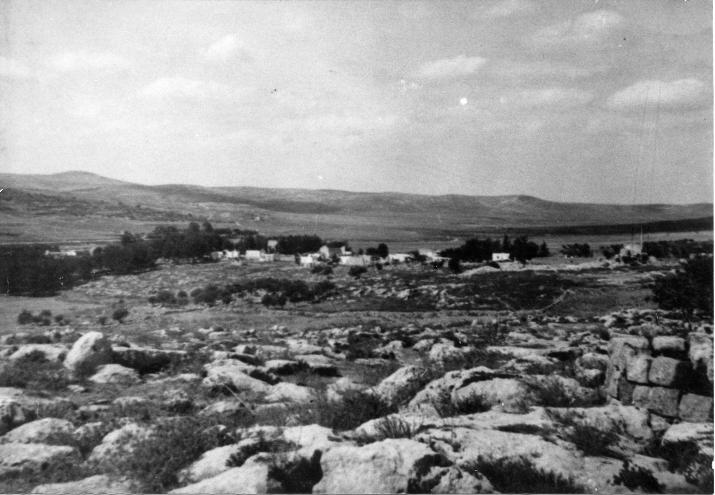
- Artuf July 1948. Shortly before it was destroyed by the Harel Brigade
- Etymology: Artuf; personal name
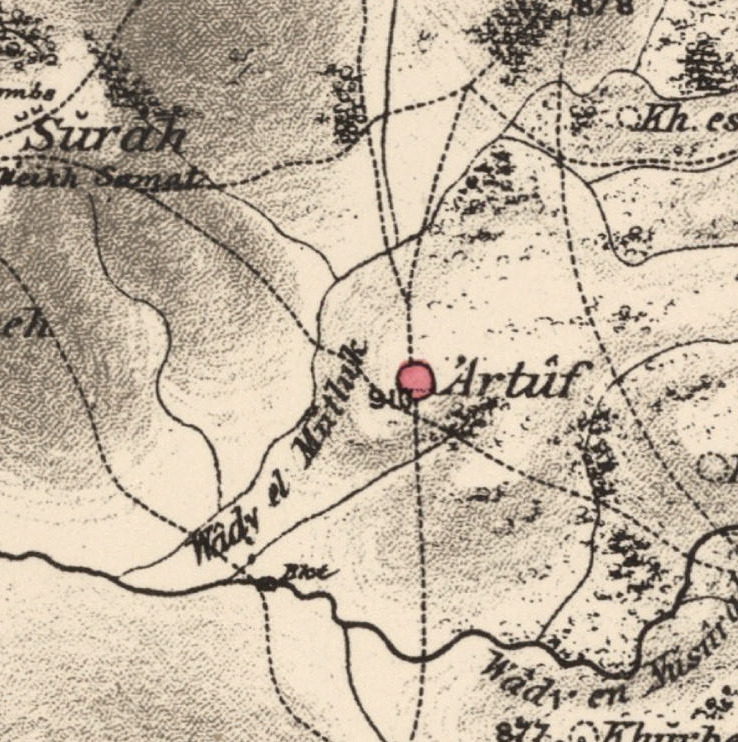
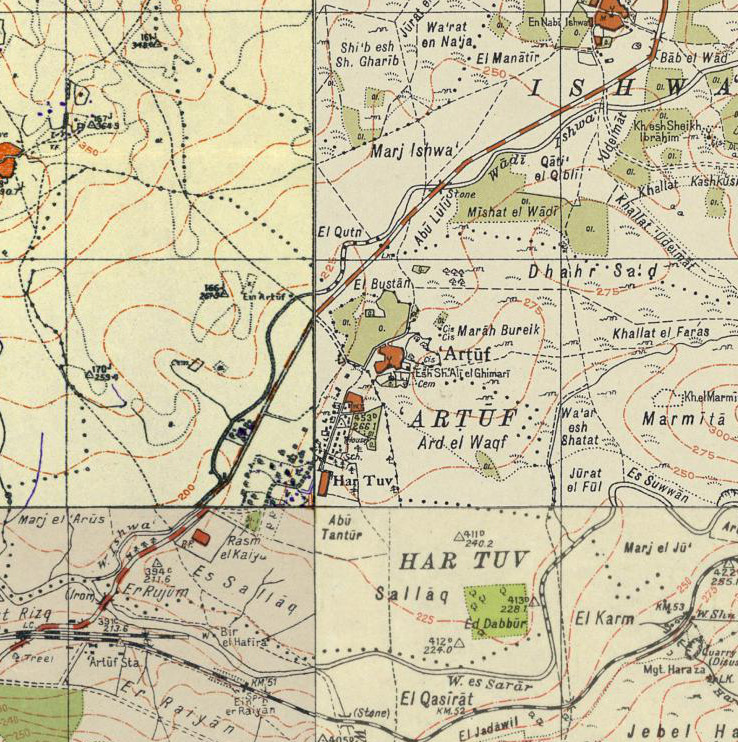
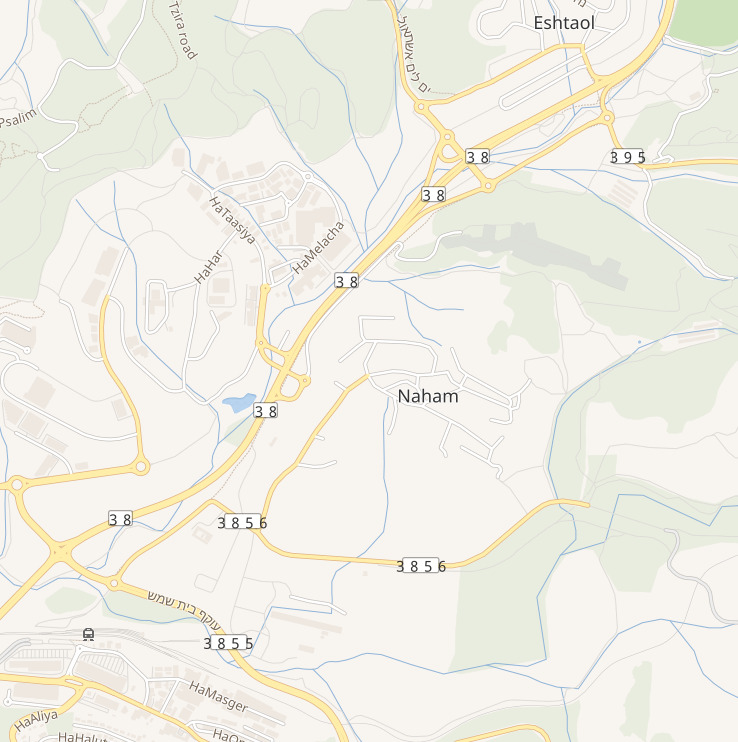
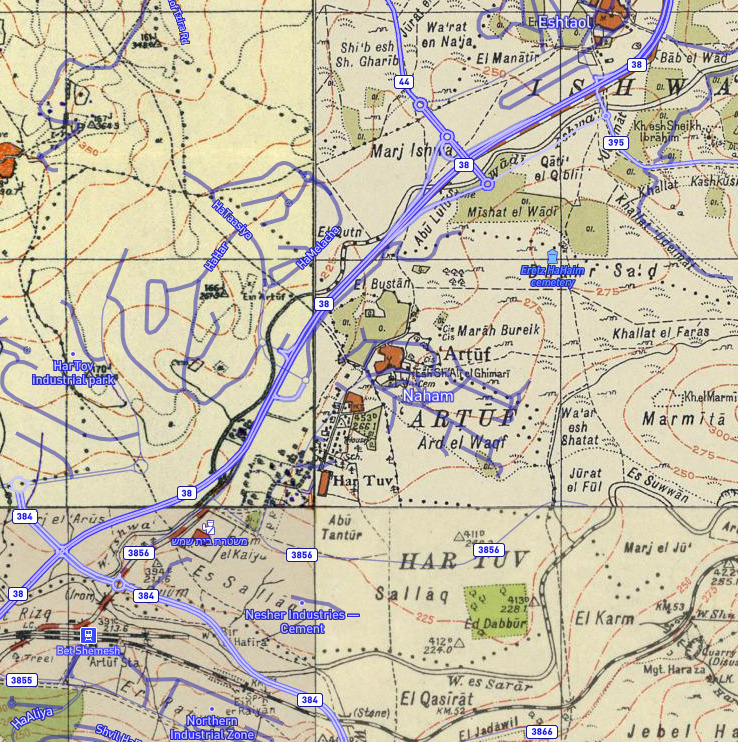
- 1870s map 1940s map modern map 1940s with modern overlay map A series of historical maps of the area around Artuf (click the buttons)

- Location within Mandatory Palestine
- Coordinates: 31°46′03″N 35°00′05″E
- Palestine grid: 150/130
- Geopolitical entity: Mandatory Palestine
- Subdistrict: Jerusalem
- Date of depopulation: 18 July 1948

Area
  - Total: 403 dunams (40.3 ha; 100 acres)

Population (1945)
  - Total: 350
- Cause(s) of depopulation: Military assault by Yishuv forces
- Current Localities: Naham

Artuf (Arabic: عرتوف) was a Palestinian village in the Jerusalem foothills depopulated in 1948. It was situated 21.5 kilometers (13.4 mi) west of Jerusalem on a high plateau, surrounded by plains on the south, east, and west. The village was on a secondary road that linked it to the main road to Jerusalem.

== History ==
=== Ottoman Empire ===
Under the Ottoman Empire, in 1596, Artuf was a village in a nahiya ("subdistrict") of Ramla, part of Liwa of Gaza with a population of 110. The villagers paid taxes on a number of crops, including wheat, barley and fruit, as well as on goats, beehives and vineyards.

In 1863 Victor Guérin found the village to be situated on a small hill, and having 150 inhabitants.

Socin found from an official Ottoman village list from about 1870 that Artuf had 14 houses and a population of 40, though the population count included men only. It was also noted that it was half hour from Sar'a. Hartmann found that Artuf had 140 houses.

The PEF's Survey of Western Palestine in 1883 described Artuf as "a small village built on a low hill, with an open valley to the west. There is a pool (Hufiret Artuf) in the valley, whence the village obtains its water. Olive trees occur round the place.

In 1883, a group of English missionaries purchased land in Artuf to establish an agricultural colony, called Hartuv, for Jews whom they hoped to convert to Christianity. When the settlers refused to convert, the project was abandoned. It was resettled in 1895, but destroyed in the 1929 riots.

In 1896 the population of Artuf was estimated to be about 135 persons.

=== British Mandate era ===
Most houses were built of stone and adobe; a few were built of stone and cement and had domed roofs. The villagers, who were all Muslims, worshipped in a mosque called the al-Umari Mosque, perhaps in reference to the second Muslim caliph, Umar ibn al-Khattab. The tomb of a local Muslim sage named Shaykh ´Ali al-Ghimadi stood on the outskirts of the village. About half of the villagers worked in agriculture, while the rest worked in the nearby Bab al-Wad station, on the Jaffa–Jerusalem railway. The agricultural land extended west of the village, where fruit trees and almond trees were planted.

In the 1922 census of Palestine Artuf had a population 181 Muslims, while nearby Hartuv had a population of 124 Jews, changing in the 1931 census to 253; 252 Muslims and 1 Jew.

In the 1944/45 statistics, the village had a population of 350 Muslims, and 403 dunams of land. A total of 61 dunums were irrigated or used for orchards, 279 dunams were for cereals, while 18 dunams were built-up (urban) land.

=== 1948 Arab–Israeli War and after ===
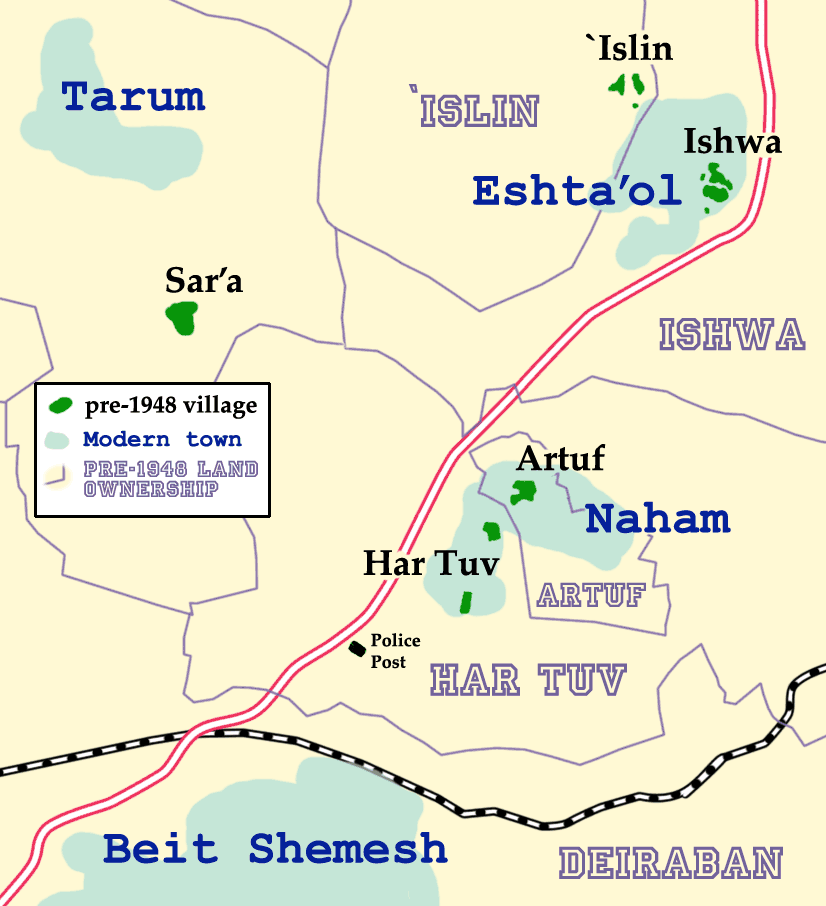
The region of Artuf in its historical setting.

Artuf, along with four other villages, were overtaken by the Israeli Harel Brigade on 17–18 July 1948 in Operation Dani. The villages had been on the front line since April 1948 and most of the inhabitants of these villages had already left the area. Many of those who stayed fled when Israeli forces attacked and the few who remained at each village were expelled.

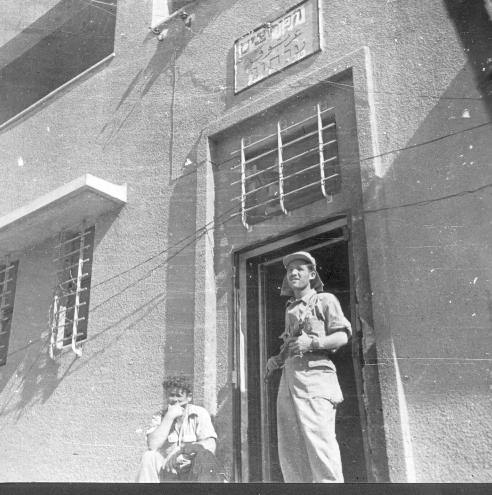
Members of Harel Brigade outside Artuf police station, 1948

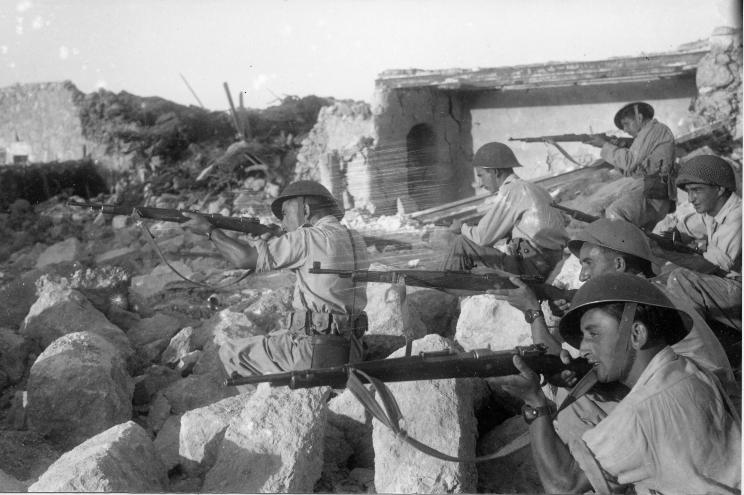
Members of Harel Brigade, 6th Battalion, Company B, training in the ruins of Artuf. July 1948

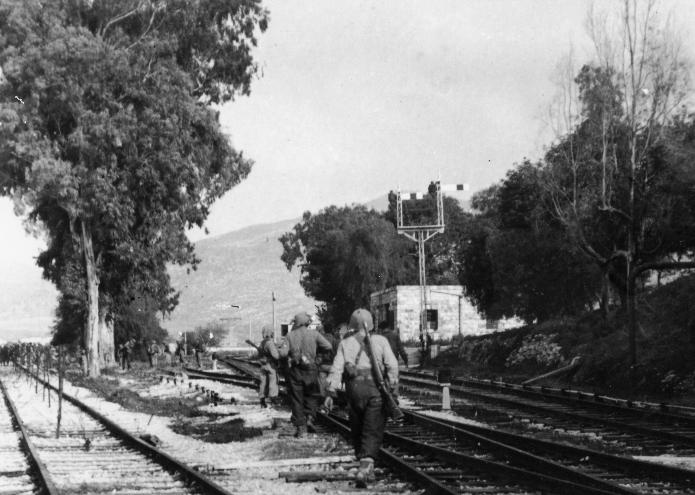
Artuf train station 1948

After the establishment of the State of Israel, a ma'abara transit camp was established on the site for Jewish immigrants, and a cement factory was opened to provide employment. In 1950, Moshav Naham was built on Hartuv's land.

According to the Palestinian historian Walid Khalidi, the village remaining structures in 1992 were: "One stone house, located outside the Jewish settlement of Nacham, has been expanded, and is now inhabited by a Jewish family. In the middle of the Jewish settlement is a small stone house that is used as a warehouse; it stands by the site of the former mosque. On the western slopes of the site is a circular structure with no roof that was formerly used as a lime kiln (kabbara). The village cemetery, to the west, has been levelled; only one or two graves remain on its eastern edge. Part of the British police headquarters is still standing. Elsewhere, the village site is covered with scattered stone rubble. Olive, fig, and cypress trees grow on the village site, especially in the west and north."

== Archaeology ==
Two archaeological sites nearby are Khirbat Marmita, about 1 km east of the village, and al-Burj, on the site of Hartuv to the southwest. Excavations have been carried out on Khirbat al-Burj by the Hebrew University since 1985. Excavations in Hartuv revealed an architectural complex dating to the Early Bronze 1 period. The site includes a central courtyard surrounded by rooms on at least three sides. One of the rooms, a rectangular hall with pillar bases along its long axis, may have been a sanctuary with a line of standing stones (massebot). Another hall has a monumental entrance flanked by two monolithic doorjambs. The complex appears to have had both religious and secular functions.

== See also ==
- Depopulated Palestinian locations in Israel

== Bibliography ==
- Barron, J. B., ed. (1923). Palestine: Report and General Abstracts of the Census of 1922. Government of Palestine.
- Conder, C.R.; Kitchener, H. H. (1883). The Survey of Western Palestine: Memoirs of the Topography, Orography, Hydrography, and Archaeology. Vol. 3. London: Committee of the Palestine Exploration Fund.
- Department of Statistics (1945). Village Statistics, April, 1945. Government of Palestine.
- Guérin, V. (1869). Description Géographique Historique et Archéologique de la Palestine (in French). Vol. 1: Judee, pt. 2. Paris: L'Imprimerie Nationale.
- Hadawi, S. (1970). Village Statistics of 1945: A Classification of Land and Area ownership in Palestine. Palestine Liberation Organization Research Centre.
- Hartmann, M. (1883). "Die Ortschaftenliste des Liwa Jerusalem in dem türkischen Staatskalender für Syrien auf das Jahr 1288 der Flucht (1871)". Zeitschrift des Deutschen Palästina-Vereins. 6: 102–149.
- Hütteroth, W.-D.; Abdulfattah, K. (1977). Historical Geography of Palestine, Transjordan and Southern Syria in the Late 16th Century. Erlanger Geographische Arbeiten, Sonderband 5. Erlangen, Germany: Vorstand der Fränkischen Geographischen Gesellschaft. ISBN 978-3-920405-41-4.
- Khalidi, W. (1992). All That Remains: The Palestinian Villages Occupied and Depopulated by Israel in 1948. Washington, D.C.: Institute for Palestine Studies. ISBN 978-0-88728-224-9.
- Mills, E., ed. (1932). Census of Palestine 1931. Population of Villages, Towns and Administrative Areas. Jerusalem: Government of Palestine.
- Morris, B. (2004). The Birth of the Palestinian Refugee Problem Revisited. Cambridge University Press. ISBN 978-0-521-00967-6.
- Palmer, E. H. (1881). The Survey of Western Palestine: Arabic and English Name Lists Collected During the Survey by Lieutenants Conder and Kitchener, R. E. Transliterated and Explained by E.H. Palmer. Committee of the Palestine Exploration Fund.
- Schick, C. (1896). "Zur Einwohnerzahl des Bezirks Jerusalem". Zeitschrift des Deutschen Palästina-Vereins. 19: 120–127.
- Socin, A. (1879). "Alphabetisches Verzeichniss von Ortschaften des Paschalik Jerusalem". Zeitschrift des Deutschen Palästina-Vereins. 2: 135–163.
