= Hartuv =

Agricultural colony in the Judean Hills (1883-1948)

Coordinates: 31°45′53″N 34°59′59″E

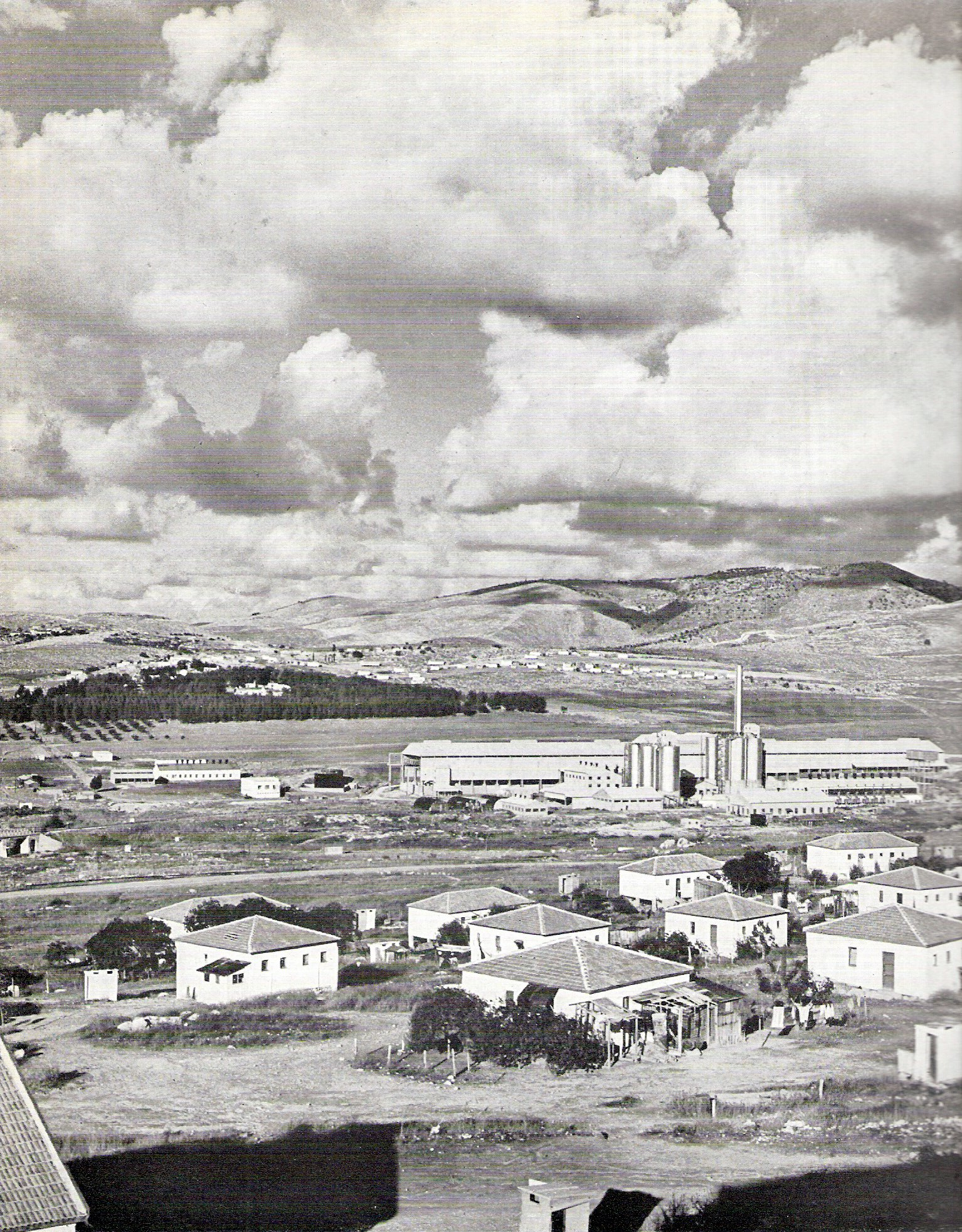
Hartuv in the Judean hills

Hartuv (Hebrew: הרטוב), Arabic: ارتون) or Har-Tuv (lit. 'Mount of Goodness') was an agricultural colony in the Judean Hills established in 1882 on land purchased from the Arab village of Artuf by English missionaries. It was destroyed in the 1929 Palestine riots but was rebuilt in 1930. In 1948 it was abandoned again. Hartuv was the starting point for the Convoy of 35 during the 1948 war. Hartuv is now an industrial zone near Beit Shemesh.

== History ==
=== Financial Difficulties circa 1882 ===
Yehuda Appel writes in 1922 that an unnamed manuscript was found, dated circa 1882 or prior stating: "..And the people of Artuf village owed money to the government. There were some years of drought that could not pay the wealth. (the tax) and the wealth in those good days was not only 12 percent of the grain, because the Turkish government was not specific so much with the farmers' taxes, and according to the assessor's estimate they sometimes had to pay 20 percent and more. Apart from that, they were not allowed to touch the threshing floor before the appraiser arrived, whom he drove slowly from village to village. And after all this the time was not yet complete, because after the first appraiser the villagers had to wait a long time until the great appraiser who was in charge of his back came with good luck and the wealth debt (the tax) to the government increased and increased year by year, until a vigorous order came to collect the debt is valid. Then the soldiers appeared in the village, arrested the old men who belonged to them, and hung them by their feet in the big fig tree near the threshing floor and began to gather thorns and thistles to light a fire and torture their souls until they paid the debt... and they found a savior angel who saved them (at the very last moment...), From this horrible death, one Effendi (it turns out that it was Iskander Effendi, the Spanish deputy consul from Jerusalem who suddenly appeared at the very last moment...). The consul therefore paid the debt and in return received all the village lands, about 4500 dunams. The Arabs do not know (so it is written) whether the appearance of the savior angel was by chance... or if it was premeditated... but at that time they had great joy..."

Maoz Haviv, a regional researcher from Kibbutz Tzora notes that: In 1881, following disturbances among the Russian Jews after the assassination of the Tsar, which were named "Storms in the Negev", Yehiel Ben Rabbi Yehuda Leib began to work for bringing Jews to agricultural settlement in Israel. In the Polish city of Radom, he recruited 11 heads of families, all of them Jewish farmers who worked the land, and together with them he returned and immigrated to Israel to establish an agricultural colony here."

The purchase, which was finalized in 1883 did not go through because the eleven families were concerned about the isolated location.

=== Christian missionary colony (1882–1891) ===
In the early 1880s, the Spanish consul in Jerusalem bought over 5,000 dunams (5.0 km^{2}; 1.9 sq mi) of land from the villagers of Artuf, which he sold to the London Society for Promoting Christianity Amongst the Jews. After the 1882 anti-Jewish pogroms in Eastern Europe, the society used some of the money raised to help the Jewish refugees to purchase land in Artuf. Towards the end of 1883, 24 Jewish families were settled there, each receiving 150 dunams of farmland, farm animals and tools. Due to economic difficulties and the lack of water, some of the land was leased to Arabs. After living for some time in tents, a wooden hut was built where all the families lived together. They were obliged to attend Sunday meetings and send their children to the missionary school, but most of the colonists remained practicing Jews.

=== Har-Tuv colony (1895–1929) ===
In 1895, the Bulgarian Hibbat Zion movement bought the 5,000-dunam farm from the London Jews Society and renamed it Har-Tuv (lit. Mountain of Good). Twelve Jewish families settled there and tried to earn a living from agriculture. Due to the poor quality of the soil, and lack of water, seeds and work implements, life in Hartuv was a struggle.

In his 1912-13 literary almanac, Luah le'eretz yisrael, historian Abraham Moses Luncz wrote: "Artuf (Har-Tuv), founded in 1895, about 10 minutes from D'ieban along the route of the Jerusalem-Yafo railroad, 101 inhabitants, Sephardi Jews of Bulgarian origin."

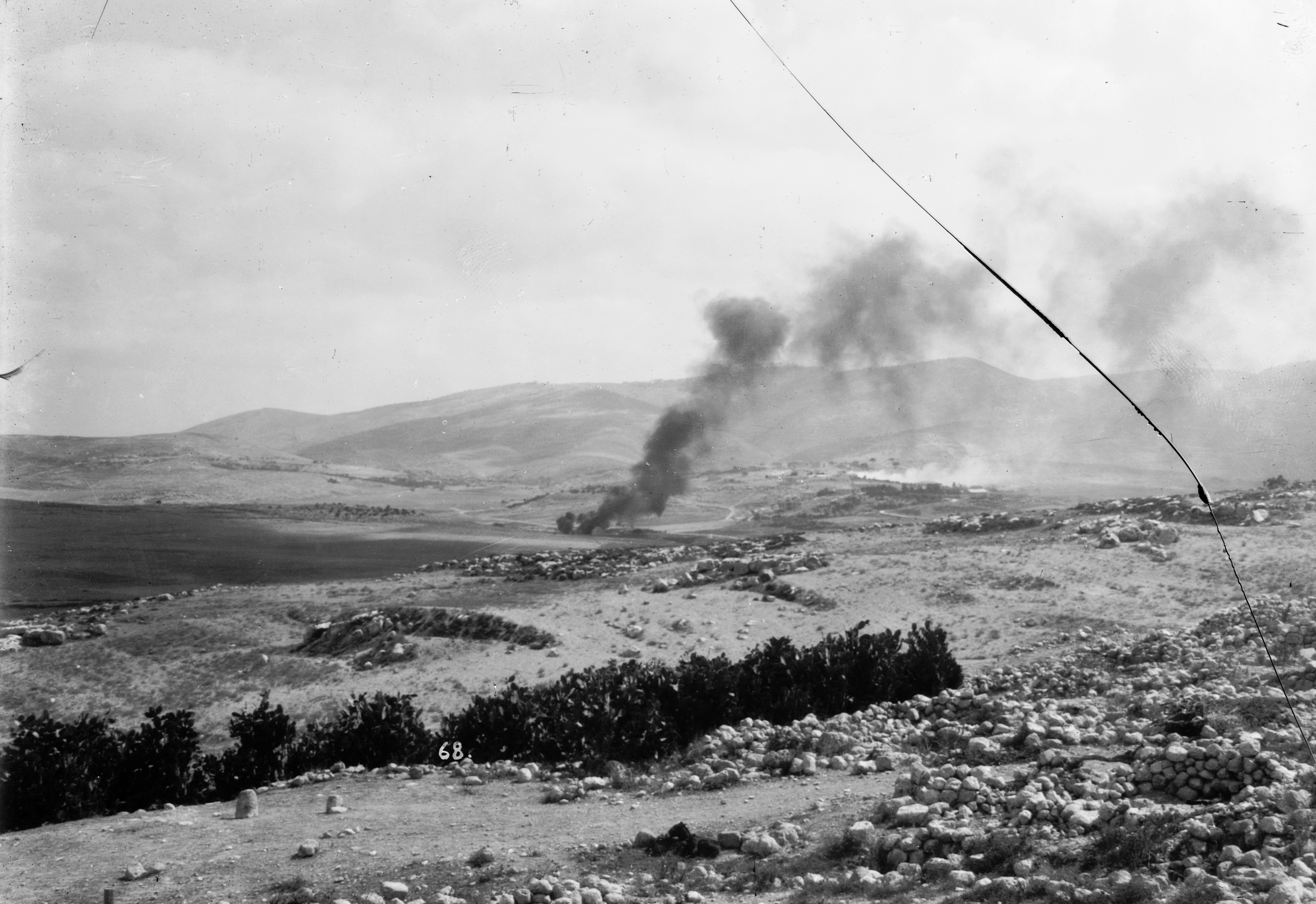
The Jewish colony set on fire during the 1929 Palestine riots

During the 1929 Palestine riots Hartuv was destroyed by Arabs, who had surrounded a two-story building with 125 residents who, with the help of defenders who had been sent to help defend the community, were able to hold out until British forces arrived. After the school was destroyed and homes looted, residents fled the sommunity. Invoking the Collective Punishments Ordinance, the British Mandatory authorities heavily fined the Arab villages whose residents attacked the Jews of Hartuv.

=== New Har-Tuv and the War of Independence (1930–1948) ===
In 1930 Hartuv was rebuilt and some of the families returned.

According to a 1931 census conducted by the British Mandate authorities, Har Tuv had a population of 107 inhabitants, in 24 inhabited houses.

On 20 December 1947, a Notrim truck on its way to Hartuv was attacked and its 3 passengers murdered. Since then all transportation was done in lightly armored vehicles.

The Convoy of 35 left from Hartuv in an attempt to resupply and reinforce the Gush Etzion kibbutzim by foot on January 16, 1948. 35 members of the convoy were killed.

On March 18, 1948, a convoy that had just finished resupplying Hartuv was ambushed on its way back to Jerusalem by the forces of Abd al-Qadir al-Husayni. 11 convoy members were killed in the battle.

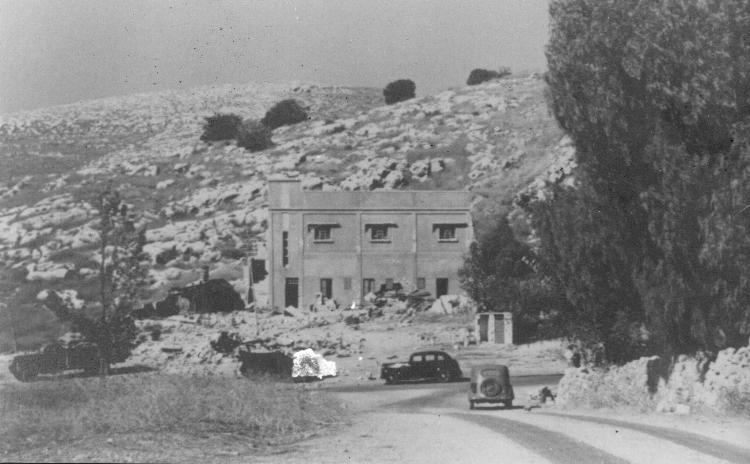
Road to Har Tuv joins the main road to Jerusalem, 1948

=== Moshav Naham ===
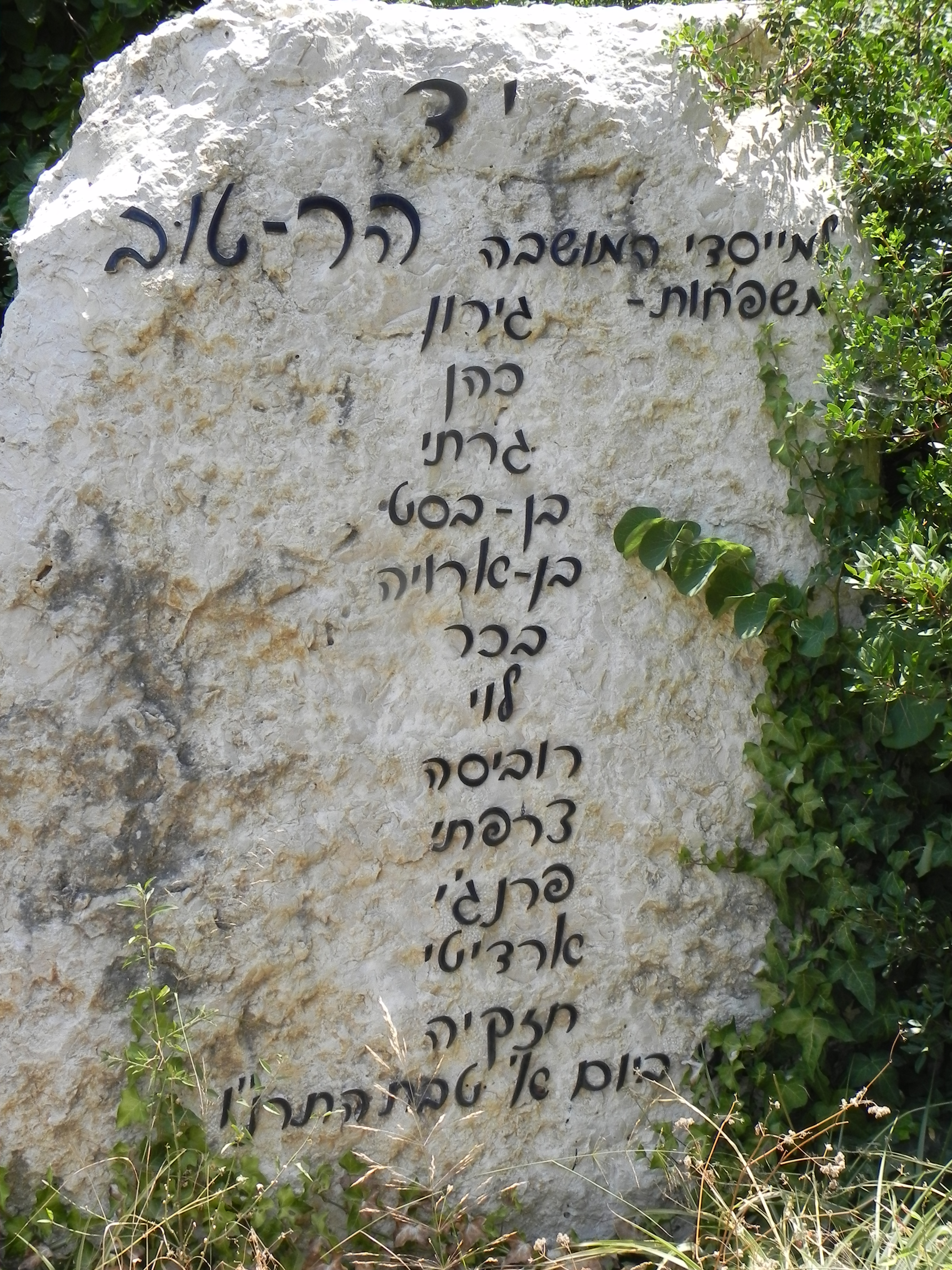
Monument commemorating the founders of Hartuv

After the establishment of the State of Israel, a ma'abara transit camp was set up to accommodate the masses of new immigrants arriving from Europe and Arab lands. In 1950, Moshav Naham was founded nearby.

== Archaeology ==
Two archaeological sites nearby are Khirbat Marmita, about 1 kilometre (0.62 mi) east of the village, and al-Burj, on the site of Hartuv to the southwest. Excavations have been carried out on Khirbat al-Burj by the Hebrew University since 1985. Excavations in Hartuv revealed an architectural complex dating to the Early Bronze Age I period. The site includes a central courtyard surrounded by rooms on at least three sides. One of the rooms, a rectangular hall with pillar bases along its long axis, may have been a sanctuary with a line of standing stones (massebot). Another hall has a monumental entrance flanked by two monolithic doorjambs. The complex appears to have had both religious and secular functions.

== Today ==
Today Hartuv is an industrial zone. Nesher Israel Cement Enterprises, Israel's sole producer of cement, maintains one of its three factories in Hartuv. In 1987, Beit Or Aviva, Israel's first therapeutic community was established in Hartuv.
