= Beit Shemesh =

Beit Shemesh בֵּית שֶׁמֶשׁ
- City

Hebrew transcription(s)
  - ISO 259: Beit Šemš
  - Also spelled: Bet Shemesh (official)
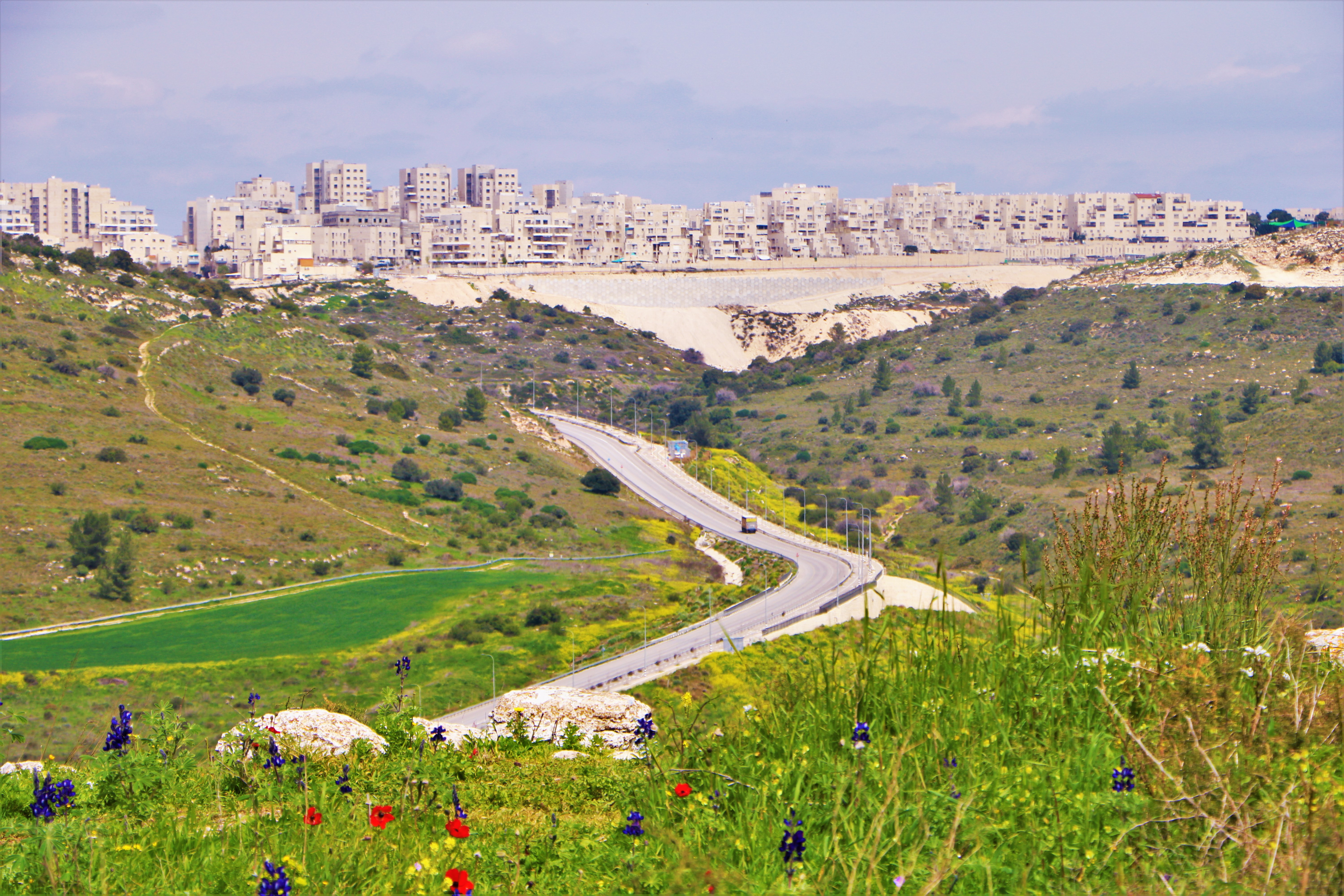
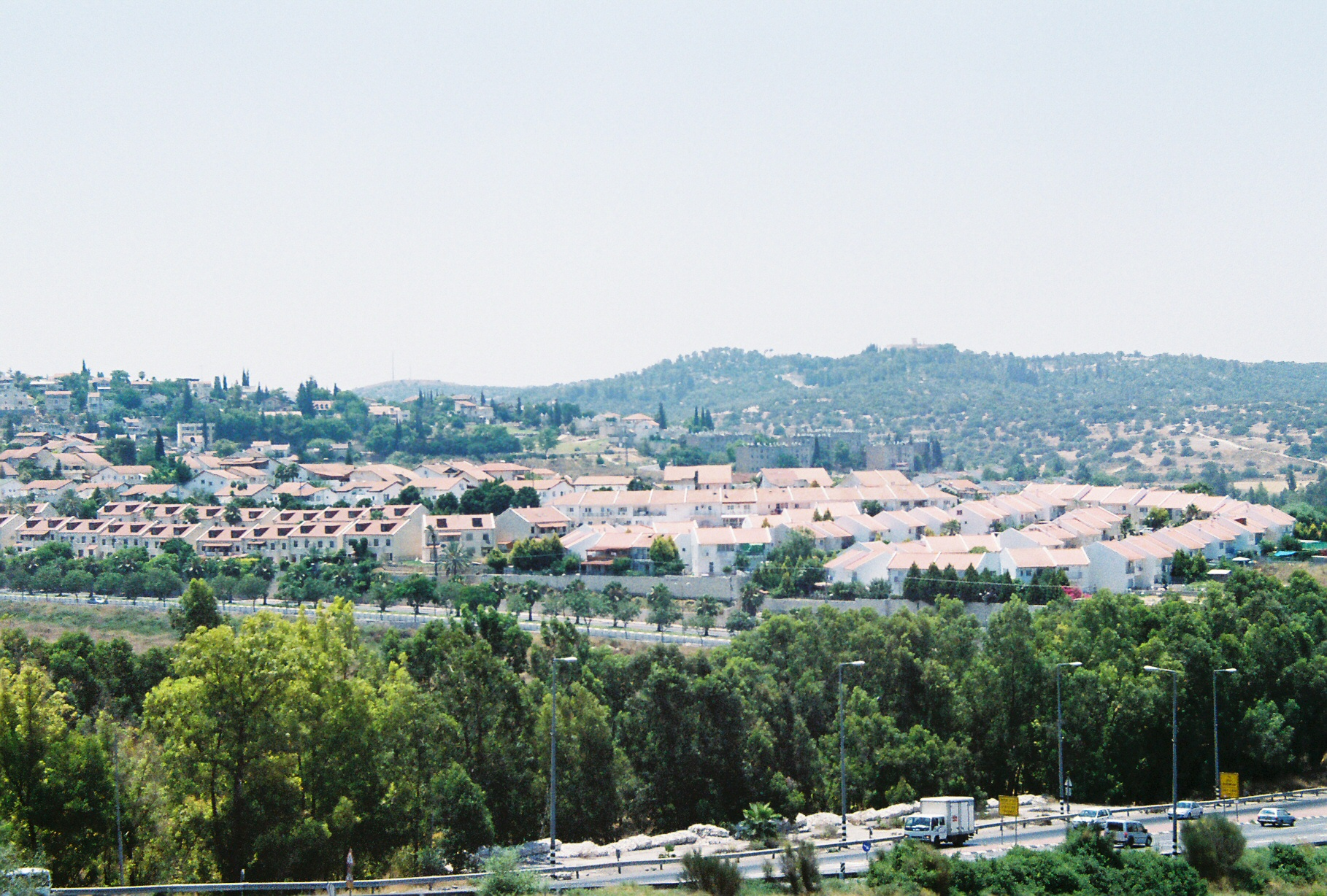
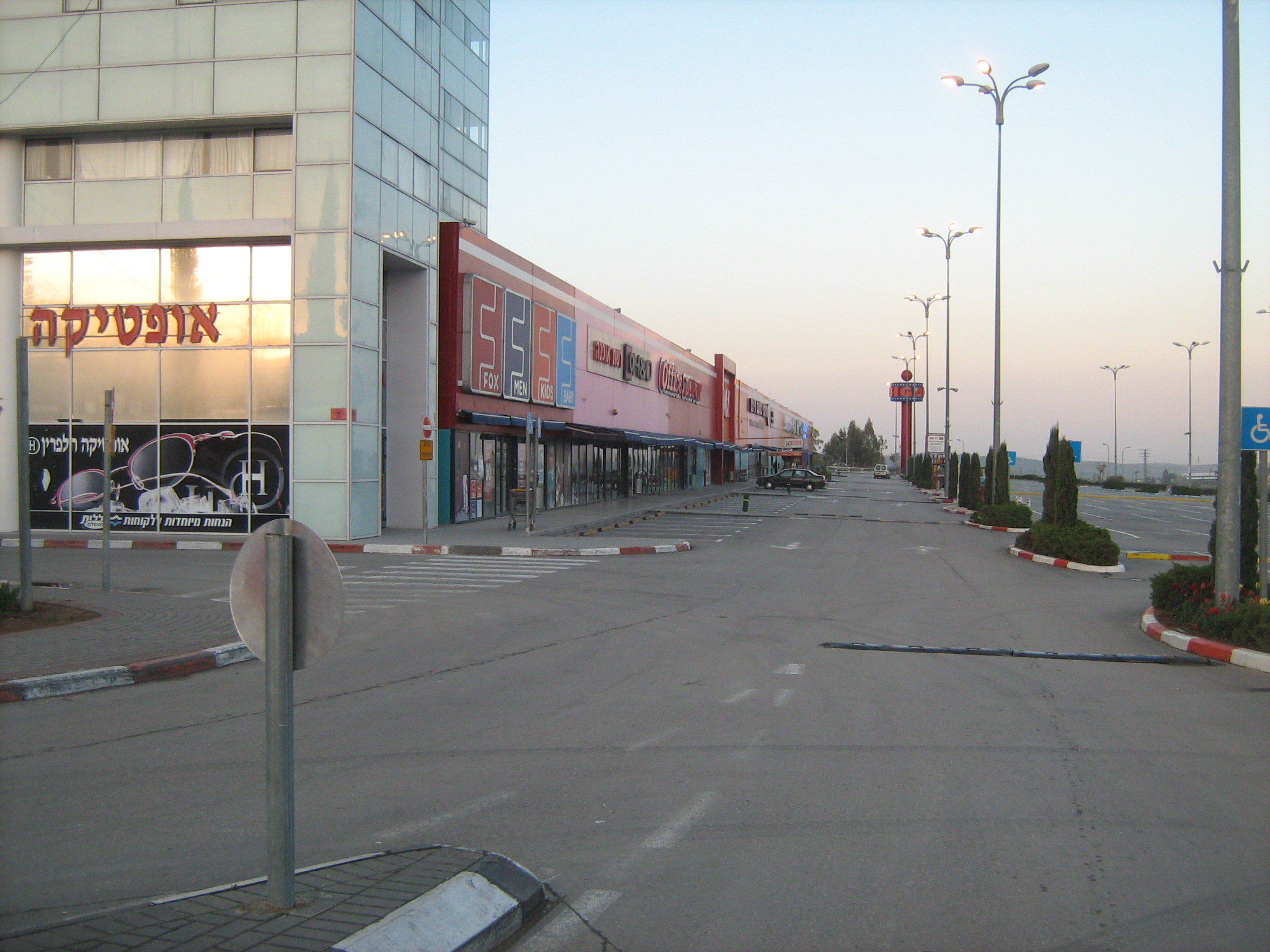
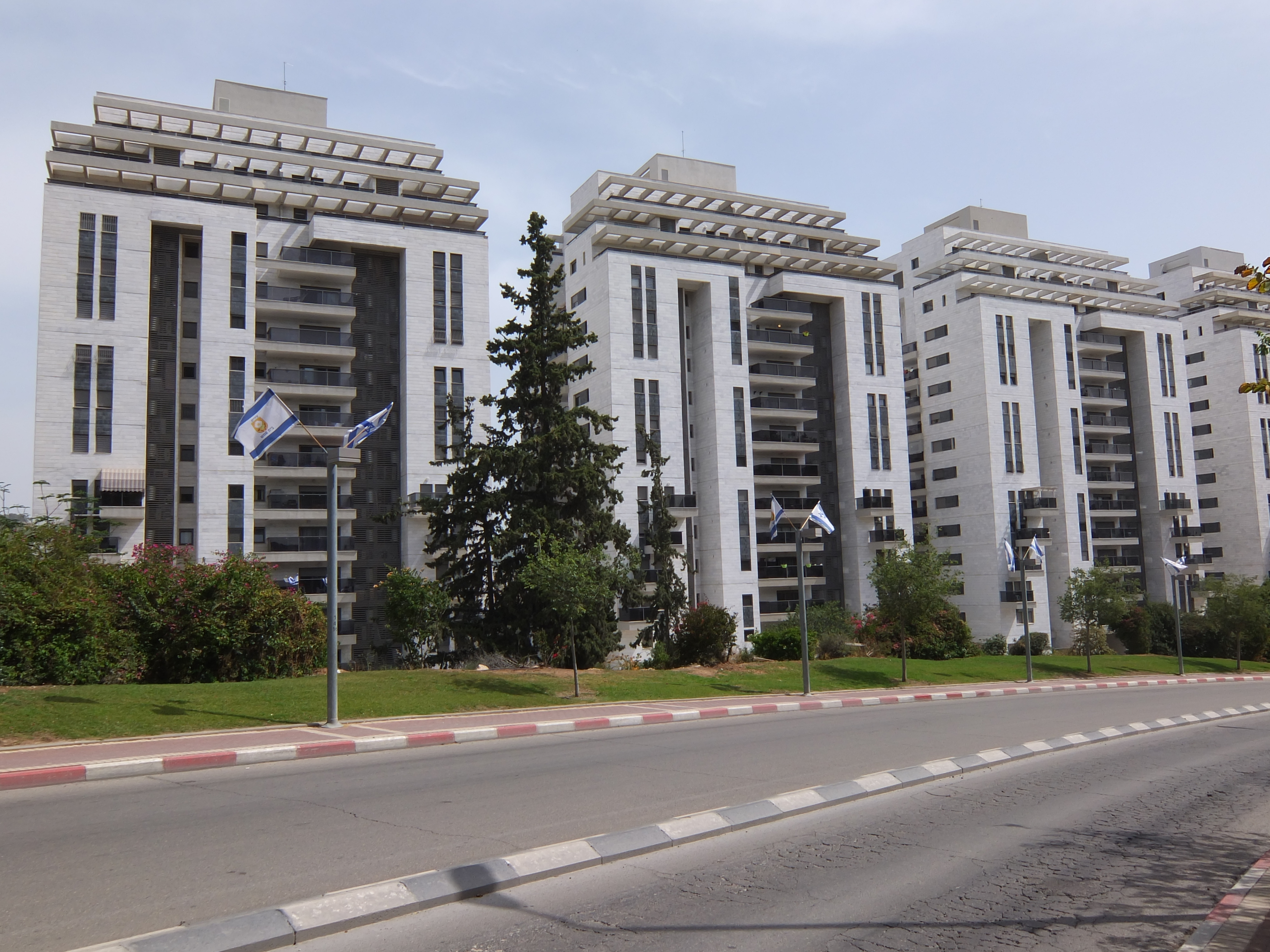
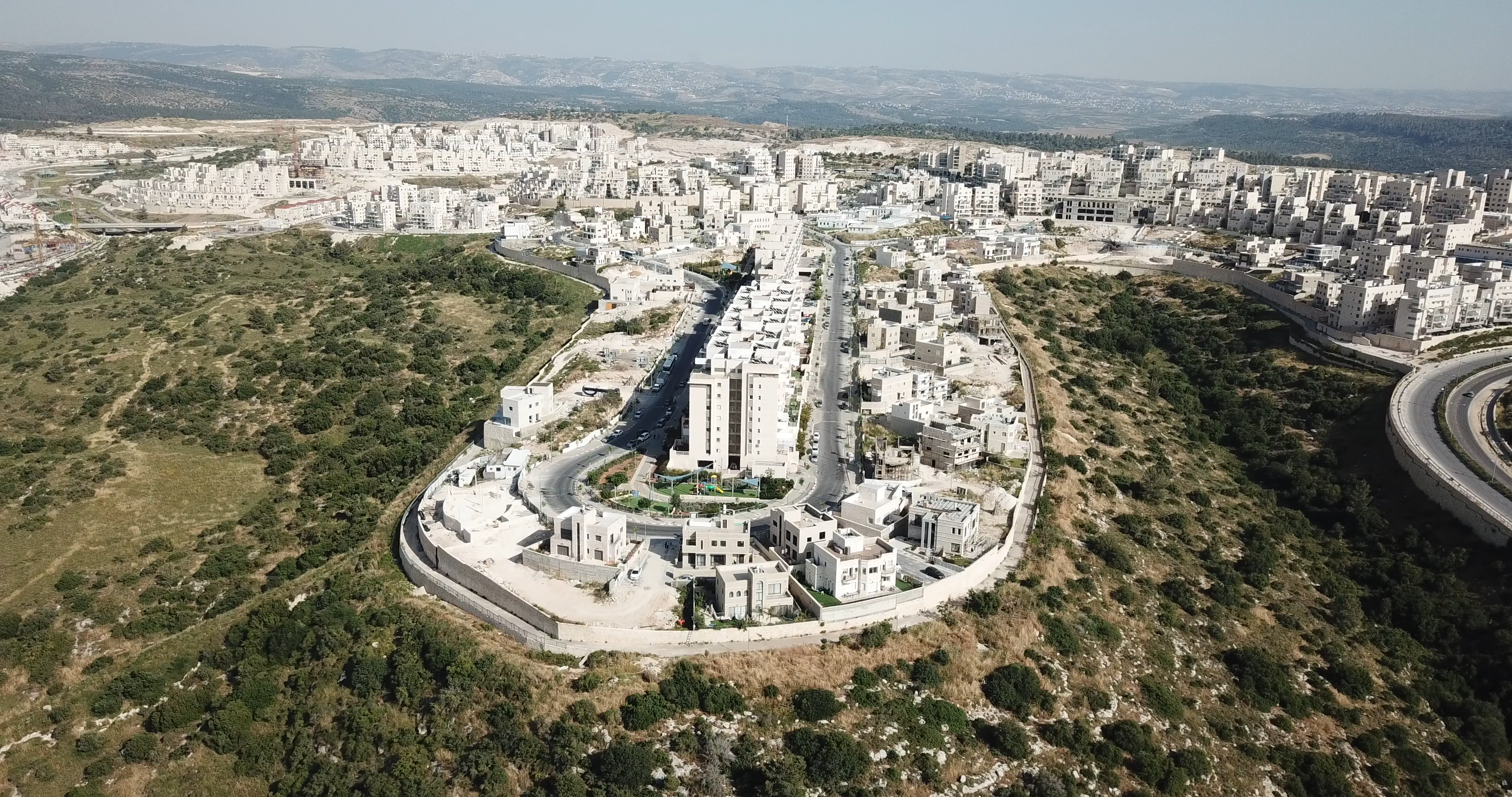

- Coat of arms
- Interactive map of Beit Shemesh
- Location within Jerusalem District Location within Israel
- Country: Israel
- District: Jerusalem
- Natural Region: Judean Foothills

Government
  - Mayor: Shmuel Greenberg (DHT)

Area
  - Total: 34,259 dunams (34.259 km^{2}; 13.227 sq mi)

Population (2024)
  - Total: 176,786
  - Density: 5,160.3/km^{2} (13,365/sq mi)

Ethnicity
  - Jews and others: 99.9%
  - Arabs: 0.1%
- Name meaning: House of the Sun

Beit Shemesh (Hebrew: בֵּית שֶׁמֶשׁ, lit. 'House of the Sun') is a city located approximately 30 kilometres (19 mi) west of Jerusalem in Israel's Jerusalem District. A center of Haredi Judaism and Modern Orthodoxy, Beit Shemesh had a population of 176,786 as of 2024.

The city is named after Beth Shemesh, a Biblical city of the territory of the Tribe of Judah, and located near Tel Beit Shemesh / Ain Shams, an archeological site with remains going back to a Bronze age Canaanite settlement.

== History ==
=== Tel Beit Shemesh ===
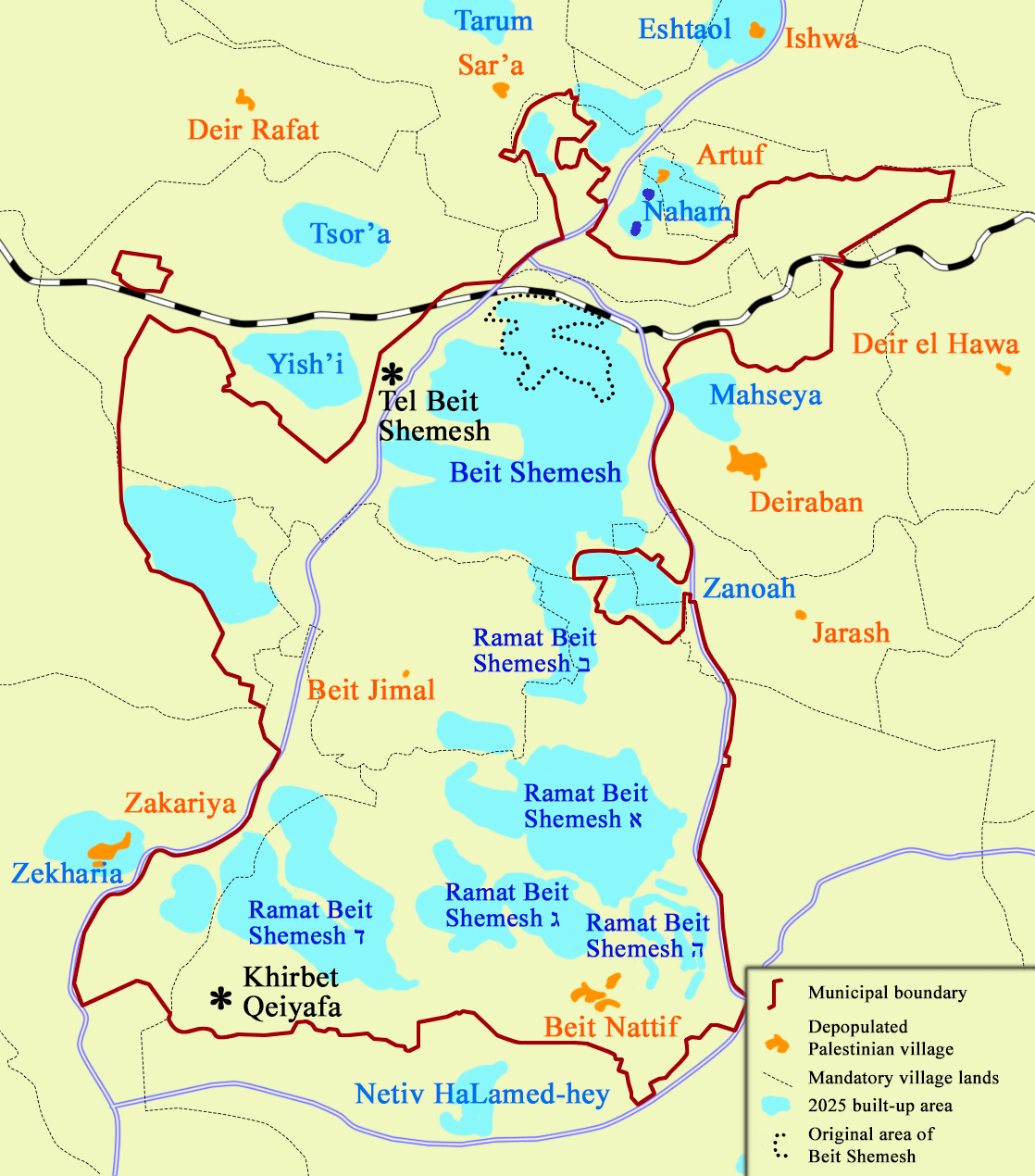
Beit Shemesh in historical context

The small archaeological tell northwest of the modern city was identified in the late 1830s as Biblical Beth Shemesh – it was known as Ain Shams – by Edward Robinson. The ruins on the mound have been attributed to an ancient Canaanite settlement that evolved into a fortified city of the Tribe of Judah. Excavations were carried out in various phases throughout much of the 20th century.

There are also other ancient ruins and findings within the boundaries of the modern municipality. In 2024, an Early Bronze Age structure was found in preparation of an industrial zone west wards of the city. In the location called Hurvat Husham pottery kilns, vessels and a public structure likely used as a cultic site were dated to the 3rd millennium BCE. In the area of the neighborhood called Ramat Beit Shemesh, a series of Hebrew-language ostraca were found, dating from the period of the First Temple, which shed light on the Kingdom of Judah in the 7th century BCE.

=== Early development town years ===
On 6 December 1950, the Hartuv displaced persons camp "Ma'abarat Har-Tuv" was established on the site of the current-day Moshav Naham. The first inhabitants were Jewish Bulgarian immigrants. They were joined by more Jewish immigrants from Bulgaria, Iran, Iraq, Romania, Morocco, and Kurdistan.

In 1952, the residents of the Ma'abarot began relocating into the first permanent houses that were constructed in Beit Shemesh. In its early years, Beit Shemesh came to typify the "development town" with a largely Maghrebi immigrant population. In 1977, following a writeup in Haaretz, Beit Shemesh was perceived as the main outpost for Menachem Begin's Likud party. He promised to rehabilitate neighborhoods and when the Likud party came to power that year, investment in the city increased.

Building of a new area of Beit Shemesh called "Givat Sharett" commenced on the hill adjacent to, and immediately to the south of, the original part of Beit Shemesh (the original area now being colloquially referred to as "Old Beit Shemesh" despite continuing building there and in the rest of the city).

=== 21st century ===
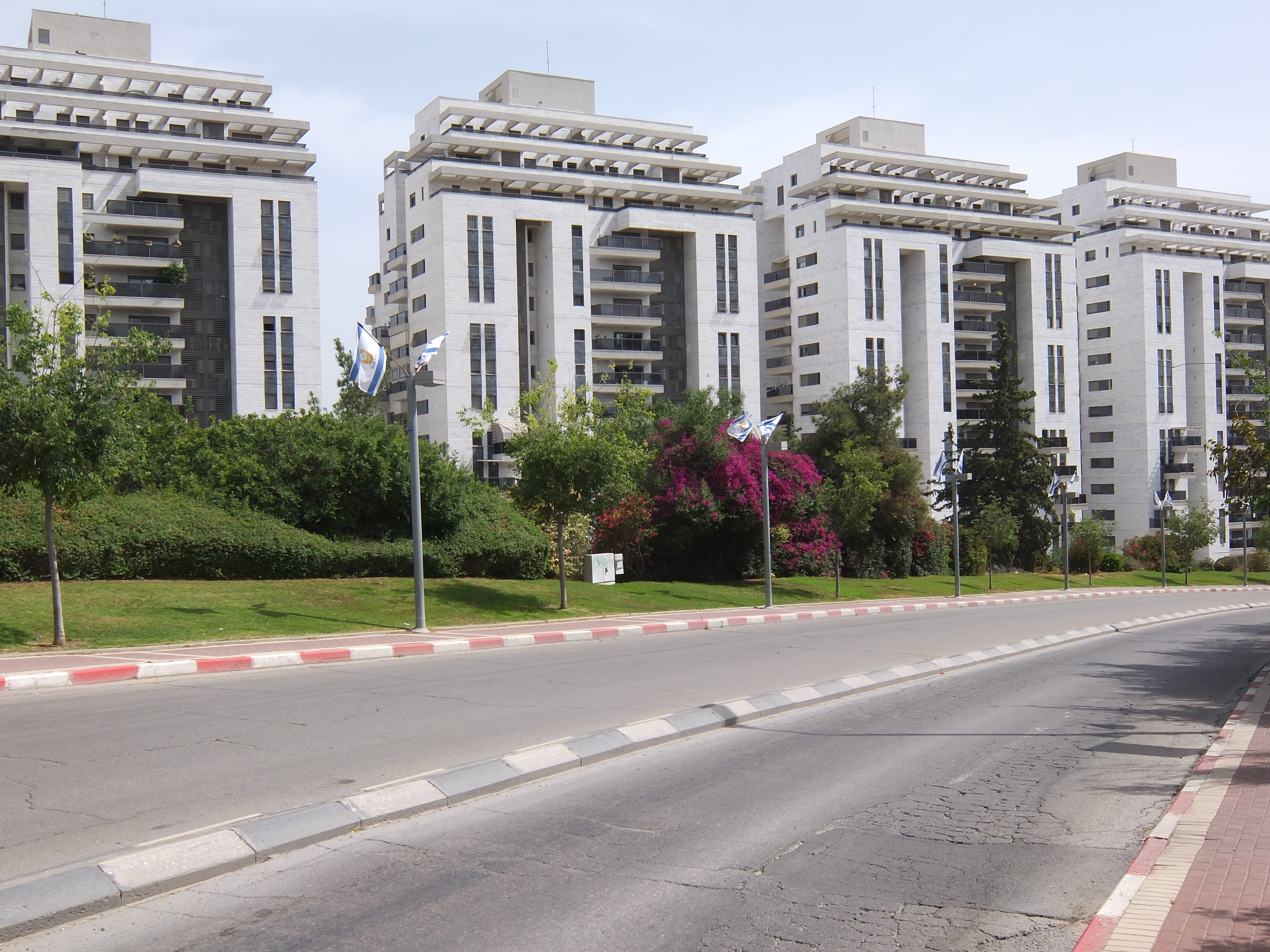
Apartment complexes in Beit Shemesh

The Israel Police maintains a bomb disposal specialist unit and training center in Beit Shemesh.

The Nahala U'Menucha neighborhood, the Sheinfeld neighborhood, the Nofei Aviv neighborhood and the Migdal HaMayim neighborhood all began to be built in the early 1990s in Givat Sharret. Ramat Beit Shemesh started to be built on hills immediately south of Givat Sharett in the late 1990s, doubling the size of the city. In 2017, the Israeli government approved a master plan to build 17,000 new housing units along with 53 hectares (130 acres) zoned as new commercial space for businesses and hotels. It was expected that the city could be home to as many as 250,000 residents by 2025 and 350,000 by 2035. A new commercial center in the Ramat Beit Shemesh neighborhood is planned to be the city's largest. In 2020, the construction of a hospital in Beit Shemesh, which will be run as a branch of Hadassah Medical Center, was approved.

Amid the 2026 Iran war, a missile attack on 1 March by Islamic Republic forces targeted a residential neighborhood, destroying a synagogue, a public bomb shelter, surrounding homes and many cars. The strike killed nine people, left 11 people missing, and injured at least 28 others, including children, two of whom were in serious condition. Amnesty International investigated evidence of the strike and issued a statement that condemned the use of a missile that is inherently inaccurate with no legitimate nearby military target as "a violation of international humanitarian law" for which the individuals involved should be prosecuted for war crimes.

== Climate ==
Beit Shemesh has a Mediterranean climate (Köppen: Csa), with mild, rainy winters and hot, nearly rainless summers.

Climate data for Beit Shemesh (Beit Jimal) (1991–2020)
Month	Jan	Feb	Mar	Apr	May	Jun	Jul	Aug	Sep	Oct	Nov	Dec	Year
Record high °C (°F)	29.2 (84.6)	32.2 (90.0)	37.0 (98.6)	40.6 (105.1)	42.3 (108.1)	43.1 (109.6)	40.5 (104.9)	40.9 (105.6)	42.3 (108.1)	41.2 (106.2)	34.5 (94.1)	32.1 (89.8)	43.1 (109.6)
Mean daily maximum °C (°F)	17.1 (62.8)	18.1 (64.6)	21.0 (69.8)	25.4 (77.7)	29.3 (84.7)	31.7 (89.1)	33.1 (91.6)	33.4 (92.1)	32.1 (89.8)	29.5 (85.1)	24.3 (75.7)	19.3 (66.7)	26.2 (79.2)
Daily mean °C (°F)	13.1 (55.6)	13.8 (56.8)	16.1 (61.0)	19.5 (67.1)	23.0 (73.4)	25.4 (77.7)	27.2 (81.0)	27.7 (81.9)	26.5 (79.7)	24.1 (75.4)	19.7 (67.5)	15.2 (59.4)	20.9 (69.6)
Mean daily minimum °C (°F)	9.1 (48.4)	9.4 (48.9)	11.1 (52.0)	13.7 (56.7)	16.7 (62.1)	19.1 (66.4)	21.2 (70.2)	21.7 (71.1)	20.8 (69.4)	18.7 (65.7)	15.0 (59.0)	11.1 (52.0)	15.6 (60.1)
Record low °C (°F)	0.0 (32.0)	0.2 (32.4)	2.0 (35.6)	3.4 (38.1)	9.5 (49.1)	13.0 (55.4)	17.4 (63.3)	18.6 (65.5)	13.9 (57.0)	11.9 (53.4)	6.7 (44.1)	0.6 (33.1)	0.0 (32.0)
Average precipitation mm (inches)	135.9 (5.35)	108.6 (4.28)	61.1 (2.41)	15.1 (0.59)	6.9 (0.27)	0.2 (0.01)	0.0 (0.0)	0.0 (0.0)	0.3 (0.01)	15.0 (0.59)	56.9 (2.24)	110.1 (4.33)	510.1 (20.08)
Average precipitation days (≥ 1.0 mm)	9.4	8.2	5.4	2.1	0.8	0.0	0.0	0.0	0.1	2.0	4.7	7.2	39.9
Source: NOAA

== Demographics ==
Historical population
Year	Pop.	±% p.a.
1955	3,000	—
1961	6,986	+15.13%
1972	10,111	+3.42%
1983	12,956	+2.28%
1995	24,179	+5.34%
2000	44,200	+12.82%
2005	65,900	+8.32%
2015	103,900	+4.66%
2019	124,957	+4.72%
2024	170,683	+6.44%
2025	181,986	+6.62%
2026	193,479	+6.32%
Source: CBS

When the city was built in the 1950s, it was initially settled by new immigrants from Iran, Iraq, Romania, Bulgaria, Morocco, and Iraqi Kurdistan. In the 1990s, the city saw a large influx of new immigrants from the former Soviet Union, Ethiopia, and English-speaking countries, turning it into a major center for immigrants from English-speaking countries (Anglo-Saxon). Considerable numbers have come from North America, the United Kingdom, South Africa, and Australia. This population tends to be Orthodox, educated, and from middle-income groups. At the same time, Orthodox Jews from within Israel also began moving to the city, seeking roomier, low-cost housing.

According to a city councilor, there were no "ultra-Orthodox" a.k.a. Haredim groups in Beit Shemesh before the 1990s. Since then, Beit Shemesh has become increasingly religious, with a large Haredi sector, particularly in Ramat Beit Shemesh. Many synagogues and yeshivas have been built in the city. Religious communities represented in Beit Shemesh include Chabad Ger, Belz, American Modern Orthodox and American Yeshivish, French Sefardim, South African Modern Orthodox, Israeli Dati Leumi and more recently a Spanish speaking community. In 2011 Haredim made up 40% of the population. According to statistics published by the municipality, 63% of the city's schoolchildren in 2010 were Haredim. 75% of the children entering the first grade in the 2012/2013 academic year were registered in official Haredi institutions.

=== Ramat Beit Shemesh ===
Map of Ramat Beit Shemesh subdistricts

Ramat Beit Shemesh is an expansion that lies directly adjacent to, and to the south of, the neighborhood of Givat Sharett in Beit Shemesh, which itself was an earlier extension of Beit Shemesh built on a hill immediately to the south of "Old Beit Shemesh". Ramat Beit Shemesh is located on a hill overlooking Givat Sharett. Ramat Beit Shemesh has a large, diverse Orthodox population. Originally, it consisted of two areas: Ramat Beit Shemesh Alef and Ramat Beit Shemesh Bet. In Ramat Beit Shemesh Bet, families belonging to Eda Haredit constitute the majority. In 2002, following tensions between the Haredi and non-religious population, plans were drawn up to build another secular neighborhood, HaShachar. In 2007, Ramat Shilo, considered a subdistrict of Ramat Beit Shemesh, with both Dati Leumi and Haredi residents was built. In 2009, it was announced that a new neighborhood, Ramat Beit Shemesh Gimmel, would be built as a largely Haredi neighborhood on a large block of state-owned land bordering southern Beit Shemesh. In 2016 the Israeli Land Authority published tenders for 3,268 new apartments, to be built in the newly proposed areas of Ramat Beit Shemesh Dalet and Hey. According to plans, ultimately there are to be 8,300 new apartments in RBS Dalet alone.

==== Ramat Beit Shemesh Alef ====
Ramat Beit Shemesh Aleph (Hebrew: רמת בית שמש א) is a neighborhood of Beit Shemesh comprising about 25,000 people. The neighborhood has numerous parks and public areas. The newest park is Yarmut Park, the biggest in Beit Shemesh. There are supermarkets and a shopping area with over 130 shops. The area has a few different sections, including Dolev section, the Revivim section, and the Mishkenos Yaakov section.

The Dolev section contains a heterogeneous mix of native Israelis and immigrants. Religiosity varies as well from Hareidi until Masorti or Dati Leumi, with each group having its own synagogues and schools, in general. Masos/Masot Mordechai is a place where all types come together to pray at all times of the day. Points of interest in the Dolev section are the Matnas community center and Park Center, a mini-mall of various stores and restaurants. Streets include Dolev, Lachish, Shimshon, Timnah, Yarkon, and Yarden.

The Revivim section is lower down than Dolev. This area is populated mostly by Haredim, both Israeli and of Anglo descent, with varying religious levels. The majority of residents are Olim (immigrants to Israel), in this case primarily from the US. Streets include Revivim, Ramot, Gilo, Noam, and Achziv.

The Mishkenos Yaakov section is located next to the Merkaz (central business district). Here the population is almost exclusively Haredim, both Israelis and Chutznikim, although the Chuznikim tend to lean towards their Israeli counterparts regarding religious/cultural issues. There is an official Rav (Mara D'Asra), Rav Mordechai Goldstein. Points of interest in the Mishkenos Yaakov area include Lev Eliyahu, the synagogue with the most Minyanim in all of RBSA, and the Merkaz, the shopping center more than 130 stores of all types. Streets include Sorek (lower half), Kishon, Uriah, Micha, and Shacham.

A further expansion to Ramat Beit Shemesh is the community of Mishkafayim, located at the eastern edge of Aleph overlooking the Zanoah quarry. The residents are Orthodox Jews of all strands including Chasidish, Hareidi, and Dati Leumi/Modern Orthodox.

Organizations based in Ramat Beit Shemesh Aleph include:

- Hatzola Beit Shemesh – An independent organization combining first response and follow-up care of emergency medical situations.
- Kupa Shel Tzedaka – A charity organization helping needy families to rehabilitate them to self-sufficiency. (Mishkenos Yaakov has a separate organization for their needy families.)
- Ezrat Achim – A medical aid organization such as trips to the hospital, x-rays, and loan of medical equipment.
- Mishkan Adei Ad – An organization that assists needy families with the vast expenses of making weddings.
- Hakeshiva – An organization that focuses on the prevention of, and giving aiding to, teens-at-risk.

==== Ramat Beit Shemesh Bet ====
Ramat Beit Shemesh Bet (Hebrew: רמת בית שמש ב), situated between Beit Shemesh and Ramat Beit Shemesh Aleph, is primarily populated by Haredi Jews, of which most are Hasidic Jews of various dynasties.

==== Ramat Beit Shemesh Gimmel ====
Ramat Beit Shemesh Gimmel (Hebrew: רמת בית שמש ג) is located just south of Ramat Beit Shemesh Aleph, overlooking the Nachal Yarmut Park. RBS Gimmel consists of two parts, Gimmel Aleph (1) officially named "Kiryat Avi Ezri", and Gimmel Bet or Gimmel Shtayim (2), officially named "Kiryat Ovadia".

Gimmel 1 which is heavily populated with over 3,000 apartments, developed into a thriving neighborhood in a very short time, and as of 2024 has many synagogues, stores, clinics, and schools.

Gimmel 2 is closer to the original Ramat Beit Shemesh Aleph. Neve Shamir is to its east, and to its west, is Gimmel 1. Residents first started moving into Gimmel 2 in 2020 and the neighborhood has 3 shopping centers and multiple synagogues.

Both Gimmel 1 & 2 have become very appealing to the Anglo-Saxon public, though there seems to be a higher percentage of English speakers in Gimmel 1.

==== Ramat Beit Shemesh Daled ====
As of 2024, Ramat Beit Shemesh Daled (Hebrew: רמת בית שמש ד) has become a sprawling multi sectional neighborhood. Currently there are 4 sections: RBS Daled 1,2,3 & 4. While there is still a lot of construction, many buildings have been built and populated, predominately by Haredi Jews.

The plan was that a total of 8,000 homes and apartments would be built in three stages; Daled 1, Daled 2 and Daled 3. The neighborhoods of Daled 1 and Daled 2 would each comprise 3,000 apartments, and Daled 4 would have 2,000 apartments.

==== Ramat Beit Shemesh Hey / Neve Shamir ====
The neighborhood, under construction, was originally earmarked for the non-Haredi public and it was designed like non-Haredi neighborhood. However, being that some of the apartments were marketed as part of "mechir la-mishtaken" program and the tenders were won by many Haredi and Religious Zionist families, this area also seems to be turning into a religious neighborhood. The rest is being sold in the private market, with many Haredim already have purchased houses. According to the former mayor, Aliza Bloch, "We are witnessing a group of purchasers of residents of Beit Shemesh being divided among the general public, another group outside the city, such as: Gush Etzion, Mevaseret Zion and Jerusalem, and a group of people from abroad, mainly from the US, a community-oriented population such as the Sheinfeld neighborhood. Just a year ago, I toured the US and met with many groups whose fruits are for the encounters that I see there today. In addition, we try to interest the teachers' union, such as the Ashmoreth group, where teachers and education people, the Neve Shamir neighborhood is of interest to them." In May 2020, Dozens married couples that are secular (ḥiloni) and national religious (dathi leumi) took part in a tour of the Neve Shamir neighborhood with former Mayor Aliza Bloch and her deputy. Those in attendance answered current questions and information from the field. In light of the success of the reunion, more tours were held.

==== Ramat Shilo ====
Ramat Shilo was built in 2007 with 340 housing units geared toward Modern Orthodox Jews. Since then, the neighborhood has experienced rapid growth and development. The residents of Ramat Shilo are Orthodox Jews, both Dati Leumi and Haredi. The neighborhood has a large community of English-speaking olim. Its residents are both Ashkenazim and Sephardim.

Ramat Shilo has a number of synagogues, yeshivas and kollels. The largest institution is Yeshivat Lev Hatorah, a Religious Zionist yeshiva founded by Rabbi Boaz Mori. The local synagogues include Beis Dovid/Pilzno Beis HaMedrash, a Hasidic synagogue representing the Pilzno Hasidic dynasty under the leadership of Rabbi Yehoshua Gerzi, Mishkan Shilo, an Ashkenazi synagogue under the leadership of Rabbi Dovid Bagno, Mishkan Moshe Va'Eliyahu, a Sephardi synagogue under the leadership of Rabbi Shai Naftali, and Ohev Yisroel, a Hasidic synagogue under the leadership of Rabbi Binyomin Flintenstein of the Kapishnitzer Hassidic dynasty.

Notable residents of Ramat Shilo include:

- Rabbi Avraham Jacobovitz, founder of Machon L'Torah and Jewish Awareness America (JAAM)
- Rabbi Howard Apfel, cardiologist at Columbia University Medical Center.
- Rabbi Yehoshua Fass, founder and executive director of Nefesh B'Nefesh

Among the communal organizations is Chasdei Shilo which provides assistance for families with financial difficulties as well as serves as a communal resource network.

=== Urban kibbutz Tamuz ===
Beit Shemesh also has an urban kibbutz affiliated with the Kibbutz Movement, Tamuz, founded in 1987.

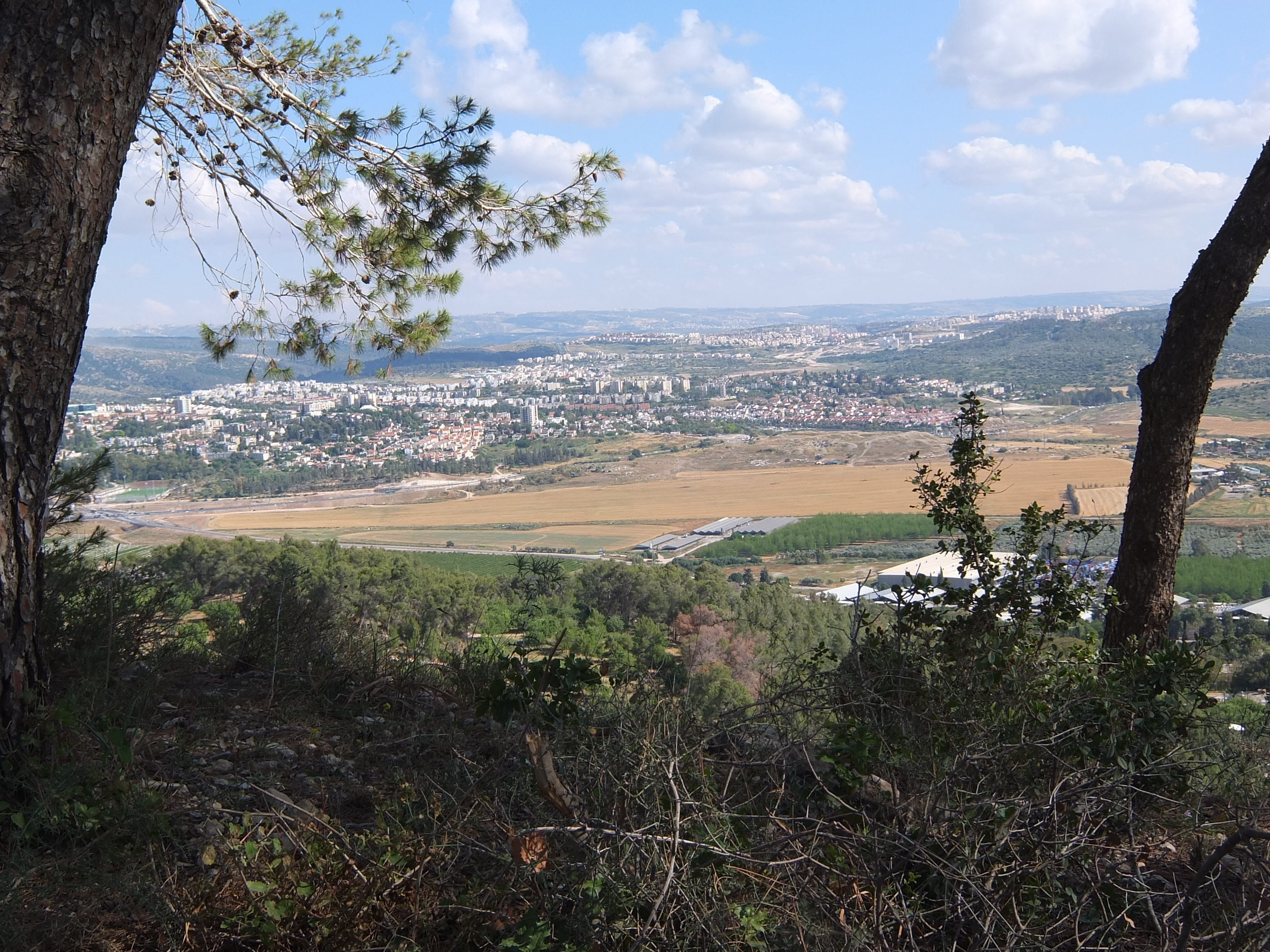
Beit Shemesh as seen from Tzora (Zorah) mountain

== Local government ==
The mayor of Beit Shemesh is Shmuel Greenberg of Degel HaTorah, who assumed office in March 2024 after a second round of elections, defeating incumbent mayor Aliza Bloch in a second round of voting with 60% of the vote, behind the support of the city's Haredi community.

Bloch had taken office in November 2018 after defeating two-term incumbent Moshe Abutbul of Shas.

Beit Shemesh had long been a bastion of support for Likud. By the 2006 Knesset elections, United Torah Judaism became the city's strongest party, with 22.2 percent of the votes and Shas getting 19.9 percent. In 2009 Likud regained its primacy, obtaining 22.2 percent of the votes, and Shas also gained, garnering 20.9 percent, with United Torah Judaism a close third at 20.6 percent and Eda Haredit boycotting the elections. In the 2022 Knesset elections, Likud garnered 15% of the vote, with Shas and United Torah Judaism collecting the majority of votes.

During the municipal elections held on 22 October 2013, acting on several anonymous tips, police raided several private residences and recovered 200 ID cards and disguising materials such as hats, glasses and wigs which law enforcement suspected were used or going to be used for fraudulent voting. Additionally, eight people were arrested on suspicion for engaging and coordinating fraudulent voting activities.

On 10 December 2013, a three-judge panel of the Jerusalem District Court nullified the results of the October municipal elections due to voter fraud and ordered a new election.

Following an unprecedented 76% voter turnout rate, incumbent mayor Moshe Abutbul beat contender Eli Cohen with a 51% majority vote during the reelection which took place on 11 March 2014.

=== Heads of local council ===
- Shmuel Aviezer (1953–1955)
- Menahem Noyman (1955–1965)
- Oved Seri Levy (1965–1967)
- Amram Lok (1967–1978)
- Yehuda Ben-Zeev (1978–1989)

=== Mayors ===
- Shalom Fadida (1989–1993)
- Daniel Vaknin (1993–2008)
- Moshe Abutbul (2008–2018)
- Aliza Bloch (2018–2024)
- Shmuel Greenberg (2024–present)

== Voting Patterns ==
In the 2022 election, 91 percent of voters in Beit Shemesh voted for the parties of the right-wing coalition led by Benjamin Netanyahu, while 7 percent voted for the parties of the center-left coalition led by Yair Lapid and 0.05 percent voted for the Arab parties. 60 percent of voters voted for the Haredi parties Shas or UTJ.

In the 2026 election, 87 percent of voters in Beit Shemesh voted for the parties of the right-wing coalition led by Benjamin Netanyahu, while 6 percent voted for the parties of the center-left coalition led by Gadi Eisenkot and 0.06 percent voted for the Arab parties. An additional 1.3 percent voted for the Reservists, and 1.2 percent voted for Amcha Yisrael. Voter turnout increased 28 percent from the 2022 election.

== Education ==
In 2001, there were 56 schools and 14,148 students in the city: 41 elementary schools with 10,716 elementary school students, and 20 high schools with 3,432 high school students. 40.3% of 12th grade students were entitled to a matriculation certificate.

== Economy ==
Beit Shemesh has two industrial zones containing mainly small industry, particularly in the Northern industrial zone which is typified by carpentry and metalwork workshops, garages and wholesale and retail outlets. The Western industrial zone contains several larger companies including Beit Shemesh Engines Ltd. (BSEL) which manufactures and repairs jet engines and jet engine components, Barzellan and others. Nearby in the Noham industrial zone are situated various other factories and offices. Since the high tech boom began in the 1990s, Beit Shemesh has been host to several hi-tech startups including Omek Interactive.

== Transportation ==
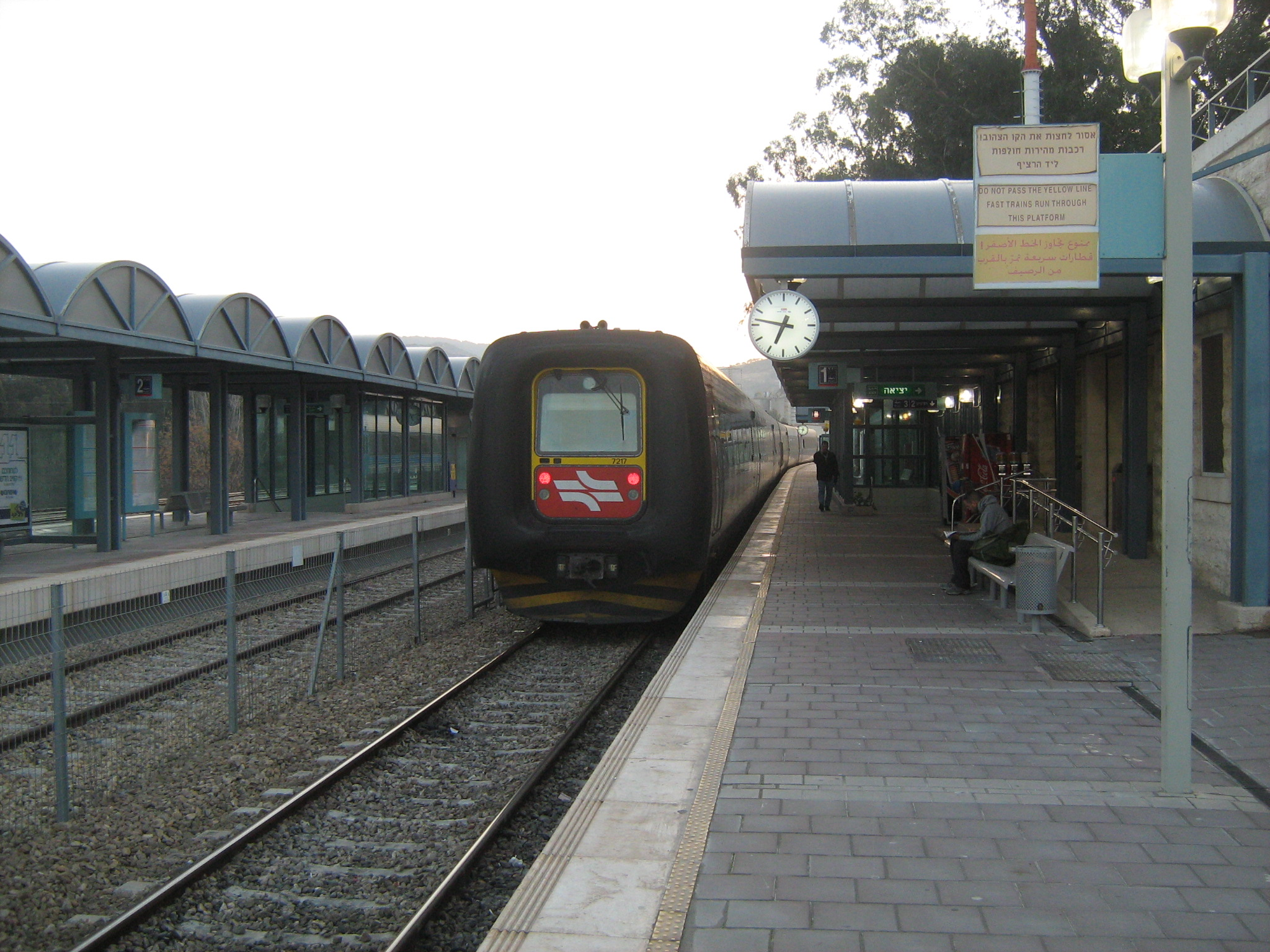
Beit Shemesh Railway Station

Bus transportation within Beit Shemesh and most inter-city routes is operated by Tnufah and Beit Shemesh Express as of 2021, replacing the former Superbus, which began service on 5 January 2009. The Egged Bus Cooperative, which previously operated all bus service in and to Beit Shemesh, still operates to some distant cities but no longer operates from Beit Shemesh to Jerusalem. Nateev express operates busses to Tsfat and Netivot.

Tnufa operates the inter-city bus routes as of 2021. The travel time between Beit Shemesh and Jerusalem by bus is between 40 minutes and 1 hour. Transportation to Tel aviv is between an hour and an hour and fifteen minutes.

The new express lines to Jerusalem are direct with new addition such as bus line 600 and the night lines.

Beit Shemesh Express operates over 40 bus routes with over 200 electric buses serving all areas of the city as of 2021.

Originally opened in 1892, the Beit Shemesh railway station provides hourly service on the Israel Railways Herzliya–Lod–Jerusalem line. The station is located in the north industrial zone of Beit Shemesh at the Big Fashion Mall and shopping center across from Shaarei Hair Mall.

It was renovated and reopened on 13 September 2003, having existed for over a century at the same location. The station has three platforms.

== Sports ==
Beit Shemesh is home to numerous sports clubs all under the main sport associations (Beitar, Hapoel, and Maccabi). The city has soccer teams including juniors, seniors and over-35s teams and boasted a franchise in the Israel Baseball League. The Beit Shemesh Blue Sox represented Beit Shemesh and finished in first place nationally in the league's only season, though they played their games at Gezer Field in Kibbutz Gezer due to a lack of proper facilities in Beit Shemesh. There is also a very active Little League in Beit Shemesh and Ramat Beit Shemesh, with over 300 members. In the field of judo, Elitzur Beit Shemesh has won many prizes. Israel Kung Fu and world Nunchaku champion (2001) Eli Ivgi was born in and lives in Beit Shemesh.

== Arab–Israeli conflict ==
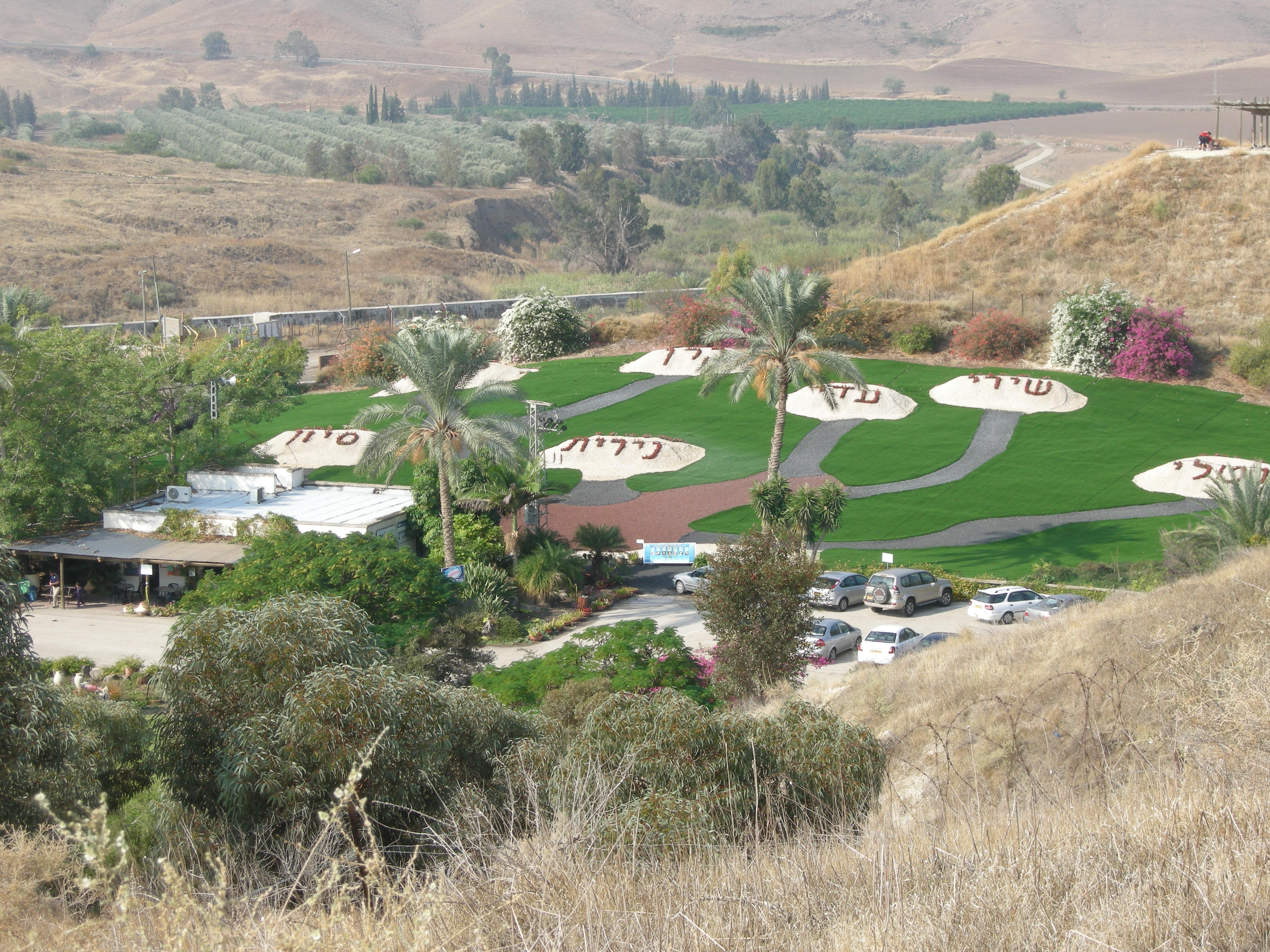
Memorial at Naharayim

Beit Shemesh has not been involved in any Arab conflict since 1997. On 13 March 1997, seven 13 and 14-year-old girls from Beit Shemesh's AMIT Fuerst School were killed at the "Island of Peace" site in Naharayim in Northern Israel by a Jordanian soldier while on a school class trip. They were visiting the joint Israeli and Jordanian tourist resort under Jordanian rule. King Hussein of Jordan went to Beit Shemesh a few days after the massacre to ask forgiveness in the name of his country.

== Transportation ==
Beit Shemesh will be getting an upgrade to its transportation infrastructure as part of the "Accelerator" project, which was approved in November 2024 at a cost of 1 billion shekels. As part of the project, bus lanes will be built, new bike paths will be paved, smart traffic lights and roundabouts will be built, and street signs and municipal signs will be upgraded. In addition, new, advanced bus stops will be built with real-time information displays and full accessibility. Work is expected to start on the project in March 2025.

The Tnufa Bus company which started service in 2022 and Express are the transportation carriers in Beit Shemesh. Previously Superbus and Egged also provided bus service.

== Communal tensions ==
As of 2024, Beit Shemesh is a thriving city with a mainly Haredi population, as well as a Dati Leumi minority. The growing pains of communal tensions of two decades ago have faded since the efforts of the last two mayors: Moshe Abutbul who now is a Knesset member and Aliza Bloch, the former mayor. Beit Shemesh is considered a religious, family-oriented city where children can walk safely and freely both day and night in all parts of the city under the current leadership of Shmuel Greenberg.

In 2004 the Israel Association of Ethiopian Jews claimed that Ethiopian Jews working for the municipality were being paid below-minimum wages. In 2011, the Association criticized the referral of Ethiopian Jews to three private pre-schools run by the mayor's wife.

According to The Jerusalem Post, women who belong to a Haredi burqa sect in Beit Shemesh were ostracized by the Haredi community. The leader of the movement, dubbed the "Taliban mother" by the Israeli press, was convicted by the Jerusalem District Court in 2009 on three counts of abuse of a minor and 25 counts of assault in aggravated circumstances, and sentenced to four years in prison. Her husband was also convicted of 10 counts of assault and three counts of abuse of a minor or helpless person, and was sentenced to six months in jail.

In 2011, conflicts erupted in Beit Shemesh between extremist anti-religious activists and devout Haredi men, possibly members of a group known as the Sikrikim, and other residents of the town due to opposition to maintaining gender separation at local health clinics, and so called ‘mehadrin buses’ where men and women sit separately.

When the municipality removed a sign asking women to respect gender separation rules in a synagogue, hundreds of devout Haredim staged protests in which physical force was allegedly used against police officers and reporters. Several placards urging segregation between men and women were put back after being removed by the police.

After the opening of the Orot Banot national-religious girls' school in September 2011, situated on the border between the primarily National-Religious Sheinfeld neighborhood and the Haredi Ramat Beit Shemesh Bet, groups of devout Haredim gathered to protest in front of the school, in protest at the lack of modest dress, allegedly calling the girls names and spitting at them when they headed to and from school. Stones hurled at a boys' school belonging to the same educational network injured a boy in the leg. Two men were arrested on suspicion of throwing eggs and tomatoes at students. In a demonstration outside the school a female journalist was assaulted by young, allegedly Haredi, men who cursed and spat at her, and a clash with parents of girls studying at the school was broken up by the police force.

In December 2011, a national public outcry was raised when a television news channel interviewed 8-year-old Na'ama Margolese, who was allegedly cursed and spat at on her way to school by devout Haredim. The Jewish Daily Forward reported that the issue is really a property dispute over ownership of the school building. Some Haredi women distributed flowers to the girls of Orot Banot school, telling them "sister to sister" that they were beautiful. On 27 December 2011, a protest against extremism near the Orot Banot school drew 10,000 people. After the incidents in Beit Shemesh were reported in foreign press, the US State Department updated its Jerusalem travel advisory advising visitors to "dress appropriately" when visiting ultra-Orthodox Jewish neighborhoods, or to avoid them entirely.

== Twin towns – sister cities ==
Beit Shemesh is twinned with:

- Cocoa, Florida, United States
- Hangzhou, China
- Nordhausen, Germany
- Nottingham, England, United Kingdom
- Ramapo, New York, United States
- Split, Croatia
- Jersey City, New Jersey, United States

In the Partnership 2gether program of the Jewish Agency for Israel, Beit Shemesh and the Mateh Yehuda Regional Council are linked to South Africa and Washington, D.C.

After The Washington Post reported in October 2011 that Montgomery County, Maryland was considering a partnership with Beit Shemesh, a local coalition, Human Rights Matter!, objected. The campaign was supported by the Mossawa Center, an organization that defines its goal as the promotion of equality for the Arab minority in Israel but which has been criticized for its rejection of Israel as a Jewish state and its foreign funding from the European Commission, George Soros's Open Society Institute and the New Israel Fund, among others, as well as Nobel Peace Prize laureate Mairead Maguire.

== Notable people ==
- Nissim Black (born 1986), American-Israeli rapper and producer
- Nili Block (born 1995), world champion kickboxer and Muay Thai fighter
- Chuck Davidson (born 1961), Orthodox rabbi who has challenged the Chief Rabbinate of Israel, specifically in the realms of marriage and conversion
- Jamie Geller (born 1978), American-born food writer, celebrity chef, television producer and businesswoman
- Ari Goldwag (born 1979), singer, songwriter, composer, and music producer
- Gael Grunewald (born 1964), World Zionist Organization executive
- Hezekiah (born 739 BCE), King of Judah
- Avraham Jacobovitz, founder of Machon L'Torah and Jewish Awareness America (JAAM)
- Yosef Karduner (born 1969), singer, songwriter, and composer.
- Shmuel Kozokin (born 1987), footballer
- Dov Lipman (born 1971), former politician who served as a member of the Knesset for Yesh Atid between 2013 and 2015
- Nachman Seltzer (born 1978), author and musician
- Natan Slifkin (born 1975), "Zoo Rabbi", director of the Biblical Museum of Natural History and author on the topics of zoology and science
- Eli Stefansky (born 1972), daf yomi maggid shiur
- Omer Yankelevich (born 1978), attorney, educator, social activist and politician who was the Minister of Diaspora Affairs and a member of the Knesset from 2019 to 2021

== Incidents ==
In May 2026, a large explosion accompanied by a fireball was reported in Beit Shemesh, near Jerusalem. Videos showed a bright flash and shockwave, with reports of shaking windows in surrounding areas. The state-owned defense company Tomer stated that the blast was a pre-planned, controlled test at a rocket engine testing facility, with authorities reportedly informed in advance. Israeli broadcaster Kan also described the incident as a controlled explosion.
