= Yeshivat Lev Hatorah =

Post-high-school Yeshiva in Ramat Bet Shemesh, Israel

Yeshivat Lev HaTorah
- Rechov Nachal Ein Gedi #37; Ramat Bet Shemesh 99000; Israel

Information
- Type: Post-high-school
- Established: 2002
- Staff: 23
- Enrollment: 80
- Affiliation: Modern Orthodox Judaism/Religious Zionist
- Rosh Yeshiva: Rav Boaz Mori
- Website: www.levhatorah.org

Yeshivat Lev HaTorah (Hebrew: ישיבת ההסדר לב התורה) is a Religious Zionist yeshiva, located in Ramat Shilo, a sub-district of Ramat Bet Shemesh, Israel.

== Notable alumni ==
- Adam Edelman (born 1991), American-born four-time Israeli National Champion in skeleton event, and Israeli Olympian
