= Aliza Bloch =

Israeli educator and politician

- עליזה בלוך
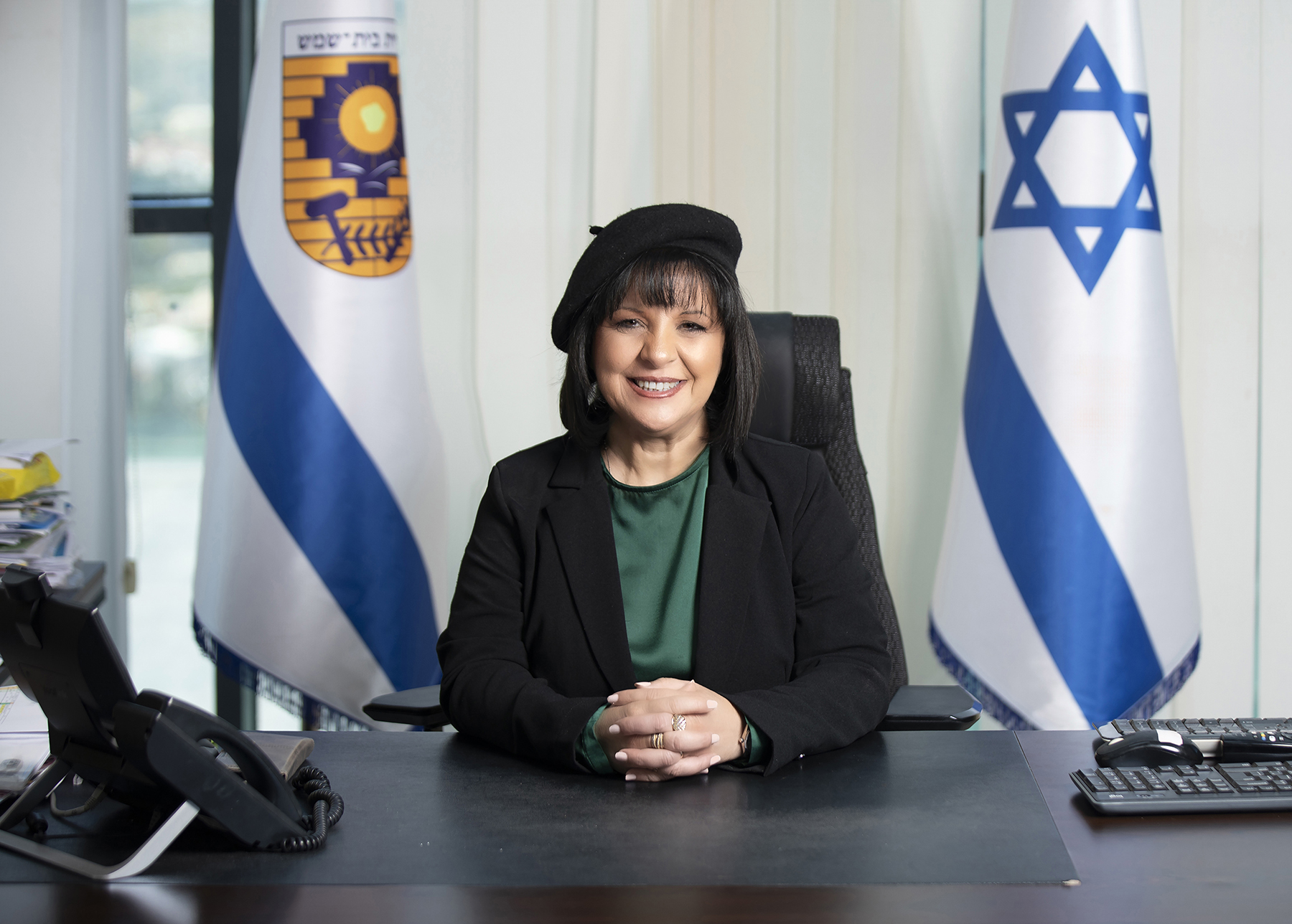
- Aliza Bloch in 2023

Mayor of Beit Shemesh
- In office 20 November 2018 – 31 March 2024
- Preceded by: Moshe Abutbul
- Succeeded by: Shmuel Greenberg

Personal details
- Born: Geula Aliza Ben-Hamo; 13 October 1967 (age 58) Kiryat Gat, Israel
- Party: Blue and White (since September 2026)
- Other political affiliations: The Jewish Home (2013–2023); Unity (2026)
- Spouse: Aharon Bloch
- Children: 4
- Education: Bar Ilan
- Occupation: Teacher • Politician

Geulah Aliza Bloch (Hebrew: גאולה עליזה בלוך; born 13 October 1967) is an Israeli teacher and politician. In 2018, she became the first female mayor of Beit Shemesh, and in 2019 she was named by The Jerusalem Post as one of the world's 50 most influential Jews.

== Biography ==
The daughter of Jewish immigrants from Morocco, Bloch was born in Israel and grew up in Kiryat Gat. She has an undergraduate degree in mathematics as well as a doctorate in education from Bar Ilan University. She was the vice-principal of the Givat Gonen school in the Katamon neighborhood of Jerusalem. She moved to Beit Shemesh with her husband Aharon in 1992 and served as principal of the Branco-Weiss High School there.

In 2011, she was awarded the Rothschild Prize in Education.

== Political career ==
Bloch was selected as a candidate for mayor of Beit Shemesh in 2013 for the Bayit Yehudi party. However two and a half months before the election, the party, then under Naftali Bennett, switched their support and supported independent candidate Eli Cohen instead. Five years later, in 2018, she defeated 10-year incumbent mayor Moshe Abutbul by 533 votes. Bloch was widely seen as a dark horse candidate and campaigned on a platform of providing better services and infrastructure in Beit Shemesh. Bloch, a Religious Zionist candidate, pledged to unite and accommodate the city's Haredi, secular, and American oleh populations. Bloch was endorsed by a wide spectrum of Israeli political parties, including Jewish Home, Likud, Labor, Kulanu, and Yesh Atid.

During the summer of 2019, Bloch sustained harsh criticism from the Haredi sector over a spate of demolitions of illegally-built synagogues, with workers removing the spray-painted (in Hebrew) slogan "Aliza Bloch = Hitler" from a wall. Other graffiti labeled her a terrorist. On 1 August, a Beit Shemesh synagogue built on Israel Lands Authority property was demolished by the government, with residents blaming the municipality for not interceding enough on their behalf. A few days later, Haredim protested the mistreatment of many families who claimed they were ignored in their basic education and religious needs. In 2021, Bloch fired seven council members (from Haredi parties Degel HaTorah, Agudat Yisrael and from the Likud) for allegedly preventing the development of the city. Later, they solved their disagreement.

She worked to build the first sportech at the city. In addition, she worked towards building areas such as S-Park, which will be a project in the planned employment, office and commercial park. The hackathon initiative (a competitive event aimed at producing innovative solutions to a given problem under time pressure) was promoted, which aims to improve the involvement of the city's residents in community life and to unite the various sectors.

Aliza lost the second round of the 2024 municipal election to Ultraorthodox candidate Shmuel Greenberg.

On 10 August 2026, Bloch announced she was joining Gilad Erdan and Yuli Edelstein's unnamed party ahead of the 2026 Israeli legislative election. The name of the party, Unity, was revealed the following day. Bloch stated in an interview with The Jerusalem Post later that month that she would focus on education. Unity withdrew from the election on 4 September.

Bloch joined Blue and White several days later.

== Personal life ==
Bloch is married to Aharon Bloch and has four children.

== See also ==
- Women in Israel
