= Avraham Jacobovitz =

Israeli-born Charedi rabbi

Rabbi Avraham Jacobovitz (Hebrew: אברהם יעקובוביץ; born 1952) is an Israeli-born Charedi (ultra-orthodox) rabbi, who founded Machon L'Torah and Jewish Awareness America (JAAM), to educate Jewish college students about Jewish heritage and values.

== Early life ==
Born in 1952 in Tel Aviv to Rabbi Yehuda Jacobovitz and Sheina Dvora, Jacobovitz studied in the Slabodka yeshiva of Bnei Brak.

When he was seventeen his family moved to Brooklyn, where his father lectured in the Mirrer Yeshiva.

A few years later he married Bayla.

After spending a few years in the Mirrer kollel, he and his wife moved to Detroit, where he studied in the Kollel Institute of Greater Detroit.

== Career of Kiruv ==
Starting with lectures in the Kollel's basement, in the summer of 1980 he founded Machon L'Torah, the Jewish Learning Network of Michigan.

In the summer of 1988, Machon purchased its own building in Oak Park, Michigan, and its weekly Shabbos congregation moved there.

In 2001 he founded Jewish Awareness America (JAAM).

In 2004, he launched the Yeshivalite program project, a yeshiva for those with a limited time in which to study.

In 2010 Jacobovitz announced he was moving to Israel, where he lives and teaches in Ramat Bet Shemesh.
