= Naham =

Naham: נחם (Hebrew); ناحام (Arabic)
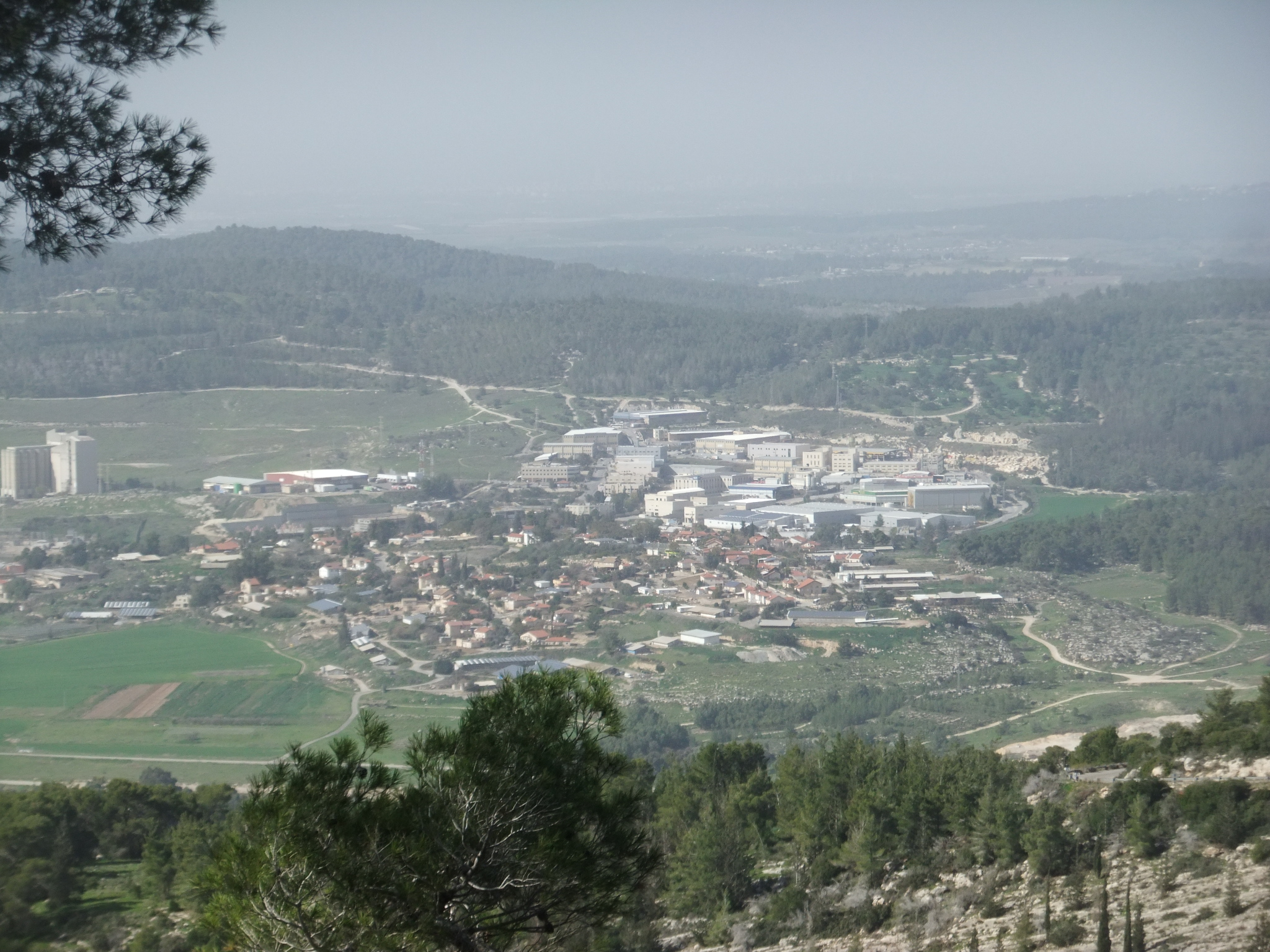

- Location within Jerusalem District
- Coordinates: 31°46′0″N 35°0′14″E
- Country: Israel
- District: Jerusalem
- Council: Mateh Yehuda
- Affiliation: Hapoel HaMizrachi
- Founded: 1950; 76 years ago
- Founder: Cochin and Yemenite Jews
- Population (2024): 626

Naham (Hebrew: נַחַם) is a moshav in central Israel. Located near Beit Shemesh, it falls under the jurisdiction of Mateh Yehuda Regional Council. In 2024 it had a population of 626.

== History ==
Moshav Naham was established in 1950 by immigrants from Yemen and Cochin on part of the lands of the moshava of Hartuv, abandoned during the 1948 Arab–Israeli War. It was named after a member of the Tribe of Judah in the Book of Chronicles 4:19 — "And the sons of the wife of Hodiah, the sister of Naham, were the father of Keilah the Garmite, and Eshtemoa the Maacathite."
