= Moshe Abutbul (politician) =

Israeli politician

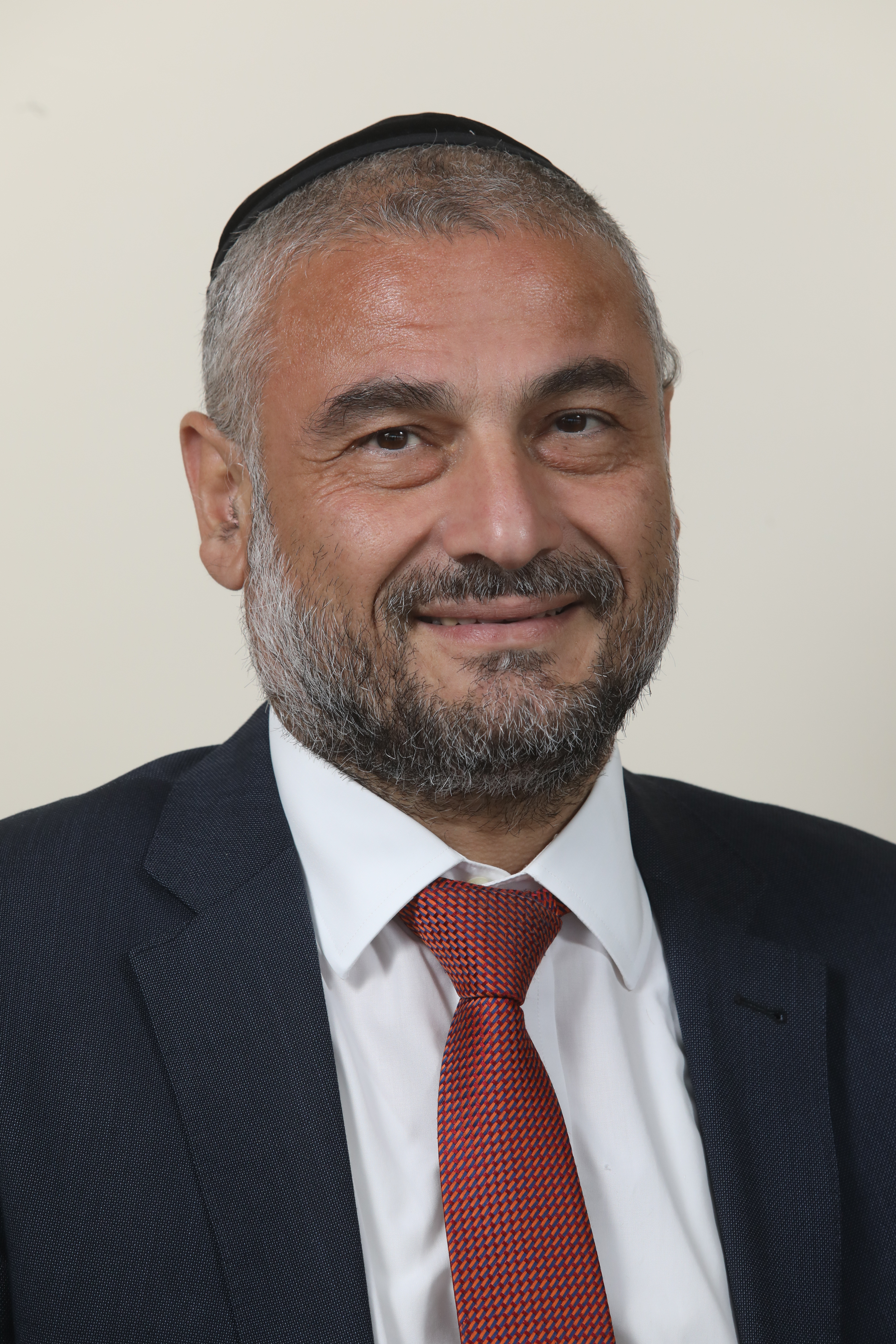
- Official portrait, 2019

Deputy Minister of Agriculture and Food Security
- In office 29 December 2022 – 19 July 2025
- Prime Minister: Benjamin Netanyahu
- Minister: Avi Dichter

Member of the Knesset
- In office 3 October 2019 – 10 November 2026

Mayor of Beit Shemesh
- In office 11 November 2011 – 20 November 2018
- Preceded by: Daniel Vakanin
- Succeeded by: Aliza Bloch

Personal details
- Born: Moshe Abutbul; 14 July 1965 (age 61) Beersheba, Israel
- Party: Shas (since 1993)
- Spouse: Esther Abutbul (m. 1986)
- Children: 8
- Education: Yeshivas Itri

Moshe Abutbul (Hebrew: מֹשֶׁה אַבּוּטְבּוּל; born 14 July 1965) is an Israeli politician. He served as a Knesset member from 2019 until 2026 and served as the Deputy minister of the Israeli Ministry of Agriculture and Rural Development. From 2008 until 2018, he served as the mayor of Beit Shemesh.

== Biography ==
Born in Beersheba, Moshe grew up in a traditional household and studied at a secular school. From age 9–14, he lived at Zion Blumenthal Orphanage, and later studied at the branch of the Itri Yeshiva in Beit Shemesh. He performed his military service as a driver in a tracker unit, and in the military rabbinate. When he married Esther in 1986, he settled in Beit Shemesh. The couple has eight children.

Abutbul was a radio broadcaster on Radio 10, an ultra-Orthodox pirate radio station, and acted in several films aimed at the ultra-Orthodox public. Over the years, he moved to public sector activity, and between 1993 and 2008, he served as a member of the Beit Shemesh City Council, in charge of the Engineering and Construction Division of the municipality, the Deputy Mayor, and his place on behalf of Shas.

He was elected mayor in November 2008, with 45.74% of the votes, defeating incumbent Mayor Daniel Vakanin.

In 2013, Abutbul ran again for mayor, facing Eli Cohen, a candidate for the Jewish Home party supported by the "Zionist bloc" parties. Abutbul was elected for a second term, with 51% of the vote. The election campaign was accompanied by tensions between ultra-Orthodox and secularists, and due to a genuine suspicion of forgery revealed by members of the ultra-Orthodox "power" faction, protests were held against Abutbul's victory. The court ordered re-election. They were held on 11 March 2014, and Abutbul was re-elected by an even larger margin (52%).

In the local elections in 2018, Abutbul ran for a third term, and lost, by 533 votes, to Aliza Bloch.

After the loss, he announced his retirement from public office. Still, Abutbul was placed ninth on the list of Shas for the 21st Knesset, but, as Shas did not receive nine seats, did not enter. He was stationed in the same place in elections to the 22nd Knesset, and subsequently entered the Knesset (as Shas received 9 seats in the elections). Abutbul served on various committees during his tenure in the Knesset, most notably chairing the "Lobby for the Preservation of the Sabbath", leading 30+ Knesset members seeking to preserve the status quo of the sanctity of Saturday as the day of rest of the Jewish State of Israel.

Abutbul resigned as the Deputy Agriculture Minister in July 2025.

Abutbol was reelected in the 2026 Israeli legislative election, but he resigned before the formation of the 26th Knesset to make way for other members as Shas fared badly in the election.
