= Partnership2Gether =

Partnership2Gether, or P2G, is a program connecting some 550 Jewish communities in the Diaspora with 45 Israel Partnership areas, primarily in Israel's peripheral Negev and Galilee districts. Partnership2Gether focuses on people-to-people interaction, building community and leadership.

When it was established in 1994 by the Jewish Agency for Israel, United Jewish Communities, and Keren Hayesod-United Israel Appeal, it was known as Partnership 2000. It represented a major transition from the Project Renewal-twinning model, which focused on transforming disadvantaged Israeli communities through building physical and social infrastructure.

Every year more than 10,000 volunteers work together in P2G.

== See also ==
- Town twinning
- Jewish Agency for Israel
