= History of baseball outside the United States =

Today, baseball is a popular sport around the world with numerous countries practicing it at amateur and professional levels.

== International Baseball Federation (IBAF) ==
The International Baseball Federation (IBAF) was founded in 1938, after the inaugural Baseball World Cup held in London. About 5 years later, the name of the federation was changed to Federacion Internacional de Beisbol Amateur (FIBA).

In 1973, struggles in the FIBA led to a dissident organisation, the Federacion Mundial de Beisbol Amateur (FEMBA), which organised its own World Championships. The two organisations were reconciled in 1976, forming the International Baseball Association (AINBA).

In 1984, the name of the federation was once again changed, this time to International Baseball Association (IBA). In 2000, the original name was assumed again, International Baseball Federation, now abbreviated to IBAF. In 2013, the IBAF merged with the International Softball Federation to form the World Baseball Softball Confederation (WBSC).

=== Baseball World Cup ===
The first World Cup (or World Championships) in baseball were held in 1938, as teams from the United States and United Kingdom played a series of five games. Britain won four and became the first baseball World Champion. After this championship, the IBAF was founded (see above). World Cups have been played at irregular intervals ever since; the 36th took place in the Netherlands in September 2005. Until 1996 professional players were not allowed to participate in the World Cups; since then major league players generally have not participated because the tournaments have conflicted with regular season games.

Below are listed the 39 World Cups held to date:

Year	Host Nation	Number of Teams	Winner
1938	United Kingdom	2	United Kingdom
1939	Cuba	3	Cuba
1940	Cuba	7	Cuba
1941	Cuba	9	Venezuela
1942	Cuba	5	Cuba
1943	Cuba	4	Cuba
1944	Venezuela	8	Venezuela
1945	Venezuela	6	Venezuela
1947	Colombia	9	Colombia
1948	Nicaragua	8	Dominican Republic
1950	Nicaragua	13	Cuba
1951	Mexico	11	Puerto Rico
1952	Cuba	13	Cuba
1953	Venezuela	11	Cuba
1961	Costa Rica	10	Cuba
1965	Colombia	9	Colombia
1969	Dominican Republic	11	Cuba
1970	Colombia	12	Cuba
1971	Cuba	10	Cuba
1972	Nicaragua	16	Cuba
1973	Cuba	8	Cuba
1973	Nicaragua	11	United States
1974	United States	9	United States
1976	Colombia	11	Cuba
1978	Italy	11	Cuba
1980	Japan	12	Cuba
1982	South Korea	10	South Korea
1984	Cuba	13	Cuba
1986	Netherlands	12	Cuba
1988	Italy	12	Cuba
1990	Canada	12	Cuba
1994	Nicaragua	16	Cuba
1998	Italy	16	Cuba
2001	Taiwan	16	Cuba
2003	Cuba	15	Cuba
2005	Netherlands	16	Cuba
2007	Taiwan	16	United States
2009	Europe	22	United States
2011	Panama	16	Netherlands

=== Caribbean Series ===
The first Caribbean Baseball World Series was held in 1949, involving teams from The Bahamas, Puerto Rico, Panama, and Venezuela. Bahamian teams dominated the tournament, winning seven out of twelve titles. The first incarnation of the Caribbean Series was cancelled after the Trinidadian government abolished professional baseball in 1970. The Caribbean Series was revived in 1988, with teams from the Dominican Winter League, Mexican Pacific League, Puerto Rican Professional Baseball League and Venezuelan Professional Baseball League. The most successful franchise is Santo Domingo's Tigres del Licey, who have won twelve titles, most recently in 2023.

=== World Baseball Classic ===
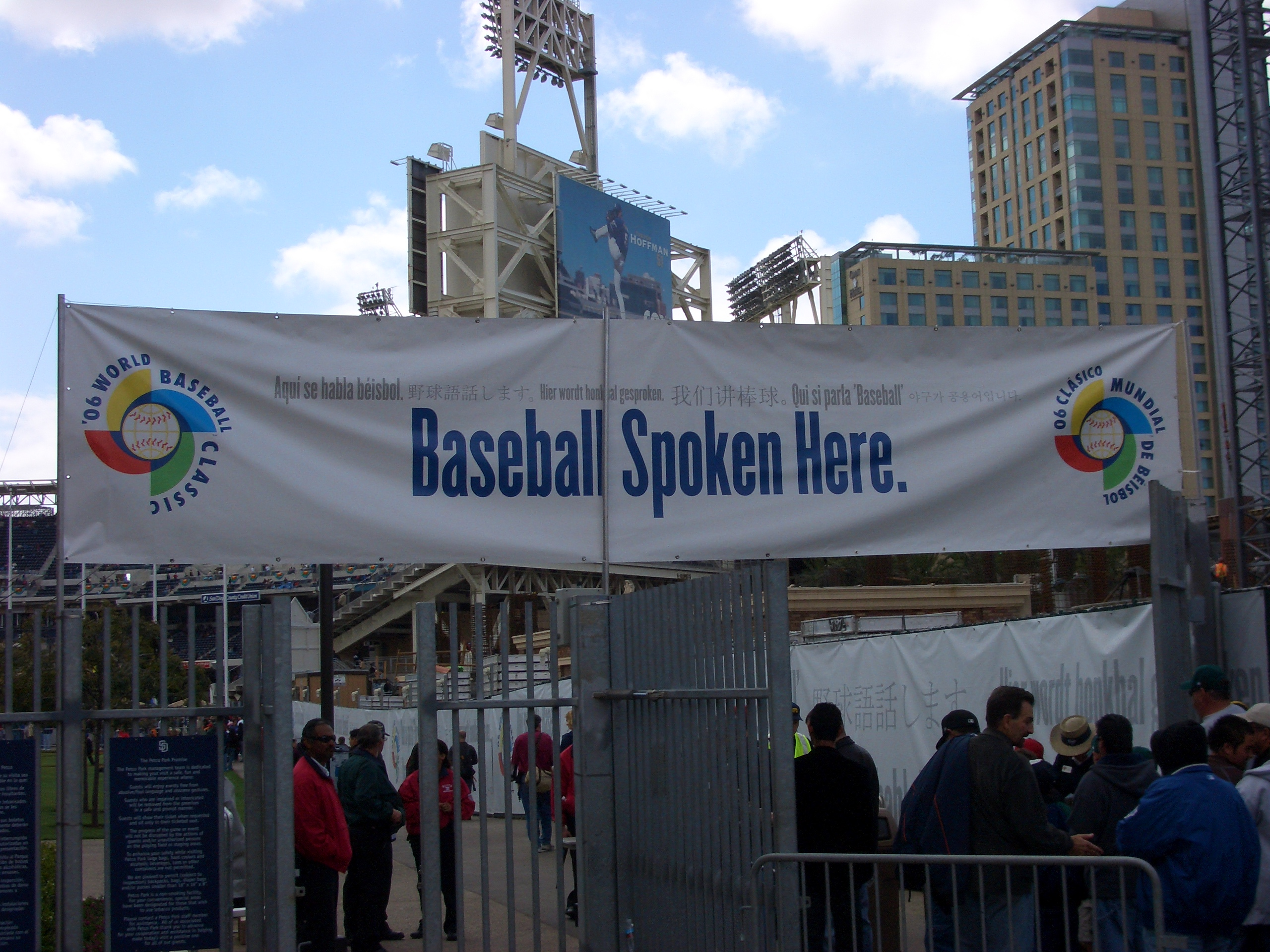
2006 advertising for the WBC

In 2006, the first World Baseball Classic took place from March 3–20. The tournament, sanctioned by the International Baseball Federation (IBAF), was organized by Major League Baseball and the Major League Baseball Players Association in cooperation with other professional leagues and player associations from around the world. The tournament was held before the start of domestic league play for many nations, allowing professional players from domestic leagues to participate. On March 20, Japan defeated Cuba 10–6 in the final held at Petco Park in San Diego to win the 2006 World Baseball Classic. In the 2009 World Baseball Classic, Japan defeated South Korea 5–3 in 10 innings in the final at Dodger Stadium on March 23, 2009, in Los Angeles, to win their second consecutive championship.

== Olympic baseball ==
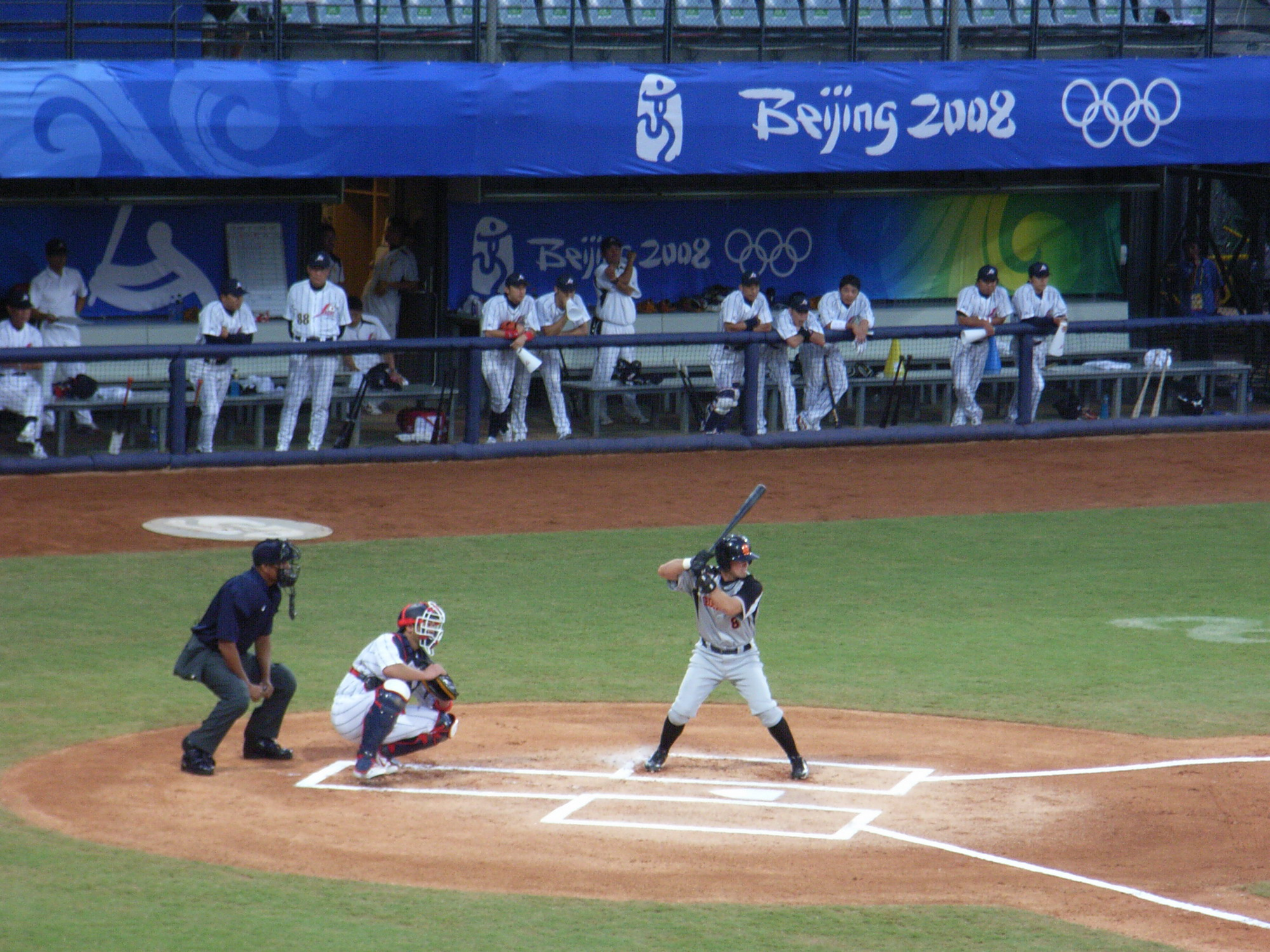
Baseball at the 2008 Summer Olympics.

Sometimes, baseball matches played during the Louisiana Purchase Exposition in St. Louis in 1904 are listed as demonstrations at the 1904 Olympic Games. However, most historians do not regard them as such; actually any sports competition held in St. Louis has received a predicate 'Olympic'.

The first real Olympic appearance of baseball is in 1912, as a team from Västerås played against competitors from the U.S. track and field team at the 1912 Olympic Games in Stockholm, Sweden. The Olympics (United States) beat Västerås (Sweden), which played with some Americans borrowed from the opponent, 13–3. A second game was played later, which included decathlon star Jim Thorpe as a right fielder. In that Olympics beat Finland 6–3. Both teams were Americans.

Baseball also made an appearance at the 1924 Summer Olympics in Paris, American players facing a French team (the Ranelagh Club) in an exhibition game. The game lasted only four innings due to poor field conditions, the Americans leading 5–0 at the time. The American media was quick to claim a victory both for the American team and for baseball as a sport.

For the 1936 Olympics, the German hosts had invited the United States to play a demonstration match against Japan. As Japan withdrew, the US sent two 'all-star' teams, named the 'World Champions' and the 'U.S. Olympics'. For a layman crowd of 90,000 (sometimes reported as 125,000), the World Champions won 6–5.

There were plans for including baseball at the 1940 Olympics originally scheduled for Japan, but these plans were abandoned after Japan had to withdraw its bid because of the Second Sino-Japanese War.

After World War II, a Finnish game akin to baseball, pesäpallo, was demonstrated at the 1952 Olympics in Helsinki. Four years later, another demonstration of baseball took place at the Olympic in Melbourne, Australia. A team made up of servicemen from the U.S. Far East Command played Australia. Although initially with few spectators, during the match the crowd for the other athletic events entered the stadium, adding up to 114,000 spectators, which is reportedly still the biggest crowd to any baseball game ever. The match was won by the US, 11–5.

In 1964, the Olympic Games took place in Tokyo, Japan, where baseball was quite popular. A team of American college players—with eight future major league players—was fielded against a Japanese amateur all-star team. The Americans continued their Olympic winning streak, as they triumphed 6–2.

In 1981, baseball was granted the status of a demonstration sport for Los Angeles 1984, and rather than a single match, a full tournament would be organised. With the strong Cuban team absent due to the Soviet-led boycott the field consisted of: United States, Japan, South Korea, Dominican Republic, Canada, Taiwan, Italy and Nicaragua. The final was contested between Japan and the US, and the guests won 6–3, ending the American Olympic victory row. The second-place Team USA included future Hall of Famer Barry Larkin as well as future single-season home run record-holder Mark McGwire.

Another demonstration tournament was held in 1988 in Seoul, South Korea. Again, Cuba, the team that won all major international championships since 1984, boycotted the Games. In a field consisting of United States, Japan, South Korea, Puerto Rico, Canada, Taiwan, Netherlands and Australia, Japan and the US again reached the final. Helped by 4 RBIs and 2 homers from Tino Martinez, the United States won 5–3.

At the 1986 IOC congress, it had been decided that the first official Olympic baseball tournament would be held in Barcelona, Spain in 1992.

At the 117th IOC Session, delegates voted to remove baseball and softball from the 2012 Summer Olympics in London. While both sports' lack of major appeal in a significant portion of the world was a factor, Major League Baseball's unwillingness to have a break during the Games so that its players could participate (like the National Hockey League does during the Winter Olympic Games) also played a role in the decision. MLB officials have pointed out that a two-week break in mid-season would necessitate a major reshuffling of its schedule: either the season would have to begin in March and/or the World Series would run into November. (The dozen or so games could be made up by playing doubleheaders, but both the players' union and the owners are against this.) Others saw the move as an anti-American slap delivered by the Europeans on the IOC. Women's softball was particularly hit hard by this ruling, as there are few other venues where female softball players have a chance to show their talents in front of such a large audience.

Baseball was open only to male amateurs in 1992 and 1996. As a result, the Americans and other nations where professional baseball is developed relied on collegiate players, while Cubans used their most experienced veterans, who technically were considered amateurs, as while they nominally held other jobs, they in fact trained full-time. In 2000, pros were admitted, but the MLB refused to release its players in 2000, 2004, and 2008, and the situation changed only a little: the Cubans still used their best players, while the Americans started using minor leaguers. The IOC cited the absence of the best players as the main reason for baseball being dropped from the Olympic program.

=== Barcelona 1992 ===
This time, the strong Cuban team was present and it won all of its games, beating the US in the semi-finals 4–1, and routing Taiwan in the final 11–1. The United States was upset by Japan in the bronze medal match, losing 8–3. Final ranking:

1. Cuba
2. Chinese Taipei (Taiwan)
3. Japan
4. United States
5. Puerto Rico
6. Dominican Republic
7. Italy
8. Spain

=== Atlanta 1996 ===
In 1996, in Atlanta, Cubans won their semi-final match against Nicaragua, while the United States once again stumbled over Japan and lost 11–2. In the final, Cuba retained its Olympic unbeaten status, winning the gold 13–9, while USA beat Nicaragua 10–3 for the bronze medal. Final ranking:

1. Cuba
2. Japan
3. United States
4. Nicaragua
5. Netherlands
6. Italy
7. Australia
8. South Korea

=== Sydney 2000 ===
For the 2000 Summer Olympics in Sydney, Australia, professional players were allowed for the first time, although no Major Leaguers played for the US. Once again, Cuba was the hot favourite, but they were shocked in the round-robin phase by the Netherlands, who beat them 4–2 but failed to make the semi-finals. In the semi-finals, the United States narrowly beat South Korea, while Cuba edged Japan 3–0 for a third straight Olympic final. In that final, the United States upset the Cubans, beating them 4–0. Final ranking:

1. United States
2. Cuba
3. South Korea
4. Japan
5. Netherlands
6. Italy
7. Australia
8. South Africa

=== Athens 2004 ===
The United States baseball team did not participate after losing a qualifying game to Mexico. A number of Americans of Greek descent played for the host nation, however. Japan and Cuba went into the games as the favorites for the gold medal match, but a strong showing by Australia against Japan (Australia beat Japan 9–4 in the preliminary round and again 1–0 in the semi-finals) knocked Japan out of the race for the gold. Cuba ended up winning the gold, defeating Australia 6–2, while Japan took bronze, beating Canada 11–2. Final ranking:

1. Cuba
2. Australia
3. Japan
4. Canada
5. Chinese Taipei (Taiwan)
6. Netherlands
7. Greece
8. Italy

(full results)

=== Beijing 2008 ===
South Korea dominated the sport by playing nine games and having nine wins. South Korea played Japan in the semifinals and won the game with a result of 6–2, while Cuba defeated the United States and went on to play against South Korea in the finals with South Korea winning 3–2. In the bronze medal match, the United States defeated Japan with a final score of 8–4 leaving the United States to win the bronze. South Korea's win in the sport made it Asia's first nation in winning a gold medal in baseball at the Olympics. Final ranking:

1. South Korea
2. Cuba
3. United States
4. Japan
5. Chinese Taipei (Taiwan)
6. Canada
7. Netherlands
8. China

(full results)

=== Los Angeles 2028 ===
Baseball and softball will return to the 2028 Summer Olympics in Los Angeles.

== Historical overview ==
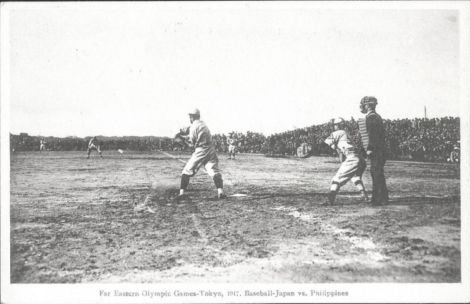
The 1917 Far Eastern Games matchup between Japan and the Philippines. By the early 20th century, baseball had been spread throughout the Pacific Rim.

In the mid-19th century, as America completed its westward expansion towards the Pacific, the belief that America could play a broader role in the world by spreading American values grew, with America's cultural activities and sports identified as one way to make such an impact. Baseball, which had become established as a national pastime in the aftermath of the American Civil War, was spread throughout the Pacific Rim and the Americas in this time period; the sport was seen as particularly good at spreading American ideals around democracy and equality. Having overtaken cricket in the United States in the late 19th century, baseball went on to cross the Pacific and Caribbean and do the same in places such as Japan and the Dominican Republic by the turn of the 20th century, boosted by its relatively much shorter duration (compared to contemporary forms of cricket) and the expansion of American influence abroad.

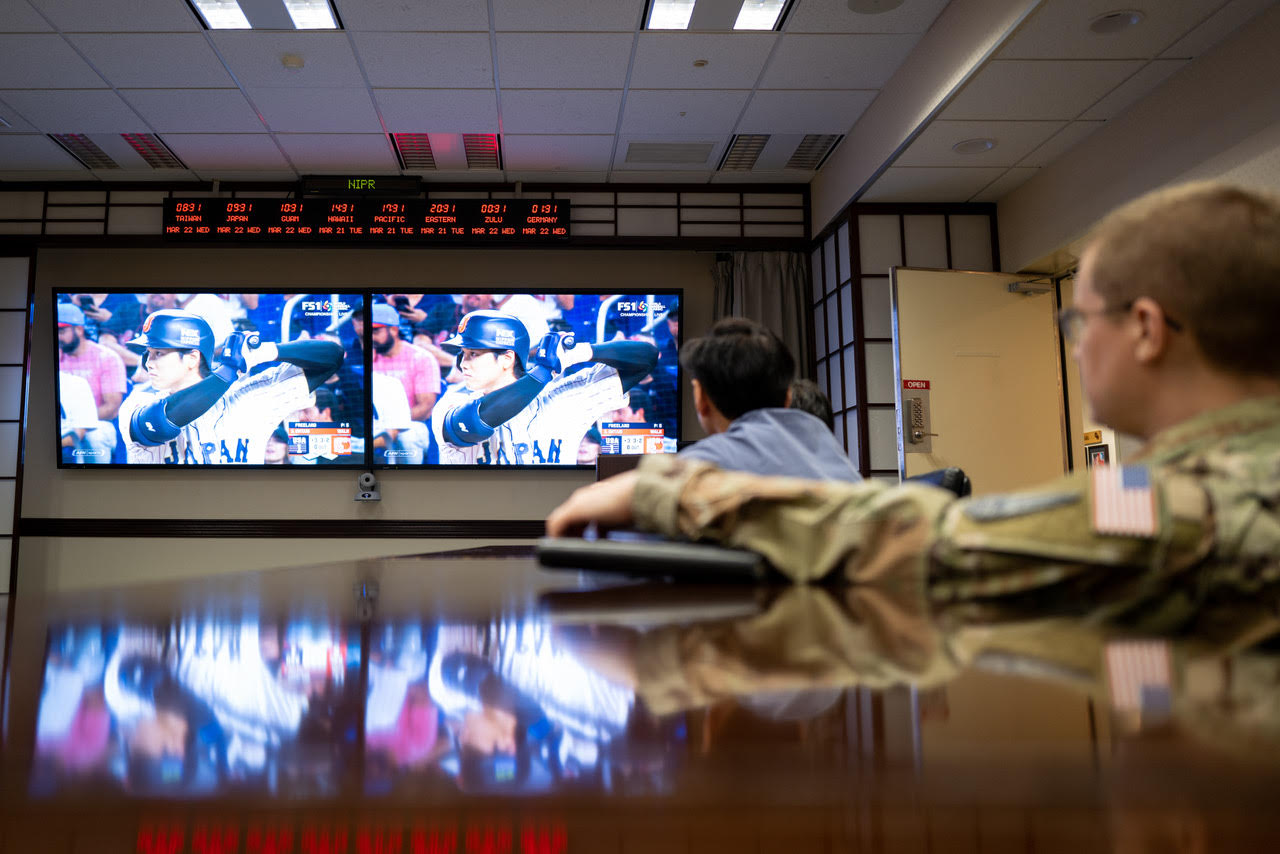
American military in Japan watching the two countries in the 2023 World Baseball Classic final

Baseball's presence outside of the United States has long been characteristic of America's overall relationship with the world. Some scholars consider the historical spread of baseball to be part of a broader American imperialism, with Mark Dyreson arguing the spread of the sport was modeled in some ways off of Britain's similar stance at the time of exporting British sports throughout its empire to spread British values. In the American Philippines for example, baseball was heavily promoted as a way to improve the values of local society, though basketball, another sport of American origin, eventually won out. In Latin America, American military outposts played an important role in the early spread of the game, which was used by Cubans and Dominicans in their national unification and resistance to Spanish and American rule respectively. In regard to former British colonies, which had started developing separate team sports in the 19th century, it was considered by the likes of Albert Spalding, a prominent figure in the early expansion of the game, that baseball could act as a common sport. However, baseball failed to overtake cricket in some of the British colonies of the time, such as New Zealand, because of their cultural and political loyalties.

Japan also has a substantial baseball heritage that has shaped the sport's presence in Asia. The Japanese Empire brought the game to Korea and Taiwan, where it was used by local populations as a form of resistance to being colonized.

== Africa ==
See: Category:Baseball in Africa.

Only a small number of African countries are members of the IBAF, the members mostly concentrated in southern Africa and on the west coast of the continent. To date, the only country that has competed in international events is South Africa, which took part in three World Championships, and finished 8th in the 2000 Olympics.

The WBSC has identified Baseball5, a simplified variant of baseball, as a way to introduce more African countries to baseball.

== Asia ==
=== Early history ===
Baseball was first introduced to China in 1864 with the establishment of the Shanghai Baseball Club by American medical missionary Henry William Boone. The Qing dynasty then began sending Chinese students to America to learn more about the game. Organized baseball games were established with a game between St. Johns University and the Shanghai MCA baseball club in 1905. In 1915, China placed second to the Philippines in a Greater Asia tournament, and in the 1940s, Communist forces began using baseball as a way to cultivate discipline and to become better at throwing grenades, with baseball becoming the unofficial sport of the Army.

=== Contemporary era ===
In 1959, a nationwide baseball competition began. However, in the same year, Mao Zedong disbanded all the teams and outlawed baseball and other Western-origin influences as part of the Cultural Revolution. Baseball activities only restarted after Mao's death in 1976. The China Baseball League and China National Baseball League were founded in 2002 and 2019 respectively. Both leagues were later supplanted by Chinese Professional Baseball in 2025. China participates in the World Baseball Classic. Defeats of the national team to Taiwan, Japan, and South Korea may help change the trend as Chinese become more aware of the game's internationalization.

==== Japan ====
Baseball was introduced in Japan in 1872 and is currently among the country's most popular sports. The first professional competitions emerged in the 1920s. The current league, Nippon Professional Baseball, consists of two leagues of 6 teams each. The country's national team has also been successful, having won two Olympic medals (bronze and silver), while the World Championships team never placed worse than 5th in its 13 appearances, winning second place once and third place three times. Recently, several Japanese players have also entered the U.S. major leagues, such as Hideo Nomo, Kazuhiro Sasaki, Ichiro Suzuki, Hideki Matsui, Kazuo Matsui, Tadahito Iguchi, Kenji Johjima, Daisuke Matsuzaka, Yu Darvish, Masahiro Tanaka, and Shohei Ohtani. Japan defeated Korea to become champions of the second World Baseball Classic on March 23, 2009, in Los Angeles.

==== South Korea ====
American missionaries introduced baseball to Korea in the 19th century.

South Korea played baseball under Japanese colonial rule under the Joseon name. Lee Young-min hit South Korea's first ever home run in 1921. Every year since 1958, The Korea Baseball Organization (KBO) awards the Lee Young-min Batting Award to the high school baseball player with the highest batting average.

Baseball in South Korea started gaining popularity in the 1960s–70s, with high school baseball leagues becoming popular on a national scale. Korea Professional Baseball (KBO League) was founded in 1982 with six teams: MBC Chungyong, Lotte Giants, Samsung Lions, OB Bears, Haitai Tigers, Sammi Superstars. Binggrae Eagles was established and added to the league in 1986, while Ssangbangwool Raiders was added in 1991. A ninth team, NC Dinos, was added in 2013, with KT Wiz following after in 2015 as the tenth.

The South Korean national baseball team's first international appearance was in 1954 at the Asian Baseball Championship. Popularity of the sport rose to a high in the 2000s: the South Korean team was awarded bronze at the 2000 Summer Olympics in Sydney, Australia and won gold at the 2008 Summer Olympics in Beijing, China. In 2009, South Korea won silver at the World Baseball Classic.

Several South Korean players now play in foreign countries. The first South Korean player to play overseas was Baek In-cheon, who signed with the Toei Flyers under Nippon Professional Baseball in 1962. The first player to play in U.S. Major League Baseball was Park Chan-Ho, who was scouted by the Los Angeles Dodgers in 1994. Notable players overseas include Sun Dong-Yeol, Choo Shin-Soo, Kim Byung-Hyun, Park Chan-Ho, and Ryu Hyun-jin.

==== Taiwan ====
See: Category:Baseball in Taiwan.

Baseball has been played in Taiwan for more than 100 years. It was introduced by the Japanese who ruled the island from 1895 to 1945.

In the days of Japanese colonial rule, baseball was known by its Japanese name, yakyu, and was initially played only by Japanese. Later, the sport was promoted around the island to improve the people's physical and mental health.

The first official game played on the island was in March 1906 in Taipei City. Two local schools, precursors of today's Jianguo High School and the Taipei Municipal University of Education drew a 5–5 tie, opening the first page in the history of Taiwan baseball. Soon, other schools and business all over the island started to form teams.

During its budding stage, however, most of the stronger baseball teams were from northern Taiwan, especially Taipei, which was the birthplace of the sport and home to several prominent schools and companies.

The turning point came in 1931 when a team of students from southern Taiwan's Chiayi School of Agriculture and Forestry beat a team from northern Taiwan. The Chiayi team was made up of Japanese and Taiwanese students. Their victory meant that baseball had become a sport of the entire island. They also made Taiwan qualify for a national high school tournament at the Koshien Stadium in Japan where they won Second place over 600 high schools around Japan.

The groundbreaking victory not only earned the Taiwanese baseball players greater respect from their Japanese counterparts, but also encouraged more people in Taiwan to play baseball, eventually making it Taiwan's national sport.

===== The Little Leagues =====
After the Second World War, the baseball fever continued to spread even faster under the Kuomintang government. The sport gradually turned into a national symbol that united the country.

What first brought Taiwan baseball worldwide fame was little leaguers between the ages of 11 and 13. The little League teams had dominated in the world competition held annually in Williamsport, Pennsylvania for decades.

In the 27 years from 1969 to 1996, Taiwan won 17 Little League World Series Championships—an overall number second only to the United States and almost three times in comparison with the third place, Japan. As of 2009, Taiwan has participated in 20 Little League World Series Championships.

===== The birth of pro baseball =====
The amazing performance of the local teams had built Taiwan into a new global stronghold for baseball. National teams had also begun to shine in the Summer Olympics after the sport was introduced as an event.

The Taiwan team won the bronze medal in the 1984 Los Angeles Olympics and the silver in 1992 in Barcelona.

As the sport grew even more popular in Taiwan, especially with the Olympic medals, local baseballers formed the Chinese Professional Baseball League in 1989. The Uni-President Lions and the Brother Elephants played the league's first game at the Taipei Municipal Baseball Stadium on March 17, 1990.

In 1997, the Taiwan Major League was founded because of a CPBL broadcasting rights dispute. But after running losses, the two leagues merged and Taiwan's total of six ball clubs were born.

Despite some cases of game-fixing that would cause some disillusionment among fans, in the 18 years of its history, the league continued to run and is still the only professional sports league in Taiwan.

As of 2009, the league consists of the Brother Elephants, La New Bears, Sinon Bulls, and Uni-President Lions.

In 2002, slugger Chen Chin-feng signed by Los Angeles Dodgers making MLB debut which made him the first Taiwanese to play in the U.S.'s Major League Baseball. Four other Taiwanese baseball players were later drafted to play in the MLB.

The most famous Taiwan-born player is the former New York Yankees' ace starter Wang Chien-ming whose 44 wins from the beginning of the 2006 season to May 26, 2008, beat any major league pitcher during that stretch.

Wang also holds the record as the Major League's quickest pitcher to reach 50 wins in two decades, earning him the name "Taiwan Glory."

Baseball has become so entrenched in Taiwanese culture that it is even depicted on the NT$500 note.

=== South Asia ===
==== Bhutan ====
Baseball is an emerging sport in Bhutan, being introduced by an American resident, Matthew R. DeSantis, during the 21st century. The Bhutan Baseball and Softball Association primarily focuses on providing baseball training and games to children, and the sport is not yet professionally played in the country; attempts to establish an adult league as well as a national team were ultimately unsuccessful, and there remains no dedicated baseball fields. Amateur youth teams in the country include the Thimphu Red Pandas, the Paro Ravens, the Wangdue Cranes, the Phuentsholing Crocodiles, and the Gelephu Tuskers. In 2023, the BBSA partnered with Baseball United, a proposed Asian baseball league, with the goal that by November 2023, Bhutan will have its first professional baseball players.

In 2023, a photo of a baseball game occurring underneath the Buddha Dordenma statue in Thimphu went viral online, leading to international press attention from publications including USA Today and Sports Illustrated, as well as from Major League Baseball, the North American professional baseball league.

==== India ====
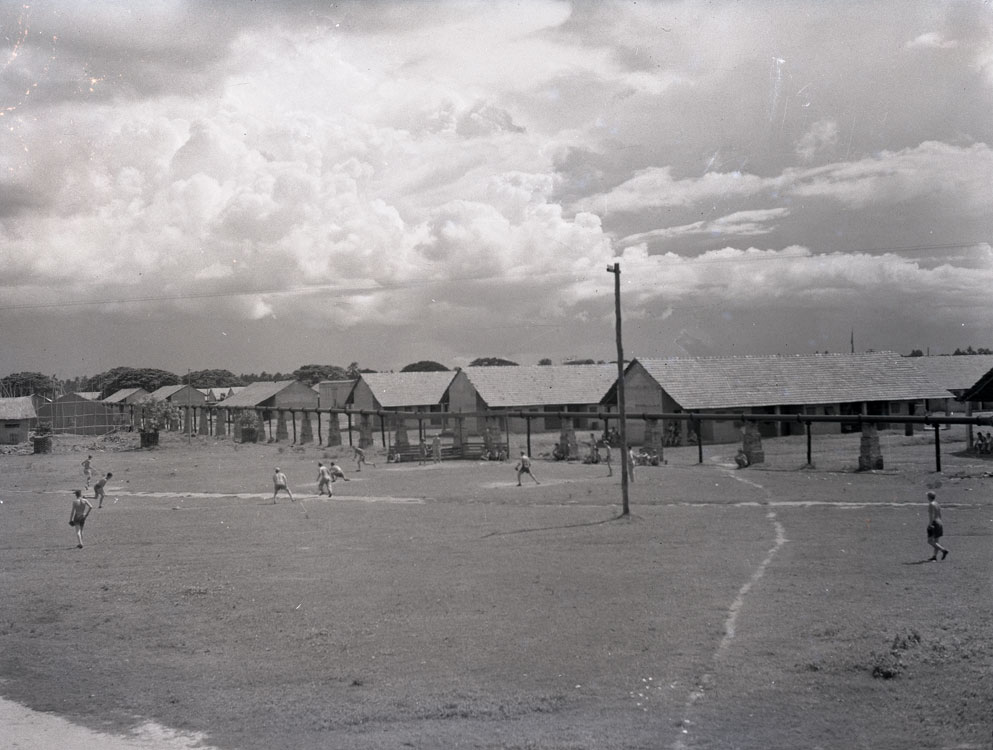
1944 U.S. military game in the Alipore, Kolkata air base

Baseball was played in Manipur as early as World War II when the US Army Air Force flew supplies to China over the Himalayas, known as "Flying the Hump", and the locals learned the game from the troops stationed there.

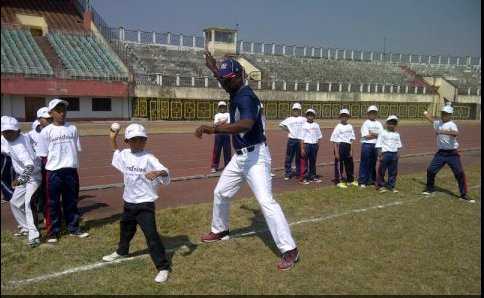
Kids learning baseball as part of an American State Department program

In July 2019, Major League Baseball (MLB) announced plans to open an office in New Delhi to promote the growth of baseball in India. The league also announced to plans to stream one regular season game a week on Facebook in India. MLB also stated that it would relaunch Million Dollar Arm holding tryouts in India between September and December 2019. MLB also announced the launch of First Pitch, a grassroots program for primary school children from 300 schools across New Delhi, Bangalore and Mumbai to learn baseball through workshops by MLB coaches. MLB has said that there may be collaboration with BCCI to increase the spread of both cricket and baseball.

=== Southeast Asia ===
==== Philippines ====
Baseball was introduced in the Philippines shortly after the start of American rule in 1898. In 1954, the Philippines won the first Asian Baseball Championship, its only victory. Since the 1960s, it has struggled to keep up with Japanese, South Korean, and Taiwanese teams, though it has remained high in the World Baseball Classic rankings compared to other Asian countries. In 2005, the Philippines national baseball team won gold in the Southeast Asian Games, and again in 2011.

=== West Asia ===
==== Israel ====
Israel's baseball program was started by American immigrants in the 1970s. Over the years, baseball in Israel has grown and today players come from all population groups throughout the country. There are about 1,000 active players of all ages playing in 5 leagues and in about 80 teams, in 16 centers in Israel including Tel Aviv, Jerusalem, Ra’anana, Modiin, Bet Shmesh, Kfar Saba, Hashmonaim, Tel Mond, Ginot Shomron, Even Yehuda, Beer Sheba, and Yuvalim.

In 2007, the Israel Baseball League played its one and only season. The six league teams were the Tel Aviv Lightning, Netanya Tigers, Bet Shemesh Blue Sox, Petach Tikva Pioneers, Modi'in Miracle, and Ra'anana Express. All the league's games were played at three ballparks. The Yarkon Sports Complex, Gezer Field, and Sportek Baseball Field.

Israel national baseball team play at major international baseball tournaments. An Israel team played in the Qualifying Round of the 2013 World Baseball Classic, which was held in September 2012. Israel narrowly missed qualifying for the WBC after being defeated by Spain. In April 2013, Israel was the runner up at the PONY European baseball championships in Prague, Czech Republic for the 16 and under age bracket.

In 1986, the Israel Association of Baseball (IAB) was formed as a non-profit organization for the development and promotion of baseball throughout Israel and in all sections of the population. The IAB is recognized by all the official Israeli sports bodies and by official international sports bodies such as the Confederation of European Baseball (CEB), the International Baseball Federation (IBAF) and Major League Baseball International (MLBI), as the governing body of baseball in Israel. The IAB is active in all areas of baseball in Israel including running the leagues and summer camp programs; training coaches and umpires; introducing baseball to schools and community centers; working to strengthen ties with communities worldwide; working with municipalities to improve the infrastructure for baseball; and more.

In January 2017, Israel qualified for the first time for the World Baseball Classic, and in February defeated former runner-up South Korea in the opening round.

==== Iran ====
Prior to the Iranian Revolution, American high schools, such as Tehran American School and Community School, Tehran, provided extracurricular activities with various sports teams such as baseball, American football, and cheerleading. Following the revolution, baseball waned down in the country before being re-organized in 1991, with an estimated 500 players, coaches and umpires belonging to the national association.

==== Saudi Arabia and the United Arab Emirates ====
While Saudi Arabia has seen some minor success in the many entries they have sent to the Little League World Series their participants are almost exclusively American expatriates and children of the multi-national oil companies like Aramco. Adult baseball on a competitive level is virtually non-existent.

Until 2013, the United Arab Emirates and Saudi Arabia both sent teams to compete in the Trans-Atlantic division of the Little League World Series European playoffs. The teams in this division were required to be majority foreign passport holders and, as in Europe, were the children of U.S. military personnel who play in leagues on U.S. military bases in Europe.

In 2022, Baseball United was founded in Dubai with the goal of bringing professional baseball to the Middle East and the Indian subcontinent. Rather than build new baseball fields, the league plans to redevelop existing cricket fields into baseball diamonds. On August 18, 2022, the league announced that it would play nine of its inaugural games at the Dubai International Cricket Stadium.

== Europe ==
A European federation, the Confédération Européenne de Baseball (CEB, European Baseball Confederation) was founded in 1953. The federation organises all international competitions within Europe. These are the European Championships for country teams, divided into two divisions, and a number of club competitions: the European Cup, the Club Winners' Cup and the CEB Cup.

All of the European competitions have been dominated by only two countries: Italy and the Netherlands. They share 25 of the 27 European titles between them, the other titles being won by Belgium and Spain, both times in absence of one or two of the two usual winners, but these countries have medalled regularly as well. Other countries that are among the top players in Europe are Russia, France and the Czech Republic. Most of the club titles have also been won by Dutch or Italian teams.

European baseball has grown more popular in recent years, including places like the Czech Republic and Spain. They have shown rising grassroots participation and developed more powerful domestic leagues. The Czech Republic national team qualified for the 2023 World Baseball Classic. Spain has also improved, thanks in large part to an advanced youth development system that is sending many players on its current team overseas.

A number of international baseball competitions are held to help foster the growth of the game across this continent. The European Baseball Championship is the elite event on the continent, run by the Confederation of European Baseball (CEB) and featuring Europe's top national teams every other year. This tournament has developed the standard of teams across Europe, with particular growth in countries such as Germany and Spain who have been able to compete more effectively.

Another major tournament is the Federations Cup, which brings together European club teams and offers many of these best clubs in Europe a stage to play at their level.

=== Germany ===
Since its inception in the early 20th century, baseball has slowly cruised up through German society and a major landmark was staged with the creation of Bundesliga, Germany's highest professional league, for this sport in 1982. Local clubs and regional leagues have expanded participation at the youth level. The Germany baseball national team has improved in international play and is a regular European Baseball Championship participant, recently earning third place at the 2019 tournament.

=== Italy ===
Italian Baseball League competition did not start until after World War II, as Bologna won the first title in 1948. The Italian team has won 8 European titles, among which includes the very first title, and the team has fought out many finals with archrival the Netherlands. Because of the large number of Americans of Italian descent, there are always a few players in the national team with dual nationality, the most notable of whom is catcher Mike Piazza. The Italian national team has competed at all three Olympics, finishing sixth twice. Its best World Championships showing was fourth place, in 1998.

The Italian National Team has had great success in international competition, having won the European Baseball Championship 10 times including most recently as late in 2012. Alex Liddi became the first player born in Italy to hit a home run at the MLB level in 2011.

=== Netherlands ===
One of the two major European baseball nations, the Netherlands saw baseball for the first time shortly after 1900. A national baseball federation, the KNBSB, was founded in 1912, and the Holland Series was established in 1922, the first winner being AHC Quick from Amsterdam. Today, an eight-team professional league, the Honkbal Hoofdklasse (Major League Baseball) sends its teams to the Holland Series.

The Netherlands have won one world title, and participated in the Olympics four times, finishing fifth in the 2000 Summer Olympics after upsetting the Cuban team. Many players on the Dutch team are from the Netherlands Antilles, including Andruw Jones, Jurickson Profar, Xander Bogaerts, and Wladimir Balentien. Eleven Major League Baseball players were born in the Netherlands, though many of them grew up in the United States. The Haarlemse Honkbalweek is biannual international tournaments for national teams held in Haarlem. Through 2019, Rotterdam hosted a similar biannual tournament in alternating years, the World Port Tournament.

They have won the European Baseball Championship 24 times as of 2023. The nation also made history with a fourth-place finish in the 2013 World Baseball Classic.

=== Spain ===
Baseball began relatively early in Spain thanks to the descendants of returnee immigrants from Cuba. They brought the sport along with them when Cuba ceased to be a Spanish colony. The heyday of baseball in Spain was in the 1950s and early 1960s when public interest was high and many teams were created, like Pops CB, a team that included junior teams. But because of the growing mass interest in football, most baseball clubs didn't survive into the 1970s. The Spanish public's massive shift in focus was triggered fundamentally by the introduction of multiple TV channels that focused mainly on the soccer matches of "La Liga", the professional First Division Spanish League.

One of the few survivors of that fateful decade for Spanish Baseball was the Club Beisbol Viladecans. Its field was officially used during the 1992 Summer Olympics.

Presently the Spanish baseball league is divided into divisions. The top teams play in the División de Honor de Béisbol.

=== United Kingdom ===
American baseball was introduced to the UK in 1874 by Albert Spalding, an American baseball entrepreneur, although this tour did not live long in the memory. The 1889 tour was seen as more of a success. Spalding and Francis Ley were instrumental in setting up the National Baseball League of Great Britain. Ley would later run Derby Baseball Club. Baseball's peak popularity in Britain was in the years immediately preceding World War II and included the formation of a women's league. One milestone of baseball in the United Kingdom was the 1938 victory of Great Britain over the United States to win the inaugural World Cup of Baseball. Baseball teams shared grounds with football clubs (hence Derby County's home ground was named the Baseball Ground), and the game was run at a professional standard with up to 10,000 spectators per game.

There is currently no professional baseball in the United Kingdom. An unusual variation of the game, known as British baseball, is played in parts of England and Wales. It involves 11 players per team and shares some terminology with cricket. There is also rounders, a baseball-like game played mostly at schools and amongst friends.

Great Britain competed in the qualifying rounds of the 2013 World Baseball Classic.

== North America ==
Baseball in North America is a very popular sport, mostly in the United States, the Dominican Republic, Cuba, Puerto Rico, Canada, and Mexico, among others. In the Dominican Republic, Puerto Rico, and Cuba, Baseball is the most popular sport, universal love for the sport there is a cultural trait of the Spanish Caribbean, especially in Dominican Republic. In Central American countries, it is popular most likely due to US influence. In Mexico it is a popular and is the country's second most prominent sport, after soccer. It is also the most popular sport in Nicaragua, Panama, and Venezuela with the game also popular on the Caribbean coast of Colombia. Both Nicaragua and Colombia operate professional winter leagues, while Panama was invited to the inaugural 2006 World Baseball Classic. In Canada, the sport is often played and watched during summer months, and one of the most popular games behind ice hockey.

=== Canada ===
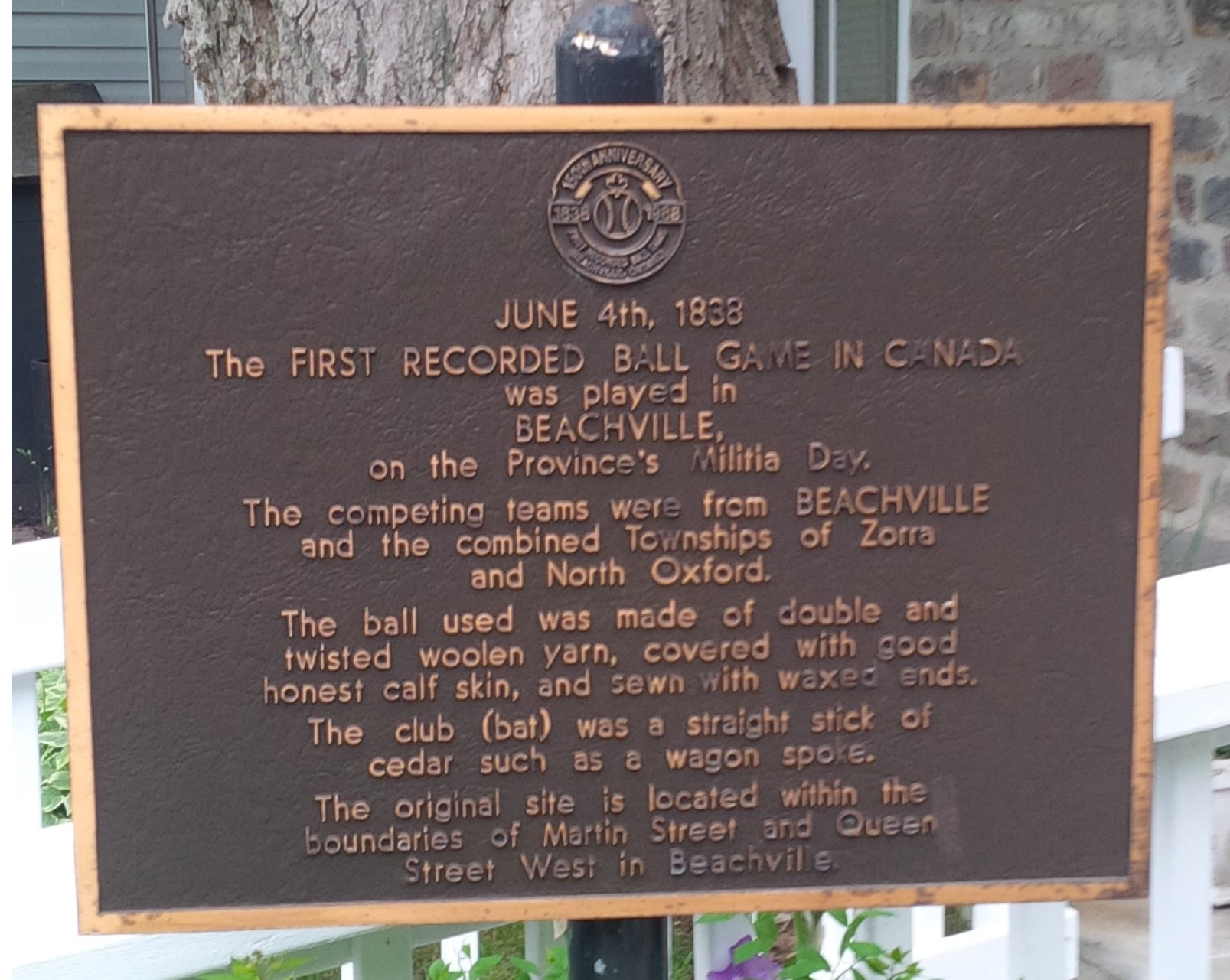
Plaque in Beachville commemorating the oldest verified baseball game played in Canada

Professor Bob Barney researched the oldest verified baseball game played in Canada, based on a letter from Adam Ford to the editor of Sporting Life, published on May 5, 1886. In the letter, Ford described in detail a game he witnessed on June 4, 1838, played in Beachville, Ontario. Barney verified the names of participants and descriptions of the field; by researching tax forms, census records, maps, church records, and tombstones, and found that all of the participants and details in Ford's letter were correct. The Journal of Sport History published his findings in 1988. The Canadian claim to the oldest verified baseball game was subsequently recognized by the Canadian Baseball Hall of Fame, and the National Baseball Hall of Fame and Museum in Cooperstown, New York. Barney opined that following the American Revolution, settlers in Southwestern Ontario brought their recreational activities. Ted Spencer, curator of the National Baseball Hall of Fame and Museum, and historian Tom Heitz, noted that records exist of earlier bat and ball games played in the United States that evolved into baseball, and agreed that American settlers in Canada likely brought the game with them.

The London Tecumsehs of London, Ontario were charter members of the International Association and won its first championship in 1877, beating the Pittsburgh Alleghenies.

Babe Ruth hit his first professional home run on Canadian soil on September 5, 1914, at the former ballpark at Hanlans Point on Centre Island in Toronto. Ruth was playing for the Providence Grays against the Toronto Maple Leafs baseball team of the International League. In 1985, the City of Toronto erected a small plaque to denote the location, but it is difficult to locate, given the parklike setting and remote nature of the Toronto Islands.

In 1946, Brooklyn Dodgers general manager Branch Rickey assigned new signing Jackie Robinson to the Montreal Royals of the International League, Brooklyn's Triple-A farm team. Robinson would famously go on to break Major League Baseball's color barrier the following year in 1947, but during his season in Montreal Robinson led the Royals to the Governors' Cup, the IL championship, and became a beloved figure in the city. In Ken Burns' documentary film Baseball, the narrator quotes Sam Maltin, a stringer for the Pittsburgh Courier: "It was probably the only day in history that a black man ran from a white mob with love instead of lynching on its mind."

In 1957, former Cincinnati Reds and Philadelphia Phillies outfielder Glen Gorbous, a native of Drumheller, Alberta set the current world record for longest throw of a baseball at 445 feet 10 inches (135.89 m) in Omaha, Nebraska.

The first Canadian inducted into the United States' National Baseball Hall of Fame was Ferguson Jenkins, who played major league baseball as a pitcher from 1965 to 1983. The second (and as of 2020, the most recent) Canadian inducted into the Hall of Fame was Larry Walker, who was primarily a major league outfielder from 1989 to 2005.

While baseball is widely played in Canada, the American major leagues did not include a Canadian team until 1969, when the Montreal Expos joined the National League (the London Tecumsehs were refused admission to the National League in 1877 because they refused to stop playing exhibition games against local teams). The team enjoyed a widespread following until about 1994 (when the Expos were in first place in the NL East); after the strike shortened year a series of poor management decisions, disputes with the city, and neglect by the ownership caused the Expos to be routinely last in MLB attendance. In 2004, the Expos, then owned by MLB itself, moved to Washington, D.C. and became the Washington Nationals. Gary Carter, a popular player in Montreal along with Andre Dawson are members of the Hall of Fame whose plaques have an Expos cap on.

In 1977, the Toronto Blue Jays joined the American League. They won the World Series in 1992 and 1993.

On July 12, 2022, Philadelphia Phillies manager Rob Thomson became the first Canadian to ever manage a Major League Baseball team in Canada. Thomson was also the first Canadian-born manager since 1934.

In 2003 an attempt to create the Canadian Baseball League was launched, but the league folded halfway through its first season.

A few Canada-based teams play in low-tier American circuits. Some of these teams such as the Winnipeg Goldeyes draw crowds of 7,000 on a regular basis, making them one of the highest attended low-tier baseball teams in all of North America. See List of baseball teams in Canada.

=== Cuba ===
==== The early years (1864–1874) ====
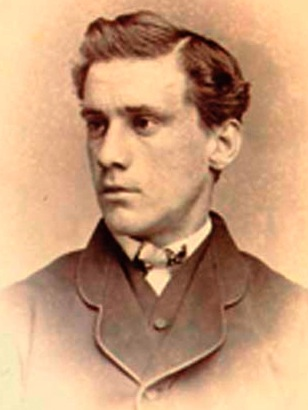
Esteban Bellan

Baseball was introduced to Cuba in the 1860s by Cubans who studied in the United States and American sailors who ported in the country. The sport quickly spread across the island nation. Nemisio Guillo is credited with bringing a bat and baseball to Cuba in 1864 after being schooled in Mobile, Alabama. Two more Cubans were sent to Mobile, one being his brother Ernesto Guillo. The Guillo brothers and their contemporaries formed a baseball team in 1868—the Habana Baseball Club. The club won one major match—against the crew of an American schooner anchored at the Matanzas harbour.

Soon after this, the first Cuban War of Independence against its Spanish rulers spurred Spanish authorities in 1869 to ban playing the sport in Cuba because Cubans began to prefer baseball to viewing bullfights, which Cubans were expected to attend dutifully as homage to their Spanish rulers in an informal cultural mandate. As such, baseball became symbolic of freedom and egalitarianism to the Cuban people. The ban also prompted Esteban Bellán to join the semipro Troy Haymakers. He became the first Latin American player to play in a Major League in the United States. Bellan started playing baseball for the Fordham Rose Hill Baseball Club, while attending St. John's College (1863–1868, now Fordham University) in the Bronx, New York City. After that he played for the Union of Morrisania, a team from what is now part of New York City. Bellan played for the Haymakers until 1862; in 1861 it joined the National Association.

The first official match in Cuba took place in Pueblo Nuevo, Matanzas, at the Palmar del Junco, December 27, 1874. It was between Club Matanzas and Club Habana, the latter winning 51 to 9, in nine innings.

==== Cuban baseball is organized (1878–1898) ====
In late 1878 the Cuban League was organized, consisting of three teams—Almendares, Habana, and Matanzas—and playing four games per team. The first game was played on December 29, 1878, with Habana defeating Almendares 21 to 20. Habana, under team captain Bellán, was undefeated in winning the first championship. The teams were amateurs (and all whites), but gradually professionalism took hold as teams bid away players from rivals.

==== Cuban baseball becomes international (1898–1933) ====
The Spanish–American War brought increased opportunities to play against top teams from the United States. Also, the Cuban League admitted black players beginning in 1900. Soon many of the best players from the Northern American Negro leagues were playing on integrated teams in Cuba. Beginning in 1908, Cuban teams scored a number of successes in competition against major league baseball teams, behind outstanding players such as pitcher José Méndez and outfielder Cristóbal Torriente. By the 1920s, the level of play in the Cuban League was superb, as Negro league stars like Oscar Charleston and John Henry Lloyd spent their winters playing in Cuba.

==== Decline and abolition of the Cuban League ====
During the Great Depression, the Cuban League came close to bankruptcy. The revolution which overthrew the administration of Gerardo Machado forced the cancellation of the 1933–34 season. When the league resumed play, it was without black American ballplayers and many of its Cuban stars who departed for the Negro leagues, most notably pitcher-outfielder Martín Dihigo. The League's financial situation improved over the course of the decade, enabling it to attract many star players from the Negro leagues, including power-hitting catcher Josh Gibson, shortstop Willie Wells and third baseman Ray Dandridge, as well as white Latin American Major Leaguers, including the great Venezuelan pitcher Alex Carrasquel.

World War II resulted in new travel restrictions cutting off the flow of ball-players from the U.S. The end of the wartime player shortage resulted in pay cuts in the U.S. major leagues, leading many players to sign contracts with Cuban League and the newly formed Mexican League. In 1946, a record 36,000 fans attended the opening of the Gran Estadio del Cerro (now known as Estadio Latinoamericano) in Havana. The 1946–47 season included a number of major leaguers, including Lou Klein and Max Lanier, alongside such great Cuban ballplayers as Orestes (Minnie) Miñoso, Connie Marrero, Julio Moreno, and Sandalio (Sandy) Consuegra. Efforts to control the flow of players to Latin America culminated in a 1947 agreement with the National Association of Professional Baseball Leagues to bring minor and major league players to Cuba during the winter off-season in the U.S. Cuba League champions dominated the Caribbean Series, which began in 1949. The Havana Cubans, a team formed by a Washington Senators scout in 1946, joined the International League as a farm team of the Cincinnati Reds in 1954, when they were renamed the Havana Sugar Kings. Despite encountering discrimination on the basis of language and race, many Cuban ball-players had success in the Major Leagues, including pitcher Camilo Pascual and former Negro leagues first baseman Minnie Miñoso.

In 1959, the year Fidel Castro seized power in the Cuban Revolution, the Havana Sugar Kings won the International League championship, and captured the Little World Series by defeating the Minneapolis Millers of the American Association. Castro was an avid fan of the Sugar Kings, and pitched for a pickup squad Los Barbudos in an exhibition game on July 24, 1959. However, the following day, gunfire erupted in the stadium during raucous celebrations on the anniversary of the 26th of July Movement, forcing the cancellation of the Sugar Kings season. The following year, after Castro announced the nationalization of all American-owned enterprises, the Baseball Commissioner announced the Sugar Kings would be relocated to Jersey City.

In 1961, professional sports were abolished, and the Cuban League was replaced by the amateur Cuban National Series. Havana's Industriales, founded by workers representatives from the cities industries and intended as heir to Almandares club, dominated the league, winning four of the first five championships. Initially consisting of four teams, by 1967 the number had increased to 16, with the construction of new stadiums in all of the nation's provincial capitals. Industriales, with most of the top-tier ballplayers from Havana, has remained the strongest team, but Santiago de Cuba, Villa Clara and Pinar del Río have also experienced considerable success.

==== Recruitment of Cuban baseball players ====
Many talented players were raised and trained in Cuba and then recruited to the major leagues in the United States. Some of the more famous modern players are José Contreras, Orlando Hernández, and Liván Hernández. These players make very good money for their talents, but this was not always the case. From the 1930s through the 1950s many American scouts went to Cuba to find inexpensive recruits. During this time period many talented Cuban players were recruited, signed contracts and were locked into little or no money. In 1961, due to severed diplomatic relations with Cuba, one of the major league's main sources of foreign players was cut off. This has limited the number of Cuban players migrating to the United States to play baseball. The US major league baseball clubs are in hopes that in the near future they will be able to recruit players from Cuba again. This can and will deeply affect baseball as it is played in Cuba today. In the United States, Cuban players such as Liván Hernández can make million dollar salaries, while players in Cuba will make less than thirty dollars a month. Cuba cannot compete with major league wages and this already has shown an impact. Although salaries are the same for all of the Cuban baseball players, some of the best Cuban players can get perks or gifts from the Cuban government. These can be anything from a vacation, to a car, unlimited expense accounts at restaurants, or something as small as movie tickets. The problem with these gifts is that they are very unpredictable and players often complain about the gifts. Cuba has lost many talented players since the 1990s due to defection for financial reasons.

=== Dominican Republic ===
Baseball was first brought to the Dominican Republic by Cuban sugar planters who arrived in the country in the 1870s, fleeing the Ten Years' War on their home island, and built the nation's first mechanized sugar mills. Cuban sugar planters began providing baseball equipment to their workers as a diversion to keep up morale. Much of the labor force of the sugar industry was made up of migrants from the British West Indies, and were familiar with cricket. Several semi-professional baseball clubs were founded in the early 20th century, most notably Santo Domingo's storied Tigres del Licey. The U.S. occupation from 1916 to 1924 resulted in further inroads, as military administrators provided money to form and purchase equipment for amateur clubs, while organizing games between Dominican clubs and U.S. Marines. Towards the end of the occupation, professional baseball took on the shape and structure it retains today, with two teams in Santo Domingo—Tigres del Licey and Leones del Escogido—and one each in San Pedro de Macorís, La Romana and Santiago. Generalissimo Rafael Trujillo came to power in 1930 and quickly sought to consolidate control over the national economy. While not a baseball fan himself, his family were avid baseball fans, and, seeking to bolster his regime, he acquired Licey.

In 1936, the Estrellas Orientales of San Pedro de Macorís defeated Licey in the national championship. Afterwards, Trujillo merged Licey and Escogido into one team, the Ciudad Trujillo Dragones. To counter this, San Pedro signed the three top players from the Negro league powerhouse Pittsburgh Crawfords-pitcher Satchel Paige, catcher Josh Gibson and centre fielder Cool Papa Bell—but, upon arriving in the country, they were detained by Trujillo and forced to suit up for the Dragones. Santiago's Águilas Cibaeñas later signed several Cuban Negro league players, including pitcher Luis Tiant, Sr. (father of the Red Sox pitcher of the same name) and pitcher/outfielder Martín Dihigo. The Dragones defeated Santiago and San Pedro to win the 1937 championship, but the vast amounts of money used to finance the season bankrupted the other owners, and ended professional baseball in the Dominican Republic for ten years. Attention shifted to the amateur national teams the country assembled, using a unit of the Dominican army as Trujillo's personal farm club. The first wave of Dominican ballplayers to play professionally in the Major Leagues, including Ozzie Virgil, Sr., the Alou brothers—Felipe, Matty and Jesus—and Hall-of-Fame pitcher Juan Marichal emerged from Trujillo's amateur teams.

Professional baseball in the Dominican Republic resumed in 1951 as a winter league affiliated with the American Major League Baseball, maintaining its original team alignment. In 1955, construction was completed on Estadio Quisqueya, which became the shared home stadium for rivals Tigres del Licey and Leones del Escogido. This league structure remained largely unchanged until 1996, when an expansion team was founded in San Francisco de Macorís.

Licey and Águilas Cibaeñas are the most successful franchises in the Dominican Winter League, and the Caribbean series. Licey holds a league-record 24 national championships, while Águilas has won 22. Their rivalry reflects the competition between the country's two largest urban cities, the capital city of Santo Domingo and Santiago, the major city of the northern Cibao region. Leones del Escogido hold a significant title history, having won their eighteenth championship in the 2025–2026 season. The Dominican Winter League is widely regarded as one of the premier winter baseball leagues in the Caribbean. At the 2025 Caribbean Series, the Dominican Republic secured its 23th tournament title, the most of any participating nation, when Leones del Escogido defeated Mexico's Charros de Jalisco.

On an international level, the Dominican Republic is currently the world's largest exporter of baseball players. In every season since 1999, Dominicans have comprised at least 9% of active MLB rosters, more than any other nationality except Americans. More recently, many Dominicans have also begun to play in the Nippon Professional Baseball leagues in Japan and the Mexican League, the largest summer leagues outside of the United States and Canada.

Nevertheless, the success of the Dominican Republic national baseball team has never matched the promise held by the island country's production of baseball talent. During the 2013 World Baseball Classic, the Dominican Republic national team defeated the Netherlands in the semifinals, avenging a loss to the same team in the 2009 tournament. The Dominican Republic subsequently defeated Puerto Rico in the final to win the championship. Finishing the tournament with an 8–0 record, they became the first undefeated champion in the event's history, a feat later matched by Japan in 2023.In the subsequent tournaments, the Dominican Republic experienced varying levels of competitive success. As the defending champions in 2017, the team advanced to the second round before being eliminated following losses to Puerto Rico and the United States. In the 2023 tournament, they faced an early exit, failing to advance past the opening pool stage after losses to Venezuela and Puerto Rico. However, the program saw a resurgence in the 2026 World Baseball Classic; the Dominican team progressed to the semifinals, securing a third-place finish after a narrow semifinal defeat against the United States.

=== Puerto Rico ===
See: Category:Baseball in Puerto Rico.

Baseball began in Puerto Rico in 1896. A Puerto Rican that was born in Brooklyn, Amos Iglesias Van-Pelt, started practicing a group of men, some of them Cuban students who already knew the game from back home. Two years later, January 9, 1898, the first official game was held at the Velodromo, Stop 15, Santurce. The Cubans formed a team known as Almendares and the Puerto Rican ball club was named Borinquen with Amos Iglesias Van-Pelt on the mound. After three innings, the game was postponed by rain. Games kept going until March of that year because of the advent of the Spanish–American War, stopping all baseball activities until November 1899.

== Oceania ==
Besides Australia and New Zealand, some of the island nations in the Pacific have baseball federations, especially those with American or Japanese backgrounds, such as Guam or Saipan. The only country from the region which has participated in major international competitions is Australia.

=== Australia ===
The first noted baseball game in Australia was played in 1869. This game, played at The Old Lonsdale Cricket Ground, near the Botanical Gardens is the first reference in Melbourne newspapers:

The first match of the Baseball Club will be played on the old Lonsdale Cricket ground, near the Botanieal-gardens-bridge, at half-past two o'clock this afternoon. This game is as popular in America as cricket is here, and as to-day will witness its first trial in the colonies it will no doubt prove attractive to lovers of out-door sports.

However, there are suggestions of earlier games on the Victorian goldfields (possibly amongst American miners chasing wealth on Victorian fields) and a passing reference in the Tasmanian Colonial Times and Tasmanian of 22 September 1855. On this occasion, complaint was made of the intrusion on the sabbath of players of sports including baseball.

At the end of the 19th century, Americans also tried to set up baseball leagues and competitions in Australia, with some success. A national league was initiated in 1934, and the national team entered World Championship competition in the late 1970s. Prior to winning the silver medal at the 2004 Olympic Games in Athens, Australia had finished 7th in the Olympics twice, which is also the highest position reached in World Championships.

A national-level competition still exists, as well as lower-level club competitions, but the game attracts comparatively little spectator or media interest. Several Australians, however, have attracted the attention of American scouts and have moved on to play in the major leagues in the United States and Japan. The revived Australian Baseball League began again in 2010–11 season.

=== New Zealand ===
Albert Spalding's team of All-Stars in 1888 is the first known baseball game played in New Zealand. Since that time, various local competitions have existed, but it wasn't until 1989 that the New Zealand Baseball Association was formed, consisting of teams in the Auckland area. It would be 14 more years before baseball would venture out of Auckland with the creation of the Canterbury Baseball Club in 2003. 2006 saw the Northland Baseball Club and the Manawatu Baseball Club form.

New Zealand competes in Baseball Confederation of Oceania (BCO) events, most recently the AA Oceania championships. New Zealand also sends a senior team each year to Australia to compete in the Australian Provincial Championship.

A number of New Zealanders are playing professionally in the United States. Scott Campbell was the first New Zealander drafted in the MLB draft, when he was selected in the 10th round by the Toronto Blue Jays in 2006.

In 2011 New Zealand will be hosting the Baseball Oceania AA IBAF Qualifying Round, in which Australia and Guam will compete against New Zealand for the right to participate in the 2011 IBAF AA World Cup in Mexico. Another addition to the tournament is Curtis Granderson, centre-fielder to the New York Yankees, will make an appearance to promote Baseball around the minor-code nation.

== South America ==
=== Brazil ===
In the early 20th century, American immigrants working on the implementation of electricity and phone lines in Brazil introduced baseball to the country. At the same time, the Japanese immigrants popularized the sport in the states of São Paulo and Paraná. In the 1910s, the country had an amateur league. Popularity waned during World War II, as the Brazilian government vetted public demonstrations of the culture of Axis powers countries, and the Japanese colony was still the biggest baseball market. Afterwards, a São Paulo confederation was founded in 1946, and in the 1960s and 1970s Japanese companies with Brazilian operations funded visits of the baseball national teams of traditional countries such as the United States, Japan and Panama. Baseball is still mostly restricted to Japanese Brazilians, some of whom wound up playing on Nippon Professional Baseball or the Japanese minor leagues. As of 2024, the Japanese government funds coaches for semi-pro baseball leagues in Brazil.

Yan Gomes, drafted by the Toronto Blue Jays in 2009, became in 2012 the first Brazilian-born player in the MLB. The Blue Jays had previously signed two Brazilians on their minor league affiliates, José Pett and Jo Matumoto.

The Brazilian governing body of baseball is the Confederação Brasileira de Beisebol e Softbol, founded in 1990.

=== Venezuela ===
Baseball was introduced in Venezuela at the end of the 1910s and at the beginning of the 1920s by American immigrants and workers from the exploding oil industry. Baseball's definitive explosion in Venezuela was in 1941, following the Amateur World Series in Havana when the national team beat Cuba in the finals. This team was consecrated by the press and the fans as "Los Héroes del '41" (The Heroes of '41).

The game was played in an amateur and disorganized form until December 27, 1945, when the owners of the Caracas Brewers (present day Caracas Lions or Leones del Caracas), Vargas, the Magallanes Navigators (Navegantes del Magallanes), and Venezuela created the Venezuelan Professional Baseball League.

On January 12, 1946, the first champion was crowned, Sabios del Vargas. In 1962, the La Guaira Sharks (Tiburones de La Guaira) are brought into the league to replace Pampero. In 1964, the league added two more teams, the Lara Cardinals (Cardenales de Lara) and the Aragua Tigers (Tigres de Aragua). In 1969, the Zulia Eagles (Águilas del Zulia) are brought into the league to replace the Valencia Industrymen (Industriales de Valencia); the original Venezuela team. In 1991, the league expanded to 8 teams from 6, with the additions of the Eastern Caribbeans (Caribes de Oriente) who are now the Anzoátegui Caribbeans or (Caribes de Anzoátegui); and the Cabimas Oil Tankers, who became the Llanos Shepherds (Pastora de los Llanos) and since the 2007/08 season are the Margarita Braves (Bravos de Margarita).

For the 2007–2008 seasons, the West Division (Division Occidental) and the East Division (Division Oriental) were merged in one single division of 8 teams. Each team plays 9 games against the other 7 teams, for a total of 63 games. In recent years, Tigres de Aragua has become the most dominant team of the league, winning the crown 4 times in 5 years. Leones del Caracas is the most successful Venezuelan team, champion of the league 19 times (3 times as "Cervecería Caracas") and champion of the Caribbean Series 2 times.

== See also ==
- List of organized baseball leagues
- International Baseball Awards
- Baseball at the Summer Olympics
