= Baseball in Israel =

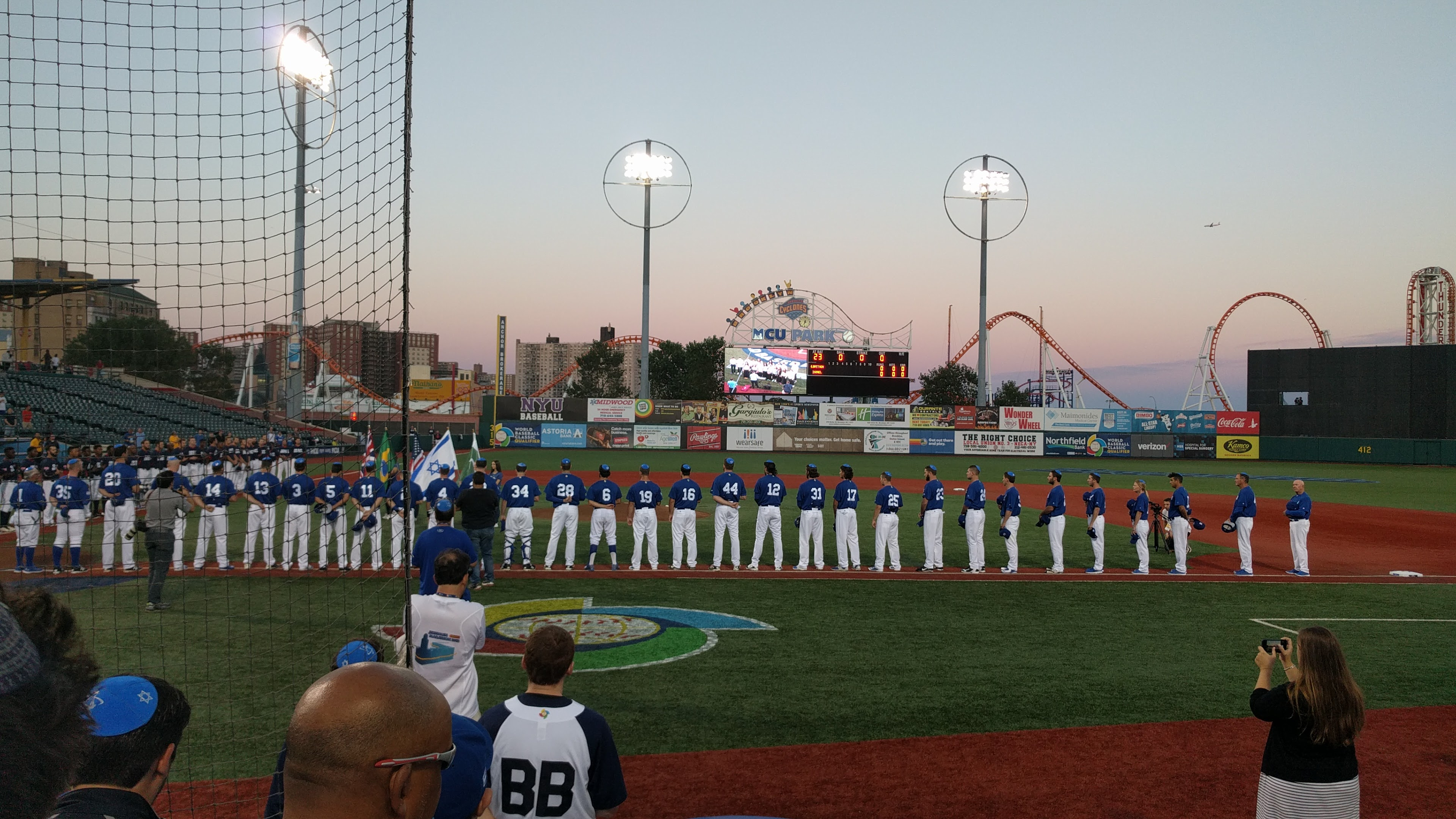
- Team Israel wearing their kippot during Hatikvah before a game against Great Britain in 2016
- Country: Israel
- Governing body: Israel Association of Baseball
- National team: Men's national team
- First played: 1927, in Mandatory Palestine

Club competitions
- Israel Baseball League (defunct)

International competitions
- World Baseball Classic; European Baseball Championship; Summer Olympics

In Israel, there are approximately 1,000 baseball players in 16 cities across the country. Volunteer coaches and donors are instrumental to the growth and development of the sport, as baseball resources are very low. The Israel Association of Baseball (IAB) is the governing body of the sport. As of the end of 2023, Israel was ranked 19th in the world in the sport. The country was one of six nations to qualify for baseball at the 2020 Summer Olympics, finishing fifth in the tournament.

== History ==
Baseball was first played in the British Mandate of Palestine on July 4, 1927. The first field in Israel was built in Kibbutz Gezer in 1979, and the country now has a baseball field at the Yarkon Sports Complex in Petach Tikva. Israel sends national teams of various age groups to international baseball tournaments each year. The best recent showing to date in International Play (Pool A) was a 1st place by the Israeli Juvenile (ages 10–12) in the 2009 European Championships (CEB). Between 500 and 1,000 Israelis regularly play baseball in amateur league play. Baseball is growing at an accelerated pace, with much greater baseball identity associated with the country.

Dean Kremer was the first Israeli to be selected in the Major League Baseball draft (MLB draft), when he was selected by the San Diego Padres in the 2015 MLB draft. However, he opted to play college baseball for the UNLV Rebels, with whom he had three years of remaining eligibility, with the plan of playing professionally after college. In the 2016 MLB draft, Kremer was picked in the 14th round by the Los Angeles Dodgers, 431st overall. His was signed by the Dodgers organization, and made his professional debut that season with the Ogden Raptors of the Pioneer Baseball League. Kremer made his MLB debut in 2020 with the Baltimore Orioles.

=== Ballparks ===
There are three main ballparks in Israel:

- Yarkon Sports Complex, in the Baptist Village in Petach Tikva, just outside Tel Aviv.
- Gezer Field, about halfway between Jerusalem and Tel Aviv.
- Sportek Baseball Field, in Tel Aviv.

In January 2017, the roster of Team Israel traveled to Beit Shemesh to participate in the ground-breaking ceremony for the first-ever dedicated baseball field in Israel. The field was expected to take approximately 2–3 months to design, and be available for use by the end of 2017.

== Organization ==
=== Israel Association of Baseball ===
The Israel Association of Baseball (IAB), established in 1986, founded by Randy Kahn, is a non-profit organization in Israel. Their goal is to promote and develop baseball in Israel. In order to accomplish this they teach baseball to youth, organize national tournaments as well as aid in assisting Israeli teams to compete internationally, and procuring the required equipment. Additionally they will help organize the league, ensure they have a proper field, train the coaches, umpires and player.

The IAB is a member of The Olympic Committee of Israel, the Confederation of European Baseball, and the International Baseball Association. The above organization in addition to the Israel Sports Authority, recognizes the IAB as the sole governing body for baseball in Israel.

Notable players to play in the IAB include Alon Leichman and Dean Kremer.

The following clubs are registered to participate in the IAB; these are mostly youth clubs (Senior teams have a star next to their name:)

- Bet Shemesh Blue Sox
- Bet Shemesh Comets
- Bet Shemesh Mavericks
- Gezer Bats
- Ginot Shomron Hawks
- Hashmonaim Aztec Flames
- Jerusalem Lions*
- Lev Hasharon Nationals
- Modiin Miracles*
- Ra'anana Raiders*
- Rehovot Raptors
- Tel Aviv Comrades*
- Zofit Warriors

=== Israel Baseball Academy ===
Under the authority of the IAB the Israel Baseball Academy launched in October 2014. The first year's program started in mid-October at Yarkon Sports Complex in Petah Tikva.

Academy players will partake in weekly training. This will give them the opportunities to play in the Israel National Team Program, to be recognized as Elite Athletes in the IDF. The program is also recognized by Major League Baseball and will give them access to programs designed for the best young players in Europe.

Former IAB National Director Nate Fish and National Team Coach David Schenker were the first coaches for the academy. Dan Rothem, a former college pitcher and Israel National Team player will be the pitching coach. Each year the program plans to include 10 kids age 14-21. In addition to the first year's participants there are 20 kids which are being scouted for year two.

There are currently 24 players aged 14–18 in the Israel Baseball Academy. National Coach, Ryan Willen, a former catcher at division 3 Washington & Jefferson College runs the Academy. Additionally, former Japanese professional coach and player by the nickname of "KAZ" assists in operating and maintaining the high-level product offered to the nations best players.

=== Israel Baseball League ===
In 2007, the Israel Baseball League played its one and only season. The six league teams were the Tel Aviv Lightning, Netanya Tigers, Bet Shemesh Blue Sox, Petach Tikva Pioneers, Modi'in Miracle, and Ra'anana Express. All the league's games were played at three ballparks. The Yarkon Sports Complex, Gezer Field, and Sportek Baseball Field.

In November 2007 it was announced that a new six-team league, the Israel Professional Baseball League, was taking shape, and would play its first season in 2008. Those behind the new league included billionaire Jeffrey Rosen, a major IBL investor who also owns the Maccabi Haifa basketball team, which he bought in the summer of 2007, and is the chairman of Triangle Financial Services of Aventura, Florida; Andrew Wilson, who was a facilitator on the ground for the IBL and now works for Rosen; Alan Gardner, a lawyer from New York, who was the centerfielder for the Bet Shemesh Blue Sox; and Michael Rollhaus, a businessman from Queens and major IBL investor.

== World Baseball Classic ==
=== 2013 Tournament ===
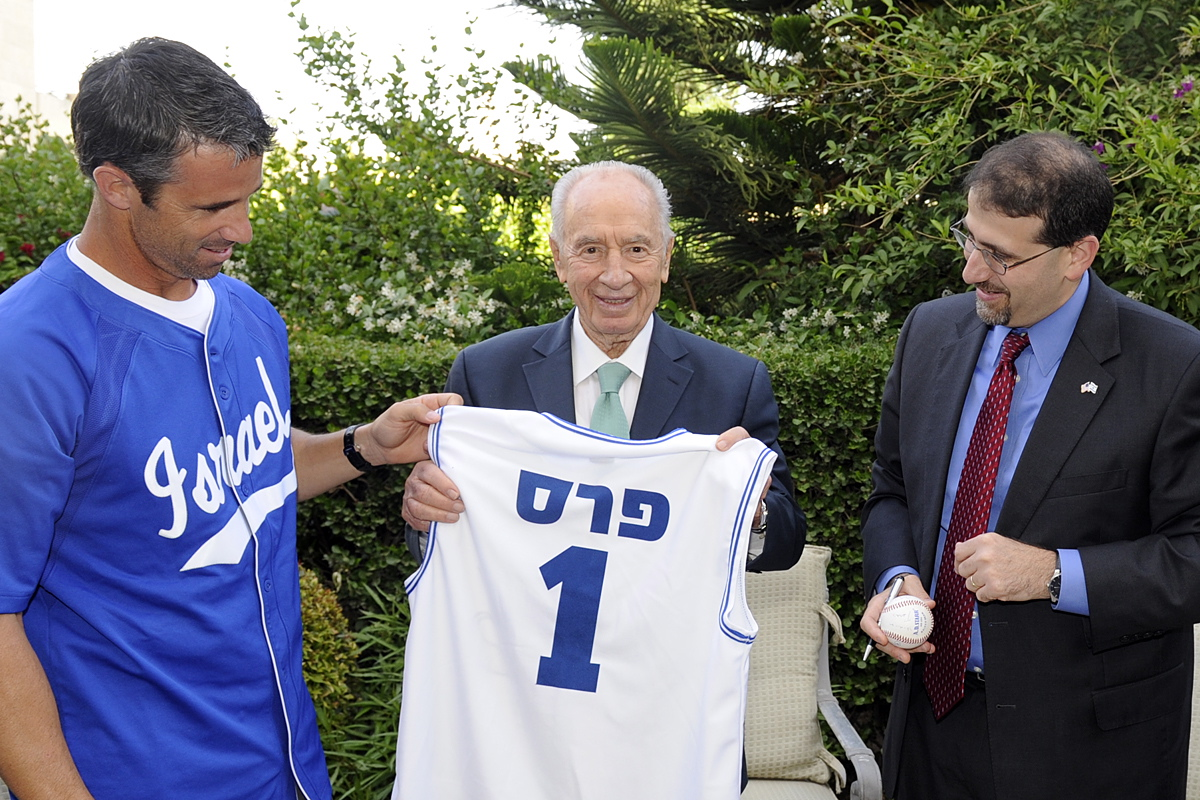
Israel national baseball team manager Brad Ausmus, Israeli president Shimon Peres and U.S. ambassador Daniel B. Shapiro (l-r)

Israel, was placed in the Qualifier 1 bracket with Spain, South Africa and France.

Israel competed in their first qualifying match for the 2013 tournament on 19 September 2012. In this game they defeated South Africa by a score of 7–3. Nate Freiman had two home runs in the victory.

Israel's second qualifying match was against Spain on 21 September 2012. Israel won the game by a score of 4-2. Nate Freiman once again homered twice for Israel in the victory.

Israel's third qualifying match was once again against Spain on 23 September 2012. Israel lost this game by a score of 9-7 in 10 innings. With the victory Israel was eliminated from the tournament and Spain moved on to the next round. Although Israel had won their first two games they were eliminated due to the tournaments modified double-elimination format. This meant that the final game was winner-take-all.

=== 2017 Tournament ===
In September 2016, Israel competed in the 2017 Qualifier 4 round. Colorado Rockies coach Jerry Weinstein served as the manager. Israel's roster included 20 MLB-affiliated minor leaguers, making up 86% of the team, more than any other team in the qualifiers even before including recent Major Leaguers.

Israel won all three of their games in the qualifier, beating Great Britain twice and Brazil once. With the win, Israel will play in Pool A in South Korea in March 2017, against South Korea, Taiwan, and Netherlands. In the first round, Israel again swept the round, to advance to the second round in Pool E. Israel finished third in the second round with a 1-2 record, and did not advance.

=== 2023 Tournament ===
Team Israel competed in the 2023 World Baseball Classic in March 12-15, 2023 in Miami, Florida. Israel faced Team Puerto Rico, Team Dominican Republic, Team Venezuela, and Team Nicaragua in Pool D and finished fourth, qualifying for the 2026 World Baseball Classic.

== European Baseball Championship ==
Team Israel first competed in the European Baseball Championship in 2019; their best finish has been second place, achieved in 2021.

=== 2019 Tournament ===
Team Israel won the 2019 European Baseball Championship - B-Pool in early July 2019 in Blagoevgrad, Bulgaria, winning all five of its games. It thus advanced to the playoffs against Team Lithuania in the 2019 Playoff Series at the end of July 2019 for the last qualifying spot for the 2019 European Baseball Championship. Israel won the best-of-three playoff series 2–0, and thereby qualified for the main tournament.

In Round 1 of the 2019 European Baseball Championship, Israel went 4–1. The team thereby advanced to the Championship's eight-team playoffs. In the Championship playoffs, Israel defeated Team France in the quarterfinals, lost to Team Italy in the semi-finals, and finished in fourth place for the tournament.

=== 2021 Tournament ===
Team Israel was runner-up of the 2021 European Baseball Championship, losing 9–4 in the championship game to Team Netherlands.

=== 2023 Tournament ===
Team Israel finished in sixth place of the 2023 European Baseball Championship, having played to a 3–3 record during the tournament.

== Summer Olympics ==
=== 2020 Olympics qualifiers Africa/Europe Qualifying Event ===
The Israeli team started strong at the September 2019 Africa/Europe Qualifying Event, by defeating all three 2019 European Baseball Championship medalists - world # 8 Netherlands, world # 16 Italy, and Spain, before losing to the Czech Republic. In its final game, Israel beat South Africa 11–1 in a game that was stopped in the 7th inning due to the mercy rule. Team Israel won the tournament with a 4–1 record. It thereby qualified to be one of six national baseball teams that competed in the 2020 Summer Olympics in Tokyo. First baseman/DH Danny Valencia batted .375 and led the tournament in runs (7), home runs (3), RBIs (9), walks (5), and slugging percentage (1.000), and starting pitcher Joey Wagman tied for the tournament lead with two wins, and led in complete games (1) and strikeouts (14) as he had an 0.56 ERA in 16 innings.

Only four members of the 24-member team at the 2020 Olympics were born in Israel. The others made aliyah to Israel under the Law of Return, which gives anyone with a Jewish parent or grandparent or who is married to a Jew the right to return to Israel and be granted Israeli citizenship. Native-born Israeli team member Shlomo Lipetz observed:

"There is no other country like Israel that carries an identity as it does with Jews around the world. We’re not the only team here with citizens that don't live in the country. There were other teams like Spain that had 22 Venezuelans and two Spaniards. But they didn't have that connection. This wasn't just a group of people, All-Stars who came together. It was people who all had a Bar Mitzvah. We were joking around that everyone will post their Bar Mitzvah photo."

Pos	Team	Pld	W	L	RF	RA	RD	GB	Qualification
1	Israel	5	4	1	34	11	+23	—	Qualification to 2020 Summer Olympics
2	Netherlands	5	4	1	26	15	+11	—	Qualification to Final Qualifying Tournament
3	Czech Republic	5	3	2	26	17	+9	1	
4	Spain	5	2	3	16	19	−3	2	
5	Italy	5	2	3	23	25	−2	2	
6	South Africa	5	0	5	8	46	−38	4	

Source: WBSC

=== 2020 Summer Olympics ===
At the 2020 Summer Olympics, held in Tokyo in the summer of 2021, Israel beat Mexico and finished fifth after going 1–4 and losing to the Dominican Republic 7–6 in the Round 2 Repechage. Danny Valencia tied for the lead in the Olympics with three home runs, tied for second with six runs and seven RBIs, and had the fourth-best slugging percentage (.778), Ryan Lavarnway had the 5th-best slugging percentage (.700), and Mitch Glasser's .474 on base percentage was 5th-best at the Games.

== See also ==
- Baseball awards § Israel
- Sport in Israel
  - American football in Israel
  - Basketball in Israel
  - Ice hockey in Israel
