= Daniel Maddy-Weitzman =

Israeli baseball player (born 1986)

Ra'anana Express – No. 25
- Pitcher
- Born: November 14, 1986 (age 38)
- Bats: Right Throws: Right

Teams
- Ra'anana Express (2007)

Daniel Maddy-Weitzman (born 14 November 1986, in Tel Aviv, Israel) is an Israeli baseball player. He is among the few players who were born in Israel and played at the NCAA level.

== Playing career ==
=== College ===
Maddy-Weitzman graduated from Haverford College in Pennsylvania in 2012, where he played on the varsity D3 baseball team for 4 years.

=== Israel Baseball League ===
Maddy-Weitzman began his career with the Ra'anana Express and is a product of the Israel Association of Baseball farm system. He played for the Ra'anana Express in the 2007 Israel Baseball League season as a pitcher and outfielder, and threw a 7 inning CG win against Netanya Tigers to end the regular season.

=== Minor League Baseball ===
During the 2015 season, Maddy-Weitzman played for the Downtown Bulls in the New York City Metro Baseball League and batted .304 with 21 RBIs and 22 SB in 19 games. Maddy-Weitzman was chosen to the all-star game.

=== Team Israel ===
He was chosen several times to accompany the Israel national baseball and softballs teams to international tournaments in Europe and the United States.

Maddy-Weitzman competed for Israel during the qualifier for the 2010 European Baseball Championship. During the opening game, against Bulgaria, Maddy-Weitzman started in right field and batted 5th, going 0 for 4 with 4 strike outs, and got a RBI on a sacrifice fly. During the second game, against Croatia, he once against started in right field, and batted 7th, going 0 for 3 with 3 strike outs before being pinch hit for by Dan Rothem. During the third game, against Serbia, he did not start, however he entered the game in the 8th inning as a defensive replacement in right field, and went 0 for 1. During the fourth and final game, against Lithuania, he got the start in right field, going 0 for 4 with a strike out, and finished the qualifier with a .000 batting average.
