= Yarkon =

Yarkon (or Yarqon) may refer to:

- Yarkon River, in Israel
- Yarkon Cemetery, in Petah Tikva, the main cemetery for the Tel Aviv, Israel, area
- Yarkon Park, an urban park in Tel Aviv
- Yarkon Sports Complex, a sports complex in the Baptist Village in Petah Tikva
- HaYarkon Street, a street in Tel Aviv
- Yarkona, a moshav in central Israel
- "Yarkon", a Unit 8200 (Israeli Intelligence) base near Urim, Israel
