= Petach =

Petach may refer to:

- 23011 Petach, a main-belt asteroid, named after Intel Science Talent Search finalist Helen Petach
- Petah Tikva Pioneers, an Israeli baseball team
- Petah Tikva (unofficial name: Petach Tikvah), a city in Israel
- Hapoel Petah Tikva F.C., an Israeli football club
