= Mendavia =

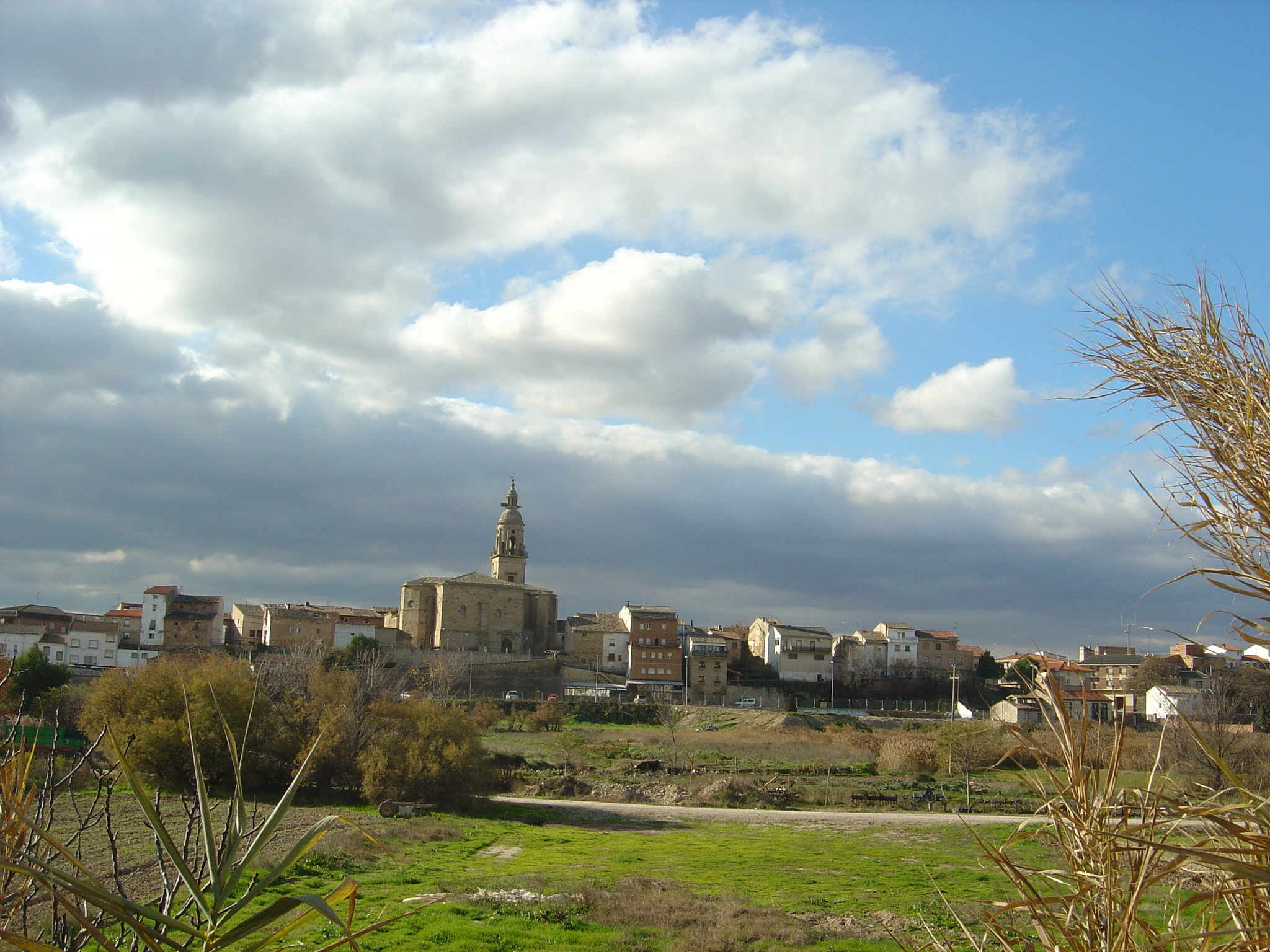

- Coat of arms
- Interactive map of Mendavia
- Coordinates: 42°27′N 2°12′W
- Country: Spain
- Autonomous Community: Navarre

Area
  - Total: 78 km^{2} (30 sq mi)
- Elevation: 360 m (1,180 ft)

Population (2025-01-01)
  - Total: 3,588
  - Density: 46/km^{2} (120/sq mi)
- Time zone: UTC+1 (CET)
  - Summer (DST): UTC+2 (CEST)

Mendavia (Basque: Mendabia) is a town and municipality located in the province and autonomous community of Navarre, northern Spain. The Postal code is 31587.

Mendavia is an agricultural town. It produces high-quality asparagus, peaches and a certain variety of large red pepper.

Roque Romero Sainz (died 1997), active promoter of baseball in Spain between 1940 and 1970, was born in Mendavia in 1910. He was the founder of one of the rare baseball clubs in Spain, Pops CB, and became chairman of the Catalan Baseball Federation for a while.

== Local celebrations ==
- August 23–30, San Juan Bautista.
- January 16, San Antón.
