= Pops CB =

Spanish baseball club

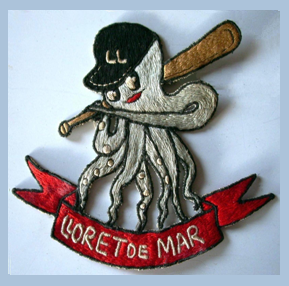
The badge of the Pops baseball club, an octopus holding a bat.

Pops Club de Béisbol (from the Catalan word for "octopuses") was a Catalan Spanish baseball club in Lloret de Mar, Catalonia, where there were many descendants of immigrants from Cuba.

Its founders were Nasi Brugueras and Alex Colomer from Barcelona, and its sponsor and president was Roque Romero, a stockbroker born in Mendavia, Navarre. Roque Romero remained as president of the Pops club until its demise and for a while also became chairman of the Catalan Baseball Federation. This now defunct baseball club was active during the heyday of baseball in Spain in the 1950s and 1960s. But owing to mass-interest in football, Pops baseball club did not survive into the 1970s and its field was converted into a field for the local football team.

Pops won the local Campionat de Catalunya (Catalan Championship) in 1955.

== See also ==
- History of baseball outside the United States
- Baseball in Cuba
