= Dan Rothem =

Israeli baseball player (born 1976)

Israel National Team – No. 32
- Pitcher
- Born: December 3, 1976 (age 49); Tel Aviv, Israel
- Bats: Right Throws: Right

Dan Rothem (Hebrew: דן רותם; born December 3, 1976) is an Israeli baseball player.

== Player ==
=== Israel Baseball League ===
Rothem played for the Tel Aviv Lightning during the 2007 Israel Baseball League season. Following the first and only season of the Israel baseball league, Rothem won the MVP award.

=== World Baseball Classic ===
Rothem has represented Israel national baseball team in international tournaments. Rothem was on the roster for Israel at the World Baseball Classic during the 2013 qualifier, however he did not enter a game. Rothem along with Shlomo Lipetz and Alon Leichman were the only three players on the team to hold Israeli citizenship.

=== European Baseball Championship ===
Rothem represented Israel during the qualifying round of the 2010 European Baseball Championship. During the opening game against Bulgaria, Rothem was the starting pitcher and went 6.2 innings, while giving up 4 hits, no runs, while recording 1 walk and 3 strikeouts. Rothem did not start the second game, against Croatia, but entered in the 9th inning as a pitch hitter for Daniel Maddy-Weitzman and struck out swinging. During the third game, against Serbia, Rothem was once again the starting pitcher, lasting 5 innings while giving up 1 run on 5 hits, 1 walk and struck out 7. During the fourth and final game of the qualifier, against Lithuania, Rothem entered the game as a defensive replacement as catcher in the 2nd inning, and went 4 for 4.

Rothem competed for Israel during the qualifying round of the 2012 European Baseball Championship. During the opening game of the qualifier, Rothem started as short stop batting fifth and went 0 for 2 with three walks, an RBI and stole a base. During the second game against Great Britain, Rothem again started at short stop and batted sixth, going 1 for 4 with a walk and getting an RBI with a strike out. During the third game against Lithuania, Rothem was the starting pitcher and threw a compete game (8 innings due to the (mercy rule), while giving up 6 hits, 2 earned runs, with 2 walks and 7 strikeouts. During the first game of the finals, Rothem was the starting short stop and went 0 for 5 with an RBI and a strike out. During the second game of the home/away finals, Rothem was the starting short stop and batted fifth, going 0 for 2 with 2 walks.

Rothem also represented Israel during the 2016 qualifier for Israel at the European Baseball Championship, for the C-Level qualifier in 2014. Rothem was the starting third baseman and went 1 for 4 while scoring a run and striking out once. Rothem again started the second game against Slovenia, where he went 2 for 2 with a double, 2 walks and scored twice. Although Rothem started the third game at third base, against Latvia, he did not bat and committed a fielding error. The fourth game of the tournament, the semifinals game, Rothem started as the designated hitter, going 1 for 4 with a strike out and an RBI, before becoming a relief pitcher in the 9th inning, replacing Dean Kremer, giving up 2 earned runs on 2 hits and striking out 1, during his 1 inning. Israel's fifth and final game was once again against Slovenia, in the C-Level finals, and Rothem started at third, going 2 for 2 with 2 walks and 2 runs scored.

After winning the C-Level qualifier, Israel qualified for the B-Level qualifier in 2015, in which Rothem once again played for Israel. During the first game against Belarus, Rother was the starting third baseman, going 2 for 3 with 3 walks, an RBI and a run scored. During the second game against Poland, Rothem started at third but was hitless in four at bats with a strike out. Rothem was the designated hitter against Austria in the third game, and went 1 for 5 with a walk and a strike out. Rothem took the loss as the starting pitcher in the fourth game, against Lithuania, lasting 7 innings giving up 4 hits, 3 earned runs, walked 3 and struck out 4. During Israel's fifth and final game they faced Sweden, in which Rothem was the designated hitter, and went 0 for 3 with a hit by a pitch.

== Coach ==
Rothem is currently the Pitching Coach for the Israel Baseball Academy, a training program to prepare top athletes for competitive baseball in the USA and Europe.
