= Shlomo Lipetz =

Israeli baseball player (born 1979)

Shlomo Lipetz שלמה ליפיץ

Israel national baseball team
- Pitcher
- Born: February 11, 1979 (age 47); Tel Aviv, Israel
- Bats: Right Throws: Right
- Stats at Baseball Reference
Medals
Men's baseball
Representing Israel
European Baseball Championship
Silver medal – second place	2021 Israel	Team

Shlomo Lipetz (Hebrew: שלמה ליפץ; born February 11, 1979) is an Israeli baseball player who pitches for Team Israel. He is also Vice President of Programming and music director at City Winery in New York City.

He was on the Israel national team for Israel at the 2017 World Baseball Classic. He also pitched for the team at the Africa/Europe 2020 Olympic Qualification tournament in Italy in September 2019, which Israel won to qualify to play baseball at the 2020 Summer Olympics. He pitched for Team Israel at the 2020 Summer Olympics in Tokyo in the summer of 2021. Lipetz pitched for Team Israel in the 2023 World Baseball Classic.

== Early and personal life ==
Lipetz was born and raised in Tel Aviv, Israel. His parents, Aharon and Debra Lipetz, are graduates of New York University. Lipetz has a brother, Gaby. He now lives in Brooklyn, New York.

== Baseball ==
=== Early years, college, and Israel Baseball League ===
Lipetz started playing baseball at an early age, having gotten hooked on the game in 1986 on a trip to New York in which he saw the New York Mets play. At age 10 he represented Israel at the Little League World Series preliminaries at the Ramstein Air Force Base in Germany. He attended Ironi High School in Tel Aviv, Israel. There, he competed in baseball, basketball, soccer, and track.

While serving in the Israel Defense Forces, Lipetz received the "Outstanding Athlete" status allowing him to continue to train and compete while serving in the military.

Following his army service, Lipetz played baseball for San Diego Mesa College for two seasons. He walked on to the team and became the second native-born Israeli to play college baseball in the United States, after pitcher Dan Rothem. While in college, he improved his fastball from 66 mph to 88 mph.

Transferring to the University of California, San Diego (UC San Diego) his junior year on an athletic scholarship, he led the Tritons staff with a 2.84 ERA, and was 5–0 with 3 saves in 24 relief appearances; Lipetz walked just 3 in 38 innings. In 2005, the senior went 2–4 with 7 saves and a 4.42 ERA as UCSD's closer.

Following college, Lipetz continued his baseball career in New York in semipro leagues. He also played a short pro season in Mexico, and as a semi-pro in the independent Pedrin Zorrilla Baseball League in Brooklyn.

He played for the Netanya Tigers in the 2007 Israel Baseball League season. Lipetz led the league with a 0.98 ERA, while recording 30 strikeouts, and walking only three.

=== European Baseball Championship ===
In the 2010 European Baseball Championship qualifiers, in 2008, Lipetz led Team Israel in wins going 2–0 with a 2.63 ERA. Lipetz did not play during the first game, against Bulgaria. During the second game, Lipetz allowed three runs in a relief inning against Croatia. In the third game, against Serbia, Lipetz threw 2.2 innings in relief, giving up 1 earned run on 6 hits. During the fourth and final game, against Lithuania, Lipetz tossed a 10-inning, 4-hit complete game to beat Lithuania 2–1. He led that qualifier in victories and tied for second in strikeouts.

During the 2012 European Baseball Championship qualifiers, in 2011, Lipetz pitched in 3 of the 5 games. Lipetz beat Georgia in the opener pitching 7 innings and striking out 9. Lipetz did not appear in the second game, against Great Britain, or in the third game against Lithuania. During the first game of the home/away finals against Great Britain, Lipetz pitched a complete game shutout, giving up 6 hits and 3 walks while striking out fives. Later that same day, Lipetz started again, pitching an additional 4.1 innings, giving up one earned run on 6 hits, while recording 4 strikeouts. He threw a total of 214 pitches in the doubleheader.

Lipetz started once during the 2016 European Baseball Championship C-Level qualifier in 2014, shutting out Slovenia while striking out 10.

He again pitched for Israel in 2015 as part of the B-Level qualifier, for the 2016 European Baseball Championship. Lipetz did not appear in the opening game of the qualifier against Belarus. During the second game, against Poland, Lipetz pitched one inning of relief, allowing two runners on via hit by pitch, and allowed an unearned run on a balk, however was still credited with the win. Lipetz threw a complete game against Austria giving up 1 run on 5 hits and striking out 8. Lipetz did not appear in the fourth game, against Lituania. Lipetz relieved Dean Kremer in the final game, against Sweden, with a 5–3 lead, two on and one out in the 8th and was able to retire the side while giving up 1 run, and gave up an additional 5 runs to make the score 9–5, ending the qualifier with a 2–1 record.

He pitched for Team Israel at the 2019 European Baseball Championship.

Lipetz pitched for Team Israel in the 2023 European Baseball Championship in September 2023 in the Czech Republic, and was 0–0 with a 3.38 ERA.

=== World Baseball Classic ===
Lipetz was one of three Israelis to play for the Israel national baseball team during the 2013 World Baseball Classic qualifiers, with Dan Rothem and Alon Leichman, however Lipetz was the only one to see playing time. He appeared in one game, relieving David Kopp with a 7–0 lead in the 9th versus South Africa, Lipetz recorded only 1 out giving up 2 runs on 3 walks, giving Lipetz a 54.00 ERA.

Lipetz was again on Israel's roster for the 2017 World Baseball Classic qualifiers, as the only native Israeli on the team, with Dean Kremer as the only other player holding Israeli citizenship. He did not pitch in the qualifier, as Israel qualified for a spot in the main tournament.

Lipetz was on Team Israel at the 2017 World Baseball Classic main tournament in March 2017.

Lipetz pitched for Team Israel in the 2023 World Baseball Classic. He played for Team Israel manager Ian Kinsler, and alongside two-time All Star outfielder Joc Pederson, starting pitcher Dean Kremer, and others.

=== Africa/Europe 2020 Olympic Qualification tournament ===
Lipetz also pitched for the team at the Africa/Europe 2020 Olympic Qualification tournament in Italy in September 2019, which Israel won to qualify to play baseball at the 2020 Summer Olympics in Tokyo. In the tournament he was 0–0 with a 0.00 ERA over 0.1 innings, securing the last out of the tournament for Team Israel. Commenting on the team's reaction to the realization that they will be competing at the 2020 Olympics, he said: “We all have goosebumps.”

=== 2020 Olympics ===
He pitched for Team Israel in two games in relief at the 2020 Summer Olympics in Tokyo in the summer of 2021.

== Music director ==
Lipetz works at City Winery in Soho in New York City, where he serves as the President of Venues, and previously as VP of Programming, across all City Winery locations. Lipetz began working at City Winery in 2008 with its founding.

== See also ==
- List of select Jewish baseball players
