= Ra'anana Express =

- רעננה אקספרס
- Logo

Information
- League: Israel Baseball League
- Location: (Israel) Ra'anana
- Ballpark: Yarkon Sports Complex
- Founded: 2007
- League championships: 0
- Colors: Green and yellow
- Manager: (Australia) Shaun Smith

Current uniforms
Home

The Ra'anana Express (Hebrew: רעננה אקספרס) was an Israeli baseball team from Ra'anana in the now-defunct Israel Baseball League.

The Express finished the inaugural 2007 season in fifth place, 17-24 (.415), and lost to the Netanya Tigers in the semifinals of the 2007 championship.

== History ==

In 2007 the team was managed by Australian Shaun Smith.

The first player selected by the Express in the inaugural 2007 draft was Australian pitcher John Thew. The team's first game was played against the Tel Aviv Lightning on June 24, 2007, at the Sportek in Tel Aviv.

Starting pitcher Esequier Pie, from San Pedro de Macorís in the Dominican Republic, threw two no-hitters in the 2007 season.

== Stadium ==
Located in the Baptist Village in Petah Tikva, the Yarkon Sports Complex is home to the Express as well as the Petach Tikva Pioneers and the Israeli national baseball team.

== 2007 roster ==
Ra'anana Express roster
Active (25-man) roster		Coaches/Other
Starting rotation: 36 (Dominican Republic) Esequier Pie; 3 (United States) Nat Ballenberg; 25 (Israel) Daniel Maddy-Weitzman; 23 (United States) Nathan Mittag; 20 (Australia) John Thew; 4 (Colombia) Max Vazquez; 30 (United States) Travis Zier; 7 (United States) Joshua Zumbrun; Bullpen: Currently unknown; † 15-day disabled list Roster updated 28.06.2007; Transactions	Catchers: 9 (Israel) Mike Hochman; 8 (United States) Jesse Michel; 16 (Dominican Republic) Juan Ramirez; Infielders: 11 (United States) Matt Block; 10 (United States) Scott Feller; 1 (United States) Ben Katz-Moses; 6 (United States) Donnie Mott; 5 (Israel) Guy Peled; 14 (United States) Brendan Rubenstein; Outfielders: 12 (United States) Matt Castillo; 18 (United States) Ben Field; 2 (United States) John Toussas; 21 (United States) Stephen Raab; Designated hitters: Currently unknown	Manager: - (Australia) Shaun Smith; Coaches: - (Australia) Leo Vargas; Suspended list: Currently vacant
