= Yarkon Sports Complex =

Sports facility in Petah Tikva

Coordinates: 32°6′47.93″N 34°54′45.7″E

The Yarkon Sports Complex, is located in the Baptist Village in Petah Tikva, just outside Tel Aviv. The field was used in the 2007 season of the Israel Baseball League. During this season, both the Petah Tikva Pioneers and the Ra'anana Express called this field home.

The Yarkon Sports Complex is surrounded by the Baptist Chapel and cottages. The large parking lot made it highly popular as suitable for tailgate parties. The stadium was also very popular due to its proximity to bus and train stations. The seating was a mix of stadium bleachers and picnic tables.
