= Petah Tikva Pioneers =

Professional baseball team in Israel

- פתח תקווה פיונירס

Information
- League: Israel Baseball League
- Location: (Israel) Petah Tikva
- Ballpark: Yarkon Sports Complex
- Founded: 2006
- League championships: 0
- Colors: Red and Black

Current uniforms
| Home | Away |

The petah Tikva Pioneers (Hebrew: פתח תקווה פיונירס) was an Israeli baseball team from Petah Tikva in the Israel Baseball League.

They finished the inaugural 2007 regular season in last place (9-32; .220), and lost to the Modi'in Miracle in the quarterfinals of the 2007 championship.

== History ==

The name for the Pioneers was chosen in recognition that Petah Tikva was founded in 1878 by religious pioneers from Jerusalem, who were led by Yehoshua Stampfer, Yoel Moshe Salomon, Zerach Brant, and David Gutmann, as well as Lithuanian Rabbi Aryeh Leib Frumkin.

The first player selected by the Pioneers in the inaugural draft was Dominican outfielder Reynaldo Cruz, who later suffered a concussion and did not play for the rest of the season.

Ken Holtzman managed the Pioneers in the 2007 inaugural season of the Israel Baseball League, up until the last week of the season. Holtzman in his major league career was the only pitcher since the 1880s to throw 2 no-hitters for the Cubs, and his 174 career victories are the most in the major leagues by a Jewish pitcher. He also held the record for most pitching appearances by a Jewish pitcher until 1998.

== Stadium ==
Located at the Yarkon Sports Complex in petah Tikva.

== 2007 roster ==
petah Tikva Pioneers roster
| Active (25-man) roster | | Coaches/Other |
| Starting rotation: 24 (United States) Ari Alexenberg; 8 (Canada) Ryan Butkowsky; 18 (United States) Scott Cantor; 6 (Israel) George Chityat; 22 (United States) Josh Epstein; 4 (Canada) Andrew Morales; 21 (United States) Alper Ulutas; 20 (Dominican Republic) Abel Moreno; Bullpen: Currently unknown; † 15-day disabled list Roster updated 03.08.2007; Transactions | Catchers: 7 (United States) Kevin Brill; 10 (Australia) Michael Olson; 15 (Canada) Dustin Melanson; Infielders: 2 (United States) Adam Goldman; 5 (United States) Seth Binder; 11 (United States) Dovid Green; 16 (United States) Willis Bumphus; 26 (Canada) Ryan Crotin; 36 (Israel) Shuki Friedman; Outfielders: 3 (United States) Aaron Rosdal; 9 (United States) Ben Dashefsky; 12 (Israel) Omri Modiano; 17 (Dominican Republic) Reynaldo Cruz; Designated hitters: Currently unknown | Manager: 30 (United States) Ken Holtzman; Coaches: 18 (United States) Scott Cantor; 24 (United States) Ari Alexenberg; Suspended list: Currently vacant |
