= Jews in baseball =

Jews have been involved in baseball since the sport's beginnings in the mid-19th century and have contributed to its evolution in many capacities, including players, agents, team owners, executives, umpires, broadcasters, and fans. In the United States, particularly, baseball played a large part in the assimilation of American Jews into American society at a time of rampant antisemitism and when Jews were immigrating to America to escape persecution. Today, it remains a very important part in Jewish American culture.

On the field, Jewish baseball players faced constant antisemitic heckles from opponents and fans, with many hiding their heritage to avoid discrimination in the league. Despite this, a number of Jewish players overcame such abuse and went on to become stars. Two such players, Hank Greenberg and Sandy Koufax, were both elected to the Baseball Hall of Fame and are widely considered to be amongst the most important and iconic players in baseball history. Similarly, off the field, Jews were involved deeply in the evolution of the game with executive Barney Dreyfuss, a Jewish immigrant who responsible for the founding of the World Series, the most prestigious event in baseball, and Marvin Miller who revolutionized the relationship between players and owners by unionizing players and helping usher in the era of free agency.

== Players ==
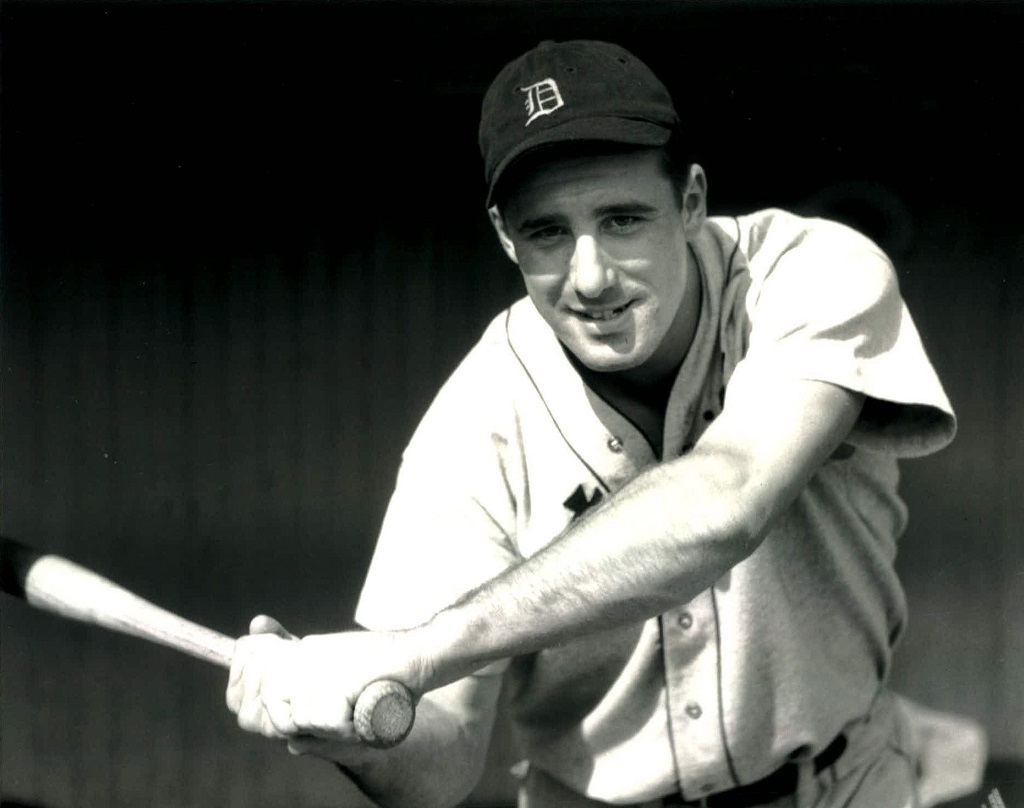
Sandy Koufax and Hank Greenberg, the only Jewish players elected to the Baseball Hall of Fame

Jewish players have played in professional baseball since its beginnings in the mid-19th century. With the surge of Jewish immigrants from Europe to the United States at the turn of the 20th century, baseball, then the most popular sport in the country and referred to as the "National Pastime", became a way for children of Jewish immigrants to assimilate into American life. Sportswriter Jon Wertheim described baseball as being "interwoven with the American Jewish experience". Baseball historian John Thorn described it as an "agent of integration".

The first Jewish baseball star would be Hank Greenberg, the son of Orthodox Romanian-Jewish immigrants, who broke into the Majors with the Detroit Tigers. Throughout his career, Greenberg faced verbal abuse from opposing benches and fans but never hid his Jewish identity.

Late in the 1934 season, Greenberg announced that he would not play on September 10, which was Rosh Hashanah, the Jewish New Year, or on September 19, which was Yom Kippur, the Day of Atonement. The move was not popular with Detroit fans. As a result, Greenberg discussed the matter with his rabbi and his father; finally he relented and agreed to play on Rosh Hashanah. On that day, Greenberg hit two home runs in a 2–1 Tigers victory over the Red Sox. The following day, Detroit Free Press ran the Hebrew lettering for "Happy New Year" across its front page.

However, Greenberg refused to play on Yom Kippur, a decision which was unpopular with the press and fans. However, he later recalled in his autobiography that he received a standing ovation from congregants at Congregation Shaarey Zedek when he arrived. With Greenberg absent from the lineup, the Tigers lost to the Yankees 5–2.

Despite missing more time to military service in World War II than any other major league player, Greenberg would become the first Jewish player elected to the Baseball Hall of Fame when he was elected in 1956, finishing his career as a two-time AL MVP with the Tigers.

Alongside Greenberg, the most famous Jewish baseball player Sandy Koufax of the Los Angeles Dodgers, widely considered to be one of the greatest pitchers in baseball history. Finishing his injury-shortened career as a three-time Cy Young Award winner and two-time World Series MVP, he became the second Jewish player elected to the Hall of Fame. Like Greenberg, Koufax never pitched during the High Holy Days. Most famously, he sat out Game 1 of the 1965 World Series because it fell on Yom Kippur, later saying, "There was no hard decision for me. It was just a thing of respect." He went on to win the World Series MVP Award, pitching two shutouts in Games 5 and 7, the latter on two days' rest, after losing Game 2 despite pitching well.

Rabbi Rebecca Alpert stated that Koufax, who faced antisemitism as well, helped break stereotypes of Jewish men who were seen as being weak and bookish. His decision to sit out a World Series game became one of the most iconic moments for American Jews, making him "an important role model, and a real hero."

Incidentally, both Koufax and Greenberg played important parts in baseball's labor movement. Before the 1966 season, Koufax, who had previous contract disputes with his team's front office, particularly with Dodgers general manager Buzzie Bavasi, played a leading role in the joint holdout with teammate and fellow pitcher Don Drysdale. The team had, in the past, often played the two pitchers against each other during their individual negotiations. For thirty-two days, the pair held out to pressure their team to engage in fairer contract negotiations.

The holdout is considered the "first key event" in the baseball's labor movement which began a decade long change that led to free agency being established in Major League Baseball. After the 32-day holdout ended, Arthur Daley of The New York Times described it as being "baseball's first collective bargaining agreement. There are aspects of unionism to it and no one in this sport of rugged individualists ever was confronted with such a thing before."

Similarly, in during Curt Flood's fight Major League Baseball's reserve clause, Greenberg was one of the former players to testify on behalf of Flood. Recalling how he was treated by his former team before his trade to the Pittsburgh Pirates, he testified that the "reserve clause should be eliminated entirely, thereby creating a new image for baseball". Koufax was also one of the few former star players to publicly express support for Flood's cause: "I have to give Curt the greatest amount of credit for believing in what he's doing. At the salary he's making, that's the kind of money which he's never going to get back."

=== Other notable players ===
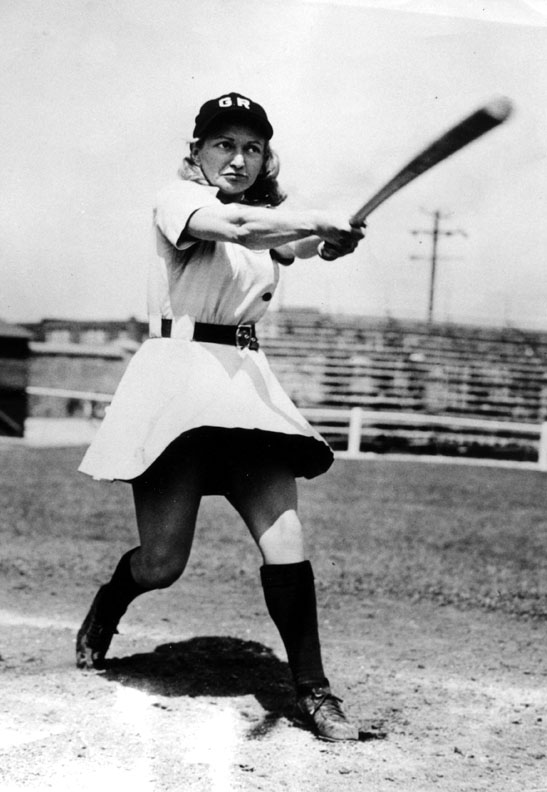
Thelma "Tiby" Eisen, Jewish star in the All-American Girls Professional Baseball League, with the Grand Rapids Chicks

Besides Koufax and Greenberg, other notable Jewish stars in Major League Baseball have been: Harry Danning, Sid Gordon, Al Rosen, Ryan Braun, Ken Holtzman, Shawn Green, and Max Fried. Rosen and Braun are the only other MVP recipients to date, with Rosen being the first unanimous MVP winner in MLB history. Green made headlines in 2001 when he followed the footsteps of Koufax and Greenberg and chose to sit out Yom Kippur despite his team being in a tight divisional race.

The first Jewish baseball player and one of the first professional baseball players was Lipman Pike who played in the 19th century and was amongst the game's first great hitter. Pike briefly held the career record and also led the league in home runs four times.

Another notable player was Moe Berg. Though a solid but undistinguished catcher during his baseball career, Berg was graduate of Princeton University with a degree in modern languages and learned to speak seven languages – one famous line on him being "He can speak seven languages, but he can't hit in any of them." During World War II, Berg served as a spy for the Office of Strategic Services, traveling around Europe to gather information on the German nuclear weapons program. For his service, President Harry Truman awarded Berg the Medal of Freedom.

Despite women being shut out from baseball, Jewish women have also played the game professionally. In the All-American Girls Professional Baseball League (AAGPBL), which started during World War II, there were at least three Jewish players: Thelma "Tiby" Eisen, Anita Foss, and Blanche Schachter. Eisen in particular became one of the league's star players and would later spend her time advocating for women's sports and helped keep the memory of the AAGPBL alive.

== Management ==
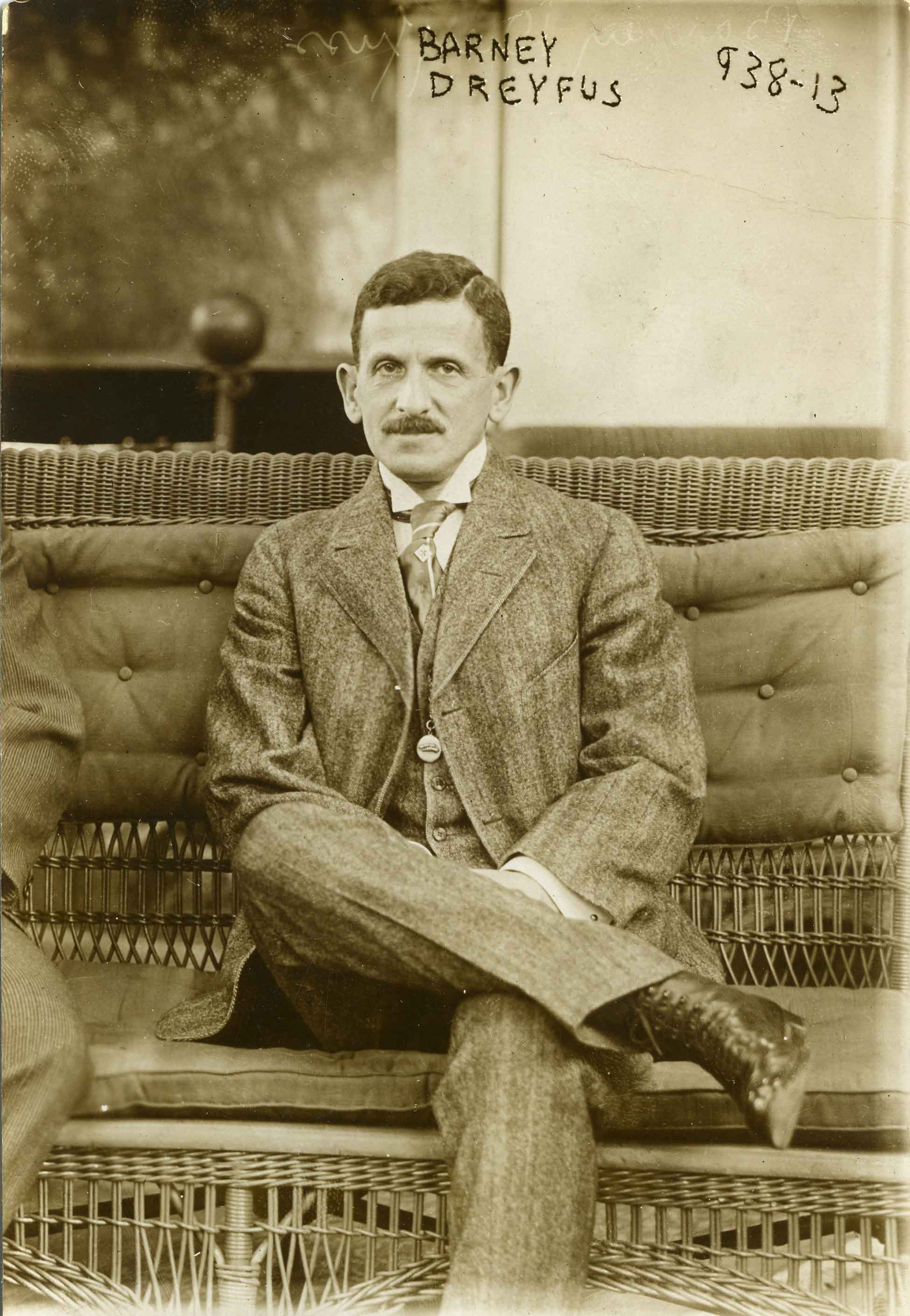
Barney Dreyfuss, founder of the World Series and owner of the Pittsburgh Pirates

In addition to players, Jews have contributed as executives as well. Most notable was that of Barney Dreyfuss, a Jewish immigrant from Germany and owner of the Pittsburgh Pirates. In 1902, Dreyfuss helped broker a "peace accord" that recognized the National League and American League as the two major leagues. The accord instituted a single set of rules, established agreements with the minor leagues, and recognized each league's rights to its own players.

It was from this deal that Dreyfuss suggested the idea of a World Series. In 1903, when the Pirates were on their way to win the National League pennant, he wrote to Henry Killilea, owner of the AL-leading Boston Americans:

The time has come for the National League and American League to organize a World Series,” Dreyfuss wrote. “It is my belief that if our clubs played a series on a best-of-nine basis, we would create great interest in baseball, in our leagues, and in our players. I also believe it would be a financial success.

Subsequently, the 1903 World Series was held in which Dreyfuss' Pirates were beaten by Killilea's Americans five games to three.

Beyond the World Series, Dreyfuss also financed the construction of Forbes Field, one of baseball's first modern steel and concrete baseball parks. In the aftermath of the Black Sox Scandal, he was instrumental in baseball hiring a commissioner to oversee the sport. For his contributions, he was elected to the Baseball Hall of Fame in 2008.

Years after Dreyfuss, another influential Jewish executive was Bud Selig. Selig, a native of Milwaukee, Wisconsin, played a major role as both the owner of the Milwaukee Brewers and as Commissioner of Baseball. As owner, after the move of the Milwaukee Braves to Atlanta, he was pivotal in baseball returning to Milwaukee, buying and the moving of the expansion Seattle Pilots to his home city after the team was declared bankrupt. As both acting commissioner and commissioner, Selig helped Major League Baseball grow as an industry and implemented a number of changes, including: expansion of MLB playoffs, introduction of interleague play, consolidating the AL and NL–which had acted separately for nearly a century–into a single entity which allowed for rapid growth and easier rule changes.

Though criticized for his handling of the 1994–95 Major League Baseball strike and the cancelling of the 1994 World Series as well as his handling of steroid usage around the league, both of which dealt a huge blow to the game's popularity, Selig also helped stabilize baseball's popularity after the strike ended and oversaw an unprecedented stretch of labor peace between the league and the Major League Baseball Players Association. When he left baseball in 2015, Major League Baseball had revenues around $10 billion compared to then $1 billion when he became commissioner. During his tenure, 23 new baseball stadiums were built and the league expanded by four teams, with two teams being added in each of the 1993 and 1998 expansions. Selig was elected to the Hall of Fame in 2017.

Rebecca Alpert, author of Out of Left Field: Jews and Black Baseball, also noted that Jewish owners and executives also played a significant role in the Negro leagues and its growth:

There was a fair amount of Jewish ownership of Negro League teams. They were in this business in part because they weren't allowed, as Jews, to be in other businesses. It's a similar story to the Hollywood story. And they were very supportive and helpful, they really helped a lot of the Negro League players make the transition to the major leagues and have a livelihood. The Negro Leagues did very well in the 1930s and '40s, and that was in part due to the influence of a lot of these Jewish owners.

Other notable Jewish baseball executives include Theo Epstein who, as general manager, helped break the championship droughts of the Boston Red Sox (in 2004) and the Chicago Cubs (in 2016); and owner Ted Lerner of the Washington Nationals who brought baseball back to Washington, D.C. after a thirty-four year absence which began with the Washington Senators' move to Texas in 1971.

== Labor union movement ==
One of the most impactful contributions is considered to be that of Marvin Miller, the first executive director of the Major League Baseball Players Association (MLBPA). Before his work with the MLBPA, Miller was a principle advisor and negotiator for the United Steelworkers and gained a reputation for being a tough negotiator. Elected to his position in spring 1966, Miller negotiation MLBPA's first collective bargaining agreement (CBA) with the team owners in 1968. That CBA, covering the 1968 and 1969 seasons, won the players a nearly 43 percent increase in the minimum salary from $7,000 to $10,000, as well as larger expense allowances. More importantly, the deal brought a formal structure to owner–player relations, including written procedures for the arbitration of player grievances before the commissioner.

Miller backed Curt Flood's fight against the reserve clause after he was traded from the St. Louis Cardinals to the Philadelphia Phillies. Flood felt the trade to be a punishment for asking for a raised throughout the 1969 season and hated Phillies fans who were, in Flood's eyes, racists due to their treatment towards Dick Allen, the Phillies star player for whom Flood had been traded. Flood refused to report to the Phillies, instead writing a letter to Bowie Kuhn, the then-commissioner of baseball, stating that he did not view himself as "property" and instructed Kuhn to notify all teams in Major League Baseball that he was willing to consider financial offers to play for any team during the 1970 season. Despite Miller's backing and full support, Flood lost the case of Flood v. Kuhn in the Supreme Court, destroying his career in the process but taking an important step towards free agency.

In 1974, Miller encouraged pitchers Andy Messersmith of the Los Angeles Dodgers and Dave McNally of the Baltimore Orioles to play out the succeeding year without signing a contract. He recognized that Flood's unsuccessful lawsuit opened up the possibility of other players challenging the reserve clause. Hence, after the year had elapsed, both players filed a grievance arbitration under the CBA. The ensuing Seitz decision declared that both players had fulfilled their contractual obligations and had no further legal ties to their teams. This effectively eradicated the reserve clause and ushered in free agency.

During Miller's tenure as the executive director of the MLBPA, the average player's annual salary rose from $19,000 in 1966 to $326,000 in 1982. Miller taught MLB players the basics of human capital as a commodity they were selling to club owners and educated them on trade-union thinking. The 1968 collective bargaining agreement was the first of its kind in pro sports. In 1970, players gained the right to have grievances heard by an impartial arbitrator. In 1973, they achieved a limited right to have salary demands subjected to arbitration. He also oversaw the first players strikes in MLB history, in 1972 and 1981, earning even more concessions for players.

In 1992, broadcaster Red Barber remarked of "Marvin Miller, along with Babe Ruth and Jackie Robinson, is one of the two or three most important men in baseball history", while former players Henry Aaron and Tom Seaver actively lobbied for his induction into the Hall of Fame. Despite many attempts to get him elected during his lifetime, Miller would not be elected until seven years after his death, when he became the fifth Jewish member of the Baseball Hall of Fame in 2019.

== Miscellaneous ==
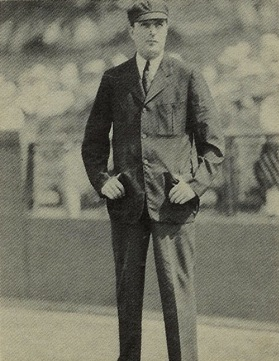
Dolly Stark, the first Jewish umpire in MLB history

The music of "Take Me Out to the Ball Game", one of the best known baseball songs which is played during the seventh-inning stretch at each ballgame, was composed by Jewish composer Albert Von Tilzer.

The first modern-day Jewish baseball umpire in MLB was Dolly Stark who worked in the National League from 1928 to 1935 and from 1937 to 1940. Since then, there have been four more: Al Clark, the only Jewish umpire to work in the American League before the two leagues merged into Major League Baseball, Al Forman, Al Cohen, and Stan Landes.

A number of Jewish baseball broadcasters have been the recipients of the Ford C. Frick Award, the Hall of Fame's award for broadcasting, including: Mel Allen, the inaugural winner, Bob Wolff, and Al Michaels. More recently, notable Jewish broadcasters are Gary Cohen and Howie Rose of the New York Mets, Suzyn Waldman and John Sterling of the New York Yankees, and Charley Steiner of the Los Angeles Dodgers.

Jewish sportswriters have played a major role in baseball as well, with many going on to be honored with the BBWAA Career Excellence Award, including: Murray Chass, longtime sportswriter with The New York Times; Jerome Holtzman, creator of the save and official historian of Major League Baseball; Shirley Povich, longtime writer with The Washington Post; Ross Newhan, writer for the Long Beach Press-Telegram and Los Angeles Times; and Leonard Koppett, longtime New York-based sportswriter.

Other notable Jewish sportswriters who contributed to baseball are: John Thorn, official historian of Major League Baseball and author of numerous baseball books; Jonathan Eig; biographer of Lou Gehrig; Jane Leavy, biographer for Sandy Koufax, Mickey Mantle, and Babe Ruth; Ira Berkow, biographer for Hank Greenberg; Roger Kahn, author of The Boys of Summer; Jeff Passan, baseball columnist for ESPN.com; and Marty Appel, former Yankees public relations manager and author of several baseball books.

== Outside the United States ==
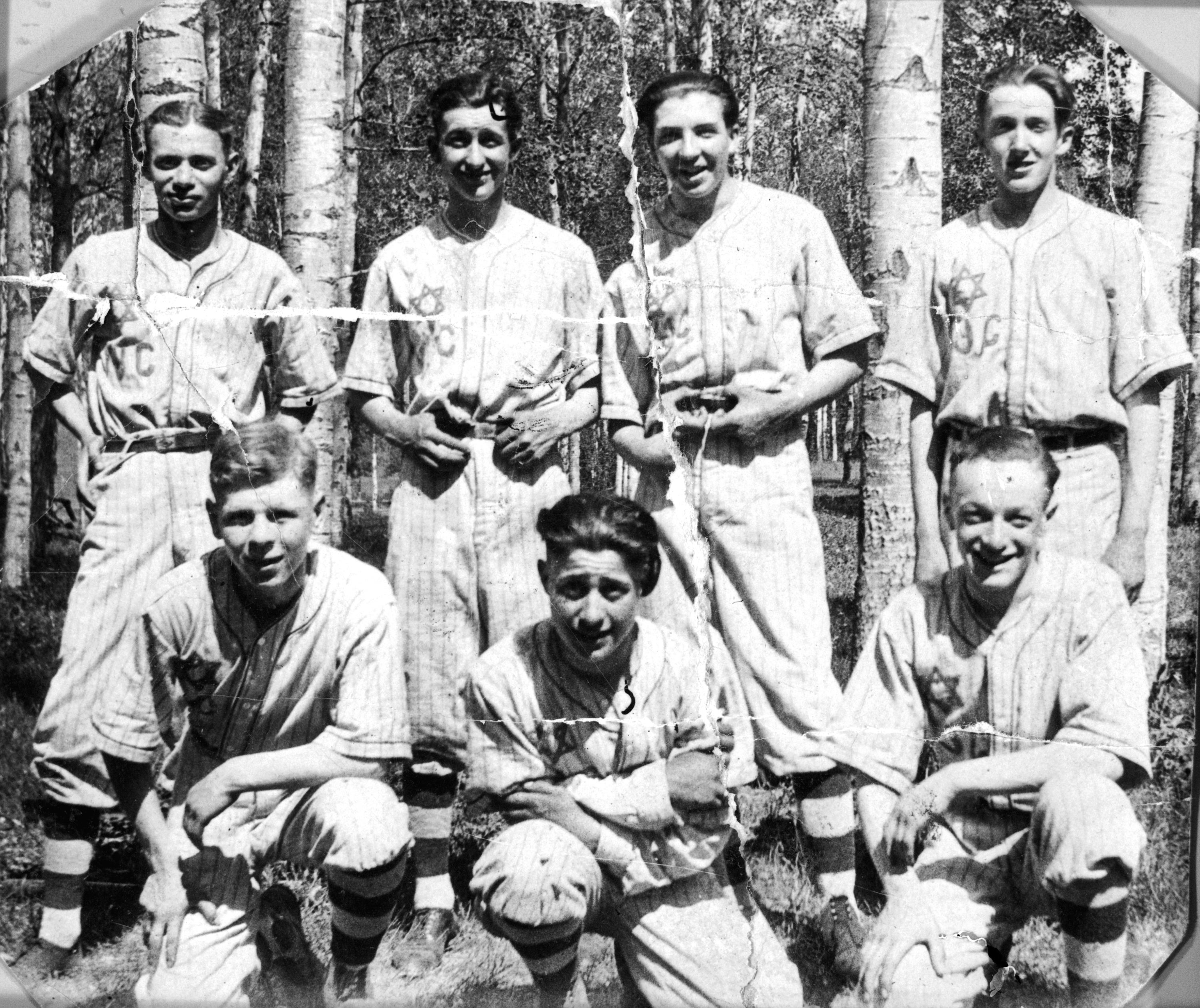
A Young Judea amateur baseball team in Alberta, Canada, c. 1923

Baseball was first played in the British Mandate of Palestine on July 4, 1927. In the 1970s, Jewish American immigrants started playing baseball in Israel, contributing to its growth. The first field in Israel was built in Kibbutz Gezer in 1979 and, in December 1986, the Israel Association of Baseball (IAB) was formed as a non-profit organization to develop baseball in the country.

The Israeli national baseball team has competed at the World Baseball Classic since the tournament's inception in 2005. At the 2017 World Baseball Classic championship, with a roster of Jewish American players, the Israeli team had what was called a "Cinderella run", advancing to the second round before being eliminated. The team has also taken part in the Olympic Games, making its debut in at the 2020 Summer Olympics.

In 2007, the Israel Baseball League was formed. Though the league itself was unsuccessful and lasted only one season, mainly due to mismanagement, it was the first exposure Israel had to American players who made up the rosters of the league and allowed for the development of the national team. In 2024, the Israel Baseball Americas launched an organization in the United States to help develop players and assist with the growth of the game in Israel.

Additionally, Jewish community groups such as Young Judea promote amateur baseball outside the United States, particularly in countries such as Canada and Israel.

== In media culture ==
There have been a number of books and documentaries which go in depth about the involvement of Jews in baseball. The most notable of these is Jews and Baseball: An American Love Story, a documentary film by Peter Miller which was written by sportswriter Ira Berkow. The film discussed the relationship between baseball and American Jews in detail, including a rare interview by Sandy Koufax.

While Greenberg and Koufax were the main subjects of the film, the movie also discussed how baseball was used to fight against stereotypes of Jews as non-athletic and bookish. It also talked about Jewish immigration and assimilation into American society as well as Jewish stars and notable players besides the two Hall of Famers, such as Al Rosen and Moe Berg.

Baseball historian John Thorn noted that Jewish baseball fans have become known for paying close attention to Jewish baseball players, both upcoming stars and prospects, and that there are sets of Major League Baseball cards dedicated to every Jewish player who has played in the Major Leagues, indicating the continuing importance of the game in the Jewish community.

== See also ==
- Jewish Baseball Museum
- Jews in jazz
- Jews in American cinema
- Jews in the civil rights movement

== External lists ==
- Jewish Baseball Museum
- Timeline of Jews in Baseball at the Jewish Baseball Museum
