= List of Jewish Major League Baseball players =

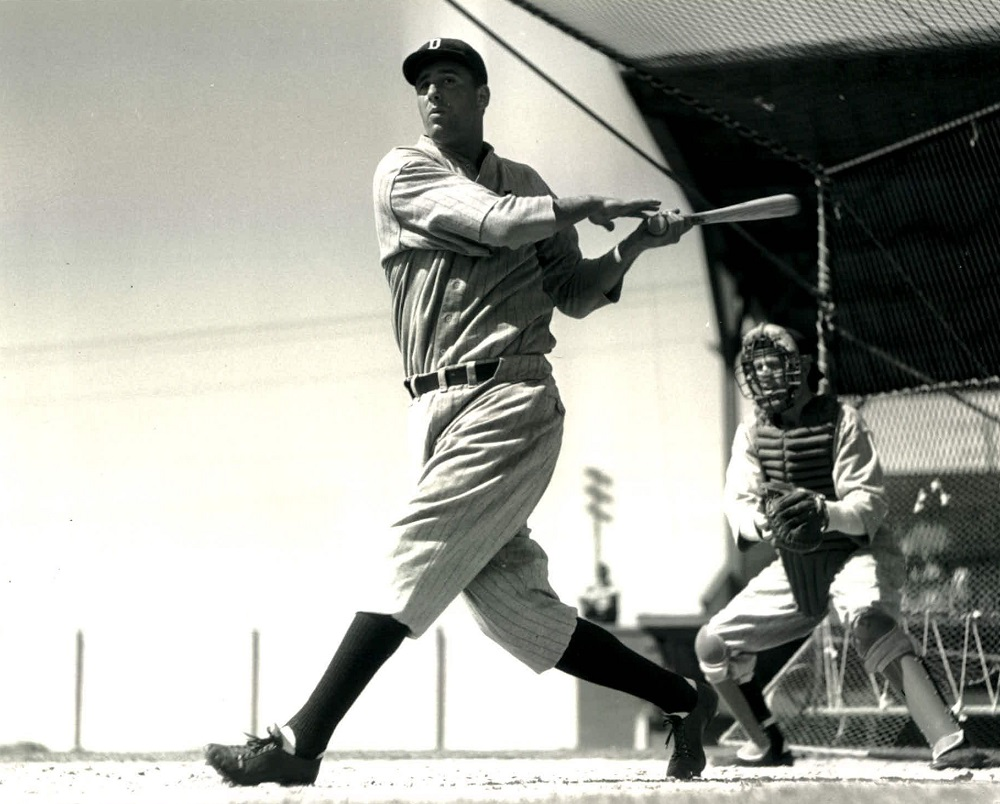
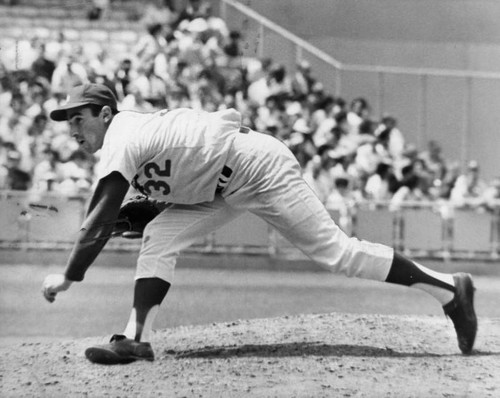
Hank Greenberg (left) and Sandy Koufax (right), the only Jewish baseball players to be elected to the Baseball Hall of Fame

Jewish players have played in Major League Baseball since the league came into existence in the late 19th century, and have a long and storied history within the game. There have been 190 players who identified as Jewish during their Major League career, including players who converted during or before their careers, and players who have or had at least one Jewish parent, and identified as Jewish by virtue of their parentage.

In the early years, Jewish baseball players faced constant antisemitic heckles from opponents and fans, with many hiding their heritage to avoid discrimination in the league. Despite this, a number of Jewish players overcame such abuse and went on to become stars. Two such players, Hank Greenberg and Sandy Koufax, were both elected to the Baseball Hall of Fame and are widely considered to be amongst the most important and iconic players in baseball and American history. The sport played a large part in the assimilation of American Jews into American society at a time of rampant antisemitism, and remains an important part of Jewish American culture today.

The criteria for this list have been taken from the Jewish Baseball Museum, a virtual museum dedicated to the preservation and recording of Jewish history and the involvement of Jews in baseball. The list includes players who identified as Jewish during their careers. Where the player has one parent who is Jewish and also identifies as Jewish or has converted before or during their careers, it is noted as such. Players who converted after their careers had ended or did not identify as Jewish despite having Jewish parentage are not listed.

== History of Jews in Major League Baseball ==
Jewish players have played in Major League Baseball since the league came into existence, with Lip Pike being the first. With the surge of Jewish immigrants from Europe to the United States at the turn of the 20th century, baseball, then the most popular sport in the country and referred to as the "National Pastime", became a way for children of Jewish immigrants to assimilate into American life. Sportswriter Jon Wertheim described baseball as being "interwoven with the American Jewish experience". Baseball historian John Thorn described it as an "agent of integration".

For many years, Jewish players who made it to the Major Leagues often changed their names and hid their identities in order to avoid antisemitism, at the time rampant in the country and the league. Industrialist Henry Ford, during the Black Sox Scandal and the alleged involvement of Jewish crime boss Arnold Rothstein in the fixing of the 1919 World Series, famously wrote about the gambling scene that was widespread in the sport at the time: "If fans wish to know the trouble with American baseball they have it in three words—too much Jew."

It was not until Hank Greenberg, the son of Orthodox Romanian-Jewish immigrants, broke into the Majors in 1930 with the Detroit Tigers that Jewish players stopped hiding their identities. Greenberg played in Detroit, which was home to Father Coughlin, a Catholic priest who used his radio program to broadcast antisemitic commentary, and Henry Ford who spread antisemitism through his newspaper The Dearborn Independent. He faced verbal abuse from opposing benches and fans. However, Greenberg never hid his Jewish identity, famously sitting out a game during a tight pennant race in 1934 due to it falling on Yom Kippur. He became the first Jewish player elected to the Baseball Hall of Fame.

After Greenberg, many Jewish players went on to become stars in the Jewish American communities. The most famous of those was Sandy Koufax of the Los Angeles Dodgers, widely considered to be one of the greatest pitchers in baseball history, who later became the second Jewish player elected to the Hall of Fame. Like Greenberg, Koufax sat out a game during the High Holy Days, famously refusing to pitch Game 1 of the 1965 World Series because it fell on Yom Kippur. Rabbi Rebecca Alpert stated that Koufax, who faced antisemitism as well, helped break stereotypes of Jewish men who were seen as being weak and bookish. His decision to sit out a World Series game became one of the most iconic moments for American Jews, making him "an important role model, and a real hero."

Since Greenberg and Koufax, Thorn noted that Jewish baseball fans have become known for paying close attention to Jewish baseball players, both upcoming stars and prospects, and that there are sets of Major League Baseball cards dedicated to every Jewish player who has played in the Major Leagues, indicating the continuing importance of the game in the Jewish community.

In 2010, a documentary film called Jews and Baseball: An American Love Story was released which discussed the relationship between baseball and American Jews in detail. While Greenberg and Koufax were the main subjects of the film, the movie also discussed how baseball was used to fight against stereotypes of Jews as non-athletic and bookish. It also talked about Jewish immigration and assimilation into American society as well as Jewish stars and notable players besides the two Hall of Famers, such as Al Rosen, Moe Berg, Kevin Youkilis, and Ryan Braun.

== List of players ==
=== A–F ===
A–F
Name	Position	Major League team(s)	Years active	Notes	Ref.
Cal Abrams	Outfielder	Brooklyn Dodgers; Cincinnati Reds; Pittsburgh Pirates; Baltimore Orioles; Chicago White Sox	1949–1956		
Lloyd Allen	Pitcher	California Angels; Texas Rangers; Chicago White Sox	1969–1975	Converted to Judaism	
Rubén Amaro Jr.	Outfielder	California Angels; Philadelphia Phillies; Cleveland Indians; Philadelphia Phillies (2)	1991–1998	Born to a Jewish mother	
Morrie Arnovich	Outfielder	Philadelphia Phillies; Cincinnati Reds; New York Giants	1936–1941, 1946	All-Star (1939); World Series champion with the 1940 Reds	
Brad Ausmus	Catcher	San Diego Padres; Detroit Tigers; Houston Astros; Detroit Tigers (2); Houston Astros (2); Los Angeles Dodgers	1993–2010	All-Star (1999); 3× Gold Glove Award winner (2001, 2002, 2006)	
Harrison Bader	Centerfielder	St. Louis Cardinals; New York Yankees; Cincinnati Reds; New York Mets; Minnesota Twins; Philadelphia Phillies; San Francisco Giants	2017–present	Born to a Jewish father; Gold Glove Award winner (2021)	
Jesse Baker	Shortstop	Washington Senators	1919	Born "Michael Myron Silverman"; Played in only one Major League game	
Brian Bark	Pitcher	Boston Red Sox	1995		
Ross Baumgarten	Pitcher	Chicago White Sox; Pittsburgh Pirates	1978–1982		
José Bautista	Pitcher	Baltimore Orioles; Chicago Cubs; San Francisco Giants; Detroit Tigers; St. Louis Cardinals	1988–1997	Born to a Jewish mother	
Joe Bennett	Third baseman	Philadelphia Phillies	1923	Played in only one Major League game	
Moe Berg	Catcher	Brooklyn Robins; Chicago White Sox; Cleveland Indians; Washington Senators; Boston Red Sox	1923–1939	Served as a spy during World War II for the Office of Strategic Services; Awarded the Medal of Freedom from President Harry Truman	
Nate Berkenstock	Right fielder	Philadelphia Athletics	1871	Played in only one Major League game	
Jake Bird	Pitcher	Colorado Rockies; New York Yankees	2022-present	Born to a Jewish father	
Bob Berman	Catcher	Washington Senators	1918		
Jeremy Bleich	Pitcher	Oakland Athletics	2018		
Richard Bleier	Pitcher	New York Yankees; Baltimore Orioles; Miami Marlins; Boston Red Sox	2016–2023		
Cy Block	Second baseman; Third baseman	Chicago Cubs	1942, 1945–1946		
Ron Blomberg	Designated hitter; First baseman; Right fielder	New York Yankees; Chicago White Sox	1969, 1971–1976, 1978		
Sam Bohne	Second baseman	St. Louis Cardinals; Cincinnati Reds; Brooklyn Robins	1916, 1921–1926	Original surname was "Cohen"	
Henry Bostick	Third baseman	Philadelphia Athletics	1915	Original surname was "Lipschitz"	
Ryan Braun	Outfielder	Milwaukee Brewers	2007–2020	Born to a Jewish father; 6× All-Star (2008–2012, 2015); NL MVP (2011); 5× Silver Slugger Award winner (2008–2012)	
Alex Bregman	Third baseman	Houston Astros; Boston Red Sox; Chicago Cubs	2016–present	3× All-Star (2018, 2019, 2025); 2× World Series champion with the 2017 and 2022 Astros	
Craig Breslow	Relief pitcher	San Diego Padres; Boston Red Sox; Cleveland Indians; Minnesota Twins; Oakland Athletics; Arizona Diamondbacks; Boston Red Sox (2); Miami Marlins; Minnesota Twins (2); Cleveland Indians (2)	2005–2006, 2008–2017	World Series champion with the 2013 Red Sox	
Louis Brower	Shortstop	Detroit Tigers	1931		
Conrad Cardinal	Pitcher	Houston Colt .45s	1963		
Frank Charles	Catcher	Houston Astros	2000	Born to a Jewish mother	
Harry Chozen	Catcher	Cincinnati Reds	1937		
Tony Cogan	Relief pitcher	Kansas City Royals	2001		
Alta Cohen	Outfielder	Brooklyn Robins / Dodgers; Philadelphia Phillies	1931–1933		
Andy Cohen	Second baseman	New York Giants	1926, 1928–1929		
Hy Cohen	Pitcher	Chicago Cubs	1955		
Syd Cohen	Pitcher	Washington Senators	1934, 1936–1937		
Dick Conger	Pitcher	Detroit Tigers; Pittsburgh Pirates; Philadelphia Phillies	1940–1943		
Phil Cooney	Third baseman	New York Highlanders	1905	Original surname was "Cohen"; Played in only one Major League game	
Ed Corey	Pitcher	Chicago White Sox	1918	Original surname was "Cohen"; Played in only one Major League game	
Bill Cristall	Pitcher	Cleveland Blues	1901		
Harry Danning	Catcher	New York Giants	1933–1942	4× All-Star (1938–1941)	
Ike Danning	Catcher	St. Louis Browns	1928		
Bob Davis	Pitcher	Kansas City Athletics	1958, 1960		
Ike Davis	First baseman	New York Mets; Pittsburgh Pirates; Oakland Athletics; New York Yankees	2010–2016	Born to a Jewish mother	
Cody Decker	First baseman; Outfielder	San Diego Padres	2015		
Scott Effross	Pitcher	Chicago Cubs; New York Yankees	2021–present		
Harry Eisenstat	Starting pitcher	Brooklyn Dodgers; Detroit Tigers; Cleveland Indians	1935–1942		
Mike Epstein	First baseman	Baltimore Orioles; Washington Senators; Oakland Athletics; Texas Rangers; California Angels	1966–1974	World Series champion with the 1972 Athletics	
Reuben Ewing	Outfielder	St. Louis Cardinals	1921	Original surname was "Cohen"	
Al Federoff	Second baseman	Detroit Tigers	1951–1952		
Eddie Feinberg	Utility player	Philadelphia Phillies	1938–1939		
Harry Feldman	Pitcher	New York Giants	1941–1946		
Scott Feldman	Pitcher	Texas Rangers; Chicago Cubs; Baltimore Orioles; Houston Astros; Toronto Blue Jays; Cincinnati Reds	2005–2017		
Leo Fishel	Pitcher	New York Giants	1899		
Jake Fishman	Pitcher	Miami Marlins	2022	Currently playing in the Atlantic League	
Matt Ford	Pitcher	Milwaukee Brewers	2003		
Happy Foreman	Pitcher	Chicago White Sox; Boston Red Sox	1924, 1926		
Micah Franklin	Outfielder	St. Louis Cardinals	1997	Born to a Jewish mother	
Moe Franklin	Shortstop	Detroit Tigers	1941–1942		
Nate Freiman	First baseman	Oakland Athletics	2013–2014		
Max Fried	Starting pitcher	Atlanta Braves; New York Yankees	2017–present	3x All-Star (2022, 2024, 2025); World Series champion with the 2021 Braves; 3× Gold Glove Award winner (2020–2022); Silver Slugger Award winner (2021)	
Sam Fuld	Outfielder	Chicago Cubs; Tampa Bay Rays; Oakland Athletics; Minnesota Twins; Oakland Athletics (2)	2007, 2009–2015		

=== G–P ===
G–P
Name	Position	Major League team(s)	Years active	Notes	Ref.
Milt Galatzer	Outfielder	Cleveland Indians; Cincinnati Reds	1933–1936, 1939		
Zack Gelof	Second baseman	Oakland Athletics	2023–present		
Mark Gilbert	Outfielder	Chicago White Sox	1985	Served as the United States Ambassador to New Zealand and Samoa from 2015 to 2017	
Joe Ginsberg	Catcher	Detroit Tigers; Cleveland Indians; Kansas City Athletics; Baltimore Orioles; Chicago White Sox; Boston Red Sox; New York Mets	1948, 1950–1954, 1956–1962		
Keith Glauber	Pitcher	Cincinnati Reds	1998, 2000		
Brad Goldberg	Pitcher	Chicago White Sox	2017		
Jonah Goldman	Shortstop; Third baseman	Cleveland Indians	1928–1931		
Izzy Goldstein	Pitcher	Detroit Tigers	1932		
Jake Goodman	First baseman	Milwaukee Grays; Pittsburgh Alleghenys	1878, 1882		
Sid Gordon	Outfielder; Third baseman	New York Giants; Boston / Milwaukee Braves; Pittsburgh Pirates; New York Giants	1941–1943, 1946–1955	2× All-Star (1948, 1949); Served in the U.S. Armed Forces during World War II from 1944 to 1945	
Herb Gorman	Pinch hitter	St. Louis Cardinals	1952	Played in only one Major League game	
John Grabow	Relief pitcher	Pittsburgh Pirates; Chicago Cubs	2003–2011		
Shawn Green	Right fielder	Toronto Blue Jays; Los Angeles Dodgers; Arizona Diamondbacks; New York Mets	1993–2007	2× All-Star (1999, 2002); Gold Glove Award winner (1999); Silver Slugger Award winner (1999); Hit 4 home runs in one game on May 23, 2002	
Adam Greenberg	Outfielder	Chicago Cubs; Miami Marlins	2005, 2012		
Hank Greenberg	First baseman; Left fielder	Detroit Tigers; Pittsburgh Pirates	1930, 1933–1941, 1945–1947	5× All-Star (1937–1940, 1945); 2× AL MVP (1935, 1940); 2× World Series champion with the 1935 and 1945 Tigers; Served in the U.S. Armed Forces during World War II from 1942 to 1945; Member of the National Baseball Hall of Fame	
Dalton Guthrie	Utility player	Philadelphia Phillies	2022–2023	Currently in the Boston Red Sox organization	
Eric Helfand	Catcher	Oakland Athletics	1993–1995		
Steve Hertz	Third baseman	Houston Colt .45s	1964		
Jason Hirsh	Pitcher	Houston Astros; Colorado Rockies	2006–2008		
Ken Holtzman	Starting pitcher	Chicago Cubs; Oakland Athletics; Baltimore Orioles; New York Yankees; Chicago Cubs (2)	1965–1979	2× All-Star (1972, 1973); 3× World Series champion with the 1972, 1973, and 1974 Athletics; Pitched two no-hitters	
Spencer Horwitz	First baseman	Toronto Blue Jays; Pittsburgh Pirates	2023–present		
Brian Horwitz	Outfielder	San Francisco Giants	2008		
Bill Hurst	Pitcher	Florida Marlins	1996		
Skip Jutze	Catcher	St. Louis Cardinals; Houston Astros; Seattle Mariners	1972–1977	Converted to Judaism	
Ryan Kalish	Outfielder	Boston Red Sox; Chicago Cubs	2010, 2012, 2014, 2016	Born to a Jewish father; raised Catholic but no longer practicing and identifies as Jewish	
Rob Kaminsky	Pitcher	St. Louis Cardinals	2020	Currently in the Seattle Mariners organization	
Harry Kane	Pitcher	St. Louis Browns; Detroit Tigers; Philadelphia Phillies	1902–1906	Original surname was "Kohn" or "Cohen"	
Gabe Kapler	Outfielder	Detroit Tigers; Texas Rangers; Colorado Rockies; Boston Red Sox; Milwaukee Brewers; Tampa Bay Rays	2000–2005, 2005–2010	World Series champion with the 2004 Red Sox	
Herb Karpel	Pitcher	New York Yankees	1946		
Ty Kelly	Utility player	New York Mets; Philadelphia Phillies; New York Mets	2016–2018	Born to a Jewish mother	
Ian Kinsler	Second baseman	Texas Rangers; Detroit Tigers; Los Angeles Angels; Boston Red Sox; San Diego Padres	2006–2019		
Alan Koch	Pitcher	Detroit Tigers; Washington Senators	1963–1964		
Mike Koplove	Pitcher	Arizona Diamondbacks; Cleveland Indians	2001–2007	Born to a Jewish father	
Sandy Koufax	Starting pitcher	Brooklyn / Los Angeles Dodgers	1955–1966	Original surname was "Braun"; 7× All-Star (1961–1962, 1963–1966); NL MVP (1963); 3× Cy Young Award winner (1963, 1965, 1966); 4× World Series champion with the 1955, 1959, 1963, and 1965 Dodgers; 2× World Series MVP (1963, 1965); Pitched 4 no-hitters, including a perfect game; Member of the National Baseball Hall of Fame	
Brian Kowitz	Outfielder	Atlanta Braves	1995		
Evan Kravetz	Relief pitcher	Cincinnati Reds	2024		
Dean Kremer	Starting pitcher	Baltimore Orioles	2020–present		
Barry Latman	Pitcher	Chicago White Sox; Cleveland Indians; Los Angeles / California Angels; Houston Astros	1957–1967	All-Star (1961)	
Ryan Lavarnway	Catcher	Boston Red Sox; Baltimore Orioles; Atlanta Braves; Oakland Athletics; Pittsburgh Pirates; Cincinnati Reds; Miami Marlins; Cleveland Indians	2011–2021	Born to a Jewish mother	
Max Lazar	Relief pitcher	Philadelphia Phillies	2024–present		
Jim Levey	Shortstop	St. Louis Browns	1930–1933	Played in the National Football League as halfback for the Pittsburgh Pirates from 1934 to 1936	
Al Levine	Relief pitcher	Chicago White Sox; Texas Rangers; Anaheim Angels; Tampa Bay Devil Rays; Kansas City Royals; Detroit Tigers; San Francisco Giants	1996–2005		
Jesse Levis	Catcher	Cleveland Indians; Milwaukee Brewers; Cleveland Indians (2); Milwaukee Brewers (2)	1992–2001		
Oscar Levis	Pitcher	New York Cuban Stars; Hilldale Club	1921–1931	Original surname was "Levy"; Born to a Jewish father; Played in the Negro leagues which were officially recognized as major leagues by MLB in 2020	
Mike Lieberthal	Catcher	Philadelphia Phillies; Los Angeles Dodgers	1994–2007	Born to a Jewish father; 2× All-Star (1999, 2000); Gold Glove Award winner (1999)	
Lou Limmer	First baseman	Philadelphia Athletics	1951, 1954		
Andrew Lorraine	Pitcher	California Angels; Chicago White Sox; Oakland Athletics; Seattle Mariners; Chicago Cubs; Cleveland Indians; Milwaukee Brewers	1994–1995, 1997–2000, 2002		
Elliott Maddox	Outfielder; Third baseman	Detroit Tigers; Washington Senators / Texas Rangers; New York Yankees; Baltimore Orioles; New York Mets	1970–1980	Converted to Judaism	
Cy Malis	Pitcher	Philadelphia Phillies	1934	Played in only one Major League game	
Moxie Manuel	Pitcher	Washington Senators; Chicago White Sox	1905, 1908		
Duke Markell	Pitcher	St. Louis Browns	1951	Born "Henri Duquesne Makowski"	
Jason Marquis	Pitcher	Atlanta Braves; St. Louis Cardinals; Chicago Cubs; Colorado Rockies; Washington Nationals; Arizona Diamondbacks; Minnesota Twins; San Diego Padres; Cincinnati Reds	2000–2013, 2015	All-Star (2009); Silver Slugger Award winner (2005)	
Ed Mayer	Pitcher	Chicago Cubs	1957–1958		
Erskine Mayer	Pitcher	Philadelphia Phillies; Pittsburgh Pirates; Chicago White Sox	1912–1919		
Sam Mayer	Outfielder	Washington Senators	1915		
Ed Mensor	Outfielder	Pittsburgh Pirates	1912–1914		
Matt Mervis	First baseman	Chicago Cubs; Miami Marlins	2023–present		
Mike Milchin	Pitcher	Minnesota Twins; Baltimore Orioles	1996		
Norm Miller	Right fielder	Houston Astros; Atlanta Braves	1965–1974		
Jon Moscot	Pitcher	Cincinnati Reds	2015–2016		
Sam Nahem	Pitcher	Brooklyn Dodgers; St. Louis Cardinals; Philadelphia Phillies	1938, 1941–1942, 1948	Served in the U.S. Armed Forces during World War II from 1942 to 1945	
Jeff Newman	Catcher; First baseman	Oakland Athletics; Boston Red Sox	1976–1984	Converted to Judaism; All-Star (1979)	
Joc Pederson	Outfielder; Designated hitter	Los Angeles Dodgers; Atlanta Braves; San Francisco Giants; Arizona Diamondbacks; Texas Rangers	2014–present	Born to a Jewish mother; 2× All-Star (2015, 2022); 2× World Series champion with the 2020 Dodgers and 2021 Braves	
Barney Pelty	Pitcher	St. Louis Browns; Washington Senators	1903–1912		
Israel Pike	Outfielder	Brooklyn Hartfords	1877	Played in only one Major League game	
Lip Pike	Outfielder; Second baseman	Troy Haymakers; Baltimore Canaries; Hartford Dark Blues; St. Louis Brown Stockings; Cincinnati Reds; Providence Grays; Worcester Worcesters; New York Metropolitans	1871–1878, 1881, 1887	First Jewish player to play in Major League Baseball	
Kevin Pillar	Outfielder	Toronto Blue Jays; San Francisco Giants; Boston Red Sox; Colorado Rockies; New York Mets; Los Angeles Dodgers; Atlanta Braves; Chicago White Sox; Los Angeles Angels; Texas Rangers	2013–2025	Born to a Jewish mother	
Jake Pitler	Second baseman	Pittsburgh Pirates	1917–1918		
Aaron Poreda	Relief pitcher	Chicago White Sox; San Diego Padres; Texas Rangers	2009, 2014		

=== R–Z ===
R–Z
Name	Position	Major League team(s)	Years active	Notes	Ref.
Steve Ratzer	Pitcher	Montreal Expos	1980–1981		
Jimmie Reese	Second baseman; Third baseman	New York Yankees; St. Louis Cardinals	1930–1932	Born "Hyman Solomon"	
Al Richter	Shortstop	Boston Red Sox	1951, 1953		
Dave Roberts	Pitcher	San Diego Padres; Houston Astros; Detroit Tigers; Chicago Cubs; San Francisco Giants; Pittsburgh Pirates; Seattle Mariners; New York Mets	1969–1981	Born to a Jewish father; World Series champion with the 1979 Pirates	
Saul Rogovin	Pitcher	Detroit Tigers; Chicago White Sox; Baltimore Orioles; Philadelphia Phillies	1949–1953, 1955–1957		
Al Rosen	Third baseman	Cleveland Indians	1947–1956	4× All-Star (1952–1955); AL MVP (1953); World Series champion with the 1948 Indians	
Goody Rosen	Outfielder	Brooklyn Dodgers; New York Giants	1937–1939, 1944–1946	All-Star (1945)	
Harry Rosenberg	Outfielder	New York Giants	1930		
Kenny Rosenberg	Pitcher	Los Angeles Angels	2022–2024	Currently playing in the KBO League.	
Lou Rosenberg	Second basemen; Shortstop	Chicago White Sox	1923		
Steve Rosenberg	Pitcher	Chicago White Sox; San Diego Padres	1988–1991		
Max Rosenfeld	Outfielder	Brooklyn Robins / Dodgers	1931–1933		
Sy Rosenthal	Outfielder	Boston Red Sox	1925–1926		
Wayne Rosenthal	Pitcher	Texas Rangers	1991–1992		
Bubby Rossman	Pitcher	Philadelphia Phillies	2022		
Marv Rotblatt	Pitcher	Chicago White Sox	1948, 1950–1951		
Mickey Rutner	Third baseman	Philadelphia Athletics	1947		
Ryan Sadowski	Pitcher	San Francisco Giants	2009		
Mike Saipe	Pitcher	Colorado Rockies	1998		
Ike Samuels	Third baseman	St. Louis Browns	1895		
Josh Satin	Second baseman	New York Mets	2011–2014		
Moe Savransky	Pitcher	Cincinnati Redlegs	1954		
Al Schacht	Pitcher	Washington Senators	1919–1921		
Sid Schacht	Pitcher	St. Louis Browns; Boston Braves	1950–1951		
Hal Schacker	Pitcher	Boston Braves	1945		
Heinie Scheer	Second baseman	Philadelphia Athletics	1922–1923		
Richie Scheinblum	Outfielder	Cleveland Indians; Washington Senators; Kansas City Royals; Cincinnati Reds; California Angels; Kansas City Royals; St. Louis Cardinals	1965, 1967–1969, 1971–1974	All-Star (1972)	
Mike Schemer	First baseman	New York Giants	1945–1946		
Scott Schoeneweis	Pitcher	Anaheim Angels; Chicago White Sox; Toronto Blue Jays; Cincinnati Reds; New York Mets; Arizona Diamondbacks; Boston Red Sox	1999–2010	Born to a Jewish mother	
Mike Schwimer	Pitcher	Philadelphia Phillies	2011–2012		
Art Shamsky	Outfielder; First baseman	Cincinnati Reds; New York Mets; Chicago Cubs; Oakland Athletics	1965–1972	World Series champion with the 1969 Mets	
Dick Sharon	Outfielder	Detroit Tigers; San Diego Padres	1973–1975	Born to a Jewish father	
Ryan Sherriff	Pitcher	St. Louis Cardinals; Tampa Bay Rays; Boston Red Sox	2017–2023		
Larry Sherry	Relief pitcher	Los Angeles Dodgers; Detroit Tigers; Houston Astros; California Angels	1958–1969	World Series champion with the 1959 Dodgers; World Series MVP (1959)	
Norm Sherry	Catcher	Los Angeles Dodgers; New York Mets	1959–1963		
Harry Shuman	Pitcher	Pittsburgh Pirates; Philadelphia Phillies	1942–1944		
Jared Shuster	Pitcher	Atlanta Braves; Chicago White Sox	2023–present		
Al Silvera	Left fielder	Cincinnati Redlegs	1955–1956		
Fred Sington	Outfielder	Washington Senators; Brooklyn Dodgers	1934–1939		
Mose Solomon	Outfielder	New York Giants	1923		
Bill Starr	Catcher	Washington Senators	1935–1936		
Jeff Stember	Pitcher	San Francisco Giants	1980		
Adam Stern	Outfielder	Boston Red Sox; Baltimore Orioles; Milwaukee Brewers	2005–2006, 2010	Born to a Jewish father	
Robert Stock	Pitcher	San Diego Padres; Boston Red Sox; Chicago Cubs; New York Mets	2018–present		
Steve Stone	Starting pitcher	San Francisco Giants; Chicago White Sox; Chicago Cubs; Chicago White Sox (2); Baltimore Orioles	1971–1981	All-Star (1980); AL Cy Young Award winner (1980)	
Garrett Stubbs	Catcher	Houston Astros; Philadelphia Phillies	2019–present	Born to a Jewish mother	
Bud Swartz	Pitcher	St. Louis Browns	1947		
Don Taussig	Outfielder	San Francisco Giants; St. Louis Cardinals; Houston Colt .45s	1958, 1961–1962		
Rowdy Tellez	First baseman	Toronto Blue Jays; Milwaukee Brewers; Pittsburgh Pirates; Seattle Mariners; Texas Rangers	2018–present	Born to a Jewish mother	
Bob Tufts	Pitcher	San Francisco Giants; Kansas City Royals	1981–1983	Converted to Judaism	
Eddie Turchin	Shortstop; Third baseman	Cleveland Indians	1943		
Danny Valencia	Third baseman	Minnesota Twins; Boston Red Sox; Baltimore Orioles; Kansas City Royals; Toronto Blue Jays; Oakland Athletics; Seattle Mariners; Baltimore Orioles (2)	2010–2018		
Steve Wapnick	Pitcher	Detroit Tigers; Chicago White Sox	1990, 1991		
Justin Wayne	Pitcher	Florida Marlins	2002–2004		
Lefty Weinert	Pitcher	Philadelphia Phillies; Chicago Cubs; New York Yankees	1919–1924, 1927–1928, 1931		
Phil Weintraub	First baseman; Outfielder	New York Giants; Cincinnati Reds; New York Giants (2); Philadelphia Phillies; New York Giants (3)	1933–1935, 1937–1938, 1944–1945		
Zack Weiss	Pitcher	Cincinnati Reds; Los Angeles Angels; Boston Red Sox	2018, 2022–2023	Currently in the St. Louis Cardinals organization	
Josh Whitesell	First baseman	Arizona Diamondbacks	2008–2009		
Ed Wineapple	Pitcher	Washington Senators	1929	Played in only one Major League game	
Larry Yellen	Pitcher	Houston Colt .45s	1963–1964		
Kevin Youkilis	First baseman; Third baseman; Left fielder	Boston Red Sox; Chicago White Sox; New York Yankees	2004–2013	3× All-Star (2008, 2009, 2011); 2× World Series champion with the 2004 and 2007 Red Sox; Gold Glove Award winner (2007)	
Josh Zeid	Pitcher	Houston Astros	2013–2014		
Eddie Zosky	Shortstop	Toronto Blue Jays; Florida Marlins; Milwaukee Brewers; Houston Astros	1991–1992, 1995, 1999, 2000	Born to a Jewish mother	

== Gallery ==
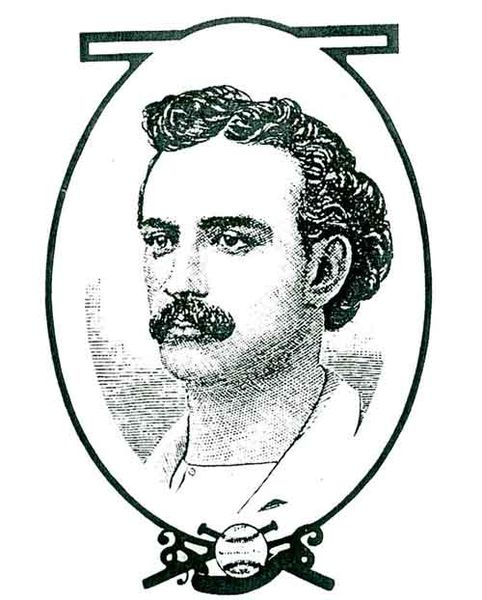
Lip Pike, the first Jewish Major League Baseball player and one of the first professional baseball players in history

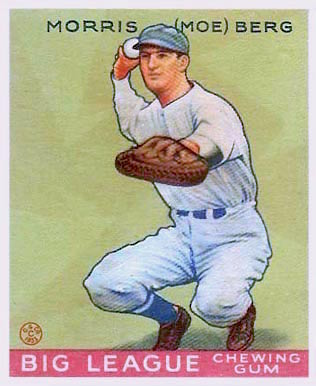
Moe Berg, a catcher who became better known for being a U.S. spy during World War II

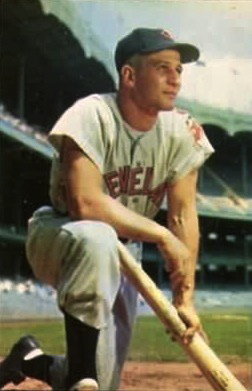
Al Rosen, nicknamed "The Hebrew Hammer", star third baseman of the Cleveland Indians

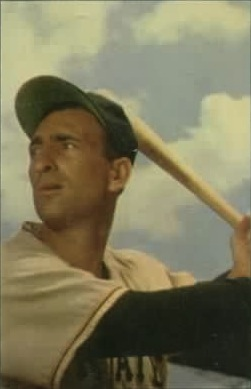
Cal Abrams, one of the "Boys of Summer" players who played for the Brooklyn Dodgers teams of the 1940s and 1950s

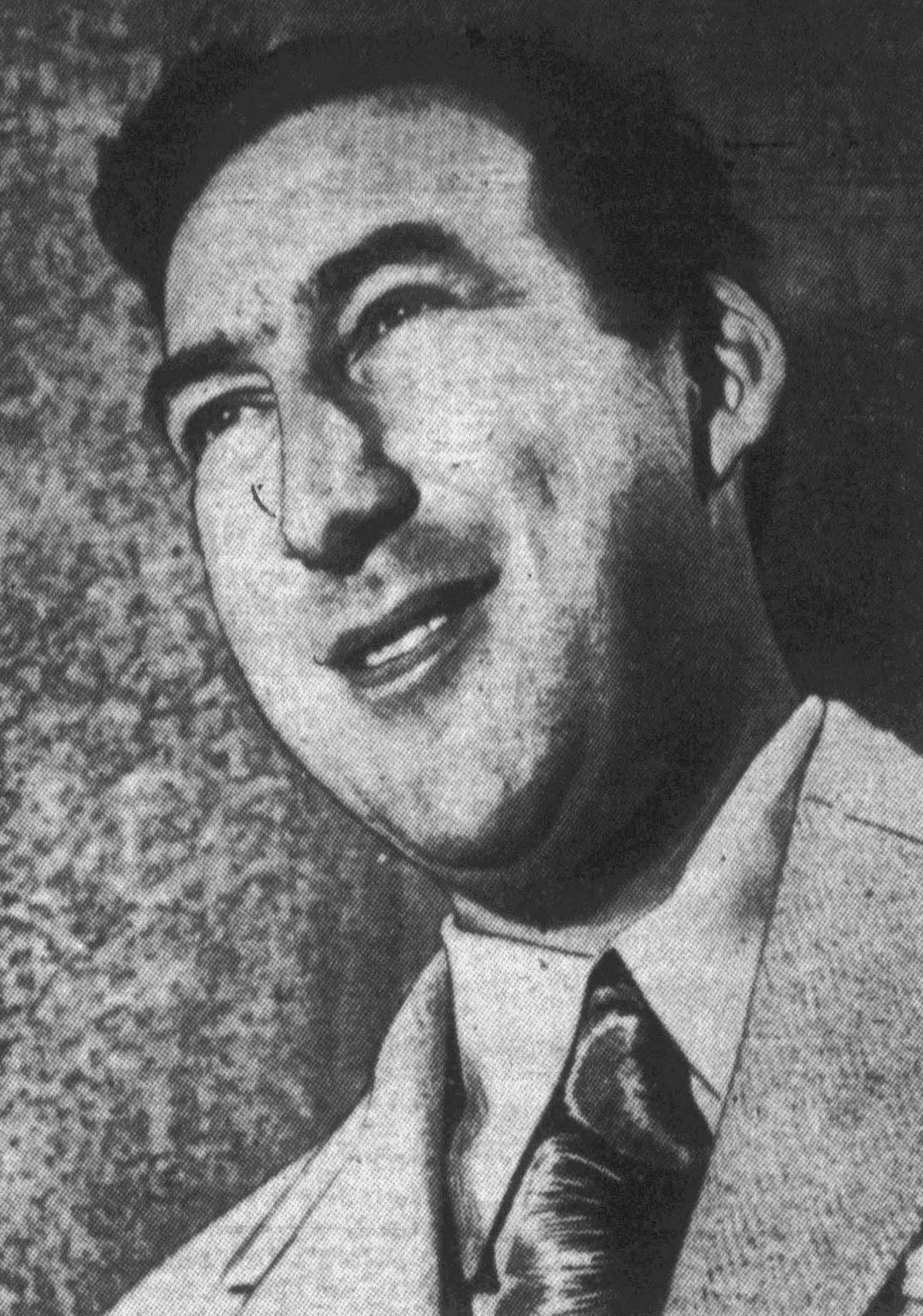
Harry "the Horse" Danning, All-Star catcher for the New York Giants in the 1930s and 40s

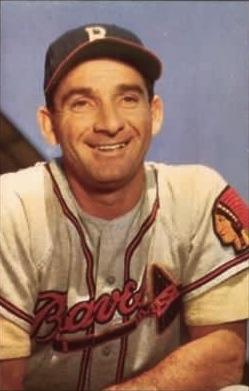
Sid Gordon, an All-Star, five-tool outfielder for the Giants

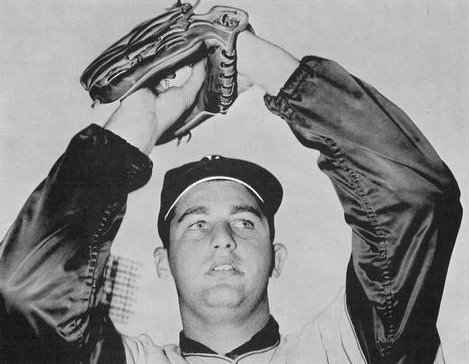
Larry Sherry, relief pitcher and 1959 World Series MVP for the Los Angeles Dodgers

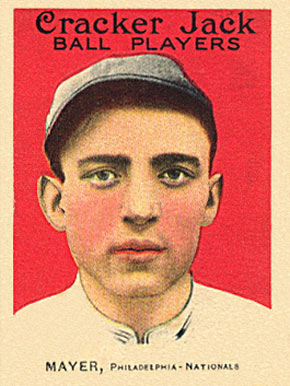
Erskine Mayer, the first Jewish player to appear in a World Series game, starting Game 2 of the 1915 World Series

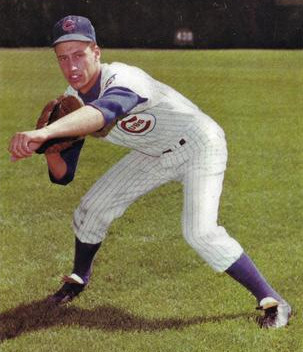
Ken Holtzman, the all-time wins leader amongst Jewish pitchers in Major League history

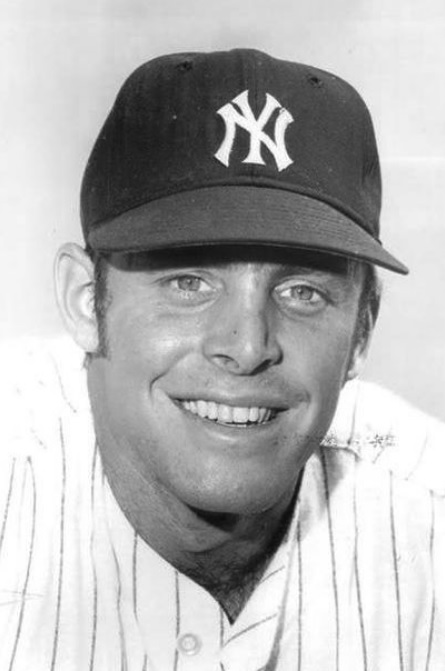
Ron Blomberg, the first designated hitter in MLB history

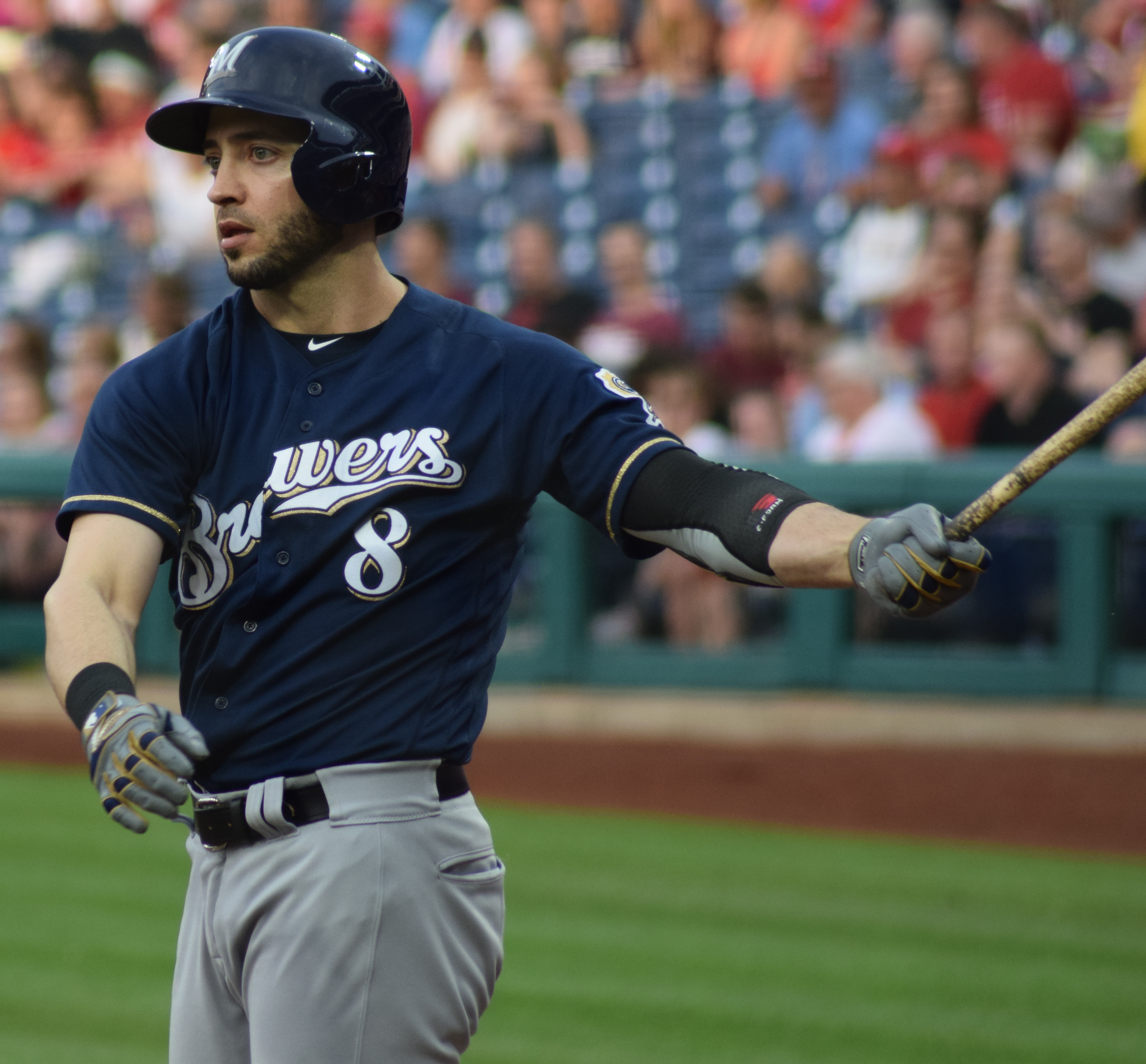
Ryan Braun, five-time Silver Slugger winner and MVP winner for the Milwaukee Brewers

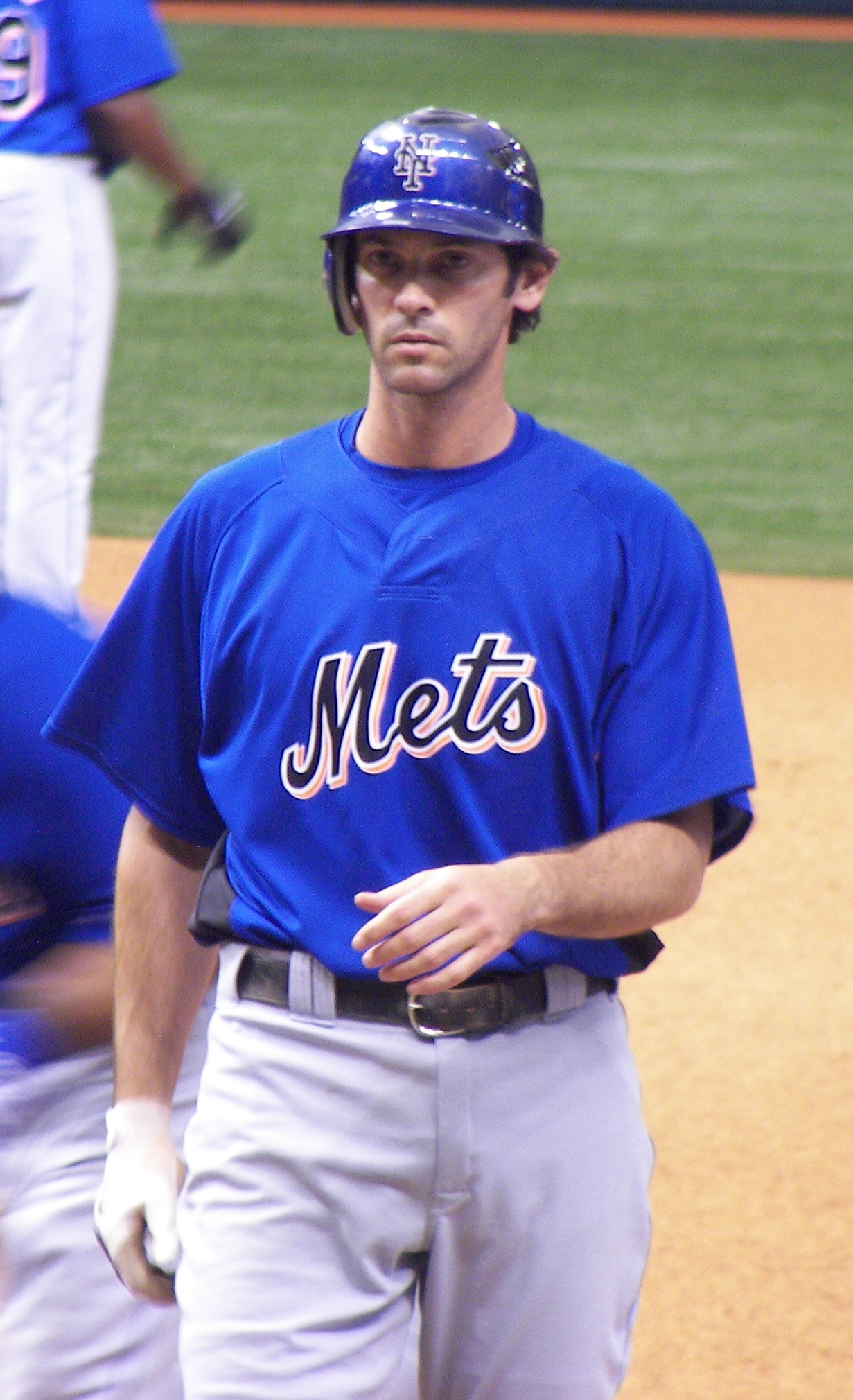
Shawn Green, one of 21 players in MLB history to hit 4 home runs in one game

== See also ==
- List of Jews in sports
- List of Jewish American sportspeople
