= Al Cohen =

Al Cohen may refer to:

- Al Cohen (magician), 1926–2020, magician and owner of magic shop
- Al Cohen (umpire), 1927–2007, MLB umpire

== See also ==
- Al Cohn, jazz saxophonist
