= Jews and Baseball: An American Love Story =

- DVD cover
- Directed by: Peter Miller
- Written by: Ira Berkow
- Produced by: Will Hechter; Peter Miller
- Narrated by: Dustin Hoffman
- Cinematography: Antonio Rossi; Stephen McCarthy; Allen Moore
- Edited by: Amy Linton
- Music by: Michael Roth
- Production company: Clear Lake Historical Productions
- Distributed by: Seventh Art Releasing
- Release dates: July 25, 2010 (Stony Brook); November 5, 2010 (United States)
- Running time: 91 minutes
- Country: United States
- Language: English

Jews and Baseball: An American Love Story is a 2010 American documentary film narrated by Academy Award-winner Dustin Hoffman, written by Pulitzer Prize-winner Ira Berkow, and directed by award-winning documentary filmmaker Peter Miller. It is about the connection and history between American Jews and baseball.

Kenneth Turan of The Los Angeles Times wrote that the "warm and enthusiastic" film "not only lives up to its title... but also delivers a bit extra as well". The documentary received the Best Editing Award at the Breckenridge Film Festival for Editor Amy Linton, the Audience Choice Award at the 2011 Greater Phoenix Jewish Film Festival, and the Audience Choice Award for Best Feature Documentary at the 2011 Seattle Jewish Film Festival.

== Synopsis ==
The film was written by Pulitzer Prize-winner Ira Berkow, and is narrated by actor Dustin Hoffman. It was directed by Peter Miller, a documentary filmmaker known for his previous films, A Class Apart, Sacco and Vanzetti and The Internationale.

Dustin Hoffman does not normally narrate films, and initially turned down the project. However, when he looked at the script, he changed his mind, saying, "Oh, this is about bigotry and overcoming anti-Semitism, about discrimination and these issues that I grew up with, that really matters to me."

The film opens with a clip from the 1980 satirical comedy film Airplane!, in which a flight attendant is asked by a passenger if she has anything light to read. She responds by offering an ultra-thin leaflet, saying, "How about this leaflet, Famous Jewish Sports Legends?".

The stereotype of Jews as non-athletic, as well as anti-semitism, are two issues that many Jewish baseball players faced and had to overcome. Noted anti-semite Henry Ford wrote on May 22, 1920: "If fans wish to know the trouble with American baseball they have it in three words—too much Jew." A number of early Jewish ballplayers changed their names, so that it would not be apparent that they were Jewish.

The movie discusses the key Jewish ballplayers in each decade since baseball started in the 1860s, and how that helped Jews assimilate and counteract the stereotype of Jews as cerebral but non-athletic. The film is partly about Jewish immigration and assimilation into American society; bigotry against Jews; the passing on of Jewish traditions, even during assimilation; heroism; and the breaking of Jewish stereotypes.

Director Miller said:

At its heart, this is a film about overcoming stereotypes. Bigotry against Jews has faded a great deal ...

The story of a once-marginalized people finding their way into the American mainstream offers lessons for a country that continues to grapple with its ideal as a place where talent should overcome prejudice, where we can retain our differences while still being American, where anyone who can hit or pitch or run can be a part of the magic and drama of our national game.

The documentary contains rare archival footage and photos, and music ranging from Benny Goodman to Yo-Yo Ma to Rush.

=== Ballplayers, and interviewees ===
The documentary highlights Al Rosen (Rookie of the Year in 1950, and MVP in 1953), who is frank about how he dealt with anti-Semitism: "There's a time that you let it be known that enough is enough. ... You flatten [them]." It also discusses Moe Berg ("he spoke seven languages, and couldn't hit in any of them"), Lipman Pike (led the National Association in home runs three times), pitcher Barney Pelty (the "Yiddish Curver"), "Subway Sam" Nahem, Moe Solomon ("The Rabbi of Swat") and Shawn Green. Others interviewed include Norm Sherry, Ron Blomberg, Elliott Maddox and Bob Feller. Also featured in the film are Maury Allen, Larry King, Ron Howard and Yogi Berra.

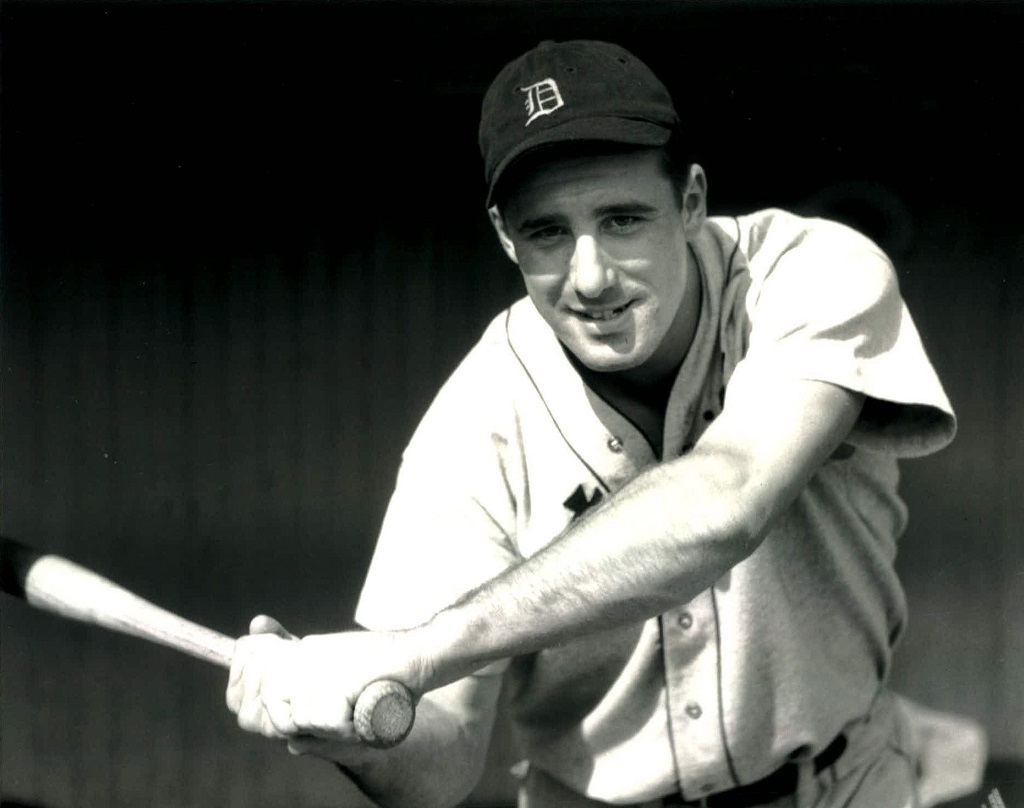
Hall of Famers Hank Greenberg of the Tigers (left) and Sandy Koufax of the Dodgers (right)

The documentary especially focuses on two players. One is Hank Greenberg, a two-time American League MVP, five-time All Star, and Hall of Famer. Anti-Semitic barbs directed at him from the stands served to motivate him, he said. He sat out Yom Kippur during a tight pennant race on the advice of his mother. The film notes a column in the Detroit Free Press, in which Edgar Guest wrote, in response to Greenberg's absence from the lineup, "We shall miss him on the infield, and shall miss him at the bat, but he's true to his religion and we honor him for that."

The other is Sandy Koufax, Hall of Fame pitcher, three-time Cy Young Award winner, and 7-time All Star, who sat out Game 1 of the 1965 World Series to observe Yom Kippur, out of respect of his heritage. Koufax had never pitched on any of the High Holy Days in his career, and chose not to during Game 1. In his place, Don Drysdale started and was hit hard; when Dodgers manager Walter Alston arrived at the mound to take him out of the game, Drysdale quipped, "Right now I bet you wish I was Jewish too." Koufax agreed to a rare filmed interview for the documentary.

More recent ballplayers are also discussed, including All Stars Kevin Youkilis, Ian Kinsler and Ryan Braun. Youkilis notes in the film:

It's something that I probably won't realize until my career is over, how many people are really rooting for me and cheering for me. And it's not just because I went 3-for-4, or had a great game. It's just the fact that I represent a lot of Jewish people and a lot of the Jewish heritage and the struggles that a lot of our people have had.

As of 2010, there had been 166 Jewish major leaguers, the newest being Ike Davis with the New York Mets and Danny Valencia with the Minnesota Twins.

== Release ==
Among the film's notable festival appearances and special screenings in 2010 were July 15 and 16 at the Jerusalem Film Festival, July 25 at the Stony Brook Film Festival, July 25 at the San Francisco Jewish Film Festival, July 31, and August 1 and 8 at the San Francisco Jewish Film Festival, August 10–15 at the Rhode Island International Film Festival, October 3 at the Baseball Hall of Fame, and October 14 and 16 at the Jacksonville Film Festival. It was the opening-night film at the Atlanta Jewish Film Festival February 8, 2011, playing for an audience of more than 3,000 at Atlanta's Fox Theatre. It was theatrically released in New York, Los Angeles and a number of other cities. The DVD was released by New Video April 19, 2011.

== Reception ==
=== Critical response ===
Kenneth Turan of The Los Angeles Times, describing it as "warm and enthusiastic", wrote that the documentary "not only lives up to its title ... but also delivers a bit extra as well".

John Anderson wrote in Variety, "With terrific narration by Dustin Hoffman, Jews and Baseball makes effective use of archival footage and interviews, the most spectacular of which is a lengthy sequence featuring the usually reclusive Koufax."

Andrew Schenker of Time Out New York described it as "a breezy compendium of fun facts and colorful figures... likely to prove irresistible to baseball fans, Hebraic or otherwise".

Newsday described it as "stirring, revelatory and affectionate. Jews and Baseball knocks it out of the park."

Mark Dawidziak wrote in The Plain Dealer that it is "an engaging, briskly paced film".

=== Awards ===
The film received the Best Editing Award at the Breckenridge Film Festival, recognizing the work of film editor Amy Linton, the Audience Choice Award at the 2011 Greater Phoenix Jewish Film Festival, and the Audience Choice Award for Best Feature Documentary at the 2011 Seattle Jewish Film Festival.

== See also ==
- List of baseball films
- List of Jewish Major League Baseball players
- Jewish Sports Review
- National Jewish Sports Hall of Fame and Museum
