= Al Rosen =

American baseball player (1924–2015)

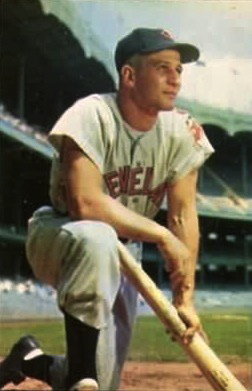
- Al Rosen, circa 1953
- Third baseman
- Born: February 29, 1924; Spartanburg, South Carolina, U.S.
- Died: March 13, 2015 (aged 91); Rancho Mirage, California, U.S.
- Batted: Right Threw: Right

MLB debut
- September 10, 1947, for the Cleveland Indians

Last MLB appearance
- September 30, 1956, for the Cleveland Indians

MLB statistics
- Batting average: .285
- Home runs: 192
- Runs batted in: 717
- Stats at Baseball Reference

Teams
- Cleveland Indians (1947–1956)

Career highlights and awards
- 4× All-Star (1952–1955); World Series champion (1948); AL MVP (1953); 2× AL home run leader (1950, 1953); 2× AL RBI leader (1952, 1953); Cleveland Guardians Hall of Fame

Albert Leonard Rosen (February 29, 1924 – March 13, 2015), nicknamed "Flip" and "the Hebrew Hammer", was an American professional baseball player and executive. He played his entire career in Major League Baseball (MLB) as a third baseman for the Cleveland Indians from 1947 to 1956.

After serving for four years in the U.S. Navy during World War II, Rosen returned to become a stand-out for the Indians on both offense and defense. A four-time All-Star, he was the first rookie to lead the American League in home runs, going on to drive in 100 or more runs for five consecutive years and twice led the league in home runs and twice in runs batted in (RBIs). Rosen was a member of the 1948 World Series winning team, and won the 1953 AL Most Valuable Player Award.

Following two decades as a stockbroker after retirement from baseball, Rosen returned to the game as a top front office executive in the late 1970s, serving the New York Yankees, Houston Astros and San Francisco Giants variously as president, CEO, and general manager. Regarded as an executive who still thought like a player, he became the only former MVP to also earn baseball's Executive of the Year award. He was inducted into the Cleveland Guardians Hall of Fame in 2006.

== Early life ==
Rosen was born in Spartanburg, South Carolina, to Louis and Rose (née Levin) Rosen. His father left the family shortly thereafter, and Rosen's mother and grandmother moved the family to Miami, Florida, when he was 18 months old.

Rosen suffered from asthma as a child, which prompted his family to move further south. While growing up, his two favorite baseball players were Lou Gehrig and Hank Greenberg. He attended Riverside Elementary School, Ada Merritt Junior High School, and then Miami Senior High School for a year before attending Florida Military Academy in St. Petersburg, Florida, on a boxing scholarship. After graduating from Florida Military Academy, Rosen enrolled in the University of Florida in Gainesville, Florida. He left the university after a semester to play minor league baseball in North Carolina.

Rosen enlisted in 1942, and spent four years in the U.S. Navy fighting in the Pacific during World War II, delaying his professional baseball career. He navigated an assault boat in the Battle of Okinawa. He left the Navy as a lieutenant the following year, returning to baseball.

== Minor league career ==
Rosen played for the 1946 Pittsfield Electrics, where he was initially given a back-up role. Upon leading the Canadian–American League in home runs (16) and RBIs (86), while batting .323, however, he was bestowed his idol Hank Greenberg's nickname, "the Hebrew Hammer". Rosen played for the Oklahoma City Indians of the Texas League in 1947, and had one of the finest individual seasons in league history. He led all hitters in average (.349), hits (186), doubles (47), extra-base hits (83), RBIs (141), total bases (330), slugging percentage (.619), and on-base percentage (.437). He won the Texas League Player of the Year Award. Rosen played for the New York Yankees' Kansas City Blues farm team in 1948. He was loaned to the Blues for the duration of the team's American Association season as part of a deal that sent reliever Charley Wensloff from the Yankees to the Indians. Rosen was named Rookie of the Year in the American Association for his play with the Blues.

== Major League Baseball career ==
Rosen made his first appearance in the major leagues in 1947 at age 23. In 1948, Rosen played most of the year in minor leagues with the Kansas City Blues, before joining the Indians in September. He played in the 1948 World Series as a reserve behind regular third baseman Ken Keltner despite only playing five games during the season after the Indians requested his inclusion on the World Series roster. When Keltner was traded in 1950, Rosen took over as the Indians' third baseman, leading the American League in home runs with 37, hitting more than any previous American League rookie. It stood as the AL rookie record until Mark McGwire surpassed it in 1987. He homered in four straight games in June, a feat unmatched by an Indians rookie until Jason Kipnis in 2011. Rosen averaged a league-best homer every 15.0 at bats, and led the league as well in HBP (10). He batted .287 and had 116 runs batted in, while finishing fifth in the league with 100 walks and a .543 slugging percentage. His 100 walks remained a team rookie record for a right-handed batter, through 2014. He also remained the most recent AL rookie to record at least 100 walks until Aaron Judge in 2017. Despite his home run title, he finished 17th in the American League MVP Award voting.

In 1951 Rosen led the league in games played, and was fifth in the league in RBIs (102), extra-base hits (55), and walks (85). He batted .265, with 24 home runs. Rosen hit four grand slams, a team season record that was not broken until Travis Hafner hit five in 2006.

Rosen led the American League with 105 RBIs and 297 total bases in 1952. He also was third in the league in runs (101) and slugging percentage (.524), fifth in hits (171) and doubles (32), sixth in home runs (28), and seventh in batting average (.302). On April 29, he matched the then team record of three home runs in one game, which was surpassed only when Rocky Colavito tied the Major League single-game record with four home runs on June 10, 1959. Rosen came in tenth in the American League MVP Award voting.

In 1953, Rosen led the American League in home runs (43), runs batted in (145), runs (115), slugging percentage (.613), and total bases (367). He also came in second in OBP, and third in hits (201), and tied for eighth in stolen bases. He also had a 20-game hitting streak. Defensively, he had the best range factor of all third basemen in the league (3.32), and led it in assists (338) and double plays (38). His RBI total is still the most for an Indians third baseman, through 2017, and is fourth most for any Indian in a season.

He batted .336, and missed winning the batting title – and with it the Triple Crown – on the last day of the season, by just over one percentage point. He was elected American League MVP by a unanimous vote, the first to be elected unanimously since the original "Hebrew Hammer", Hank Greenberg.

In the 2001 edition of the New Historical Baseball Abstract, Bill James named Rosen's 1953 season the greatest ever by a third baseman. It is ranked 164th overall, and 48th best by a position player by Baseball-Reference.com as of Rosen's passing.

In 1954 he hit an even .300, led the league in sacrifice flies with 11, was fourth in SLG (.506), and fifth in home runs (24), RBI (102), and OBP (.404). He also hit consecutive home runs in the All-Star game despite a broken finger, earning him the game MVP. His five RBI in the game matched the record set by Ted Williams five years earlier, which still stood through the 2011 season.

Hall of Fame manager Casey Stengel said of him: "That young feller, that feller's a ball player. He'll give you the works every time. Gets all the hits, gives you the hard tag in the field. That feller's a real competitor, you bet your sweet curse life." Cleveland won the pennant, but lost the World Series. In spite of Rosen's 5th straight year with 100 or more RBIs Cleveland cut his $42,500 ($509,500 today) salary to $37,500 ($450,700 today) for 1955.

In 1955 Rosen finished in the top ten in the league in at-bats per home run, walks, and sacrifice flies. Rosen appeared on the cover of Sports Illustrated in 1955. By 1956, back problems and leg injuries caught up with Rosen and he retired at age 32 at the end of the season.

== After baseball ==
After retiring in 1956 Rosen pursued a career as a stockbroker, an occupation he held for the next 22 years.

In 1973, Rosen left investments for Caesars Palace in Las Vegas, where he worked for five years.

== Baseball executive ==
In 1978, Rosen became president and CEO of the New York Yankees. They won the 1978 World Series, but Rosen quit on July 19, 1979. Tommy John thought he left because owner George Steinbrenner had replaced Bob Lemon, a friend of Rosen's, with Billy Martin as the team manager a month before. The two had made a pact to stick together against Steinbrenner (rather than have a Rosen serve as a go-between for feuds) by the mid-summer of 1978, but the combination of Martin's resignation later that year and subsequent return made it impossible for Rosen to continue; the final straw was when Rosen wanted a game to start earlier to accommodate a national telecast, but Steinbrenner sided with Martin, who wanted it to start on time. Rosen served as a supervisor of credit operations at Bally's in Atlantic City before a loan going sour led to him resigning.

Rosen then served as team president and general manager of the Houston Astros (1980–1985). Rosen was hired two weeks after the 1980 season ended for the Astros by owner John McMullen, who in a controversial decision had fired Tal Smith despite forming a core that won the National League West title. From 1981 to 1985, the Astros went 386–372 with one playoff appearance [1981 NLDS] before a mutual agreement was reached by both as Rosen departed in September 1985.

He was hired as president and general manager by Bob Lurie of the San Francisco Giants a week after he left the Astros, where he would serve until 1992. Notably, one of his first actions was to remove the television and stereo systems from Candlestick Park as a means to have the players totally focused on baseball. Roger Craig was retained as manager after taking over for Jim Davenport in September, complete with Rosen allowing Craig full control. Through acquisitions (such as Rick Reuschel) and promoting draft picks such as Will Clark, Rosen and his maneuvering brought San Francisco from last place in 1985 to the NL West title in 1987 and the National League pennant in 1989, earning him the National League Executive of the Year honors. Regarded as a GM who still thought like a player, he became the only MVP in history to also earn the top executive award. The Giants went 589–475 with Rosen as general manager. An announcement of the sale of the team by Lurie in June 1992 (which was bought by Peter Magowan in January 1993 after a scuttled sale to Florida investors) precluded the departure of Rosen, who resigned in late November 1992. He was replaced by Bob Quinn. Quinn fired Craig as manager the following month. To replace him, Quinn named Dusty Baker as manager; Rosen had hired him to serve as first base coach of the Giants in 1988 after telling him he would be better suited for the role rather than assistant general manager.

In 1979, Rosen appeared with Spec Richardson (general manager of the San Francisco Giants) in a television commercial entitled "Baseball Executives" for Miller Lite, as one of the commercials in the legendary "Great Taste, Less Filling" advertising campaign. The idea was two major league high-level baseball executives are discussing a big trade in a formal, stuffy members only club, only to reveal that they are actually trading baseball cards much like a couple of children, ending on a throw-down of a bunch of baseball cards on the polished wooden table. The commercial ran heavily during the summer of 1979 along with every game of the World Series that year.

== Personal life ==
Rosen's wife of 19 years, the former Teresa Ann Blumberg, died on May 3, 1971. He remarried to second wife, Rita (née Kallman) several years later. He had three sons, and a stepson and stepdaughter. Rosen occasionally consulted for baseball teams, including a stint with the Yankees as special assistant to the general manager in 2001 and 2002. He was featured in the 2010 movie narrated by Dustin Hoffman, Jews and Baseball: An American Love Story.

Rosen died on March 13, 2015, in Rancho Mirage, California.

== Jewish heritage ==
Rosen was Jewish. He was tough, an amateur boxer, and had a reputation for standing up to anyone who dared insult his ancestry. While some reports have him commenting that, as a minor leaguer, he wished his name were something less obviously Jewish, he is later known to have remarked that he wished it were more Jewish—something like Rosenstein. When Ed Sullivan, himself a Catholic with a Jewish wife, suggested that Rosen might be Catholic, pointing to his habit of drawing a "cross" in the dirt with his bat, Rosen said the mark was an "x" and told Sullivan he wished his name were more Jewish so he wouldn't be mistaken for Catholic.

Once a White Sox opponent called him a "Jew bastard". Sox pitcher Saul Rogovin, also Jewish, remembered an angry Rosen striding belligerently to the dugout and challenging the "son of a bitch" to a fight. The player backed down.

Rosen challenged another opposing player who had "slurred [his] religion" to fight him under the stands. And during a game, when Red Sox bench player Matt Batts taunted Rosen with antisemitic names, Rosen called time and left his position on the field to confront Batts. Hank Greenberg recalled that Rosen "want[ed] to go into the stands and murder" fans who hurled antisemitic insults at him.

A 2010 documentary, Jews and Baseball: An American Love Story, highlighted Rosen, who in it is frank about how he dealt with antisemitism: "There's a time that you let it be known that enough is enough. ... You flatten [them]."

== Awards ==
- Member of the Cleveland Indians Hall of Fame (2006).
- Member of the National Jewish Sports Hall of Fame (1980).
- Member of the International Jewish Sports Hall of Fame.
- Member of the Texas League Hall of Fame (2005).

== See also ==
- Cleveland Indians all-time roster
- List of Florida Gators baseball players
- List of New York Yankees owners and executives
- List of Jewish Major League Baseball players
- List of Major League Baseball players who spent their entire career with one franchise

Awards
Preceded by Frank Cashen	Sporting News Major League Baseball Executive of the Year; 1987	Succeeded by Fred Claire
