= Ira Berkow =

American sportswriter (born 1940)

- Born: January 7, 1940 (age 86); Chicago, Illinois, U.S.
- Education: Miami University (B.A.); Northwestern University (M.A.)
- Occupations: Sportswriter, Biographer
- Spouse: Dolly Berkow

Ira Berkow (born January 7, 1940) is an American sports reporter, columnist, and writer. He shared the 2001 Pulitzer Prize for National Reporting, which was awarded to the staff of The New York Times for their series How Race Is Lived in America.

== Life ==
Berkow earned his BA in English Literature at Miami University, and his MA from the Medill School of Journalism, Northwestern University.

He was a reporter for the Minneapolis Tribune, a syndicated features writer, sports and general columnist, and sports editor for the Newspaper Enterprise Association.

From 1981 to 2007 he was a sports reporter and columnist for The New York Times and has written for Esquire, The New York Times Magazine, Art News, Seventeen, Chicago Magazine, The Chicago Tribune Magazine, National Strategic Forum Review, Reader's Digest, and Sports Illustrated, among others.

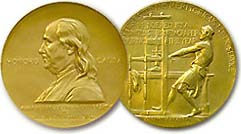
Pulitzer Prize

He shared the 2001 Pulitzer Prize for National Reporting for his article "The Minority Quarterback" in The New York Times series How Race Is Lived in America. His work has been reprinted or cited over six decades in the annual anthologies Best Sports Stories and its successor Best American Sports Writing, and a column of his was included in Best American Sports Writing of the Century (1999). The novelist Scott Turow wrote, "Ira Berkow is one of the great American writers, without limitation to the field of sports."

He was also a finalist for the Pulitzer Prize in 1988, "For thoughtful commentary on the sports scene."

In 2006, he was inducted into the International Jewish Sports Hall of Fame. He holds an honorary doctorate degree from Roosevelt University (Chicago), 2009.

Berkow is the author of 26 books including the Edgar Allan Poe Award nominated non-fiction The Man Who Robbed The Pierre: The Story of Bobby Comfort and the Biggest Hotel Robbery Ever.

== Works ==
=== Books ===
- To the Hoop The Seasons of a Basketball Life, Sports Publishing, 2025, ISBN 978-1-6835-8511-4; Basic Books, 1997.
- Baseball's Best Ever: A Half Century of Covering Hall of Famers, Sports Publishing, 2022.
- How Life Imitates Sports: A Sportswriter Recounts, Relives, and Reckons with 50 Years on the Sports Beat, Sports Publishing, 2022, ISBN 978-1-6835-8379-0.
- It Happens Every Spring: DiMaggio, Mays, the Splendid Splinter, and a Lifetime at the Ballpark, Triumph Books, 2017, ISBN 978-1-6293-7318-8
- Giants Among Men: Y.A., L.T., the Big Tuna, and Other New York Giants Stories, Triumph Books, 2015, ISBN 978-1-6293-7046-0
- Counterpunch: Ali, Tyson, the Brown Bomber, and Other Stories of the Boxing Ring, Triumph Books, 2014, ISBN 978-1-6007-8973-1
- Wrigley Feld: An Oral and Narrative History of the Home of the Chicago Cubs (with Josh Noel), Stewart, Tabori and Chang, 2014.
- Autumns in the Garden: The Coach of Camelot and Other Knicks Stories, Triumph Books, 2013, ISBN 978-1-6007-8866-6
- Summers at Shea: Tom Seaver Loses His Overcoat and Other Mets Stories, Triumph Books, 2013, ISBN 978-1-6007-8775-1
- Summers in the Bronx: Attila the Hun and Other Yankee Stories, Triumph Books, 2009, ISBN 978-1-6007-8392-0
- The Corporal Was a Pitcher: The Courage of Lou Brissie, Triumph Books, 2009, ISBN 978-1-6007-8104-9
- Full Swing; Hits, Runs and Errors in a Writer's Life, Ivan R. Dee Publisher, 2007, ISBN 978-1-56663-755-8
- Red: A Biography of Red Smith, Rockin Steady, University of Nebraska Press, 2007, ISBN 978-0-8032-6040-5
- Full Swing: Hits, Runs and Errors in a Writer's Life, Ivan R. Dee, 2006.
- Court Vision, To The Hoop: The Seasons of a Basketball Life, University of Nebraska Press, 2004, ISBN 978-0-8032-6229-4
- The Minority Quarterback & Other Lives In Sports, I.R. Dee, 2002, ISBN 978-1-56663-422-9
- The Gospel According to Casey, (with Jim Kaplan), St. Martin's Press, 1992, ISBN 978-0-312-06922-3
- Hank Greenberg: Hall-of-Fame Slugger, juvenile, The Jewish Publication Society, 1991
- How to Talk Jewish, by Jackie Mason (with Ira Berkow), St. Martin's Press, 1990
- Hank Greenberg: The Story of My Life, Times Books, 1989, editor ISBN 978-0-8129-1741-3
- Pitchers do Get Lonely, and Other Sports Stories, Atheneum, 1988
- Carew, by Rod Carew (with Ira Berkow), Simon and Schuster, 1979.
- The DuSable Panthers: The Greatest, Blackest, Saddest Team from the Meanest Street in Chicago, 1978
- Maxwell Street, Survival in a Bazaar. Doubleday & Co., 1977, ISBN 0-385-06723-2.
- Beyond the Dream: Occasional Heroes of Sports, (foreword by Red Smith), Atheneum,1975
- Rockin' Steady: A Guide to Basketball and Cool, by Walt "Clyde" Frazier (with Ira Berkow), 1974
- Oscar Robertson: The Golden Year 1964, Prentice-Hall, 1971

=== Film ===
- Jews and Baseball: An American Love Story, 2010 documentary film; writer
- Champions of American Sport, HBO documentary, 1983; film writer
