= Jewish Baseball Museum =

Virtual museum dedicated to Jewish history and involvement in baseball

- Formation: 2016
- Founder: Jeff Aeder
- Headquarters: Chicago, Illinois, U.S.
- Managing editor: Bob Wechsler
- Funding: Donations
- Website: jewishbaseballmuseum.com

The Jewish Baseball Museum is a virtual museum which is dedicated to the preservation of Jewish history in the sport of baseball. It was founded in 2016 by Chicago-based real estate developer and baseball fan Jeff Aeder who was an enthusiastic collector of Jewish baseball memorabilia.

The museum showcases the importance of baseball in the Jewish American community and history and has a vast collection of artifacts that provide a direct connection to the history of the game, including those related to Sandy Koufax and Hank Greenberg, the only two Jewish players in the Baseball Hall of Fame. It also lists every Jewish player who played in Major League Baseball and their biographies, as well as other notable figures in the sport, such as executives and umpires.

The museum is sponsored by both donations from fans and by Milt's Barbecue, a kosher barbecue restaurant in Lake View, Chicago, which was also founded by Aeder. In 2017, a year after the online museum was launched, Aeder founded Milt's Extra Innings, a baseball-themed kosher deli situated next to the restaurant. The deli held a baseball exhibition in which the Museum's collections were on display until it closed in 2019.

== See also ==
- Jews in baseball
