= Al Cohen (umpire) =

American baseball umpire (1928-2013)

- Born: December 31, 1927; Pittsburgh, Pennsylvania, U.S.
- Died: September 7, 2007 (aged 79); Monroeville, Pennsylvania, U.S.
- Occupation: Baseball umpire
- Years active: 1976
- Employer: National League

Alfred Abraham Cohen (December 31, 1927 – September 7, 2007) was an American baseball umpire who briefly worked in the National League in 1976.

Born in Pittsburgh, Pennsylvania, Cohen served in the United States Army as a military police officer from 1946 to 1947. He began to umpire Little League Baseball games in 1959 and slowly began working his way up to high school and then semipro games. In 1976, Cohen became a backup umpire in the National League, appearing in two games.

Cohen is one of five Jewish umpires to have served in Major League Baseball, the others being: Dolly Stark, Al Clark, Al Forman, and Stan Landes.

After his baseball career ended, Cohen worked as the Director of Safety and Security for the school district of North Hills, Pennsylvania.

Cohen married his wife Rita in 1950. He died in Monroeville, Pennsylvania in 2007, aged 79. He was buried in Adath Jeshurun Cemetery in Allison Park, Pennsylvania.

== See also ==
- List of Major League Baseball umpires (disambiguation)
