= Ra'anana =

Ra'anana רעננה
- City

Hebrew transcription(s)
  - ISO 259: Raʿanana
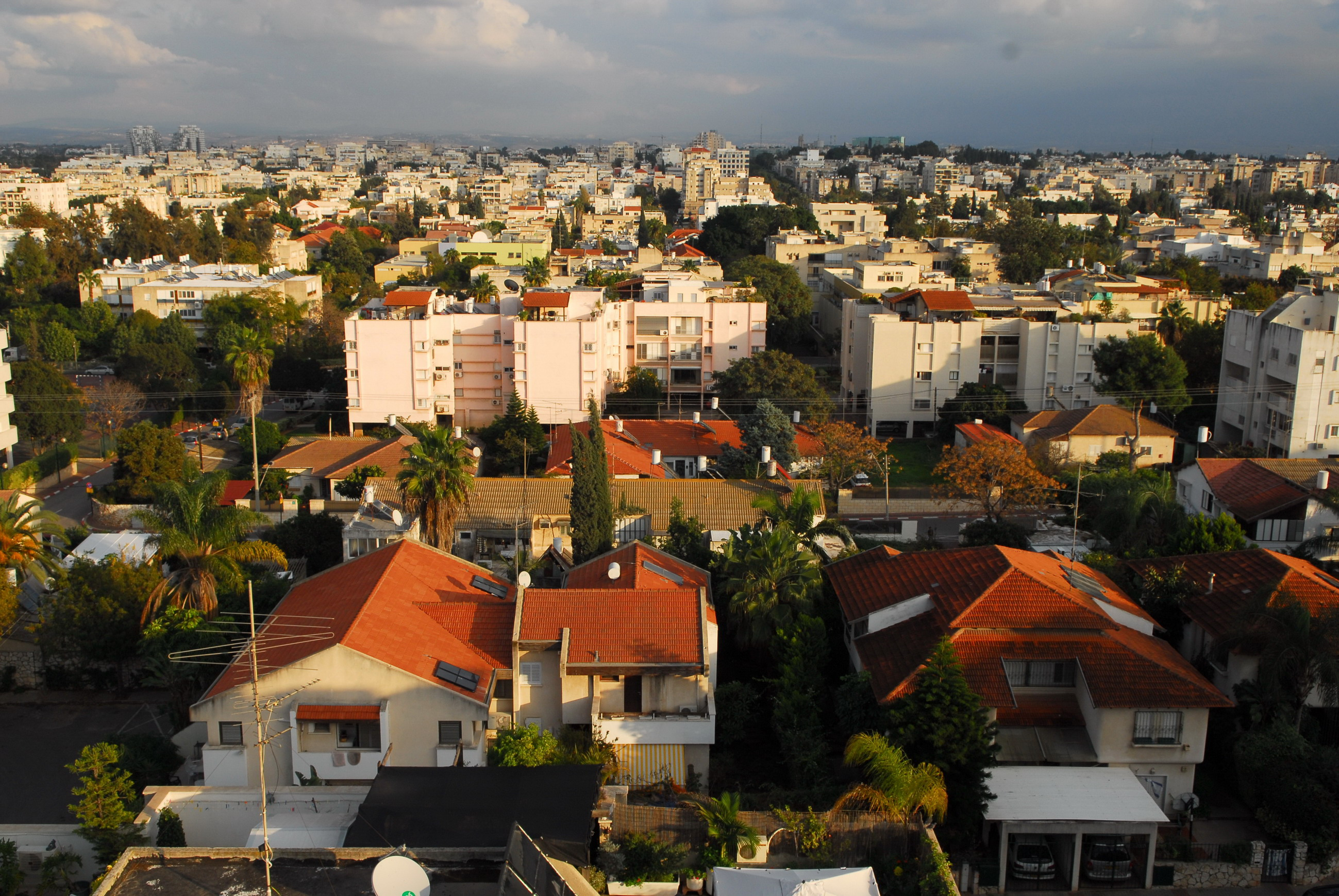
- View of Ra'anana

- Coat of arms

- Location within Central Israel Location within Israel
- Coordinates: 32°11′N 34°52′E
- Country: Israel
- District: Central
- Subdistrict: Petah Tikva
- Natural Region: Southern Sharon
- Founded: 2 April 1922; 104 years ago

Government
  - Mayor: Chaim Broyde

Population (2024)
  - Total: 82,964

Ethnicity
  - Jews and others: 99.9%
  - Arabs: 0.1%
- Name meaning: Fresh
- Website: https://www.raanana.muni.il/Pages/default.aspx

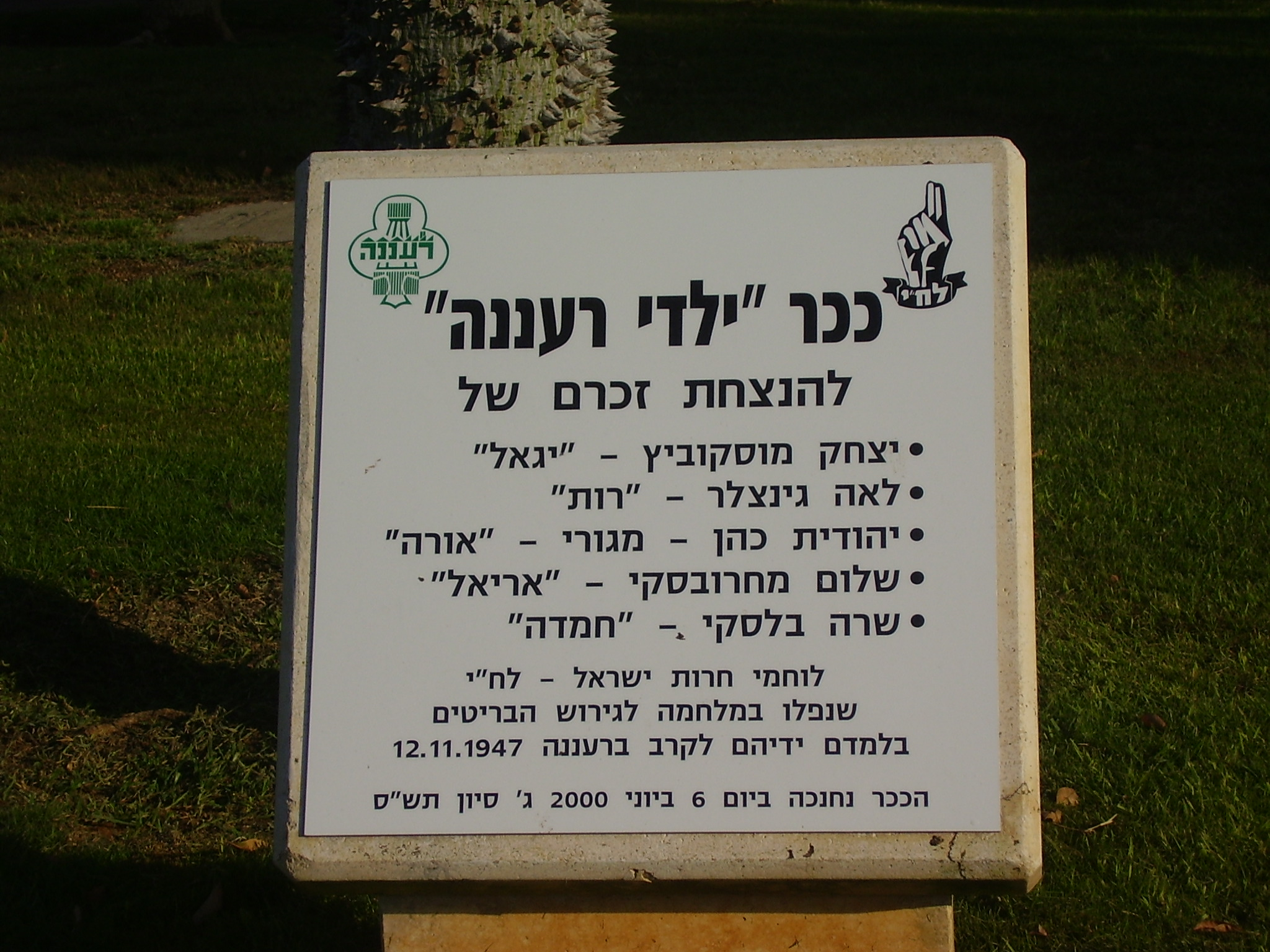
Memorial for Lehi youth a (Militant Group) killed by British in Raanana (1947)

Ra'anana (Hebrew: רעננה, lit. 'Fresh') is an affluent city in the southern Sharon Plain of the Central District of Israel. It was founded in 1922 as an American-Jewish settlement.

Bordered by Kfar Saba and Hod HaSharon on the east and Herzliya on the southwest, it had a population of 82,964 in 2024. While the majority of its residents are Israeli-born Jews, a large part of the population consists of Jewish immigrants from the Americas, Europe and South Africa.

Ra'anana's industrial park is home to global and local start-up companies. It was designated a "Green City" by the World Health Organization in 2005.

== History ==
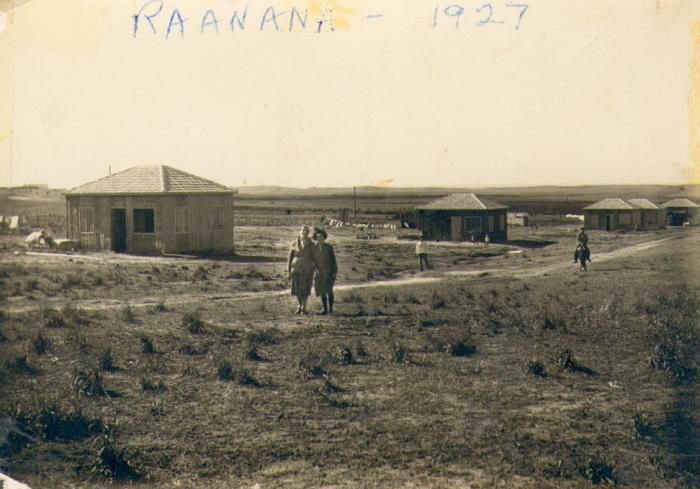
Ahuza Street, Raanana (1927)

Before the 20th century, the location of Ra'anana formed part of the Forest of Sharon, a hallmark of the region's historical landscape. It was an open woodland dominated by Mount Tabor Oak (Quercus ithaburensis), which extended from Kfar Yona in the north to Ra’anana in the south. The local Arab inhabitants traditionally used the area for pasture, firewood and intermittent cultivation. The intensification of settlement and agriculture in the coastal plain during the 19th century led to deforestation and subsequent environmental degradation known from Hebrew sources.

In 1912 the Company for Jewish Settlement in Israel formed the "Ahuza A – New York" group to purchase land in Palestine for agricultural settlement. World War I delayed their plans. On 2 April 1922, four settlers, three laborers and two armed watchmen arrived at the site that became Ra'anana. In its early days, the settlement was called Ahuza A – New York. Local Arabs called it Little America as most of its residents were English speakers and came from New York. Later it was renamed Ra'anania and then Ra'anana.

The settlement was built along a main street, Ahuza Street, and six other streets, three to the north of Ahuza Street and three to the south. Between 1925 and 1927, the Community House, which would house a variety of public institutions, including the secretariat, clinic, synagogue, meeting place for local committee meetings, assembly hall, culture room, school, kindergarten, and post office, was built. According to a census conducted in 1931 by the British Mandate authorities, Ra'anana had a population of 615 inhabitants in 182 houses.

In 1936, it was given local council status. In November 1947 British soldiers attacked a house in Raanana where a Lehi training course for young people was being held and murdered four trainees aged 16–18 and their 19-year-old instructor. In 2000 the city created a memorial called the "Raanana Children's Square" and a monument was erected in 2020.

By 1948, the year of Israel's formation, Ra'anana was a town of 3,000 residents. By the late 1960s, Raanana had a population of 8,500 spanning an area of 15 square kilometres (6 sq mi).

Eitan Ginzburg, acting mayor of Ra'anana in 2018, was Israel's first openly gay mayor.

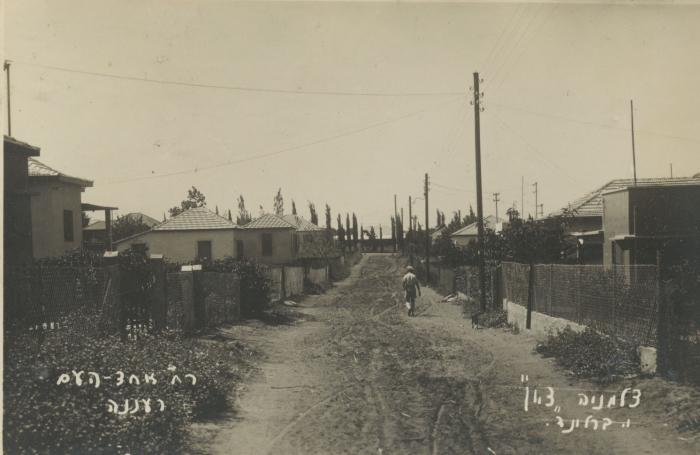
Ra'anana in 1935

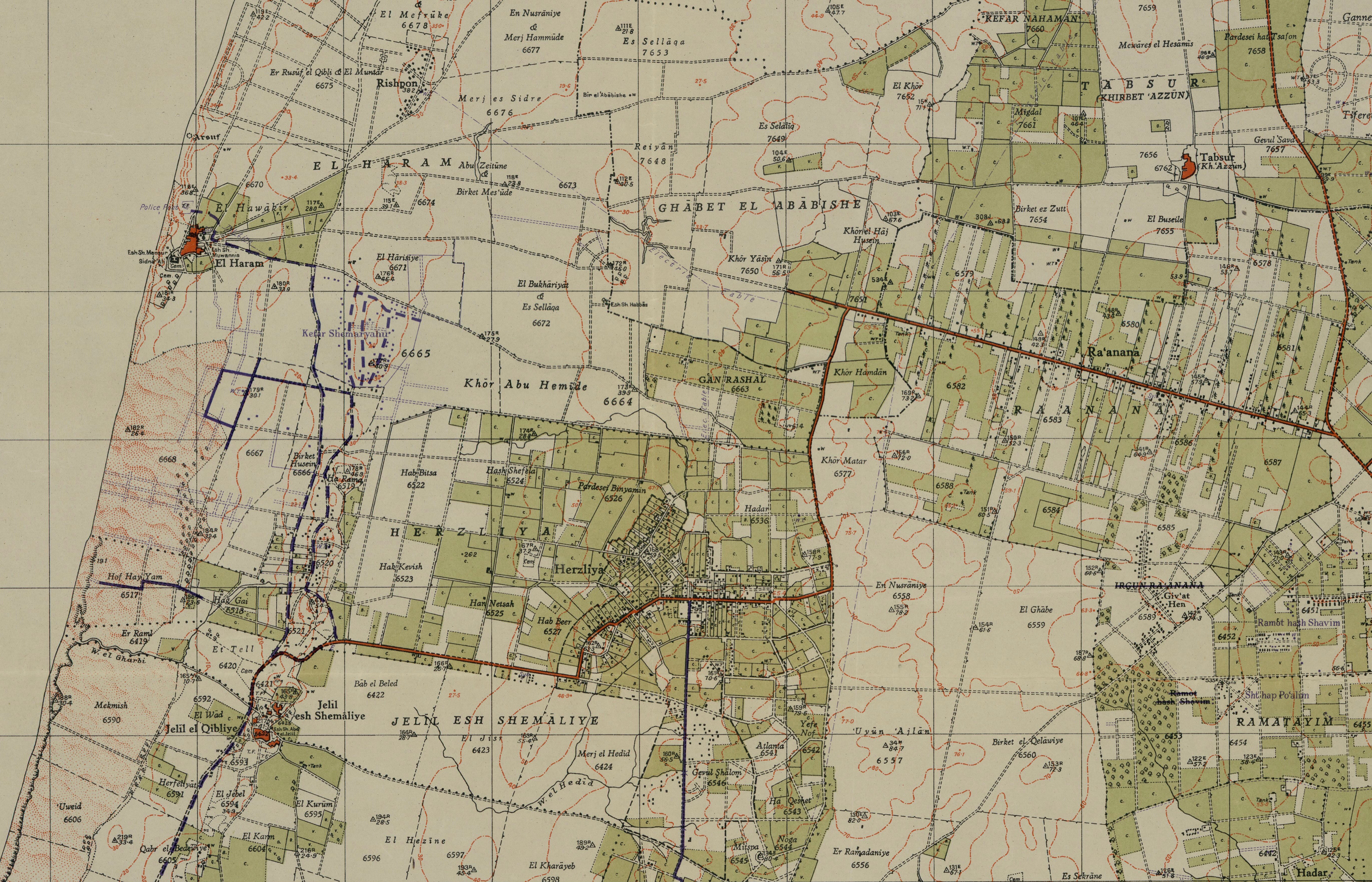
Ra'anana 1942 1:20,000

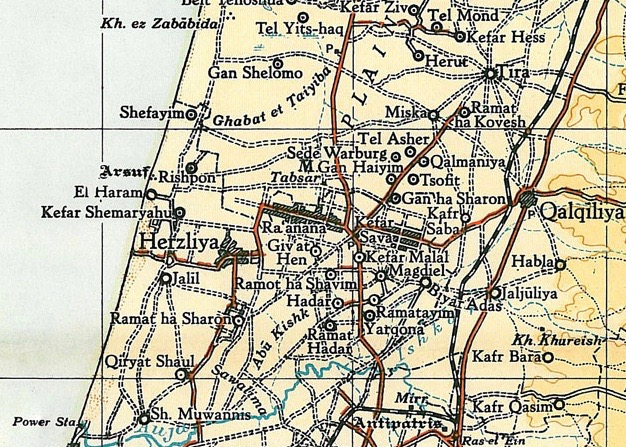
Ra'anana 1945 1:250,000

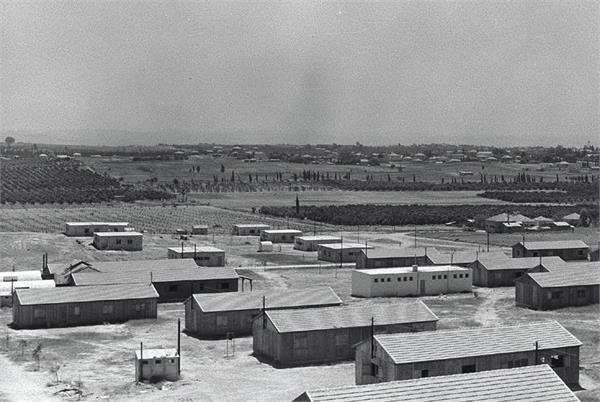
Ra'anana 1947

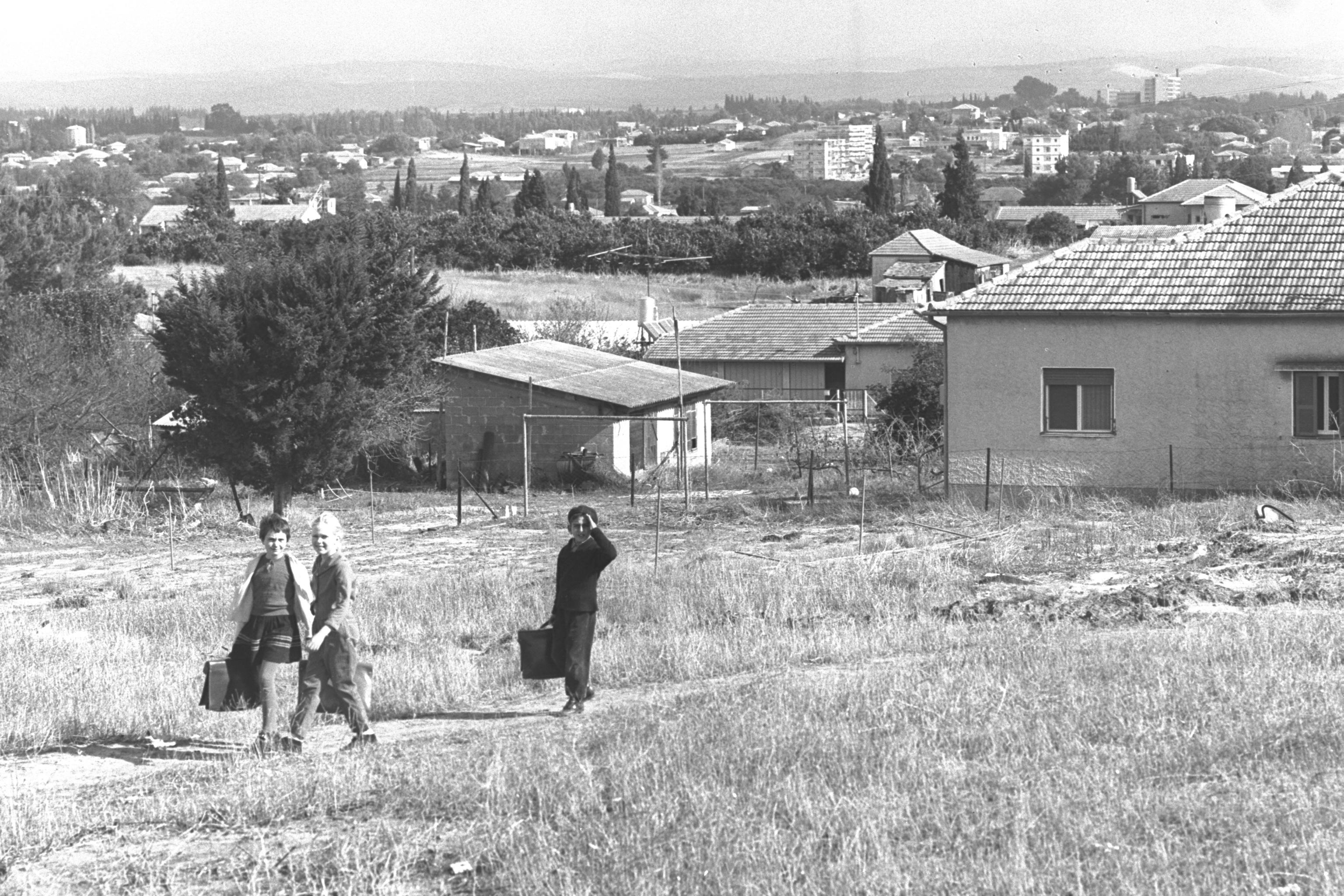
Ra'anana in 1964

=== Car-ramming attack ===
The Ra'anana car-ramming attack was an attack against civilians in Israel that occurred on 15 January 2024 in Ra'anana. The police arrested two Palestinian cousins from Bani Na'im in connection with carrying out the attack.

The attack began when one of the perpetrators stabbed 79 year old Edna Blustein and stole her car. They then began ramming pedestrians with the vehicle, eventually losing control and crashing. The perpetrators took control of another vehicle and continued the attack until finally being stopped.

In addition to Edna Blustein, 17 other people, including children, were injured.

== Local government ==
=== Mayors ===
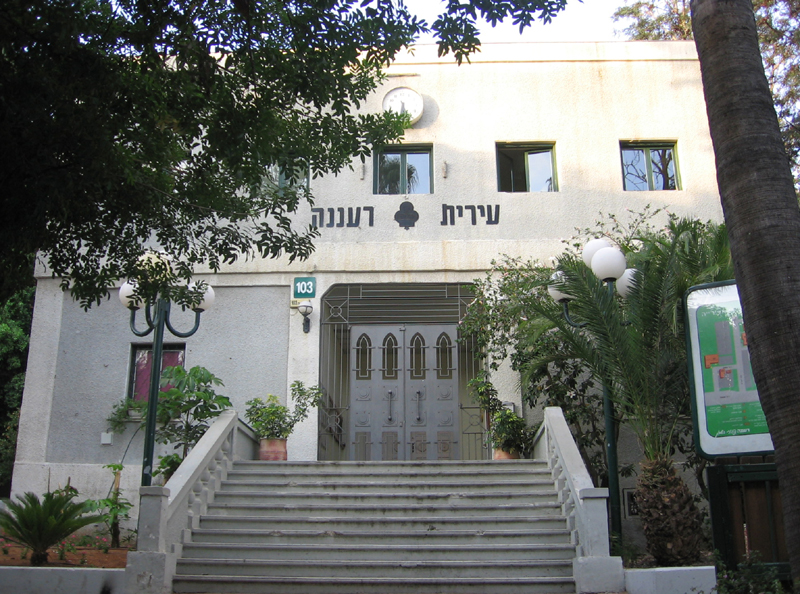
Ra'anana city hall

Mayors have included:

- Baruch Ostrovsky (1931–1955, 1957–1959)
- Ze'ev Bielski (1989–2005)
- Uzi Cohen (2005, interim)
- Ze'ev Bielski (2013–2018, second time)
- Eitan Ginzburg (2018)

== Demographics ==
Year	Population
1972	15,300
1983	38,300
1995	57,500
2008	68,300
2022	80,155
2024	82,963

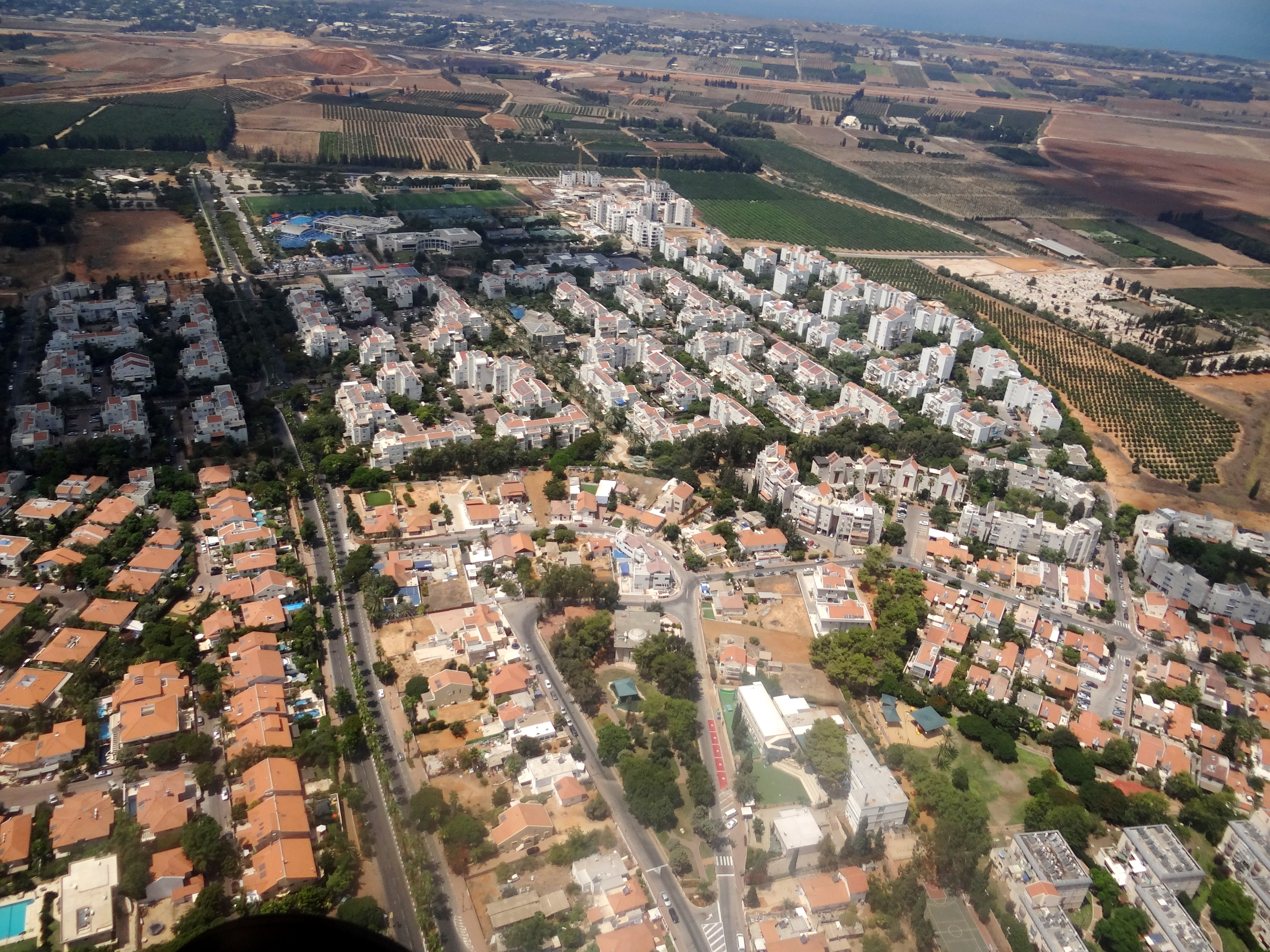
Aerial view of the western neighborhoods of Ra'anana

Ra'anana's population consists mainly of native-born Israelis, but about 22% of the city's residents are immigrants to Israel (Ra'anana is ranked second in immigrant absorption in Israel, after Netanya). It is home to a large number of immigrants from English-speaking countries, a significant number of immigrants from Latin America, mainly Argentina, and also absorbed large numbers of immigrants from the former Soviet Union. In recent years the number of French immigrants is also on the rise.

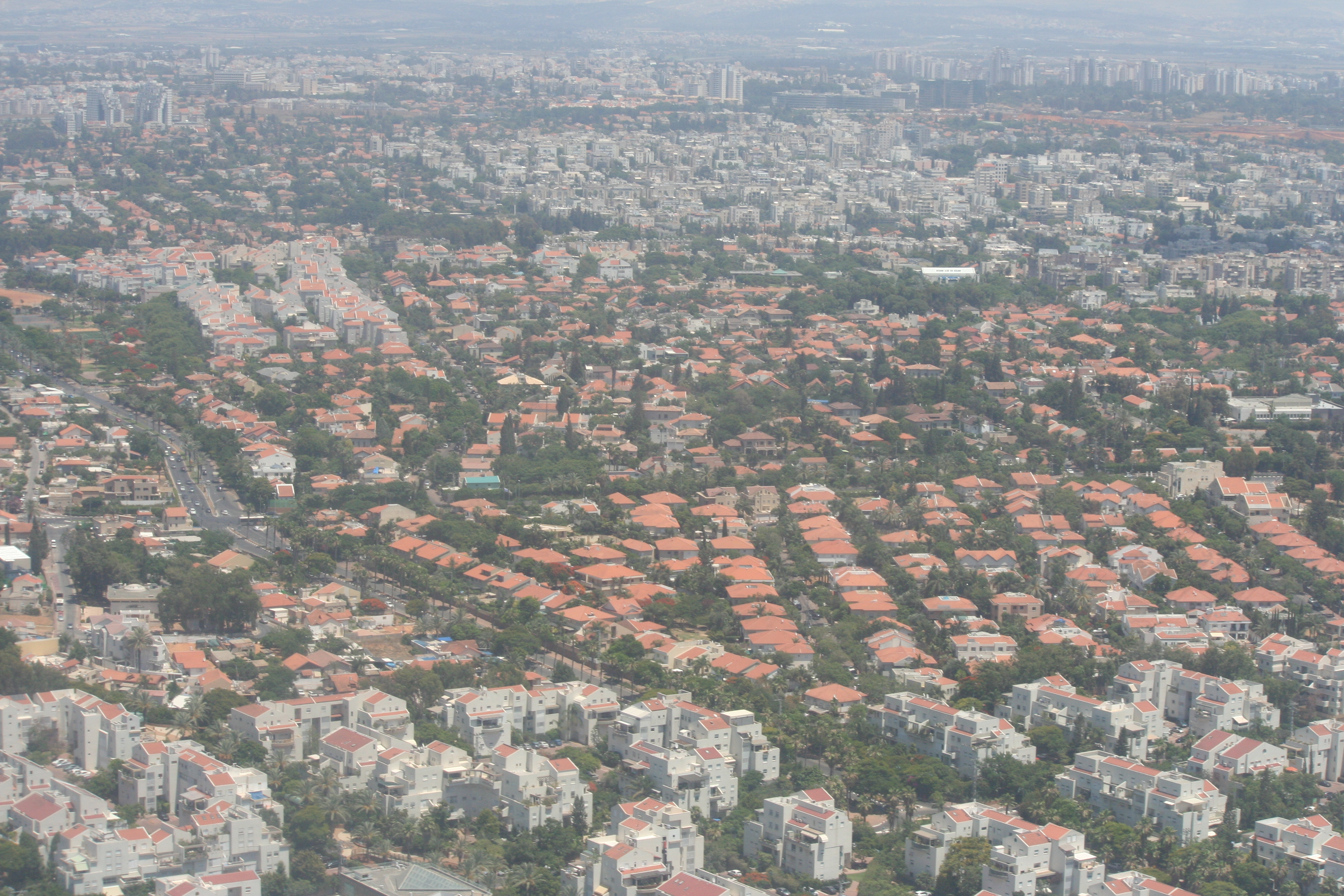
Aerial view of Ra'anana

Though the majority of Ra'anana residents are secular, there is a sizeable religious community, mainly consisting of Modern Orthodox Jews, many of whom are immigrants from the US, UK, South Africa and France. The religious community generally lives on the north side and the secular community on the southern side. There are nearly 100 synagogues in Ra'anana, ranging from small minyanim to large edifices, and including a wide range of traditions, including Reform, Sefaradi, Ashkenazi, Yemenite, Afghani and Libyan synagogues. Many of these synagogues cater to specific immigrant groups. There is also a small Hasidic community of Clevelander Hasidim, led by the Clevelander Rebbe of Ra'anana, Rabbi Yitzchok Rosenbaum. The orthodox chief rabbi of the city is Rabbi Yitzhak Peretz.

== Education ==
Ra'anana is home to the Open University of Israel and Ra'anana College.

== Parks and museums ==
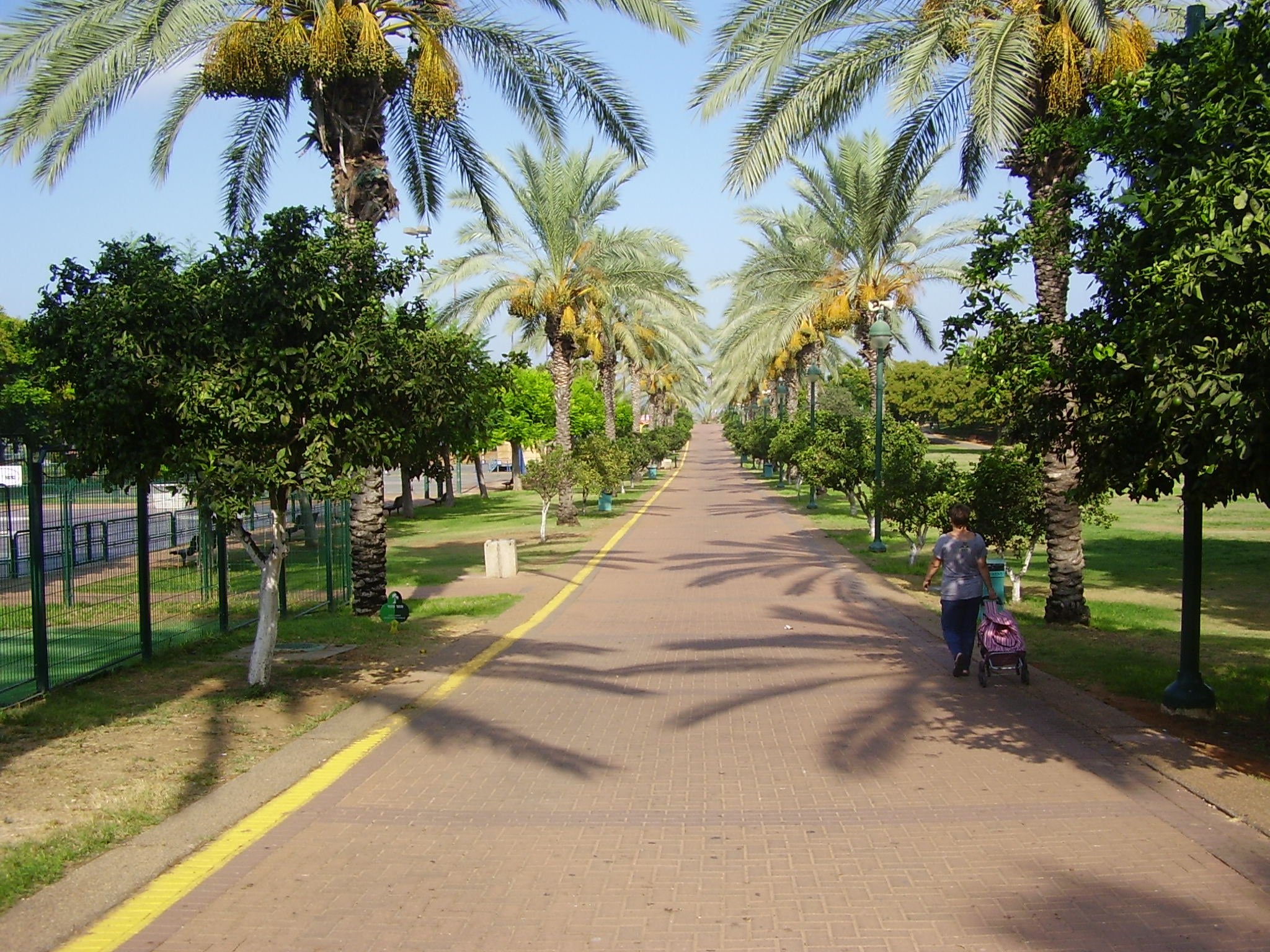
Ra'anana park

Ra'anana Park is the largest urban park in the Sharon region. It offers walking and bike paths, sports fields, a zoo and children's petting corner and a lake in a clover shape reminiscent of Ra'anana's coat of arms. There are two fountains in the lake and pedestrians can cross over it on the bridge. The lake is surrounded by special gardens, including the Seven Species garden, and shaded walking paths. There is also a restaurant and a small art gallery. The Founders Museum presents the story of Ra'anana's original settlers, from the arrival of the Ahuza Alef-New York Association until Ra'anana achieved local council status in 1936.

== Transportation ==
The town is served by Ra'anana South railway station and Ra'anana West railway station.

== Sports ==
The main soccer club of the city is Hapoel Ra'anana. In basketball, the city is represented by Maccabi Ra'anana who play in the National League.

The Ra'anana Roosters are the local rugby team, and the area is a center of rugby union in Israel, with Rugby Israel being based there. With a large population of American expatriates, the Ra'anana Express are an inaugural team in the Israel Baseball League.

== Voting patterns ==
In the 2022 election, 59 percent of voters in Ra'anana voted for the parties of the center-left coalition led by Yair Lapid, while 36 percent voted for the parties of the right-wing coalition led by Benjamin Netanyahu and 0.2 percent voted for the Arab parties.

In the 2026 election, 61 percent of voters in Ra'anana voted for the parties of the center-left coalition led by Gadi Eisenkot, while 32 percent voted for the parties of the right-wing coalition led by Benjamin Netanyahu and 0.2 percent voted for the Arab parties. An additional 3 percent voted for the Reservists, and 2.7 percent voted for Amcha Yisrael. Voter turnout increased 16 percent from the 2022 election.

== Notable people ==
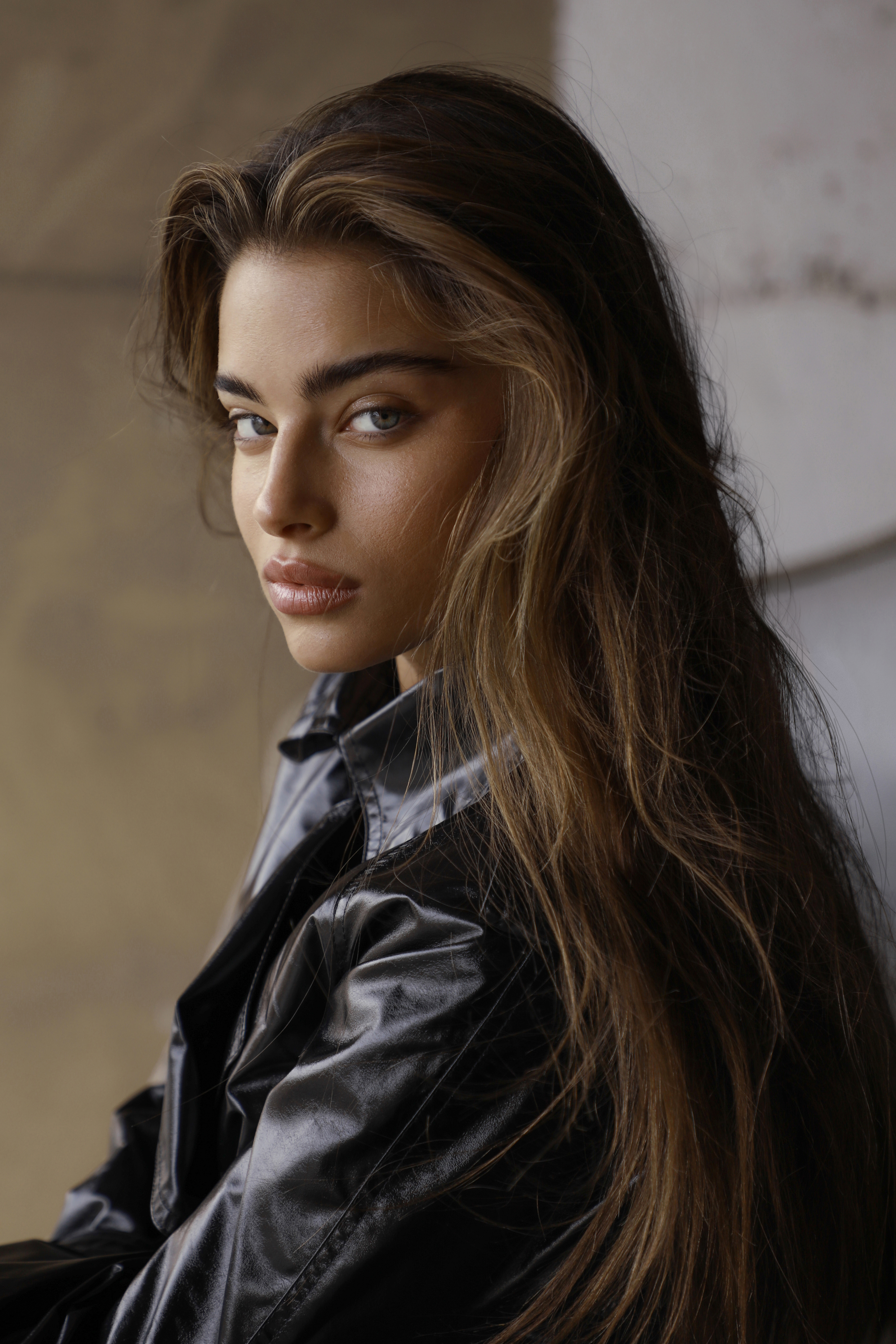
Noa Kirel

- Yitzchak Huberman (1896–1977) Hasidic rabbi, known as "the Tzaddik of Ra'anana"
- Yihye Haybi (1911–1977), photographer
- Haim Hefer (1925–2012), songwriter, poet, and writer
- Israel Gohberg (1928–2009), mathematician
- Paul L. Smith (1936–2012), American-born actor
- Dani Litani (born 1943), musician
- Uzi Landau (born 1943), former politician, former minister
- Rami Bar-Niv (born 1945), concert pianist, composer and author
- Shuli Natan (born 1947), singer
- Tamar Ariav (born 1949), professor of education and President of Beit Berl College
- Raanan Gissin (1949–2023), political scientist
- Eli Vakil (born 1953), clinical neuropsychologist
- Ruhama Raz (born 1955), singer
- Peter Deutsch (born 1957), former US congressman
- S. Fitzgerald Haney (born 1969), former US ambassador and DWTS contestant
- Michelle Cohen Farber (born 1971), the first woman to lead a Daf Yomi class
- Mili Avital (born 1972), actress
- Naftali Bennett (born 1972), politician, former Prime Minister of Israel, former leader of the Yamina party and the Jewish Home parties
- Keren Leibovitch (born 1973), champion paralympic swimmer
- Lidor Yosefi (born 1974), singer
- Roi Klein (1975–2006), major in the Golani Brigade
- Meital Dohan (born 1976), actress and musician
- Yoni Wolf (born 1979), model
- Yehuda Levi (born 1979), actor, model
- Adi Bielski (born 1982), theater and movie actress
- Yael Grobglas (born 1984), actress
- Yotam Halperin (born 1984), basketball player
- Nitzan Hanochi (born 1986), basketball player
- Daniel Maddy-Weitzman (born 1986), baseball player
- Adva Reichman (born 1987), writer and director
- Shachar Sagiv (born 1994), Olympic triathlete
- Yuval Raphael (born 2000), singer and Nova music festival massacre survivor
- Noa Kirel (born 2001), singer, actress, and television host
- Noam Bettan (born 1998), singer, songwriter

== Sister cities ==
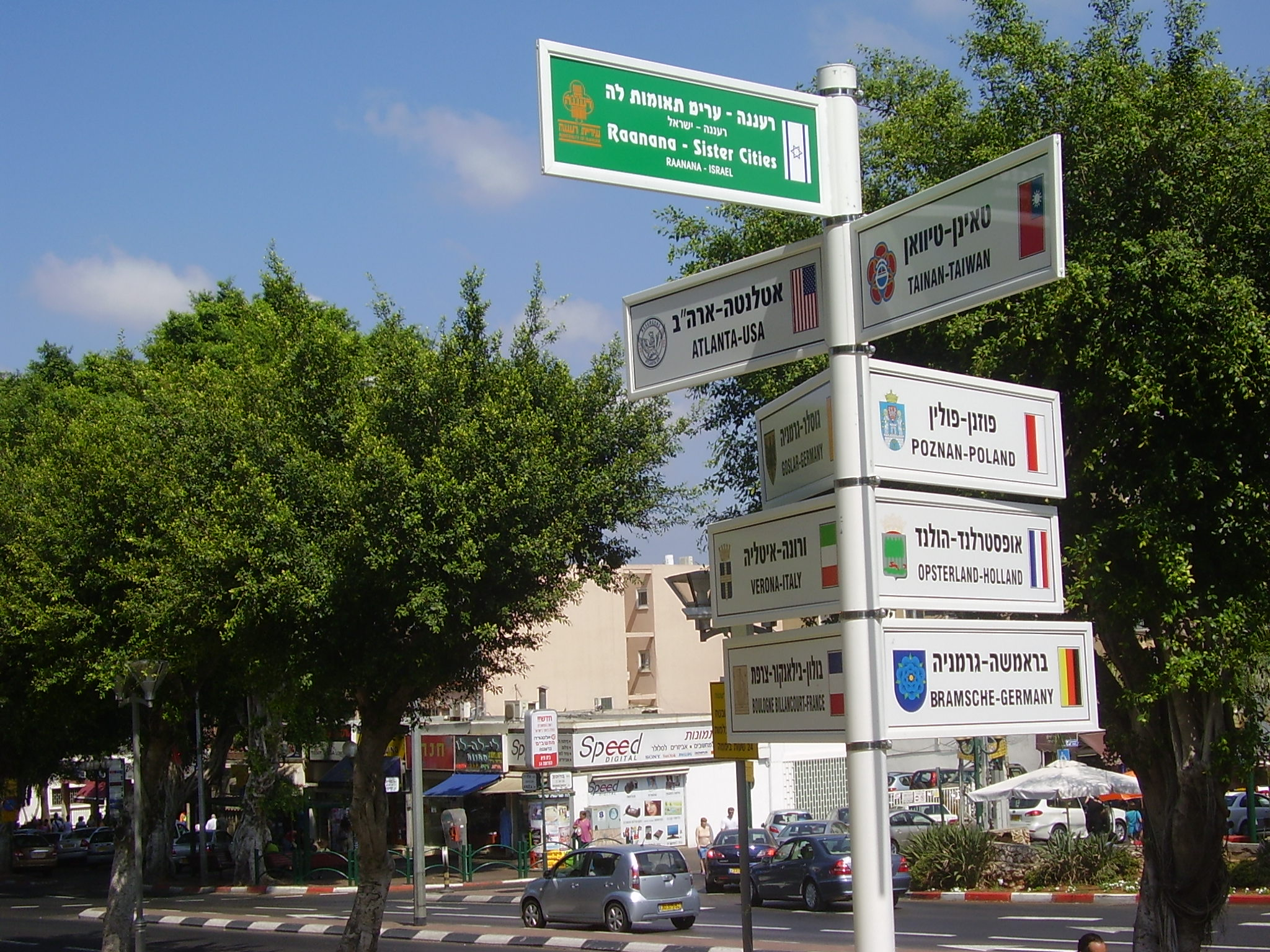
Sign commemorating Ra'anana's twin-sister cities

Ra'anana has sister city agreements with:

Opsterland, Netherlands (since 1963); Bramsche, Germany (since 1978); Boulogne-Billancourt, France (since 1994); Verona, Italy (since 1998); Tainan, Taiwan (since 1999)	Atlanta, United States (since 2001); Goslar, Germany (since 2006); Poznań, Poland (since 2010); Rio de Janeiro, Brazil (since 2021)
