= Lidor Yosefi =

Israeli singer (born 1974)

- Born: March 6, 1974 (age 51)
- Origin: Ra'anana, Israel
- Genres: Mizrahi music
- Years active: 1997–Present

Lidor Yosefi (Hebrew: לידור יוספי; born March 6, 1974) is an Israeli singer.

== Biography ==
Yosef was born Doron Yosef in Ra'anana, Israel. He began his musical career in one of the city's local youth bands. He worked as a keyboardist and composed music for Lior Farhi and Neria Hovev, among others. For his debut album in 1997, he took the name Lidor Yosef, on the advice of his producer, Yossi Ben David. Ben David wrote songs and composed much of Yosef's debut album, Heads Up, including the theme song with the same name. The singer Haim Moshe helped fund the production of the album. The album was a success, and Yosef began working on his second album.

In 1997, Yosef's three-year-old son played with a lighter and caused a fire that killed him. Yosef later divorced his wife. Yosef's second album, Boy You are the World (1998), was dedicated to his deceased son. The album was successful and sold about 40,000 copies. The album includes a duet with the singer Yoav Yitzhak in Seagulls, and with Haim Moshe in Give Me, which became a hit. In Yosef's next album, Everything is Upside Down (1999), he also recorded a duet with Haim Moshe in Tell Me Your Secret. A year later he released the album Feeling Blue (2000), featuring a duet with Michal Amdursky in Two Worlds Together. Both albums did worse than their predecessors in sales, and Yosef entered an hiatus during which he replaced part of his crew.

In 2004, Yosef recorded his sixth album, Want to Fly, which included the song I'm Back. A year later, he released the album Dance with Her Tonight (2005), including the hit song Turned On By You. However, three years passed until the release of Yosef's eighth album, To Love and Smile (2008).

The Jerusalem Post in 2000 called him an "established heartthrob".

== See also ==
- Mizrahi Music
