= Ra'anana Park =

Park in the Central District of Israel

Coordinates: 32°11′14″N 34°50′56″E

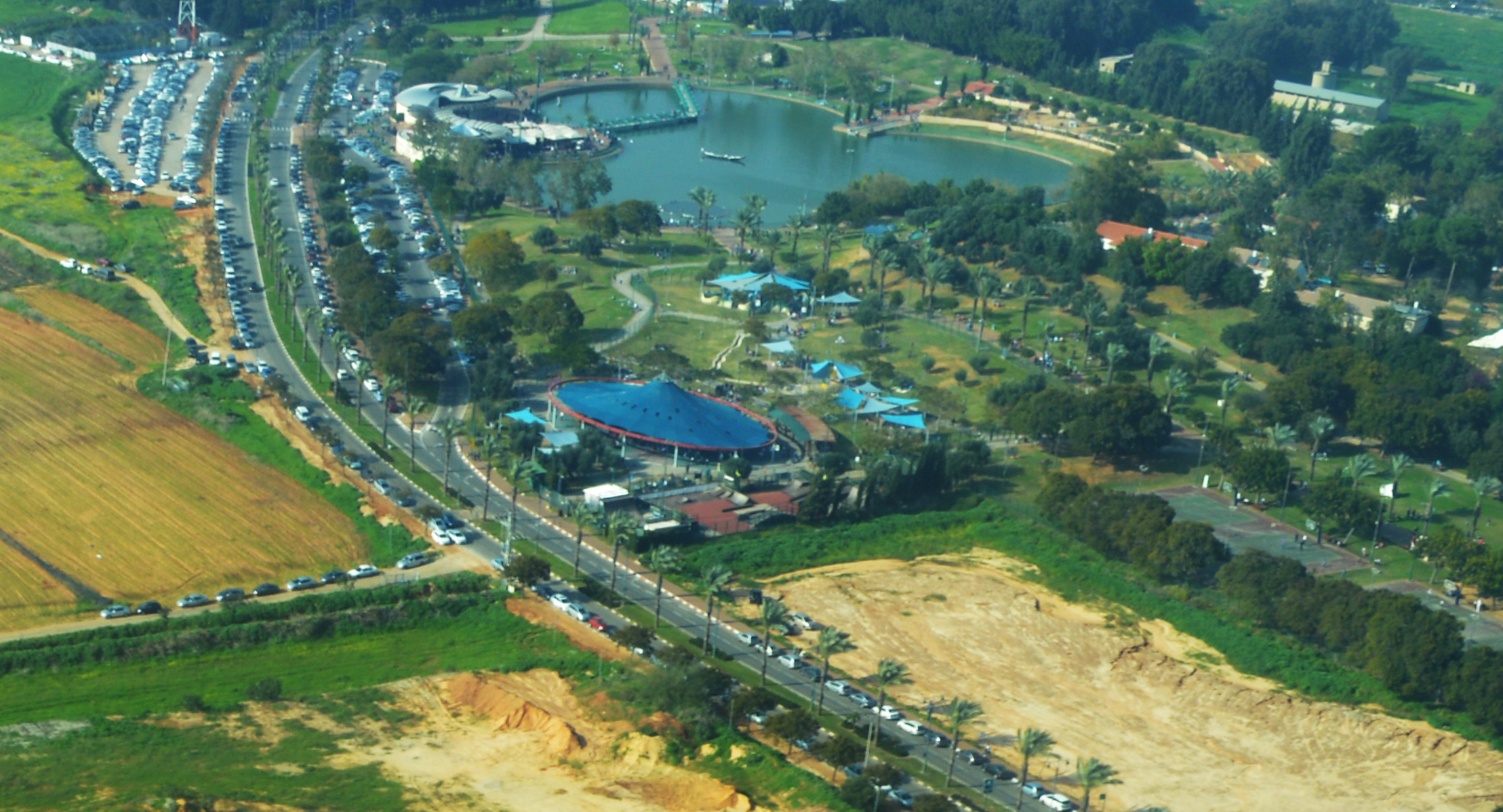

Ra'anana Park is a public park spanning 200 acres, which serves as the central park of the city of Ra'anana, Israel. Nestled at the western edge of Ahuza Street, on the western border of the city, the park adjoins Kfar Batya and the Lev Hapark neighborhood to the north. To the south and west, it borders the fields between Ra'anana and Herzliya.

The park is enclosed from all sides, with entrance facilitated through five gates; two on the east side and three on the west. Inaugurated in 1995, it has undergone various upgrades and expansions since its establishment.

== Structure ==
In the center of the park lies a triangular-shaped lake, reminiscent of the emblem that represents the city. Spanning the lake is a pedestrian bridge. In addition to the bridge, the lake has two fountains. The park offers a variety of relaxation and sports venues, a small zoo, art by Israeli sculptors, an outdoor gym and children's playground, a park with access to those with disabilities, a labyrinth, a garden of the seven fruits and grains mentioned in the Bible and more. The park has 675 fruit and ornamental trees. The park also features a café-restaurant, an art gallery, 2 kilometers (1.2 miles) of walking and biking trails, sports fields, an animal corner, sculptures, a rose garden, a herb garden, and expansive grassy areas. At a high point in the park, the Birdwatch offers panoramic views towards the lake and the southern-western expanses of the park. In the northwestern part of the park, an amphitheater is used to host various cultural performances featuring artists from both Israel and abroad. Many noteworthy acts have performed at this theater such as Backstreet Boys, Avance, Alice Cooper, Lauryn Hill, Tori Amos, Chick Corea, Ian Anderson, Ziggy Marley, The Cranberries, and the Pet Shop Boys.

As part of the park, the 'Friends Park' project operates, constructed through donations from the Shapira family. This project includes facilities designed to accommodate children with accessibility challenges, allowing for more inclusivity within the park. Additionally, joint activities are organized for children from the Shapira family's center and other youth from across the city.

In the past, non-residents were required to pay an entrance fee to the park on Saturdays. However, a legal challenge filed by the Adam, Nature, and Law Association led to its dismissal. Consequently, the Municipalities Law was enacted, stipulating that entrance fees should not be charged, except in exceptional cases to be determined by the Minister of the Interior, with the approval of the Interior and Environment Committee, for the sake of the park's preservation.

After the committee rejected the proposed regulations put forth by the Minister of the Interior, claiming they contradicted an amendment to the law, the collection of entrance fees to public parks across the country, including Ra'anana Park, was effectively prohibited. Surrounding the park, numerous free parking spaces are available for residents of Ra'anana, while non-residents may utilize paid parking facilities.

== Gallery ==
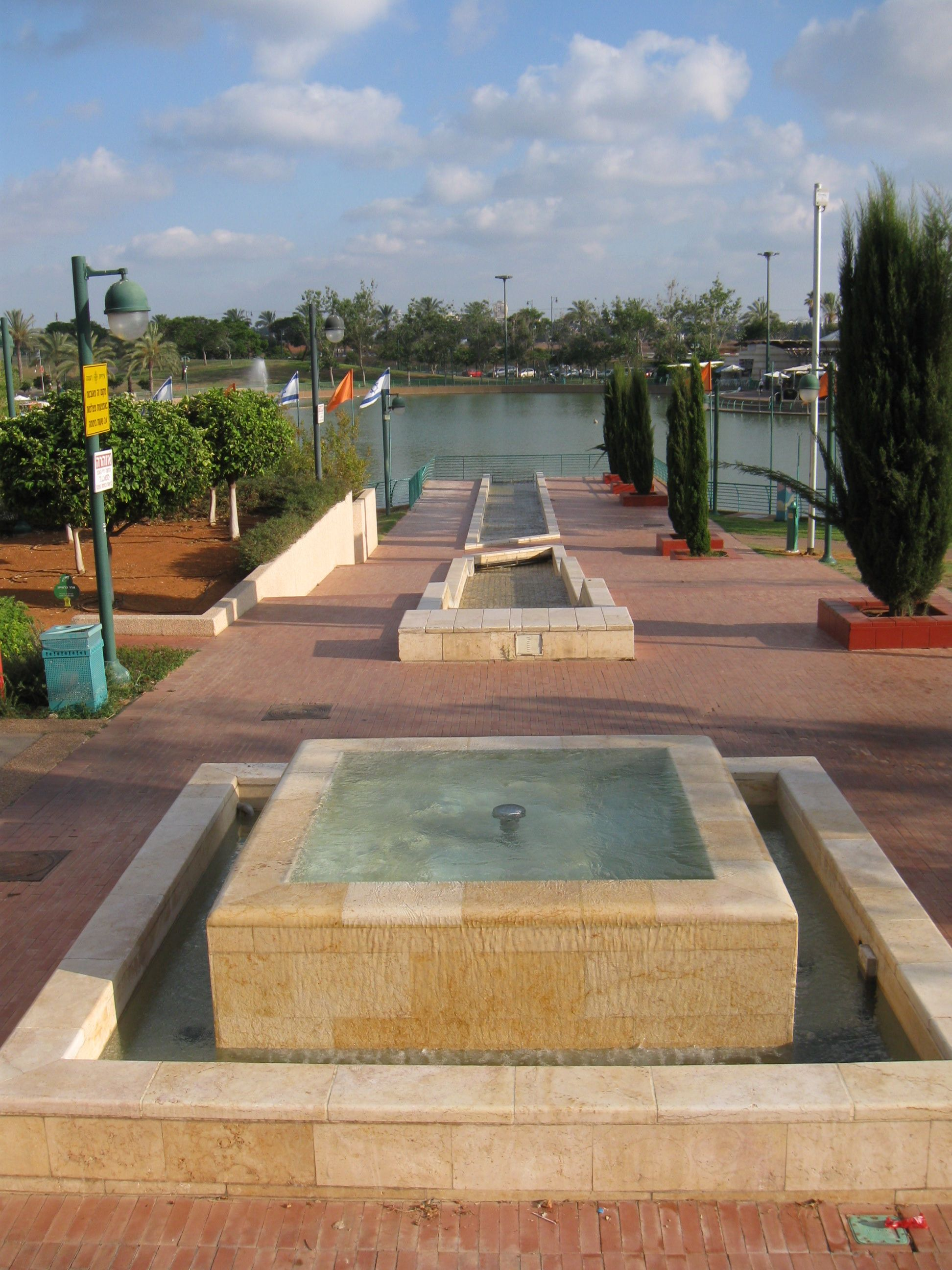

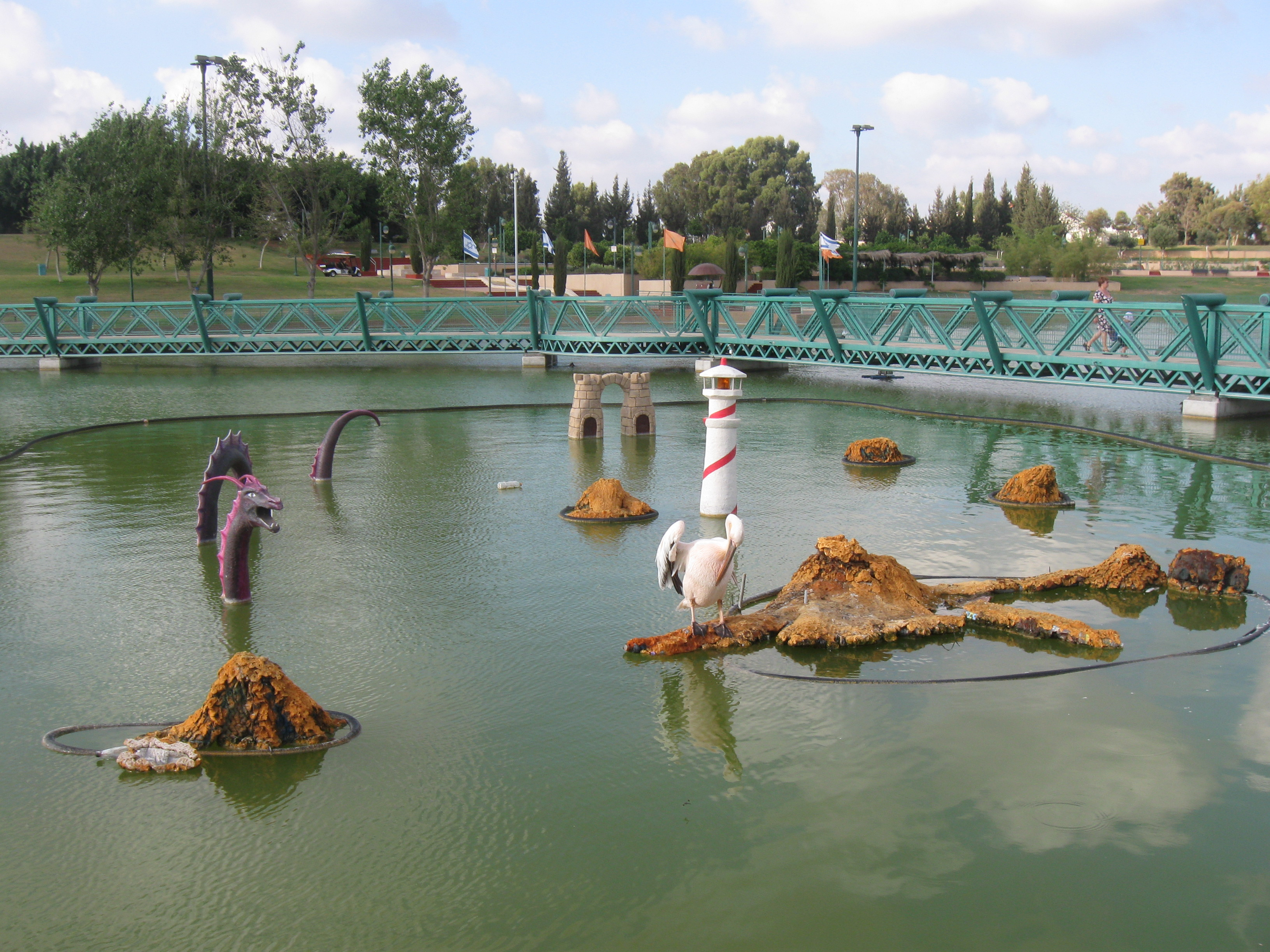
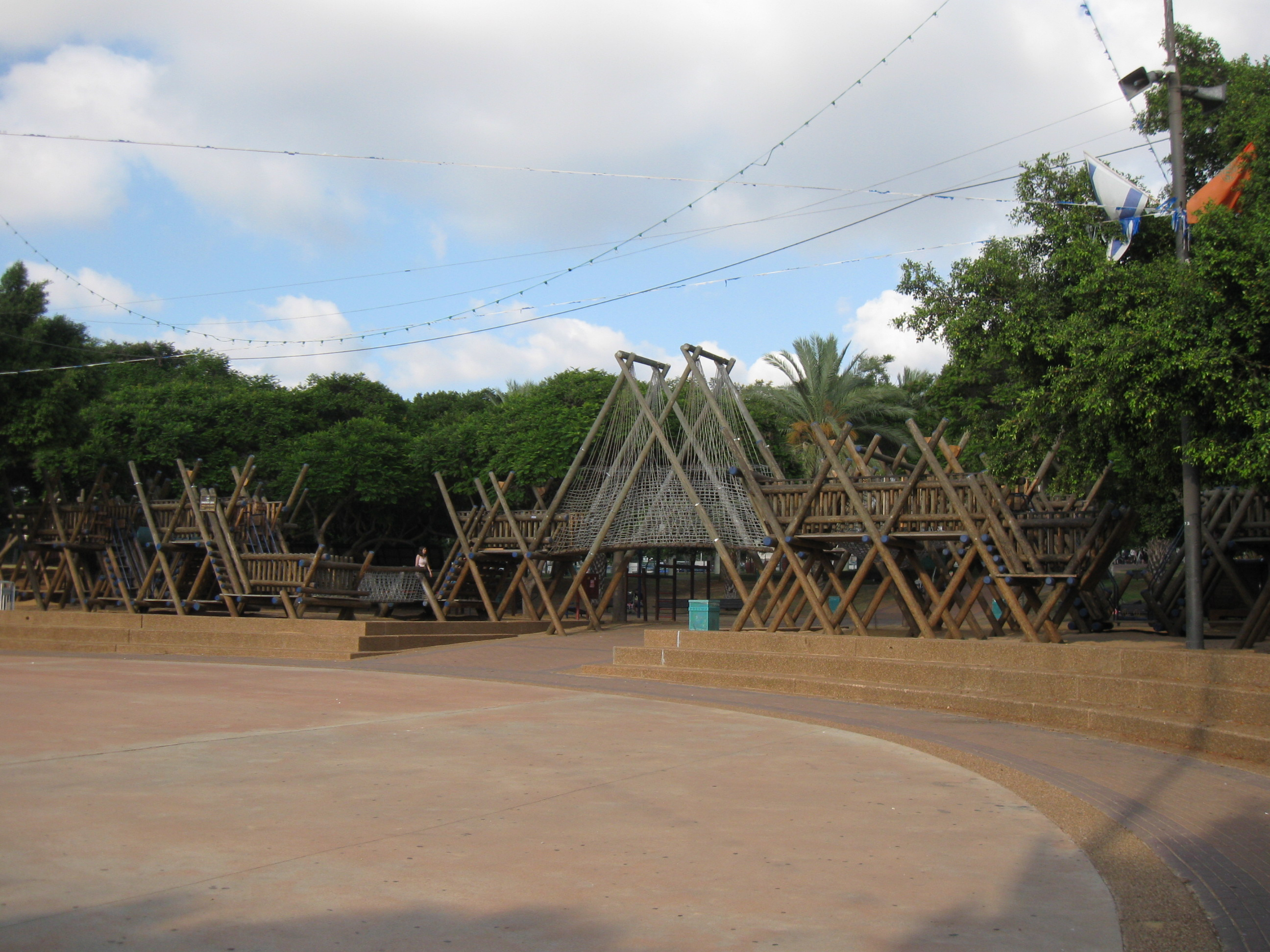

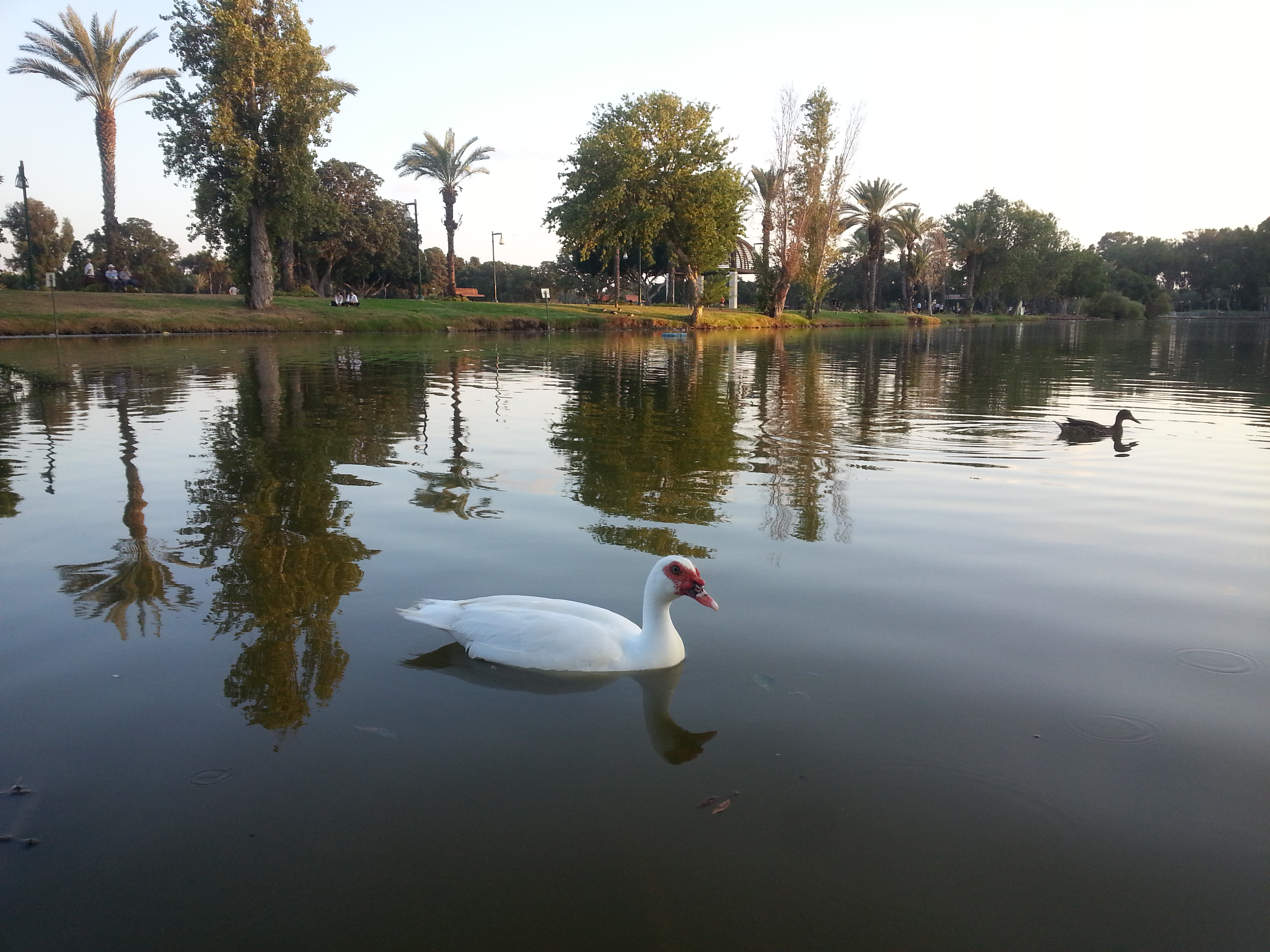
