= List of flag bearers for the Dominican Republic at the Olympics =

Dominican Republic at the Olympics
- Flag of the Dominican Republic
- IOC code: DOM
- NOC: Dominican Republic Olympic Committee
- Website: www.colimdo.org (in Spanish)
- Medals: Gold 4 Silver 5 Bronze 6 Total 15

Summer appearances
- 1964; 1968; 1972; 1976; 1980; 1984; 1988; 1992; 1996; 2000; 2004; 2008; 2012; 2016; 2020; 2024

This is a list of flag bearers who have represented the Dominican Republic at the Olympics.

Flag bearers carry the national flag of their country at the opening ceremony of the Olympic Games.

#	Event year	Season	Flag bearer	Sport	Ref.
1	1964	Summer	Alberto Torres	Athletics	
2	1968	Summer			
3	1972	Summer			
4	1976	Summer	Eleoncio Mercedes	Boxing	
5	1980	Summer	Marisela Peralta	Athletics	
6	1984	Summer	Pedro Nolasco	Boxing	
7	1988	Summer	Juan Núñez	Athletics	
8	1992	Summer	Altagracia Contreras	Judo	
9	1996	Summer	Joan Guzman	Boxing	
10	2000	Summer	Wanda Rijo	Weightlifting	
11	2004	Summer	Francia Jackson	Volleyball	
12	2008	Summer	Félix Sánchez	Athletics	
13	2012	Summer	Gabriel Mercedes	Taekwondo	
14	2016	Summer	Luguelín Santos	Athletics	
15	2020	Summer	Rodrigo Marte	Boxing	
15	2020	Summer	Prisilla Rivera	Volleyball	
16	2024	Summer	Audrys Nin Reyes	Gymnastics	
16	2024	Summer	Marileidy Paulino	Athletics	

== See also ==
- Dominican Republic at the Olympics
