= Dominican Republic at the Olympics =

- Flag of the Dominican Republic
- IOC code: DOM
- NOC: Dominican Republic Olympic Committee
- Website: www.colimdo.org (in Spanish)
- Medals Ranked 75th: Gold 4 Silver 5 Bronze 6 Total 15

Summer appearances
- 1964; 1968; 1972; 1976; 1980; 1984; 1988; 1992; 1996; 2000; 2004; 2008; 2012; 2016; 2020; 2024; 2028

The Dominican Republic first participated in the Summer Olympic Games in 1964, when Alberto Torres de la Mota ("El Gringo" ) participated in the 10th heat of the 100m competition and ran 10.9 seconds, finishing 6th, not qualifying for the next round.

The Dominican Republic has completed in every one of the games since then, but has never participated at the Winter Olympic Games.

The Dominican Republic has won fifteen medals at the Olympics. Pedro Nolasco won a bronze in boxing at the 1984 Summer Olympics and in 2004 Félix Sánchez won a gold in the 400 meter hurdles. In the 2008 Summer Olympics Manuel Felix Diaz won a gold medal in Boxing and Gabriel Mercedes won silver in Taekwondo. At the 2012 Summer Olympics in London, Sanchez once again won a gold medal in the 400 meter hurdles. On the same night, Luguelín Santos won silver in the 400 metres to become the youngest ever Olympic medallist in the event. Luisito Pie won a bronze medal in Taekwondo at the 2016 Olympics in Rio de Janeiro.

At the 2020 Summer Olympics Zacarias Bonnat won the silver medal in the men's 81 kg event, Crismery Santana, won the bronze medal in the women´s 87 kg event, becoming the first Dominican woman to win an Olympic medal. Lidio Andrés Feliz, Marileidy Paulino, Anabel Medina y Alexander Ogando won the silver medal in the mixed 4x400 m relay. Paulino also won a silver medal in the women's 400 metres event, the first woman from the Dominican Republic to earn an individual Olympic medal in athletics. The Dominican baseball team also won bronze at the baseball event. Despite it being their most successful year, they were unable to secure a single gold medal in any event.

They are represented by Dominican Republic Olympic Committee.

== Medal tables ==
=== Medals by Summer Games ===
Games	Athletes	Gold	Silver	Bronze	Total	Rank
1964 Tokyo	1	0	0	0	0	–
1968 Mexico City	20	0	0	0	0	–
1972 Munich	5	0	0	0	0	–
1976 Montreal	10	0	0	0	0	–
1980 Moscow	6	0	0	0	0	–
1984 Los Angeles	19	0	0	1	1	43
1988 Seoul	16	0	0	0	0	–
1992 Barcelona	32	0	0	0	0	–
1996 Atlanta	16	0	0	0	0	–
2000 Sydney	13	0	0	0	0	–
2004 Athens	33	1	0	0	1	54
2008 Beijing	25	1	1	0	2	46
2012 London	35	1	1	0	2	46
2016 Rio de Janeiro	29	0	0	1	1	70
2020 Tokyo	63	0	3	2	5	68
2024 Paris	58	1	0	2	3	59
2028 Los Angeles	future event					
2032 Brisbane	future event					
Total		4	5	6	15	75

=== Medals by sport ===
Sports	Gold	Silver	Bronze	Total	Rank
Athletics	3	3	0	6	49
Boxing	1	0	3	4	44
Weightlifting	0	1	1	2	53
Taekwondo	0	1	1	2	26
Baseball	0	0	1	1	7
Total	4	5	6	15	77

== List of medalists ==
Medal	Name(s)	Games	Sport	Event
Bronze	Pedro Nolasco	1984 Los Angeles	Boxing	Bantamweight
Gold	Félix Sánchez	2004 Athens	Athletics	Men's 400 metre hurdles
Gold	Manuel Felix Diaz	2008 Beijing	Boxing	Light welterweight
Silver	Yulis Gabriel Mercedes	2008 Beijing	Taekwondo	Men's 58 kg
Gold	Félix Sánchez	2012 London	Athletics	Men's 400 m hurdles
Silver	Luguelín Santos	2012 London	Athletics	Men's 400 m
Bronze	Luisito Pie	2016 Rio de Janeiro	Taekwondo	Men's 58 kg
Silver	Zacarías Bonnat	2020 Tokyo	Weightlifting	Men's 81kg
Silver	Anabel Medina; Marileidy Paulino; Lidio Andrés Feliz; Alexander Ogando	2020 Tokyo	Athletics	Mixed 4 × 400 metres relay
Silver	Marileidy Paulino	2020 Tokyo	Athletics	Women 400 metres
Bronze	Crismery Santana	2020 Tokyo	Weightlifting	Women's 87 kg
Bronze	Darío Álvarez; Gabriel Arias; Jairo Asencio; Roldani Baldwin; José Bautista; Emilio Bonifácio; Melky Cabrera; Luis Felipe Castillo; Jumbo Díaz; Juan Francisco; Junior García; Jeison Guzmán; Jhan Mariñez; Erick Mejia; Cristopher Mercedes; Johan Mieses; Gustavo Núñez; Yefri Pérez; Denyi Reyes; Julio Rodríguez; Ramón Rosso; Ángel Sánchez; Raúl Valdés; Charlie Valerio	2020 Tokyo	Baseball	Baseball
Gold	Marileidy Paulino	2024 Paris	Athletics	Women's 400 metres
Bronze	Junior Alcántara	2024 Paris	Boxing	Men's 51 kg
Bronze	Cristian Pinales	2024 Paris	Boxing	Men's 80 kg

== See also ==
- List of flag bearers for the Dominican Republic at the Olympics
- Dominican Republic at the Paralympics
