= Dominican Republic at the 1988 Summer Olympics =

- Flag of the Dominican Republic
- IOC code: DOM
- NOC: Dominican Republic Olympic Committee

in Seoul
- Competitors: 16 (15 men and 1 woman) in 5 sports
- Flag bearer: Juan Núñez
- Medals: Gold 0 Silver 0 Bronze 0 Total 0

Summer Olympics appearances (overview)
- 1964; 1968; 1972; 1976; 1980; 1984; 1988; 1992; 1996; 2000; 2004; 2008; 2012; 2016; 2020; 2024

The Dominican Republic competed at the 1988 Summer Olympics in Seoul, South Korea.

== Competitors ==
The following is the list of number of competitors in the Games.

Sport	Men	Women	Total
Athletics	3	0	3
Boxing	5	–	5
Judo	1	–	1
Table tennis	2	1	3
Weightlifting	4	–	4
Total	15	1	16

== Athletics ==
Men
Track and road events

Athlete	Event	Heat Round 1		Heat Round 2		Semifinal		Final	
Athlete	Event	Time	Rank	Time	Rank	Time	Rank	Time	Rank
Juan Núñez	100 metres	10.47	26 Q	10.33	16 Q	10.35	12	Did not advance	
Evaristo Ortiz	100 metres	11.01	85	Did not advance					
Modesto Castillo	110 metres hurdles	14.40	29 Q	14.21	23	Did not advance			

== Boxing ==
Athlete	Event	Round of 64	Round of 32	Round of 16	Quarterfinals	Semifinals	Final	
Athlete	Event	Opposition Result	Opposition Result	Opposition Result	Opposition Result	Opposition Result	Opposition Result	Rank
Manuel Herrera	Light flyweight	Bye	Bolívar (VEN); W 4–1	Makhmutov (URS); L 1–4	Did not advance			
Meluin de Leon	Flyweight	Bye	Ovnteni (NIG); W RSC R1	Desavoye (FRA); W 5–0	Skryabin (URS); L 2–3	Did not advance		
Emilio Villegas	Featherweight	Fitzgerald (IRL); L 1–4	Did not advance					
José Saizozema	Light welterweight	Bye	Quartey (GHA); L 0–5	Did not advance				
Pedro Frias	Welterweight	Masoe (ASA); L RSC R1	Did not advance					

== Judo ==
Athlete	Event	Round of 64	Round of 32	Round of 16	Quarterfinals	Semifinals	Repechage			Final	
Athlete	Event	Round of 64	Round of 32	Round of 16	Quarterfinals	Semifinals	Round 1	Round 2	Round 3	Final	
Athlete	Event	Opposition Result	Opposition Result	Opposition Result	Opposition Result	Opposition Result	Opposition Result	Opposition Result	Opposition Result	Opposition Result	Rank
Gilberto García	60 kg	Bye	Lee (HKG); L Ippon	Did not advance							

== Table tennis ==
Men

Athlete	Event	Group Stage								Round of 16	Quarterfinal	Semifinal	Final	
Athlete	Event	Opposition Result	Opposition Result	Opposition Result	Opposition Result	Opposition Result	Opposition Result	Opposition Result	Rank	Opposition Result	Opposition Result	Opposition Result	Opposition Result	Rank
Mario Álvarez	Singles	Kucharski (POL); L 0–3	Panský (TCH); L 1–3	Prean (GBR); L 1–3	Vong (HKG); L 2–3	Ng (CAN); L 0–3	Sta (TUN); W 3–0	Yoo (KOR); L 0–3	7	Did not advance				
Raymundo Fermín	Singles	Lindh (SWE); L 1–3	Kalinić (YUG); L 0–3	Douglas (GBR); L 0–3	Kano (BRA); L 0–3	Huang (TPE); L 0–3	Helmy (EGY); L 1–3	Saif (PAK); L 1–3	8	Did not advance				
Mario Álvarez; Raymundo Fermín	Doubles	Kim / Kim (KOR); L 0–2	Douglas / Andrew (GBR); L 0–2	Chih / Chih (TPE); L 0–2	Ding / Bär (AUT); L 1–2	Böhm / Rebel (FRG); L 0–2	Griffiths / Jackson (NZL); W 2–0	Waldner / Appelgren (SWE); L 0–2	7	Did not advance				

Women

Athlete	Event	Group Stage						Round of 16	Quarterfinal	Semifinal	Final	
Athlete	Event	Opposition Result	Opposition Result	Opposition Result	Opposition Result	Opposition Result	Rank	Opposition Result	Opposition Result	Opposition Result	Opposition Result	Rank
Blanca Alejo	Singles	Jiao (CHN); L 0–3	Domonkos (CAN); L 0–3	Urbán (HUN); L 0–3	Gee (USA); L 0–3	Kovtun (URS); L 0–3	6	Did not advance				

== Weightlifting ==
Athlete	Event	Snatch		Clean & jerk		Total	Rank
Athlete	Event	Result	Rank	Result	Rank	Total	Rank
Cristian Rivera	56 kg	NM		DNF			
Frank Pérez	82.5 kg	145.0	10	172.5	10	317.5	10
Francisco Guzman	90 kg	142.5	13	170.0	20	312.5	18
José Miguel Guzman	+110 kg	142.5	13	190.0	11	332.5	13
