= Dominican Republic at the 2008 Summer Olympics =

- Flag of the Dominican Republic
- IOC code: DOM
- NOC: Dominican Republic Olympic Committee
- Website: www.colimdo.org (in Spanish)

in Beijing
- Competitors: 25 in 8 sports
- Flag bearers: Félix Sanchez (opening); Manuel Félix Díaz (closing)
- Medals Ranked 46th: Gold 1 Silver 1 Bronze 0 Total 2

Summer Olympics appearances (overview)
- 1964; 1968; 1972; 1976; 1980; 1984; 1988; 1992; 1996; 2000; 2004; 2008; 2012; 2016; 2020; 2024; 2028

The Dominican Republic competed in the 2008 Summer Olympics, held in Beijing, People's Republic of China from August 8 to August 24, 2008.

== Medalists ==
Medal	Name	Sport	Event
Gold	Manuel Félix Díaz	Boxing	Light welterweight
Silver	Gabriel Mercedes	Taekwondo	Men's 58 kg

== Athletics ==
Key

- Note–Ranks given for track events are within the athlete's heat only
- Q = Qualified for the next round
- q = Qualified for the next round as a fastest loser or, in field events, by position without achieving the qualifying target
- NR = National record
- N/A = Round not applicable for the event
- Bye = Athlete not required to compete in round

Men

Athlete	Event	Heat		Semifinal		Final	
Athlete	Event	Result	Rank	Result	Rank	Result	Rank
Arismendy Peguero	400 m	46.28	6	Did not advance			
Félix Sánchez	400 m hurdles	51.10	5	Did not advance			
Joel Báez; Pedro Mejía; Arismendy Peguero; Carlos Yohelin Santa; Yoel Tapia	4 × 400 m relay	3:04.31 SB	8	—N/a		Did not advance	

Women

Athlete	Event	Heat		Quarterfinal		Semifinal		Final	
Athlete	Event	Result	Rank	Result	Rank	Result	Rank	Result	Rank
Mariely Sánchez	200 m	24.05	6	Did not advance					

== Boxing ==
The Dominican Republic qualified six boxers for the Olympic boxing tournament. Nunez was the only boxer to qualify at the World Championships. Payano became the second to qualify for the nation, doing so at the first American qualifying tournament. The remaining four boxers qualified at the second American continental qualifying tournament.

Athlete	Event	Round of 32	Round of 16	Quarterfinals	Semifinals	Final	
Athlete	Event	Opposition Result	Opposition Result	Opposition Result	Opposition Result	Opposition Result	Rank
Winston Mendez	Light flyweight	Bilali (KEN); W 9–3	Ruanroeng (THA); L 3–7	Did not advance			
Juan Carlos Payano	Flyweight	Thomas (FRA); W 10–6	Picardi (ITA); L 4–8	Did not advance			
Roberto Navarro	Featherweight	Porozo (ECU); L 3–3^{+}	Did not advance				
Manuel Félix Díaz	Light welterweight	Hambardzumyan (ARM); W 11–4	Joyce (IRL); W 11^{+}–11	Sepahvand (IRI); W 11–6	Vastine (FRA); W 12–10	Boonjumnong (THA); W 12–4	1st place, gold medalist(s)
Gilbert Lenin Castillo	Welterweight	Stretskyy (UKR); L 6–9	Did not advance				
Argenis Casimiro	Middleweight	Bye	Blanco (VEN); L 7–18	Did not advance			

== Judo ==
Athlete	Event	Preliminary	Round of 32	Round of 16	Quarterfinals	Semifinals	Repechage 1	Repechage 2	Repechage 3	Final / BM	
Athlete	Event	Opposition Result	Opposition Result	Opposition Result	Opposition Result	Opposition Result	Opposition Result	Opposition Result	Opposition Result	Opposition Result	Rank
Juan Jacinto	Men's −66 kg	Bye	Uchishiba (JPN); L 0000–1001	Did not advance			Miresmaeili (IRI); L 0000–0011	Did not advance			
Teófilo Diek	Men's −100 kg	Bye	Morgan (CAN); L 1001–0000	Did not advance							
María García	Women's −52 kg	Bye	Fernandes (BRA); W 0010–0001	Kim K-O (KOR); L 0000–1003	Did not advance						

== Sailing ==
Men

Athlete	Event	Race											Net points	Final rank
Athlete	Event	1	2	3	4	5	6	7	8	9	10	M*	Net points	Final rank
Raul Aguayo	Laser	37	30	35	~~38~~	34	28	29	36	29	CAN	EL	258	40

M = Medal race; EL = Eliminated – did not advance into the medal race; CAN = Race cancelled;

== Shooting ==
Men

Athlete	Event	Qualification		Final	
Athlete	Event	Points	Rank	Points	Rank
Julio Elizardo Dujarric Lembcke	Skeet	110	31	Did not advance	

== Swimming ==
Men

Athlete	Event	Heat		Semifinal		Final	
Athlete	Event	Time	Rank	Time	Rank	Time	Rank
Jacinto Ayala	50 m freestyle	22.57	34	Did not advance			

== Table tennis ==
Singles

Athlete	Event	Preliminary round	Round 1	Round 2	Round 3	Round 4	Quarterfinals	Semifinals	Final / BM	
Athlete	Event	Opposition Result	Opposition Result	Opposition Result	Opposition Result	Opposition Result	Opposition Result	Opposition Result	Opposition Result	Rank
Lin Ju	Men's singles	Bye	Apolonia (POR); W 4–1	Crisan (ROU); L 1–4	Did not advance					
Lian Qian	Women's singles	Fomum (CMR); W 4–0	Komwong (THA); L 1–4	Did not advance						
Wu Xue	Women's singles	Bye		Sang Xu (AUS); W 4–0	Wang Yg (SIN); W 4–1	Gao J (USA); W 4–3	Guo Y (CHN); L 0–4	Did not advance		

Team

Athlete	Event	Group round		Semifinals	Bronze playoff 1	Bronze playoff 2	Bronze medal	Final	
Athlete	Event	Opposition Result	Rank	Opposition Result	Opposition Result	Opposition Result	Opposition Result	Opposition Result	Rank
Lian Qian; Johenny Valdez; Wu Xue	Women's team	Group A China; L 0 – 3 Austria; L 0 – 3 Croatia; L 1 – 3	4	Did not advance					

== Taekwondo ==
Athlete	Event	Round of 16	Quarterfinals	Semifinals	Repechage	Bronze Medal	Final	
Athlete	Event	Opposition Result	Opposition Result	Opposition Result	Opposition Result	Opposition Result	Opposition Result	Rank
Gabriel Mercedes	Men's −58 kg	Póvoa (POR); W 3–0	Chu M-Y (TPE); W 3–2	Ramos (ESP); W 3–2	Bye		Pérez (MEX); L 1–1 SUP	2nd place, silver medalist(s)

== Weightlifting ==
Athlete	Event	Snatch		Clean & Jerk		Total	Rank
Athlete	Event	Result	Rank	Result	Rank	Total	Rank
Yuderqui Contreras	Women's −53 kg	93	4	111	5	204	5

== See also ==
- Dominican Republic at the 2007 Pan American Games
- Dominican Republic at the 2010 Central American and Caribbean Games
