= Dominican Republic at the 1992 Summer Olympics =

- Flag of the Dominican Republic
- IOC code: DOM
- NOC: Dominican Republic Olympic Committee

in Barcelona
- Competitors: 32 (30 men and 2 women) in 5 sports
- Flag bearer: Altagracia Contreras
- Medals: Gold 0 Silver 0 Bronze 0 Total 0

Summer Olympics appearances (overview)
- 1964; 1968; 1972; 1976; 1980; 1984; 1988; 1992; 1996; 2000; 2004; 2008; 2012; 2016; 2020; 2024

The Dominican Republic competed at the 1992 Summer Olympics in Barcelona, Spain.

== Competitors ==
The following is the list of number of competitors in the Games.

Sport	Men	Women	Total
Baseball	20	–	20
Boxing	6	–	6
Judo	2	2	4
Weightlifting	1	–	1
Wrestling	1	–	1
Total	30	2	32

== Results by event ==
=== Baseball ===
The Dominican team won two of its seven games in the preliminary round of the first Olympic baseball tournament, defeating Italy and Spain. Its record put the team in sixth place and out of further contention.

Men's Team Competition:

- Dominican Republic - 6th place (2-5)
- Team Roster
  - Félix Nova
  - José Ramón Veras
  - Manuel Guzmán
  - Fabio Aquino
  - Roberto Casey
  - Eugenio Váldez
  - Rafelito Mercedes
  - Félix Tejada
  - Teófilo Peña
  - Alexis Peña
  - Fausto Peña
  - Teodoro Novas
  - Cipriano Ventura
  - Juan Sánchez
  - Juan Viñas
  - Roque Solano
  - Silvestre Popoteur
  - Elias Olivos
  - Benjamin Heredia
  - José Santana

=== Boxing ===
Men's Light Flyweight (– 48 kg)

- Fausto del Rosario
  - First Round — Lost to Eric Griffin (USA), 2:14

Men's Flyweight

- Héctor Avila

Men's Bantamweight

- Agustin Castillo

Men's Featherweight

- Victoriano Sosa

Men's Light-Welterweight

- Rafael Romero

Men's Welterweight

- César Ramos

=== Judo ===
Men's Extra-Lightweight

- Gilberto García

Men's Half-Lightweight

- Ekers Raposo

Women's Lightweight

- Altagracia Contreras

Women's Half-Middleweight

- Eleucadia Vargas

=== Weightlifting ===
Athlete	Event	Snatch		Clean & Jerk		Total	Rank
Athlete	Event	Result	Rank	Result	Rank	Total	Rank
Juan Manuel Cueto	Men's −60 kg	112.5	25	135	25	247.5	25

=== Wrestling ===
Men's Greco-Roman Flyweight

- Ulises Valentin

== See also ==
- Dominican Republic at the 1991 Pan American Games

== Sources ==
- Official Olympic Reports
- sports-reference
