= Dominican Republic at the 2012 Summer Olympics =

- Flag of the Dominican Republic
- IOC code: DOM
- NOC: Dominican Republic Olympic Committee
- Website: www.colimdo.org (in Spanish)

in London
- Competitors: 35 in 10 sports
- Flag bearers: Gabriel Mercedes (opening); Félix Sánchez (closing)
- Medals Ranked 46th: Gold 1 Silver 1 Bronze 0 Total 2

Summer Olympics appearances (overview)
- 1964; 1968; 1972; 1976; 1980; 1984; 1988; 1992; 1996; 2000; 2004; 2008; 2012; 2016; 2020; 2024

The Dominican Republic competed at the 2012 Summer Olympics in London, United Kingdom, from 27 July to 12 August 2012. This was the nation's thirteenth consecutive appearance at the Olympics.

The Dominican Republic Olympic Committee (Spanish: Comité Olímpico Dominicano, COD) sent the nation's largest delegation to the Games. A total of 35 athletes, 15 men and 20 women, competed in 10 sports. For the first time in Olympic history, Dominican Republic was represented by more female than male athletes. Women's volleyball was the only team-based sport in which Dominican Republic was represented at these Olympic Games. Among the sports played by the athletes, Dominican Republic marked its Olympic debut in artistic gymnastics.

The Dominican Republic team featured promising athletes: Felix Sánchez, track star in the hurdles and former Olympic gold medalist, Luguelín Santos, world junior champion, and gold medalist at the first Youth Olympic Games, and Gabriel Mercedes, Olympic silver medalist in the men's taekwondo event at Beijing. Two of these athletes won the nation's only medals in athletics at the London games. Felix Sánchez also managed to repeat his gold medal streak from Athens in the men's 400 m hurdles event. Luguelín Santos, on the other hand, settled for the silver instead in the men's 400 metres, behind Grenada's Kirani James. Gabriel Mercedes, being the only medalist to return for his second Olympic appearance, was the nation's flag bearer at the opening ceremony.

== Medalists ==
| Medal | Name | Sport | Event | Date |
|---|---|---|---|---|
| Gold | Félix Sánchez | Athletics | Men's 400 m hurdles | 6 August |
| Silver | Luguelín Santos | Athletics | Men's 400 m | 6 August |

== Competitors ==
The following is the list of number of competitors participating in the Games:

| Sport | Men | Women | Total |
|---|---|---|---|
| Athletics | 8 | 3 | 11 |
| Boxing | 3 | 0 | 3 |
| Gymnastics | 0 | 1 | 1 |
| Judo | 0 | 1 | 1 |
| Shooting | 1 | 0 | 1 |
| Swimming | 1 | 1 | 2 |
| Table tennis | 1 | 0 | 1 |
| Taekwondo | 1 | 0 | 1 |
| Volleyball | 0 | 12 | 12 |
| Weightlifting | 0 | 2 | 2 |
| Total | 15 | 20 | 35 |

== Athletics ==
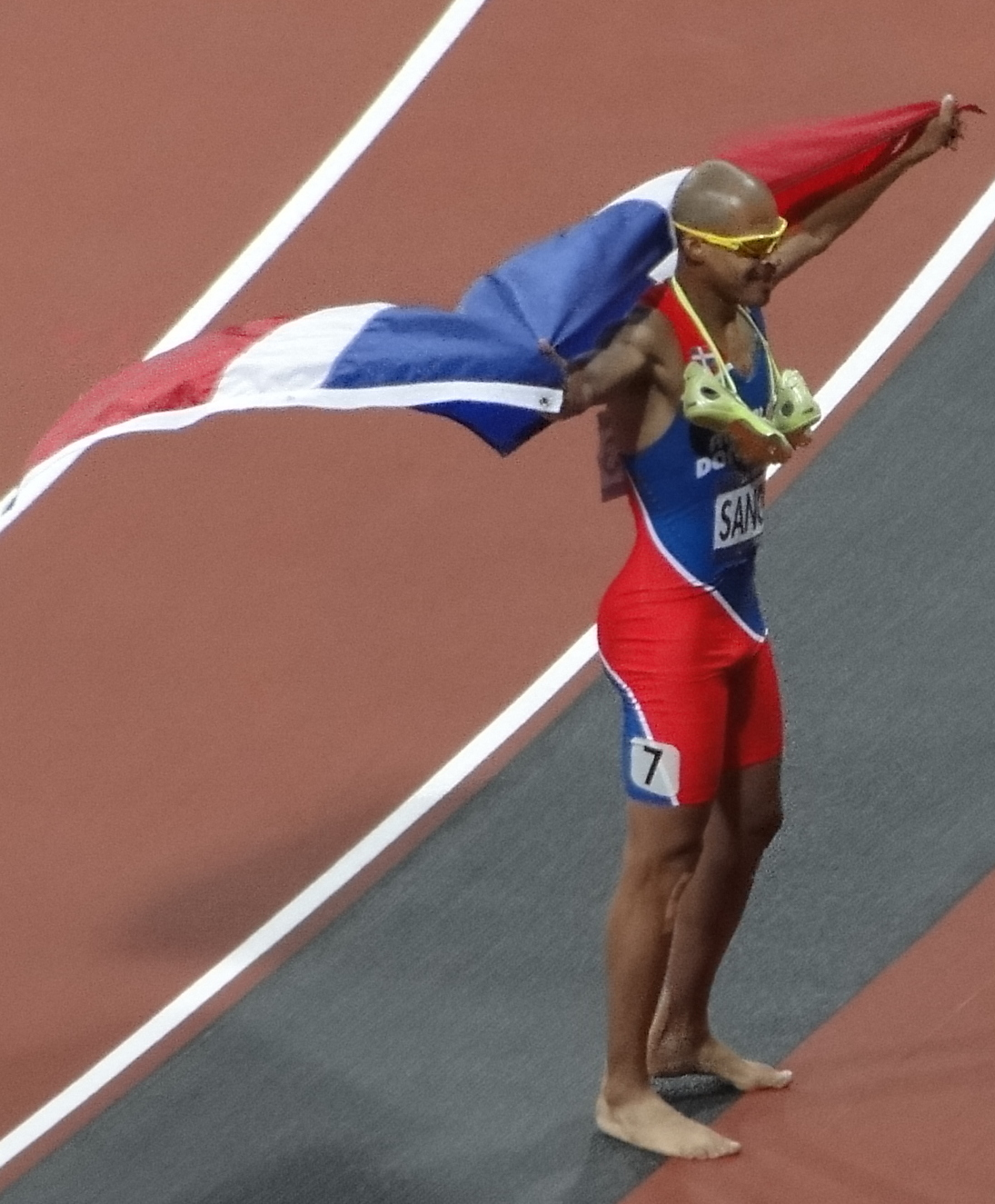
Félix Sánchez celebrated his gold medal victory for the second time in the men's 400 m hurdles.

The Dominican Republic had qualifying standards in the following athletics events (up to a maximum of 3 athletes in each event at the 'A' Standard, and 1 at the 'B' Standard):

Key

- Note – Ranks given for track events are within the athlete's heat only
- Q = Qualified for the next round
- q = Qualified for the next round as a fastest loser or, in field events, by position without achieving the qualifying target
- NR = National record
- N/A = Round not applicable for the event
- Bye = Athlete not required to compete in round

Men

| Athlete | Event | Heat | | Semifinal | | Final | |
| Athlete | Event | Result | Rank | Result | Rank | Result | Rank |
|---|---|---|---|---|---|---|---|
| Winder Cuevas | 400 m hurdles | 50.15 SB | 6 | Did not advance | | | |
| Carlos Jorge | 200 m | 21.02 | 6 | Did not advance | | | |
| Félix Sánchez | 400 m hurdles | 49.24 | 1 Q | 47.76 SB | 1 Q | 47.63 SB | 1st place, gold medalist(s) |
| Luguelín Santos | 400 m | 45.04 | 1 Q | 44.78 | 1 Q | 44.46 | 2nd place, silver medalist(s) |
| Gustavo Cuesta; Joel Mejía; Arismendy Peguero; Félix Sánchez; Luguelín Santos; Yon Soriano | 4 × 400 m relay | DSQ | | — | | Did not advance | |

Women

| Athlete | Event | Heat | | Semifinal | | Final | |
| Athlete | Event | Result | Rank | Result | Rank | Result | Rank |
|---|---|---|---|---|---|---|---|
| LaVonne Idlette | 100 m hurdles | 13.60 | 5 | Did not advance | | | |
| Mariely Sánchez | 200 m | 23.20 SB | 6 | Did not advance | | | |
| Raysa Sánchez | 400 m | 52.47 | 5 | Did not advance | | | |

== Boxing ==
The Dominican Republic has qualified boxers for the following events

Men

| Athlete | Event | Round of 32 | Round of 16 | Quarterfinals | Semifinals | Final | |
| Athlete | Event | Opposition Result | Opposition Result | Opposition Result | Opposition Result | Opposition Result | Rank |
|---|---|---|---|---|---|---|---|
| William Encarnación | Bantamweight | Lemboumba (GAB); W 15–6 | Ouadahi (ALG); L 10–16 | Did not advance | | | |
| Wellington Arias | Lightweight | Marriaga (COL); W 17–8 | Lomachenko (UKR); L 3–15 | Did not advance | | | |
| Junior Castillo | Middleweight | Ogogo (GBR); L 6–13 | Did not advance | | | | |

== Gymnastics ==
=== Artistic ===
Women

| Athlete | Event | Qualification | | | | | | Final | | | | | |
| Athlete | Event | Apparatus | | | | Total | Rank | Apparatus | | | | Total | Rank |
| Athlete | Event | F | V | UB | BB | Total | Rank | F | V | UB | BB | Total | Rank |
|---|---|---|---|---|---|---|---|---|---|---|---|---|---|
| Yamilet Peña | Floor | 12.300 | — | | | 12.300 | 72 | Did not advance | | | | | |
| Yamilet Peña | Vault | — | 14.699 | — | | 14.699 | 5 Q | — | 14.516 | — | | 14.516 | 6 |

Legend: Q = qualified for individual final*

== Judo ==
The Dominican Republic has qualified 1 judoka

| Athlete | Event | Round of 32 | Round of 16 | Quarterfinals | Semifinals | Repechage | Final / BM | |
| Athlete | Event | Opposition Result | Opposition Result | Opposition Result | Opposition Result | Opposition Result | Opposition Result | Rank |
|---|---|---|---|---|---|---|---|---|
| María García | Women's −52 kg | Bye | Müller (LUX); L 0002–1011 | Did not advance | | | | |

== Shooting ==
The Dominican Republic has qualified one quota place in the men's trap event;

Men

| Athlete | Event | Qualification | | Final | |
| Athlete | Event | Points | Rank | Points | Rank |
|---|---|---|---|---|---|
| Sergio Piñero | Trap | 118 | 20 | Did not advance | |
| Sergio Piñero | Double trap | DNS | | Did not advance | |

== Swimming ==
Men

| Athlete | Event | Heat | | Semifinal | | Final | |
| Athlete | Event | Time | Rank | Time | Rank | Time | Rank |
|---|---|---|---|---|---|---|---|
| Nicholas Schwab | 200 m freestyle | 1:53.41 | 37 | Did not advance | | | |

Women

| Athlete | Event | Heat | | Semifinal | | Final | |
| Athlete | Event | Time | Rank | Time | Rank | Time | Rank |
|---|---|---|---|---|---|---|---|
| Dorian McMenemy | 100 m butterfly | 1:05.78 | 41 | Did not advance | | | |

== Table tennis ==
The Dominican Republic has qualified 1 athlete.

| Athlete | Event | Preliminary round | Round 1 | Round 2 | Round 3 | Round 4 | Quarterfinals | Semifinals | Final / BM | |
| Athlete | Event | Opposition Result | Opposition Result | Opposition Result | Opposition Result | Opposition Result | Opposition Result | Opposition Result | Opposition Result | Rank |
|---|---|---|---|---|---|---|---|---|---|---|
| Lin Ju | Men's singles | Bye | Kim S-N (PRK); W 4–3 | Freitas (POR); L 0–4 | Did not advance | | | | | |

== Taekwondo ==
Gabriel Mercedes has ensured a quota place for the Dominican Republic in the men's 58 kg by reaching the top 3 of the 2011 WTF World Qualification Tournament.

| Athlete | Event | Round of 16 | Quarterfinals | Semifinals | Repechage | Bronze Medal | Final | |
| Athlete | Event | Opposition Result | Opposition Result | Opposition Result | Opposition Result | Opposition Result | Opposition Result | Rank |
|---|---|---|---|---|---|---|---|---|
| Gabriel Mercedes | Men's −58 kg | Al-Kubati (YEM); L 3–8 | Did not advance | | | | | |

== Volleyball ==
The Dominican Republic has qualified one women's team for the indoor tournament.

- Women's team event – 1 team of 12 players

=== Women's indoor tournament ===
Team roster

The following is the Dominican roster in the women's volleyball tournament of the 2012 Summer Olympics.

Head coach: (Brazil) Marcos Kwiek

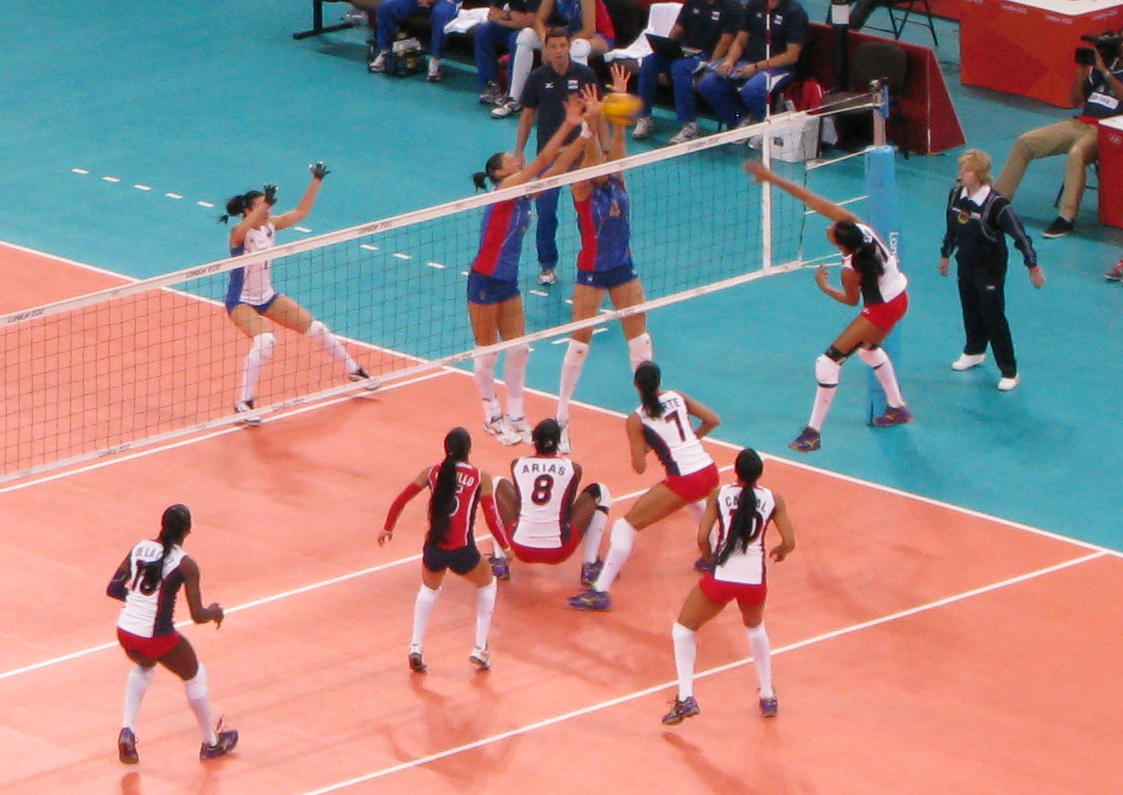
Russia and Dominican Republic women's volleyball teams at the 2012 London Olympics

| № | Name | Date of birth | Height | Weight | Spike | Block | 2012 club |
|---|---|---|---|---|---|---|---|
| 1 | Annerys Vargas | 7 August 1981 | 1.96 m (6 ft 5 in) | 70 kg (150 lb) | 327 cm (129 in) | 320 cm (130 in) | (Puerto Rico) Criollas de Caguas |
| 3 | Lisvel Elisa Eve | 10 September 1991 | 1.94 m (6 ft 4 in) | 70 kg (150 lb) | 325 cm (128 in) | 315 cm (124 in) | (Dominican Republic) Mirador Volleyball |
| 5 | Brenda Castillo (L) | 5 June 1992 | 1.67 m (5 ft 6 in) | 55 kg (121 lb) | 245 cm (96 in) | 230 cm (91 in) | (Dominican Republic) San Cristóbal |
| 7 | Niverka Marte | 19 October 1990 | 1.78 m (5 ft 10 in) | 71 kg (157 lb) | 295 cm (116 in) | 283 cm (111 in) | (Dominican Republic) Deportivo Nacional |
| 8 | Cándida Arias | 11 March 1992 | 1.94 m (6 ft 4 in) | 68 kg (150 lb) | 320 cm (130 in) | 315 cm (124 in) | (Dominican Republic) San Cristóbal |
| 9 | Sidarka Núñez | 25 June 1984 | 1.85 m (6 ft 1 in) | 62 kg (137 lb) | 330 cm (130 in) | 320 cm (130 in) | (Dominican Republic) Club Malanga |
| 10 | Milagros Cabral (C) | 17 October 1978 | 1.82 m (6 ft 0 in) | 63 kg (139 lb) | 325 cm (128 in) | 320 cm (130 in) | (Dominican Republic) Los Cachorros |
| 12 | Karla Echenique | 16 May 1986 | 1.80 m (5 ft 11 in) | 65 kg (143 lb) | 300 cm (120 in) | 290 cm (110 in) | (Dominican Republic) Deportivo Nacional |
| 13 | Cindy Rondón | 12 November 1987 | 1.86 m (6 ft 1 in) | 61 kg (134 lb) | 320 cm (130 in) | 315 cm (124 in) | (Dominican Republic) Mirador Volleyball |
| 14 | Prisilla Rivera | 29 December 1984 | 1.86 m (6 ft 1 in) | 70 kg (150 lb) | 320 cm (130 in) | 315 cm (124 in) | (Dominican Republic) San Pedro |
| 17 | Gina Mambrú | 21 January 1986 | 1.82 m (6 ft 0 in) | 65 kg (143 lb) | 330 cm (130 in) | 315 cm (124 in) | (Dominican Republic) Los Cachorros |
| 18 | Bethania de la Cruz | 13 May 1987 | 1.88 m (6 ft 2 in) | 70 kg (150 lb) | 330 cm (130 in) | 320 cm (130 in) | (Dominican Republic) Deportivo Nacional |

Group play

| Pos | Team | Pld | W | L | Pts | SW | SL | SR | SPW | SPL | SPR | Qualification |
|---|---|---|---|---|---|---|---|---|---|---|---|---|
| 1 | Russia | 5 | 5 | 0 | 14 | 15 | 4 | 3.750 | 459 | 352 | 1.304 | Quarter-finals |
| 2 | Italy | 5 | 4 | 1 | 13 | 14 | 5 | 2.800 | 442 | 368 | 1.201 | Quarter-finals |
| 3 | Japan | 5 | 3 | 2 | 9 | 11 | 6 | 1.833 | 401 | 335 | 1.197 | Quarter-finals |
| 4 | Dominican Republic | 5 | 2 | 3 | 6 | 8 | 9 | 0.889 | 374 | 362 | 1.033 | Quarter-finals |
| 5 | Great Britain | 5 | 1 | 4 | 2 | 3 | 14 | 0.214 | 295 | 396 | 0.745 | |
| 6 | Algeria | 5 | 0 | 5 | 1 | 2 | 15 | 0.133 | 252 | 410 | 0.615 | |

| 28 July 2012; 16:45 | Italy | 3–1 | Dominican Republic | Earls Court Exhibition Centre, London; Attendance: 14,000; Referees: Zorica Bjelić (SRB), Rolando Cholakian (ARG) |
| 28 July 2012; 16:45 | (25–17, 23–25, 25–19, 25–15) report statistics | | | Earls Court Exhibition Centre, London; Attendance: 14,000; Referees: Zorica Bjelić (SRB), Rolando Cholakian (ARG) |

| 30 July 2012; 14:45 | Dominican Republic | 1–3 | Russia | Earls Court Exhibition Centre, London; Attendance: 14,800; Referees: Rogerio Espicalsky (BRA), Karin Zahorcova (CZE) |
| 30 July 2012; 14:45 | (23–25, 15–25, 26–24, 22–25) report statistics | | | Earls Court Exhibition Centre, London; Attendance: 14,800; Referees: Rogerio Espicalsky (BRA), Karin Zahorcova (CZE) |

| 1 August 2012; 09:30 | Dominican Republic | 0–3 | Japan | Earls Court Exhibition Centre, London; Attendance: 9,000; Referees: Karin Zahorcova (CZE), Georgios Karampetsos (GRE) |
| 1 August 2012; 09:30 | (20–25, 19–25, 23–25) result statistics | | | Earls Court Exhibition Centre, London; Attendance: 9,000; Referees: Karin Zahorcova (CZE), Georgios Karampetsos (GRE) |

| 3 August 2012; 16:45 | Great Britain | 0–3 | Dominican Republic | Earls Court Exhibition Centre, London; Attendance: 14,000; Referees: Mohamad Shaaban (EGY), Janpen Jirakakul (THA) |
| 3 August 2012; 16:45 | (9–25, 18–25, 19–25) result statistics | | | Earls Court Exhibition Centre, London; Attendance: 14,000; Referees: Mohamad Shaaban (EGY), Janpen Jirakakul (THA) |

| 5 August 2012; 09:30 | Algeria | 0–3 | Dominican Republic | Earls Court Exhibition Centre, London; Attendance: 11,000; Referees: Patricia Salvatore (USA), Brian McDougall (GBR) |
| 5 August 2012; 09:30 | (15–25, 16–25, 13–25) result statistics | | | Earls Court Exhibition Centre, London; Attendance: 11,000; Referees: Patricia Salvatore (USA), Brian McDougall (GBR) |

Quarter-final

| 7 August 2012; 19:00 | United States | 3–0 | Dominican Republic | Earls Court Exhibition Centre, London; Attendance: 13,000; Referees: Karin Zahorcova (CZE), Jarpen Jirakakul (THA) |
| 7 August 2012; 19:00 | (25–14, 25–21, 25–22) result statistics | | | Earls Court Exhibition Centre, London; Attendance: 13,000; Referees: Karin Zahorcova (CZE), Jarpen Jirakakul (THA) |

== Weightlifting ==
The Dominican Republic has qualified 2 women.

| Athlete | Event | Snatch | | Clean & Jerk | | Total | Rank |
| Athlete | Event | Result | Rank | Result | Rank | Total | Rank |
|---|---|---|---|---|---|---|---|
| Beatriz Pirón | Women's −48 kg | 77 | 7 | 90 | 11 | 167 | 9 |
| Yuderqui Contreras | Women's −53 kg | ~~94~~ | DNF | — | — | — | DNF |
