= Dominican Republic at the 2004 Summer Olympics =

- Flag of the Dominican Republic
- IOC code: DOM
- NOC: Dominican Republic Olympic Committee
- Website: www.colimdo.org (in Spanish)

in Athens
- Competitors: 33 in 9 sports
- Flag bearer: Francia Jackson
- Medals Ranked 54th: Gold 1 Silver 0 Bronze 0 Total 1

Summer Olympics appearances (overview)
- 1964; 1968; 1972; 1976; 1980; 1984; 1988; 1992; 1996; 2000; 2004; 2008; 2012; 2016; 2020; 2024

The Dominican Republic was represented at the 2004 Summer Olympics in Athens, Greece by the Dominican Republic Olympic Committee.

In total, 33 athletes including 17 men and 16 women represented the Dominican Republic in nine different sports including athletics, boxing, judo, shooting, table tennis, taekwondo, volleyball, weightlifting and wrestling.

The Dominican Republic won one medal at the games after Félix Sánchez won gold in the men's 400 m hurdles. It was the first gold medal won by an athlete from the Dominican Republic and the second medal overall that the country had won.

== Background ==
In 10 previous appearances at the Summer Olympics, the Dominican Republic had only ever won one medal – a bronze at the 1984 Summer Olympics in Los Angeles, California, United States.

== Competitors ==
In total, 33 athletes represented the Dominican Republic at the 2004 Summer Olympics in Athens, Greece across nine different sports.

Sport	Men	Women	Total
Athletics	3	2	5
Boxing	5	–	5
Judo	5	0	5
Shooting	1	0	1
Table tennis	1	1	2
Taekwondo	1	0	1
Volleyball	0	12	12
Weightlifting	0	1	1
Wrestling	1	0	1
Total	17	16	33

== Medalists ==
The Dominican Republic won one medal at the games after Félix Sánchez claimed gold in the men's 400 m hurdles.

Medal	Name	Sport	Event	Date
Gold	Félix Sánchez	Athletics	Men's 400 m hurdles	August 26

== Athletics ==
In total, five Dominican athletes participated in the athletics events – Juana Arrendel in the women's high jump, Juan Sainfleur in the men's 100 m, Félix Sánchez in the men's 400 m hurdles, Carlos Santa in the men's 400 m and Fior Vásquez in the women's shot put.

Men

Athlete	Event	Heat		Quarterfinal		Semifinal		Final	
Athlete	Event	Result	Rank	Result	Rank	Result	Rank	Result	Rank
Juan Sainfleur	100 m	DNF		Did not advance					
Carlos Santa	400 m	45.31	1 Q	—N/a		45.58	4	Did not advance	
Félix Sánchez	400 m hurdles	48.51	1 Q	—N/a		47.93	1 Q	47.63	1st place, gold medalist(s)

Women

Athlete	Event	Qualification		Final	
Athlete	Event	Distance	Position	Distance	Position
Juana Arrendel	High jump	1.89	=16	Did not advance	
Fior Vásquez	Shot put	17.99	14	Did not advance	

== Boxing ==
In total, five Dominican athletes participated in the boxing events – Manuel Félix Díaz in the lightweight category, Argenis Mendez in the bantamweight category, Isidro Mosquea in the light welterweight category, Juan Carlos Payano in the flyweight category and Juan Ubaldo in the middleweight.

Athlete	Event	Round of 32	Round of 16	Quarterfinals	Semifinals	Final	
Athlete	Event	Opposition Result	Opposition Result	Opposition Result	Opposition Result	Opposition Result	Rank
Juan Carlos Payano	Flyweight	Vankeev (BLR); W 26–18	Thomas (FRA); L 17–36	Did not advance			
Argenis Mendez	Bantamweight	Tretyak (UKR); L 24–30	Did not advance				
Manuel Félix Díaz	Lightweight	Bye	Yeleuov (KAZ); L 16–28	Did not advance			
Isidro Mosquea	Light welterweight	Nafil (MAR); L 40–42	Did not advance				
Juan Ubaldo	Middleweight	N'Jikam (CMR); L 22–22^{+}	Did not advance				

== Judo ==
In total, five Dominican athletes participated in the judo events – José Miguel Boissard in the men's −81 kg category, Vicbart Geraldino in the men's −90 kg category, Juan Carlos Jacinto in the men's −66 kg category, Modesto Lara in the men's −60 kg category and José Vásquez in the men's −100 kg category.

Athlete	Event	Round of 32	Round of 16	Quarterfinals	Semifinals	Repechage 1	Repechage 2	Repechage 3	Final / BM	
Athlete	Event	Opposition Result	Opposition Result	Opposition Result	Opposition Result	Opposition Result	Opposition Result	Opposition Result	Opposition Result	Rank
Modesto Lara	−60 kg	Nomura (JPN); L 0000–1120	Did not advance			Gussenberg (GER); L 0000–0012	Did not advance			
Juan Carlos Jacinto	−66 kg	Kipshakbayev (KAZ); L 0000–0100	Did not advance							
José Miguel Boissard	−81 kg	Wanner (GER); L 0000–1001	Did not advance							
Vicbart Geraldino	−90 kg	Besolí (AND); W 1000–0000	Gordon (GBR); L 0001–1000	Did not advance		Kelly (AUS); L 0000–1010	Did not advance			
José Vásquez	−100 kg	Peltola (FIN); L 0001–1001	Did not advance							

== Shooting ==
In total, one Dominican athlete participated in the shooting events – Julio Elizardo Dujarric in the men's skeet.

Athlete	Event	Qualification		Final	
Athlete	Event	Points	Rank	Points	Rank
Julio Elizardo Dujarric	Skeet	119	=21	Did not advance	

== Table tennis ==
In total, two Dominican athletes participated in the table tennis events – Lin Ju in the men's singles and Wu Xue in the women's singles.

Athlete	Event	Round 1	Round 2	Round 3	Round 4	Quarterfinals	Semifinals	Final / BM	
Athlete	Event	Opposition Result	Opposition Result	Opposition Result	Opposition Result	Opposition Result	Opposition Result	Opposition Result	Rank
Lin Ju	Men's singles	Yuzawa (JPN); W 4–1	Smirnov (RUS); W 4–1	Saive (BEL); W 4–2	Wang H (CHN); L 1–4	Did not advance			
Wu Xue	Women's singles	Fadeyeva (RUS); W 4–1	Fujinuma (JPN); L 0–4	Did not advance					

== Taekwondo ==
In total, one Dominican athletes participated in the taekwondo events – Gabriel Mercedes in the men's −58 kg category.

Athlete	Event	Round of 16	Quarterfinals	Semifinals	Repechage 1	Repechage 2	Final / BM	
Athlete	Event	Opposition Result	Opposition Result	Opposition Result	Opposition Result	Opposition Result	Opposition Result	Rank
Gabriel Mercedes	Men's −58 kg	Salazar (MEX); L 1–10	Did not advance		Shaposhnyk (UKR); W WO	Bayoumi (EGY); L WO	Did not advance	5

== Volleyball ==
In total, 12 Dominican athletes participated in the volleyball events.

Roster

The following is the Dominican Republic roster in the women's volleyball tournament of the 2004 Summer Olympics.

Head coach: (Cuba) Jorge Garbey

No.	Name	Date of birth	Height	Weight	Spike	Block	2004 club
1	Annerys Vargas	7 August 1982	1.94 m (6 ft 4 in)	70 kg (150 lb)	303 cm (119 in)	298 cm (117 in)	(Dominican Republic) Mirador
3	Yudelkys Bautista	5 December 1974	1.93 m (6 ft 4 in)	68 kg (150 lb)	312 cm (123 in)	308 cm (121 in)	(Dominican Republic) Mirador
5	Evelyn Carrera (L)	10 May 1971	1.82 m (6 ft 0 in)	70 kg (150 lb)	301 cm (119 in)	297 cm (117 in)	(Dominican Republic) Los Prados
6	Alexandra Caso	25 April 1987	1.68 m (5 ft 6 in)	59 kg (130 lb)	243 cm (96 in)	241 cm (95 in)	(Dominican Republic) Mirador
7	Sofía Mercedes	25 May 1976	1.85 m (6 ft 1 in)	70 kg (150 lb)	306 cm (120 in)	298 cm (117 in)	(Dominican Republic) Independencia
8	Juana Saviñón	13 September 1980	1.81 m (5 ft 11 in)	75 kg (165 lb)	303 cm (119 in)	300 cm (120 in)	(Dominican Republic) Evosancris
10	Milagros Cabral	17 October 1978	1.81 m (5 ft 11 in)	63 kg (139 lb)	308 cm (121 in)	305 cm (120 in)	(Dominican Republic) Los Cachorros
11	Juana Miguelina González	3 January 1979	1.85 m (6 ft 1 in)	70 kg (150 lb)	295 cm (116 in)	290 cm (110 in)	(Dominican Republic) Modeca
12	Francia Jackson (C)	11 August 1975	1.68 m (5 ft 6 in)	71 kg (157 lb)	280 cm (110 in)	275 cm (108 in)	(Dominican Republic) Mirador
14	Prisilla Rivera	29 December 1986	1.83 m (6 ft 0 in)	67 kg (148 lb)	309 cm (122 in)	305 cm (120 in)	(Dominican Republic) Deportivo Nacional
15	Cosiri Rodríguez	30 August 1977	1.91 m (6 ft 3 in)	72 kg (159 lb)	313 cm (123 in)	305 cm (120 in)	(Dominican Republic) San Cristobál
16	Kenya Moreta	7 April 1981	1.91 m (6 ft 3 in)	76 kg (168 lb)	310 cm (120 in)	305 cm (120 in)	(Dominican Republic) Mirador

Group play

Pos	Team	Pld	W	L	Pts	SW	SL	SR	SPW	SPL	SPR	Qualification
1	China	5	4	1	9	14	4	3.500	429	346	1.240	Quarterfinals
2	Russia	5	3	2	8	11	8	1.375	426	388	1.098	Quarterfinals
3	Cuba	5	3	2	8	11	10	1.100	443	460	0.963	Quarterfinals
4	United States	5	2	3	7	11	10	1.100	472	467	1.011	Quarterfinals
5	Germany	5	2	3	7	7	11	0.636	387	414	0.935	
6	Dominican Republic	5	1	4	6	3	14	0.214	334	416	0.803	

Source: FIVB

14 August 2004; 11:35	Dominican Republic	0-3	Russia	Peace and Friendship Stadium; Referees: Juan Angel Pereyra (ARG), Mahmoud Abdel Magid (EGY)
14 August 2004; 11:35	(17–25, 13–25, 16–25) result			Peace and Friendship Stadium; Referees: Juan Angel Pereyra (ARG), Mahmoud Abdel Magid (EGY)

16 August 2004; 11:00	China	3–0	Dominican Republic	Peace and Friendship Stadium; Referees: Fotios Lekkas (Greece), Jarmo Salonen (Finland)
16 August 2004; 11:00	(25–20, 25–16, 25–16) result			Peace and Friendship Stadium; Referees: Fotios Lekkas (Greece), Jarmo Salonen (Finland)

18 August 2004; 09:00	Dominican Republic	3-2	United States	Peace and Friendship Stadium; Referees: Ryszard Dietrich (POL), Fotios Lekkas (GRE)
18 August 2004; 09:00	(26–24, 22–25, 27–25, 23–25, 19–17) result			Peace and Friendship Stadium; Referees: Ryszard Dietrich (POL), Fotios Lekkas (GRE)

20 August 2004; 11:00	Dominican Republic	0-3	Cuba	Peace and Friendship Stadium; Referees: Karin Zahorcova (CZE), Georgios Karampetsos (GRE)
20 August 2004; 11:00	(23–25, 17–25, 23–25) result			Peace and Friendship Stadium; Referees: Karin Zahorcova (CZE), Georgios Karampetsos (GRE)

22 August 2004; 09:00	Germany	3-0	Dominican Republic	Peace and Friendship Stadium; Referees: Valdir Dellaqua (BRA), Mahmoud Abdel Magid (EGY)
22 August 2004; 09:00	(25–16, 25–19, 25–21) result			Peace and Friendship Stadium; Referees: Valdir Dellaqua (BRA), Mahmoud Abdel Magid (EGY)

== Weightlifting ==
In total, one Dominican athlete participated in the weightlifting events – Wanda Rijo in the women's −75 kg category.

Athlete	Event	Snatch		Clean & Jerk		Total	Rank
Athlete	Event	Result	Rank	Result	Rank	Total	Rank
Wanda Rijo	Women's −75 kg	110	10	127.5	10	237.5	10

== Wrestling ==
In total, one Dominican athletes participated in the wrestling events – Jansel Ramírez in the men's Greco-Roman −55 kg category.

Athlete	Event	Elimination Pool			Quarterfinal	Semifinal	Final / BM	
Athlete	Event	Opposition Result	Opposition Result	Rank	Opposition Result	Opposition Result	Opposition Result	Rank
Jansel Ramírez	−55 kg	Toyota (JPN); L 0–4 ^{ST}	Majoros (HUN); L 0–3 ^{PO}	3	Did not advance			22

== See also ==
- Dominican Republic at the 2003 Pan American Games
- Dominican Republic at the 2004 Summer Paralympics
