= Dominican Republic at the 1968 Summer Olympics =

- Flag of the Dominican Republic
- IOC code: DOM
- NOC: Dominican Republic Olympic Committee

in Mexico City
- Competitors: 18 in 5 sports
- Medals: Gold 0 Silver 0 Bronze 0 Total 0

Summer Olympics appearances (overview)
- 1964; 1968; 1972; 1976; 1980; 1984; 1988; 1992; 1996; 2000; 2004; 2008; 2012; 2016; 2020; 2024

The Dominican Republic competed at the 1968 Summer Olympics in Mexico City, Mexico. 18 competitors, all men, took part in 16 events in 5 sports.

== Athletics ==
Men's 100 metres

- Alberto Torres
  - Round 1 — 10.7 s (→ 6th in heat, did not advance)
- Porfirio Veras
  - Round 1 — 10.5 s (→ 5th in heat, did not advance)

Men's 200 metres

- Porfirio Veras
  - Round 1 — 21.5 s (→ 6th in heat, did not advance)
- Alberto Torres
  - Round 1 — 21.9 s (→ 5th in heat, did not advance)

Men's 400 metres

- José L'Oficial
  - Round 1 — 47.9 s (→ 7th in heat, did not advance)

Men's 800 metres

- José L'Oficial
  - Round 1 — 1:55.6 min (→ 7th in heat, did not advance)

Men's 1500 metres

- Miguel Núñez
  - Round 1 — 4:23.6 min (→ 10th in heat, did not advance)

Men's 110 metres hurdles

- Radhames Mora
  - Round 1 — 16.8 s (→ 7th in heat, did not advance)

Men's 4x100 metres relay

- Luis Soriano, Alberto Torres, Rafael Domínguez, Porfirio Veras
  - Round 1 — 41.4 s (→ 7th in heat, did not advance)

Men's 4x400 metres relay

- Rolando Gómez, Jose L'Oficial, Radhames Mora, David Soriano
  - Round 1 — 3:19.4 min (→ 5th in heat, did not advance)

== Boxing ==
Flyweight (48 kg)

- Ignacio Espinal
  - Round 1 — Lost to Robert Urretavizcaya of Argentina

Lightweight (60 kg)

- Martín Puello
  - Round 2 — Lost to Armando Mendoza of Venezuela

Light welterweight (63.5 kg)

- Donato Cartagena
  - Round 2 — Lost to Jim Wallington of the USA

== Shooting ==
Three shooters, all men, represented the Dominican Republic in 1968.

Trap

- Domingo Lorenzo — 124 pts (→ 55th place)

Skeet

- Riad Yunes — 170 pts (→ 48th place)
- Luis Santana — 57 pts (→ 52nd place)

== Weightlifting ==
Lightweight

- Ramón Silfa
  - Press — 95.0 kg
  - Snatch — 82.5 kg
  - Jerk — DQ (→ no ranking)

Light heavyweight

- José Pérez
  - Press — 110.0 kg
  - Snatch — 105.0 kg
  - Jerk — 135.0 kg
  - Total — 350.0 kg (→ 22nd place)

== Wrestling ==
Men's freestyle flyweight (52 kg)

- José Defran
  - Round 1 — fought Mohammad Ghorbani of Iran
  - Round 2 — fought Richard Sanders of the USA

Men's freestyle featherweight (63 kg)

- Onésimo Rufino
  - Round 1 — fought Choi Jung-Heuk of South Korea
  - Round 2 — fought Masaaki Kaneko of Japan
