= Dominican Republic at the 1980 Summer Olympics =

- Flag of the Dominican Republic
- IOC code: DOM
- NOC: Dominican Republic Olympic Committee

in Moscow
- Competitors: 6
- Flag bearer: Marisela Peralta
- Medals: Gold 0 Silver 0 Bronze 0 Total 0

Summer Olympics appearances (overview)
- 1964; 1968; 1972; 1976; 1980; 1984; 1988; 1992; 1996; 2000; 2004; 2008; 2012; 2016; 2020; 2024

The Dominican Republic competed at the 1980 Summer Olympics in Moscow, USSR.

== Results by event ==
=== Athletics ===
Men's 100 metres

- Gerardo Suero
  - Heat — 10.53
  - Quarterfinals — 10.57 (→ did not advance)

Women's 100 m Hurdles

- Marisela Peralta
  - Heat — 14.18 (→ did not advance)

=== Diving ===
Men's Springboard

- Reynaldo Castro
  - Preliminary Round — 469.14 points (→ 18th place, did not advance)

Men's Platform

- César Augusto Jimenez
  - Preliminary Round — 369.09 points (→ 21st place, did not advance)
