= Dominican Republic at the 2024 Summer Olympics =

Dominican Republic at the Games of the XXXIII Olympiad in Paris

- Flag of the Dominican Republic
- IOC code: DOM
- NOC: Dominican Republic Olympic Committee
- Website: www.colimdo.org (in Spanish)

in Paris, France 26 July 2024 – 11 August 2024
- Competitors: 58 (33 men and 25 women) in 13 sports
- Flag bearers (opening): Audrys Nin Reyes & Marileidy Paulino
- Flag bearers (closing): Alexander Ogando & Beatriz Pirón
- Medals Ranked 59th: Gold 1 Silver 0 Bronze 2 Total 3

Summer Olympics appearances (overview)
- 1964; 1968; 1972; 1976; 1980; 1984; 1988; 1992; 1996; 2000; 2004; 2008; 2012; 2016; 2020; 2024

Dominican Republic competed at the 2024 Summer Olympics in Paris from 26 July to 11 August 2024. It was the nation's sixteenth consecutive appearance at the Summer Olympics.

== Medalists ==
The following Dominican athletes won medals at the Games. In the discipline sections below, medalists' names are bolded.

Medal	Name	Sport	Event	Date
Gold	Marileidy Paulino	Athletics	Women's 400 m	9 August
Bronze	Junior Alcántara	Boxing	Men's 51 kg	4 August
Bronze	Cristian Pinales	Boxing	Men's 80 kg	4 August

**Medals by sport**
**Sport**	1st place, gold medalist(s)	2nd place, silver medalist(s)	3rd place, bronze medalist(s)	**Total**
Athletics	1	0	0	**1**
Boxing	0	0	2	**2**
**Total**	**1**	**0**	**2**	**3**

Medals by gender
Gender	1st place, gold medalist(s)	2nd place, silver medalist(s)	3rd place, bronze medalist(s)	Total
Male	0	0	2	**2**
Female	1	0	0	**1**
Mixed	0	0	0	**0**
Total	1	0	2	3

Medals by date
**Date**	1st place, gold medalist(s)	2nd place, silver medalist(s)	3rd place, bronze medalist(s)	**Total**
04 August	0	0	2	**2**
09 August	1	0	0	**1**
**Total**	**1**	**0**	**2**	3

== Competitors ==
The following is the list of number of competitors in the Games. Note that reserves in football are not counted:

Sport	Men	Women	Total
Athletics	5	4	9
Boxing	2	1	3
Diving	2	1	3
Equestrian	0	1	1
Football	18	0	18
Gymnastics	1	0	1
Judo	1	1	2
Shooting	1	0	1
Swimming	1	1	2
Taekwondo	1	1	2
Volleyball	0	12	12
Weightlifting	0	3	3
Wrestling	1	0	1
Total	33	25	58

== Athletics ==
Dominican Republic track and field athletes achieved the entry standards for Paris 2024, either by passing the direct qualifying mark (or time for track and road races) or by world ranking, in the following events (a maximum of 3 athletes each):

Key

- Note–Ranks given for track events are within the athlete's heat only
- **Q** = Qualified for the next round
- **q** = Qualified for the next round as a fastest loser or, in field events, by position without achieving the qualifying target
- **R** = Qualified for the repechage round
- **NR** = National record
- N/A = Round not applicable for the event
- Bye = Athlete not required to compete in round

Track & road events

Athlete	Event	Heat		Repechage		Semifinal		Final	
Athlete	Event	Result	Rank	Result	Rank	Result	Rank	Result	Rank
José González	Men's 100 m	10.40	8	—N/a		Did not advance			
José González	Men's 200 m	DNS		Did not advance					
Alexander Ogando	Men's 200 m	20.04	3 **Q**	Bye		20.09	4 **Q**	20.02	5
Alexander Ogando	Men's 400 m	45.11 SB	5 **R**	DNS		Did not advance			
Yeral Nuñez	Men's 400 m hurdles	48.67	4 **R**	53.68	5	Did not advance			
**Marileidy Paulino**	Women's 400 m	49.42	1 **Q**	Bye		49.21	2 **Q**	48.17 **OR**	1st place, gold medalist(s)
Robert King; Yeral Nuñez; Erick Sánchez; Anabel Medina; Milagros Durán; Franchina Martínez	Mixed 4 × 400 m relay	3:18.39	8	—N/a				Did not advance	

== Boxing ==
Dominican Republic entered three boxers (two men and one woman) into the Olympic tournament. Junior Alcántara (men's flyweight) secured his selection to the Dominican Republic squad finishing in the top two, at the 2023 Pan American Games in Santiago, Chile. Joining the squad, María Moronta (women's welterweight) qualified for the games following the triumph of her victory in quota bouts round, at the 2024 World Olympic Qualification Tournament 1 in Busto Arsizio, Italy. Cristian Pinales (men's middleweight) secured his spots following the triumph in quota bouts round, at the 2024 World Olympic Qualification Tournament 2 in Bangkok, Thailand.

Athlete	Event	Round of 32	Round of 16	Quarterfinals	Semifinals	Final	
Athlete	Event	Opposition Result	Opposition Result	Opposition Result	Opposition Result	Opposition Result	Rank
**Junior Alcántara**	Men's 51 kg	Bye	Huseynov (AZE); **W** 5–0	Lozano (ESP); **W** 3–2	Bennama (FRA); **L** 0–5	Did not advance	3rd place, bronze medalist(s)
**Cristian Pinales**	Men's 80 kg	Jongjoho (THA); **W** 5–0	Tanglatihan (CHN); **W** 5–0	Veočić (CRO); **W** 5–0	Oralbay (KAZ); **L** 2–3	Did not advance	3rd place, bronze medalist(s)
María Moronta	Women's 66 kg	Chen (TPE); **L** 1–4	Did not advance				

== Diving ==
Dominican Republic entered three divers, Jonathan Ruvalcaba, Frandiel Gómez and Victoria Garza into the Olympic competition.

Athlete	Event	Preliminary		Semifinal		Final	
Athlete	Event	Points	Rank	Points	Rank	Points	Rank
Jonathan Ruvalcaba	Men's 3 m springboard	363.15	18	416.20	12	393.65	9
Frandiel Gómez	Men's 3 m springboard	317.40	23	Did not advance			
Victoria Garza	Women's 10 m platform	226.80	27	Did not advance			

== Equestrian ==
Dominican Republic entered one rider in the dressage events, through the establishments of final olympics ranking for Groups D and E (Americas).

=== Dressage ===
Athlete	Horse	Event	Grand Prix		Grand Prix Freestyle		Overall	
Athlete	Horse	Event	Score	Rank	Technical	Artistic	Score	Rank
Yvonne Losos de Muñiz	Aquamarijn	Individual	61.211	57	Did not advance			

Qualification Legend: Q = Qualified for the final based on position in group; q = Qualified for the final based on overall position

== Football ==
Summary

Key:

- A.E.T – After extra time.
- P – Match decided by penalty-shootout.

Team	Event	Group Stage				Quarterfinal	Semifinal	Final / BM	
Team	Event	Opposition Score	Opposition Score	Opposition Score	Rank	Opposition Score	Opposition Score	Opposition Score	Rank
Dominican Republic men's	Men's tournament	Egypt; **D** 0–0	Spain; **L** 1–3	Uzbekistan; **D** 1–1	3	Did not advance			

=== Men's tournament ===
Dominican Republic men's U-23 football team qualified for the Olympics by advancing to the final match at the 2022 CONCACAF U-20 Championship in Honduras, marking the country's debut in the sport.

Team roster

The Dominican Republic announced a 27-player preliminary squad on 12 June 2024. The squad was reduced to 21 players on 28 June. Junior Firpo withdrew from the squad on 23 July after being recalled by his club and was replaced by Josué Báez.

Head coach: (Spain) Ibai Gómez

No.	Pos.	Player	Date of birth (age)	Caps	Goals	Club
1	GK	**Xavier Valdez**	23 November 2003 (aged 20)	0	0	(United States Soccer Federation) Houston Dynamo
2	DF	Francisco Marizán	28 March 2006 (aged 18)	2	0	(Royal Dutch Football Association) Volendam
3	MF	Josué Báez	23 May 2002 (aged 22)	4	0	(Dominican Football Federation) O&M
4	DF	Edgar Pujol	7 August 2004 (aged 19)	1	0	(Royal Spanish Football Federation) Real Madrid
5	DF	**Luiyi de Lucas***	31 August 1994 (aged 29)	0	0	(Cyprus Football Association) AEL Limassol
6	MF	**Heinz Mörschel***	24 August 1997 (aged 26)	0	0	(Hungarian Football Federation) Újpest
7	FW	Óscar Ureña	31 May 2003 (aged 21)	1	0	(Royal Spanish Football Federation) Leganés
8	MF	Ángel Montes de Oca	18 February 2001 (aged 23)	1	0	(Dominican Football Federation) Cibao
9	FW	**Rafael Núñez**	25 January 2002 (aged 22)	4	0	(Royal Spanish Football Federation) Elche
10	MF	**Edison Azcona**	21 November 2003 (aged 20)	4	1	(United States Soccer Federation) Las Vegas Lights
11	FW	Peter González	25 July 2002 (aged 21)	0	0	(Royal Spanish Football Federation) Valencia
12	DF	**Joao Urbáez**	24 July 2002 (aged 22)	4	0	(Royal Spanish Football Federation) Leganés
13	GK	Enrique Bösl	7 February 2004 (aged 20)	2	0	(German Football Association) FC Ingolstadt 04
14	MF	Omar de la Cruz	26 August 2001 (aged 22)	6	0	(Royal Spanish Football Federation) Peña Deportiva
15	MF	**Fabian Messina**	16 September 2002 (aged 21)	5	0	(German Football Association) FSV Frankfurt
16	DF	Nelson Lemaire	19 October 2001 (aged 22)	0	0	(Royal Belgian Football Association) Union Saint-Gilloise
17	FW	José de León	2 March 2004 (aged 20)	1	0	(Royal Spanish Football Federation) Alavés
18	FW	**Nowend Lorenzo** (captain)	2 November 2002 (aged 21)	4	0	(Royal Spanish Football Federation) Osasuna
20	DF	Thomas Jungbauer	30 July 2005 (aged 18)	3	0	(Football Association of the Czech Republic) Dynamo České Budějovice

* Overage player.

Group play

Pos	Team	Pld	W	D	L	GF	GA	GD	Pts	Qualification
1	Egypt	3	2	1	0	3	1	+2	**7**	Advance to knockout stage
2	Spain	3	2	0	1	6	4	+2	**6**	Advance to knockout stage
3	Dominican Republic	3	0	2	1	2	4	−2	**2**	
4	Uzbekistan	3	0	1	2	2	4	−2	**1**	

Source: FIFA
Rules for classification: Group stage tiebreakers
24 July 2024
17:00

Egypt	0–0	Dominican Republic
	Report

Stade de la Beaujoire, Nantes
Attendance: 13,945
Referee: Yoshimi Yamashita (Japan)

27 July 2024
15:00

Dominican Republic	1–3	Spain
Montes de Oca 38'	Report	Fermín 24'; Baena 55'; Gutiérrez 70'

Stade de Bordeaux, Bordeaux
Attendance: 16,099
Referee: Adel Al-Naqbi (United Arab Emirates)

30 July 2024
15:00

Dominican Republic	1–1	Uzbekistan
Núñez 51' (pen.)	Report	Odilov 58'

Parc des Princes, Paris
Attendance: 30,475
Referee: Mahmood Ismail (Sudan)

== Gymnastics ==
=== Artistic ===
Dominican Republic qualified one gymnast, Audrys Nin Reyes, by being among the highest-ranked eligible athlete in the All-around at the 2023 Pan Am Games in Santiago, Chile.

Men

Athlete	Event	Qualification								Final							
Athlete	Event	Apparatus						Total	Rank	Apparatus						Total	Rank
Athlete	Event	F	PH	R	V	PB	HB	Total	Rank	F	PH	R	V	PB	HB	Total	Rank
Audrys Nin Reyes	Vault	—N/a			13.983	—N/a	11.400	—N/a									

== Judo ==
Dominican Republic qualified one judoka for the following weight class at the Games. Robert Florentino (men's middleweight, 90 kg) got qualified via continental quota based on Olympic point rankings.

Athlete	Event	Round of 64	Round of 32	Round of 16	Quarterfinals	Semifinals	Repechage	Final / BM	
Athlete	Event	Opposition Result	Opposition Result	Opposition Result	Opposition Result	Opposition Result	Opposition Result	Opposition Result	Rank
Robert Florentino	Men's −90 kg	—N/a	Tselidis (GRE); **L** 00-10	Did not advance					
Moira Morillo	Women's +78 kg	—N/a	Barbari Zharfi (EOR); **W** 10-00	Kim (KOR); **L** 00-10	Did not advance				

== Shooting ==
For the first time since 2016, Dominican Republic shooters achieved quota places for the following events based on their results at the 2022 and 2023 ISSF World Championships, 2023 African Championships, and 2024 ISSF World Olympic Qualification Tournament.

Athlete	Event	Qualification		Semifinal		Final	
Athlete	Event	Points	Rank	Points	Rank	Points	Rank
Eduardo Lorenzo	Men's trap	119	20	Did not advance			

== Swimming ==
Dominican Republic swimmers achieved entry standards in the following events for Paris 2024 (a maximum of two swimmers under the Olympic Qualifying Time (OST) and potentially at the Olympic Consideration Time (OCT)):

Athlete	Event	Heat		Semifinal		Final	
Athlete	Event	Time	Rank	Time	Rank	Time	Rank
Javier Núñez	Men's 100 m freestyle	51.55	57	Did not advance			
Elizabeth Jiménez	Women's 100 m backstroke	1:04.99	33	Did not advance			

== Taekwondo ==
Domenican Republic qualified two athlete to compete at the 2024 Olympic Games. Bernardo Pié (men's 68 kg) and Madelyn Rodríguez (women's 67 kg) secured their spot in their respective division, after winning the semifinal match, through the 2024 Pan American Olympic Qualification Tournament, in Santo Domingo, Dominican Republic.

Athlete	Event	Qualification	Round of 16	Quarterfinals	Semifinals	Repechage	Final / BM	
Athlete	Event	Opposition Result	Opposition Result	Opposition Result	Opposition Result	Opposition Result	Opposition Result	Rank
Bernardo Pié	Men's −68 kg	Bye	Golubić (CRO); **L** 0–2	Did not advance				
Madelyn Rodríguez	Women's −67 kg	—N/a	Chaâri (BEL); **L** 0–2	Did not advance				

== Volleyball ==
=== Indoor ===
Summary

Team	Event	Group stage				Quarterfinal	Semifinal	Final / BM	
Team	Event	Opposition Score	Opposition Score	Opposition Score	Rank	Opposition Score	Opposition Score	Opposition Score	Rank
Dominican Republic women's	Women's tournament	Italy; **L** 1–3	Turkey; **L** 1–3	Netherlands; **W** 3–1	3	Brazil; **L** 0–3	Did not advance		8

==== Women's tournament ====
Dominican Republic women's volleyball team qualified for the Olympics by winning the Pool A round and securing one of two available berth at the 2023 Women's Olympic Qualification Tournaments in Ningbo, China.

Team roster

The roster was announced on 8 July 2024.

On July 26, Lisvel Elisa Eve was suspended from the tournament after admitting to take a medication that contained furosemide. She was then replaced by the alternate player, Geraldine González.

Head coach: (Brazil) Marcos Kwiek

- 1 Cándida Arias MB
- 5 Brenda Castillo L
- 6 Ariana Rodríguez S
- 7 Niverka Marte (c) S
- 8 Alondra Tapia OP
- 11 Geraldine González MB
- 15 Madeline Guillén OH
- 16 Yonkaira Peña OH
- 18 Bethania de la Cruz OH
- 20 Brayelin Martínez OH
- 21 Jineiry Martínez MB
- 23 Gaila González OP

Group play

Pos	Team	Pld	W	L	Pts	SW	SL	SR	SPW	SPL	SPR	Qualification
1	Italy	3	**3**	0	9	9	1	9.000	253	199	1.271	Quarter-finals
2	Turkey	3	**2**	1	5	6	6	1.000	250	262	0.954	Quarter-finals
3	Dominican Republic	3	**1**	2	3	5	7	0.714	264	284	0.930	Quarter-finals
4	Netherlands	3	**0**	3	1	3	9	0.333	260	282	0.922	

Source: Olympics
Rules for classification: Tiebreakers

28 July 2024; 09:00	**Italy**	**3–1**	Dominican Republic	South Paris Arena 1, Paris; Attendance: 9,368; Referees: Nurper Özbar (TUR), Angela Grass (BRA)
28 July 2024; 09:00	(25–19, 24–26, 25–21, 25–18); P2 Report			South Paris Arena 1, Paris; Attendance: 9,368; Referees: Nurper Özbar (TUR), Angela Grass (BRA)

1 August 2024; 09:00	**Turkey**	**3–1**	Dominican Republic	South Paris Arena 1, Paris; Attendance: 9,465; Referees: Karina Rene (ARG), Fabrice Collados (FRA)
1 August 2024; 09:00	(21–25, 25–18, 25–22, 25–15); P2 Report			South Paris Arena 1, Paris; Attendance: 9,465; Referees: Karina Rene (ARG), Fabrice Collados (FRA)

3 August 2024; 09:00	Netherlands	**1–3**	**Dominican Republic**	South Paris Arena 1, Paris; Attendance: 9,433; Referees: Scott Dziewirz (CAN), Ivaylo Ivanov (BUL)
3 August 2024; 09:00	(25–22, 21–25, 17–25, 26–28); P2 Report			South Paris Arena 1, Paris; Attendance: 9,433; Referees: Scott Dziewirz (CAN), Ivaylo Ivanov (BUL)

Quarterfinal

6 August 2024; 13:00	**Brazil**	**3–0**	Dominican Republic	South Paris Arena 1, Paris; Attendance: 9,315; Referees: Sumie Myoi (JPN), Stefano Cesare (ITA)
6 August 2024; 13:00	(25–22, 25–13, 25–17); P2 Report			South Paris Arena 1, Paris; Attendance: 9,315; Referees: Sumie Myoi (JPN), Stefano Cesare (ITA)

== Weightlifting ==
Dominican Republic qualified three weightlifters into the Olympic competition. Beatriz Pirón (Women's 49 kg), Yudelina Mejía (Women's 81kg) and Crismery Santana (women's +81 kg) secured one of the top ten slots, each in their respective weight divisions based on the IWF Olympic Qualification Rankings.

Athlete	Event	Snatch		Clean & jerk		Total	Rank
Athlete	Event	Result	Rank	Result	Rank	Total	Rank
Beatriz Pirón	Women's −49 kg	85	6	107	7	192	7
Yudelina Mejía	Women's −81 kg	111	5	145	3	256	5
Crismery Santana	Women's +81 kg	118	7	140	11	258	9

== Wrestling ==
Dominican Republic qualified one wrestler for the following events. Luis Miguel Pérez, qualified for the games, by advancing to the final match in his division, through the 2024 Pan American Wrestling Olympic Qualification Tournament in Acapulco, Mexico.

Key:

- VT (ranking points: 5–0 or 0–5) – Victory by fall.
- VB (ranking points: 5–0 or 0–5) – Victory by injury (VF for forfeit, VA for withdrawal or disqualification)
- PP (ranking points: 3–1 or 1–3) – Decision by points – the loser with technical points.
- PO (ranking points: 3–0 or 0–3) – Decision by points – the loser without technical points.
- ST (ranking points: 4–0 or 0–4) – Great superiority – the loser without technical points and a margin of victory of at least 8 (Greco-Roman) or 10 (freestyle) points.
- SP (ranking points: 4–1 or 1–4) – Technical superiority – the loser with technical points and a margin of victory of at least 8 (Greco-Roman) or 10 (freestyle) points.

Freestyle

Athlete	Event	Round of 16	Quarterfinal	Semifinal	Repechage	Final / BM	
Athlete	Event	Opposition Result	Opposition Result	Opposition Result	Opposition Result	Opposition Result	Rank
Luis Miguel Pérez	Men's −97 kg	Magomedov (AZE); **L** 0–9 ^{PO}	Did not advance				

== See also ==
- Dominican Republic at the 2023 Pan American Games
