= Dominican Republic at the 1976 Summer Olympics =

- Flag of the Dominican Republic
- IOC code: DOM
- NOC: Dominican Republic Olympic Committee

in Montreal
- Competitors: 2
- Flag bearer: Eleoncio Mercedes
- Medals: Gold 0 Silver 0 Bronze 0 Total 0

Summer Olympics appearances (overview)
- 1964; 1968; 1972; 1976; 1980; 1984; 1988; 1992; 1996; 2000; 2004; 2008; 2012; 2016; 2020; 2024

The Dominican Republic competed at the 1976 Summer Olympics in Montreal, Quebec, Canada.

== Results by event ==
=== Athletics ===
Men's 800 metres

- Francisco Solis
  - Heat — 1:55.56 (→ did not advance)

=== Boxing ===
Men's Light Flyweight (– 48 kg)

- Eleoncio Mercedes
  1. First Round — Lost to Aleksandr Tkachenko (URS), RSC-1
