= Dominican Republic at the 2016 Summer Olympics =

- Flag of the Dominican Republic
- IOC code: DOM
- NOC: Dominican Republic Olympic Committee
- Website: www.colimdo.org (in Spanish)

in Rio de Janeiro
- Competitors: 29 in 11 sports
- Flag bearer: Luguelín Santos
- Medals Ranked 78th: Gold 0 Silver 0 Bronze 1 Total 1

Summer Olympics appearances (overview)
- 1964; 1968; 1972; 1976; 1980; 1984; 1988; 1992; 1996; 2000; 2004; 2008; 2012; 2016; 2020; 2024

Dominican Republic competed at the 2016 Summer Olympics in Rio de Janeiro, Brazil, from 5 to 21 August 2016. This was the nation's fourteenth consecutive appearance at the Summer Olympics.

The Dominican Republic Olympic Committee (Spanish: Comité Olímpico Dominicano, COD) sent a team of 29 athletes, 21 men and 8 women, to compete in eleven different sports at the Games. The nation's full roster was smaller by six athletes than in London 2012, and also featured its highest number of male participants in Olympic history since 1992. Among the sports represented by the nation's athletes, Dominican Republic made its Olympic debut in archery, road cycling, equestrian, and tennis.

Seven athletes from the Dominican Republic previously competed in London at the 2012 Olympics, including weightlifters Beatriz Pirón and Yuderqui Contreras, American-based freestyle swimmer Dorian McMenemy, and sprinter and former Youth Olympian Luguelín Santos, who earned a silver in the men's 400 metres. The lone returning medalist from the previous Games, Santos was selected to lead the Dominican Republic delegation as the flag bearer in the opening ceremony.

Dominican Republic left Rio de Janeiro with only a bronze medal, won by taekwondo fighter Luisito Pie in the men's flyweight category (58 kg). Several of the nation's athletes narrowly missed out of the podium in their respective sporting events, including Pirón (fourth, women's 48 kg), Contreras (sixth, women's 58 kg), fellow weightlifter Luis García (eighth, men's 56 kg), and half-lightweight judoka Wander Mateo (seventh, men's 66 kg).

== Medalists ==
Medal	Name	Sport	Event	Date
Bronze	Luisito Pie	Taekwondo	Men's 58 kg	17 August

== Archery ==
One archer from the Dominican Republic has qualified for the women's individual recurve at the Olympics by securing one of three available Olympic spots at the Pan American Qualification Tournament in Medellín, Colombia.

Athlete	Event	Ranking round		Round of 64	Round of 32	Round of 16	Quarterfinals	Semifinals	Final / BM	
Athlete	Event	Score	Seed	Opposition Score	Opposition Score	Opposition Score	Opposition Score	Opposition Score	Opposition Score	Rank
Yessica Camilo	Women's individual	525	64	Choi M-s (KOR); L 0–6	Did not advance					

== Athletics (track and field) ==
Dominican Republic athletes have so far achieved qualifying standards in the following athletics events (up to a maximum of 3 athletes in each event):

Key

- Note–Ranks given for track events are within the athlete's heat only
- Q = Qualified for the next round
- q = Qualified for the next round as a fastest loser or, in field events, by position without achieving the qualifying target
- NR = National record
- N/A = Round not applicable for the event
- Bye = Athlete not required to compete in round

Track & road events
Men

Athlete	Event	Heat		Semifinal		Final	
Athlete	Event	Result	Rank	Result	Rank	Result	Rank
Stanly del Carmen	200 m	20.55	6	Did not advance			
Yancarlos Martínez	200 m	20.97	7	Did not advance			
Gustavo Cuesta	400 m	46.92	7	Did not advance			
Luguelín Santos	400 m	45.61	2 Q	44.71 SB	4	Did not advance	
Yohandris Andújar; Mayobanex de Óleo; Stanly del Carmen; Yancarlos Martínez; Christopher Valdez	4 × 100 m relay	DSQ		—N/a		Did not advance	
Luis Charles; Gustavo Cuesta; Máximo Mercedes; Juander Santos; Luguelín Santos; Yon Soriano	4 × 400 m relay	3:01.76	5	—N/a		Did not advance	

Women

Athlete	Event	Heat		Semifinal		Final	
Athlete	Event	Result	Rank	Result	Rank	Result	Rank
Mariely Sánchez	200 m	23.39	7	Did not advance			

Field events

Athlete	Event	Qualification		Final	
Athlete	Event	Distance	Position	Distance	Position
Ana José Tima	Women's triple jump	13.61	27	Did not advance	

== Boxing ==
Dominican Republic has entered two boxers to compete in each of the following weight classes into the Olympic boxing tournament. Leonel de los Santos had claimed his Olympic spot at the 2016 American Qualification Tournament in Buenos Aires, Argentina. Meanwhile, bantamweight boxer Héctor García secured an additional place on the Dominican Republic roster with his semifinal triumph at the 2016 APB and WSB Olympic Qualifier in Vargas, Venezuela.

Athlete	Event	Round of 32	Round of 16	Quarterfinals	Semifinals	Final	
Athlete	Event	Opposition Result	Opposition Result	Opposition Result	Opposition Result	Opposition Result	Rank
Leonel de los Santos	Men's flyweight	Finol (VEN); L 0–3	Did not advance				
Héctor García	Men's bantamweight	Asanau (BLR); L 1–2	Did not advance				

== Cycling ==
=== Road ===
Dominican Republic has qualified one rider in the men's Olympic road race by virtue of his individual ranking among the next two best ranked NOCs at the 2015 Pan American Championships, signifying the country's Olympic debut in the sport.

Athlete	Event	Time	Rank
Diego Milán	Men's road race	Did not finish	

== Equestrian ==
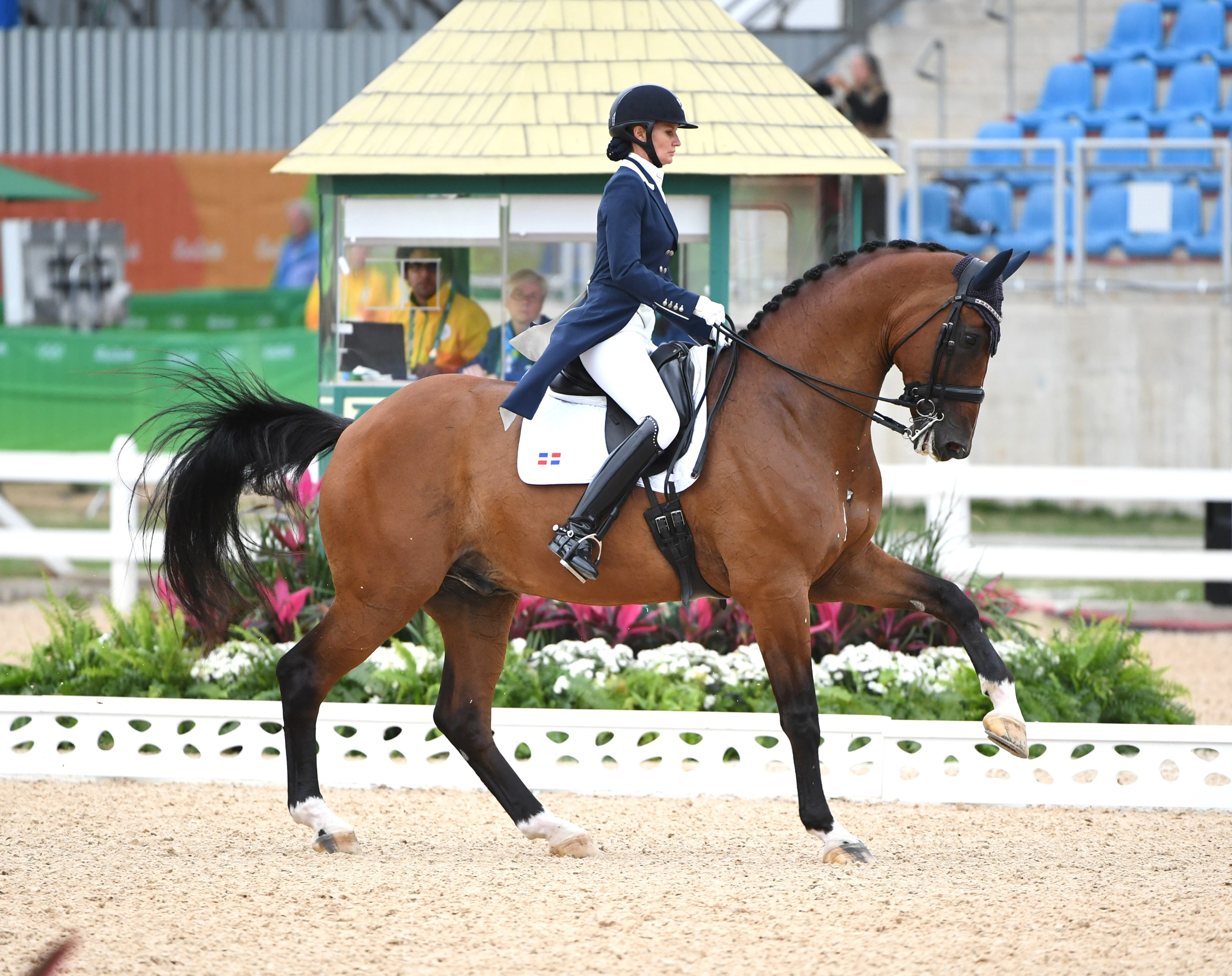
Yvonne Losos de Muñiz and Foco Loco competing at the National Equestrian Center

Dominican Republic has entered one dressage rider into the Olympic equestrian competition by virtue of a top finish from Central & South America in the individual FEI Olympic rankings, signifying the nation's Olympic debut in the sport.

=== Dressage ===
Athlete	Horse	Event	Grand Prix		Grand Prix Special		Grand Prix Freestyle		Overall	
Athlete	Horse	Event	Score	Rank	Score	Rank	Technical	Artistic	Score	Rank
Yvonne Losos de Muñiz	Foco Loco	Individual	61.300	59	Did not advance					

== Judo ==
Dominican Republic has qualified one judoka for the men's half-lightweight category (66 kg) at the Games. Wander Mateo earned a continental quota spot from the Pan American region as Dominican Republic's top-ranked judoka outside of direct qualifying position in the IJF World Ranking List of 30 May 2016.

Athlete	Event	Round of 64	Round of 32	Round of 16	Quarterfinals	Semifinals	Repechage	Final / BM	
Athlete	Event	Opposition Result	Opposition Result	Opposition Result	Opposition Result	Opposition Result	Opposition Result	Opposition Result	Rank
Wander Mateo	Men's −66 kg	Bye	Kuku (COD); W 010–000	Oleinic (POR); W 100–000	Ebinuma (JPN); L 000–111	Did not advance	Sobirov (UZB); L 000–100	Did not advance	7

== Shooting ==
Dominican Republic has qualified one shooter in the men's trap by virtue of his best finish at the American Continental Championships and other selection competitions, as long as he obtained a minimum qualifying score (MQS) by 31 March 2016.

Athlete	Event	Qualification		Semifinal		Final	
Athlete	Event	Points	Rank	Points	Rank	Points	Rank
Eduardo Lorenzo	Men's trap	114	20	Did not advance			

Qualification Legend: Q = Qualify for the next round; q = Qualify for the bronze medal (shotgun)

== Swimming ==
Dominican Republic has received a Universality invitation from FINA to send two swimmers (one male and one female) to the Olympics.

Athlete	Event	Heat		Semifinal		Final	
Athlete	Event	Time	Rank	Time	Rank	Time	Rank
Jhonny Pérez	Men's 100 m freestyle	51.50	52	Did not advance			
Dorian McMenemy	Women's 50 m freestyle	27.37	55	Did not advance			

== Taekwondo ==
Dominican Republic entered three athletes into the taekwondo competition at the Olympics. 2015 Pan American silver medalist Luis Pie, and newcomers Moisés Hernández and Katherine Rodríguez secured the spots each in the men's flyweight (58 kg), men's welterweight (80 kg), and women's heavyweight (+67 kg) category, respectively, by virtue of their top two finish at the 2016 Pan American Qualification Tournament in Aguascalientes, Mexico.

Athlete	Event	Round of 16	Quarterfinals	Semifinals	Repechage	Final / BM	
Athlete	Event	Opposition Result	Opposition Result	Opposition Result	Opposition Result	Opposition Result	Rank
Luisito Pie	Men's −58 kg	Tuncat (GER); W DSQ	Bragança (POR); W 4–1	Hanprab (THA); L 7–11	Bye	Tortosa (ESP); W 6–5 SUD	3rd place, bronze medalist(s)
Moisés Hernández	Men's −80 kg	Güleç (GER); L 2–4	Did not advance				
Katherine Rodríguez	Women's +67 kg	Dislam (MAR); L 1–5	Did not advance				

== Tennis ==
Dominican Republic has entered one tennis player for the first time into the Olympic tournament. Víctor Estrella Burgos (world no. 78) qualified directly for the men's singles as one of the top 56 eligible players in the ATP World Rankings as of 6 June 2016.

Athlete	Event	Round of 64	Round of 32	Round of 16	Quarterfinals	Semifinals	Final / BM	
Athlete	Event	Opposition Score	Opposition Score	Opposition Score	Opposition Score	Opposition Score	Opposition Score	Rank
Víctor Estrella Burgos	Men's singles	Fognini (ITA); L 6–2, 6–7^{(4–7)}, 0–6	Did not advance					

== Weightlifting ==
Weightlifters from the Dominican Republic have qualified two women's quota places for the Rio Olympics based on their combined team standing by points at the 2014 and 2015 IWF World Championships. A single men's Olympic spot had been added to the Dominican Republic roster by virtue of a top seven national finish at the 2016 Pan American Championships. The team must allocate these places to individual athletes by 20 June 2016.

Athlete	Event	Snatch		Clean & Jerk		Total	Rank
Athlete	Event	Result	Rank	Result	Rank	Total	Rank
Luis García	Men's −56 kg	118	9	145	9	263	8
Beatriz Pirón	Women's −48 kg	85	2	102	5	187	4
Yuderqui Contreras	Women's −58 kg	100	5	117	6	217	6

== See also ==
- Dominican Republic at the 2015 Pan American Games
- Dominican Republic at the 2016 Summer Paralympics
