= Dominican Republic at the 1972 Summer Olympics =

- Flag of the Dominican Republic
- IOC code: DOM
- NOC: Dominican Republic Olympic Committee

in Munich
- Competitors: 5 in 3 sports
- Medals: Gold 0 Silver 0 Bronze 0 Total 0

Summer Olympics appearances (overview)
- 1964; 1968; 1972; 1976; 1980; 1984; 1988; 1992; 1996; 2000; 2004; 2008; 2012; 2016; 2020; 2024

The Dominican Republic competed at the 1972 Summer Olympics in Munich, West Germany. This was the nation's third appearance, after debuting in 1964. Five competitors, all men, took part in four events in three sports.

== Judo ==
63 kg:

- Juan Chalas – Round of 32 (→ Did not advance)

80 kg:

- Carlos Socias – Round of 32 (→ Did not advance)

== Shooting ==
Two male shooters represented the Dominican Republic in 1972.

Skeet

- Riad Yunes
- Domingo Lorenzo

== Weightlifting ==
Athlete	Event	Military Press		Snatch		Jerk		Total	Rank
Athlete	Event	Result	Rank	Result	Rank	Result	Rank	Total	Rank
Emilio Berroa	Men's −82.5 kg	127.5	20	122.5	16	157.5	16	407.5	17
