= Dominican Republic at the 1996 Summer Olympics =

- Flag of the Dominican Republic
- IOC code: DOM
- NOC: Dominican Republic Olympic Committee
- Website: www.colimdo.org (in Spanish)

in Atlanta
- Competitors: 16 (12 men and 4 women) in 7 sports
- Flag bearer: Joan Guzmán
- Medals: Gold 0 Silver 0 Bronze 0 Total 0

Summer Olympics appearances (overview)
- 1964; 1968; 1972; 1976; 1980; 1984; 1988; 1992; 1996; 2000; 2004; 2008; 2012; 2016; 2020; 2024

The Dominican Republic competed at the 1996 Summer Olympics in Atlanta, United States.

== Competitors ==
The following is the list of number of competitors in the Games.

Sport	Men	Women	Total
Athletics	2	1	3
Boxing	6	–	6
Judo	2	1	3
Table tennis	0	1	1
Tennis	0	1	1
Weightlifting	1	–	1
Wrestling	1	–	1
Total	12	4	16

== Athletics ==
Men
Track and road events

Athlete	Event	Heats		Quarterfinal		Semifinal		Final	
Athlete	Event	Result	Rank	Result	Rank	Result	Rank	Result	Rank
Adalberto Mendez	100 metres	10.60	69	Did not advance					

Field events

Athlete	Event	Qualification		Final	
Athlete	Event	Distance	Position	Distance	Position
Julio Luciano	High jump	2.20	25	Did not advance	

Women
Field events

Athlete	Event	Qualification		Final	
Athlete	Event	Distance	Position	Distance	Position
Juana Arrendel	High jump	1.80	27	Did not advance	

== Boxing ==
Athlete	Event	Round of 32	Round of 16	Quarterfinals	Semifinals	Final	
Athlete	Event	Opposition Result	Opposition Result	Opposition Result	Opposition Result	Opposition Result	Rank
José Pérez Reyes	Light flyweight	Bornei (ROU); L 10–16	Did not advance				
Joan Guzmán	Flyweight	Narváez (ARG); L 4–9	Did not advance				
John Nolasco	Bantamweight	Naraina (MRI); W 18–14	Nafil (MAR); L 6–18	Did not advance			
Miguel Mojica	Lightweight	Üitümen (MGL); L 1–7	Did not advance				
Rogelio Martínez	Welterweight	Al (DEN); L RSC R1	Did not advance				
Gabriel Hernández	Light heavyweight	Botes (RSA); L 11–16	Did not advance				

== Judo ==
Men

Athlete	Event	Round of 64	Round of 32	Round of 16	Quarterfinals	Semifinals	Repechage			Final	
Athlete	Event	Round of 64	Round of 32	Round of 16	Quarterfinals	Semifinals	Round 1	Round 2	Round 3	Final	
Athlete	Event	Opposition Result	Opposition Result	Opposition Result	Opposition Result	Opposition Result	Opposition Result	Opposition Result	Opposition Result	Opposition Result	Rank
Francis Figuereo	–65 kg	Bye	Quellmalz (GER); L	Did not advance			Hernández (CUB); L	Did not advance			
José Augusto Geraldino	+95 kg	Bye	Kosorotov (RUS); L	Did not advance							

Women

Athlete	Event	Round of 32	Round of 16	Quarterfinals	Semifinals	Repechage			Final	
Athlete	Event	Round of 32	Round of 16	Quarterfinals	Semifinals	Round 1	Round 2	Round 3	Final	
Athlete	Event	Opposition Result	Opposition Result	Opposition Result	Opposition Result	Opposition Result	Opposition Result	Opposition Result	Opposition Result	Rank
Dulce Piña	–66 kg	Bye	Chery (MRI); W	Cho (KOR); L	Did not advance	—N/a	Wang (CHN); L	Did not advance		

== Table tennis ==
Women

Athlete	Event	Group Stage				Round of 16	Quarterfinal	Semifinal	Final	
Athlete	Event	Opposition Result	Opposition Result	Opposition Result	Rank	Opposition Result	Opposition Result	Opposition Result	Opposition Result	Rank
Blanca Alejo	Singles	Koyama (JPN); L 0–2	Palina (RUS); L 0–2	Dobešová (CZE); L 0–2	4	Did not advance				

== Tennis ==
Women

Athlete	Event	Round of 64	Round of 32	Round of 16	Quarterfinals	Semifinals	Final	
Athlete	Event	Opposition Result	Opposition Result	Opposition Result	Opposition Result	Opposition Result	Opposition Result	Rank
Joelle Schad	Singles	Hingis (SUI); L 0–6, 1–6	Did not advance					

== Weightlifting ==
Athlete	Event	Snatch		Clean & jerk		Total	Rank
Athlete	Event	Result	Rank	Result	Rank	Total	Rank
Alfonso Grullart	–64 kg	115.0	29	145.0	29	260.0	30

== Wrestling ==
Greco-Roman

Athlete	Event	Round of 32	Round of 16	Quarterfinals	Semifinals	Repechage					Final	
Athlete	Event	Round of 32	Round of 16	Quarterfinals	Semifinals	Round 1	Round 2	Round 3	Round 4	Round 5	Final	
Athlete	Event	Opposition Result	Opposition Result	Opposition Result	Opposition Result	Opposition Result	Opposition Result	Opposition Result	Opposition Result	Opposition Result	Opposition Result	Rank
Ulises Valentin	–52 kg	Akhmedov (BLR); L 0–11	Did not advance			Basaldúa (PER); W Fall	Jabłoński (POL); L Fall	Did not advance				

== See also ==
- Dominican Republic at the 1995 Pan American Games
