= Dominican Republic at the 1984 Summer Olympics =

- Flag of the Dominican Republic
- IOC code: DOM
- NOC: Dominican Republic Olympic Committee

in Los Angeles
- Competitors: 19
- Flag bearer: Pedro Nolasco
- Medals Ranked 43rd: Gold 0 Silver 0 Bronze 1 Total 1

Summer Olympics appearances (overview)
- 1964; 1968; 1972; 1976; 1980; 1984; 1988; 1992; 1996; 2000; 2004; 2008; 2012; 2016; 2020; 2024

The Dominican Republic competed at the 1984 Summer Olympics in Los Angeles, United States. The nation won its first Olympic medal at these Games.

== Medalists ==
Medal	Name	Sport	Event	Date
Bronze	Pedro Nolasco	Boxing	Men's bantamweight	9 August

== Results by event ==
=== Athletics ===
Men's 5,000 metres

- Ruddy Cornielle
  - Heat — 17:16.77 (→ did not advance)

Men's 110 metres hurdles

- Modesto Castillo
  - Heat — 14.05 (→ did not advance)

Women's 100 metres

- Divina Estrella
  - Heat — 12.25 (→ did not advance)

=== Boxing ===
Men's Light Flyweight (– 48 kg)

- Jesús Beltre
  1. First Round – Bye
  2. Second Round – Lost to Rafael Ramos (Puerto Rico), 1-4

Men's Bantamweight (– 54 kg)

- Pedro Nolasco → Bronze Medal
  1. First Round — Defeated Ljubiša Simič (Yugoslavia), 4-1
  2. Second Round — Defeated John Siryakibbe (Uganda), 5-0
  3. Third Round — Defeated Juan Molina (Puerto Rico), 3-2
  4. Quarterfinals — Defeated Moon Sung-Kil (South Korea), referee stopped contest in first round
  5. Semifinals — Lost to Maurizio Stecca (Italy), 0-5

=== Diving ===
Men's 3m Springboard

- Fernando Henderson
  - Preliminary Round — 492.15 (→ did not advance, 19th place)
- Reynaldo Castro
  - Preliminary Round — 485.16 (→ did not advance, 20th place)

== Sources ==
- Official Olympic Reports
- International Olympic Committee results database
