= Dominican Republic at the 2000 Summer Olympics =

- Flag of the Dominican Republic
- IOC code: DOM
- NOC: Dominican Republic Olympic Committee
- Website: www.colimdo.org (in Spanish)

in Sydney
- Competitors: 13 (11 men and 2 women) in 5 sports
- Flag bearer: Wanda Rijo
- Medals: Gold 0 Silver 0 Bronze 0 Total 0

Summer Olympics appearances (overview)
- 1964; 1968; 1972; 1976; 1980; 1984; 1988; 1992; 1996; 2000; 2004; 2008; 2012; 2016; 2020; 2024

The Dominican Republic competed at the 2000 Summer Olympics in Sydney, Australia. No Dominican athletes were medalists in any events.

== Competitors ==
The following is the list of number of competitors in the Games.

Sport	Men	Women	Total
Athletics	2	0	2
Boxing	3	–	3
Judo	4	1	5
Swimming	1	0	1
Weightlifting	1	1	2
Total	11	2	13

== Athletics ==
Key

- Note–Ranks given for track events are within the athlete's heat only
- Q = Qualified for the next round
- q = Qualified for the next round as a fastest loser or, in field events, by position without achieving the qualifying target
- NR = National record
- N/A = Round not applicable for the event
- Bye = Athlete not required to compete in round

Men
Track & road events

Athlete	Event	Round 1		Round 2		Semifinal		Final	
Athlete	Event	Result	Rank	Result	Rank	Result	Rank	Result	Rank
Carlos Santa	400 m	46.40	39	did not advance					
Félix Sánchez	400 m hurdles	49.70	13 q	—		49.69	20	did not advance	

== Boxing ==
Athlete	Event	Round of 32	Round of 16	Quarterfinals	Semifinals	Final	
Athlete	Event	Opposition Result	Opposition Result	Opposition Result	Opposition Result	Opposition Result	Rank
Yovanny Lorenzo	Welterweight	Khan (PAK); W 5–4	Küchler (GER); L RSC-R3	did not advance			
Juan José Ubaldo	Light middleweight	Rowles (AUS); L 7–16	did not advance				
Jerson Ravelo	Middleweight	Miller (AUS); L 7–8	did not advance				

== Judo ==
Men

Athlete	Event	Round of 32	Round of 16	Quarterfinals	Semifinals	Final	Repechage 1	Repechage 2	Repechage 3	Bronze
Athlete	Event	Opposition Result	Opposition Result	Opposition Result	Opposition Result	Opposition Result	Opposition Result	Opposition Result	Opposition Result	Opposition Result
Juan Carlos Jacinto	-60 kg	Rebahi (ALG); L	did not advance							
Vicbart Geraldino	-90 kg	Croitoru (ROU); L	did not advance							
José Augusto Geraldino	-100 kg	Birkfellner (AUT); L	did not advance							
José Vásquez	+100 kg	Berduta (KAZ); L	did not advance							

Women

Athlete	Event	Round of 32	Round of 16	Quarterfinals	Semifinals	Final	Repechage 1	Repechage 2	Repechage 3	Bronze
Athlete	Event	Opposition Result	Opposition Result	Opposition Result	Opposition Result	Opposition Result	Opposition Result	Opposition Result	Opposition Result	Opposition Result
Eleucadia Vargas	-63 kg	Ji K-s (PRK); L	did not advance							

== Swimming ==
Men

Athlete	Events	Heat		Semifinal		Final	
Athlete	Events	Time	Rank	Time	Rank	Time	Rank
Guillermo Cabrera	200 m backstroke	2:08.22	41	did not advance			

== Weightlifting ==
Athlete	Event	Snatch		Clean & Jerk		Total	
Athlete	Event	Weight	Rank	Weight	Rank	Weight	Rank
Plaiter Reyes	Men's +105 kg	157.5	21	195.0	21	352.5	21
Wanda Rijo	Women's –75 kg	95.0	=9	120.0	=7	215.0	8
