= Gabriel Mercedes =

Domician taekwondo practitioner (born 1979)

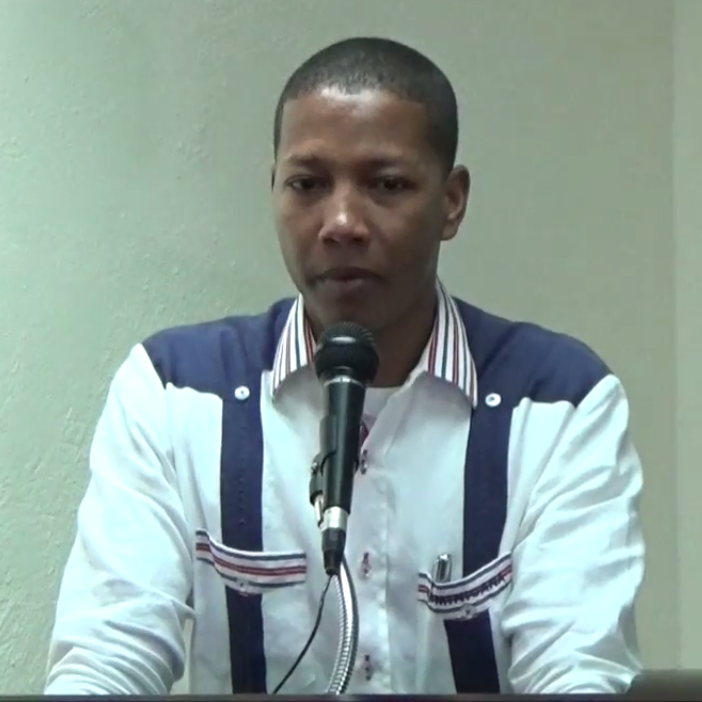
- Mercedes in 2019

Personal information
- Full name: Yulis Gabriel Mercedes Reyes
- Born: 12 November 1979 (age 46) Monte Plata, Monte Plata Province, Dominican Republic
- Height: 163 cm (5 ft 4 in)
- Weight: 58 kg (128 lb)
Medal record
Men's taekwondo
Representing the Dominican Republic
Olympic Games
Silver medal – second place	2008 Beijing	58 kg
World Championships
Bronze medal – third place	1999 Edmonton	54 kg
Bronze medal – third place	2011 Gyeongju	58 kg
Pan American Games
Gold medal – first place	2007 Rio de Janeiro	58 kg
Gold medal – first place	2011 Guadalajara	58 kg
Bronze medal – third place	2003 Santo Domingo	58 kg
Central American and Caribbean Games
Gold medal – first place	2002 San Salvador	54 kg
Gold medal – first place	2010 Mayaguez	58 kg

Yulis Gabriel Mercedes Reyes (Note: In this Spanish name, the first or paternal surname is Mercedes and the second or maternal family name is Reyes.) (born 12 November 1979, in Monte Plata, Monte Plata Province) is a Dominican taekwondo practitioner and Olympic medalist.

He won a silver medal in the – 58 kg class at the 2008 Summer Olympics in Beijing, after tying with Guillermo Pérez of Mexico, but losing by a judge's decision.

He carried the flag for his delegation at the 2012 Summer Olympics in London. He was favored to win his county's third medal at these games. He competed in the Men's 58 kg (flyweight). He lasted one round and a half. A bad move shattered the meniscus and the anterior cruciate ligament in his right knee. He kept fighting with evident pain, before he limped away in tears.

== See also ==
- Dominican Republic at the 2004 Summer Olympics
- Dominican Republic at the 2008 Summer Olympics
- Dominican Republic at the 2012 Summer Olympics

== Notes ==
Olympic Games
Preceded by Félix Sánchez	Flagbearer for Dominican Republic; London 2012	Succeeded by Luguelín Santos
