= Dominican Republic at the 1964 Summer Olympics =

- IOC code: DOM
- NOC: Dominican Republic Olympic Committee

in Tokyo, Japan October 10, 1964 – October 24, 1964
- Competitors: 1 in 1 sport
- Flag bearer: Alberto Torres
- Medals: Gold 0 Silver 0 Bronze 0 Total 0

Summer Olympics appearances (overview)
- 1964; 1968; 1972; 1976; 1980; 1984; 1988; 1992; 1996; 2000; 2004; 2008; 2012; 2016; 2020; 2024

Dominican Republic competed at the 1964 Summer Olympics in Tokyo from 10 to 24 October 1964. It was the nation's debut appearance at the Summer Olympics. The Dominican Republic delegation consisted of a single athlete, who did not win a medal at the Games.

== Background ==
The Dominican Republic Olympic Committee was founded in 1946 to enable the country to participate in the Central American and Caribbean Games. It was re-established in its present form on 15 February 1962 and was approved by the International Olympic Committee (IOC) in 1962. The nation made its debut Olympic appearance at the 1964 Summer Olympics.

The 1964 Summer Olympics was held in Tokyo, Japan, between 10 and 24 October 1964. Alberto Torres was the country's flag bearer at the opening ceremony. Dominican Republic did not win a medal at the Games.

== Competitors ==
The Dominican Republic delegation consisted of a single athlete, Alberto Torres.

Sport	Men	Women	Total
Athletics	1	0	1
Total	1	0	1

== Athletics ==
Alberto Torres was the lone athlete representing Dominican Republic at the Games, and was the first Olympian from the nation. He participated in the men's 100 m event. Torres was born on 20 February 1934 at La Vega, and played other sports during his younger age before taking to athletics. He was nicknamed El Gringo. He set the Dominican national records in 100 and 200 metres in 1959, with the times of 10.4 and 21.4 seconds, respectively. He competed in the 1959 Pan American Games. He clocked a time of 10.7 seconds in 1963 to qualify for the Olympics.

The men's 100 metres race was held on 14 and 15 October 1964 at the Kokuritsu Kyogijo in Shinjuku. There were 73 participants representing 49 countries. In the tenth and final heat in the preliminary rounds, Torres ran in lane one. He clocked 10.9 seconds to finish sixth amongst the eight runners, and was about 0.4 seconds behind the winner Enrique Figuerola. As a result, he did not advance further.

Athlete	Event	Heats		Semifinals		Final	
Athlete	Event	Time	Rank	Time	Rank	Time	Rank
Alberto Torres	Men's 100 m	10.9	6	Did not advance			

== Sources ==
- Official Olympic Reports
