= Gilberto García (judoka) =

Dominican Republic judoka

Personal information
- Nationality: Dominican
- Born: 24 January 1969 (age 56)

Sport
- Sport: Judo

Gilberto García (born 24 January 1969) is a Dominican Republic judoka. He competed at the 1988 Summer Olympics and the 1992 Summer Olympics.
