= Flag of the Dominican Republic =

Dominican Republic
- Use: State and war flag, state and naval ensign
- Proportion: 2:3
- Adopted: 6 November 1863; 163 years ago
- Design: A white Saint George's Cross with the national coat of arms in the centre that divides the flag into four rectangles, blue and red at the top and red and blue at the bottom
- Designed by: Juan Pablo Duarte
- Use: Civil flag and ensign
- Design: Quarterly, the first and fourth quarters blue and the second and third quarters red, with a white Saint George's Cross overall

The national flag of the Dominican Republic is one of the official national symbols of the nation, along with the coat of arms and the national anthem. The blue on the flag stands for liberty, the white for salvation, and the red for the blood of heroes. The civil flag follows the same design, but without the charge in the center, which is the coat of arms of the Dominican Republic. The flag was designed by Juan Pablo Duarte.

Coat of arms of the Dominican Republic featured on the flag

== Description ==
The flag of the Dominican Republic is as described in Article 31 of the Dominican Constitution:

The National Flag is composed of the colors ultramarine blue and vermillion red, in alternating quarters, located in such a way that the blue is in the upper part of the flagpole, separated by a white cross half the width of the height of a quarter and that carries in its center the National Coat of Arms. The merchant flag is the same as the national, but without the Coat of Arms.

— Article 31, Chapter VII

Color scheme	Blue	Red	White
RGB	0,45,98	206,17,38	255,255,255
Hexadecimal	#002D62	#CE1126	#FFFFFF
CMYK	100 - 54 - 0 - 62	0 - 92 - 82 - 19	0 - 0 - 0 - 0

== History ==
The island of Hispaniola in the Greater Antilles of the Caribbean was “discovered” by explorer Christopher Columbus during his first voyage on December 5, 1492. Landing on the northwestern coast of the island in present day Haiti, he established La Navidad, the first European settlement in the Americas. During his second voyage in 1493, he established La Isabela, the first stable European settlement in the Americas, on the north-central coast of the island in present day Dominican Republic, after La Navidad was destroyed by the native Taíno people.

Sponsored by the Catholic Monarch of Spain, Columbus claimed Hispaniola for the Spanish Empire, the first European power to conquer and colonize the island. Concentrated in the eastern part of the island, the Spanish established the colony of Santo Domingo and its eponymous capital, the city of Santo Domingo, by 1496. After the Devastations of Osorio in 1605, the western part of the island was depopulated, facilitating the establishment of the colony of Saint-Domingue by the French Empire, beginning with the settlements of Tortuga in 1659 and Cap-Haïtien in 1670.

In 1804, the successful Haitian Revolution against France resulted in establishment of the First Empire of Haiti, the first independent country in Latin America. After the overthrow of the Haitian elective monarchy, the flag of Haiti was adopted by the succeeding Republic of Haiti in 1806. Featuring the coat of arms of the country over a blue and red horizontal stripe, the Haitian flag was based on the flag of France, a vertical tricolor of blue, white, and red adopted during the French Revolution against its ancien régime or absolute monarchy in 1794.

After gaining independence as the Republic of Spanish Haiti in 1821, the eastern colony of Santo Domingo was soon occupied and annexed by the Haitians, uniting the entire island of Hispaniola as the Republic of Haiti from 1822 to 1844. With the establishment of the revolutionary organization of La Trinitaria in 1838, which successfully fought against Haiti to liberate Santo Domingo as the independent First Dominican Republic, the flag of the country was first introduced. It featured a centered white cross, like the regimental flags of the Kingdom of France, over a horizontal blue stripe on top and red stripe on the bottom, like the flag of Haiti.

Designed by Juan Pablo Duarte, the Father of the Nation, it was first hoisted on February 28, 1844, the day after the beginning of the Dominican War of Independence against the Haiti. The ultramarine blue represented the protection of God over the country. The vermillion red color represented the blood shed by the patriots in the struggle for freedom of the country. The white cross in the center symbolized the peace and unity of the people of the country, Dominicans. The first flags were made by María Trinidad Sánchez, María de Jesús Pina, Isabel Sosa and Concepción Bona.

The flag was used until the four-year annexation of the Dominican Republic into the Spanish Empire from 1861 to 1865, during which period it was replaced by the flag of Spain. With the restoration of independence as the Second Dominican Republic, the flag was reintroduced with some changes. The coat of arms of the country was placed in the center of the flag at the intersection of the white cross, like the flag of Haiti. The position of the blue and red quarters on its fly side was also flipped, creating an alternating pattern, like the French regimental flags. The addition of the coat of arms, which consists of a bible opened to John 8:31–32 above a cross and the motto Dios, Patria, Libertad (God, Fatherland, Liberty), further reflected the Christian ideals of Duarte.

== Use ==
The use of the Dominican flag is essentially regulated by Law 210-19, which regulates the use of the national symbols of the Dominican Republic. This law stipulates the following:

- The front side of the flag is the one in which the blue upper quarter is on the observer's left.
- The flag will never touch the ground.
- The flag will be flown every weekday on all official state buildings and offices, from sunrise to sunset.
- The flag must not be displayed in poor condition (not torn, damaged, or dirty).
- It is the duty of every Dominican to display the flag on national holidays (February 27 or August 16, for example).
- When the flag is flown next to another, it must always be on the right (left of the observer looking at it from the front).
- When the flag is flown vertically, the blue quarter in the upper corner, which is attached to the thick edge of the halyard, should be on the observer's left.
- When the flag is placed horizontally on a wall, the flag shall be hung so that the upper blue quarter, which is attached to the right edge of the halyard, is to the observer's left.

The white space's width is equal to half the width of a blue or red area.

Folding the flag

Dominican flag on a coffin. When the Dominican flag is placed on a coffin, the blue quarter attached to the edge of the halyard should be placed over the deceased's left arm.

When the flag is flown next to another, it must always be on the right (left of the observer looking at it from the front).Examples: (1) On a speaker's podium. (2) On a public building.

When the flag is displayed horizontally on a wall, balcony, etc., it shall be hung so that the upper blue quarter, (upper hoist) attached to the right edge of the halyard, is to the observer's left. When the flag is displayed vertically, the upper blue quarter, attached to the thick edge of the halyard, shall be to the observer's left.

Hoisting and Lowering of the Flag on Occasion of Mourning :(1) When the flag is to be flown at half-mast, it shall first be raised to the top and then lowered to the half-mast position. (2) When it is to be lowered, it shall be hoisted to the top and then lowered.

=== Specific occasions ===
On days officially declared as national mourning, the flag is first raised to the top of the flagpole and then lowered to half-mast. The coffins of members of the Armed Forces and high-ranking public officials are covered with the National Flag. The celebration of Flag Day was first established in Official Gazette No. 5231 of May 1938, during the rule of Rafael Trujillo. It declared October 24 as Flag Day, Generalissimo Trujillo's birthday. Once the Trujillo Era ended, Law 6085 of October 22, 1962 (Official Gazette 8707 of November 3, 1962) established February 27, the Dominican Independence Day, as the national flag day.

== In music and poetry ==
The poet Gastón Fernando Deligne composed a poem in honor of the Dominican flag called "Arriba el Pabellón" (Up with the Flag). Note that stanzas 7, 8, and 9 discuss the meaning of the flag's colors:

Spanish
El rojo de su gloriosa
decisión dice al oído,
Soy - dice - el laurel teñido
con su sangre generosa.

Es el azul de su anhelo
progresitas clara enseña
color con que el alma sueña
cuando sueña con el cielo.

El blanco póstumo amor
a sus entrañas se aferra
dar por corona a la guerra
el olivo al redentor.

English
The red of his glorious
decision whispers in your ear,
I am, it says, the laurel dyed
with his generous blood.

It is the blue of your longing
progressive, a clear banner of
colour with which the soul dreams
when it dreams of the sky.

The white posthumous love
clings to its depths,
giving as a crown to war
the olive branch to the redeemer.

There is also a national anthem to the flag for schools.

== Chronology ==
Flag	Period	Use	Description
	1492–1795	Flag of the Captaincy General of Santo Domingo	The Cross of Burgundy was used by Spanish military units in the 15th to 18th centuries and is often used to represent the Spanish Empire.
	1809–1821	Flag of the Captaincy General of Santo Domingo	The French occupation of Santo Domingo threatened to distort the Dominicans' Spanish identity and customs. The Spanish rebelled against the French at the Battle of Palo Hincado, expelling them. Thus, Santo Domingo returned to Spain until 1821.
	1821–1822	Flag of the Republic of Spanish Haiti	During the period of "España Boba", (meek Spain), Spain neglected Santo Domingo to attend to the territories of continental America that were seeking independence. Dissatisfied, the Creoles, led by José Núñez de Cáceres, separated from Spain and created the Republic of Spanish Haiti, later annexing it to Gran Colombia . This state existed until 1822. This period is known as the "Independencia efímera" (ephemeral independence).
	1822–1844	Flag of Haiti	It was a historical period that lasted 22 years, in which Haiti governed the eastern part of the island, imposing itself on the new State of Spanish Haiti, which was divided into two departments: located in the northern portion, the Cibao and in the southern portion, the Ozama.
	1844–1849	Flag of La Trinitaria
	1849–1861	Flag of the Dominican Republic
	1861–1865	Flag of the Captaincy General of Santo Domingo	In 1861, after 17 years of independence, General Pedro Santana asked Queen Isabella II of Spain to regain control of the Dominican Republic, and Spain made the territory a province, thus implementing the union.
	1865–1916	Flag of the Dominican Republic
	1916–1924	Flag of the United States (1912–1948)	Following the Dominican Restoration War, instigated by the United States ' interest in controlling Spanish America, the Dominican Republic experienced several years of internal civil wars, political instability, and irresponsible borrowing, first with European banks and then with American banks. Each Dominican government that came to power borrowed money and was overthrown, continuing this cycle over and over again. The Americans, fearing that the debt would not be paid, militarily invaded the Dominican Republic in 1916 and, once occupied, implemented several economic reforms.
	1924–present	Flag of the Dominican Republic

== Presidential Standard ==
Presidential ensign at Sea

== Other flags ==
Flag of Rafael Trujillo

Army flag

Naval ensign

Naval jack

Air force ensign

Police flag

Flag of Judicial Power

== Historical national flags ==
Flag of the Captaincy General of Santo Domingo

Flag of the Republic of Spanish Haiti

Flag of the First Dominican Republic

== Gallery ==
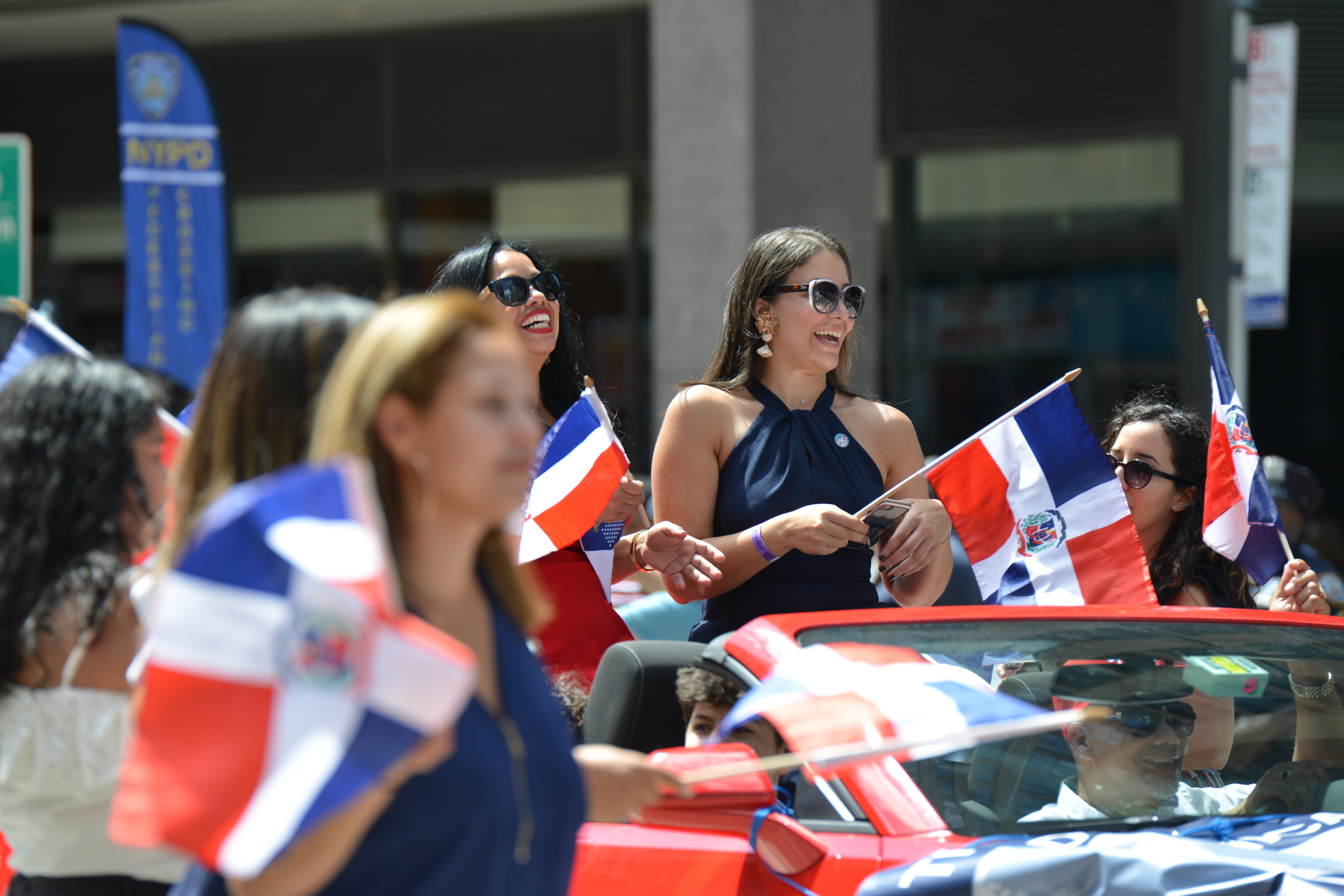
Dominicans in New York Dominican parade holding flags

Dominican flags at the National Pantheon of the Dominican Republic

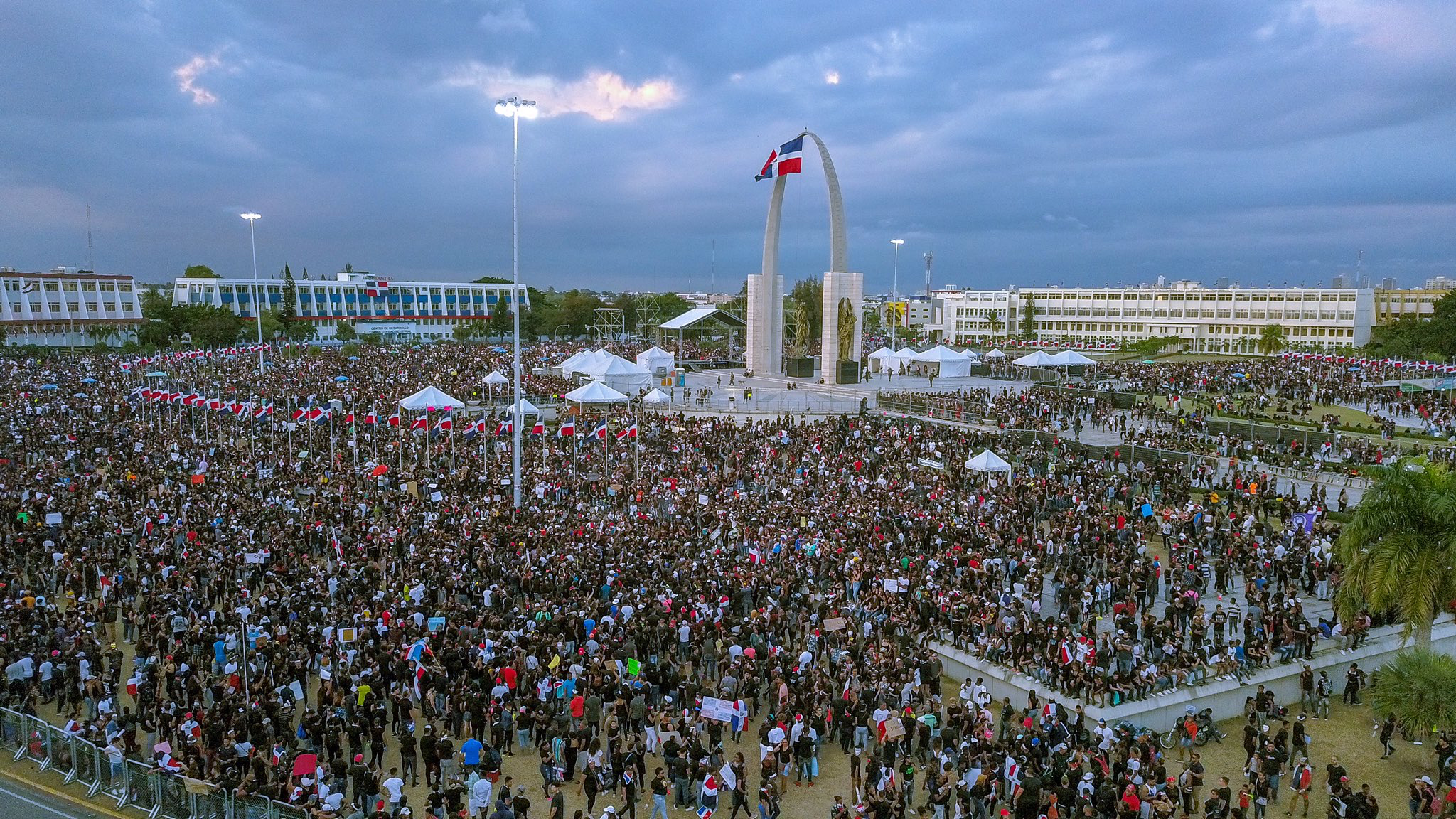
Dominican protesting during the 2020 Dominican Republic protests at the Flag Square of Santo Domingo

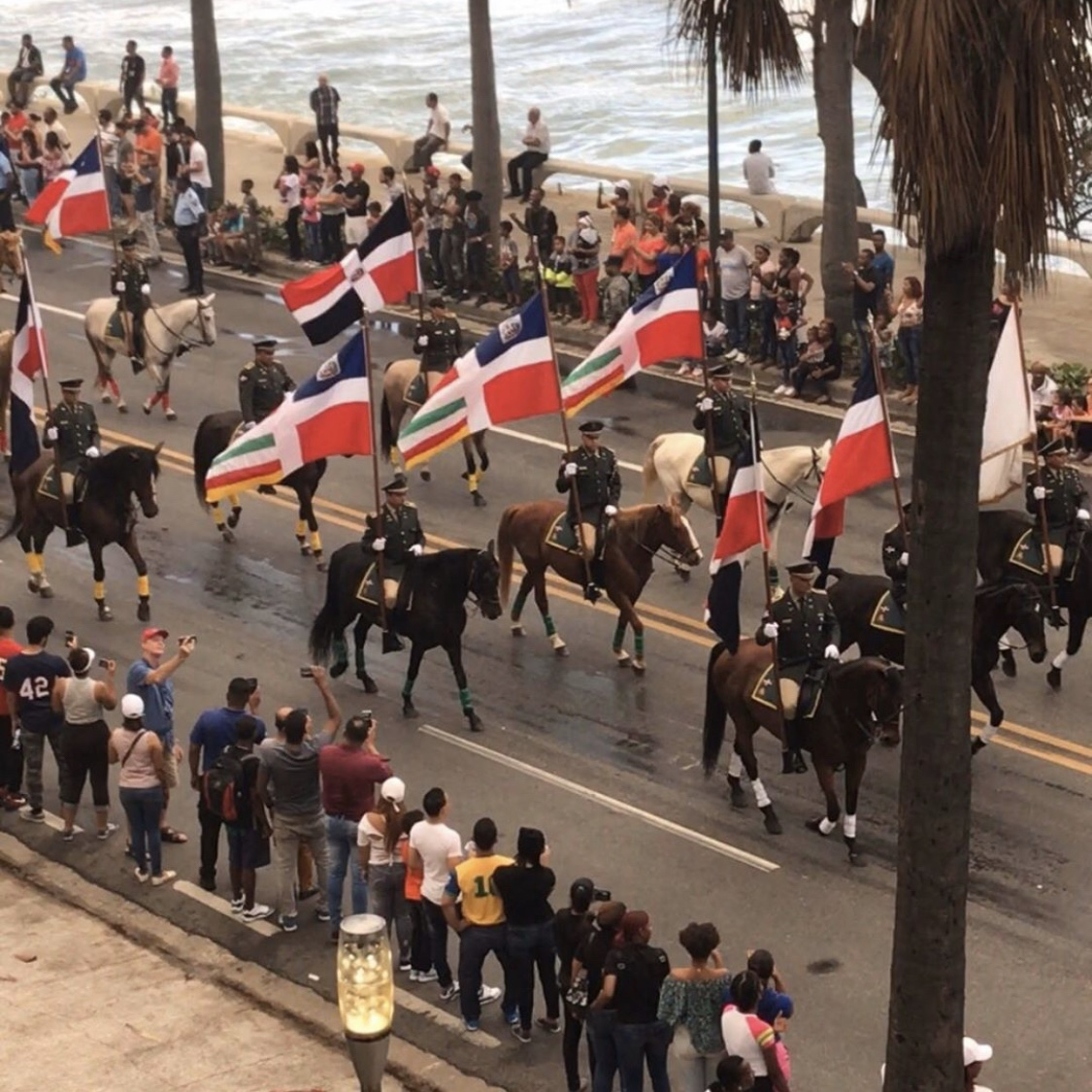
Dominican Army marching on Dominican Independence Day with flags

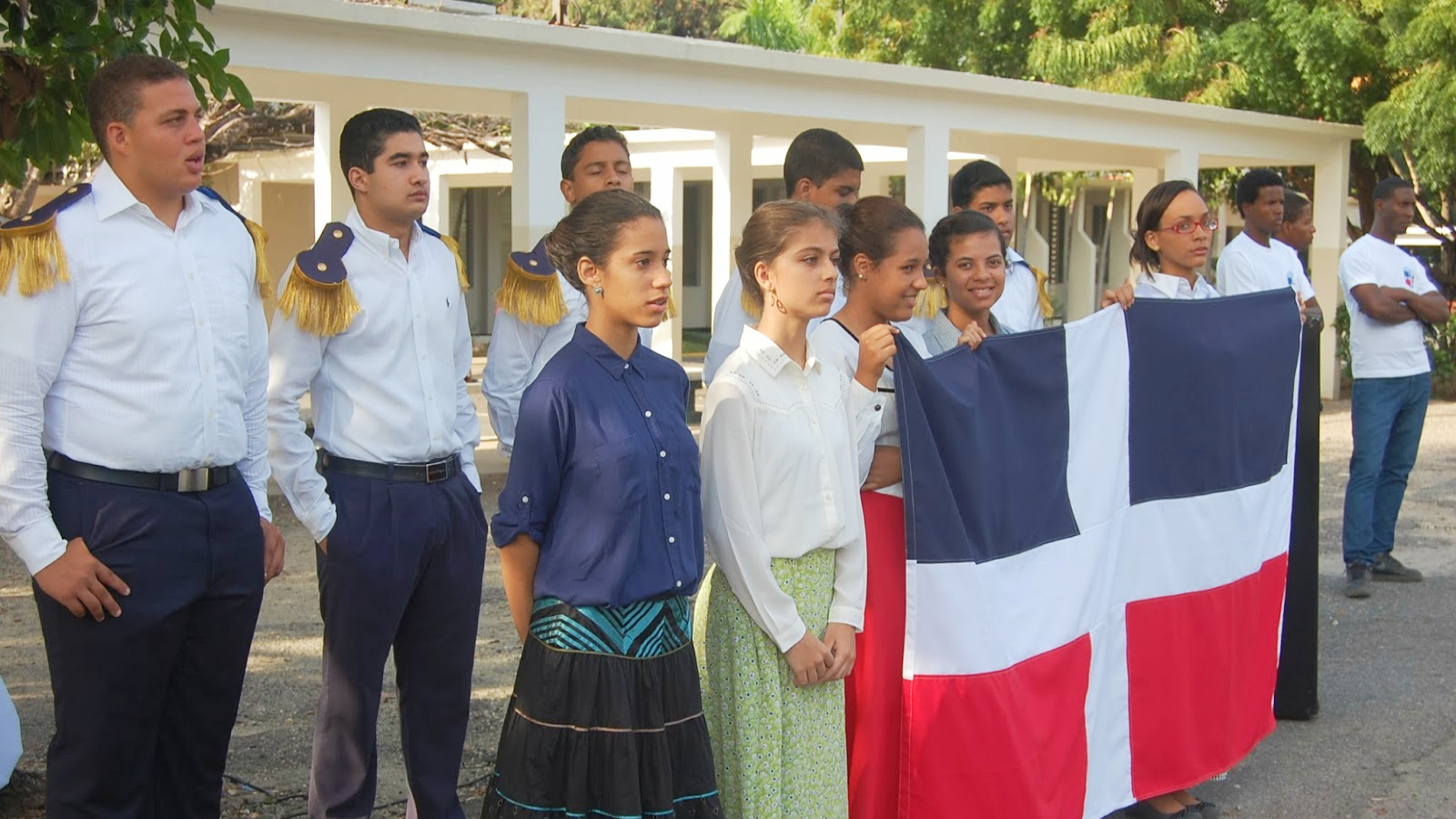
Students with the 1844 Dominican Flag

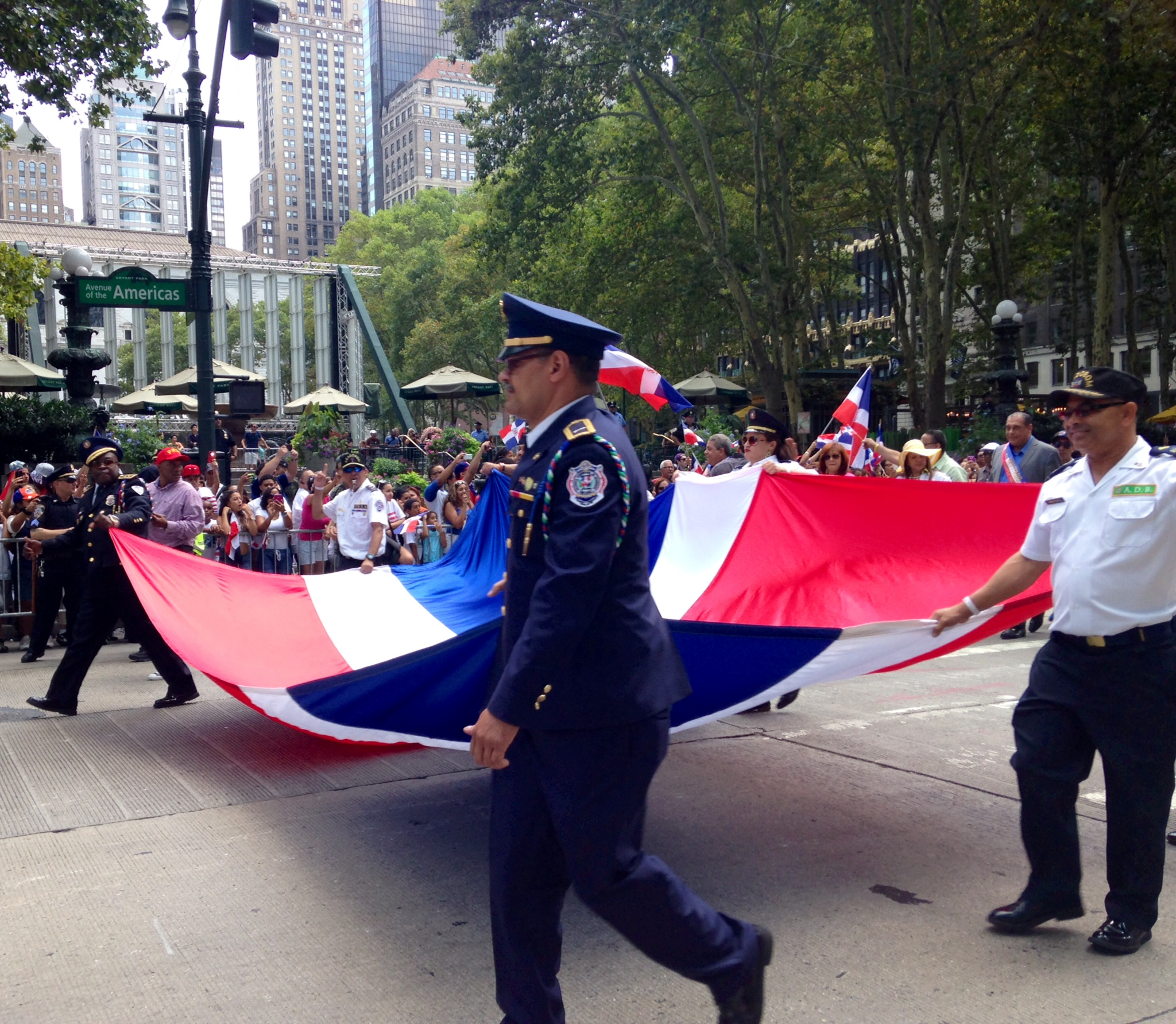
New York City Police Department holding the Dominican flag at the Dominican Day Parade

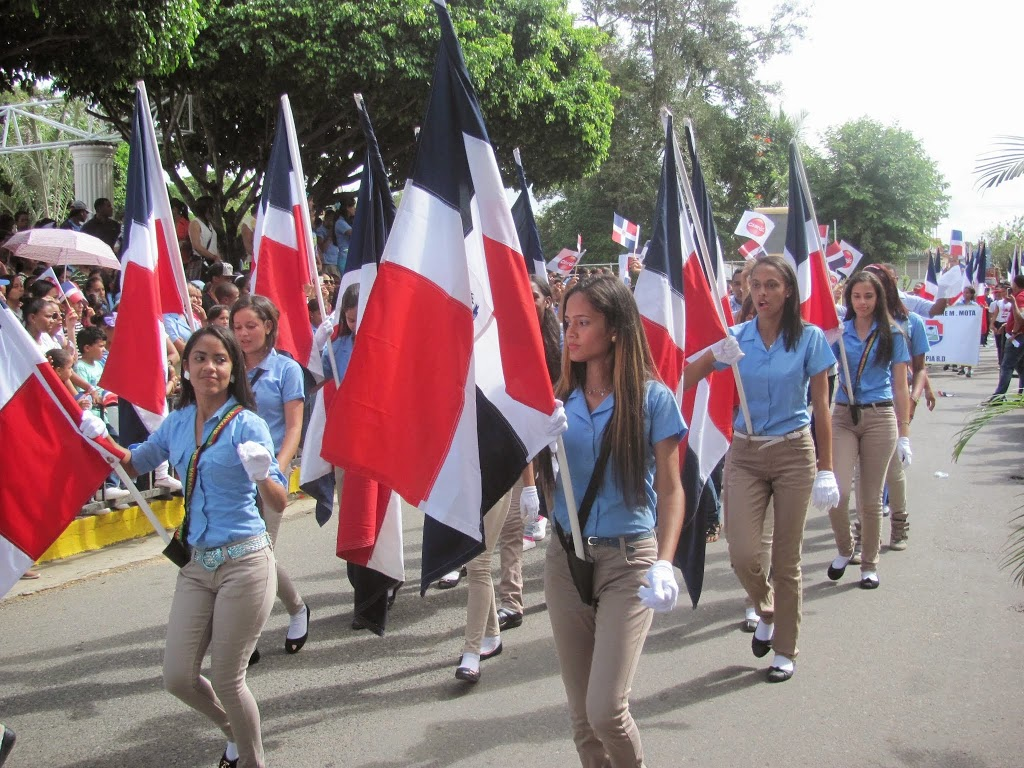
Dominicans with flag in Hermanas Mirabal province

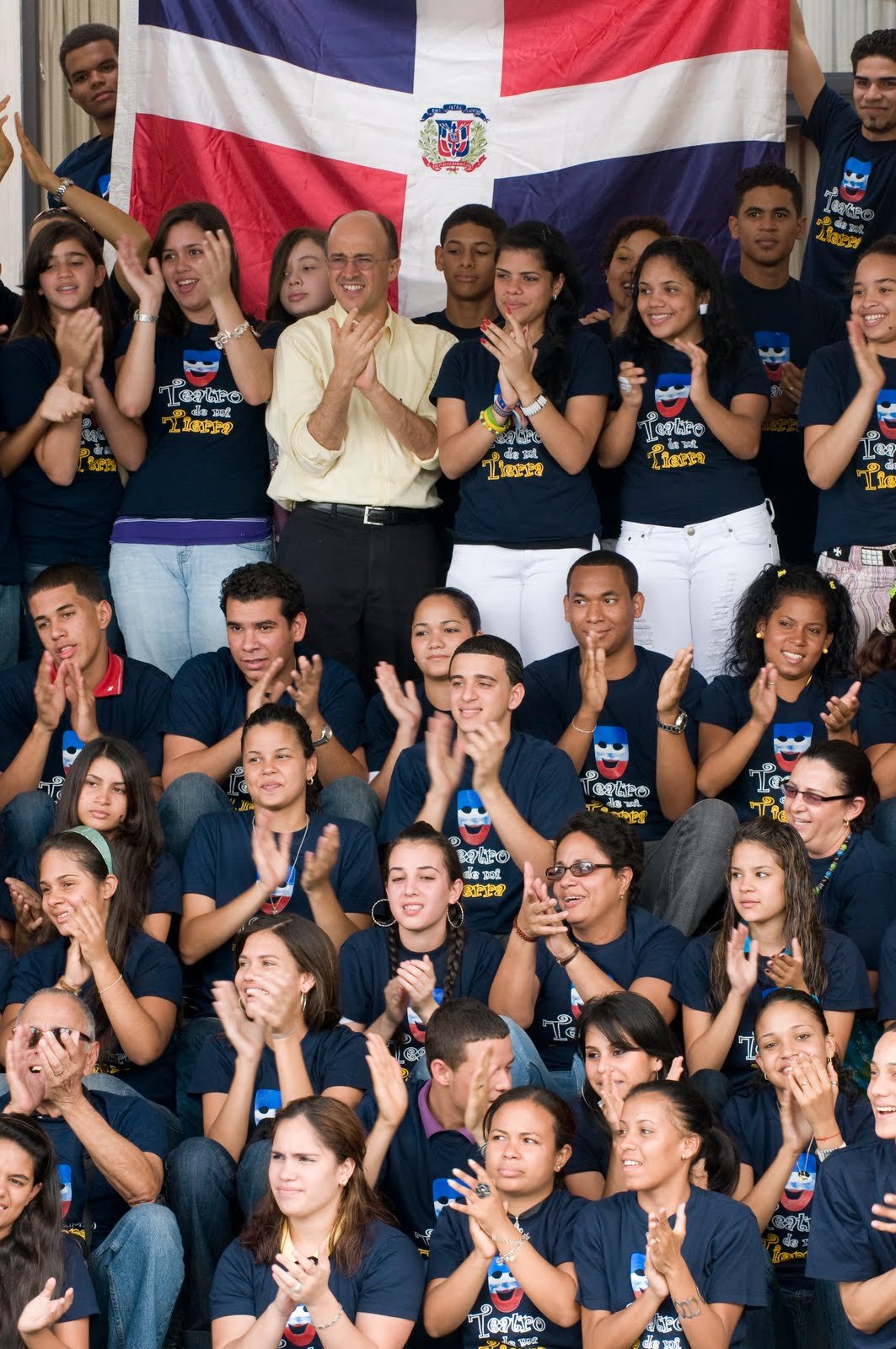
Dominicans with Dominican Republic flag

== See also ==
- List of Dominican Republic flags
