= Dominican Republic Olympic Committee =

National Olympic Committee

- Country: Dominican Republic
- Code: DOM
- Created: 1946
- Recognized: 1954
- Continental Association: PASO
- Headquarters: 18°28′11″N 69°55′07″W; Avenida Pedro Henríquez Ureña 107, La Esperilla, Santo Domingo, Distrito Nacional, 10107, Dominican Republic
- President: Garibaldy Bautista
- Secretary General: Luis Chanlatte
- Website: colimdo.org (in Spanish)

The Dominican Republic Olympic Committee (Spanish: Comité Olímpico Dominicano, COLIMDO) is the organization that represents Dominican athletes in the International Olympic Committee (IOC) and the Pan American Games.

The Dominican Republic Olympic Committee is headquartered in Santo Domingo, Dominican Republic. Garibaldy Bautista currently directs the organization.

== See also ==
- Dominican Republic at the Olympics
