= Baseball at the 2020 Summer Olympics – Team squads =

Team rosters for the baseball competition at the 2020 Summer Olympics

Below are the team rosters for the baseball competition at the 2020 Summer Olympics.

== Rosters ==
=== Dominican Republic ===
The Dominican Baseball Federation announced their final roster on July 8, 2021. Gabriel Arias replaced Diego Goris on the Olympic team roster after Goris tested positive for cannabis. Ramón Rosso replaced Gerson Bautista on the roster when Bautista had to enter COVID-19 health and safety protocols.

Player	No.	Pos.	Date of birth (age)	Team	League	Birthplace
C. C. Mercedes	15	P	March 8, 1994 (age 27)	(Japan) Yomiuri Giants	(Japan) Nippon Professional Baseball	(Dominican Republic) La Romana
Ramón Rosso	23	P	June 9, 1996 (age 25)	(United States) Philadelphia Phillies (minors)	(United States) Minor League Baseball	(Dominican Republic) Santo Domingo
Junior García	28	P	October 1, 1995 (age 25)	(United States) Arizona Diamondbacks (minors)	(United States) Minor League Baseball	(Dominican Republic) Jima Abajo
Luis Castillo	31	P	March 10, 1995 (age 26)	(United States) Arizona Diamondbacks (minors)	(United States) Minor League Baseball	(Dominican Republic) Fantino
Jairo Asencio	33	P	May 30, 1983 (age 38)	Free agent		(Dominican Republic) Sabana Grande de Palenque
Jhan Mariñez	37	P	August 12, 1988 (age 33)	Free agent		(Dominican Republic) Santo Domingo
Ángel Sánchez	38	P	November 28, 1989 (age 31)	(Japan) Yomiuri Giants	(Japan) Nippon Professional Baseball	(Dominican Republic) Salcedo
Darío Álvarez	39	P	January 17, 1989 (age 32)	(Mexico) Algodoneros de Unión Laguna	(Mexico) Mexican League	(Dominican Republic) Santiago
Denyi Reyes	41	P	November 2, 1996 (age 24)	(United States) Boston Red Sox (minors)	(United States) Minor League Baseball	(Dominican Republic) San Cristóbal
Raúl Valdés	56	P	November 27, 1977 (age 43)	Free agent		(Cuba) Havana
Jumbo Díaz	70	P	February 27, 1984 (age 37)	(Mexico) Diablos Rojos del México	(Mexico) Mexican League	(Dominican Republic) La Romana
Gabriel Arias	79	P	December 6, 1989 (age 31)	(Mexico) Pericos de Puebla	(Mexico) Mexican League	(Dominican Republic) Licey al Medio
Charlie Valerio	7	C	November 7, 1990 (age 30)	(United States) Sioux Falls Canaries	(United States) American Association	(Dominican Republic) Santiago
Roldani Baldwin	16	C	March 16, 1996 (age 25)	(United States) Boston Red Sox (minors)	(United States) Minor League Baseball	(Dominican Republic) Puerto Plata
Gustavo Núñez	2	IF	February 8, 1988 (age 33)	Free agent		(Dominican Republic) San Pedro de Macorís
Erick Mejia	6	IF	November 9, 1994 (age 26)	(United States) Kansas City Royals (minors)	(United States) Minor League Baseball	(Dominican Republic) Villa Mella
Jeison Guzmán	10	IF	October 8, 1998 (age 22)	(United States) Kansas City Royals (minors)	(United States) Minor League Baseball	(Dominican Republic) Santo Domingo
José Bautista	19	IF	October 19, 1980 (age 40)	Free agent		(Dominican Republic) Santo Domingo
Yefri Pérez	3	OF	February 24, 1991 (age 30)	Free agent		(Dominican Republic) Baní
Melky Cabrera	14	OF	August 11, 1984 (age 37)	Free agent		(Dominican Republic) Santo Domingo
Julio Rodríguez	18	OF	December 29, 2000 (age 20)	(United States) Seattle Mariners (minors)	(United States) Minor League Baseball	(Dominican Republic) Loma de Cabrera
Johan Mieses	36	OF	July 13, 1995 (age 26)	(United States) Boston Red Sox (minors)	(United States) Minor League Baseball	(Dominican Republic) Santo Domingo
Emilio Bonifácio	64	OF	April 23, 1985 (age 36)	Free agent		(Dominican Republic) Santo Domingo

=== Israel ===
The Israel Association of Baseball announced the team's final roster on July 5, 2021. The team is composed mostly of American Jews with only four Israeli-born players.

Player	No.	Pos.	Date of birth (age)	Team	League	Birthplace
D. J. Sharabi	10	P	March 7, 1992 (age 29)	(United States) Sioux Falls Canaries	(United States) American Association	(United States) San Mateo, California
Shlomo Lipetz	12	P	February 11, 1979 (age 42)	Free agent		(Israel) Tel Aviv
Joey Wagman	14	P	July 25, 1991 (age 30)	(Czech Republic) Tempo Praha	(Czech Republic) Czech Baseball Extraliga	(United States) Walnut Creek, California
Jake Fishman	17	P	February 8, 1995 (age 26)	(United States) Miami Marlins (minors)	(United States) Minor League Baseball	(United States) Newton, Massachusetts
Jonathan de Marte	21	P	April 29, 1993 (age 28)	Free agent		(United States) Yorktown Heights, New York
Ben Wanger	23	P	April 7, 1997 (age 24)	(United States) Miami Hurricanes	(United States) NCAA Division 1	(United States) Newton, Massachusetts
Jon Moscot	27	P	August 15, 1991 (age 29)	Free agent		(United States) Santa Monica, California
Josh Zeid	28	P	March 24, 1987 (age 34)	Free agent		(United States) New Haven, Connecticut
Alon Leichman	29	P	May 29, 1989 (age 32)	Free agent		(Israel) Kibbutz Gezer
Jeremy Bleich	30	P	June 18, 1987 (age 34)	Free agent		(United States) Metairie, Louisiana
Zack Weiss	44	P	June 16, 1992 (age 29)	(United States) Seattle Mariners (minors)	(United States) Minor League Baseball	(United States) Irvine, California
Alex Katz	47	P	October 12, 1994 (age 26)	(United States) Chicago Cubs (minors)	(United States) Minor League Baseball	(United States) Manhasset, New York
Tal Erel	7	C	June 16, 1996 (age 25)	(United States) Lynn Fighting Knights	(United States) NCAA Division 2	(Israel) Ramat Gan
Nick Rickles	9	C	February 2, 1990 (age 30)	Free agent		(United States) Fort Lauderdale, Florida
Ryan Lavarnway	36	C	August 7, 1987 (age 33)	(United States) Cleveland Indians (minors)	(United States) Minor League Baseball	(United States) Burbank, California
Ian Kinsler	3	IF	June 22, 1982 (age 39)	(United States) Long Island Ducks	(United States) American Association	(United States) Tucson, Arizona
Zach Penprase	6	IF	February 16, 1985 (age 36)	(United States) New York Boulders	(United States) Frontier League	(United States) Moorpark, California
Scott Burcham	8	IF	June 17, 1993 (age 28)	(United States) Colorado Rockies (minors)	(United States) Minor League Baseball	(United States) Phoenix, Arizona
Ty Kelly	11	IF	July 20, 1988 (age 33)	(United States) Seattle Mariners (minors)	(United States) Minor League Baseball	(United States) Dallas, Texas
Danny Valencia	19	IF	September 19, 1984 (age 36)	(United States) Long Island Ducks	(United States) American Association	(United States) Miami, Florida
Mitch Glasser	22	IF	October 15, 1989 (age 31)	(United States) Sioux Falls Canaries	(United States) American Association	(United States) Chicago, Illinois
Blake Gailen	2	OF	March 27, 1985 (age 36)	(United States) Lancaster Barnstormers	(United States) Atlantic League	(United States) Verdugo Hills, California
Robb Paller	4	OF	May 21, 1993 (age 28)	(United States) Colorado Springs Snow Sox	(United States) Pecos League	(United States) Brooklyn, New York
Assaf Lowengart	24	OF	March 1, 1998 (age 23)	(United States) Mansfield Mountaineers	(United States) NCAA Division 2	(Israel) Timorim

=== Japan ===
The final roster was announced on 16 June 2021.

Player	No.	Pos.	Birth date (age)	Team	League	Place of birth
Kōyō Aoyagi	12	P	December 11, 1993 (age 32)	(Japan) Hanshin Tigers	(Japan) Nippon Professional Baseball	(Japan) Yokohama, Kanagawa
Suguru Iwazaki	13	P	June 19, 1991 (age 34)	(Japan) Hanshin Tigers	(Japan) Nippon Professional Baseball	(Japan) Shimizu, Shizuoka
Masato Morishita	15	P	August 25, 1997 (age 28)	(Japan) Hiroshima Toyo Carp	(Japan) Nippon Professional Baseball	(Japan) Ōita, Ōita
Hiromi Itoh	16	P	August 31, 1997 (age 28)	(Japan) Hokkaido Nippon-Ham Fighters	(Japan) Nippon Professional Baseball	(Japan) Kayabe, Hokkaido
Yoshinobu Yamamoto	17	P	August 17, 1998 (age 27)	(Japan) Orix Buffaloes	(Japan) Nippon Professional Baseball	(Japan) Bizen, Okayama
Masahiro Tanaka	18	P	November 1, 1988 (age 37)	(Japan) Tohoku Rakuten Golden Eagles	(Japan) Nippon Professional Baseball	(Japan) Itami, Hyōgo
Yasuaki Yamasaki	19	P	October 2, 1992 (age 33)	(Japan) Yokohama DeNA BayStars	(Japan) Nippon Professional Baseball	(Japan) Arakawa, Tokyo
Ryoji Kuribayashi	20	P	July 9, 1996 (age 29)	(Japan) Hiroshima Toyo Carp	(Japan) Nippon Professional Baseball	(Japan) Aisai, Aichi
Yūdai Ōno	22	P	September 26, 1988 (age 37)	(Japan) Chunichi Dragons	(Japan) Nippon Professional Baseball	(Japan) Fushimi-ku, Kyoto
Kodai Senga	41	P	January 30, 1993 (age 33)	(Japan) Fukuoka SoftBank Hawks	(Japan) Nippon Professional Baseball	(Japan) Gamagōri, Aichi
Kaima Taira	61	P	November 15, 1999 (age 26)	(Japan) Saitama Seibu Lions	(Japan) Nippon Professional Baseball	(Japan) Ishigaki, Okinawa
Ryutaro Umeno	7	C	June 17, 1991 (age 34)	(Japan) Hanshin Tigers	(Japan) Nippon Professional Baseball	(Japan) Fukuoka
Takuya Kai	10	C	November 5, 1992 (age 33)	(Japan) Fukuoka SoftBank Hawks	(Japan) Nippon Professional Baseball	(Japan) Ōita, Ōita
Tetsuto Yamada	1	IF	July 16, 1992 (age 33)	(Japan) Tokyo Yakult Swallows	(Japan) Nippon Professional Baseball	(Japan) Toyooka, Hyōgo
Sōsuke Genda	2	IF	February 16, 1993 (age 33)	(Japan) Saitama Seibu Lions	(Japan) Nippon Professional Baseball	(Japan) Ōita, Ōita
Hideto Asamura	3	IF	November 12, 1990 (age 35)	(Japan) Tohoku Rakuten Golden Eagles	(Japan) Nippon Professional Baseball	(Japan) Higashiyodogawa-ku, Osaka
Ryosuke Kikuchi	4	IF	March 11, 1990 (age 35)	(Japan) Hiroshima Toyo Carp	(Japan) Nippon Professional Baseball	(Japan) Higashiyamato, Tokyo
Hayato Sakamoto	6	IF	December 14, 1988 (age 37)	(Japan) Yomiuri Giants	(Japan) Nippon Professional Baseball	(Japan) Itami, Hyōgo
Munetaka Murakami	55	IF	February 2, 2000 (age 26)	(Japan) Tokyo Yakult Swallows	(Japan) Nippon Professional Baseball	(Japan) Kumamoto, Kumamoto
Kensuke Kondoh	8	OF	August 9, 1993 (age 32)	(Japan) Hokkaido Nippon-Ham Fighters	(Japan) Nippon Professional Baseball	(Japan) Midori-ku, Chiba
Yuki Yanagita	9	OF	October 9, 1988 (age 37)	(Japan) Fukuoka SoftBank Hawks	(Japan) Nippon Professional Baseball	(Japan) Hiroshima, Hiroshima
Ryoya Kurihara	31	OF	July 4, 1996 (age 29)	(Japan) Fukuoka SoftBank Hawks	(Japan) Nippon Professional Baseball	(Japan) Fukui, Fukui
Masataka Yoshida	34	OF	July 15, 1993 (age 32)	(Japan) Orix Buffaloes	(Japan) Nippon Professional Baseball	(Japan) Fukui, Fukui
Seiya Suzuki	51	OF	August 18, 1994 (age 31)	(Japan) Hiroshima Toyo Carp	(Japan) Nippon Professional Baseball	(Japan) Arakawa, Tokyo

=== Mexico ===
On July 8, 2021, Mexico's final roster was announced. Héctor Velázquez and Sammy Solís were removed from the roster after testing positive for COVID-19. They were replaced by Édgar Arredondo and Fabián Anguamea. Ryan Goins replaced Brandon Laird, who did not receive permission from his professional team to participate.

Player	No.	Pos.	Birth date (age)	Team	League	Place of birth
Édgar Arredondo	17	P	May 16, 1997 (age 28)	(United States) Arizona Diamondbacks (minors)	(United States) Minor League Baseball	(Mexico) Culiacán, Sinaloa
Manny Bañuelos	20	P	March 13, 1991 (age 34)	(Taiwan) Fubon Guardians	(Taiwan) Chinese Professional Baseball League	(Mexico) Gómez Palacio, Durango
Óliver Pérez	29	P	August 15, 1981 (age 44)	(Mexico) Toros de Tijuana	(Mexico) Mexican League	(Mexico) Culiacán, Sinaloa
Juan Pablo Oramas	35	P	May 11, 1990 (age 35)	(Mexico) Olmecas de Tabasco	(Mexico) Mexican League	(Mexico) Villahermosa, Tabasco
Teddy Stankiewicz	36	P	November 25, 1993 (age 32)	(Taiwan) Uni-President Lions	(Taiwan) Chinese Professional Baseball League	(United States) Keller, Texas
Carlos Bustamante	46	P	September 25, 1994 (age 31)	(Mexico) Acereros de Monclova	(Mexico) Mexican League	(Mexico) Navojoa, Sonora
Sasagi Sánchez	48	P	September 25, 1994 (age 31)	(Mexico) Diablos Rojos del México	(Mexico) Mexican League	(Mexico) Mazatlán, Sinaloa
César Vargas	49	P	December 30, 1991 (age 34)	(Mexico) Sultanes de Monterrey	(Mexico) Mexican League	(Mexico) Puebla
Manny Barreda	50	P	October 8, 1988 (age 37)	(United States) Baltimore Orioles (minors)	(United States) Minor League Baseball	(United States) Prescott, Arizona
Daniel Duarte	53	P	December 4, 1996 (age 29)	(United States) Cincinnati Reds (minors)	(United States) Minor League Baseball	(Mexico) Huatabampo, Sonora
Fernando Salas	59	P	May 30, 1985 (age 40)	(Mexico) Olmecas de Tabasco	(Mexico) Mexican League	(Mexico) Huatabampo, Sonora
Fabián Anguamea	66	P	December 21, 1993 (age 32)	(Mexico) Tigres de Quintana Roo	(Mexico) Mexican League	(Mexico) Ciudad Obregón, Sonora
Alexis Wilson	13	C	August 13, 1996 (age 29)	(Mexico) Tigres de Quintana Roo	(Mexico) Mexican League	(Mexico) Los Mochis, Sinaloa
Alí Solís	44	C	September 29, 1987 (age 38)	(Mexico) Sultanes de Monterrey	(Mexico) Mexican League	(Mexico) Mexicali, Baja California
Danny Espinosa	18	IF	April 25, 1987 (age 38)	(Mexico) Acereros de Monclova	(Mexico) Mexican League	(United States) Santa Ana, California
Ramiro Peña	19	IF	July 18, 1985 (age 40)	(Mexico) Sultanes de Monterrey	(Mexico) Mexican League	(Mexico) Monterrey, Nuevo León
Adrián González	23	IF	May 8, 1982 (age 43)	(Mexico) Mariachis de Guadalajara	(Mexico) Mexican League	(United States) San Diego, California
Efrén Navarro	24	IF	May 14, 1986 (age 39)	(Mexico) Toros de Tijuana	(Mexico) Mexican League	(United States) Lynwood, California
Ryan Goins	54	IF	February 13, 1988 (age 38)	(United States) Atlanta Braves (minors)	(United States) Minor League Baseball	(United States) Temple, Texas
Isaac Rodríguez	74	IF	March 3, 1991 (age 35)	(Mexico) Toros de Tijuana	(Mexico) Mexican League	(Mexico) Hermosillo, Sonora
Sebastián Elizalde	5	OF	November 20, 1991 (age 34)	(Mexico) Sultanes de Monterrey	(Mexico) Mexican League	(Mexico) Guaymas, Sonora
Jonathan Jones	27	OF	August 2, 1989 (age 36)	(Mexico) Leones de Yucatán	(Mexico) Mexican League	(United States) Vacaville, California
Joey Meneses	32	OF	May 6, 1992 (age 33)	(United States) Boston Red Sox (minors)	(United States) Minor League Baseball	(Mexico) Culiacán, Sinaloa
José Cardona	33	OF	March 16, 1994 (age 31)	(Mexico) Sultanes de Monterrey	(Mexico) Mexican League	(Mexico) San Nicolás de los Garza, Nuevo León

=== South Korea ===
The Korea Baseball Organization announced the team's final roster on June 15, 2021.

Player	No.	Pos.	Date of birth (age)	Team	League	Birthplace
Ko Young-pyo	1	P	September 16, 1991 (age 29)	(South Korea) KT Wiz	(South Korea) KBO League	(South Korea) Naju
Cho Sang-woo	11	P	September 4, 1994 (age 26)	(South Korea) Kiwoom Heroes	(South Korea) KBO League	(South Korea) Uijeongbu
Kim Jin-uk	15	P	July 5, 2002 (age 19)	(South Korea) Lotte Giants	(South Korea) KBO League	(South Korea) Pyeongtaek
Won Tae-in	18	P	April 6, 2000 (age 21)	(South Korea) Samsung Lions	(South Korea) KBO League	(South Korea) Daegu
Woo-suk Go	19	P	August 6, 1998 (age 22)	(South Korea) LG Twins	(South Korea) KBO League	(South Korea) Incheon
Seung-hwan Oh	21	P	July 15, 1982 (age 39)	(South Korea) Samsung Lions	(South Korea) KBO League	(South Korea) Jeongeup
Cha Woo-chan	23	P	May 31, 1987 (age 34)	(South Korea) LG Twins	(South Korea) KBO League	(South Korea) Gunsan
Park Se-woong	32	P	November 30, 1995 (age 25)	(South Korea) Lotte Giants	(South Korea) KBO League	(South Korea)
Lee Eui-lee	48	P	June 16, 2002 (age 19)	(South Korea) Kia Tigers	(South Korea) KBO League	(South Korea) Gwangju
Kim Min-woo	55	P	July 25, 1995 (age 25)	(South Korea) Hanwha Eagles	(South Korea) KBO League	(South Korea) Changwon
Choi Won-joon	61	P	July 25, 1995 (age 25)	(South Korea) Doosan Bears	(South Korea) KBO League	(South Korea) Seoul
Yang Eui-ji	25	C	June 5, 1987 (age 34)	(South Korea) NC Dinos	(South Korea) KBO League	(South Korea) Gwangju
Kang Min-ho	47	C	August 18, 1985 (age 36)	(South Korea) Samsung Lions	(South Korea) KBO League	(South Korea)
Oh Ji-hwan	2	IF	July 2, 1990 (age 31)	(South Korea) LG Twins	(South Korea) KBO League	(South Korea) Gunsan
Hyeseong Kim	3	IF	January 27, 1999 (age 22)	(South Korea) Kiwoom Heroes	(South Korea) KBO League	(South Korea) Koyang
Jae-gyun Hwang	10	IF	July 28, 1987 (age 35)	(South Korea) KT Wiz	(South Korea) KBO League	(South Korea) Seoul
Hur Kyoung-min	13	IF	August 26, 1990 (age 30)	(South Korea) Doosan Bears	(South Korea) KBO League	(South Korea)
Oh Jae-il	44	IF	October 29, 1986 (age 34)	(South Korea) Samsung Lions	(South Korea) KBO League	(South Korea) Guri
Choi Joo-hwan	53	IF	February 28, 1988 (age 33)	(South Korea) SSG Landers	(South Korea) KBO League	(South Korea)
Park Hae-min	17	OF	February 24, 1990 (age 31)	(South Korea) Samsung Lions	(South Korea) KBO League	(South Korea) Seoul
Hyun-soo Kim	22	OF	January 12, 1988 (age 33)	(South Korea) LG Twins	(South Korea) KBO League	(South Korea) Seoul
Park Kun-woo	37	OF	September 8, 1990 (age 30)	(South Korea) Doosan Bears	(South Korea) KBO League	(South Korea)
Jung-hoo Lee	51	OF	August 20, 1998 (age 22)	(South Korea) Kiwoom Heroes	(South Korea) KBO League	(Japan) Nagoya

=== United States ===
USA Baseball announced the final roster on July 2, 2021.

Player	No.	Pos.	Date of birth (age)	Team	League	Birthplace
Nick Martinez	14	RHP	August 5, 1990 (aged 30)	(Japan) Fukuoka SoftBank Hawks	(Japan) Nippon Professional Baseball	(United States) Miami, FL
Scott Kazmir	15	LHP	January 24, 1984 (aged 37)	(United States) San Francisco Giants (minors)	(United States) Minor League Baseball	(United States) Houston, TX
Ryder Ryan	28	RHP	May 11, 1995 (aged 26)	(United States) Texas Rangers (minors)	(United States) Minor League Baseball	(United States) Huntersville, NC
David Robertson	30	RHP	April 9, 1985 (aged 36)	(United States) High Point Rockers	(United States) Atlantic League	(United States) Birmingham, AL
Anthony Gose	31	LHP	August 10, 1990 (aged 30)	(United States) Cleveland Guardians (minors)	(United States) Minor League Baseball	(United States) Paramount, CA
Brandon Dickson	32	RHP	November 3, 1984 (aged 36)	(United States) St. Louis Cardinals (minors)	(United States) Minor League Baseball	(United States) Montgomery, AL
Edwin Jackson	33	RHP	September 9, 1983 (aged 37)	(United States) High Point Rockers	(United States) Atlantic League	(Germany) Neu-Ulm
Shane Baz	35	RHP	June 17, 1999 (aged 22)	(United States) Tampa Bay Rays (minors)	(United States) Minor League Baseball	(United States) Cypress, TX
Scott McGough	39	RHP	October 31, 1989 (aged 31)	(Japan) Tokyo Yakult Swallows	(Japan) Nippon Professional Baseball	(United States) Pittsburgh, PA
Joe Ryan	40	RHP	June 5, 1996 (aged 25)	(United States) Minnesota Twins (minors)	(United States) Minor League Baseball	(United States) San Francisco, CA
Simeon Woods Richardson	44	RHP	September 27, 2000 (aged 20)	(Canada) Toronto Blue Jays (minors)	(United States) Minor League Baseball	(United States) Sugar Land, TX
Anthony Carter	48	RHP	April 4, 1986 (aged 35)	(Mexico) Saraperos de Saltillo	(Mexico) Mexican League	(United States) Decatur, GA
Mark Kolozsvary	8	C	September 4, 1995 (aged 25)	(United States) Cincinnati Reds (minors)	(United States) Minor League Baseball	(United States) Eustis, FL
Tim Federowicz	34	C	August 5, 1987 (aged 33)	(United States) Los Angeles Dodgers (minors)	(United States) Minor League Baseball	(United States) Erie, PA
Eddy Alvarez	2	IF	January 30, 1990 (aged 31)	(United States) Miami Marlins (minors)	(United States) Minor League Baseball	(United States) Miami, FL
Nick Allen	10	IF	October 8, 1998 (aged 22)	(United States) Oakland Athletics (minors)	(United States) Minor League Baseball	(United States) San Diego, CA
Jamie Westbrook	12	IF	June 18, 1995 (aged 26)	(United States) Milwaukee Brewers (minors)	(United States) Minor League Baseball	(United States) Springfield, MA
Todd Frazier	25	IF	February 12, 1986 (aged 35)	(United States) Sussex County Miners	(United States) Frontier League	(United States) Point Pleasant, NJ
Triston Casas	26	IF	January 15, 2000 (aged 21)	(United States) Boston Red Sox (minors)	(United States) Minor League Baseball	(United States) Pembroke Pines, FL
Eric Filia	5	OF	July 6, 1992 (aged 29)	(United States) Seattle Mariners (minors)	(United States) Minor League Baseball	(United States) Carlsbad, CA
Jack López	7	OF	December 16, 1992 (aged 28)	(United States) Boston Red Sox (minors)	(United States) Minor League Baseball	(Puerto Rico) Río Piedras
Patrick Kivlehan	16	OF	December 22, 1989 (aged 31)	(United States) San Diego Padres (minors)	(United States) Minor League Baseball	(United States) Nyack, NY
Tyler Austin	23	OF	September 6, 1991 (aged 29)	(Japan) Yokohama DeNA BayStars	(Japan) Nippon Professional Baseball	(United States) Conyers, GA
Bubba Starling	24	OF	August 3, 1992 (aged 28)	(United States) Kansas City Royals (minors)	(United States) Minor League Baseball	(United States) Gardner, KS

== Players by league ==
# of Players	Country	League
37	(United States)	Minor League Baseball
31	(Japan)	Nippon Professional Baseball
23	(South Korea)	KBO League
21	(Mexico)	Mexican League
5	(United States)	American Association
3	(United States)	Atlantic League
3	(United States)	NCAA College baseball
2	(Taiwan)	Chinese Professional Baseball League
2	(United States)	Frontier League
1	(Czech Republic)	Czech Baseball Extraliga
1	(United States)	Pecos League
