= Dominican Republic at the 2020 Summer Olympics =

- Flag of the Dominican Republic
- IOC code: DOM
- NOC: Dominican Republic Olympic Committee
- Website: www.colimdo.org (in Spanish)

in Tokyo, Japan 23 July 2021 – 8 August 2021
- Competitors: 64 in 11 sports
- Flag bearers (opening): Prisilla Rivera; Rodrigo Marte
- Flag bearer (closing): Prisilla Rivera
- Medals Ranked 68th: Gold 0 Silver 3 Bronze 2 Total 5

Summer Olympics appearances (overview)
- 1964; 1968; 1972; 1976; 1980; 1984; 1988; 1992; 1996; 2000; 2004; 2008; 2012; 2016; 2020; 2024

The Dominican Republic competed at the 2020 Summer Olympics in Tokyo. Originally scheduled to take place from 24 July to 9 August 2020, the Games were postponed to 23 July to 8 August 2021, because of the COVID-19 pandemic. It was the nation's fifteenth consecutive appearance at the Summer Olympics. The Dominican Republic left the Summer Olympics with 3 silver medals and 2 bronze medals with moderate success, but not able to secure a single gold medal in any of the events.

== Medalists ==
Medal	Name	Sport	Event	Date
Silver	Zacarías Bonnat	Weightlifting	Men's 81 kg	31 July
Silver	Lidio Andrés Feliz; Marileidy Paulino; Anabel Medina; Luguelín Santos; Alexander Ogando	Athletics	Mixed 4 × 400 metres relay	31 July
Silver	Marileidy Paulino	Athletics	Women's 400 metres	6 August
Bronze	Crismery Santana	Weightlifting	Women's 87 kg	2 August
Bronze	Dominican Republic national baseball team: Darío Álvarez; Gabriel Arias; Jairo Asencio; Luis Felipe Castillo; Jumbo Díaz; Junior García; Jhan Mariñez; Cristopher Mercedes; Denyi Reyes; Ramón Rosso; Ángel Sánchez; Raúl Valdés; Roldani Baldwin; Charlie Valerio; José Bautista; Juan Francisco; Jeison Guzmán; Erick Mejia; Gustavo Núñez; Emilio Bonifácio; Melky Cabrera; Johan Mieses; Yefri Pérez; Julio Rodríguez	Baseball	Men's tournament	7 August

== Competitors ==
The following is the list of number of competitors participating in the Games:

Sport	Men	Women	Total
Athletics	4	2	6
Baseball	24	—N/a	24
Boxing	5	2	7
Diving	1	0	1
Equestrian	1	1	2
Judo	1	0	1
Rowing	1	0	1
Swimming	1	1	2
Taekwondo	2	1	3
Volleyball	0	12	12
Weightlifting	2	3	5
Total	42	22	64

== Athletics ==
Athletes from the Dominican Republic achieved entry standards, either by qualifying time or by world ranking, in the following track and field events (up to a maximum of 3 athletes in each event):

Key

- Note–Ranks given for track events are within the athlete's heat only
- Q = Qualified for the next round
- q = Qualified for the next round as a fastest loser or, in field events, by position without achieving the qualifying target
- NR = National record
- N/A = Round not applicable for the event
- Bye = Athlete not required to compete in round

Track & road events

Athlete	Event	Heat		Semifinal		Final	
Athlete	Event	Result	Rank	Result	Rank	Result	Rank
Yancarlos Martínez	Men's 200 m	20.17 NR	2 Q	20.24	4	Did not advance	
Marileidy Paulino	Women's 400 m	50.06	1 Q	49.38 NR	1 Q	49.20 NR	2nd place, silver medalist(s)
Lidio Andrés Feliz; Marileidy Paulino; Anabel Medina; Luguelín Santos; Alexander Ogando	Mixed 4 × 400 m relay	3:12.74 NR	2 Q	—N/a		3:10.21 NR	2nd place, silver medalist(s)

Field events

Athlete	Event	Qualification		Final	
Athlete	Event	Distance	Position	Distance	Position
Ana José Tima	Women's triple jump	14.11	16	Did not advance	

== Baseball ==
The Dominican Republic national baseball team qualified for the Olympics by winning the gold medal at the 2021 Baseball Final Olympic Qualifying Tournament in Mexico and securing an outright berth, marking the country's Olympic debut in baseball.

Summary

Team	Event	Group stage			Round 1	Repechage 1	Round 2	Repechage 2	Semifinals	Final / BM	
Team	Event	Opposition Result	Opposition Result	Rank	Opposition Result	Opposition Result	Opposition Result	Opposition Result	Opposition Result	Opposition Result	Rank
Dominican Republic men's	Men's tournament	Japan; L 3–4	Mexico; W 6–4	2	South Korea; L 3–4	Israel; W 7–6	—N/a	United States; L 1–3	—N/a	South Korea; W 10–6	3rd place, bronze medalist(s)

Team roster

The Dominican Baseball Federation announced their final roster on July 8, 2021. Gabriel Arias replaced Diego Goris on the Olympic team roster after Goris tested positive for cannabis. Ramón Rosso replaced Gerson Bautista on the roster when Bautista had to enter COVID-19 health and safety protocols.

Player	No.	Pos.	Date of birth (age)	Team	League	Birthplace
C. C. Mercedes	15	P	March 8, 1994 (age 27)	(Japan) Yomiuri Giants	(Japan) Nippon Professional Baseball	(Dominican Republic) La Romana
Ramón Rosso	23	P	June 9, 1996 (age 25)	(United States) Philadelphia Phillies (minors)	(United States) Minor League Baseball	(Dominican Republic) Santo Domingo
Junior García	28	P	October 1, 1995 (age 25)	(United States) Arizona Diamondbacks (minors)	(United States) Minor League Baseball	(Dominican Republic) Jima Abajo
Luis Castillo	31	P	March 10, 1995 (age 26)	(United States) Arizona Diamondbacks (minors)	(United States) Minor League Baseball	(Dominican Republic) Fantino
Jairo Asencio	33	P	May 30, 1983 (age 38)	Free agent		(Dominican Republic) Sabana Grande de Palenque
Jhan Mariñez	37	P	August 12, 1988 (age 33)	Free agent		(Dominican Republic) Santo Domingo
Ángel Sánchez	38	P	November 28, 1989 (age 31)	(Japan) Yomiuri Giants	(Japan) Nippon Professional Baseball	(Dominican Republic) Salcedo
Darío Álvarez	39	P	January 17, 1989 (age 32)	(Mexico) Algodoneros de Unión Laguna	(Mexico) Mexican League	(Dominican Republic) Santiago
Denyi Reyes	41	P	November 2, 1996 (age 24)	(United States) Boston Red Sox (minors)	(United States) Minor League Baseball	(Dominican Republic) San Cristóbal
Raúl Valdés	56	P	November 27, 1977 (age 43)	Free agent		(Cuba) Havana
Jumbo Díaz	70	P	February 27, 1984 (age 37)	(Mexico) Diablos Rojos del México	(Mexico) Mexican League	(Dominican Republic) La Romana
Gabriel Arias	79	P	December 6, 1989 (age 31)	(Mexico) Pericos de Puebla	(Mexico) Mexican League	(Dominican Republic) Licey al Medio
Charlie Valerio	7	C	November 7, 1990 (age 30)	(United States) Sioux Falls Canaries	(United States) American Association	(Dominican Republic) Santiago
Roldani Baldwin	16	C	March 16, 1996 (age 25)	(United States) Boston Red Sox (minors)	(United States) Minor League Baseball	(Dominican Republic) Puerto Plata
Gustavo Núñez	2	IF	February 8, 1988 (age 33)	Free agent		(Dominican Republic) San Pedro de Macorís
Erick Mejia	6	IF	November 9, 1994 (age 26)	(United States) Kansas City Royals (minors)	(United States) Minor League Baseball	(Dominican Republic) Villa Mella
Jeison Guzmán	10	IF	October 8, 1998 (age 22)	(United States) Kansas City Royals (minors)	(United States) Minor League Baseball	(Dominican Republic) Santo Domingo
José Bautista	19	IF	October 19, 1980 (age 40)	Free agent		(Dominican Republic) Santo Domingo
Yefri Pérez	3	OF	February 24, 1991 (age 30)	Free agent		(Dominican Republic) Baní
Melky Cabrera	14	OF	August 11, 1984 (age 37)	Free agent		(Dominican Republic) Santo Domingo
Julio Rodríguez	18	OF	December 29, 2000 (age 20)	(United States) Seattle Mariners (minors)	(United States) Minor League Baseball	(Dominican Republic) Loma de Cabrera
Johan Mieses	36	OF	July 13, 1995 (age 26)	(United States) Boston Red Sox (minors)	(United States) Minor League Baseball	(Dominican Republic) Santo Domingo
Emilio Bonifácio	64	OF	April 23, 1985 (age 36)	Free agent		(Dominican Republic) Santo Domingo

Group play

Pos	Team	Pld	W	L	RF	RA	RD	PCT	GB	Qualification
1	Japan (H)	2	2	0	11	7	+4	1.000	—	Round 2
2	Dominican Republic	2	1	1	4	4	0	.500	1	Round 1 game #2
3	Mexico	2	0	2	4	8	−4	.000	2	Round 1 game #1

Source: TOCOG and WBSC
(H) Hosts

28 July 12:00 (JST) Fukushima Azuma Baseball Stadium
Team	1	2	3	4	5	6	7	8	9	R	H	E
Dominican Republic	0	0	0	0	0	0	2	0	1	3	8	0
Japan	0	0	0	0	0	0	1	0	3	4	9	0
WP: Ryoji Kuribayashi (1–0) LP: Jairo Asencio (0–1); Boxscore

30 July 12:00 Yokohama Stadium
Team	1	2	3	4	5	6	7	8	9	R	H	E
Mexico	0	0	0	0	0	0	0	0	0	0	4	0
Dominican Republic	0	0	0	0	1	0	0	0	X	1	6	0
WP: Ángel Sánchez (1–0) LP: Teddy Stankiewicz (0–1) Sv: Luis Felipe Castillo (1); Boxscore

Round 1

1 August 19:00 Yokohama Stadium
Team	1	2	3	4	5	6	7	8	9	R	H	E
Dominican Republic	1	0	0	2	0	0	0	0	0	3	6	0
South Korea	1	0	0	0	0	0	0	0	3	4	12	1
WP: Oh Seung-hwan (2–0) LP: Luis Felipe Castillo (0–1); Home runs: DOM: Juan Francisco (1); KOR: None; Boxscore

Round 1 repechage

3 August 19:00 Yokohama Stadium
Team	1	2	3	4	5	6	7	8	9	R	H	E
Israel	0	0	0	0	4	0	0	2	0	6	9	2
Dominican Republic	1	0	1	0	0	2	1	0	2	7	9	1
WP: Luis Felipe Castillo (1–1) LP: Zack Weiss (1–1); Home runs: ISR: Danny Valencia (3); DOM: Jeison Guzman (1), Johan Mieses (1); Boxscore

Round 2 repechage

4 August 12:00 Yokohama Stadium
Team	1	2	3	4	5	6	7	8	9	R	H	E
Dominican Republic	0	0	0	0	0	0	0	0	1	1	5	0
United States	2	0	0	0	1	0	0	0	X	3	3	3
WP: Scott Kazmir (1–0) LP: Denyi Reyes (0–1) Sv: David Robertson (2); Home runs: DOM: Charlie Valerio (1); USA: Triston Casas (3), Tyler Austin (2); Boxscore

Bronze medal game

7 August 12:00 Yokohama Stadium
Team	1	2	3	4	5	6	7	8	9	R	H	E
Dominican Republic	4	0	0	0	1	0	0	5	0	10	14	0
South Korea	0	1	0	1	4	0	0	0	0	6	13	0
WP: Cristopher Mercedes (1–0) LP: Oh Seung-hwan (2–1) Sv: Jumbo Díaz (1); Home runs: DOM: Juan Francisco (2), Julio Rodríguez (1), Johan Mieses (2); KOR: Hyun-soo Kim (3); Boxscore

== Boxing ==
Dominican Republic entered seven boxers (five men and two women) to compete in each of the following weight classes into the Olympic tournament. With the cancellation of the 2021 Pan American Qualification Tournament in Buenos Aires, all of them, led by Rio 2016 Olympian Leonel de los Santos (men's lightweight), finished among the top five of their respective weight divisions to secure their places on the Dominican Republic squad based on the IOC's Boxing Task Force Rankings for the Americas.

Athlete	Event	Round of 32	Round of 16	Quarterfinals	Semifinals	Final	
Athlete	Event	Opposition Result	Opposition Result	Opposition Result	Opposition Result	Opposition Result	Rank
Rodrigo Marte	Men's flyweight	Tetteh (GHA); L 2–3	Did not advance				
Alexy de la Cruz	Men's featherweight	Allicock (GUY); W 5–0	Batyrgaziev (ROC); L 0–5	Did not advance			
Rohan Polanco	Men's welterweight	Bye	Baturov (UZB); L 0–4	Did not advance			
Leonel de los Santos	Men's lightweight	Usmonov (TJK); L 1–4	Did not advance				
Euri Cedeño	Men's middleweight	Sella (EOR); W RSC	Verón (ARG); W 3–2	Khyzhniak (UKR); L 1–4	Did not advance		
Miguelina Hernández	Women's flyweight	Kom (IND); L 1–4	Did not advance				
María Moronta	Women's welterweight	Bye	Da Silva (CAN); W 5–0	Jones (USA); L 0–4	Did not advance		

== Diving ==
Dominican Republic entered one diver into the Olympic competition for the first time since Los Angeles 1984, by attaining a top 18 finish and securing the last of seven available berths in the men's springboard at the 2021 FINA Diving World Cup in Tokyo, Japan.

Athlete	Event	Preliminary		Semifinal		Final	
Athlete	Event	Points	Rank	Points	Rank	Points	Rank
Jonathan Ruvalcaba	Men's 3 m springboard	383.05	18 Q	398.65	13	Did not advance	

== Equestrian ==
Dominican Republic entered one equestrian rider into the Olympic competition by finishing among the top fifteen and securing the last of four available slots in the individual jumping at the 2019 Pan American Games in Lima, Peru. MeanwhIle, one dressage rider was added to the Dominican Republic roster by finishing in the top four, outside the group selection, of the individual FEI Olympic Rankings for Groups D and E (North, Central, and South America).

=== Dressage ===
Athlete	Horse	Event	Grand Prix		Grand Prix Freestyle		Overall	
Athlete	Horse	Event	Score	Rank	Technical	Artistic	Score	Rank
Yvonne Losos de Muñiz	Aquamarijn	Individual	70.869	22	Did not advance			22

Qualification Legend: Q = Qualified for the final; q = Qualified for the final as a lucky loser

=== Jumping ===
Athlete	Horse	Event	Qualification		Final		
Athlete	Horse	Event	Penalties	Rank	Penalties	Time	Rank
Hector Florentino	Carnaval	Individual	14	=60	Did not advance		

== Judo ==
Dominican Republic qualified one judoka for the men's middleweight category (90 kg) at the Games. Robert Florentino accepted a continental berth from the Americas as the nation's top-ranked judoka outside of direct qualifying position in the IJF World Ranking List of 28 June 2021.

Athlete	Event	Round of 64	Round of 32	Round of 16	Quarterfinals	Semifinals	Repechage	Final / BM	
Athlete	Event	Opposition Result	Opposition Result	Opposition Result	Opposition Result	Opposition Result	Opposition Result	Opposition Result	Rank
Robert Florentino	Men's −90 kg	Bye	Nhabali (UKR); L 00–01	Did not advance					

== Rowing ==
Dominican Republic qualified one boat in the men's single sculls for the Games by finishing fifth in the B-final and securing the last of five berths available at the 2021 FISA Americas Olympic Qualification Regatta in Rio de Janeiro, Brazil, marking the country's debut in the sport.

Athlete	Event	Heats		Repechage		Quarterfinals		Semifinals		Final	
Athlete	Event	Time	Rank	Time	Rank	Time	Rank	Time	Rank	Time	Rank
Ignacio Vásquez	Men's single sculls	7:43.71	5 R	7:42.83	3 SE/F	Bye		7:42.80	1 FE	7:25.88	25

Qualification Legend: FA=Final A (medal); FB=Final B (non-medal); FC=Final C (non-medal); FD=Final D (non-medal); FE=Final E (non-medal); FF=Final F (non-medal); SA/B=Semifinals A/B; SC/D=Semifinals C/D; SE/F=Semifinals E/F; QF=Quarterfinals; R=Repechage

== Swimming ==
Dominican Republic received a universality invitation from FINA to send two top-ranked swimmers (one per gender) in their respective individual events to the Olympics, based on the FINA Points System of 28 June 2021.

Athlete	Event	Heat		Semifinal		Final	
Athlete	Event	Time	Rank	Time	Rank	Time	Rank
Josué Domínguez	Men's 100 m breaststroke	1:01.86	39	Did not advance			
Josué Domínguez	Men's 200 m breaststroke	2:17.34	34	Did not advance			
Krystal Lara	Women's 100 m backstroke	1:03.07	35	Did not advance			
Krystal Lara	Women's 200 m backstroke	2:18.63	27	Did not advance			

== Taekwondo ==
Dominican Republic entered three athletes into the taekwondo competition at the Games. 2019 Pan American Games silver medalist Bernardo Pié (men's 68 kg), along with Rio 2016 Olympians Moisés Hernández (men's 80 kg) and Katherine Rodríguez (women's +67 kg), secured the spots on the Dominican Republic squad with a top two finish each in their respective weight classes at the 2020 Pan American Qualification Tournament in San José, Costa Rica.

Athlete	Event	Qualification Round	Round of 16	Quarterfinals	Semifinals	Repechage	Final / BM	
Athlete	Event	Opposition Result	Opposition Result	Opposition Result	Opposition Result	Opposition Result	Opposition Result	Rank
Bernardo Pié	Men's −68 kg	Bye	Achab (BEL); W 18–11	Zhao (CHN); L 8–13	Did not advance			
Moisés Hernández	Men's −80 kg	—N/a	Rafalovich (UZB); L 7–17	Did not advance				
Katherine Rodríguez	Women's +67 kg	—N/a	Kuş (TUR); W 7–5	Lee (KOR); L 14–23	Did not advance	Traoré (CIV); L 9–11	Did not advance	

== Volleyball ==
=== Indoor ===
Summary

Team	Event	Group stage						Quarterfinal	Semifinal	Final / BM	
Team	Event	Opposition Score	Opposition Score	Opposition Score	Opposition Score	Opposition Score	Rank	Opposition Score	Opposition Score	Opposition Score	Rank
Dominican Republic women's	Women's tournament	Serbia; L 0–3	Brazil; L 2–3	South Korea; L 2–3	Kenya; W 3–0	Japan; W 3–1	4	United States; L 0–3	Did not advance		

==== Women's tournament ====
Dominican Republic women's volleyball team qualified for the Olympics by winning the pool round and securing an outright berth at the North American Olympic Qualification Tournament in Santo Domingo, marking the country's recurrence to the sport after an eight-year absence.

Team roster

The Dominican Republic roster was announced on 10 July 2021.

Head coach: (Brazil) Marcos Kwiek

- 1 Annerys Vargas MB
- 3 Lisvel Elisa Eve MB
- 5 Brenda Castillo L
- 6 Camil Domínguez S
- 7 Niverka Marte S
- 14 Prisilla Rivera (c) OH
- 16 Yonkaira Peña OH
- 18 Bethania de la Cruz OH
- 20 Brayelin Martínez OH
- 21 Jineiry Martínez MB
- 23 Gaila González OP
- 25 Larysmer Martínez L

Group play

Pos	Team	Pld	W	L	Pts	SW	SL	SR	SPW	SPL	SPR	Qualification
1	Brazil	5	5	0	14	15	3	5.000	434	315	1.378	Quarter-finals
2	Serbia	5	4	1	12	13	3	4.333	381	313	1.217	Quarter-finals
3	South Korea	5	3	2	7	9	10	0.900	374	415	0.901	Quarter-finals
4	Dominican Republic	5	2	3	8	10	10	1.000	411	406	1.012	Quarter-finals
5	Japan (H)	5	1	4	4	6	12	0.500	378	395	0.957	
6	Kenya	5	0	5	0	0	15	0.000	242	376	0.644	

Source: Tokyo 2020 and FIVB
Rules for classification: Tiebreakers
(H) Host

25 July 2021; 14:20	Serbia	3–0	Dominican Republic	Ariake Arena, Tokyo; Referees: Kang Joo-hee (KOR), Evgeny Makshanov (RUS)
25 July 2021; 14:20	(25–18, 25–12, 25–20); Results Statistics			Ariake Arena, Tokyo; Referees: Kang Joo-hee (KOR), Evgeny Makshanov (RUS)

27 July 2021; 19:40	Brazil	3–2	Dominican Republic	Ariake Arena, Tokyo; Referees: Susana Rodríguez (ESP), Vladimir Simonović (SRB)
27 July 2021; 19:40	(22–25, 25–17, 25–13, 23–25, 15–12); Results Statistics			Ariake Arena, Tokyo; Referees: Susana Rodríguez (ESP), Vladimir Simonović (SRB)

29 July 2021; 11:05	South Korea	3–2	Dominican Republic	Ariake Arena, Tokyo; Referees: Hernán Casamiquela (ARG), Shin Muranaka (JPN)
29 July 2021; 11:05	(25–20, 17–25, 25–18, 15–25, 15–12); Results Statistics			Ariake Arena, Tokyo; Referees: Hernán Casamiquela (ARG), Shin Muranaka (JPN)

31 July 2021; 09:00	Dominican Republic	3–0	Kenya	Ariake Arena, Tokyo; Referees: Kang Joo-hee (KOR), Patricia Rolf (USA)
31 July 2021; 09:00	(25–19, 25–18, 25–10); Results Statistics			Ariake Arena, Tokyo; Referees: Kang Joo-hee (KOR), Patricia Rolf (USA)

2 August 2021; 19:40	Japan	1–3	Dominican Republic	Ariake Arena, Tokyo; Referees: Patricia Rolf (USA), Wojciech Maroszek (POL)
2 August 2021; 19:40	(10–25, 23–25, 25–19, 19–25); Results Statistics			Ariake Arena, Tokyo; Referees: Patricia Rolf (USA), Wojciech Maroszek (POL)

Quarterfinal

4 August 2021; 13:00	Dominican Republic	0–3	United States	Ariake Arena, Tokyo; Referees: Luis Macias (MEX), Kang Joo-hee (KOR)
4 August 2021; 13:00	(11–25, 20–25, 19–25); Results Statistics			Ariake Arena, Tokyo; Referees: Luis Macias (MEX), Kang Joo-hee (KOR)

== Weightlifting ==
Dominican Republic entered five weightlifters (two men and three women) into the Olympic competition. Two-time Olympian Beatriz Pirón (women's 49 kg), Crismery Santana (women's 87 kg), and Verónica Saladín (women's 87 kg) secured one of the top eight slots each in their respective weight divisions based on the IWF Absolute World Ranking. Meanwhile, Rio 2016 Olympian Luis García and rookie Zacarías Bonnat topped the field of weightlifters vying for qualification from the Americas in the men's 61 and 81 kg category, respectively, based on the IWF Absolute Continental Rankings.

Athlete	Event	Snatch		Clean & Jerk		Total	Rank
Athlete	Event	Result	Rank	Result	Rank	Total	Rank
Luis García	Men's −61 kg	120	11	154	8	274	8
Zacarías Bonnat	Men's −81 kg	163	6	204	2	367	2nd place, silver medalist(s)
Beatriz Pirón	Women's −49 kg	81	6	95	10	176	8
Crismery Santana	Women's −87 kg	116	2	140	4	256	3rd place, bronze medalist(s)
Verónica Saladín	Women's +87 kg	111	6	131	7	242	7

== See also ==
- Dominican Republic at the 2019 Pan American Games
