= Yamaico Navarro =

Dominican baseball player (born 1987)

- Navarro with the Leones del Escogido in 2026

Leones del Escogido – No. 8
- Second baseman
- Born: October 31, 1987 (age 39); San Pedro de Macorís, Dominican Republic
- Bats: Right Throws: Right

Professional debut
- MLB: August 20, 2010, for the Boston Red Sox
- KBO: March 29, 2014, for the Samsung Lions
- NPB: April 23, 2016, for the Chiba Lotte Marines

MLB statistics (through 2013 season)
- Batting average: .206
- Home runs: 2
- Runs batted in: 20

KBO statistics (through 2015 season)
- Batting average: .297
- Home runs: 79
- Runs batted in: 235

NPB statistics (through 2016 season)
- Batting average: .217
- Home runs: 10
- Runs batted in: 44
- Stats at Baseball Reference

Teams
- Boston Red Sox (2010–2011); Kansas City Royals (2011); Pittsburgh Pirates (2012); Baltimore Orioles (2013); Samsung Lions (2014–2015); Chiba Lotte Marines (2016)

Career highlights and awards
- KBO: Korean Series Champion (2014); Korean Series MVP (2014); KBO All-Star (2015); KBO League Golden Glove Award (2015)

Yamaico Navarro Pérez (born October 31, 1987) is a Dominican professional baseball infielder for the Olmecas de Tabasco of the Mexican League. He has previously played in Major League Baseball (MLB) for the Boston Red Sox, Kansas City Royals, Pittsburgh Pirates, and Baltimore Orioles. He has also played in the KBO League for the Samsung Lions, and in Nippon Professional Baseball (NPB) for the Chiba Lotte Marines.

== Career ==
=== Boston Red Sox ===
Navarro was born in San Pedro de Macorís and signed by scout Pablo Lantigua. He began his professional career in 2006, with the DSL Red Sox. He hit .279 in 53 games. The following year, he played for the Lowell Spinners, hitting .289 in 62 games. In 2008, Navarro played for the Greenville Drive (83 games) and Lancaster JetHawks (42 games), hitting a combined .304 with 11 home runs in 125 games. In 2009, he played for the Spinners (five games), Salem Red Sox (23 games) and Portland Sea Dogs (39 games), hitting a combined .240 in 67 games. Navarro hit .275 with 11 home runs for the Sea Dogs (88 games) and Pawtucket Red Sox (16 games) prior to his August 20, 2010, call-up.

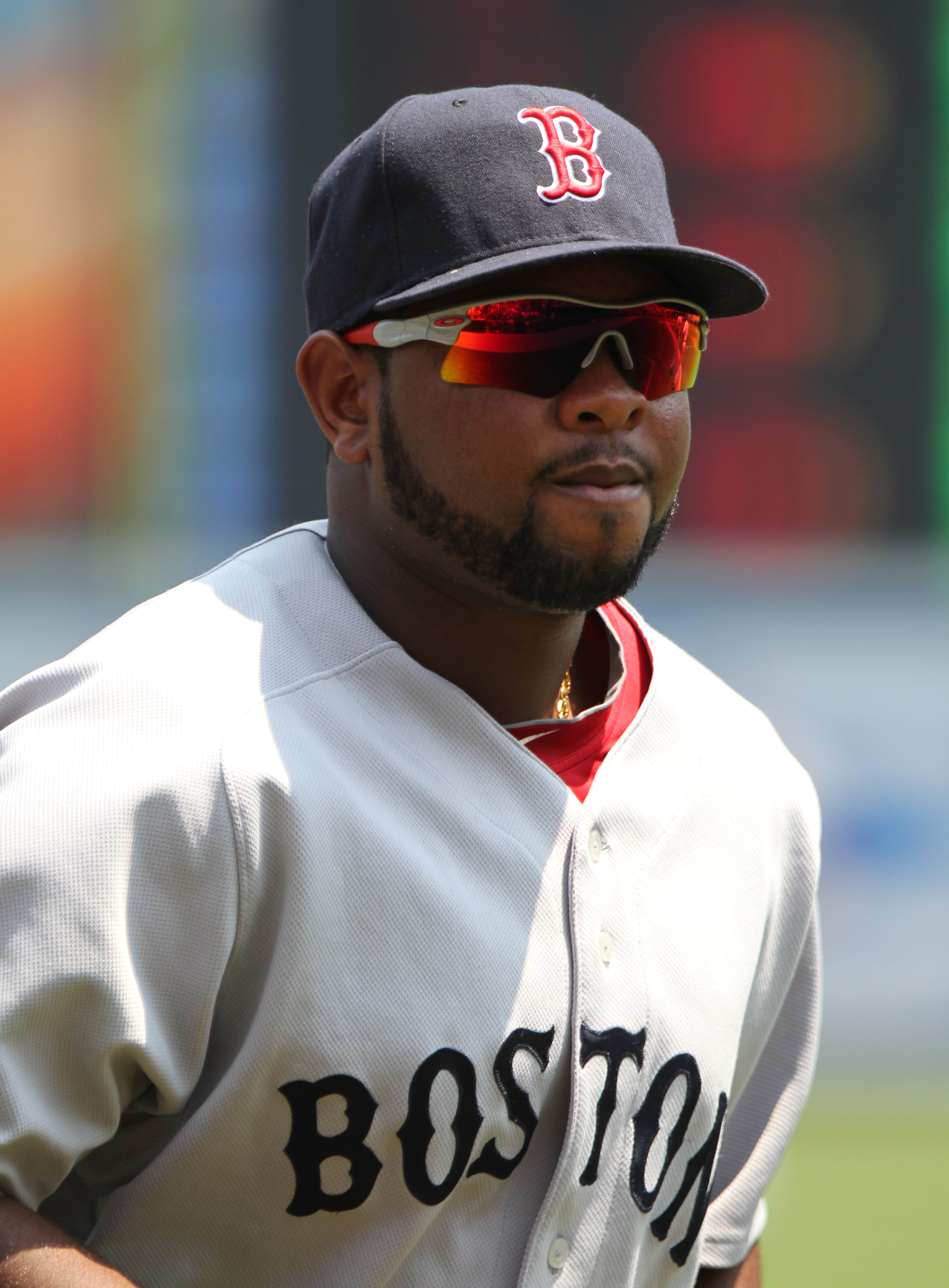
Navarro playing for the Red Sox in 2011

Navarro was added to the Red Sox 40 man roster and called up on August 20, 2010, when Dustin Pedroia went on the disabled list. Navarro made his Major League debut against the Toronto Blue Jays that same day.

On July 2, 2011, Navarro hit his first career home run off Houston Astros pitcher J. A. Happ.

=== Kansas City Royals ===
On July 30, 2011, Navarro was traded to the Kansas City Royals along with minor league pitcher Kendal Volz for infielder Mike Avilés.

On August 4, 2011, Navarro picked up his first RBI in a Kansas City Royals uniform, going 1-for-4 at the plate with a walk and 3 RBIs in a 9–4 victory over the Baltimore Orioles.

The next day, Navarro was optioned to the Omaha Storm Chasers to allow room for Johnny Giavotella.

=== Pittsburgh Pirates ===
Navarro was traded to the Pittsburgh Pirates following the 2011 season in exchange for Brooks Pounders and Diego Goris. On July 4, 2012, Navarro was arrested for driving under the influence in Indianapolis. Navarro was released after spending one night in jail. On August 16, Navarro was called up after Neil Walker was injured during a game against the Los Angeles Dodgers.

=== Baltimore Orioles ===
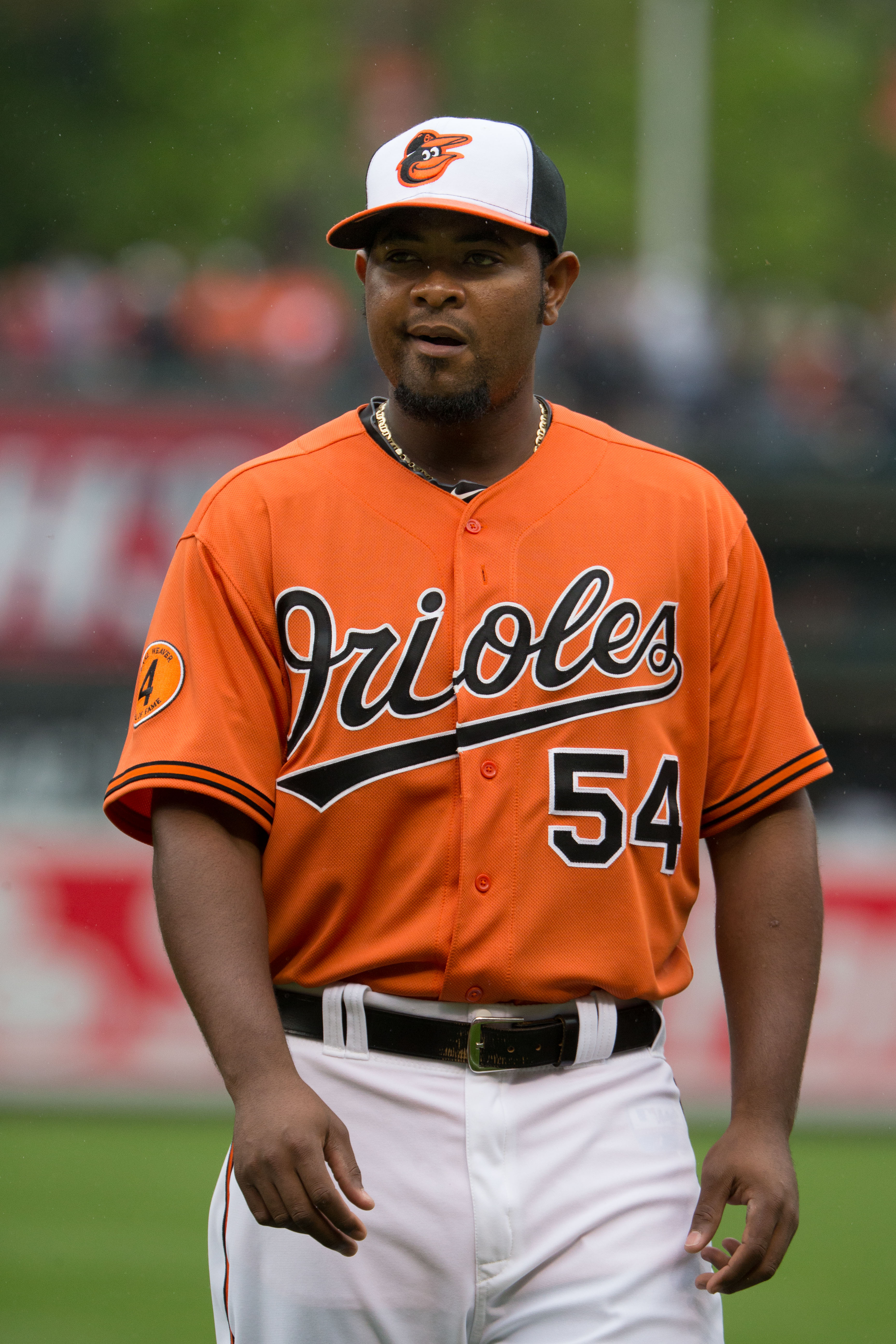
Navarro with the Baltimore Orioles in 2013

On November 30, 2012, Navarro was traded to the Baltimore Orioles in exchange for Jhondaniel Medina. In 8 games for the Orioles, he went 8–for–28 (.286) with 2 RBI and 2 walks. Navarro was designated for assignment by Baltimore on June 18, 2013. He cleared waivers and was sent outright to the Triple–A Norfolk Tides on June 26. Navarro elected free agency on November 4.

=== Samsung Lions ===
Navarro signed a minor league deal with the New York Yankees on November 19, 2013. The Yankees released Navarro so that he could sign with the Samsung Lions of the KBO League.

In 2014, his first KBO season, Navarro batted .308 and smacked 31 home runs (fifth in the league) with 98 RBI (ninth) and 25 stolen bases (eleventh), hitting leadoff in the order and playing second base. Navarro led the Lions to their fourth consecutive Korean Series title, tying Tyrone Woods' single Korean Series-record with four home runs, and his performance earned him the Korean Series Most Valuable Player Award. His 2015 season was even more impressive, as Navarro hit .287 with 48 home runs (2nd in the league) and 137 RBI (third). He was a 2015 KBO All-Star and was given a KBO Golden Glove Award in the outfielder category.

=== Chiba Lotte Marines ===
Navarro signed a free agent contract with the Chiba Lotte Marines of Nippon Professional Baseball on January 13, 2016.

=== Sultanes de Monterrey ===
On April 3, 2019, Navarro signed with the Sultanes de Monterrey of the Mexican League. He was a LMB All-Star for the year, hitting .294/.409/.565 with 30 home runs and 100 RBI across 109 games. Navarro did not play in a game in 2020 due to the cancellation of the Mexican League season because of the COVID-19 pandemic.

On February 20, 2021, Navarro signed with the Fubon Guardians of the Chinese Professional Baseball League. However, the league did not allow the contract to take effect due to his criminal record.

On May 5, 2021, Navarro was released by the Sultanes so that he could represent the Dominican Republic at the Americas Qualifying Event for the 2020 Summer Olympics. However, he did not end up competing in the event. On June 30, Navarro re-signed with the Sultanes for the remainder of the season. In 19 games for the team during the year, he batted .338/.420/.634 with six home runs and 15 RBI. Navarro became a free agent after the season.

On March 7, 2023, Navarro re-signed with the Sultanes. He played in 48 games for Monterrey, batting .267/.373/.366 with three home runs and 22 RBI. Navarro was released by the team on August 1.

=== Olmecas de Tabasco ===
On March 13, 2025, Navarro signed with the Olmecas de Tabasco of the Mexican League. In 77 games he hit .308/.384/.527 with 16 home runs, 51 RBIs and 4 stolen bases.

== Personal life ==
On February 21, 2016, Navarro was arrested in Okinawa, Japan for concealing a bullet in his luggage. The bullet was discovered in Navarro's carry on bag during a security check for a domestic flight at Okinawa's airport. Possessing the bullet was a violation of Japan's firearms law. Navarro told police the bullet was from his home in the Dominican Republic but that he was not aware it was in his bag.
