= Jhondaniel Medina =

Venezuelan baseball player (born 1993)

Free agent
- Pitcher
- Born: February 8, 1993 (age 33); Maracay, Venezuela
- Bats: Right Throws: Right
- Stats at Baseball Reference

Jhondaniel (Ostos) Medina (born February 8, 1993) is a Venezuelan professional baseball pitcher who is a free agent.

== Career ==
=== Baltimore Orioles ===
On December 14, 2009, Medina signed with the Baltimore Orioles as an amateur free agent. He made his professional debut in 2010, posting a 2.32 ERA in 10 starts. He spent the 2011 season with the Dominican Summer League Orioles, for whom he had played the previous year. In 14 games (13 starts), he registered a 5–4 record and 3.02 ERA with 60 strikeouts in 65 2/3 innings pitched.

Medina spent the 2012 season with the rookie–level Gulf Coast Orioles, also pitching in one game for the Low–A Aberdeen IronBirds. In 10 games (7 starts), he recorded a 3.72 ERA with 47 strikeouts and 2 saves in 46.0 innings of work.

=== Pittsburgh Pirates ===
On November 30, 2012, Medina was traded to the Pittsburgh Pirates in exchange for Yamaico Navarro. In his first season with the Pirates organization, Medina pitched in 37 games split between the Single–A West Virginia Power and High–A Bradenton Marauders; he posted a 1.96 ERA with 68 strikeouts and 13 saves in 46.0 innings of work. He returned to Bradenton for the 2014 season, and logged a stellar 0.72 ERA with 47 strikeouts and 3 saves across 35 appearances.

In 2015, he spent the year with the Double–A Altoona Curve. In 45 appearances, he posted a 2.76 ERA with 44 strikeouts and a career–high 12 saves in 62.0 innings pitched. Medina began the 2016 season back in Double–A Altoona. He pitched in 46 games split between Altoona and the Triple–A Indianapolis Indians, accumulating a 3.49 ERA with 70 strikeouts in 69 2/3 innings of work. He elected free agency following the season on November 7, 2016.

=== Chicago Cubs ===
On December 19, 2016, Medina signed a minor league contract with the Chicago Cubs organization. He was assigned to the Double–A Tennessee Smokies to begin the 2017 season, where he made 7 appearances and struggled to an 11.57 ERA with 5 strikeouts in 7.0 innings pitched. Medina was released by the Cubs on May 12, 2017.

=== Los Angeles Angels ===
On June 21, 2017, Medina signed a minor league contract with the Los Angeles Angels organization. He split the season between the High–A Inland Empire 66ers and Double–A Mobile BayBears. His results in Mobile (2.89 ERA, 32 strikeouts) were markedly better than those in Inland Empire (8.00 ERA, 15 strikeouts), and he appeared in 22 games for the organization down the stretch. Medina elected free agency following the season on November 6.

== International career ==
Medina was selected as a member of the Venezuela national baseball team at the 2017 World Baseball Classic.
