= Brooks Pounders =

American baseball player (born 1990)

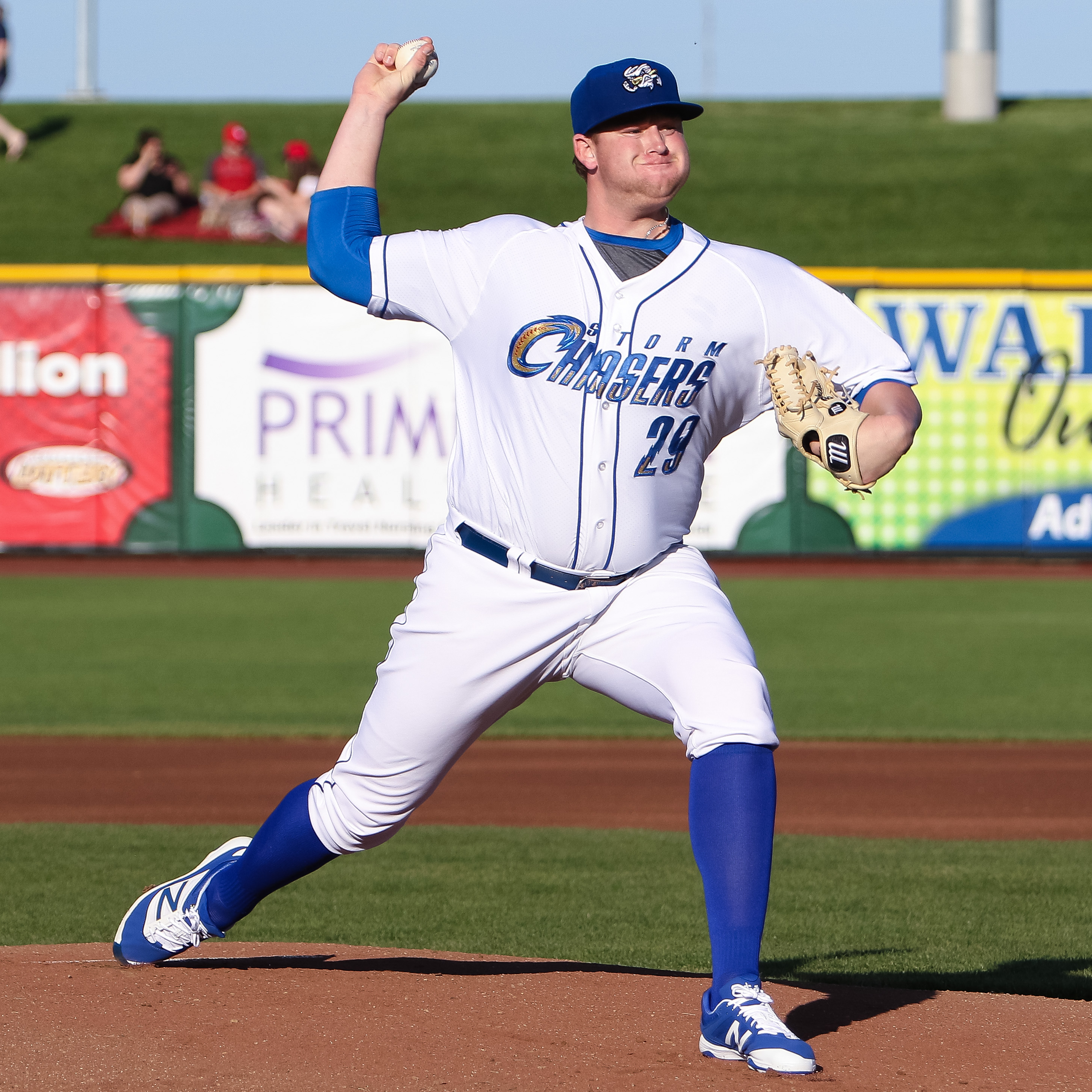
- Pounders pitching for the Omaha Storm Chasers in 2016
- Pitcher
- Born: September 26, 1990 (age 35); Riverside, California, U.S.
- Batted: Right Threw: Right

MLB debut
- July 5, 2016, for the Kansas City Royals

Last MLB appearance
- June 29, 2019, for the New York Mets

MLB statistics
- Win–loss record: 4–2
- Earned run average: 8.47
- Strikeouts: 47
- Stats at Baseball Reference

Teams
- Kansas City Royals (2016); Los Angeles Angels (2017); Colorado Rockies (2018); New York Mets (2019)
Medals
Men's baseball
Representing United States
WBSC Premier12
Silver medal – second place	2015 Tokyo	Team

Brooks Casey Pounders (born September 26, 1990) is an American former professional baseball pitcher. He attended Temecula Valley High School in Temecula, California, and chose not to attend college after he was drafted by the Pittsburgh Pirates in 2009. After playing in the minor leagues for the Pirates, he was traded to the Kansas City Royals after the 2011 season. While in the Royals' minor league system, Pounders threw a no-hitter for the Northwest Arkansas Naturals in 2013. He made his major league debut with the Royals in 2016, and he was traded to the Los Angeles Angels after the season ended.

Pounders spent 2017 alternating between the Angels' major league club and the minor leagues, before becoming a free agent at the end of the season. Before the 2018 season, Pounders signed a contract with the Colorado Rockies and played for both the Rockies and their Triple A-level affiliate. Again a free agent after the 2018 season, Pounders signed with the Cleveland Indians, but never played a major league game with the team. On June 15, he was traded to the New York Mets and immediately became part of the Mets' major league team. He played briefly with the team before being sent back down to the minor league Syracuse Mets. Pounders was part of the United States national baseball team in the 2015 and 2019 WBSC Premier12 tournaments.

== Early life ==
Brooks Casey Pounders was born on September 26, 1990, in Riverside, California, to Brad and Mary Pounders. His father, who had been an infielder in Minor League Baseball, wanted to give Pounders the first and middle names Brooks Robinson after the Baltimore Orioles player of the same name, but Mary Pounders objected.

Pounders attended Temecula Valley High School in Temecula, where he played baseball. When he was a junior at Temecula Valley, he committed to the University of Southern California (USC) baseball team. As a high school senior, Pounders had a 9–2 win–loss record with a 1.96 earned run average (ERA) and 91 strikeouts in 64 1/3 innings pitched. The Pittsburgh Pirates then drafted Pounders in the second round of the 2009 Major League Baseball draft, so he did not attend USC. He received a $670,000 signing bonus from the Pirates.

== Career ==
=== Pittsburgh Pirates ===
The Pirates assigned Pounders to the Gulf Coast League Pirates, a rookie-level team. In 2009, he appeared in nine games, starting four of them, pitching in a total of 23 2/3 innings. Over that span, Pounders struck out 20 batters and had a 3.04 ERA and 2–2 win–loss record. The next season, Pounders was assigned to the State College Spikes, a short-season team at the Single A level. In 2010, Pounders pitched in 16 games, four of them starts, with an ERA of 4.46 in 42 1/3 innings. He won three games, lost three, and recorded a save. That season, the Pittsburgh Post-Gazette reported that coaches had been working with Pounders about fixing problems in his pitching mechanics, and reported success in the effort. Mike Steele, Pounders' pitching coach at State College, reported that he was a "warrior-makeup guy" and that "his mind and his makeup are ahead of what his body will allow him to do". Team management also stated that they believed that Pounders needed to gain muscle mass, and noted that he had been working out since being drafted. He was reported to be focusing on the "physical aspect of the game" that season.

Pounders spent 2011 pitching for the West Virginia Power of the South Atlantic League. He started only one of the 36 games he appeared in, although he did record a 5–5 win–loss record with three saves. Over 66 innings, he recorded a 3.68 ERA and struck out 72 batters. On December 7, the Pirates traded Pounders and Diego Goris, an infielder, to the Kansas City Royals for Yamaico Navarro, another infielder. Pounders later stated that he felt that Pittsburgh had given up on him, but that his transition to Kansas City was easy.

=== Kansas City Royals ===
After reporting to the Royals, Pounders was assigned to the Wilmington Blue Rocks, a Class A team. During the 2012 season, he played for both the Blue Rocks and the Kane County Cougars, another Class A team. Between the two teams, Pounders pitched in 28 games and started 23 of them. Over a career-high 134 innings, he won nine games, lost six, and had a 3.96 ERA. He also was named the Carolina League pitcher of the week for the week of August 20. In 2013, Pounders played for the Northwest Arkansas Naturals, a team in the Double A Texas League. On June 27, he threw a no-hitter for the Naturals against the Midland RockHounds. Only two RockHounds batters reached base against Pounders: one on an error, and one via a hit by pitch. Pounders' no-hitter was the first one thrown by a single Naturals pitcher (not a combined no-hitter) in the team's history. After the no-hitter, he was named Texas League pitcher of the week for the week of July 1. His final line for the season was a 5–7 record with a 4.50 ERA in 116 innings; he also recorded a save.

Pounders underwent Tommy John surgery after the 2013 season, and he was only able to pitch in nine games the next season. These nine games were played for the Blue Rocks and the Idaho Falls Chukars of the rookie-level Pioneer League; he went 0–2 with a 4.40 ERA in 30 2/3 innings for the two teams. Pounders missed the beginning of the 2015 season with a shoulder injury. During the 2015 season, he played for four teams: the Chukars, the rookie-level Arizona League Royals, the Blue Rocks, and the Naturals. Pounders started all 15 games he pitched in, winning three (all with the Naturals) and losing five. Between the four teams, he had a 2.50 ERA over 68 1/3 innings; most of the innings were thrown with the Naturals. After the season, on October 21, 2015, he was selected for the United States national baseball team in the 2015 WBSC Premier12. Over the course of the tournament, Pounders made six pitching appearances and recorded a save, although his ERA was 6.14 in 7 1/3 innings. The United States team finished second in the tournament. He also pitched for the Surprise Saguaros of the Arizona Fall League, pitching 12 scoreless innings with one win and the honor of league pitcher of the week for the week of October 24.

In 2016, Pounders received a major league spring training invitation for the first time in his career. Pounders acknowledged that he had a low chance of remaining in the major leagues for the regular season. "For them to come off a World Series and then get an invite to camp was surreal. We have a great staff and it'll be tough to crack as a non-roster invitee, but knowing you get to pitch with the big league guys and in front of big league coaches is an incredible opportunity," he said.

Pounders started the 2016 season with the Triple A-level Omaha Storm Chasers. With the Storm Chasers, Pounders recorded a 2.80 ERA over 64 1/3 innings before being called up to the major leagues by the Royals after Wade Davis was put on the disabled list with a forearm injury on July 5. That same day, Pounders made his major league debut in an 8–3 loss to the Toronto Blue Jays. Pounders pitched two innings, giving up one run and striking out three batters. Two days later, Pounders got the win in a game against the Seattle Mariners for his first major league win. On July 10, Pounders made his third major league appearance, again against the Mariners. In that game, he gave up five runs in the seventh inning. Pounders returned to Omaha on July 16, but was brought up on July 28 when Luke Hochevar went on the disabled list with symptoms of thoracic outlet syndrome.

Pounders next pitched for the Royals on July 30, against the Texas Rangers; he gave up one run while only recording two outs in the ninth inning, taking his first major league loss. Royals manager Ned Yost stated he was considering letting Pounders pitch the next inning before Mitch Moreland hit a home run to win the game for the Rangers; Pounders remarked that the pitch was intended to be low and away from the batter, but "caught too much of the plate". He was then returned to Omaha again on August 3, but was recalled to Kansas City on the 31st. Pounders appeared in nine more games for the Royals over the course of the season, including picking up his second major league win against the Minnesota Twins on September 27. Over the course of the 2016 season, he had with a 9.24 ERA in 12 2/3 innings pitched for Kansas City, and a 3.14 ERA in 80 1/3 innings for Omaha. Due to his early-season efforts with the Storm Chasers, he was named to the Pacific Coast League Mid-Season All-Star Team.

=== Los Angeles Angels ===
On December 1, the Royals traded Pounders to the Los Angeles Angels for minor-league pitcher Jared Ruxer. Over the course of the 2017 season, Pounders bounced between the Angels and the Triple A Salt Lake Bees. He made his Angels debut on April 23 against the Blue Jays; two days later he received the win in a game against the Oakland Athletics. At the major league level, Pounders pitched in three games in April, two in May, four in June, and two in July. He finished the season with a 10.45 ERA and 1–0 record for the Angels, and a 2–2 record with a 2.63 ERA in 38 games (two starts) for the Bees. He elected to become a free agent on November 6.

=== Colorado Rockies ===
On December 5, Pounders signed a minor league contract with the Colorado Rockies; he was sent to the Triple A Albuquerque Isotopes on January 28, 2018. He was then called back up the major leagues by the Rockies on April 24; he had recorded a 3.60 ERA in seven games with the Isotopes prior to the call-up. That day, Pounders threw a scoreless ninth inning against the San Diego Padres. Four days later, he pitched a scoreless eighth against the Miami Marlins. During the month of May, Pounders made six pitching appearances, including pitching a season-high three innings against the San Francisco Giants on May 19. On June 1, he blew a save and took the loss against the Los Angeles Dodgers by allowing four runs without recording an out in the sixth inning. He made five more appearances that month, all in games decided by five or more runs, before being returned to the Isotopes on June 27. During his tenure with the Rockies, Pounders had an 0–1 record with a 7.63 ERA in 15 1/3 innings. He appeared in 26 games with the Isotopes, recording a 2–3 record and a 3.48 ERA. He elected free agency on October 9, 2018.

=== Cleveland Indians ===
On December 22, 2018, Pounders signed a minor league contract with the Cleveland Indians. The deal included an invitation to the Indians' 2019 major league spring training camp. While in the Indians organization, Pounders was assigned to the Columbus Clippers of the Triple A International League for the 2019 season. With the Clippers, Pounders appeared in 24 games, all in relief, with a 2–1 record and a 2.31 ERA.

=== New York Mets ===
On June 15, the Indians traded Pounders to the New York Mets for cash considerations. The Mets, who had a bad bullpen, promoted Pounders from Triple A to their major league team. The team's manager Mickey Callaway stated that he had seen improvement in Pounders' slider. He made his first appearance with the Mets the next day, pitching a scoreless ninth inning against the St. Louis Cardinals. On June 21, Pounders picked up the win against the Chicago Cubs by throwing 1 1/3 scoreless innings. In total, he appeared in seven games for the Mets, all in the month of June. All of Pounders' outings were scoreless, except for one against the Philadelphia Phillies on June 24, in which he allowed five runs while only recording five outs. On July 2, the Mets sent Pounders down to the Triple A Syracuse Mets. He was then designated for assignment on August 20 and outrighted back to Syracuse three days later. While with the major-league Mets, he had an ERA of 6.14 (his lowest in a major league season), and a 1–0 record; with Syracuse, he had a 1–2 record in 19 games, along with a 7.59 ERA.

=== Tampa Bay Rays ===
After the end of the 2019 season, he was selected for the United States national baseball team in the 2019 WBSC Premier12. Pounders appeared in two games for the team, throwing two scoreless innings. On February 15, 2020, the Tampa Bay Rays signed Pounders to a minor league contract. Later that month, he was sent to the Triple A Durham Bulls; the Bulls released him on May 27. Pounders bats and throws right-handed. He has appeared in 45 major league games and pitched 45 2/3 innings with a 4–2 record, an 8.47 career ERA, and 47 strikeouts. Pounders has not had a plate appearance as a batter in the major leagues.

=== Seattle Mariners ===
On May 7, 2021, Pounders signed a minor league contract with the Seattle Mariners organization and was assigned to the Tacoma Rainiers two days later. He was placed on the 7-day injured last on May 22, after suffering an injury in the sixth inning of a game against the Salt Lake Bees. Pounders registered a 27.00 ERA across 3 appearances for Tacoma and was released by the organization on September 20.
