= Gabriel Arias (pitcher) =

Dominican Republic baseball player (born 1986)

- Pitcher
- Born: December 6, 1989 (age 36); Licey al Medio, Dominican Republic
- Bats: Right Throws: Right
Medals
Men's baseball
Representing Dominican Republic
Olympic Games
| Bronze medal – third place | 2020 Tokyo | Team |

Gabriel DeJesus Arias (born December 6, 1989) is a Dominican Republic former professional baseball pitcher.

== Career ==
=== Philadelphia Phillies ===
On July 24, 2007, Arias signed with the Philadelphia Phillies as an international free agent. He appeared in 4 games for the Dominican Summer League Phillies to begin his professional career. In 2008, Arias recorded a 2.63 ERA in 17 appearances for the DSL Phillies. He would improve with the team the following two years, posting ERAs of 2.29 (in 17 games) and 1.22 (in 14 games) respectively. Arias spent the 2011 season with the Low-A Williamsport Crosscutters, working to a 2.97 ERA with 31 strikeouts in 24 appearances. He split the 2012 season between the High-A Clearwater Threshers and the Single-A Lakewood BlueClaws, accumulating a 3.65 ERA with 106 strikeouts in 101.0 innings across 37 contests. Arias returned to Clearwater the following year, pitching to a 2.47 ERA in 12 games. On November 4, 2013, Arias elected free agency.

=== Cleveland Indians ===
On December 19, 2013, Arias signed a minor league contract with the Cleveland Indians. Arias spent 2014 split between the Triple-A Columbus Clippers and the Double-A Akron RubberDucks, posting a 14-6 record and 3.68 ERA in 27 games. He elected free agency on November 4, 2014.

=== Arizona Diamondbacks ===
On November 19, 2014, Arias signed a minor league contract with the Arizona Diamondbacks. In 2015, he played the season with the Triple-A Reno Aces and Double-A Mobile BayBears, accumulating an 11-6 record and 4.48 ERA with 85 strikeouts in 128 2/3 innings pitched across 24 contests (23 of them starts). On November 6, 2015, Arias elected free agency.

=== Washington Nationals ===
Arias did not play affiliated ball in 2016 and signed a minor league contract with the Washington Nationals on December 23, 2016. He spent the 2017 season with the Triple-A Syracuse Chiefs, but pitched in only 2 games due to injury. He elected free agency on November 6, 2017.

=== Algodoneros de Unión Laguna ===
On July 12, 2018, Arias signed with the Algodoneros de Unión Laguna of the Mexican League. Arias made 10 starts for the club down the stretch, but struggled to a 7.64 ERA in 55 1/3 innings of work.

=== Leones de Yucatán ===
On April 13, 2019, Arias signed with the Leones de Yucatán of the Mexican League. Arias tossed 6.0 innings of 7.50 ERA ball in 7 appearances before he was released on May 4.

=== Pericos de Puebla ===
On June 26, 2019, Arias signed with the Pericos de Puebla of the Mexican League. Arias recorded a 3.00 ERA in 12 appearances for the team in 2019. Arias did not play in a game in 2020 due to the cancellation of the Mexican League season because of the COVID-19 pandemic. Arias re-signed with the team on June 10, 2021, and pitched in only 3 games due to a shoulder injury, striking out 10 and allowing 4 earned runs in 11 2/3 innings of work. On October 20, Arias was released by Puebla.

== International career ==
Arias replaced Diego Goris on the Dominican Republic national baseball team for the 2020 Summer Olympics, contested in July 2021, after Goris tested positive for cannabis.
