= Édgar Arredondo =

Mexican baseball player (born 1997)

Acereros de Monclova – No. 17
- Pitcher
- Born: May 16, 1997 (age 28); Culiacán, Sinaloa, Mexico
- Bats: Right Throws: Right

Édgar Isaac Arredondo Guzmán (born May 16, 1997) is a Mexican professional baseball pitcher for the Acereros de Monclova of the Mexican League. He is also a member of the Mexican national baseball team, competing in the 2020 Summer Olympics.

== Career ==
=== Tigres de Quintana Roo ===
Arrendondo made his professional baseball debut for the Tigres de Quintana Roo of the Mexican League on April 18, 2013, when he was 15 years, 11 months, and 2 days old. He became the youngest player to debut in the Mexican League.

=== Texas Rangers ===
On July 4, 2013, Arredondo signed a minor league contract with the Texas Rangers organization. Arredondo made his organization debut in 2015, pitching in 11 games for the rookie-level AZL Rangers and posting a 3.97 ERA with 22 strikeouts in 22.2 innings of work. In 2016, Arredondo played for the Dominican Summer League Rangers, registering a 6–2 record and 1.60 ERA with 56 strikeouts in 62.0 innings pitched. The following season, Arredondo played for the Single-A Hickory Crawdads, pitching to a 6–6 record and 3.86 ERA in 22 appearances.

In 2018, Arredondo began the season with the Down East Wood Ducks of the High-A Carolina League. He was twice named the Carolina League's player of the week, and played in the Carolina League's all-star game. He was promoted to the Frisco RoughRiders of the Double-A Texas League in June. In 2019, Arredondo spent the whole season with the RoughRiders, where he registered a 7–3 record with a 4.17 ERA and 75 strikeouts over 101 1/3 innings pitched. He appeared in the Texas League's all-star game in 2019. On March 26, 2020, the Rangers released Arredondo.

On April 17, 2020, Arredondo signed with the Tigres de Quintana Roo of the Mexican League, the team with whom he had started his career. Arredondo did not play in a game in 2020 due to the cancellation of the Mexican League season because of the COVID-19 pandemic. On December 12, Arredondo was traded to the Acereros de Monclova of the Mexican League.

=== Arizona Diamondbacks ===
On January 12, 2021, Arredondo signed a minor league contract with the Arizona Diamondbacks organization. He began the season with the Double-A Amarillo Sod Poodles, posting a 4–1 record with a 3.27 ERA in 14 appearances out of the bullpen. He was later promoted to the Triple-A Reno Aces. He elected free agency following the season.

=== Acereros de Monclova ===
On February 14, 2022, Arredondo signed with the Acereros de Monclova of the Mexican League.

== International career ==
Arredondo pitches for the Tomateros de Culiacán of the Mexican Pacific League, and competed at the 2021 Caribbean Series.

In July 2021, Arredondo was a last-minute addition to Team Mexico at the 2020 Summer Olympics. He replaced Héctor Velázquez, who did not make the trip to Tokyo after testing positive for COVID-19.
