= Charlie Valerio =

Dominican baseball player (born 1990)

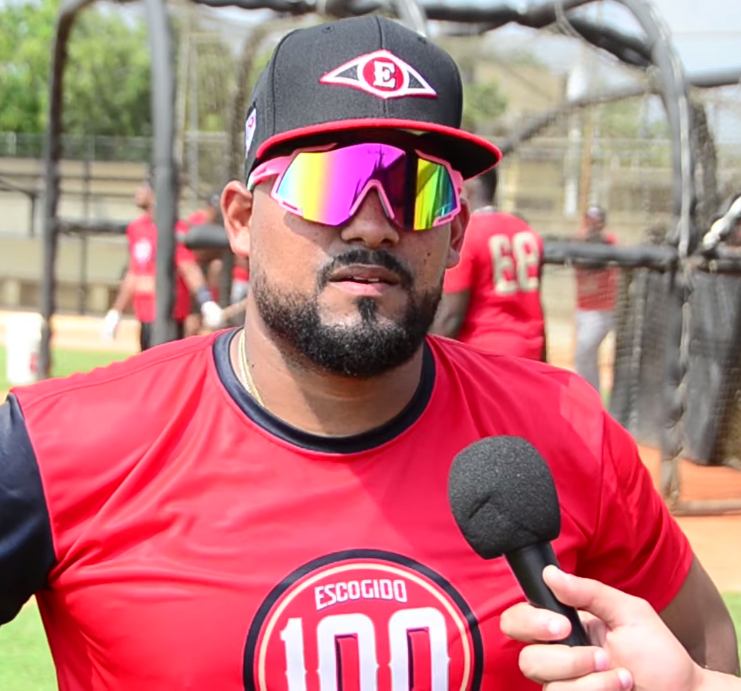
- Valerio with Leones del Escogido in 2021

Tampa Bay Rays – No. 96
- Catcher / Bullpen catcher
- Born: November 7, 1990 (age 35); Santiago, Dominican Republic
- Bats: Both Throws: Right
- Stats at Baseball Reference

Teams
- As coach: Tampa Bay Rays (2022–present)
Medals
Men's baseball
Representing Dominican Republic
Olympic Games
Bronze medal – third place	2020 Tokyo	Team

Charles Samuel Valerio (born November 7, 1990) is a Dominican former professional baseball catcher and current bullpen catcher for the Tampa Bay Rays of Major League Baseball. He signed with the Cleveland Indians as an international free agent in 2010 and played in the minor & independent leagues from 2010–2021. Valerio also played for the Dominican Republic national baseball team.

== Career ==
=== Cleveland Indians ===
On May 26, 2010, Valerio signed with the Cleveland Indians organization as an international free agent. He made his professional debut with the Dominican Summer League Indians. In 2011, Valerio played for the rookie-level AZL Indians, batting .272/.359/.422 with 5 home runs and 21 RBI. The following season, Valerio split the year between the Low-A Mahoning Valley Scrappers and the Single-A Lake County Captains, accumulating a .255/.331/.394 with 5 home runs and 35 RBI. In 2013, Valerio played for the High-A Carolina Mudcats, posting a .238/.305/.346 slash with 2 home runs and 26 RBI. For the 2014 season, Valerio split the season between Carolina and the Double-A Akron RubberDucks, batting a cumulative .250/.355/.325 with no home runs and 5 RBI before he was released by the Indians organization on July 23, 2014.

=== Fargo-Moorhead RedHawks ===
On March 27, 2015, Valerio signed with the Fargo-Moorhead RedHawks of the American Association of Independent Professional Baseball. In 65 games with the RedHawks, Valerio slashed .268/.336/.403 with 5 home runs and 26 RBI. On May 18, 2016, Valerio was released by the team.

=== Joplin Blasters ===
On May 25, 2016, Valerio signed with the Joplin Blasters of the American Association of Independent Professional Baseball. In 58 games for the Blasters, Valerio batted .297/.351/.457 with 6 home runs and 32 RBI.

=== Fargo-Moorhead RedHawks (second stint) ===
On July 30, 2016, Valerio was claimed off waivers by the Fargo-Moorhead RedHawks of the American Association of Independent Professional Baseball. He played in 26 games for the RedHawks, hitting .325/.411/.500 with 3 home runs and 15 RBI. He remained with the club after re-signing on February 10, 2017, and logged a .275/.343/.472 with 12 home runs and 47 RBI in 93 games. On February 6, 2018, Valerio returned to Fargo for a fourth season, and slashed .258/.306/.425 with 12 home runs and 46 RBI in 82 games.

=== Southern Maryland Blue Crabs ===
On December 11, 2018, Valerio was traded to the Southern Maryland Blue Crabs of the Atlantic League of Professional Baseball in exchange for two players to be named later. He appeared in 109 games for the Blue Crabs in 2019, hitting .262/.296/.416 with 11 home runs and 46 RBI.

=== San Diego Padres ===
On November 14, 2019, Valerio signed a minor league contract with the San Diego Padres organization. Valerio did not play in a game in 2020 due to the cancellation of the minor league season because of the COVID-19 pandemic. He was released by the Padres on May 28, 2020.

=== Sioux Falls Canaries ===
On February 11, 2021, Valerio signed with the Sioux Falls Canaries of the American Association of Independent Professional Baseball. On December 15, 2021, the Canaries re-signed Valerio for the 2022 season. He was released by the team before the start of the season on April 6, 2022, in order to fulfill his obligations with the Tampa Bay Rays.

== Post-playing career ==
On April 6, 2022, Valerio was hired as a bullpen catcher for the Tampa Bay Rays of Major League Baseball (MLB) for the 2022 season.

== International career ==
On July 8, 2021, Valerio was named to the Olympic roster for the Dominican Republic national baseball team for the 2020 Summer Olympics (contested in 2021).
