= Yefri Pérez =

Dominican baseball player (born 1991)

Senadores de Caracas – No. 41
- Shortstop
- Born: February 24, 1991 (age 35); Baní, Peravia, Dominican Republic
- Bats: Switch Throws: Right

MLB debut
- July 17, 2016, for the Miami Marlins

MLB statistics (through 2016)
- Batting average: .667
- Home runs: 0
- Runs batted in: 0
- Stats at Baseball Reference

Teams
- Miami Marlins (2016)
Medals
Men's baseball
Representing Dominican Republic
Olympic Games
Bronze medal – third place	2020 Tokyo	Team

Yefri Pérez Martínez (born February 24, 1991) is a Dominican professional baseball outfielder for the Senadores de Caracas of the Venezuelan Major League. He has previously played in Major League Baseball (MLB) for the Miami Marlins.

== Career ==
=== Miami Marlins ===
On December 13, 2008, Pérez signed with the Miami Marlins organization as an international as an international free agent. He made his professional debut for the Dominican Summer League Marlins in 2009, hitting .236 in 59 games.

In 2010, Pérez played for the rookie-level Gulf Coast League Marlins, hitting .290/.333/.312 in 30 games. In 2011, Pérez split the year between the GCL Marlins and the Low-A Jamestown Jammers, accumulating a .241/.266/.323 slash line with no home runs and 18 RBI. The following season, Pérez returned to Jamestown and hit .280/.325/.357 with 1 home run and 16 RBI. Pérez split the 2013 season between the Low-A Batavia Muckdogs, the Single-A Greensboro Grasshoppers, and the High-A Jupiter Hammerheads, slashing .229/.268/.340 with a career-high 3 home runs and 18 RBI in 48 games between the three teams. In 118 games for Greensboro in 2014, Pérez batted .287/.335/.335 with 1 home run and 29 RBI. In 2015, Pérez spent the season in Jupiter, logging a .240/.286/.269 slash line with 1 home run and 22 RBI in 135 games. He began the 2016 season with the Double-A Jacksonville Suns.

Pérez was selected to the 40-man roster and called up to the Major Leagues for the first time on July 3, 2016, as their 26th man for the Fort Bragg Game, but was optioned to the minors the next day without appearing in a game. He was called up a second time on July 15, and made his debut two days later as a pinch runner for Cole Gillespie, stealing a base and scoring against the St. Louis Cardinals. Pérez finished his rookie season 2-for-3 with 4 stolen bases in 12 major league appearances with Miami. He was assigned to Jacksonville to begin the 2017 season. Pérez was designated for assignment on May 12, 2017, to create roster space for Mike Avilés. On May 15, Pérez was sent outright to Double-A, and hit .169 in 76 games with the team. On November 6, he elected free agency.

=== Acereros de Monclova ===
On March 9, 2018, Pérez signed a minor league contract with the St. Louis Cardinals. He was released by the Cardinals organization on March 28.

On April 18, 2018, Pérez signed with the Acereros de Monclova of the Mexican League. In 50 games with Monclova, Pérez hit 4 home runs with 26 RBI and 16 stolen bases. He became a free agent following the 2018 season.

=== Pericos de Puebla ===
On July 12, 2019, Pérez signed with the Pericos de Puebla of the Mexican League. He was released on July 27, after hitting .298/.393/.511 in 12 games with the team.

=== High Point Rockers ===
On August 29, 2019, Pérez signed with the High Point Rockers of the Atlantic League of Professional Baseball. Pérez did not appear in a game for the team and became a free agent after the season. Pérez did not appear for a team in 2020 or 2021.

=== York Revolution ===
On February 22, 2022, Pérez signed with the York Revolution of the Atlantic League of Professional Baseball. Pérez appeared in 106 games for York in 2022, batting .276/.326/.415 with 7 home runs, 31 RBI, and 30 stolen bases.

=== Charleston Dirty Birds ===
On January 23, 2023, Pérez signed with the Charleston Dirty Birds of the Atlantic League of Professional Baseball. In 108 games, he hit .241/.296/.349 with seven home runs, 31 RBI, and 35 stolen bases. Pérez became a free agent following the 2023 season.

=== Bravos de León ===
On July 2, 2024, Pérez signed with the Bravos de León of the Mexican League. In 21 games for León, he batted .219/.241/.233 with no home runs, five RBI, and four stolen bases. Pérez was released by the Bravos on December 11.

=== Senadores de Caracas ===
In 2025, Pérez signed with the Senadores de Caracas of the Venezuelan Major League.
