= Fantino =

- Location within the Dominican Republic
- Coordinates: 19°7′12″N 70°18′0″W
- Country: Dominican Republic
- Province: Sánchez Ramírez
- Established: 1987

Area
  - Total: 95.97 km^{2} (37.05 sq mi)

Population
  - Total: 22,487
  - Density: 234.3/km^{2} (606.9/sq mi)

Fantino is a town in the Sánchez Ramírez province of the Dominican Republic.

== Sources ==
- World Gazeteer: Dominican Republic – World-Gazetteer.com
