= Johan Mieses =

Dominican baseball player (born 1995)

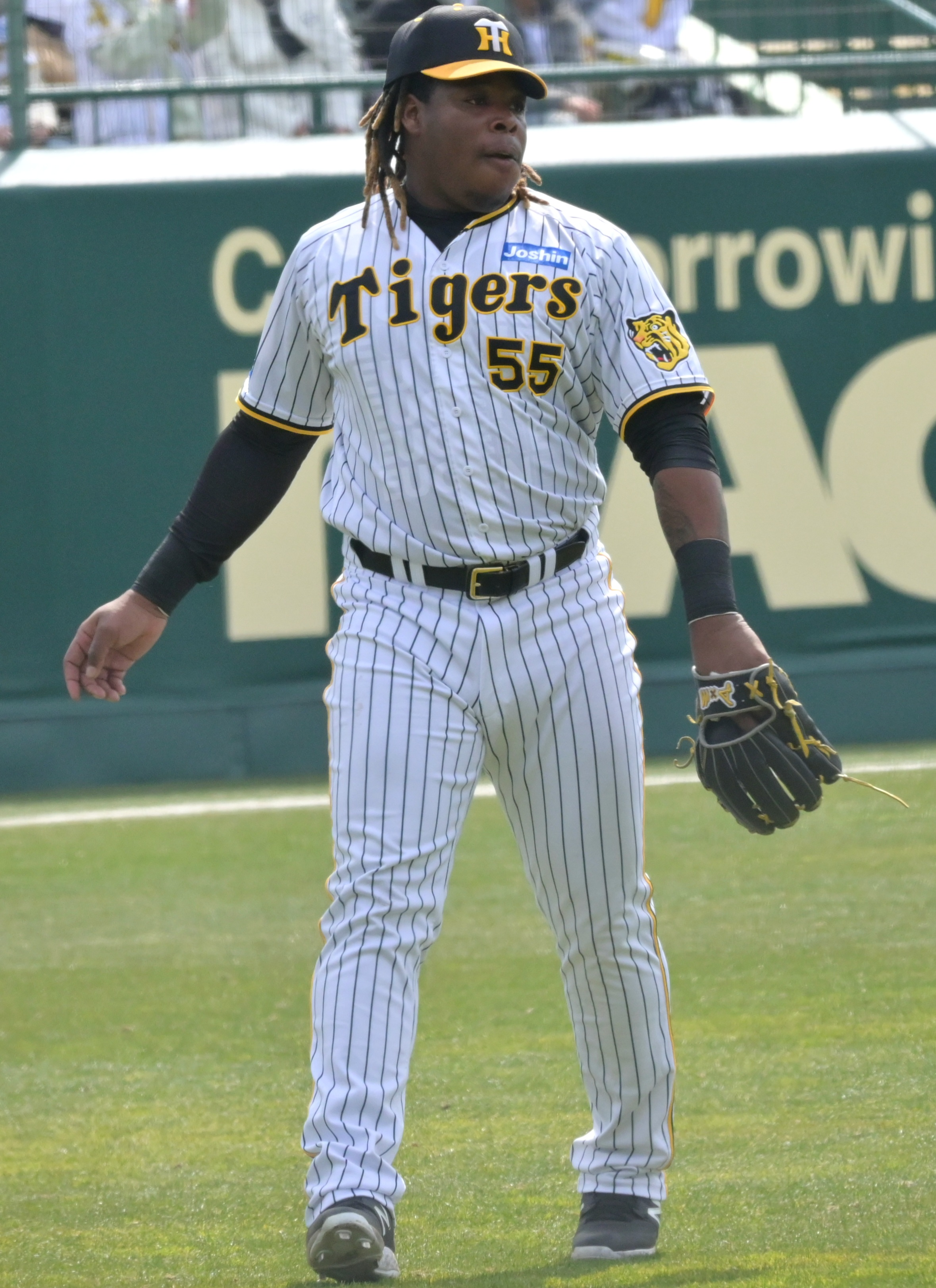
- Mieses with the Hanshin Tigers in 2023
- Outfielder
- Born: July 13, 1995 (age 31); Santo Domingo, Dominican Republic
- Batted: Right Threw: Right

NPB debut
- May 5, 2023, for the Hanshin Tigers

Last NPB appearance
- June 13, 2024, for the Hanshin Tigers

NPB statistics
- Batting average: .208
- Home runs: 5
- Runs batted in: 16

Teams
- Hanshin Tigers (2023–2024)

Career highlights and awards
- Japan Series champion (2023)
Medals
Men's baseball
Representing Dominican Republic
Olympic Games
Bronze medal – third place	2020 Tokyo	Team

Johan Mieses (born July 13, 1995) is a Dominican former professional baseball outfielder. He has previously played in Nippon Professional Baseball (NPB) for the Hanshin Tigers. He signed with the Los Angeles Dodgers as an international free agent in 2013.

== Career ==
=== Los Angeles Dodgers ===
On May 31, 2013, Mieses signed with the Los Angeles Dodgers organization as an international free agent. He made his professional debut with the Dominican Summer League Dodgers, hitting .222 in 16 games. In 2014, Mieses returned to the DSL Dodgers, batting .299/.371/.505 with 5 home runs and 24 RBI in 59 games. Mieses split the 2015 season between the Single-A Great Lakes Loons and the High-A Rancho Cucamonga Quakes, accumulating a .260/.309/.439 batting line with 11 home runs and 39 RBI. The following year, Mieses returned to Rancho Cucamonga and hit .247/.314/.510 with career-highs in home runs (28) and RBI (78). In 2017, Mieses split the season between Rancho Cucamonga and the Double-A Tulsa Drillers, posting a .215/.293/.449 slash line with 24 home runs and 63 RBI.

=== St. Louis Cardinals ===
On April 1, 2018, the Dodgers traded Mieses to the St. Louis Cardinals in exchange for Breyvic Valera. Mieses split the 2018 season between the High-A Palm Beach Cardinals and the Double-A Springfield Cardinals, posting a .229/.283/.400 slash line with 19 home runs and 71 RBI in 122 games. In 2019, Mieses split the year between the Triple-A Memphis Redbirds and Springfield, slashing .233/.319/.440 with 22 home runs and 66 RBI in 118 games. He elected free agency following the season on November 4, 2019.

=== Boston Red Sox ===
On November 13, 2019, Mieses signed a minor league contract with the Boston Red Sox organization. Mieses did not play in a game in 2020 due to the cancellation of the minor league season because of the COVID-19 pandemic. He was assigned to the Double-A Portland Sea Dogs to begin the 2021 season, and was promoted to the Triple-A Worcester Red Sox in June. Mieses elected free agency following the season, but was later re-signed to a minor league deal on January 4, 2022.

Mieses played in 60 games for Worcester in 2022, hitting .271/.387/.537 with 12 home runs, 35 RBI, and 5 stolen bases. He elected free agency following the season on November 10, 2022.

=== Hanshin Tigers ===
On December 15, 2022, Mieses signed with the Hanshin Tigers of Nippon Professional Baseball. Before he made his NPB debut, he briefly returned home in April 2023 after suffering a misfortune in his family. In 60 games, he batted .222/.301/.365 with five home runs and 16 RBI.

On November 23, 2023, Mieses re-signed with the Tigers. He played in 14 games for Hanshin in 2024, going 2-for-18 with 1 walk. On October 24, the Tigers granted Mieses free agency.

== International career ==
Mieses played for the Dominican Republic national team at the 2020 Summer Olympics, contested in Tokyo in 2021. He hit a game-tying home run in a win over Israel. He batted 3-for-16 in the tournament, hitting his second home run in as his team won the bronze medal game over South Korea.
