= Junior García =

Dominican baseball player (born 1995)

Free agent
- Pitcher
- Born: October 1, 1995 (age 29); Jima Abajo, Dominican Republic
- Bats: Left Throws: Left
Medals
Men's baseball
Representing Dominican Republic
Olympic Games
Bronze medal – third place	2020 Tokyo	Team

Junior García (born October 1, 1995) is a Dominican professional baseball pitcher who is a free agent. He was signed by the Houston Astros as an international free agent in 2012. García is listed at 5 feet 11 inches (1.80 m) and 220 pounds (100 kg) and bats and throws left handed.

== Career ==
=== Houston Astros ===
On October 17, 2012, García signed with the Houston Astros as an international free agent. He made his professional debut in 2013 with the Dominican Summer League Astros, recording a 2.67 ERA in 14 games. In 2014, García split the season between the rookie-level Gulf Coast League Astros and the Low-A Tri-City ValleyCats, posting a cumulative 2.89 ERA in 13 appearances between the two teams. He began the 2015 season with the rookie-level Greeneville Astros, and also played in 2 games for Tri-City.

=== Arizona Diamondbacks ===
On August 8, 2015, García was traded to the Arizona Diamondbacks in exchange for Oliver Perez. He finished the season with the rookie-level Missoula Osprey, logging a 2-2 record and 3.74 ERA in 5 starts.

In 2016, García split the season between the Low-A Hillsboro Hops and the Single-A Kane County Cougars, registering a 7-8 record and 4.53 ERA with 92 strikeouts in 119 1/3 innings of work between the two teams. The following year, García again split the year between Kane County and Hillsboro, pitching to a 4-3 record and 1.74 ERA in 24 appearances. For the 2018 season, García played in High-A with the Visalia Rawhide, posting a 2-3 record and 1.82 ERA in 24 appearances. He split the 2019 season between the Double-A Jackson Generals and Visalia, recording a 3-1 record and 2.53 ERA with 16 strikeouts in 32 innings of work.

García did not play in a game in 2020 due to the cancellation of the minor league season because of the COVID-19 pandemic. He was assigned to the Double-A Amarillo Sod Poodles to begin the 2021 season before receiving a promotion to the Triple-A Reno Aces in May. He finished the year with a cumulative 3.47 ERA with 38 strikeouts and 5 saves in 36 1/3 innings pitched.

García was assigned to Double-A Amarillo to begin the 2022 season. In 24 appearances for the team, he struggled to a 1-1 record and 7.86 ERA with 28 strikeouts and 4 saves in 26 1/3 innings pitched. He was released by the Diamondbacks organization on July 18, 2022.

== International career ==
García was named to the Dominican Republic national baseball team for the 2020 Summer Olympics (contested in 2021).
