= Jeison Guzmán =

Dominican baseball player (born 1998)

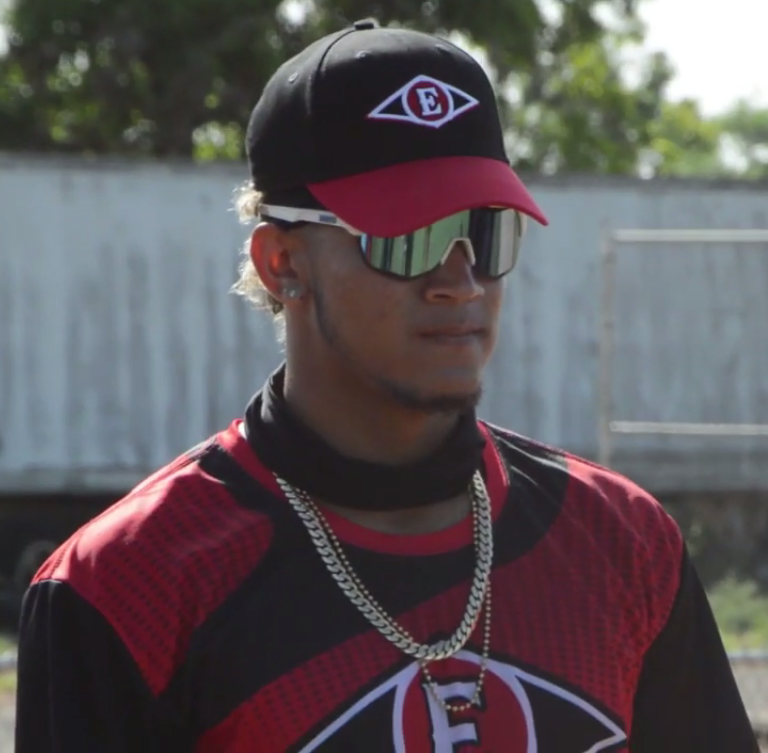
- Guzmán with Leones del Escogido in 2020

Free agent
- Shortstop
- Born: October 8, 1998 (age 27); Santo Domingo, Dominican Republic
- Bats: Left Throws: Right
Medals
Men's baseball
Representing Dominican Republic
Olympic Games
Bronze medal – third place	2020 Tokyo	Team

Jeison Guzmán (born October 8, 1998) is a Dominican professional baseball shortstop who is a free agent. He is a phantom ballplayer, having spent three days on the active roster of the 2020 Kansas City Royals without making an appearance.

== Career ==
=== Kansas City Royals ===
Guzmán signed with the Kansas City Royals as an international free agent on July 2, 2015, for a $1.5 million signing bonus. He split the 2016 season between the Dominican Summer League Royals and the rookie-level Arizona League Royals, hitting a combined .247/.314/.354 with one home run and 19 RBI. Guzmán spent the 2017 season with the rookie-level Burlington Royals, hitting .207/.286/.249 with no home runs and 15 RBI. He split the 2018 season between Burlington and the Single-A Lexington Legends, hitting a combined .254/.327/.356 with four home runs and 29 RBI. Guzmán returned to Lexington for the 2019 season, hitting .253/.296/.373 with 7 home runs and 48 RBI.

On November 20, 2019, the Royals added Guzmán to their 40-man roster to protect him from the Rule 5 draft. On August 11, 2020, he was promoted to the major leagues for the first time, but was optioned down on August 14 without making a Major League appearance. Guzmán did not play a game in 2020 due to the cancellation of the minor league season because of the COVID-19 pandemic. On December 2, Guzmán was non-tendered by the Royals and became a free agent.

On December 16, 2020, Guzmán re-signed with Kansas City on a minor league contract. Guzmán split the 2021 season between the Double-A Northwest Arkansas Naturals and the High-A Quad Cities River Bandits, slashing .255/.312/.401 with six home runs and 37 RBI in 66 games between the two affiliates. He elected free agency following the season on November 7.

=== Arizona Diamondbacks ===
On November 24, 2021, Guzmán signed a minor league contract with the Arizona Diamondbacks. He played in eight games for the Double-A Amarillo Sod Poodles, going 7-for-24 (.292) with one home run and one RBI. Guzmán was released by the Diamondbacks organization on June 5, 2022.

=== Kansas City Royals (second stint) ===
On August 10, 2022, Guzmán signed a minor league contract to return to the Kansas City Royals. He spent the remainder of the year with rookie-level Arizona Complex League Royals and Double-A Northwest Arkansas Naturals.

Guzmán remained in the Royals' system in 2023 with Northwest Arkansas and the ACL Royals, playing in 71 games and hitting .234/.344/.414 with 9 home runs, 43 RBI, and 4 stolen bases. He elected free agency following the season on November 6.

=== Staten Island FerryHawks ===
On March 20, 2024, Guzmán signed with the Staten Island FerryHawks of the Atlantic League of Professional Baseball. In 22 games for Staten Island, batted .241/.292/.446 with two home runs and 13 RBI. On May 22, Guzmán retired from professional baseball.

On May 2, 2026, Guzmán re-signed with the FerryHawks after a year of retirement. He made three appearances for the team, going 2-for-8 (.250) with one home run, one RBI, and four walks. Guzmán was released by the FerryHawks on June 9.
