= Cristopher Crisostomo =

Dominican baseball player (born 1994)

Cristopher Crisostomo C. C. Mercedes
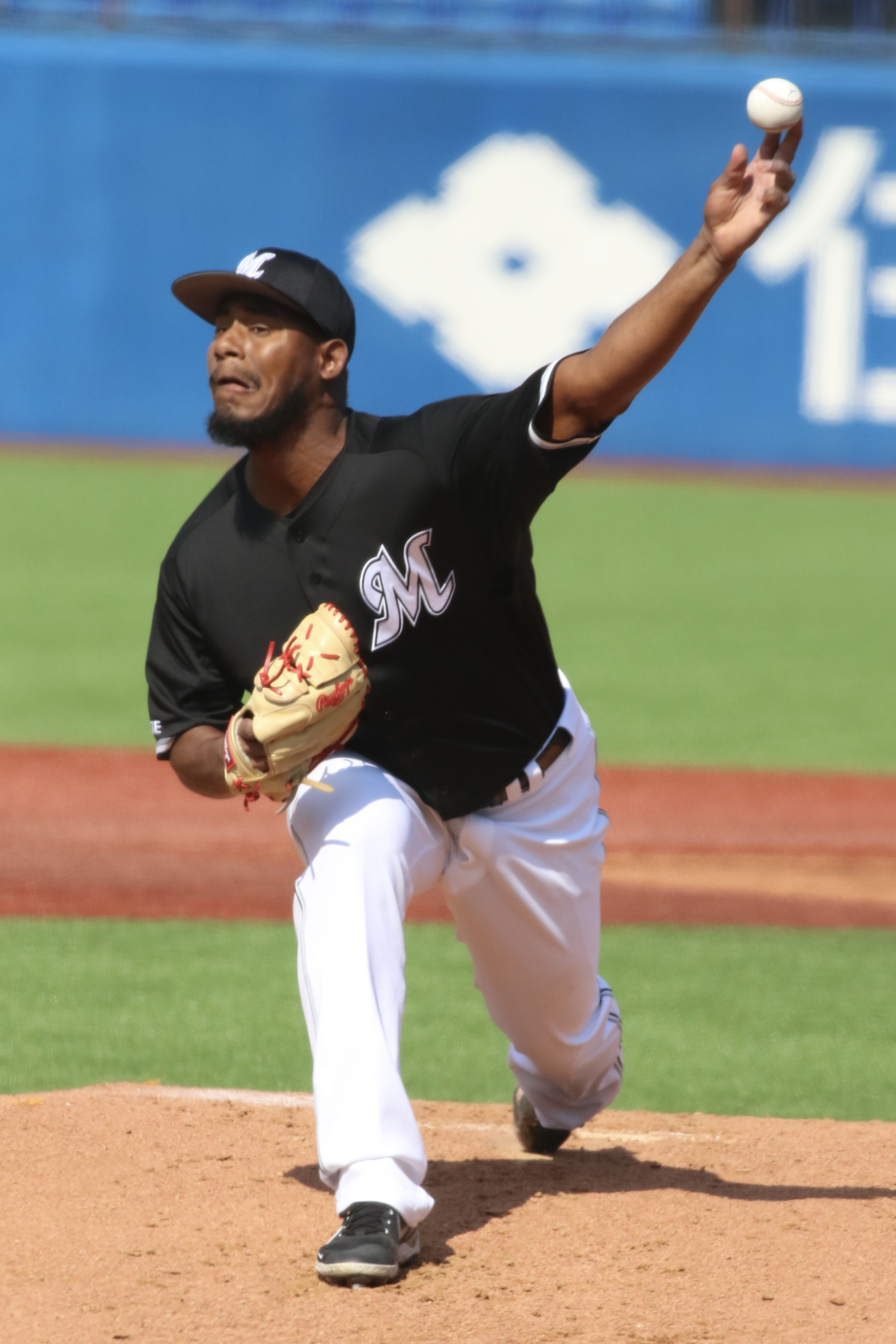
- C. C. Mercedes with the Chiba Lotte Marines

Wei Chuan Dragons – No. 95
- Pitcher
- Born: March 8, 1994 (age 32); La Romana, Dominican Republic
- Bats: Left Throws: Left

Professional debut
- NPB: July 10, 2018, for the Yomiuri Giants
- CPBL: March 30, 2025, for the Uni-President Lions
- KBO: August 9, 2025, for the Kiwoom Heroes

NPB statistics (through 2024 season)
- Win–loss record: 37–44
- Earned run average: 3.10
- Strikeouts: 484

CPBL statistics (through May 17, 2026)
- Win–loss record: 10–4
- Earned run average: 2.55
- Strikeouts: 82

KBO statistics (through 2025 season)
- Win–loss record: 3-3
- Earned run average: 4.47
- Strikeouts: 41
- Stats at Baseball Reference

Teams
- Yomiuri Giants (2017–2022); Chiba Lotte Marines (2023–2024); Uni-President Lions (2025); Kiwoom Heroes (2025); Wei Chuan Dragons (2026–present)

Career highlights and awards
- NPB All-Star (2024)
Medals
Men's baseball
Representing Dominican Republic
Olympic Games
Bronze medal – third place	2020 Tokyo	Team

Cristopher Crisostomo Mercedes (born March 8, 1994), also known as C. C. Mercedes, is a Dominican professional baseball pitcher for the Wei Chuan Dragons of the Chinese Professional Baseball League (CPBL). He has previously played in Nippon Professional Baseball (NPB) for the Yomiuri Giants and Chiba Lotte Marines, in the CPBL for the Uni-President Lions, and in the KBO League for the Kiwoom Heroes. He was signed by the Tampa Bay Rays as an international free agent in 2011. Crisostomo is listed at 6 feet 2 inches (1.88 m) and 180 pounds (82 kg) and throws left handed. He is a switch hitter.

== Career ==
=== Tampa Bay Rays ===
On July 2, 2011, Crisostomo signed with the Tampa Bay Rays organization as an international free agent. He made his professional debut with the Dominican Summer League Rays in 2012, posting a 1–3 record and 3.66 ERA in 14 games. He split the 2013 season between the DSL Rays and the rookie-level Gulf Coast League Rays, pitching to a cumulative 2–5 record and 3.83 ERA. He returned to the GCL Rays in 2014, pitching to a 1–2 record and 3.24 ERA with 11 strikeouts in 16.2 innings of work. For the 2015 season, Crisostomo played for the Low-A Hudson Valley Renegades, recording a 2.85 ERA in 18 appearances. On October 8, 2015, Crisostomo was released by the Rays organization.

=== Yomiuri Giants ===
On January 5, 2017, Crisostomo signed with the Yomiuri Giants of Nippon Professional Baseball (NPB) as a developmental squad player. Initially, he spent a year with the Hiroshima Toyo Carp's Dominican academies, before his contract was not renewed. He spent the year with the Giants’ farm and team, recording a 3.29 ERA in 18 games.

On July 8, 2018, Crisostomo was added to Yomiuri's main team roster. He made his NPB debut on July 10 as the starting pitcher against the Tokyo Yakult Swallows, and pitched 5.0 scoreless innings en route to the win. He finished his rookie season with a 5–4 record and 2.05 ERA in 13 games. For the 2019 season, Crisostomo pitched in 22 games for Yomiuri, logging an 8–8 record and 3.52 ERA with 107 strikeouts in 138.1 innings of work. In 2020, Crisostomo recorded a 4–4 record and 3.10 ERA in 11 appearances before his season ended after undergoing surgery to clean out his left elbow.

=== Chiba Lotte Marines ===
On December 14, 2022, the Chiba Lotte Marines signed Crisostomo. In 22 appearances during the 2023 campaign, he compiled a 4–8 record and 3.33 ERA with 58 strikeouts across 116 1/3 innings pitched.

Crisostomo made 21 appearances for Lotte in 2024, registering a 4–8 record and 2.71 ERA with 91 strikeouts over 126 1/3 innings of work.

=== Uni-President Lions ===
On January 6, 2025, Crisostomo signed with the Uni-President Lions of the Chinese Professional Baseball League. In 14 appearances for the Lions, Crisostomo compiled a 6–3 record and 2.57 ERA with 58 strikeouts over 84 innings of work.

=== Kiwoom Heroes ===
On July 26, 2025, Crisostomo signed with the Kiwoom Heroes of the KBO League. In eight starts for the Heroes, he logged a 3–3 record and 4.47 ERA with 41 strikeouts across 46 1/3 innings pitched. Crisostomo became a free agent following the season.

=== Wei Chuan Dragons ===
On December 29, 2025, Cristomo signed with the Wei Chuan Dragons of the Chinese Professional Baseball League. He pitched Games 2 and 4 of the 2026 Taiwan Series and was named the Taiwan Series MVP after the Dragons defeated the CTBC Brothers in six games.

== International career ==
On July 8, 2021, Crisostomo was named to the Olympic roster for the Dominican Republic national baseball team for the 2020 Summer Olympics (contested in 2021). He started for the team in their opening game against Japan, giving up 1 earned run over 6 innings in a no-decision.
