= Denyi Reyes =

Dominican baseball player (born 1996)

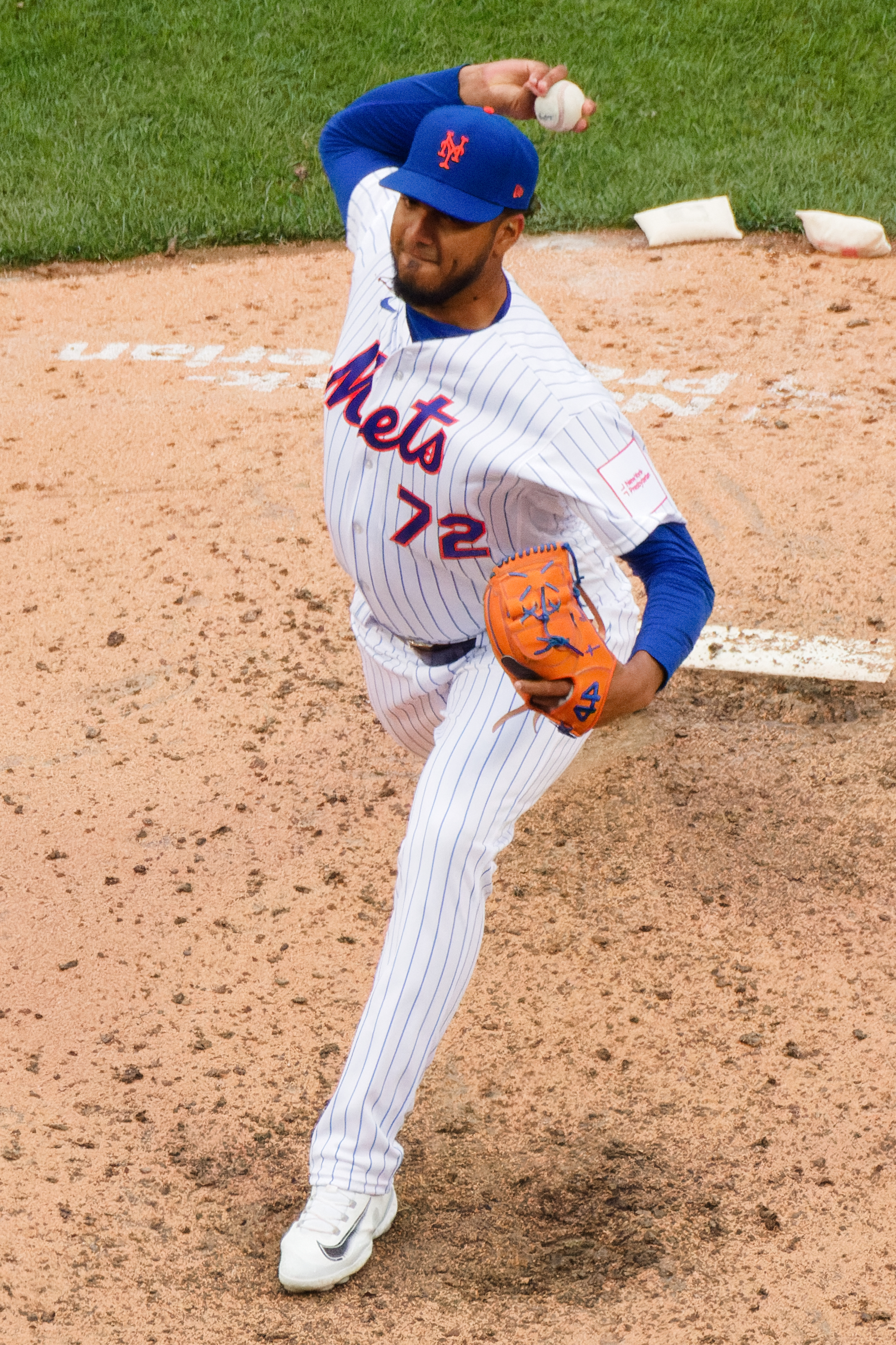
- Reyes with the Mets in 2023

Uni-President Lions – No. 88
- Pitcher
- Born: November 2, 1996 (age 29); San Cristóbal, Dominican Republic
- Bats: Right Throws: Right

Professional debut
- MLB: May 13, 2022, for the Baltimore Orioles
- KBO: March 24, 2024, for the Samsung Lions
- CPBL: April 22, 2026, for the Uni-President Lions

MLB statistics (through 2023 season)
- Win–loss record: 0–2
- Earned run average: 6.26
- Strikeouts: 20

KBO statistics (through 2025 season)
- Win–loss record: 15–7
- Earned run average: 3.90
- Strikeouts: 149

CPBL statistics (through May 20, 2026)
- Win–loss record: 2–2
- Earned run average: 2.40
- Strikeouts: 21
- Stats at Baseball Reference

Teams
- Baltimore Orioles (2022); New York Mets (2023); Samsung Lions (2024–2025); Uni-President Lions (2026–present)
Medals
Men's baseball
Representing Dominican Republic
Olympic Games
Bronze medal – third place	2020 Tokyo	Team

Denyi Reyes (born November 2, 1996) is a Dominican professional baseball pitcher for the Uni-President Lions of the Chinese Professional Baseball League (CPBL). He has previously played in Major League Baseball (MLB) for the Baltimore Orioles and New York Mets, and in the KBO League for the Samsung Lions. Listed at 6 feet 4 inches (1.93 m) and 209 pounds (95 kg), he bats and throws right-handed.

== Professional career ==
=== Boston Red Sox ===
Reyes signed with the Boston Red Sox as an international free agent on July 2, 2014. He made his professional debut in 2015 with the Dominican Summer League Red Sox, compiling a 7–1 record with 2.88 ERA in 15 games. In 2016, Reyes played for the rookie level Gulf Coast League Red Sox, appearing in nine games with a 4–1 record and 2.34 ERA. With the Low–A Lowell Spinners in 2017, he had a 9–0 record with 1.45 ERA in 15 games. In 2018, Reyes played for both the Single–A Greenville Drive and the High–A Salem Red Sox; in a total of 27 games (24 starts), he recorded a 1.97 ERA and a 12–5 record.

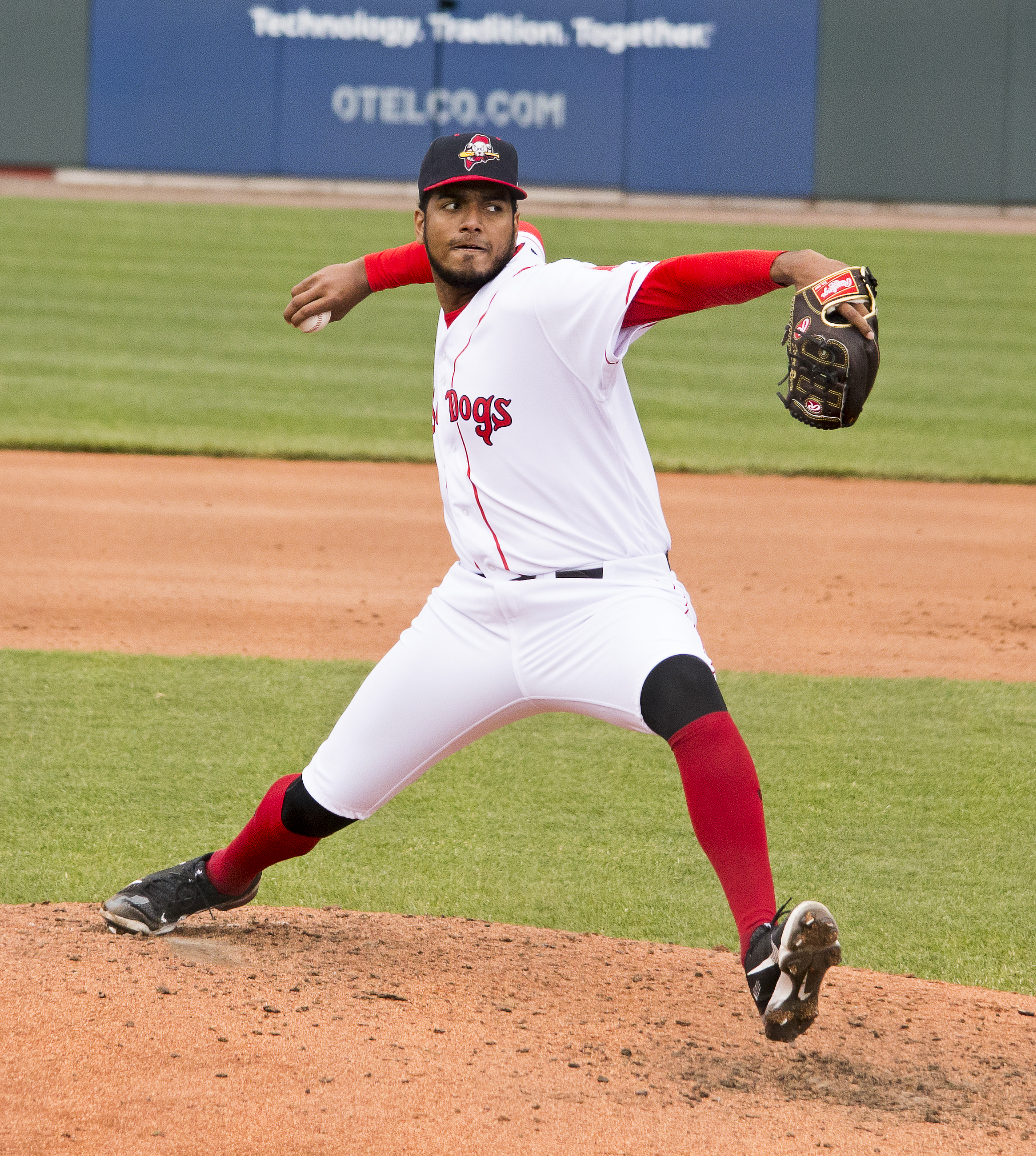
Reyes with the Portland Sea Dogs in 2021

On November 20, 2018, the Red Sox added Reyes to their 40-man roster to protect him from the Rule 5 draft. He spent the 2019 season with the Double-A Portland Sea Dogs, compiling an 8–12 record in 26 starts with 4.16 ERA and 116 strikeouts in 151 1/3 innings. On January 28, 2020, Reyes was designated for assignment by the Red Sox, to make room on the 40-man roster for Mitch Moreland. Reyes was sent outright to the Triple-A Pawtucket Red Sox on February 3. He was later announced as a non-roster invitee to Red Sox spring training, but did not play during 2020 due to cancellation of the minor league season because of the COVID-19 pandemic. Reyes spent the 2021 season in Double-A with Portland, making 20 appearances and posting a 4.21 ERA with 63 strikeouts in 57 2/3 innings pitched. He elected free agency following the season on November 7, 2021.

=== Baltimore Orioles ===
On November 29, 2021, Reyes signed a minor league deal with the Baltimore Orioles. He was assigned to the Triple-A Norfolk Tides to begin the 2022 season.

On May 12, 2022, Reyes was selected to the 40-man roster and promoted to the major leagues for the first time. In 3 games for Baltimore, Reyes recorded a 2.35 ERA with 3 strikeouts in 7.2 innings pitched. He was designated for assignment on August 31, following the promotion of Gunnar Henderson. He cleared waivers and was sent outright to Triple–A Norfolk on September 2. On October 14, Reyes elected to become a free agent.

=== New York Mets ===
On November 23, 2022, Reyes signed a minor league deal with the New York Mets that included an invite to spring training. On April 4, 2023, Reyes was selected to the active roster after Tommy Hunter was placed on the injured list. In 6 games, he registered a 6.14 ERA with 8 strikeouts in 7 1/3 innings of work. On July 4, Reyes was designated for assignment following the promotion of DJ Stewart. He cleared waivers and was sent outright to the Triple–A Syracuse Mets on July 9. On August 11, Reyes was selected back to the major league roster to make a spot start against the Atlanta Braves. In 9 total games for the Mets in 2023, he struggled to a 7.78 ERA with 17 strikeouts in 19 2/3 innings pitched. Following the season on November 2, Reyes was removed from the 40–man roster and sent outright to Triple–A Syracuse. He elected free agency on November 6.

=== Samsung Lions ===
On January 4, 2024, Reyes signed a one-year, $800,000 contract with the Samsung Lions of the KBO League. In 26 starts for Samsung, he compiled an 11–4 record and 3.81 ERA with 114 strikeouts across 144 innings pitched.

On November 25, 2024, Reyes re–signed with Samsung on a $1.2 million contract. In 10 starts for the Lions in 2025, he posted a 4–3 record and 4.14 ERA with 35 strikeouts over 50 innings of work. On June 18, 2025, Reyes was released by Samsung after suffering a stress reaction in his right foot.

=== Uni-President Lions ===
On January 26, 2026, Reyes signed with the Uni-President Lions of the Chinese Professional Baseball League.

== International career ==
Reyes was named to the Dominican Republic national baseball team for the 2020 Summer Olympics, contested in Tokyo in 2021.

== See also ==
- List of Major League Baseball players from the Dominican Republic
