= Roldani Baldwin =

Dominican baseball player (born 1996)

Long Island Ducks – No. 6
- Catcher
- Born: March 16, 1996 (age 30); Puerto Plata, Dominican Republic
- Bats: Right Throws: Right
Medals
Men's baseball
Representing Dominican Republic
Olympic Games
Bronze medal – third place	2020 Tokyo	Team

Roldani Baldwin (born March 16, 1996) is a Dominican professional baseball catcher for the Long Island Ducks of the Atlantic League of Professional Baseball. He signed with the Boston Red Sox as an international free agent in 2013 and played for their organization until 2022. He won the bronze medal with the Dominican Republic national baseball team in the 2020 Summer Olympics.

== Career ==
=== Boston Red Sox ===
On November 25, 2013, Baldwin signed with the Boston Red Sox organization as an international free agent. He made his professional debut with the Dominican Summer League Red Sox in 2014, hitting .269 in 65 games.

In 2015, Baldwin split the season between the rookie-level Gulf Coast League Red Sox and the Low-A Lowell Spinners, slashing .288/.359/.399 in 50 games between the two teams. The following season, Baldwin split the year between the Single-A Greenville Drive and Lowell, accumulating a .266/.305/.372 batting line with 4 home runs and 37 RBI. In 2017, Baldwin returned to Greenville, logging a .274/.310/.489 slash with career-highs in home runs (14) and RBI (66). For the 2018 season, Baldwin played for the High-A Salem Red Sox, slashing .233/.282/.371 with 7 home runs and 27 RBI. Baldwin only appeared in eight games between Lowell and the GCL Red Sox in 2019, missing much of the year with a broken ankle.

The Red Sox invited Baldwin to spring training in 2020, but he did not play in a game in 2020 due to the cancellation of the minor league season because of the COVID-19 pandemic. He was assigned to the Double-A Portland Sea Dogs to begin the 2021 season. Baldwin elected free agency following the season, but later re-signed with the Red Sox on a minor league deal on February 1, 2022. He played for the Triple-A Worcester Red Sox until he was released on August 5, 2022.

=== High Point Rockers ===
On August 16, 2022, Baldwin signed with the High Point Rockers of the Atlantic League of Professional Baseball. Baldwin played in 19 games for High Point, hitting .264/.308/.569 with 6 home runs and 19 RBI. He became a free agent following the season.

=== Staten Island FerryHawks ===
On April 19, 2023, Baldwin signed with the Staten Island FerryHawks of the Atlantic League of Professional Baseball. In 99 games for Staten Island, he batted .272/.320/.438 with 12 home runs and 46 RBI. Baldwin became a free agent following the 2023 season.

=== El Águila de Veracruz ===
On February 8, 2024, Baldwin signed with the El Águila de Veracruz of the Mexican League. In 15 games, he batted .188/.250/.271 with one home run and six RBI. Baldwin was released on May 24.

=== Staten Island FerryHawks (second stint) ===
On July 9, 2024, Baldwin signed with the Staten Island FerryHawks of the Atlantic League of Professional Baseball. In 25 games for the FerryHawks, Baldwin slashed .212/.287/.282 with one home run and eight RBI.

=== York Revolution ===
On September 1, 2024, Baldwin was traded to the York Revolution in exchange for a player to be named later. In 8 games for the Revolution, he batted .333/.323/.767 with four home runs and 10 RBI. With York, Baldwin won the Atlantic League championship. He became a free agent following the season.

=== Long Island Ducks ===
On May 13, 2025, Baldwin signed with the Long Island Ducks of the Atlantic League of Professional Baseball.

== International career ==
Baldwin was named to the Dominican Republic national baseball team for Baseball at the 2020 Summer Olympics, contested in Tokyo in 2021. The Dominican Republic took third place in the tournament, winning the bronze medal.
