= Ramón Rosso =

Dominican baseball player (born 1996)

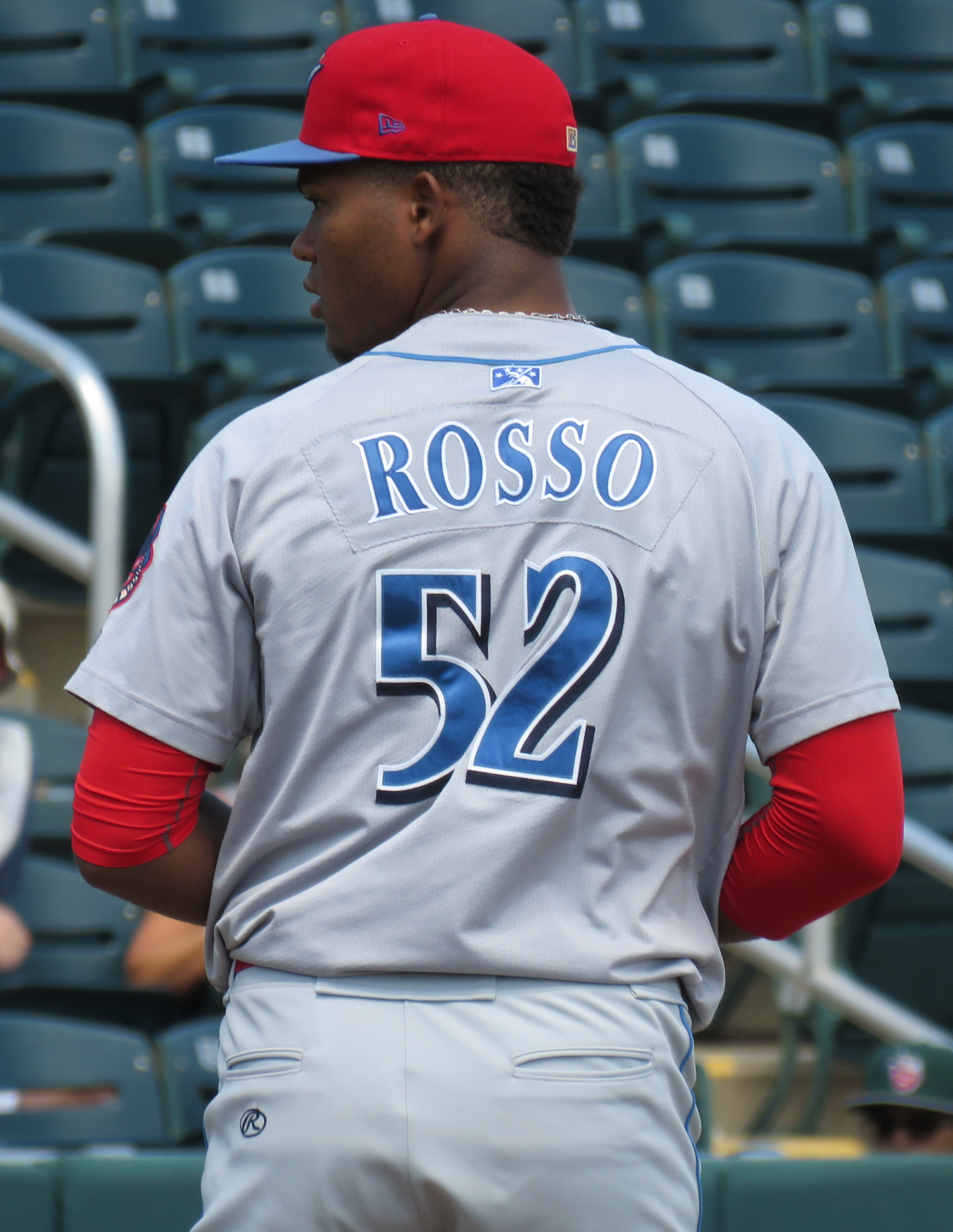
- Rosso with the Clearwater Threshers in 2018

Caciques de Distrito – No. 54
- Pitcher
- Born: June 9, 1996 (age 30); Santo Domingo, Dominican Republic
- Bats: Right Throws: Right

MLB debut
- July 24, 2020, for the Philadelphia Phillies

MLB statistics (through 2021 season)
- Win–loss record: 0–1
- Earned run average: 6.11
- Strikeouts: 18
- Stats at Baseball Reference

Teams
- Philadelphia Phillies (2020–2021)
Medals
Men's baseball
Representing Dominican Republic
Olympic Games
Bronze medal – third place	2020 Tokyo	Team

Ramón Antonio Rosso Mieses (born June 9, 1996) is a Dominican professional baseball pitcher for the Caciques de Distrito of the Venezuelan Major League. He has previously played in Major League Baseball (MLB) for the Philadelphia Phillies. Rosso made his MLB debut in 2020.

== Career ==
Rosso was born in Santo Domingo, Dominican Republic to a Spanish father and a Dominican mother. He moved to Spain, pitching for CB Barcelona of the División de Honor de Béisbol.

=== Los Angeles Dodgers ===
At 19, Rosso was signed by the Los Angeles Dodgers for a signing bonus of $62,000 on July 2, 2015. He was released by the Dodgers a year later on July 15, 2016, and never pitched in a minor league game for the organization.

=== Philadelphia Phillies ===
Rosso was signed by the Philadelphia Phillies, who had offered him a contract prior to his signing with the Dodgers, on June 2, 2017. He debuted for the Dominican Summer League Phillies, pitching to a 6–1 win–loss record with a 0.74 earned run average (ERA) in nine starts and earning a promotion to the Gulf Coast League Phillies. After striking out 13 batters with one earned run in nine innings pitched, Rosso was again promoted and finished the season with the Williamsport Crosscutters of the New York–Penn League. He posted a 1–0 record with a 3.00 ERA and 23 strikeouts in 18 innings pitched with Williamsport. Rosso began the 2018 season with the Lakewood BlueClaws of the South Atlantic League, where he went 5–1 with a 1.33 ERA and 81 strikeouts in 12 starts and was named a league All-Star before being promoted to the Clearwater Threshers of the Florida State League. He pitched in 11 games with 10 starts for Clearwater and went 6–2 with a 2.91 ERA.

Rosso began 2019 with the Reading Phillies of the Double-A Eastern League, where he had a 3–2 record with a 3.15 ERA in ten starts before earning a promotion to the Triple-A Lehigh Valley IronPigs. He finished the season with Lehigh Valley and went 2–4 with a 5.50 ERA and 64 strikeouts.

Rosso was invited to Spring Training by the Phillies in 2020. On July 24, 2020, Rosso made his MLB debut. He finished his rookie season with a 6.52 ERA in 7 appearances. Rosso pitched 1 1/3 scoreless innings for the Phillies in 2021 before being designated for assignment on May 23, 2021. He cleared waivers and was sent outright to Triple-A Lehigh Valley on May 28. On September 1, the Phillies selected Rosso's contract, adding him back to their active roster. On November 5, Rosso was removed from the 40-man roster and sent outright to Triple-A, but he rejected the assignment and elected free agency.

=== Detroit Tigers ===
On March 14, 2022, Rosso signed a minor league deal with the Detroit Tigers. He made only one appearance for the Triple–A Toledo Mud Hens, tossing a scoreless inning and recording one strikeout. Rosso was released by the Tigers organization on May 27.

=== Piratas de Campeche ===
On February 1, 2024, Rosso signed with the Piratas de Campeche of the Mexican League. In nine starts, he posted a 1–7 record with a 7.05 ERA and 33 strikeouts over 37 innings. On June 13, Rosso was released by Campeche.

=== Bravos de León ===
On June 20, 2024, Rosso signed with the Bravos de León of the Mexican League. He made one start, giving up 4 earned runs in 2 1/3 innings. On July 1, Rosso was released by León.

=== El Águila de Veracruz ===
On April 2, 2025, Rosso signed with El Águila de Veracruz of the Mexican League. In 15 appearances for Veracruz, Rosso struggled to a 7.43 ERA with 13 strikeouts and one save across 13 1/3 innings pitched.

=== Rieleros de Aguascalientes ===
On May 26, 2025, Rosso was traded to the Rieleros de Aguascalientes of the Mexican League. In 4 games (1 start) he threw 4.2 innings going 0–2 with a 13.50 ERA with more walks (6) than strikeouts (5).

=== Caciques de Distrito ===
On April 8, 2026, Rosso signed with the Caciques de Distrito of the Venezuelan Major League. In 11 games he threw 46.1 innings with a 6.99 ERA and 42 strikeouts.

== International career ==
Rosso has represented both the Dominican Republic and Spain in international competition.
