= Diego Goris =

Dominican baseball player (born 1990)

Free agent
- Infielder
- Born: November 8, 1990 (age 35); Santiago, Dominican Republic
- Bats: Right Throws: Right

Diego Agustin Goris (born November 8, 1990) is a Dominican professional baseball infielder who is a free agent. He signed with the Pittsburgh Pirates as an international free agent in 2008.

== Career ==
=== Pittsburgh Pirates ===
On May 23, 2008, Goris signed as an international free agent with the Pittsburgh Pirates. He made his professional debut with the Dominican Summer League Pirates. Goris returned to the team in 2009, batting .277/.313/.368 with one home run and 31 RBI. In 49 games for the team in 2010, Goris batted .310/.343/.450 with five home runs and 29 RBI. Goris returned to the DSL Pirates for a fourth season in 2011, slashing .350/.387/.511 with five home runs and 46 RBI in 68 games.

=== Kansas City Royals ===
On December 8, 2011, the Pirates traded Goris and Brooks Pounders to the Kansas City Royals in exchange for Yamaico Navarro. Goris spent the 2012 season split between the rookie–level Arizona League Royals and the rookie-level Idaho Falls Chukars, batting a cumulative .333/.348/.594 with career-highs in home runs (13) and RBI (51).

=== San Diego Padres ===
On December 6, 2012, the San Diego Padres selected Goris from Kansas City in the minor league phase of the Rule 5 draft. He spent the 2013 season with the Single–A Fort Wayne TinCaps, hitting .266 in 96 games with the team. The following year, Goris split the season between the High-A Lake Elsinore Storm and the Double–A San Antonio Missions, accumulating a .302/.323/.471 slash line with 17 home runs and 71 RBI in 126 games. In 2015, Goris split the year between the Triple–A El Paso Chihuahuas, San Antonio, and the rookie–level Arizona League Padres, batting a cumulative .257/.284/.358 in 105 games between the three teams. For the 2016 season, Goris played for El Paso and San Antonio, hitting .251/.286/.374 with nine home runs and 44 RBI. He elected free agency following the season in November 7, 2016.

On January 7, 2017, Goris re–signed with the Padres organization on a minor league contract. He spent the year in El Paso, playing in 125 games and recording a .285/.326/.417 slash line with 11 home runs and 56 RBI. On November 6, Goris elected free agency.

On January 16, 2018, Goris signed a minor league contract with the Chicago White Sox organization. On March 22, Goris was traded back to the Padres organization in exchange for future considerations. He played in 90 games with El Paso before he was suspended for 50 games for testing positive for a drug of abuse in August. On November 2, 2018, Goris elected free agency.

=== Guerreros de Oaxaca ===
On April 3, 2019, Goris signed with the Guerreros de Oaxaca of the Mexican League. Goris played in 54 games with Oaxaca, batting .252/.307/.440 with 9 home runs and 37 RBI before being released on June 20.

=== Charleston Dirty Birds ===
On March 10, 2022, Goris signed with the High Point Rockers of the Atlantic League of Professional Baseball. On May 16, Goris was traded to the Charleston Dirty Birds. Goris appeared in 81 games for Charleston in 2022, slashing .251/.288/.312 with two home runs, 30 RBI, and seven stolen bases.

On January 23, 2023, Goris re-signed with the Dirty Birds. In 89 appearances for the team, he batted .231/.271/.347 with seven home runs, 40 RBI, and 13 stolen bases.

=== High Point Rockers ===
On September 1, 2023, Goris was traded to the High Point Rockers of the Atlantic League of Professional Baseball. He made 15 appearances for the Rockers, hitting .298/.322/.316 with one RBI. Goris became a free agent following the season.

== International career ==
Goris has played for the Águilas Cibaeñas of the Dominican Winter League since the 2013–14 season, and represented them at the Caribbean Series.

Goris was named to the Dominican Republic national baseball team for the 2020 Summer Olympics. However, prior to the start of competition, Goris tested positive for marijuana. He was given a 3-month suspension and he was subsequently removed from the Olympic team roster.

== See also ==
- Rule 5 draft results
