= 1995 in baseball =

The following are the baseball events of the year 1995 throughout the world.

== Champions ==
=== Major League Baseball ===
- World Series: Atlanta Braves over Cleveland Indians (4-2); Tom Glavine, MVP

Division Series (ALDS, NLDS)
West	Seattle	3
WC	NY Yankees	2
American League
Central	Cleveland	3
East	Boston	0
East	Atlanta	3
WC	Colorado	1
National League
Central	Cincinnati	3
West	Los Angeles	0

League Championship Series (ALCS, NLCS)
West	Seattle	2
Central	Cleveland	4
East	Atlanta	4
Central	Cincinnati	0

World Series
AL	Cleveland	2
NL	Atlanta	4

- All-Star Game, July 11 at The Ballpark in Arlington: National League, 3-2; Jeff Conine, MVP

=== Other champions ===
- Caribbean World Series: Senadores de San Juan (Puerto Rico)
- College World Series: Cal State-Fullerton
- Cuban National Series: Villa Clara over Pinar del Río
- Japan Series: Yakult Swallows over Orix BlueWave (4-1)
- Korean Series: OB Bears over Lotte Giants
- Big League World Series: Tainan, Taiwan
- Junior League World Series: Lake Charles, Louisiana
- Little League World Series: Shan-Hua, Tainan, Taiwan
- Senior League World Series: Dunedin, Florida
- Pan American Games: Cuba over Nicaragua
- Taiwan Series: Uni-President Lions

== Awards and honors ==
- Baseball Hall of Fame
  - Richie Ashburn
  - Leon Day
  - William Hulbert
  - Mike Schmidt
  - Vic Willis
- Most Valuable Player
  - Mo Vaughn (AL) Boston Red Sox
  - Barry Larkin (NL) Cincinnati Reds
- Cy Young Award
  - Randy Johnson (AL) Seattle Mariners
  - Greg Maddux (NL) Atlanta Braves
- Rookie of the Year
  - Marty Cordova (AL) Minnesota Twins
  - Hideo Nomo (NL) Los Angeles Dodgers
- Manager of the Year Award
  - Lou Piniella (AL) Seattle Mariners
  - Don Baylor (NL) Colorado Rockies
- Woman Executive of the Year (major or minor league): Mary Cain, Portland Rockies, Northwest League
- Gold Glove Award
  - J. T. Snow (1B) California Angels (AL)
  - Roberto Alomar (2B) Toronto Blue Jays (AL)
  - Robin Ventura (3B) Chicago White Sox (AL)
  - Omar Vizquel (SS) Cleveland Indians (AL)
  - Ken Griffey Jr. (OF) Seattle Mariners (AL)
  - Kenny Lofton (OF) Cleveland Indians (AL)
  - Devon White (OF) Toronto Blue Jays (AL)
  - Iván Rodríguez (C) Texas Rangers (AL)
  - Mark Langston (P) California Angels (AL)
  - Mark Grace (1B) Chicago Cubs (NL)
  - Craig Biggio (2B) Houston Astros (NL)
  - Ken Caminiti (3B) San Diego Padres (NL)
  - Barry Larkin (SS) Cincinnati Reds (NL)
  - Steve Finley (OF) San Diego Padres (NL)
  - Marquis Grissom (OF) Atlanta Braves (NL)
  - Raúl Mondesí (OF) Los Angeles Dodgers (NL)
  - Charles Johnson (C) Florida Marlins (NL)
  - Greg Maddux (P) Atlanta Braves (NL)

== MLB statistical leaders ==
	American League		National League
Type	Name	Stat	Name	Stat
AVG	Edgar Martínez (SEA)	.356	Tony Gwynn (SD)	.368
HR	Albert Belle (CLE)	50	Dante Bichette (COL)	40
RBI	Albert Belle (CLE); Mo Vaughn (BOS)	126	Dante Bichette (COL)	128
Wins	Mike Mussina (BAL)	19	Greg Maddux (ATL)	19
ERA	Randy Johnson (SEA)	2.48	Greg Maddux (ATL)	1.63

== Major League Baseball final standings ==
Note: All teams played 144 games instead of the normal 162 as a consequence of the 1994–95 Major League Baseball strike. Seattle and California each played 145 games due to a one game AL West tiebreaker.

American League
Rank	Club	Wins	Losses	Win %	GB
East Division
1st	Boston Red Sox	86	58	.597	--
2nd	New York Yankees *	79	65	.549	7.0
3rd	Baltimore Orioles	71	73	.493	15.0
4th	Detroit Tigers	60	84	.417	26.0
5th	Toronto Blue Jays	56	88	.389	30.0
Central Division
1st	Cleveland Indians	100	44	.694	--
2nd	Kansas City Royals	70	74	.486	30.0
3rd	Chicago White Sox	68	76	.472	32.0
4th	Milwaukee Brewers	65	79	.451	35.0
5th	Minnesota Twins	56	88	.389	44.0
West Division
1st	Seattle Mariners	79	66	.545	--
2nd	California Angels	78	67	.538	1.0
3rd	Texas Rangers	74	70	.514	4.5
4th	Oakland Athletics	67	77	.465	11.5

National League
Rank	Club	Wins	Losses	Win %	GB
East Division
1st	Atlanta Braves	90	54	.625	--
2nd	New York Mets	69	75	.479	21.0
2nd	Philadelphia Phillies	69	75	.479	21.0
4th	Florida Marlins	67	76	.469	22.5
5th	Montreal Expos	66	78	.458	24.0
Central Division
1st	Cincinnati Reds	85	59	.590	--
2nd	Houston Astros	76	68	.528	9.0
3rd	Chicago Cubs	73	71	.507	12.0
4th	St. Louis Cardinals	62	81	.434	22.5
5th	Pittsburgh Pirates	58	86	.403	27.0
West Division
1st	Los Angeles Dodgers	78	66	.542	--
2nd	Colorado Rockies *	77	67	.535	1.0
3rd	San Diego Padres	70	74	.486	8.0
4th	San Francisco Giants	67	77	.465	11.0

- The asterisk denotes the club that won the wild card for its respective league.

== Managers ==
=== American League ===
Team	Manager	Comments
Baltimore Orioles	Phil Regan	
Boston Red Sox	Kevin Kennedy	
California Angels	Marcel Lachemann	
Chicago White Sox	Gene Lamont	Replaced during the season by Terry Bevington
Cleveland Indians	Mike Hargrove	Won the American League pennant
Detroit Tigers	Sparky Anderson	
Kansas City Royals	Bob Boone	
Milwaukee Brewers	Phil Garner	
Minnesota Twins	Tom Kelly	
New York Yankees	Buck Showalter	Replaced after the season by Joe Torre
Oakland Athletics	Tony La Russa	
Seattle Mariners	Lou Piniella	
Texas Rangers	Johnny Oates	
Toronto Blue Jays	Cito Gaston	

=== National League ===
Team	Manager	Comments
Atlanta Braves	Bobby Cox	Won the World Series
Chicago Cubs	Jim Riggleman	
Cincinnati Reds	Davey Johnson	
Colorado Rockies	Don Baylor	
Florida Marlins	Rene Lachemann	
Houston Astros	Terry Collins	
Los Angeles Dodgers	Tommy Lasorda	
Montreal Expos	Felipe Alou	
New York Mets	Dallas Green	
Philadelphia Phillies	Jim Fregosi	
Pittsburgh Pirates	Jim Leyland	
St. Louis Cardinals	Joe Torre	Replaced during the season by Mike Jorgensen
San Diego Padres	Bruce Bochy	
San Francisco Giants	Dusty Baker	

== Events ==
=== January–June ===
- March 9 – Major League Baseball goes ahead with choosing the cities for the 1998 expansion: Phoenix, Arizona, and St. Petersburg, Florida. Phoenix gets the National League Arizona Diamondbacks, and St. Petersburg gets the American League Tampa Bay Devil Rays. To keep the leagues even-numbered, the Milwaukee Brewers switch to the National League after the 1997 season, giving the NL 16 teams and the AL 14 teams.
- March 10 – Michael Jordan announces that he is leaving the Chicago White Sox organization and will return to the Chicago Bulls of the National Basketball Association.
- April 2 – After 232 days, the 1994–95 MLBPA Players Strike comes to an end when judge Sonia Sotomayor ends the strike.
- April 8 – The Colorado Rockies sign free agent outfielder Larry Walker.
- April 25 – Major League Baseball begins its strike-shortened 144-game season.
- April 26 – The Colorado Rockies open Coors Field with an 11-9 victory over the New York Mets in 14 innings.
- May 23 - Opposing pitchers Kevin Foster of the Chicago Cubs and Marvin Freeman of the Colorado Rockies each hit a home run off each other. Chicago defeated Colorado 7-6 in a game at Coors field in Colorado.
- May 26 – Ken Griffey Jr. of the Seattle Mariners fractures his left wrist while making a spectacular catch at the wall during the Mariners 8-3 victory over the Baltimore Orioles. Griffey would miss the next 73 games as a result of the injury.
- May 28 – The Chicago White Sox (5) and Detroit Tigers (7) combine for a record 12 home runs in one game at Tiger Stadium.
- June 3 – Pedro Martínez of the Montreal Expos pitches 9 perfect innings against the San Diego Padres before losing the perfect game on a 10th inning leadoff double by Bip Roberts as the Expos defeat the Padres 1-0 in 10 innings at Jack Murphy Stadium.
- June 30:
  - Eddie Murray of the Cleveland Indians gets his 3,000th career hit in a 3-1 Cleveland win over the Minnesota Twins at the Metrodome.
  - Mark McGwire hits a walk-off grand slam in the ninth inning off closer Lee Smith to give the Oakland Athletics an 8–5 victory over the California Angels.

=== July–September ===
- July 11 – The National League defeats the American League in the All-Star Game 3-2, on an 8th-inning pinch-hit home run by Jeff Conine. Conine becomes the 10th player to homer in his first All-Star at bat, and is named the Game's MVP. Frank Thomas, Craig Biggio and Mike Piazza also hit home runs.
- July 14 – At Dodger Stadium, Ramón Martínez of the Los Angeles Dodgers no-hits the Florida Marlins 7-0. On June 3 of this same season, Martínez' brother Pedro, pitching for the Montreal Expos against the San Diego Padres at Qualcomm Stadium, pitches nine perfect innings only to have his bid for a perfect game broken up by a Bip Roberts single leading off the 10th. Otherwise the Martinezes are not the second brother combo, after Bob and Ken Forsch, to pitch Major League no-hitters, and they do not become the first to do so in the same season.
- July 18 – Albert Belle of the Cleveland Indians becomes the second player to hit a walk-off grand slam against California Angels closer Lee Smith this season. Mark McGwire of the Oakland Athletics does that on June 30. The only other pitchers in major-league history to surrender two game-ending grand slams in one season are Satchel Paige (1952) and Lindy McDaniel (1963). New York Mets closer Francisco Rodríguez joins this group during the 2009 season.
- July 22 - A prerecorded message from Mickey Mantle is played over the Jumbotron at Yankee Stadium. The video is a part of the Yankees Old-Timers game celebration. It would be the last appearance of any kind from Mantle, as he dies 22 days later from Liver disease.
- July 30 – Mike Schmidt, Richie Ashburn, Vic Willis, William Hulbert and Leon Day are inducted into the National Baseball Hall of Fame in Cooperstown, New York.
- August 10 – The Los Angeles Dodgers are forced to forfeit to the visiting St. Louis Cardinals when inebriated fans react to several close calls by throwing souvenir baseballs onto the field.
- August 13 – New York Yankees Hall of Fame outfielder Mickey Mantle loses his battle with liver cancer and dies at the age of 63. He had undergone a liver transplant on June 8. One of his last public appearances was at a news conference on July 11 in Dallas, the same day that the MLB All-Star Game that year was held in nearby Arlington, Texas. His funeral is held 2 days later with Bob Costas delivering the eulogy.
- August 25 – The Philadelphia Phillies defeat the Los Angeles Dodgers 17-4 at Veterans Stadium. Hideo Nomo only pitches 3 innings. Jeff Juden hits a grand slam in the 4th inning. Gregg Jefferies hits for the cycle, the first Phillie to do so since Johnny Callison in 1963.
- August 29 – Against the Colorado Rockies at Three Rivers Stadium, Paul Wagner of the Pittsburgh Pirates has a no-hitter broken up by an Andrés Galarraga single with two out in the ninth. The hit is the only one Wagner allows in defeating the Rockies 4-0. The no-hitter would have been the first by a Pirate since John Candelaria in 1976.
- September 4 – Robin Ventura of the Chicago White Sox becomes the eighth player in major league history to hit two grand slams in a single game, doing so in the 4th and 5th innings of the White Sox 14-3 win over the Texas Rangers. The last to do it is Frank Robinson in 1970.
- September 6 – Cal Ripken Jr. of the Baltimore Orioles plays in his 2,131st consecutive major league game to surpass Lou Gehrig's 56-year record. When the game becomes official in the middle of the fifth inning, Ripken takes a victory lap around Camden Yards during the 22-minute standing ovation from the sellout crowd, including President Bill Clinton. In the game, Ripken goes 2-for-4, including a home run, in Baltimore's 4-2 win over California. It is baseball's most memorable moment in the 1990s.
- September 8 – The Cleveland Indians clinch the American League Central Division with a 3-2 win over the Baltimore Orioles. It is Cleveland's first postseason appearance since 1954, and ends the then-longest post-season drought in the Major Leagues.
- September 13 – Second baseman Lou Whitaker and shortstop Alan Trammell of the Detroit Tigers play in their 1,915th game together, setting an American League record.
- September 15 – The St. Louis Cardinals' shortstop Ozzie Smith is a part of his 1,554th double play to establish a new Major League record, despite the Cardinals losing to the Los Angeles Dodgers, 7-6.
- September 25 – In a 7-0 victory over the St. Louis Cardinals at Wrigley Field, Frank Castillo of the Chicago Cubs has a no-hitter broken up with two out in the ninth—by inches. Bernard Gilkey hits a line drive to right field and despite an all-out attempt by Sammy Sosa to make a diving catch, the ball falls in for a hit and eventually rolls to the wall for a triple, the Cardinals' lone hit of the game. The near no-hitter is almost the first by a Cub pitcher and the first one the Cubs are involved in, since Milt Pappas in 1972.
- September 28 – Greg A. Harris of the Montreal Expos becomes the first major league pitcher since 1893 to pitch with both hands in one game. Harris faces four batters, two from his usual right side and two from the left, in the ninth inning of a 9–7 loss to the Cincinnati Reds.
- September 30 – Albert Belle hits his 50th home run of the season, and becomes the first player in Major League history to collect 50 home runs and 50 doubles in a season.

=== October–December ===
- October 2 – In a one-game playoff the Seattle Mariners beat the California Angels 9–1 at Seattle after finishing tied atop the AL West.
- October 8 – After being down 2 games-to-zero in the best of 5 series to the New York Yankees, the Seattle Mariners complete a comeback, capped by the late inning heroics of Edgar Martínez, their designated hitter. Forever known as "the double" in Mariner lore, Martinez strokes a breaking ball into left field, scoring Joey Cora and Ken Griffey Jr. in the bottom of the 11th to erase a 1 run deficit and win the game and the series.
- October 23 – The St. Louis Cardinals hire Tony La Russa as their manager.
- October 28 – In a pitchers' duel, the Atlanta Braves win Game 6 of the World Series 1-0, on a combined one-hitter by Tom Glavine and Mark Wohlers. David Justice's sixth-inning home run accounts for the game's only run. In winning, the Braves become the first team to win World Championships representing three different cities – Boston (1914), Milwaukee (1957) and Atlanta. Catcher Tony Peña's leadoff single in the 6th is Cleveland's only hit. Glavine is named Series MVP.
- November 2 – The New York Yankees name Joe Torre as their new manager, replacing Buck Showalter.
- November 9 – Los Angeles Dodgers pitcher Hideo Nomo is named National League Rookie of the Year, becoming the first Japanese player ever to win a Major League award. Nomo posts a 13-6 record with 236 strikeouts and a 2.54 ERA in 191 1/3 innings of work.
- December 22:
  - Anheuser-Busch agrees to sell the St. Louis Cardinals for $150 million to an investment group that agrees to keep the team in St. Louis.
  - The Florida Marlins sign free agent pitcher Kevin Brown.
  - The Philadelphia Phillies sign free agent third baseman Todd Zeile.
  - The Boston Red Sox sign free agent pitcher Jamie Moyer.

== Movies ==
- Baseball Girls
- Hank Aaron: Chasing the Dream (TV)
- Past the Bleachers (TV)

== Births ==
=== January ===
- January 9 – Gabriel Moya
- January 11 – J. P. Crawford
- January 11 – Stephen Nogosek
- January 11 – Nick Solak
- January 13 – Jack Larsen
- January 13 – Andre Scrubb
- January 15 – Riley Smith
- January 17 – Randy Dobnak
- January 17 – Michael Hermosillo
- January 17 – Joe Jiménez
- January 17 – Yohander Méndez
- January 17 – Dom Nunez
- January 17 – Jhon Romero
- January 21 – Zach Plesac
- January 21 – Antonio Senzatela
- January 23 – Yairo Muñoz
- January 24 – Mark Contreras
- January 25 – Wyatt Mills
- January 27 – Matt Foster
- January 27 – Bryan Reynolds
- January 29 – Connor Brogdon

=== February ===
- February 2 – Yunior Marte
- February 3 – Anthony Bender
- February 3 – Andrew Knizner
- February 4 – Greg Weissert
- February 5 – Caleb Hamilton
- February 6 – Zack Collins
- February 6 – Riley O'Brien
- February 7 – Víctor Arano
- February 7 – Roberto Osuna
- February 8 – Jake Fishman
- February 9 – Bruce Zimmermann
- February 10 – Cal Quantrill
- February 11 – Gregory Soto
- February 12 – Parker Dunshee
- February 14 – Abiatal Avelino
- February 19 – Joel Kuhnel
- February 21 – C. D. Pelham
- February 21 – Kodi Whitley
- February 22 – Germán Márquez
- February 24 – Chance Sisco
- February 27 – Zach Muckenhirn
- February 28 – Randy Arozarena

=== March ===
- March 1 – Adbert Alzolay
- March 2 – Miguel Andújar
- March 2 – Reese McGuire
- March 3 – Zack Kelly
- March 6 – Eduardo Paredes
- March 7 – Nick Ciuffo
- March 7 – Jason Delay
- March 9 – Zack Burdi
- March 10 – Luis Castillo
- March 10 – Josh VanMeter
- March 11 – Joe Jacques
- March 13 – Nicky Lopez
- March 13 – Keegan Thompson
- March 16 – Rowdy Tellez
- March 21 – Anthony Kay
- March 21 – Chadwick Tromp
- March 22 – James Meeker
- March 23 – Isiah Kiner-Falefa
- March 24 – Nate Mondou
- March 28 – Will Smith
- March 31 – Brent Honeywell Jr.
- March 31 – Mason McCoy
- March 31 – David McKay

=== April ===
- April 1 – Keegan Akin
- April 3 – Jacob Nottingham
- April 4 – J. P. France
- April 4 – Conner Greene
- April 4 – Eduardo Jiménez
- April 6 – Bennett Sousa
- April 9 – Mac Sceroler
- April 11 – Cavan Biggio
- April 12 – Gabe Speier
- April 13 – Anthony Castro
- April 15 – Jesús Cruz
- April 15 – Danny Jansen
- April 17 – Kean Wong
- April 18 – Jake Rogers
- April 19 – Bryan Garcia
- April 19 – Chas McCormick
- April 19 – Matt Seelinger
- April 24 – J. C. Escarra
- April 25 – A. J. Puk
- April 26 – Nomar Mazara
- April 27 – Bryan Sammons
- April 28 – Brett Martin
- April 29 – Zach McKinstry
- April 30 – Jesús Tinoco

=== May ===
- May 1 – Lucas Erceg
- May 1 – José Urquidy
- May 3 – Elieser Hernández
- May 3 – Ronald Herrera
- May 3 – Austin Meadows
- May 4 – Akeem Bostick
- May 5 – Brian Serven
- May 6 – Yohan Ramírez
- May 6 – Matt Thaiss
- May 9 – Tommy Edman
- May 11 – Ryder Ryan
- May 13 – Julian Garcia
- May 16 – Freddy Fermín
- May 16 – Gabe Klobosits
- May 19 – Ronnie Dawson
- May 21 – José Alvarado
- May 25 – Jake Fraley
- May 25 – Michael King
- May 26 – Roel Ramírez
- May 27 – Yoan Moncada
- May 29 – Conner Menez
- May 29 – Zack Short
- May 30 – Christian Arroyo
- May 30 – Iván Castillo
- May 30 – Sterling Sharp
- May 31 – Gerson Bautista
- May 31 – Shane Bieber
- May 31 – Greg Deichmann

=== June ===
- June 1 – Jordan Sheffield
- June 2 – Peyton Gray
- June 2 – Mickey McDonald
- June 3 – Lake Bachar
- June 3 – Eric Lauer
- June 5 – Phoenix Sanders
- June 6 – Will Vest
- June 8 – Chad Smith
- June 10 – Patrick Murphy
- June 12 – Aaron Civale
- June 12 – Jeremy Walker
- June 15 – Dominic Smith
- June 16 – Ian Hamilton
- June 16 – Tyler Zuber
- June 18 – Jamie Westbrook
- June 19 – Cody Sedlock
- June 20 – Félix Bautista
- June 22 – Matthew Batten
- June 22 – Tyler O'Neill
- June 23 – Jorge Mateo
- June 25 – Franklyn Kilome
- June 27 – Jonah Heim
- June 29 – Bobby Dalbec
- June 29 – Nick Senzel
- June 30 – Irving Lopez

=== July ===
- July 1 – Ron Marinaccio
- July 3 – Trenton Brooks
- July 3 – Robert Dugger
- July 5 – Austin Hays
- July 7 – Richard Lovelady
- July 7 – Nathaniel Lowe
- July 7 – Franmil Reyes
- July 8 – Sam Long
- July 9 – Kenny Rosenberg
- July 9 – Jared Young
- July 10 – Phil Bickford
- July 11 – Daniel Johnson
- July 11 – Justin Steele
- July 12 – Narciso Crook
- July 12 – Bailey Ober
- July 12 – Logan Porter
- July 13 – Cody Bellinger
- July 13 – Alec Bettinger
- July 13 – Kyle Lewis
- July 14 – Isaac Mattson
- July 20 – Jake Walsh
- July 22 – José Siri
- July 25 – Darick Hall
- July 26 – Paul Campbell
- July 27 – Foster Griffin
- July 27 – Brad Keller
- July 27 – Adalberto Mondesí
- July 27 – Drew Rasmussen
- July 28 – Jorge Alcalá
- July 28 – Tylor Megill
- July 29 – Tyson Miller
- July 30 – Josh Palacios

=== August ===
- August 1 – T. J. Zeuch
- August 2 – Daulton Jefferies
- August 3 – Zac Gallen
- August 8 – Tomoya Mori
- August 10 – Monte Harrison
- August 10 – Allan Winans
- August 11 – Michael Chavis
- August 14 – TJ Friedl
- August 14 – Josh Maciejewski
- August 14 – Stephen Ridings
- August 17 – Blake Taylor
- August 18 – Yu Chang
- August 19 – Gerson Garabito
- August 20 – Brian Miller
- August 20 – Justin Williams
- August 21 – Ryan Dorow
- August 21 – Tyler Johnson
- August 22 – Shed Long
- August 23 – Bernardo Flores
- August 23 – Lane Thomas
- August 23 – Carlos Tocci
- August 24 – Brandon Wagner
- August 26 – Ranger Suárez
- August 29 – José Rodríguez
- August 30 – Sean Reid-Foley

=== September ===
- September 1 – Eduard Bazardo
- September 2 – Willy Adames
- September 3 – David Peterson
- September 4 – Mark Kolozsvary
- September 5 – Jason Martin
- September 6 – Shawn Dubin
- September 7 – Sandy Alcántara
- September 7 – Devin Smeltzer
- September 8 – Drew Carlton
- September 10 – Mike Baumann
- September 10 – Luis González
- September 11 – Domingo Leyba
- September 14 – Kazuto Taguchi
- September 18 – Vladimir Gutiérrez
- September 20 – Cory Abbott
- September 20 – Joe Dunand
- September 20 – Jon Kennedy
- September 22 – Justin Dunn
- September 22 – Calvin Faucher
- September 22 – James Karinchak
- September 22 – Luis Ortiz
- September 22 – Taisuke Yamaoka
- September 24 – Levi Jordan
- September 25 – Javy Guerra
- September 26 – Albert Abreu
- September 28 – Joe Barlow
- September 28 – Enoli Paredes

=== October ===
- October 1 – Charlie Barnes
- October 2 – Alex Lange
- October 2 – Kyle Wright
- October 5 – Zack Littell
- October 6 – Jake Bauers
- October 8 – Colin Holderman
- October 9 – Merandy González
- October 10 – Collin Snider
- October 10 – Nick Snyder
- October 10 – Nick Vespi
- October 11 – Mickey Gasper
- October 12 – Kirk McCarty
- October 13 – Andrew Wantz
- October 15 – Jack Flaherty
- October 16 – Jonathan Bermúdez
- October 17 – Ha-seong Kim
- October 18 – Osvaldo Bido
- October 24 – Nick Gordon
- October 27 – Bryce Johnson
- October 27 – Francisco Mejía
- October 30 – Yuki Matsui
- October 31 – Miles Mastrobuoni

=== November ===
- November 1 – Jason Foley
- November 2 – Rei Takahashi
- November 5 – Blake Weiman
- November 9 – José Quijada
- November 12 – Alex Faedo
- November 14 – J. J. Matijevic
- November 15 – Tanner Andrews
- November 15 – Luis Barrera
- November 16 – Victor González
- November 20 – Jeremy Beasley
- November 20 – David Fry
- November 20 – Amed Rosario
- November 20 – Forrest Wall
- November 22 – Stone Garrett
- November 22 – Parker Mushinski
- November 23 – Lewis Thorpe
- November 24 – Francis Martes
- November 25 – Trevor Stephan
- November 26 – Ryan Walker
- November 27 – Jared Oliva

=== December ===
- December 1 – Drew Ellis
- December 1 – Brandon Hughes
- December 4 – Jake Bird
- December 5 – Julián Fernández
- December 5 – Nick Nelson
- December 6 – Allen Córdoba
- December 10 – Tyler Cropley
- December 12 – DJ Peters
- December 12 – Nick Raquet
- December 18 – Luis Liberato
- December 18 – Brendan McKay
- December 23 – Dalton Guthrie
- December 25 – Enyel De Los Santos
- December 25 – Alex Jackson
- December 27 – Jonah Bride
- December 28 – Dylan Cease
- December 28 – Corbin Martin
- December 29 – Sean Guenther
- December 30 – Derek Hill
- December 31 – Yaramil Hiraldo

== Deaths ==
=== January ===
- January 2 – Don Elston, 65, two-time All-Star relief pitcher who played for the Chicago Cubs and Brooklyn Dodgers during nine seasons spanning 1953–1964, topping the National League with 69 relief appearances in 1958 and 65 in 1959 and leading all relievers with 127 innings pitched in 1960.
- January 3 – Ollie Bejma, 87, middle infielder and third baseman for the Chicago White Sox and St. Louis Browns in a span of four seasons between 1934 and 1939.
- January 3 – Bob Darnell, 64, pitcher who played for the Brooklyn Dodgers during the 1954 and 1956 seasons.
- January 3 – Mickey Haefner, 82, left-handed pitcher who played from 1943 through 1950 for the Washington Senators, Chicago White Sox and Boston Braves; one of four knuckleballers who were regular starting pitchers for 1945 Senators.
- January 3 – Jim Tyack, 83, outfielder for the 1943 Philadelphia Athletics.
- January 4 – Harry Gumbert, 85, pitcher who played with four clubs during 15 seasons from 1935–1950, going 11–3 in 1936 and winning 10 in 1937 for the New York Giants, helping them win back-to-back National League pennant winners, then going 9–5 to help the St. Louis Cardinals clinch the NL pennant in 1942 and 10-5 a year later, en route to the 1942 World Series which the Cardinals beat the New York Yankees, 4 games to 1.
- January 4 – Ralph Onis, 86, catcher for the 1935 Brooklyn Dodgers.
- January 7 – Kite Thomas, 71, outfielder who played from 1952 to 1953 for the Philadelphia Athletics and Washington Senators.
- January 12 – Hi Simmons, 89, head baseball coach at the University of Missouri from 1937 through 1973, guiding his team to the 1954 College World Series title.
- January 17 – John Hall, 71, pitcher for the 1948 Brooklyn Dodgers.
- January 18 – Ron Luciano, 57, American League umpire from 1968 to 1979, known for his flamboyance and as the author of humorous books on the life of an MLB arbiter; briefly a color man on Major League Baseball Game of the Week telecasts after his umpiring career.
- January 20 – Mark Filley, 82, pitcher for the 1934 Washington Senators.
- January 21 – Russ Bauers, 80, pitcher for the Pittsburgh Pirates, Chicago Cubs and St. Louis Browns over eight seasons between 1936 and 1950.
- January 23 – Saul Rogovin, 72, pitcher for the Detroit Tigers, Chicago White Sox, Baltimore Orioles and Philadelphia Phillies in a span of eight seasons from 1949 to 1957; led the American League with a 2.78 ERA in 1951.
- January 24 – Herb Karpel, 77, pitcher for the 1946 New York Yankees.
- January 26 – Dick Tettelbach, 65, outfielder who played from 1955 through 1957 for the New York Yankees and Washington Senators.
- January 30 – Buddy Gremp, 75, first baseman for the Boston Braves from 1940 to 1942.

=== February ===
- February 6 – Elmer Burkart, 78, pitcher who appeared in 16 games over four brief trials with the Philadelphia Phillies from 1936 to 1939.
- February 7 – Cecil Upshaw, 52, right-handed reliever who played for five teams during nine seasons from 1966 to 1975, saving 27 games for the Atlanta Braves in 1969, well known for his unorthodox but effective submarine delivery, as he tore up the ring finger on his pitching hand and had at least two surgeries and rehabbing.
- February 24 – Woody Williams, 82, second baseman for the Brooklyn Dodgers and Cincinnati Reds during four seasons spanning 1938 to 1945, appearing in 338 career games.
- February 28 – Wally Millies, 88, backup catcher for the Philadelphia Phillies, Washington Senators and Brooklyn Dodgers in a span of six seasons between 1934 and 1941; minor-league manager and longtime scout.

=== March ===
- March 2 – Ray Moore, 68, pitcher who played for the Brooklyn Dodgers, Baltimore Orioles, Chicago White Sox, Washington Senators and Minnesota Twins over 11 seasons from 1952 to 1963.
- March 5 – Roy Hughes, 84, middle infielder and third baseman for four teams over nine seasons from 1935 to 1946, who delivered 188 hits and scored 112 runs for the 1936 Cleveland Indians; starting shortstop for Chicago Cubs in six of seven games of 1945 World Series, batting .294.
- March 11 – Don Manno, 79, left fielder and third baseman for the Boston Bees and Braves from 1940 to 1941.
- March 13 – Leon Day, 78, seven-time All-Star pitcher for the Newark Eagles of the Negro leagues, who set several league strikeout marks, including 18 victims in one game, and was enshrined into the Baseball Hall of Fame just six days before his death.
- March 14 – Charlie Letchas, 79, backup infielder who played for the Philadelphia Phillies and Washington Senators in a span of four seasons from 1939 to 1946.
- March 17 – Muriel Kauffman, 78, philanthropist and civic leader who, with her husband, Ewing, founded the Kansas City Royals in 1968 and operated the team for over 25 years.
- March 17 – Jimmy Uchrinscko, 94, pitcher for the 1927 Washington Senators.
- March 27 – Chet Nichols Jr., 64, pitcher for the Boston/Milwaukee Braves, Boston Red Sox and Cincinnati Reds during nine seasons between 1951 and 1964, who posted 10 wins and led the National League with a 2.88 ERA in his rookie season.
- March 29 – Terry Moore, 82, four-time All-Star center fielder for the St. Louis Cardinals in 11 seasons from 1935 to 1948, who hit a .304 average in 1940, and captained the 1942 and 1946 World Series champion teams; manager of Philadelphia Phillies from July 15, 1954 to end of that campaign.

=== April ===
- April 7 – Frank Secory, 82, National League umpire from 1952 to 1970 who worked in four World Series, six All-Star Games and nine no-hitters; previously an outfielder for three MLB clubs between 1940 and 1946, well known for a pivotal hit in the 1945 World Series as a Chicago Cub.
- April 9 – Bob Allison, 60, All-Star outfielder for the Washington Senators and Minnesota Twins (1958–1970), who earned the 1959 American League Rookie of the Year award, had three 30-home run seasons, and led the league in triples and runs once each.
- April 10 – Billy Myers, 84, shortstop who played with the Cincinnati Reds from 1935 to 1940 and for the Chicago Cubs in 1941, being a member of the National League champion Reds in 1939 and 1940, and best remembered for his 1940 World Series-winning sacrifice fly in Game 7 against the Detroit Tigers.
- April 13 – Hal Peck, 77, right fielder who played from 1943 to 1949 for the Brooklyn Dodgers, Philadelphia Athletics and Cleveland Indians, and also was a member of the 1948 World Series champion Indians.
- April 18 – Elizabeth Emry, 72, All-American Girls Professional Baseball League pitcher for the 1946 Racine Belles champion team.
- April 19 – Jack Wilson, 83, pitcher who played from 1934 through 1942 with the Boston Red Sox, Philadelphia Athletics, Washington Senators and Detroit Tigers.
- April 23 – Howard Cosell, 77, flamboyant and controversial sportscaster whose many assignments included acting as color commentator for the World Series and League Championship Series for ABC Television during the 1970s.
- April 23 – Jake Daniel, 85, first baseman for the 1937 Brooklyn Dodgers.
- April 24 – John Campbell, 87, pitcher for the Washington Senators in the 1933 season.
- April 27 – Kent Peterson, 69, pitcher who played for the Cincinnati Reds and Philadelphia Phillies in all or part of eight seasons spanning 1944–1953.
- April 28 – Peaches Davis, 89, pitcher who played from 1936 to 1939 for the Cincinnati Reds.
- April 28 – Gustavo Polidor, 33, Venezuelan infielder for the California Angels, Milwaukee Brewers and Florida Marlins during seven seasons between 1985 and 1993.
- April 29 – Ray Prim, 88, pitcher for the Washington Senators, Philadelphia Phillies and Chicago Cubs in a span of six seasons from 1933 to 1946; one of many ballplayers whose career was interrupted during World War II, who posted a 13-8 record and led National League pitchers with a 2.40 ERA for the pennant winning Cubs in 1945.

=== May ===
- May 4 – Connie Wisniewski, 73, four-time All-American Girls Professional Baseball League All-Star pitcher and outfielder, who set several records in the circuit in a nine-year career from 1944 through 1952.
- May 7 – Gus Bell, 66, All-Star outfielder with four NL teams, mainly the Cincinnati Reds, in 15 seasons (1950–1964); had four 100-RBI seasons and led the National League in triples in 1951; patriarch of a Major League family that includes son Buddy and grandsons David and Mike.
- May 9 – Marguerite Jones, 77, Canadian pitcher who played for the Minneapolis Millerettes and Rockford Peaches of the All-American Girls Professional Baseball League.
- May 17 – George "Catfish" Metkovich, 74, outfielder and first baseman who played for the Boston Red Sox, Cleveland Indians, Chicago White Sox, Pittsburgh Pirates, Chicago Cubs and Milwaukee Braves in a span of ten seasons from 1943 to 1954.
- May 18 – Jack Kramer, 77, three-time All-Star pitcher, whose 17 victories and 2.49 earned run average helped lead the St. Louis Browns to their only World Series appearance in 1944; later, an 18-game-winner for 1948 Boston Red Sox.
- May 19 – Fred Frink, 83. outfielder for the 1934 Philadelphia Phillies.
- May 23 – Ab Wright, 89, outfielder who played with the Cleveland Indians in the 1935 season and for the Boston Braves in 1944.
- May 30 – Glenn Burke, 42, center fielder for the Los Angeles Dodgers and Oakland Athletics in four seasons from 1978 to 1979, who was the first player in Major League history to publicly acknowledge his homosexuality during his professional career.
- May 31 – Norm Brown, 76, pitcher who played for the Philadelphia Athletics in the 1943 and 1946 seasons.

=== June ===
- June 7 – Eddie Lake, 79, middle infielder and third baseman who played for the St. Louis Cardinals, Boston Red Sox and Detroit Tigers during eleven seasons spanning 1939–1950.
- June 9 – Zoilo Versalles, 55, Cuban two-time All-Star and two-time Gold Glove shortstop who led the Minnesota Twins to the 1965 American League pennant, as well as the first Latin American player to win the Most Valuable Player Award, while leading the league in triples three times and in doubles and runs once each.
- June 10 – Stan Andrews, 78, backup catcher who played for the Boston Bees, Brooklyn Dodgers and Philadelphia Phillies. in a span of four seasons from 1939 to 1945.
- June 10 – Lindsey Nelson, 76, broadcaster for the New York Mets from 1962 to 1979, and later for the San Francisco Giants and CBS Radio.
- June 17 – Bruce Campbell, 85, right fielder for five clubs during 13 seasons from 1930 to 1942, who returned from a bout with spinal meningitis in 1936 while playing for the Cleveland Indians, to get six hits in a nine-inning ball game and reach a .372 average in 172 at-bats, appearing also in all seven games of the 1940 World Series with the Detroit Tigers, posting a batting line of .360/.448/.520 with one home run and six RBI, while batting sixth in the line-up behind Charlie Gehringer, Hank Greenberg and Rudy York.

=== July ===
- July 4 – Adeline Kerrar, 70, All-American Girls Professional Baseball League catcher and infielder.
- July 4 – Al Unser, 82, backup catcher who played with the Detroit Tigers from 1942 to 1944 and for the Cincinnati Reds 1945; one of many ballplayers who only appeared in the major leagues during World War II; father of Del Unser and longtime scout.
- July 17 – Herb Hippauf, 56, relief pitcher for the 1966 Atlanta Braves who became a longtime scout.
- July 27 – Rick Ferrell, 89, Hall of Fame and eight-time All-Star catcher who played for the St. Louis Browns, Boston Red Sox and Washington Senators from 1929 to 1947, whose 1,806 career-games caught were an American League record until 1988; batterymate of his brother Wes Ferrell with the Red Sox from 1934 through 1938; later a coach for Washington and the Detroit Tigers, and a longtime Tiger front-office executive.

=== August ===
- August 1 – Ruby Knezovich, 77, Canadian catcher who played from 1943 to 1944 in the All-American Girls Professional Baseball League.
- August 3 – Harry Craft, 80, manager of the Houston Colt .45s in their 1962 debut, who also managed the Kansas City Athletics and Chicago Cubs, and previously was a Cincinnati Reds center fielder.
- August 4 – Dick Bartell, 87, All-Star shortstop for five teams, known for his combative personality, who batted .300 five times and scored 100 runs three times, while batting .381 for the New York Giants in the 1936 World Series.
- August 13 – Mickey Mantle, 63, Hall of Fame and 16-time All-Star center fielder, as well as a powerful switch-hitter for the New York Yankees, being a successor to Babe Ruth and Joe DiMaggio as symbol of the Yankees' long reign, who earned the American League MVP Award from 1956 to 1957 and in 1962, while setting a record with 18 home runs in World Series play, hitting .300 or more ten times, leading the AL in runs six times to set an all-time record, winning the 1956 Triple Crown, four home run titles –hitting 50 twice–, and retiring with the third most career HRs (536) and walks (1,733) in MLB history, including career marks for runs (1,677), RBI (1,509) and slugging percentage (.557).
- August 20 – Bill Kennedy, 76, pitcher who played for the Washington Senators in a span of three seasons from 1942 to 1947.
- August 20 – Von McDaniel, 56, pitcher who joined his elder brother Lindy on the 1957–1958 St. Louis Cardinals pitching staff, throwing a complete game, two-hit shutout for St. Louis in his debut against the defending National League champion Brooklyn Dodgers in 1957, winning his first four decisions, including 19 consecutive scoreless innings and a one-hitter; a breakdown in his pitching mechanics resulted in severe control problems that curtailed his promising pitching career, and caused him to eventually become a third baseman in the minor leagues.
- August 28 – Juan Rios, 53, Puerto Rican middle infielder who played for the Kansas City Royals in its 1969 inaugural season.

=== September ===
- September 7 – Al Papai, 78, knuckleballer specialist for four major league teams from 1948 to 1955, and one of 29 players to pitch for the St. Louis Browns and Cardinals clubs.
- September 15 – Napoleón Reyes, 75, Cuban corner infielder for the New York Giants in part of three seasons spanning 1943–1950, who tied a National League record for the most hit by pitches in a season, being hit on eight occasions in 1945, joining Hall of Famer Mel Ott and All-Star center outfielder Andy Pafko.
- September 19 – Mem Lovett, 83, who appeared as a pinch-hitter in a single game with the Chicago White Sox in the 1933 season.
- September 20 – Walter A. Haas Jr., 79, San Francisco business executive (Levi Strauss & Company) who owned the Oakland Athletics from August 1980 until his death.
- September 21 – Tony Cuccinello, 87, three-time All-Star second baseman and third baseman for five teams during 15 seasons spanning 1930–1945, who led National League second basemen in assists and double plays three times and hit .300 or better five times, with a career high .315 in 1931; hit .308 in 1945, losing the American League batting title in the last day of the season by .001 to Snuffy Stirnweiss; later, spent two decades as a third-base coach for four clubs, including the 1968 world champion Detroit Tigers.
- September 21 – Andrew Rozdilsky, 77, who performed as Andy the Clown at Chicago White Sox games from 1960 to 1990.

=== October ===
- October 3 – Nippy Jones, 70, backup first baseman for the St. Louis Cardinals, Philadelphia Phillies and Milwaukee Braves in eight seasons between 1946 and 1957, who made a token appearance as a pinch hitter in the 1946 World Series, won by the Cardinals, whose last time at bat in his undistinguished career earned him enduring fame in a memorable shoe-polish incident that helped the Braves win Game 4 of the 1957 World Series en route to the world championship.
- October 10 – Ed Gill, 100, pitcher for the 1919 Washington Senators.
- October 15 – Thelma Griffith Haynes, 82, who shared majority ownership of the Washington Senators/Minnesota Twins with her older brother, Calvin Griffith, from 1955 through 1984.
- October 16 – Joe Szekely, 70, right fielder who played with the Cincinnati Redlegs in its 1953 season.
- October 21 – Vada Pinson, 57, three-time All-Star and Gold Glove center fielder, who spent his 18-year career with five clubs from 1958 through 1975, most prominently with the Cincinnati Reds, leading the National League in hits, doubles and triples twice each, including four 200-hit seasons, while ending his career with 2,757 hits, 256 home runs and 305 stolen bases.
- October 26 – Lyman Linde, 75, pitcher for the Cleveland Indians during two seasons from 1947 to 1948.
- October 29 – Al Niemiec, 84, second baseman who played with the Boston Red Sox in the 1934 season and for the Philadelphia Athletics in 1936.
- October 31 – Jim Campbell, 71, longtime Detroit Tigers executive; as farm system director (1957–1962), general manager (1962–1983) and club president (1983–1992) he played a major role in Tigers' 1968 and 1984 World Series championships.

=== November ===
- November 2 – Sal Gliatto, 93, pitcher for the 1930 Cleveland Indians.
- November 19 – Ed Wright, 76, pitcher for the Boston Braves and Philadelphia Athletics between 1945 and 1952, who also threw a no-hitter in the American Association in 1945 and hurled the first shutout in Caribbean Series history in 1949.
- November 22 – Art Smith, 89, pitcher who played for the Chicago White Sox in 1932.
- November 23 – Lee Rogers, 82, pitcher who played for the Boston Red Sox and Brooklyn Dodgers during the 1938 season.
- November 24 – Irene Hickson, 80, All-Star catcher who played in the All-American Girls Professional Baseball League in a span of nine seasons from 1943 to 1950, winning the batting title in 1943 and being a member of two championship teams in 1943 and 1946.
- November 30 – Jim Davis, 69, pitcher for the Chicago Cubs, St. Louis Cardinals and New York Giants from 1954 to 1957, who in 1956 became the first pitcher in 40 years to record four strikeouts in a single inning.
- November 30 – William Suero, 29, Dominican Republic infielder for the Milwaukee Brewers from 1992 to 1993.

=== December ===
- December 2 – Art Herring, 89, pitcher who played for the Detroit Tigers, Brooklyn Dodgers, Chicago White Sox and Pittsburgh Pirates during eleven seasons spanning 1929–1947.
- December 5 – Bill Bruton, 70, speedy center fielder for the Milwaukee Braves and Detroit Tigers over 12 seasons from 1953 to 1964; led the National League in stolen bases three times, triples twice and runs once; a member of Braves teams that won two NL pennants (1957–1958) and the 1957 World Series; tied an MLB record with two bases-loaded triples in one game (August 2, 1959).
- December 11 – Woody Wheaton, 81, two-way outfielder / pitcher for the Philadelphia Athletics in two seasons from 1943 to 1944.
- December 12 – Mike Modak, 73, pitcher for the 1945 Cincinnati Reds.
- December 15 – Paul Pryor, 68, National League umpire (1961 to 1981) who worked three World Series, three All-Star games, and 3,094 NL tilts.
- December 17 – George Cox, 91, pitcher who played for the Chicago White Sox in 1928.
- December 20 – Betty Wanless, 67, All-American Girls Professional Baseball League infielder.
- December 27 – Al Barlick, 80, Hall of Fame umpire for 28 National League seasons between 1940 and 1971, who officiated seven World Series and an MLB record seven All-Star Games.
- December 26 – Bob Veselic, 40, relief pitcher for the Minnesota Twins in the 1980 and 1981 seasons.
- December 27 – Oscar Judd, 87, left-handed pitcher who played from 1941 through 1948 for the Boston Red Sox and Philadelphia Phillies; American League All-Star (1943); member of the Canadian Baseball Hall of Fame.
