= Shunsuke Kasaya =

Japanese baseball player (born 1997)

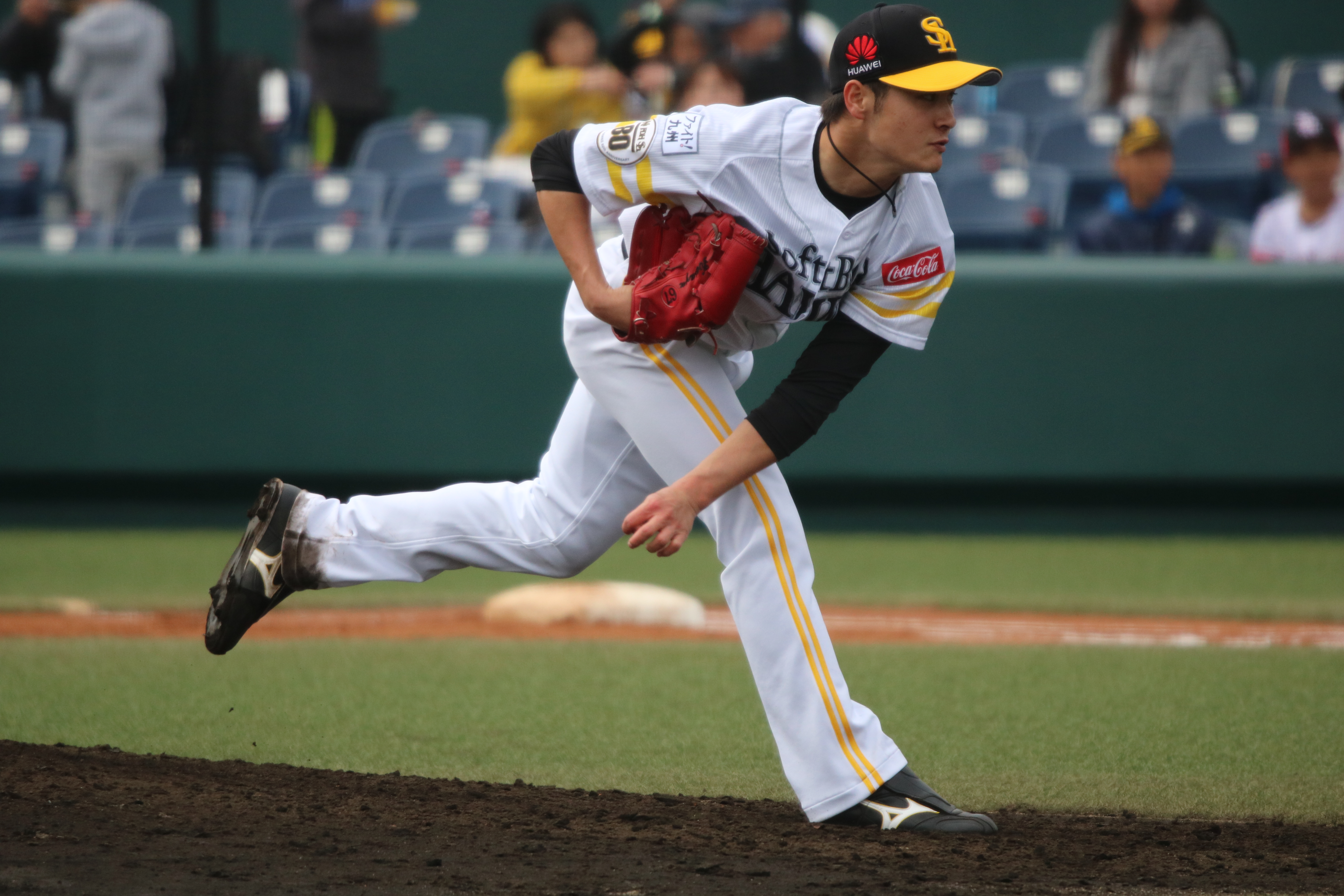
- Kasaya with the Fukuoka SoftBank Hawks

Yokohama DeNA BayStars – No. 199
- Pitcher
- Born: March 17, 1997 (age 29); Ōita, Ōita, Japan
- Bats: Left Throws: Left

NPB debut
- August 23, 2017, for the Fukuoka SoftBank Hawks

NPB statistics (through 2023 season)
- Win–loss record: 7-9
- ERA: 3.93
- Holds: 1
- Saves: 0
- Strikeouts: 172
- Stats at Baseball Reference

Teams
- Fukuoka SoftBank Hawks (2015–2024)

Career highlights and awards
- 2× Japan Series champion (2017, 2020)

Shunsuke Kasaya (笠谷 俊介, Kasaya Shunsuke; born March 17, 1997 in Ōita, Ōita Prefecture) is a Japanese professional baseball pitcher for the Yokohama DeNA BayStars of Nippon Professional Baseball (NPB).

== Early baseball career ==
Kasaya participated in the 2nd grade summer 95th Japanese High School Baseball Championship as an ace pitcher at the Ōita Prefectural Ōita Commercial High School with Hikaru Kawase and Masato Morishita.

== Professional career ==
On October 23, 2014, Kasaya was drafted by the Fukuoka Softbank Hawks in the 2014 Nippon Professional Baseball draft.

In 2015 season, he played in the Western League of NPB's minor leagues and played in informal matches against Shikoku Island League Plus's teams.

He spent the 2016 season on left elbow rehabilitation.

On August 23, 2017, he debuted in the Pacific League against the Saitama Seibu Lions. he was selected as the Japan Series roster in the 2017 Japan Series.

From 2017 season to 2019 season, he recorded with a 14 Games pitched, a 0–1 Win–loss record, a 5.63 ERA, a one Holds, a 16 strikeouts in 16 innings.

On July 17, 2020, Kasaya pitched in relief against the Orix Buffaloes and became his first Winning pitcher. And he became the winning pitcher on August 27 as the starting pitcher. In 2020 season, Kasaya recorded with a 20 Games pitched, a 4–4 Win–loss record, a 2.84 ERA, a 67 strikeouts in 57 innings. In the 2020 Japan Series against the Yomiuri Giants, he was selected as the Japan Series roster.

In 2021 season, Kasaya pitched a good game against the Orix Buffaloes on March 30 as a starting pitcher, allowing one run in six innings, but after that his pitching continued to suffer and he was reassigned to relief pitching in May 4. However, because he pitched well as a relief pitcher, he was used as a starting pitcher at the end of the season and finished the season with 16Games pitched, a 3-4 record, a 4.27 earned run average, and 67 strikeouts in 59 innings pitched.

In 2022 season, he finished the regular season with a 16 Games pitched, a 0–0 Win–loss record, a 6.35 ERA, and a 14 strikeouts in 17 innings.

In 2023 season, Kasaya developed inflammation in his left elbow in May and spent a month in rehabilitation. As a result, he only pitched in eight games, but posted an ERA of 1.59.
