= Ryoji Kuribayashi =

Japanese baseball player (born 1996)

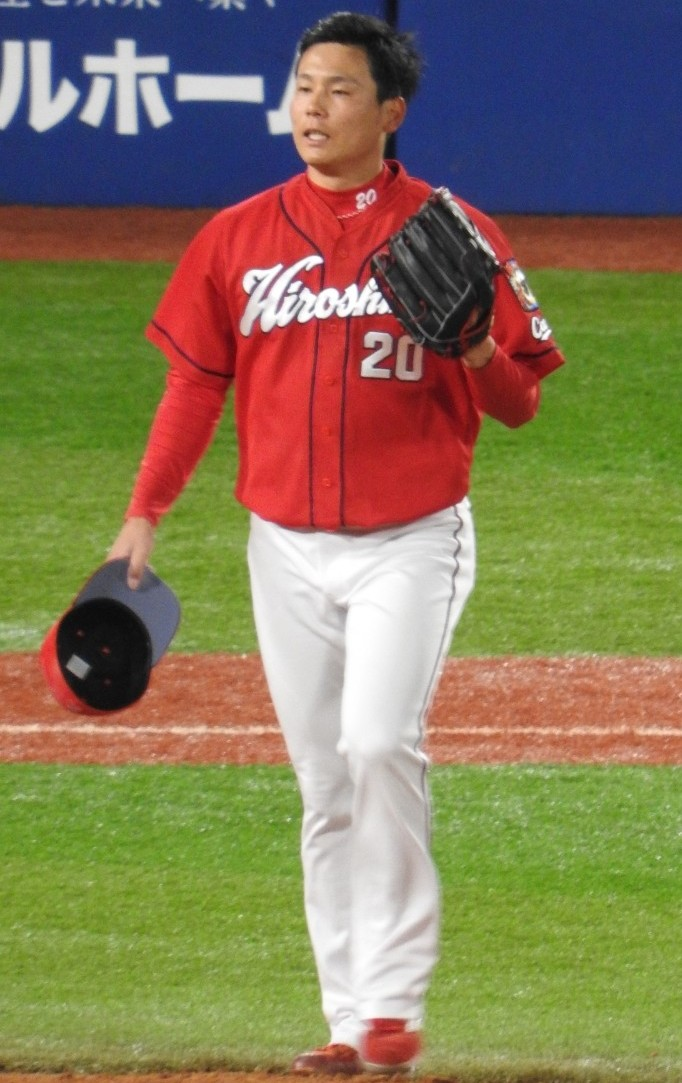
- Kuribayashi in 2021

Hiroshima Toyo Carp – No. 20
- Pitcher
- Born: July 9, 1996 (age 30); Aisai, Aichi, Japan
- Bats: Right Throws: Right

NPB debut
- March 27, 2021, for the Hiroshima Toyo Carp

Career statistics (through July 19, 2026)
- Win–loss record: 8–20
- Earned run average: 1.78
- Strikeouts: 355
- Saves: 134
- Stats at Baseball Reference

Teams
- Hiroshima Toyo Carp (2021–present)

Career highlights and awards
- Central League Rookie of the Year (2021); 3× NPB All-Star (2021, 2022, 2024)
Medals
Men's baseball
Representing Japan
Summer Olympics
Gold medal – first place	2020 Tokyo	Team
World Baseball Classic
Gold medal – first place	2023 Miami	Team

Ryoji Kuribayashi (栗林 良吏, Kuribayashi Ryōji; born July 9, 1996 in Aisai, Aichi, Japan) is a Japanese professional baseball pitcher for the Hiroshima Toyo Carp of Nippon Professional Baseball (NPB).

== Professional career ==
Kuribayashi was selected by the Hiroshima Toyo Carp with the team's first selection in the 2020 Nippon Professional Baseball draft. He made his NPB debut on March 27, 2021, pitching a scoreless inning with 2 strikeouts against the Chunichi Dragons. After recording a stellar 0.55 ERA in 33 appearances to begin the year, Kuribayashi was named an NPB All-Star for the first time in his career. In 2021, Kuribayashi recorded 37 saves with a 0.86 ERA in 53 games and claimed the Central League's Rookie of the Year Award.

In 2022, Kuribayashi pitched as a closer throughout the season and recorded 31 saves with a 1.49 ERA in 48 games.

On June 6, 2023, Kuribayashi pitched a scoreless seventh inning against the Hokkaido Nippon-Ham Fighters, earning his first win in NPB.

== International career ==
Kuribayashi represented the Japan national baseball team in the 2020 Summer Olympics in Tokyo. He pitched in five games and recorded 2 wins and 3 saves, contributing to Japan's gold medal in the Olympics.
