= Anthony Carter (baseball) =

American baseball player (born 1986)

- Pitcher
- Born: April 4, 1986 (age 40); Decatur, Georgia, U.S.
- Bats: Right Throws: Right

NPB debut
- May 1, 2014, for the Hokkaido Nippon-Ham Fighters

NPB statistics (through 2014 season)
- Win–loss record: 0–5
- Earned run average: 3.97
- Strikeouts: 33
- Stats at Baseball Reference

Teams
- Hokkaido Nippon-Ham Fighters (2014)
Medals
Men's baseball
Representing United States
Olympic Games
Silver medal – second place	2020 Tokyo	Team

Anthony Scott Carter (born April 4, 1986) is an American former professional baseball pitcher. He previously pitched for the Hokkaido Nippon-Ham Fighters of Nippon Professional Baseball. He was a member of the United States national baseball team that won a silver medal in the 2020 Summer Olympics.

== Professional career ==
=== Chicago White Sox ===
Carter graduated from Parkview High School in Lilburn, Georgia. He attended Georgia Perimeter College, and was selected by the Chicago White Sox in the 26th round of the 2005 MLB draft. He made his professional debut in 2006 with the Bristol White Sox and spent the whole season there as a starter, going 2–8 with a 7.67 ERA across 63.1 innings. In 2007, Carter was promoted to the Great Falls White Sox and posted much better numbers, with a 5–3 record and 3.93 ERA in 15 starts. He split the 2008 season between the Winston-Salem Warthogs and Kannapolis Intimidators, registering a combined 11–7 record and 4.36 ERA across 27 starts. In 2009, Carter spent the entire year with Winston-Salem, going 11–7 with a 4.36 ERA and registering career highs in strikeouts (149) and innings pitched (154.2)

In 2010, Carter was promoted again to the Double-A Birmingham Barons, and early in the season transitioned from a starting pitcher to a closer. He finished the year with 22 saves and a 3.92 ERA over 57.1 innings pitched. He split the next season between Birmingham and the Triple-A Charlotte Knights, serving as both a setup man and closer. In 2012, Carter spent the entire year with Charlotte out of the bullpen, posting a 4–6 record with a 4.60 ERA over 62.2 innings.

Prior to the 2013 season, the White Sox added Carter to their 40-man roster. However, they opted not to tender him a contract for the 2013 season, and Carter later elected free agency.

=== Boston Red Sox ===
On December 4, 2012, Carter signed a minor league contract with the Boston Red Sox that included an invite to Spring Training. He spent the year with the Pawtucket Red Sox as a closer and setup man, registering a 3.47 ERA and earning 24 saves. He was selected as a Mid-Season All-Star of the International League. He elected free agency on November 4, 2013.

=== San Diego Padres ===
On November 18, 2013, Carter signed a minor league deal with the San Diego Padres that included an invitation to Spring Training. He appeared in 3 games for the El Paso Chihuahuas, giving up 2 earned runs in 3 innings pitched.

=== Hokkaido Nippon-Ham Fighters ===
In April 2014, the Padres sold Carter's contract to the Hokkaido Nippon-Ham Fighters of Nippon Professional Baseball's Pacific League. As a reliever, Carter posted a 0–5 record with a 3.97 ERA over 45 1/3 innings. He became a free agent following the season.

=== Texas Rangers ===
On December 16, 2014, Carter signed a minor league contract with the Chicago Cubs and was assigned to the Triple–A Iowa Cubs. However, he was released by the club on June 12, 2015, without making an appearance for Iowa.

On February 27, 2016, Carter signed a minor league deal with the Texas Rangers and was assigned to the Triple–A Round Rock Express. In 21 appearances, he registered a 6.10 ERA and struck out 17 batters in 20 2/3 innings. Carter elected free agency following the season on November 7.

On December 16, 2016, Carter re-signed with the Rangers on a new minor league contract. However, he was later released by the organization prior to the start of the 2017 season.

=== Lancaster Barnstormers ===
On April 29, 2017, Carter signed with the Lancaster Barnstormers of the Atlantic League of Professional Baseball. Operating mainly as a closer, he posted career highs in saves (31) and ERA (3.12). He became a free agent following the season.

=== Rieleros de Aguascalientes ===
On February 9, 2018, Carter signed with the Rieleros de Aguascalientes of the Mexican League. In the first half of the season, he pitched to a 4–3 record with a league-leading 1.93 ERA and 0.95 WHIP. He was named a Midseason All-Star of the LMB's North Division. Carter returned for the second portion of the year, registering a 1–3 record and 5.70 ERA in 22 relief appearances.

=== Saraperos de Saltillo ===
On February 5, 2020, Carter signed with the Saraperos de Saltillo of the Mexican League. He did not appear in a game in 2020, as the LMB season was canceled due to the COVID-19 pandemic. Carter re-signed with the club for the 2021 season. He made 18 appearances as the team's closer, posting an 0–2 record with a 4.67 ERA, 19 strikeouts, and seven saves.

In 2022, Carter made 12 appearances for Monterrey, recording a 3.60 ERA with seven strikeouts and four saves over 10 innings pitched. Carter was released by the Sultanes on June 3, 2022.

== International career ==
In May 2021, Carter was named to the roster of the United States national baseball team for qualifying for baseball at the 2020 Summer Olympics. After the team qualified, he was named to the Olympics roster on July 2. The team went on to win silver, falling to Japan in the gold-medal game.
