= Zack Weiss =

American-Israeli baseball player (born 1992)

Free agent
- Pitcher
- Born: June 16, 1992 (age 34); Irvine, California, U.S.
- Bats: Right Throws: Right

MLB debut
- April 12, 2018, for the Cincinnati Reds

MLB statistics (through 2023 season)
- Win–loss record: 1–1
- Earned run average: 4.61
- Strikeouts: 33
- Stats at Baseball Reference

Teams
- Cincinnati Reds (2018); Los Angeles Angels (2022–2023); Boston Red Sox (2023)

Zachary Daniel Weiss (Hebrew: זאק וייס; born June 16, 1992) is an American-Israeli professional baseball pitcher who is a free agent. He has previously played in Major League Baseball (MLB) for the Cincinnati Reds, Los Angeles Angels, and Boston Red Sox.

Weiss was a 2015 Southern League All Star, and a 2015 MILB.com Cincinnati Organization All Star, after a season in which his 30 saves were second-most in Minor League Baseball. The Cincinnati Reds added Weiss to their active roster for Opening Day 2018, and he made his major league debut that year.

In 2018, he became a dual Israeli citizen. He pitched for Team Israel at the 2019 European Baseball Championship. He also pitched for the team at the Africa/Europe 2020 Olympic Qualification tournament in Italy in September 2019, which Israel won to qualify to play baseball at the 2020 Summer Olympics in Tokyo. He pitched for Team Israel at the 2020 Summer Olympics in Tokyo in the summer of 2021, and won its game against Mexico. He pitched for Team Israel in the 2023 World Baseball Classic as well as the 2026 World Baseball Classic

== Early and personal life ==
Weiss was born in Irvine, California, to Ernest and Nancy Weiss, has a younger sister, Ariana, and is Jewish. He was bar mitzvahed at Congregation B’nai Israel in Tustin, California. In October 2018 he became a dual Israeli citizen, partly to help Israel's baseball team make the 2020 Olympics.

Weiss played baseball for Northwood High School in Irvine, where as a senior he was second-team All-California Interscholastic Federation Southern Section Division II and second-team All-Sea View League. Academically, he had a 4.0 GPA.

== College ==
He was drafted by the Pittsburgh Pirates in the 10th round of the 2010 Major League Baseball draft. He did not sign, and instead attended the University of California, Los Angeles (UCLA), where he majored in geography and environmental studies and played college baseball for the UCLA Bruins baseball team. In 2011, he played collegiate summer baseball in the Cape Cod Baseball League for the Yarmouth-Dennis Red Sox. In his junior year of college, he switched from being a starter to pitching as a reliever, had a 2.25 earned run average (ERA), and helped the Bruins win the 2013 NCAA Division I baseball tournament to capture their first national baseball championship. He was a 2013 Jewish Sports Review Division I College Baseball All-American, along with Alex Bregman and Brad Goldberg.

== Professional career ==
Weiss has four pitches; he mostly throws his 94–95 mph (151–153 km/h) four-seam fastball and an 84–85 mph (135–137 km/h) slider, and also throws a curveball and a changeup.

=== Cincinnati Reds ===
Weiss was then selected by the Cincinnati Reds in the sixth round, with the 195th overall selection, of the 2013 Major League Baseball draft. Weiss signed with the Reds and made his professional debut with the Arizona League Reds, and also played for the Billings Mustangs that year. Weiss spent 2014 with the Dayton Dragons of the Single–A Midwest League, for whom he was 2–4 with a 2.42 ERA, with 80 strikeouts in 63 1/3 innings.

Weiss spent 2015 with the Daytona Tortugas of the High–A Florida State League and the Pensacola Blue Wahoos of the Double-A Southern League. He had a Pensacola-record 25 saves (leading the league; in 27 opportunities), and 30 saves (second in the minor leagues; in 32 opportunities) in total between the two teams. In 63 2/3 innings, he had a 1.98 ERA and gave up 42 hits and 15 walks, while striking out 90 batters (averaging 12.7 strikeouts per nine innings). He was a 2015 Southern League All Star, and a 2015 MILB.com Cincinnati Organization All Star. After the season, he played in the Arizona Fall League. He suffered an elbow injury in early 2016 while in major-league spring training, did not pitch that year, and underwent surgery to transpose the ulnar nerve and to remove scar tissue in his pitching elbow in December 2016.

In 2017, Weiss was 2–1 with one save and a 2.08 ERA, and 19 strikeouts in 13 innings, for Daytona, and 2–4 with nine saves (tied for 7th in the league) and a 2.89 ERA, and 37 strikeouts in 28 innings, for Pensacola. Between the two teams, he averaged 12.3 strikeouts per nine innings. The Reds added him to their 40-man roster after the 2017 season. In 2018 in the minors, between the Arizona Reds, Pensacola Blue Wahoos, and the Louisville Bats he was 3–3 with one save and a 5.40 ERA, and 26 strikeouts in 24 1/3 innings.

Reds manager Bryan Price said in spring training in 2018: "if he doesn't make the team I imagine we'll see him at some point during the year." Cincinnati added Weiss to their active roster on their Opening Day, March 30, 2018, and he made his major-league debut on April 12, at Great American Ball Park against the St. Louis Cardinals. He gave up two walks and two home runs to the four batters he faced, without recording an out. It was Weiss' only major-league appearance for the Reds; he was released by the team on September 1, 2018.

=== Minnesota Twins ===
On November 1, 2018, Weiss signed a minor-league deal with the Minnesota Twins. During the 2019 season, pitching for the Double-A Pensacola Blue Wahoos and Triple-A Rochester Red Wings, he was a combined 1–3 with a 7.24 ERA in 16 relief appearances, with 30 strikeouts in 27 1/3 innings. He was released by the organization on July 15, 2019.

=== Long Island Ducks ===
On July 19, 2019, Weiss signed with the Long Island Ducks of the Atlantic League of Professional Baseball. Pitching for them in 2019, he was 4–1 with one save and a 4.68 ERA in 16 relief appearances, as he struck out 34 batters in 25 innings. He became a free agent following the season.

=== Sugar Land Skeeters ===
On February 18, 2020, Weiss signed a minor-league deal with the Cleveland Indians. He did not appear in a game for the organization due to the cancellation of the minor league season because of the COVID-19 pandemic. Weiss was released by the Indians on May 29.

On August 4, 2020, Weiss signed with the Sugar Land Skeeters of the Constellation Energy League. In five relief appearances, he posted a 5.40 ERA while striking out seven batters in 6 2/3 innings.

=== Kansas City Monarchs ===
On February 25, 2021, Weiss signed with the Kansas City Monarchs of the American Association of Professional Baseball. Weiss allowed one run in two innings of work in his only appearance for the Monarchs.

=== Seattle Mariners ===
On May 22, 2021, Weiss had his contract purchased by the Seattle Mariners organization. Pitching for the Tacoma Rainiers of the Triple-A West in 2021, he was 2–3 with one save and a 4.31 ERA. In 30 games (one start) he pitched 39 2/3 innings, striking out 56 batters (12.7 strikeouts per 9 innings).

=== Los Angeles Angels ===
On November 28, 2021, Weiss signed a minor league contract with the Los Angeles Angels. He began the 2022 season with the Triple-A Salt Lake Bees, with whom he was 2–3 with three saves and a 4.50 ERA in 43 relief appearances, covering 50 innings in which he had 65 strikeouts and held batters to a .226 batting average. He had his contract selected on September 1, 2022, and with the Angels was 0–1 with a 3.38 ERA in 12 relief appearances, as in 13 1/3 innings he gave up seven hits and struck out 18 batters (12.2 strikeouts per 9 innings). Between both the majors and the minors in 2022, right-handed batters hit .161/.240/.277 against him.

Weiss began the 2023 season with Triple-A Salt Lake, with whom he was 2–1 with two saves and a 6.03 ERA, as he struck out 50 batters in 37 1/3 innings (12.1 strikeouts per 9 innings). He made six relief appearances for the Angels, logging a 5.06 ERA with 7 strikeouts in 5 1/3 innings pitched. On August 22, Weiss was designated for assignment.

=== Boston Red Sox ===
On August 25, 2023, Weiss was claimed off waivers by the Boston Red Sox and assigned to their Triple-A affiliate, the Worcester Red Sox. In four relief appearances he had two saves as he pitched four scoreless innings for Worcester, with six strikeouts. He was added to Boston's active roster on September 9, and optioned back to Worcester on September 23.

In six relief appearances for the Red Sox, he was 0–0 with a 2.08 ERA, as in 8.2 innings he struck out 8 batters and had an 0.808 WHIP. He threw his slider 65% of the time, and his fastball 35% of the time. Weiss was designated for assignment on January 31, 2024.

In 2023, 63.7% of his pitches were sliders, against which batters hit .121, and 7.1% were cutters, as to which opponents did not have a hit. His fastball averaged 94.3 mph, and he induced a 13.9% swinging-strike rate and 33% opponents’ chase rate in his major league career to date.

=== Minnesota Twins (second stint) ===
On February 7, 2024, Weiss was claimed off waivers by the Minnesota Twins. On April 9, he was placed on the 60–day injured list with a right shoulder strain. Following his activation from the injured list on July 17, Weiss was removed from the 40–man roster and sent outright to the Triple–A St. Paul Saints. In 21 appearances split between the rookie-level Florida Complex League Twins, Single-A Fort Myers Mighty Mussels, and St. Paul, he accumulated a 2-1 record and 4.66 ERA with 34 strikeouts. Weiss elected free agency following the season on November 4.

=== St. Louis Cardinals ===
On January 27, 2025, Weiss signed a minor league contract with the St. Louis Cardinals. He made 43 appearances for the Triple-A Memphis Redbirds, registering a 3-2 record and 5.43 ERA with 77 strikeouts and two saves across 66 1/3 innings pitched. Weiss elected free agency following the season on November 6.

== International career ==
Weiss pitched for Team Israel at the 2019 European Baseball Championship, going 1–0 with one save and a 0.00 ERA as in four relief appearances he pitched 6 1/3 innings and gave up one hit (holding batters to a .050 batting average) and three walks while striking out five batters. He also pitched for the team at the Africa/Europe 2020 Olympic Qualification tournament in Italy in September 2019, which Israel won to qualify to play baseball at the 2020 Summer Olympics in Tokyo. In the tournament, he was 0–0 with a 6.00 ERA over three innings in which he gave up one hit, four walks, and had six strikeouts.

Weiss pitched for Team Israel at the 2020 Summer Olympics in Tokyo in the summer of 2021, and won its game against Mexico. Overall, in three games Weiss pitched seven innings, gave up nine hits and seven earned runs, and struck out 11 batters. He pitched for Team Israel in the 2023 World Baseball Classic and the 2026 World Baseball Classic.

After the 2023 Hamas-led attack on Israel, Weiss said: "I'm not arguing against the people of Palestine being free and treated fairly, but ... Hamas is a terrorist organization bent on extermination of the Jews and eradicating the world of the land of Israel ... kind of all of our holidays are basically celebrating 'they tried to kill us, and they didn’t get us all.' That's the majority of the Jewish holidays... To see what you saw and applaud it, that's not human... when you see families slaughtered indiscriminately. And these people are posting videos of it, they're proud of it, they're parading, they're taking hostages. This isn't war. It's terrorism at its most disgusting level."

== See also ==
- List of Jewish Major League Baseball players
