= Hikaru Kawase =

Japanese baseball player (born 1997)

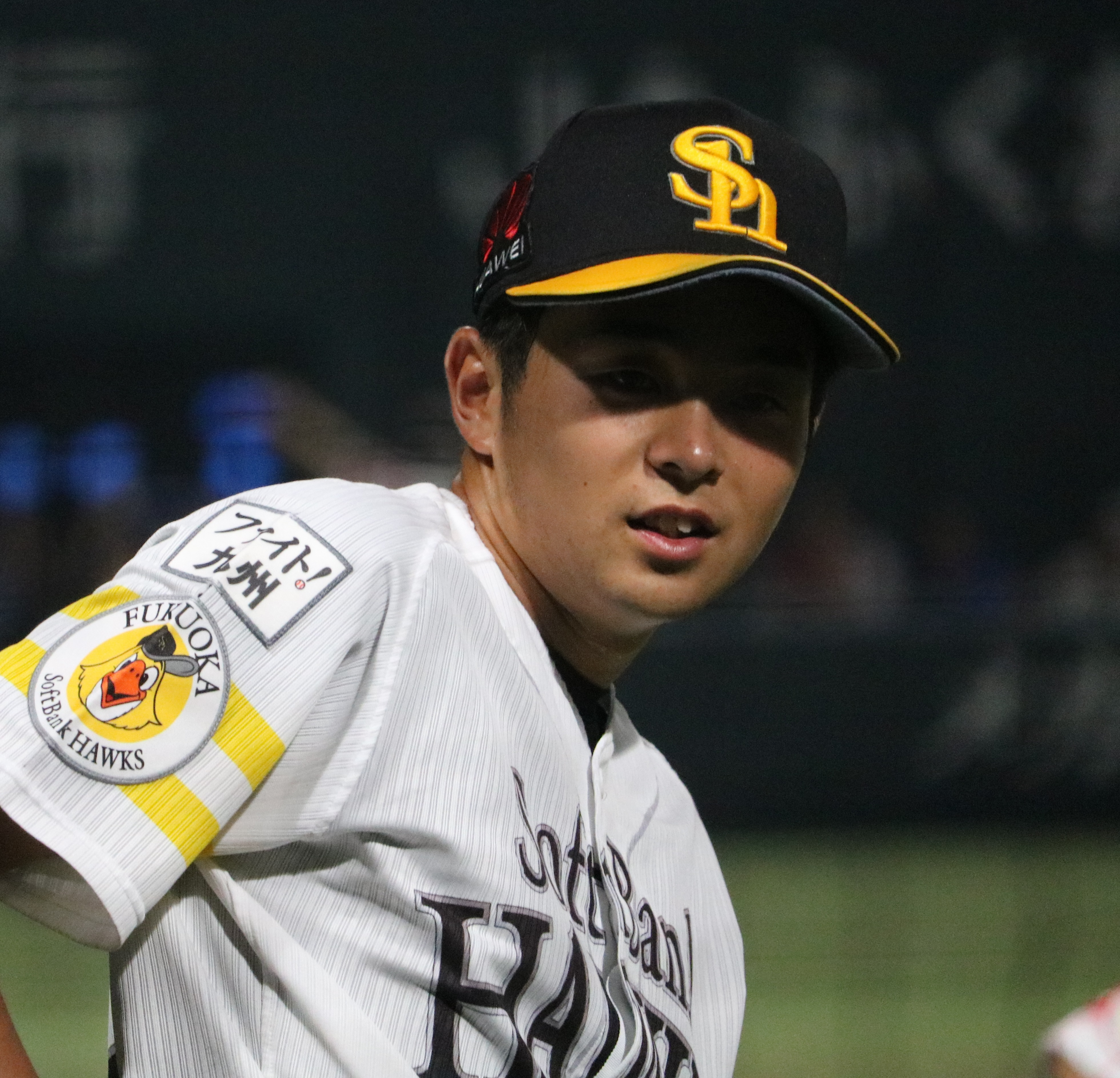
- Kawase with the Fukuoka SoftBank Hawks.

Fukuoka SoftBank Hawks – No. 0
- Infielder
- Born: September 15, 1997 (age 29); Ōita, Ōita, Japan
- Bats: Left Throws: Right

NPB debut
- May 23, 2018, for the Fukuoka SoftBank Hawks

NPB statistics (through 2025 season)
- Batting average: .237
- Home runs: 2
- Runs batted in: 69

Teams
- Fukuoka SoftBank Hawks (2016–present)

Career highlights and awards
- 3× Japan Series champion (2018, 2020, 2025)

Hikaru Kawase (川瀬 晃, Kawase Hikaru; born September 15, 1997) is a Japanese professional baseball infielder for the Fukuoka SoftBank Hawks of Nippon Professional Baseball (NPB).

== Early baseball career ==
Kawase participated in the 1st grade summer 95th Japanese High School Baseball Championship with Shunsuke Kasaya and Masato Morishita at the Ōita Prefectural Ōita Commercial High School. He had a rivalry with Morishita, who competed for pitcher and shortstop positions in high school.

== Professional career ==
On October 22, 2015, Kawase was drafted by the Fukuoka Softbank Hawks in the 2015 Nippon Professional Baseball draft.

On January 5, 2016, He underwent surgery for a broken left hand.

In 2016-2017 season, he played in the Western League of NPB's minor leagues and played in informal matches against Shikoku Island League Plus's teams.

On May 23, 2018, Kawase debuted as a shortstop against the Saitama Seibu Lions. On the 24th of the following day, he recorded his first hit. And he was selected as the Japan Series roster in the 2018 Japan Series.

In the 2019 season, Kawase finished the regular season in 29 games with a batting average of .176.

In 2020 season, Kawase finished the regular season in 70 games with a batting average of .191, a RBI of 6 runs and a stolen base of 2. Kawase was selected as the Japan Series roster in the 2020 Japan Series. And he recorded his first hit in the Japan Series.

September 20, 2021, he was named a starter against the Tohoku Rakuten Golden Eagles and recorded three hits. However, he did not get many chances and finished the 2021 season with a .185 batting average in 21 games played.

On July 18, 2022, Kawase would record a two-run double against the Chiba Lotte Marines. On August 18, he was removed from the first team registration with a positive COVID-19, but was re-registered on September 3. On September 12 against the Saitama Seibu Lions he started the seventh inning on defense and recorded a two-run double. In 2022 season, he finished the regular season with a .278 batting average, 11 runs batted in, and 2 stolen bases in 73 games, his highest number of appearances despite being used as an infield reserve.

In 2023 season, Kawase played in a career-high 102 games, and finished the season with a .236 batting average, a 15 RBI, a 2stolen bases, and a 18 sacrifice bunts.

On December 13, 2023, announced that his uniform number would be changed from 00 to 0.
