= Baseball at the 2020 Summer Olympics =

Baseball at the Games of the XXXII Olympiad
- Venue: Yokohama Stadium, Yokohama; Fukushima Azuma Stadium, Fukushima City
- Dates: 28 July – 7 August 2021
- No. of events: 1
- Competitors: 144 from 6 nations
- Teams: 6

Medalists
1st place, gold medalist(s)		Japan
2nd place, silver medalist(s)		United States
3rd place, bronze medalist(s)		Dominican Republic

Baseball was featured at the 2020 Summer Olympics, in Tokyo, for the first time since the 2008 Summer Olympics. Six national teams competed in the tournament: Israel, Japan (host), Mexico, South Korea, the United States, and the Dominican Republic.

Baseball/softball was one of five optional sports that were added to the programme of the 2020 Summer Olympics. It did not return in 2024 for the Paris Summer Olympics. The tournament was originally scheduled to be held in 2020, but on 24 March 2020, the Olympics were postponed to 2021 due to the COVID-19 pandemic. As a result, the games were played behind closed doors.

The medals for the competition were presented by Yasuhiro Yamashita, IOC Member and Olympic Champion from Japan, and the medalists' bouquets were presented by Riccardo Fraccari, WBSC President, Italy.

== Medalists ==
Event	Gold	Silver	Bronze
Men's tournament	Japan; Kōyō Aoyagi; Suguru Iwazaki; Masato Morishita; Hiromi Itoh; Yoshinobu Yamamoto; Masahiro Tanaka; Yasuaki Yamasaki; Ryoji Kuribayashi; Yūdai Ōno; Kodai Senga; Kaima Taira; Ryutaro Umeno; Takuya Kai; Tetsuto Yamada; Sōsuke Genda; Hideto Asamura; Ryosuke Kikuchi; Hayato Sakamoto; Munetaka Murakami; Kensuke Kondo; Yuki Yanagita; Ryoya Kurihara; Masataka Yoshida; Seiya Suzuki	United States; Shane Baz; Anthony Carter; Brandon Dickson; Anthony Gose; Edwin Jackson; Scott Kazmir; Nick Martinez; Scott McGough; David Robertson; Joe Ryan; Ryder Ryan; Simeon Woods Richardson; Tim Federowicz; Mark Kolozsvary; Nick Allen; Eddy Alvarez; Triston Casas; Todd Frazier; Jamie Westbrook; Tyler Austin; Eric Filia; Patrick Kivlehan; Jack López; Bubba Starling	Dominican Republic; Darío Álvarez; Gabriel Arias; Jairo Asencio; Luis Felipe Castillo; Jumbo Díaz; Junior García; Jhan Mariñez; Cristopher Mercedes; Denyi Reyes; Ramón Rosso; Ángel Sánchez; Raúl Valdés; Roldani Baldwin; Charlie Valerio; José Bautista; Juan Francisco; Jeison Guzmán; Erick Mejia; Gustavo Núñez; Emilio Bonifácio; Melky Cabrera; Johan Mieses; Yefri Pérez; Julio Rodríguez

== Qualification ==
Six national teams qualified for the Olympic baseball tournament. Japan automatically qualified, as the host nation. Israel qualified by winning the September 2019 Europe/Africa continental tournament.

Two teams qualified through the 2019 WBSC Premier12 tournament in November 2019. South Korea qualified as the best-placed team from the Asia/Oceania region (other than Japan, which already qualified as host), while Mexico qualified as the best-placed team from the Americas.

The United States qualified by winning the Americas Qualifying Event that was originally scheduled to take place in March 2020, but was postponed to May/June 2021 because of the COVID-19 pandemic. The final spot was awarded to the Dominican Republic which won a world Final Qualifying Tournament in late June 2021.

Event	Dates	Location(s)	Berth(s)	Qualified
Host nation	—N/a	—N/a	1	Japan
Africa/Europe Qualifying Event	18–22 September 2019	(Italy) Bologna / Parma	1	Israel
2019 WBSC Premier12	2–17 November 2019	(Japan) Tokyo^{1}	2	Mexico; South Korea
Americas Qualifying Event	31 May–5 June 2021	(United States) Port St. Lucie / West Palm Beach	1	United States
Final Qualifying Tournament	22–26 June 2021	(Mexico) Puebla	1	Dominican Republic
Total			6	

^{1} The WBSC Premier12 was played in Japan, Mexico, South Korea, and Taiwan, with the final in Tokyo.

== Competition schedule ==
Legend

GS	Group stage	KO	Knock-out	B	Bronze medal game	F	Gold medal game

Wed 28	Thu 29	Fri 30	Sat 31	Sun 1	Mon 2	Tue 3	Wed 4	Thu 5	Fri 6	Sat 7	
GS				KO						B	F

== Competition format ==
The small number of teams in the tournament resulted in an unusual competition format being adopted that featured 16 games. There was an opening group round-robin round, and a modified double-elimination bracket.

For the group round, there were two pools of three teams each. Each team played the other two teams in its pool once. A total of six games were played in the group round.

In the knockout round, the first three games featured teams that each finished in the same position in their respective pools (A1 vs B1, A2 vs B2, A3 vs B3). The loser of the A3 vs. B3 game was eliminated (with only one loss in the elimination round, plus one or two in the group stage). After this, play continued in double-elimination format until there is one team left in each of the winners and losers brackets. Those two teams played in the gold medal game (a single game; the losers bracket representative does not need to beat the winners bracket representative twice). The last two teams eliminated from the losers bracket played in the bronze medal game. In total, 10 games are played in the knockout round:

1. A3 vs B3 (loser eliminated)
2. A2 vs B2
3. Winner of #1 vs Winner of #2
4. A1 vs B1
5. Loser of #2 vs Loser of #3 (loser eliminated)
6. Loser of #4 vs Winner of #5 (loser to bronze medal game)
7. Winner of #3 vs Winner of #4 (winner to gold medal game)
8. Loser of #7 vs Winner of #6 (winner to gold medal game, loser to bronze medal game)
9. Bronze medal game: Loser of #6 vs Loser of #8
10. Gold medal game: Winner of #7 vs. Winner of #8

Thus, the best two teams from group play face each other in the quarterfinals, with a possible rematch later in the tournament (including the gold medal game, if the winner also wins its next game and the loser wins its next two).

== Group stage ==
The schedule was announced on 28 June 2021. Note that "Qualification" column represents positional seeding in the knockout stage, effective at the conclusion of the group stage.

All times are local (UTC+9).

=== Group A ===
Pos	Team	Pld	W	L	RF	RA	RD	PCT	GB	Qualification
1	Japan (H)	2	2	0	11	7	+4	1.000	—	Round 2
2	Dominican Republic	2	1	1	4	4	0	.500	1	Round 1 game #2
3	Mexico	2	0	2	4	8	−4	.000	2	Round 1 game #1

Source: TOCOG and WBSC
(H) Hosts

28 July 12:00 (JST) Fukushima Azuma Baseball Stadium
Team	1	2	3	4	5	6	7	8	9	R	H	E
Dominican Republic	0	0	0	0	0	0	2	0	1	3	8	0
Japan	0	0	0	0	0	0	1	0	3	4	9	0
WP: Ryoji Kuribayashi (1–0) LP: Jairo Asencio (0–1); Boxscore

30 July 12:00 Yokohama Stadium
Team	1	2	3	4	5	6	7	8	9	R	H	E
Mexico	0	0	0	0	0	0	0	0	0	0	4	0
Dominican Republic	0	0	0	0	1	0	0	0	X	1	6	0
WP: Ángel Sánchez (1–0) LP: Teddy Stankiewicz (0–1) Sv: Luis Felipe Castillo (1); Boxscore

31 July 12:00 Yokohama Stadium
Team	1	2	3	4	5	6	7	8	9	R	H	E
Japan	0	1	1	3	0	0	1	1	0	7	10	0
Mexico	1	0	0	1	0	0	0	2	0	4	7	2
WP: Masato Morishita (1–0) LP: Juan Pablo Oramas (0–1) Sv: Ryoji Kuribayashi (1); Home runs: JPN: Tetsuto Yamada (1), Hayato Sakamoto (1); MEX: Joey Meneses (1); Boxscore

=== Group B ===
Pos	Team	Pld	W	L	RF	RA	RD	PCT	GB	Qualification
1	United States	2	2	0	12	3	+9	1.000	—	Round 2
2	South Korea	2	1	1	8	9	−1	.500	1	Round 1 game #2
3	Israel	2	0	2	6	14	−8	.000	2	Round 1 game #1

Source: TOCOG and WBSC

29 July 19:00 Yokohama Stadium
Team	1	2	3	4	5	6	7	8	9	10	R	H	E
Israel	0	0	2	0	0	2	0	0	1	0	5	7	0
South Korea	0	0	0	2	0	0	3	0	0	1	6	11	0
WP: Oh Seung-hwan (1–0) LP: Jeremy Bleich (0–1); Home runs: ISR: Ian Kinsler (1), Ryan Lavarnway 2 (2); KOR: Oh Ji-hwan (1), Lee Jung-hoo (1), Hyun-soo Kim (1); Boxscore

30 July 19:00 Yokohama Stadium
Team	1	2	3	4	5	6	7	8	9	R	H	E
United States	0	0	3	0	0	1	2	1	1	8	11	0
Israel	0	0	0	1	0	0	0	0	0	1	7	2
WP: Joe Ryan (1–0) LP: Joey Wagman (0–1); Home runs: USA: Tyler Austin (1); ISR: Danny Valencia (1); Boxscore

31 July 19:00 Yokohama Stadium
Team	1	2	3	4	5	6	7	8	9	R	H	E
South Korea	1	0	0	0	0	0	0	0	1	2	5	0
United States	0	0	0	2	2	0	0	0	X	4	6	0
WP: Nick Martinez (1–0) LP: Ko Young-pyo (0–1) Sv: David Robertson (1); Home runs: KOR: None; USA: Triston Casas (1), Nick Allen (1); Boxscore

== Knockout stage ==
=== Bracket ===
Round 1
#1 (Loser Eliminated)
Israel	12
Mexico	5
#2
Dominican Republic	3
South Korea	4
Round 1 repechage
#5
Israel	6
Dominican Republic	7

Round 2
#3
Israel	1
South Korea (7)	11
#4
United States	6
Japan (10)	7
Round 2 repechage
#6
Dominican Republic	1
United States	3

Semifinals
#7
South Korea	2
Japan	5
#8
United States	7
South Korea	2

Gold medal game
#10
Japan	2
United States	0
Bronze medal game
#9
Dominican Republic	10
South Korea	6

=== Round 1 ===
1 August 12:00 Yokohama Stadium
Team	1	2	3	4	5	6	7	8	9	R	H	E
Israel	1	0	5	0	0	0	6	0	0	12	12	0
Mexico	0	0	4	0	0	1	0	0	0	5	8	1
WP: Zack Weiss (1–0) LP: Manny Barreda (0–1); Home runs: ISR: Danny Valencia (2); MEX: None; Boxscore

1 August 19:00 Yokohama Stadium
Team	1	2	3	4	5	6	7	8	9	R	H	E
Dominican Republic	1	0	0	2	0	0	0	0	0	3	6	0
South Korea	1	0	0	0	0	0	0	0	3	4	12	1
WP: Oh Seung-hwan (2–0) LP: Luis Felipe Castillo (0–1); Home runs: DOM: Juan Francisco (1); KOR: None; Boxscore

=== Round 2 ===
2 August 12:00 Yokohama Stadium
Team	1	2	3	4	5	6	7	8	9	R	H	E
Israel	0	0	0	0	1	0	0	X	X	1	3	2
South Korea (7)	1	2	0	0	7	0	1	X	X	11	18	0
WP: Cho Sang-woo (1–0) LP: Joey Wagman (0–2); Home runs: ISR: None; KOR: Oh Ji-hwan (2), Hyun-soo Kim (2); Boxscore

2 August 19:00 Yokohama Stadium
Team	1	2	3	4	5	6	7	8	9	10	R	H	E
United States	0	0	0	3	3	0	0	0	0	0	6	12	2
Japan (10)	0	0	2	1	2	0	0	0	1	1	7	12	0
WP: Ryoji Kuribayashi (2–0) LP: Edwin Jackson (0–1); Home runs: USA: Triston Casas (2); JPN: Seiya Suzuki (1); Boxscore

=== Round 1 repechage ===
3 August 19:00 Yokohama Stadium
Team	1	2	3	4	5	6	7	8	9	R	H	E
Israel	0	0	0	0	4	0	0	2	0	6	9	2
Dominican Republic	1	0	1	0	0	2	1	0	2	7	9	1
WP: Luis Felipe Castillo (1–1) LP: Zack Weiss (1–1); Home runs: ISR: Danny Valencia (3); DOM: Jeison Guzman (1), Johan Mieses (1); Boxscore

=== Round 2 repechage ===
4 August 12:00 Yokohama Stadium
Team	1	2	3	4	5	6	7	8	9	R	H	E
Dominican Republic	0	0	0	0	0	0	0	0	1	1	5	0
United States	2	0	0	0	1	0	0	0	X	3	3	3
WP: Scott Kazmir (1–0) LP: Denyi Reyes (0–1) Sv: David Robertson (2); Home runs: DOM: Charlie Valerio (1); USA: Triston Casas (3), Tyler Austin (2); Boxscore

=== Semifinals ===
4 August 19:00 Yokohama Stadium
Team	1	2	3	4	5	6	7	8	9	R	H	E
South Korea	0	0	0	0	0	2	0	0	0	2	7	1
Japan	0	0	1	0	1	0	0	3	X	5	9	1
WP: Hiromi Itoh (1–0) LP: Go Woo-suk (0–1) Sv: Ryoji Kuribayashi (2); Boxscore

5 August 19:00 Yokohama Stadium
Team	1	2	3	4	5	6	7	8	9	R	H	E
South Korea	0	0	0	0	1	0	1	0	0	2	7	0
United States	0	1	0	1	0	5	0	0	X	7	9	1
WP: Ryder Ryan (1–0) LP: Lee Eui-lee (0–1); Home runs: KOR: None; USA: Jamie Westbrook (1); Boxscore

=== Bronze medal game ===
7 August 12:00 Yokohama Stadium
Team	1	2	3	4	5	6	7	8	9	R	H	E
Dominican Republic	4	0	0	0	1	0	0	5	0	10	14	0
South Korea	0	1	0	1	4	0	0	0	0	6	13	0
WP: Cristopher Mercedes (1–0) LP: Oh Seung-hwan (2–1) Sv: Jumbo Díaz (1); Home runs: DOM: Juan Francisco (2), Julio Rodríguez (1), Johan Mieses (2); KOR: Hyun-soo Kim (3); Boxscore

=== Gold medal game ===
7 August 19:00 Yokohama Stadium
Team	1	2	3	4	5	6	7	8	9	R	H	E
United States	0	0	0	0	0	0	0	0	0	0	6	1
Japan	0	0	1	0	0	0	0	1	X	2	8	0
WP: Masato Morishita (2–0) LP: Nick Martinez (1–1) Sv: Ryoji Kuribayashi (3); Home runs: USA: None; JPN: Munetaka Murakami (1); Boxscore

== Final standings ==
Place	Team	Record
Gold	Japan	5–0
Silver	United States	4–2
Bronze	Dominican Republic	3–3
4	South Korea	3–4
5	Israel	1–4
6	Mexico	0–3

2020 Olympic champions

Japan
First title

== All-Olympic team ==
Awards		Player	Club team
MVP Award		(Japan) Tetsuto Yamada	(Japan) Tokyo Yakult Swallows
Best Defensive Player Honours		(United States) Nick Allen	(United States) Midland RockHounds (Oakland Athletics organization)
Tokyo 2020; All-Olympic; Baseball Team	Right-handed pitcher	(Japan) Yoshinobu Yamamoto	(Japan) Orix Buffaloes
Tokyo 2020; All-Olympic; Baseball Team	Left-handed pitcher	(United States) Anthony Gose	(United States) Columbus Clippers (Cleveland Indians organization)
Tokyo 2020; All-Olympic; Baseball Team	Catcher	(Japan) Takuya Kai	(Japan) Fukuoka SoftBank Hawks
Tokyo 2020; All-Olympic; Baseball Team	First baseman	(United States) Triston Casas	(United States) Portland Sea Dogs (Boston Red Sox organization)
Tokyo 2020; All-Olympic; Baseball Team	Second baseman	(United States) Eddy Alvarez	(United States) Jupiter Hammerheads (Miami Marlins organization)
Tokyo 2020; All-Olympic; Baseball Team	Third baseman	(Dominican Republic) Erick Mejia	(United States) Omaha Storm Chasers (Kansas City Royals organization)
Tokyo 2020; All-Olympic; Baseball Team	Shortstop	(Japan) Hayato Sakamoto	(Japan) Yomiuri Giants
Tokyo 2020; All-Olympic; Baseball Team	Left fielder	(South Korea) Hyun-soo Kim	(South Korea) LG Twins
Tokyo 2020; All-Olympic; Baseball Team	Center fielder	(South Korea) Park Hae-min	(South Korea) Samsung Lions
Tokyo 2020; All-Olympic; Baseball Team	Right fielder	(Israel) Mitch Glasser	(United States) Sioux Falls Canaries
Tokyo 2020; All-Olympic; Baseball Team	Designated hitter	(United States) Tyler Austin	(Japan) Yokohama DeNA BayStars

Selected by the World Baseball Softball Confederation (WBSC).

== See also ==
- Softball at the 2020 Summer Olympics
