= 1995 Junior League World Series =

Tournament information
- Location: Taylor, Michigan
- Dates: August 14–19

Final positions
- Champions: Lake Charles, Louisiana
- Runner-up: Northridge, California

The 1995 Junior League World Series took place from August 14–19 in Taylor, Michigan, United States. Lake Charles, Louisiana defeated Northridge, California in the championship game.

== Teams ==
United States	International
(Ohio) South Point, Ohio Central	(Ontario) LaSalle, Ontario Canada
(New Jersey) Millburn, New Jersey East	(Saudi Arabia) Dhahran, Saudi Arabia Europe
(Louisiana) Lake Charles, Louisiana; South Lake Charles; South	(Sonora) Hermosillo, Sonora Mexico
(California) Northridge, California West	Yabucoa, Puerto Rico Puerto Rico

== Results ==
Upper round 1	Upper round 2	Upper final	World Championship
—	Canada	6
—	Mexico	5
1–0	Canada	12
1–0	Puerto Rico	11
—	Saudi Arabia	3
—	Puerto Rico	8
2–0	Canada
2–0	Louisiana
—	California	0
—	Louisiana	3
1–0	Louisiana
1–0	New Jersey
—	New Jersey
—	Ohio	3–0	Louisiana	3	8
4–1	California	4	2
Lower round 1	Lower round 2	Lower round 3	Lower final
1–1	New Jersey
0–1	Mexico	4	1–1	Mexico	2–1	Canada	0
0–1	Saudi Arabia	2	2–1	Mexico	3	3–1	California (F/5)	18
2–1	California	7
1–1	Puerto Rico	3
0–1	California	3	1–1	California (F/5)	15
0–1	Ohio	1

1995 Junior League World Series Champions
South Lake Charles LL
Lake Charles, Louisiana
