= Nick Allen (infielder) =

American baseball player (born 1998)

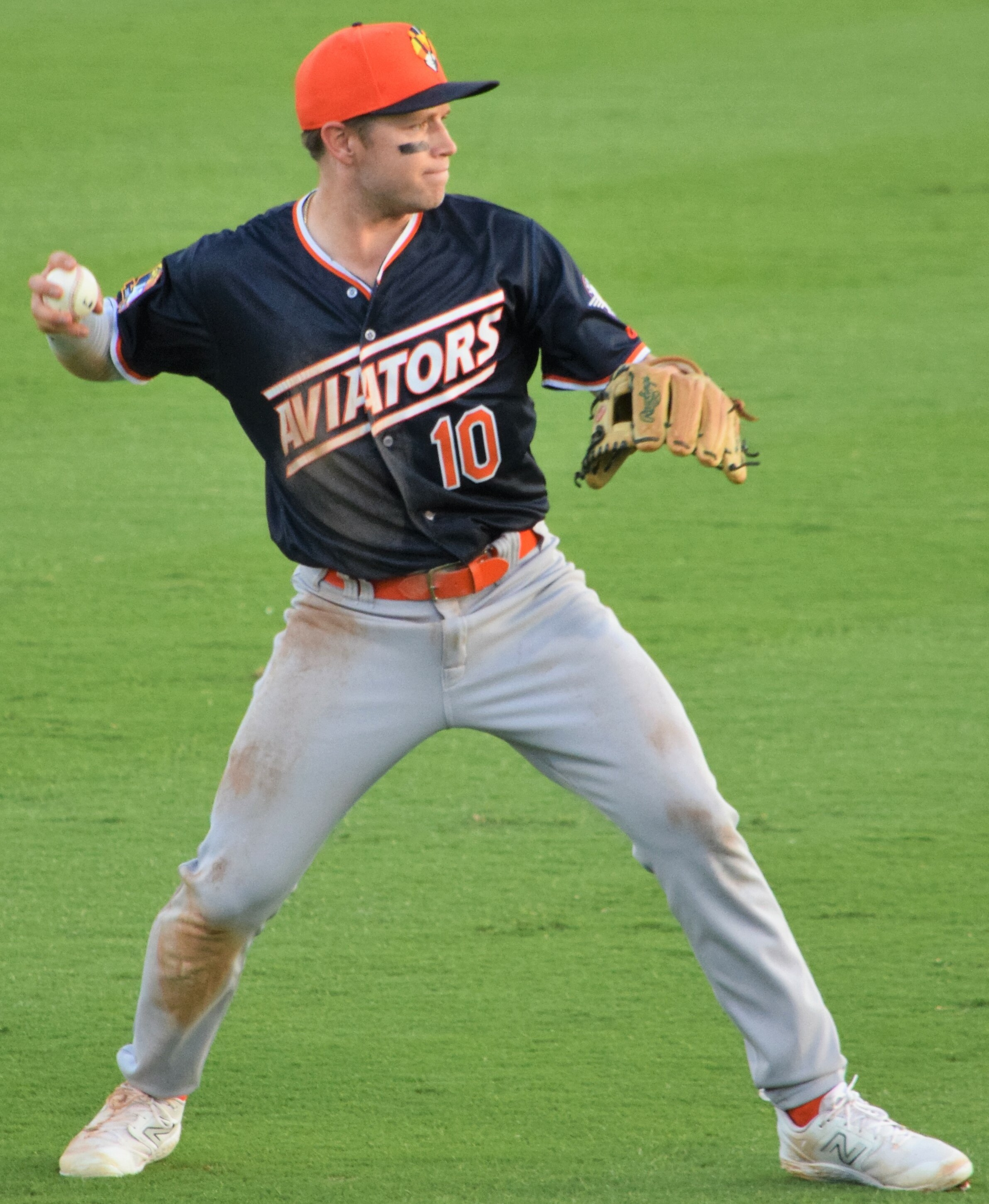
- Allen with the Las Vegas Aviators

Houston Astros – No. 20
- Shortstop
- Born: October 8, 1998 (age 28); San Diego, California, U.S.
- Bats: Right Throws: Right

MLB debut
- April 19, 2022, for the Oakland Athletics

MLB statistics (through 2026 season)
- Batting average: .221
- Home runs: 12
- Runs batted in: 79
- Stats at Baseball Reference

Teams
- Oakland Athletics (2022–2024); Atlanta Braves (2025); Houston Astros (2026–present)
Medals
Men's baseball
Representing United States
Olympic Games
Silver medal – second place	2020 Tokyo	Team

Nicholas Ryan Allen (born October 8, 1998) is an American professional baseball shortstop and second baseman for the Houston Astros of Major League Baseball (MLB). He has previously played in MLB for the Oakland Athletics and Atlanta Braves. Allen made his MLB debut in 2022.

== Amateur career ==
Allen attended Francis Parker School in San Diego, California, where he played baseball. During his freshman year, he committed to play college baseball at the University of Southern California. As a junior in 2016, he slashed .469/.570/.816. In 2017, his senior year, Allen hit .297 with two home runs, ten doubles, and 23 stolen bases. For his high school career, he had a fielding percentage of .963.

== Professional career ==
=== Oakland Athletics ===
After Allen's senior year of high school, he was selected by the Oakland Athletics in the third round of the 2017 Major League Baseball draft. He signed for $2 million.

After signing with Oakland, Allen made his professional debut with the Rookie-level Arizona League Athletics, hitting .254 with one home run and 14 RBI over 35 games. Allen spent the 2018 season with the Beloit Snappers of the Single–A Midwest League with whom he batted .239 with 34 RBI and 24 stolen bases over 121 games. In 2019, he began the year with the Stockton Ports of the High–A California League with whom he was named an All-Star. He was placed on the injured list in late June after suffering a leg injury, and missed the remainder of the season. Over 72 games with Stockton, Allen slashed .292/.363/.434 with three home runs, 25 RBI, and 13 stolen bases. He was selected to play in the Arizona Fall League for the Mesa Solar Sox following the season. Allen did not play a minor league game in 2020 due to the cancellation of the minor league season because of the COVID-19 pandemic.

To begin the 2021 season, Allen was assigned to the Midland RockHounds of the Double-A Central. He was placed on the temporarily inactive list twice during the season while participating in Olympic competition. After returning from the Olympics in mid-August, Allen was promoted to the Las Vegas Aviators of the Triple-A West. Over 89 games played between the two clubs, Allen slashed .288/.346/.403 with six home runs, 41 RBI, and 12 stolen bases. On November 19, 2021, Oakland added Allen to their 40-man roster to protect him from the Rule 5 draft. He returned to Las Vegas to begin the 2022 season.

On April 18, 2022, Allen was added to Oakland's roster as a COVID-related substitute. He made his major league debut the next day as the starting second baseman. On April 22, he collected his first career hit, a single off of Baltimore Orioles reliever Dillon Tate. On June 21, Allen hit his first major league home run, a two-run shot off of Seattle Mariners starter Marco Gonzales. In 100 games during his season, he slashed .207/.256/.291 with four home runs, 19 RBI, and three stolen bases.

Allen made 106 appearances for Oakland in 2023, batting .221/.263/.287 with four home runs, 20 RBI, and five stolen bases. He played in 41 contests for Oakland in 2024, hitting .175/.216/.247 with one home run and four RBI.

=== Atlanta Braves ===
On November 11, 2024, Allen was traded to the Atlanta Braves in exchange for minor league pitcher Jared Johnson. During the 2025 season, Allen began wearing goggles to correct astigmatism. Allen reached a new career high in games played (135) while finishing his year with fourth in the National League in Outs Above Average with 17; he also batted .221/.284/.251 with 22 RBI and eight stolen bases. After the end of the season, Allen was nominated for a Gold Glove award for his defense at the shortstop position.

=== Houston Astros ===
On November 19, 2025, the Braves traded Allen to the Houston Astros in exchange for Mauricio Dubón. In 2026, he played in 94 games for the Astros and batted .283 with three home runs and 14 RBI. He missed time during the season due to back spasms and a left hamstring strain. Allen played 42 games at second base, 35 at shortstop, and 15 at third base. He made his playoff debut during that season's Wild Card Series, going 0-for-3 in one game prior to a sweep of the Astros by the Chicago White Sox.

== International career ==
Allen competed for a spot on the United States national baseball team in advance of the 2020 Summer Olympics and was subsequently named to the roster of the national team for the Americas Qualifying Event. After the national team qualified, he was named to the Olympics roster on July 2. Following the Olympic competition, during which the United States won a silver medal, Allen was named Best Defensive Player. For the tournament, he batted .286 with three extra-base hits.

== Personal life ==
Allen is married to Savannah Boone, daughter of former professional baseball player Bret Boone.

== See also ==
- List of Olympic medalists in baseball
