= 1995 Senior League World Series =

American youth baseball tournament

Tournament information
- Location: Kissimmee, Florida
- Dates: August 13–19, 1995

Final positions
- Champions: Dunedin, Florida
- Runner-up: Clarksville, Indiana

The 1995 Senior League World Series took place from August 13–19 in Kissimmee, Florida, United States. Dunedin, Florida defeated Clarksville, Indiana in the championship game. It was Florida's second straight championship.

== Teams ==
United States	International
(Florida) Winter Park, Florida; District 3 Host	Langley, British Columbia Canada
Clarksville, Indiana Central	Ramstein, Germany Europe
(New York (state)) Haverstraw, New York East	(Taiwan) Taipei, Taiwan Far East
(Florida) Dunedin, Florida South	Panama City, Panama Latin America
(California) Stockton, California West	

== Results ==
=== Winner's Bracket ===
Opening Game
—	Taiwan	11
—	Panama	0

—
1–0	Taiwan	1
—	(Florida) Host	8
—	Florida	12
—	Canada	1
—	Indiana	10
—	Germany	4
—	California	13
—	(New York (state)) New York	2

—
1–0	(Florida) Host	1
1–0	Florida	2
1–0	Indiana	1
1–0	California	0

Bracket Final
2–0	Florida	2
2–0	Indiana	1

=== Loser's Bracket ===
—
0–1	Panama	10
0–1	Canada	7
0–1	(New York (state)) New York	2
0–1	Germany	3

—
1–1	Taiwan	11
1–1	Panama	0
1–1	California	11
1–1	Canada	6

—
1–1	(Florida) Host	5
2–1	Taiwan	7
2–1	Indiana	8
2–1	California	5

Bracket Final
3–1	Taiwan	2
3–1	Indiana	3

=== Placement Bracket ===
—
0–2	Germany	8
0–2	(New York (state)) New York	9

—
1–2	Canada	3
1–2	(New York (state)) New York	1
1–2	(Florida) Host	8
1–2	Panama	5

—
2–2	California	12
2–2	Canada	4
3–2	Taiwan	0
2–2	(Florida) Host	4

Third-place game
3–2	California	9
3–2	(Florida) Host	2

=== Elimination Round ===
Semifinals
2–0	Florida	2
2–0	Indiana	1
3–1	Taiwan	2
3–1	Indiana	3

World championship
3–0	Florida	3
4–1	Indiana	2
Third-place game
3–2	California	9
3–2	(Florida) Host	2

1995 Senior League World Series Champions
Dunedin, Florida
