= Ryder Ryan =

American baseball player (born 1995)

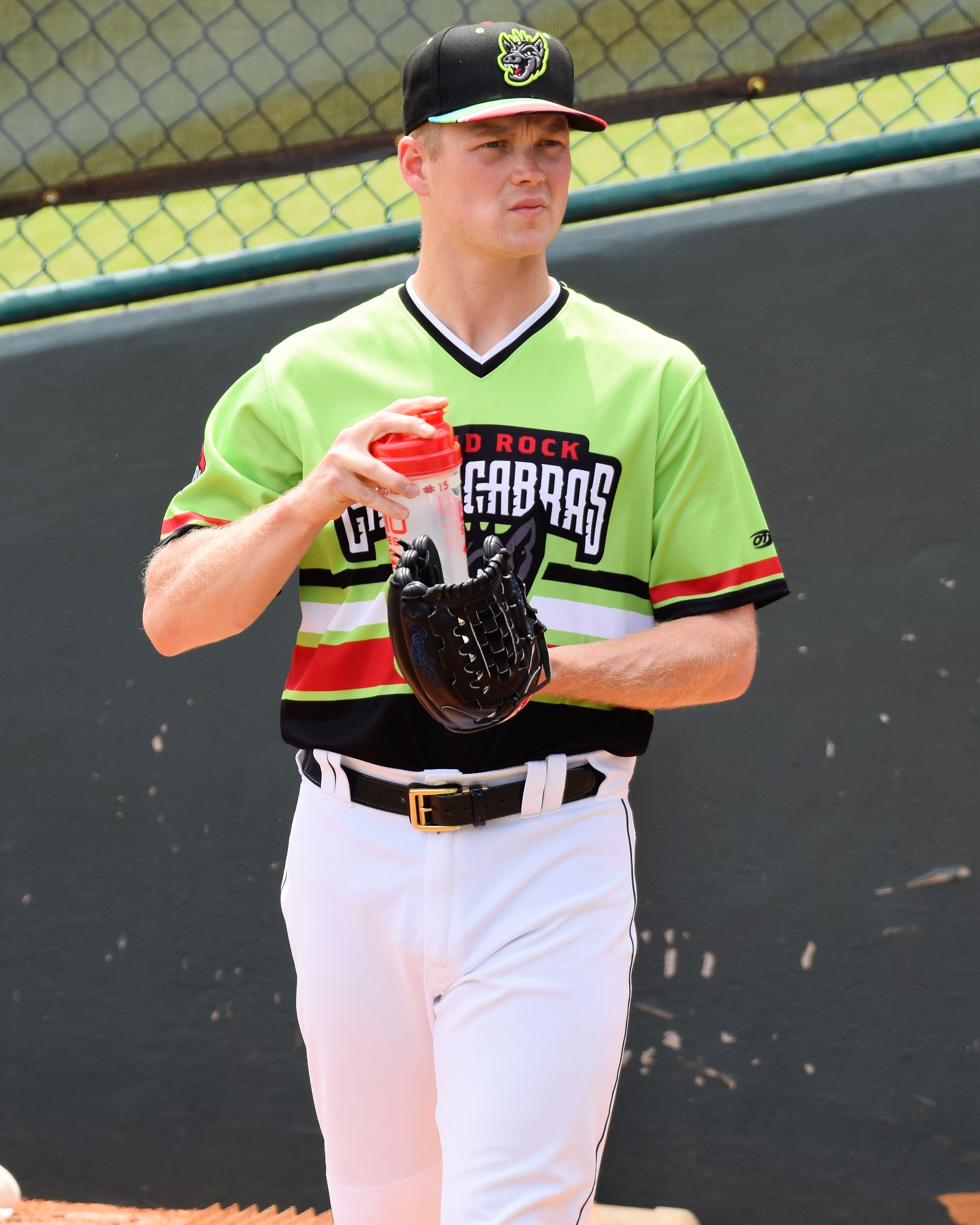
- Ryan with the Round Rock Express in 2022

Free agent
- Pitcher
- Born: May 11, 1995 (age 31); Huntersville, North Carolina, U.S.
- Bats: Right Throws: Right

MLB debut
- August 11, 2023, for the Seattle Mariners

MLB statistics (through 2024 season)
- Win–loss record: 1–0
- Earned run average: 5.40
- Strikeouts: 19
- Stats at Baseball Reference

Teams
- Seattle Mariners (2023); Pittsburgh Pirates (2024)
Medals
Men's baseball
Representing United States
Olympic Games
Silver medal – second place	2020 Tokyo	Team

Ryder Michael Ryan (born May 11, 1995) is an American professional baseball pitcher who is a free agent. He has previously played in Major League Baseball (MLB) for the Seattle Mariners and Pittsburgh Pirates.

== Amateur career ==
Ryan attended North Mecklenburg High School in Huntersville, North Carolina, where he played baseball for his father, Sean. As a junior in 2013, he hit .597 with 29 RBIs along with pitching to a 0.28 ERA in 54.2 innings. He committed to play college baseball at the University of North Carolina for the North Carolina Tar Heels the summer before his senior year. As a senior, he batted .536 with six home runs and 28 RBIs while also pitching to a 7–1 record and a 0.57 ERA.

Although Ryan was projected to be drafted as high as the third round in the 2014 Major League Baseball draft, he was not drafted until the 40th round by the Cleveland Indians. He did not sign and instead enrolled at North Carolina. In his freshman and sophomore years at North Carolina, Ryan appeared in only 33 games as a hitter, and only one game as a pitcher.

== Professional career ==
=== Cleveland Indians ===
After Ryan's sophomore year, he was drafted once again by the Indians, this time as a pitcher, in the 30th round of the 2016 Major League Baseball draft. He chose to sign with Cleveland for a $100,000 signing bonus rather than return to school. After signing, Ryan made his professional debut with the Arizona League Indians where he was 0–1 with a 3.86 ERA in 18 2/3 relief innings pitched. He began 2017 with the Lake County Captains, where he was named a Midwest League All-Star after compiling a 0.84 ERA in 21 1/3 innings pitched.

=== New York Mets ===
On August 9, 2017, Ryan was traded to the New York Mets in exchange for Jay Bruce. He finished the year with the Columbia Fireflies. In 41 relief appearances between Lake County and Columbia, he was 3–4 with a 4.14 ERA. In 2018, he began the season with the St. Lucie Mets, where he was named a Florida State League All-Star after posting a 1–0 record, a 1.77 ERA, and a 0.93 WHIP over 16 relief appearances. He was promoted to the Binghamton Rumble Ponies in late May. Over 42 relief appearances between St. Lucie and Binghamton, he went 4–3 with a 3.23 ERA and a 1.06 WHIP. Ryan, now ranked the Mets' #23 prospect on MLB Pipeline, returned to Binghamton in 2019, going 3–1 with a 3.05 ERA and 40 strikeouts over 44 1/3 innings. He did not play in a game in 2020 due to the cancellation of the minor league season because of the COVID-19 pandemic.

=== Texas Rangers ===
On December 18, 2020, Ryan was traded to the Texas Rangers as the player to be named later in the Todd Frazier trade on August 31. For the 2021 season, Ryan was assigned to the Round Rock Express with whom he went 2–7 with a 5.60 ERA and 55 strikeouts over 45 innings pitched in relief. He opened the 2022 season back with Round Rock improving to a 3.64 ERA with 67 strikeouts in 59 1/3 relief innings. He elected free agency following the season on November 10.

=== Seattle Mariners ===
On December 19, 2022, Ryan signed a minor league contract with the Seattle Mariners. He was assigned to the Triple-A Tacoma Rainiers, where he pitched in 16 games with a 4.58 ERA and 15 strikeouts in 17 2/3 innings of work. On June 3, Ryan exercised an opt-out clause in his contract and was released by the Mariners. He re-signed with the team on a new minor league contract on June 5. On August 3, he was selected to the 40-man roster and immediately optioned back to Tacoma. On August 8, Ryan was promoted to the major leagues for the first time. On August 11, Ryan pitched the 8th inning of 9–2 win over the Baltimore Orioles, with two strikeouts and a walk in his MLB debut. After that one appearance with the Mariners, he was optioned back to Triple-A. On November 6, Ryan was removed from the 40-man roster and sent outright to Triple-A, but he elected minor league free agency.

=== Pittsburgh Pirates ===
On December 11, 2023, Ryan signed a minor league contract with the Pittsburgh Pirates. On March 25, 2024, the Pirates announced that Ryan made the Opening Day roster. He notched his first MLB win in a 7–2 victory over the Miami Marlins on March 29, going 1 2/3 innings with two strikeouts and stranding two runners inherited from starter Martin Perez. Ryan made 13 appearances for the Pirates, with a 5.29 ERA with 16 strikeouts across 17 innings of work. He was designated for assignment by Pittsburgh on July 30. Ryan cleared waivers and was sent outright to the Triple-A Indianapolis Indians on August 2. On August 12, the Pirates selected Ryan's contract, adding him back to their active roster. He was designated for assignment a second time on August 19. Ryan cleared waivers and returned to Indianapolis via an outright assignment on August 21. He elected free agency on October 1.

On January 20, 2025, Ryan re-signed with the Pirates organization on a minor league contract. He made 42 appearances (three starts) for Indianapolis, with an 8–1 record, 4.73 ERA, and 61 strikeouts across 72 1/3 innings pitched. He elected free agency following the season on November 6.

=== Los Angeles Dodgers ===
On January 28, 2026, Ryan signed a minor league contract with the Los Angeles Dodgers and was assigned to the Oklahoma City Comets. He appeared in 26 games, 11 of them starts, and had a 3–5 record and 5.19 ERA with 58 strikeouts. He elected free agency on November 2.

== International career ==
On July 2, 2021, Ryan was named to the roster for the United States national baseball team for the 2020 Summer Olympics, contested in 2021 in Tokyo. The team won the silver medal, losing to Japan in the final. Ryan allowed no earned runs across four appearances in the tournament and earned the win in the semifinal game against South Korea.

== Personal life ==
Ryan's younger brother, River, plays for the Detroit Tigers. They played high school baseball together. They have three other siblings. Their father played in Triple-A, and their uncle Jason pitched for the Minnesota Twins. Their father coached them in high school.

Ryan and his wife have two children.
