= Masato Morishita =

Japanese baseball player (born 1997)

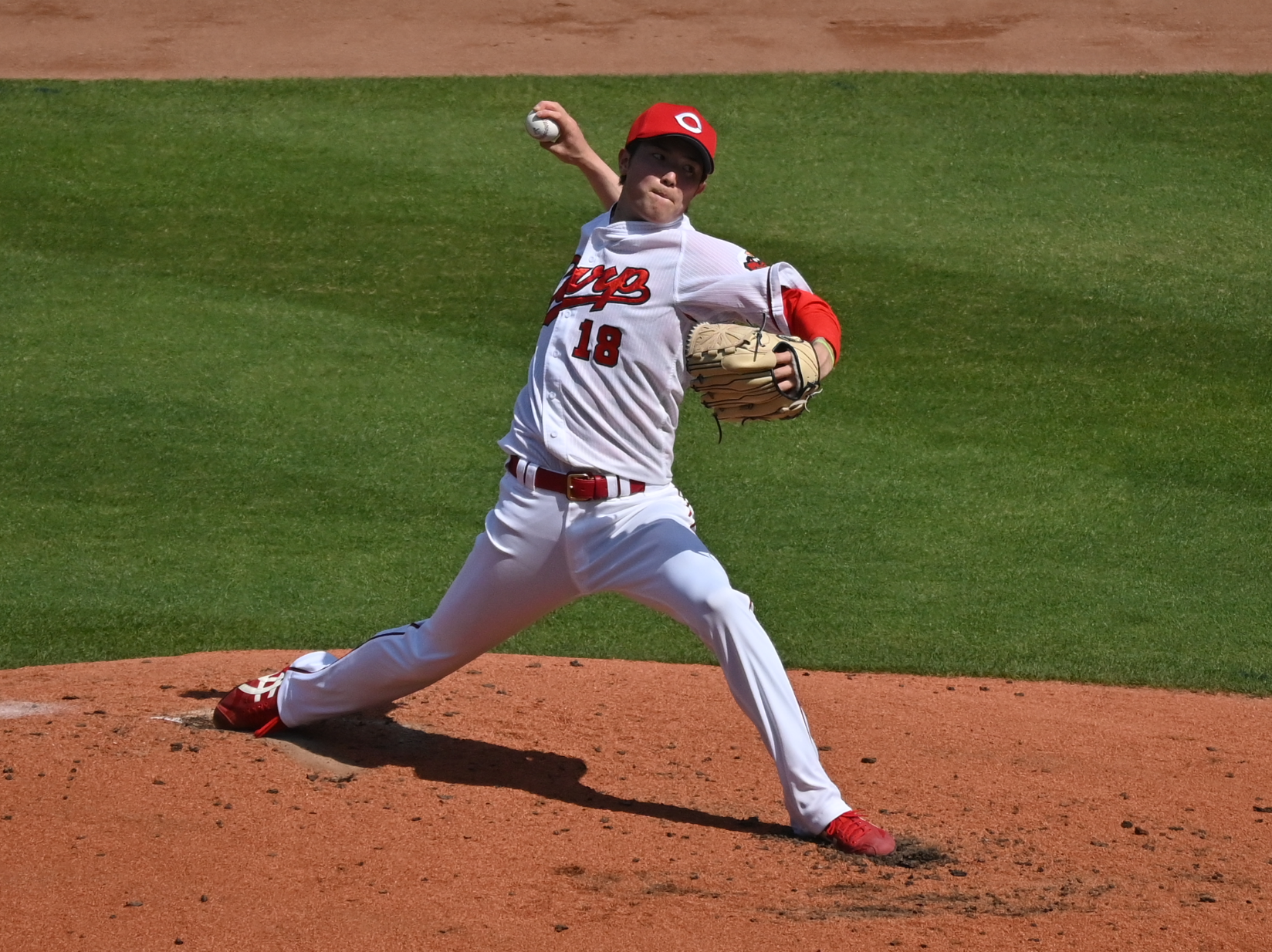
- Morishita in 2022

Hiroshima Toyo Carp – No. 18
- Pitcher
- Born: August 25, 1997 (age 28); Ōita, Ōita, Japan
- Bats: Right Throws: Right

NPB debut
- June 21, 2020, for the Hiroshima Toyo Carp

NPB statistics (through 2025 season)
- Win–loss record: 53–48
- Earned run average: 2.72
- Strikeouts: 673
- Stats at Baseball Reference

Teams
- Hiroshima Toyo Carp (2020–present)

Career highlights and awards
- 2020 Central League Rookie of the Year; 2× NPB All-Star (2021, 2022)
Medals
Men's baseball
Representing Japan
Summer Olympics
Gold medal – first place	2020 Tokyo	Team
U-18 Baseball World Cup
Silver medal – second place	2015 Osaka	Team

Masato Morishita (森下 暢仁, Morishita Masato; born August 25, 1997) is a Japanese professional baseball pitcher for the Hiroshima Toyo Carp of Nippon Professional Baseball (NPB).

== Early baseball career ==
He started playing little league baseball in 3rd grade for Meijikita Elementary School. He continued to play for Daito Junior High where they made it all the way to national tournaments in his 3rd year.

Thinking of playing more baseball just for fun, he and most of his teammates entered Oita Commercial High School. He doubled as a pitcher and 3rd baseman/shortstop and had a friendly rivalry with Hikaru Kawase (Softbank player) for those positions. While they made it to the Koshien nationals in his first year, he didn't get any play time during those matches, and his school never made past the prefectural tournaments in the succeeding years. Nevertheless, he was selected to play for the national team for the 2015 U-18 Baseball World Cup where Japan finished second.

He then joined Meiji University where he became a regular in the lineup as they played in Tokyo Big Six tournaments. He became the ace pitcher and helped his team win the 2019 National Collegiate Baseball Championship. He was also selected to play for Samurai Japan in the Baseball at the 2017 Summer Universiade where Japan finished first, the 2018 Haarlem Baseball Week, and the yearly USA vs Japan Collegiate All-Star Series. He finished college with a 2.78 ERA, and a 13–9 record in 35 league appearances.

== Hiroshima Tōyō Carp ==
He was the Hiroshima Carp's pick in the first round of the 2019 Nippon Professional Baseball draft. He signed a 100 million yen contract with them plus a 50 million yen signing bonus, for an estimated annual salary of 16 million yen. He was assigned the jersey no. 18.

2020

His performance during the pre-season games earned him a spot in the starting rotation, and he debuted on the opening card against the Baystars on June 21, the team's third match in a pandemic-shortened season. Despite pitching 7 scoreless innings, he didn't earn the win as the opponent scored against the relievers who took over. He went the distance and notched his first win on his next outing on June 28, where he almost pitched a complete shutout against the Dragons until he gave away 3 runs on the 9th inning. On August 14, he almost singlehandedly pitched a perfect game against the Tigers with only 2 hits allowed in 9 innings, no walks and 12 KOs. He notched his 10th win on November 1, a feat last achieved by a rookie Carp pitcher in 2014 (Daichi Osera).

He finished 10–3 out of 18 outings, topped the team in winning percentage (0.769), and second ERA in league with 1.91 and 3rd in strikeouts with 124. He is the first CL starter rookie to record an ERA under 2 since Yusuke Nomura in 2012, and the first one in 54 years to record double digit wins with an ERA under 2 since Giants pitcher Tsuneo Horiuchi in 1966. Post-season, he received a 27 million raise which brought his annual salary to 43 million yen. On December 17, he won the CL rookie of the year award, the first Carp rookie to do so since Daichi Osera in 2014.

Morishita was named an NPB All-Star for the second time in his career in 2022.

== National team ==
On July 31, 2021, Morishita debuted with Samurai Japan's top team during the 2020 Summer Olympics held in Tokyo, Japan. He was the starting pitcher for the Opening Round match of Group A against Mexico. He pitched 5 innings (68 pitches total), allowing 5 hits, 2 earned runs and struck out 3. Japan won the match 7–4 and Morishita made quite an impression on the opposing team.

Gold Medal Match

After his good initial performance in the olympic tournament, Morishita was trusted by manager Atsunori Inaba to start the Gold Medal Match against the United States of America on August 7, 2021. He went 5 innings again (81 pitches total), allowing 3 hits but no run and striking out 5. Japan won the match 2–0 and Morishita won an Olympic gold medal, the first in Samurai Japan history, along with his teammates.
