= Luis Castillo (pitcher, born 1995) =

Dominican baseball player (born 1995)

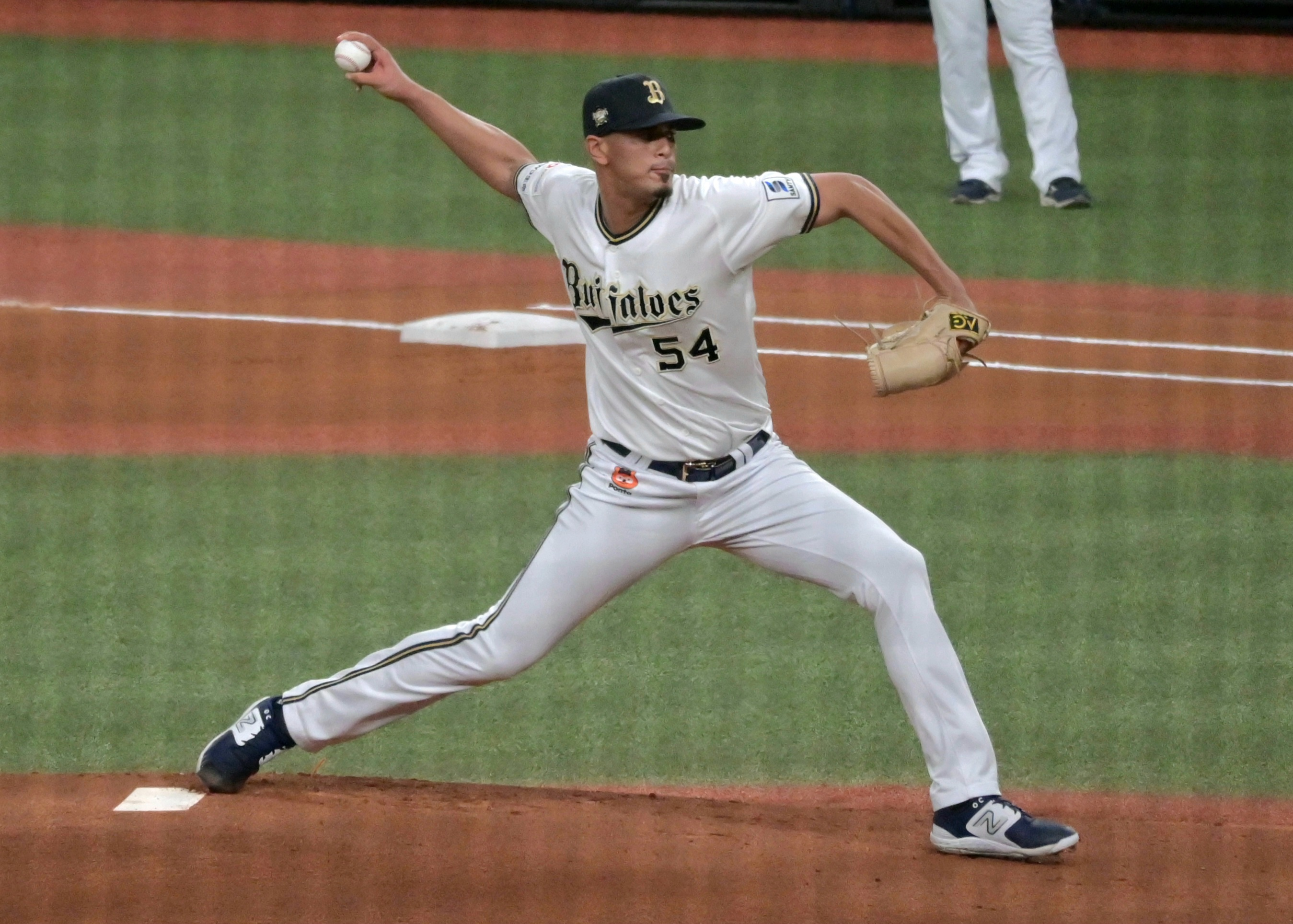
- Castillo with the Orix Buffaloes in 2024

Free agent
- Pitcher
- Born: March 10, 1995 (age 31); Fantino, Dominican Republic
- Bats: Right Throws: Right

Professional debut
- MLB: August 6, 2022, for the Detroit Tigers
- NPB: March 31, 2023, for the Chiba Lotte Marines

MLB statistics (through 2025 season)
- Win–loss record: 0–0
- Earned run average: 5.06
- Strikeouts: 9

NPB statistics (through 2024 season)
- Win–loss record: 6–8
- Earned run average: 3.01
- Strikeouts: 108
- Stats at Baseball Reference

Teams
- Detroit Tigers (2022); Chiba Lotte Marines (2023); Orix Buffaloes (2024); Seattle Mariners (2025)
Medals
Men's baseball
Representing Dominican Republic
Olympic Games
Bronze medal – third place	2020 Tokyo	Team

Luis Felipe Castillo (born March 10, 1995) is a Dominican professional baseball pitcher who is a free agent. He has previously played in Major League Baseball (MLB) for the Detroit Tigers and Seattle Mariners and in Nippon Professional Baseball (NPB) for the Chiba Lotte Marines and Orix Buffaloes. He signed with the Arizona Diamondbacks as an international free agent in 2012.

== Career ==
=== Arizona Diamondbacks ===
On February 16, 2012, Castillo signed with the Arizona Diamondbacks as an international free agent. He made his professional debut with the Dominican Summer League Diamondbacks, recording an 0–9 record and 4.48 ERA in 14 starts. He returned to the team the following season and went 4–4 with a 3.58 ERA in 14 starts. For the 2014 season, Castillo played for the rookie-level AZL Diamondbacks, posting a 3–3 record and 4.40 ERA in 15 appearances. The next season, Castillo recorded a 1.83 ERA in 11 games with the team. In 2016, he played for the rookie-level Missoula Osprey, posting an 0–3 record and 4.04 ERA in 19 games. For the 2017 season, Castillo played for the Low-A Hillsboro Hops, registering a 2.91 ERA with 35 strikeouts in 34.0 innings of work. He split the 2018 season between the Single-A Kane County Cougars, Hillsboro, and Missoula, accumulating a 2.41 ERA in 24 appearances between the three teams. In 2019, Castillo played tor the High-A Visalia Rawhide, recording a 9–0 record and 3.81 ERA in 43 appearances.

Castillo did not play in a game in 2020 due to the cancellation of the minor league season because of the COVID-19 pandemic. He was assigned to the Double-A Amarillo Sod Poodles to begin the 2021 season before receiving a promotion to the Triple-A Reno Aces in June. Castillo finished the year with a cumulative 4.72 ERA in 29 appearances between the two affiliates. He elected minor league free agency following the season on November 7, 2021.

=== Detroit Tigers ===
On February 1, 2022, Castillo signed a minor league contract with the Detroit Tigers organization. He was assigned to the Triple-A Toledo Mud Hens to begin the season. On August 6, the Tigers selected Castillo to their 40-man roster and promoted him to the major leagues for the first time. He made his major league debut that night. Castillo made 3 scoreless appearances for Detroit, striking out 4 over 3 2/3 innings of work. On November 10, Castillo was removed from the 40-man roster and sent outright to the Triple-A Toledo; he elected free agency the same day.

=== Chiba Lotte Marines ===
On December 16, 2022, Castillo signed with the Chiba Lotte Marines of Nippon Professional Baseball (NPB). In 12 appearances for the Marines in 2023, he compiled a 3–3 record and 3.12 ERA with 34 strikeouts across 49 innings of work. Castillo became a free agent after 2023 season.

=== Orix Buffaloes ===
On January 16, 2024, Castillo signed with the Orix Buffaloes of NPB. In 15 appearances for the Buffaloes, he had a 3–5 record and 2.96 ERA with 74 strikeouts across 94 1/3 innings pitched. Castillo became a free agent after the season.

=== Seattle Mariners ===
On January 28, 2025, Castillo signed a minor league contract with the Seattle Mariners that included an invitation to spring training. On April 4, the Mariners selected Castillo's contract, adding him to their active roster. He was nicknamed "The Pebble," a reference to teammate Luis Castillo's nickname of "La Piedra," Spanish for "The Rock." In two starts for Seattle, Castillo struggled to a 7.71 ERA with five strikeouts over seven innings. On April 10, the Mariners optioned him down to the Triple-A Tacoma Rainiers. Castillo was designated for assignment by the Mariners on May 6.

=== Baltimore Orioles ===
On May 7, 2025, the Mariners traded Castillo to Baltimore Orioles in exchange for cash considerations. After two rehabilitation starts for the rookie-level Florida Complex League Orioles, Castillo was designated for assignment on June 29. He cleared waivers and was sent outright to the Triple-A Norfolk Tides on July 7. Castillo elected free agency on October 1. After playing one game for the Aguilas Cibaenas of the Dominican Winter League, Castillo temporarily joined the Diablos Rojos del México during the 2026 Baseball Champions League Americas.

=== Diablos Rojos del México ===
On March 25, 2026, Castillo signed with the Diablos Rojos del México of the Mexican League. In five starts for the Diablos, he posted a 2–1 record with a 4.15 ERA and 17 strikeouts across 21 1/3 innings. On June 10, Castillo was released by the Diablos.

== International career ==
Castillo played for the Dominican Republic national baseball team in the 2020 Summer Olympics, contested in 2021. He was 1–1 with a 6.75 ERA in five relief appearances.
