= Jamie Westbrook =

American baseball player (born 1995)

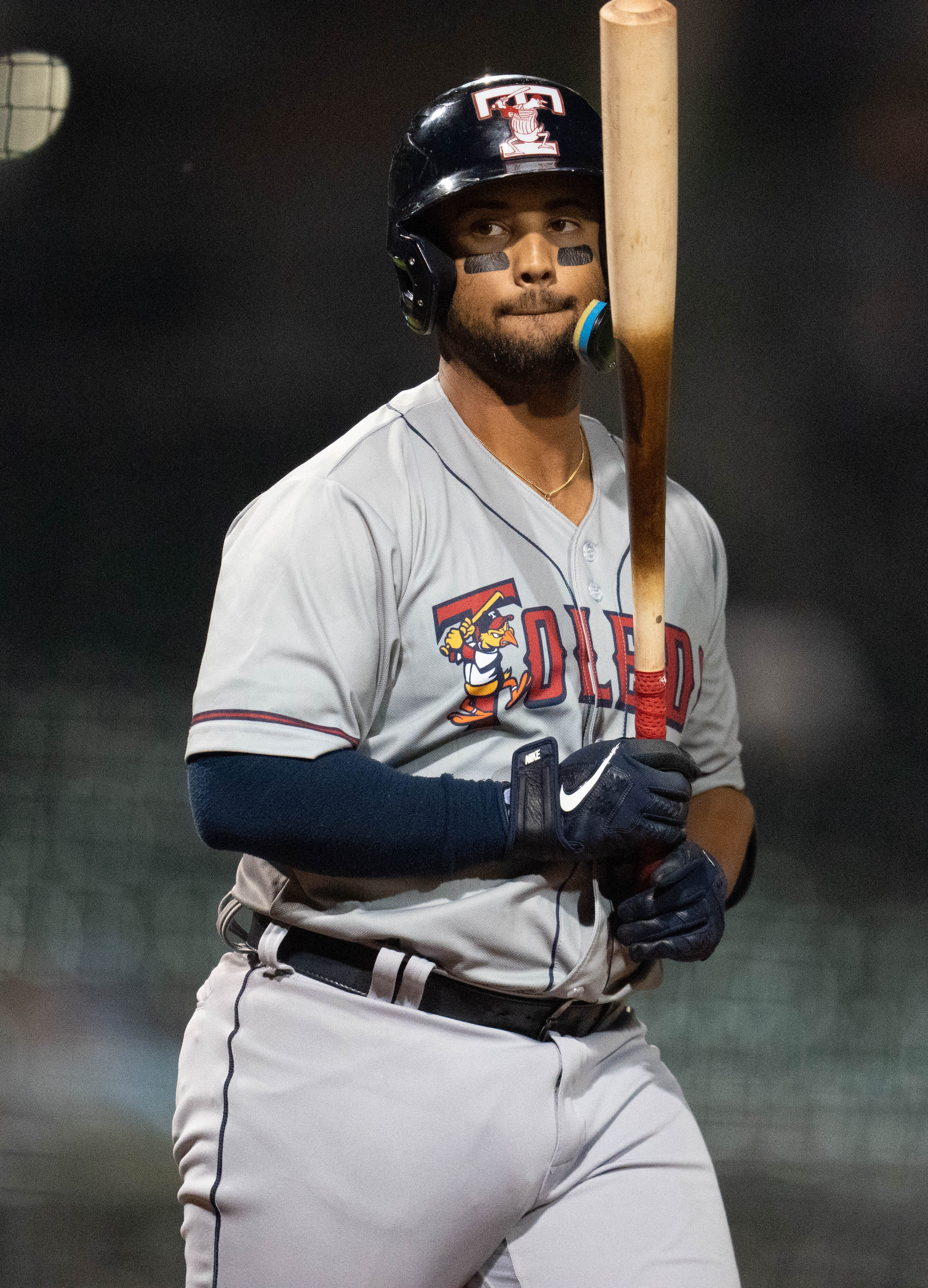
- Westbrook with the Toledo Mud Hens in 2022

Free agent
- Outfielder / Second baseman
- Born: June 18, 1995 (age 31); Springfield, Massachusetts, U.S.
- Bats: Right Throws: Right

MLB debut
- June 2, 2024, for the Boston Red Sox

MLB statistics (through 2024 season)
- Batting average: .150
- Home runs: 2
- Runs batted in: 7
- Stats at Baseball Reference

Teams
- Boston Red Sox (2024)
Medals
Men's baseball
Representing United States
Olympic Games
| Silver medal – second place | 2020 Tokyo | Team |

Jamie Vaughn Westbrook (born June 18, 1995) is an American professional baseball outfielder and second baseman who is a free agent. He has previously played in Major League Baseball (MLB) for the Boston Red Sox. He was drafted by the Arizona Diamondbacks in the fifth round of the 2013 MLB draft. He played for the United States national baseball team in the 2020 Summer Olympics.

== Early life and amateur career ==
Westbrook was born in Springfield, Massachusetts and spent the first ten years of his life in Holyoke, Massachusetts, before moving to Chandler, Arizona. He attended Basha High School. As a junior, he batted .532 with 35 RBIs and 13 home runs. Westbrook hit .434 with 16 total extra-base hits and six home runs in his senior season. Westbrook had committed to play college baseball at Pepperdine University before he signed with the Diamondbacks.

== Professional career ==
=== Arizona Diamondbacks ===
The Arizona Diamondbacks selected Westbrook in the fifth round, with the 150th overall selection, of the 2013 Major League Baseball draft. He made his professional debut with the Arizona League Diamondbacks, and also appeared for the rookie-level Missoula Osprey. In 2014, Westbrook played for the Single-A South Bend Silver Hawks, hitting .259/.314/.375 with eight home runs and 49 RBI. The following season, Westbrook played for the High-A Visalia Rawhide, where he batted .319/.357/.510 with career-highs in home runs (17) and RBI (72). For the 2016 season, Westbrook played for the Double-A Mobile BayBears, logging a .262/.312/.349 slash line with five home runs and 36 RBI. In 2017, Westbrook played for the Double-A Jackson Generals, where he slashed .265/.305/.395 with eight home runs and 55 RBI in 104 games.

In 2018, Westbrook was named a Southern League All-Star after batting .287 with 15 home runs and was promoted to the Triple-A Reno Aces, where he hit .391 with four home runs in seven games. He returned to Jackson to start the 2019 season and repeated as a Southern League All-Star and was again promoted to Reno. In 128 games between the two affiliates, Westbrook slashed .281/.358/.451 with 16 home runs and 77 RBI. He elected free agency following the season on November 4, 2019.

=== San Francisco Giants ===
On January 6, 2020, Westbrook signed a minor league contract with the San Francisco Giants organization. Westbrook did not play in a game in 2020 due to the cancellation of the minor league season because of the COVID-19 pandemic. Westbrook was released by the Giants organization on June 26.

=== Sugar Land Lightning Sloths ===
In July 2020, Westbrook signed on to play for the Sugar Land Lightning Sloths of the Constellation Energy League, a makeshift four-team independent league created as a result of the COVID-19 pandemic, for the 2020 season. Westbrook hit .294/.347/.553 with five home runs and 18 RBI in 27 games, and was named the MVP of his team after the season.

=== Milwaukee Brewers ===
On November 2, 2020, Westrook signed a minor league contract with the Milwaukee Brewers organization. He was assigned to the Triple-A Nashville Sounds to start the 2021 season, but was later reassigned to the Double-A Biloxi Shuckers before being promoted back to Triple-A.

=== Detroit Tigers ===
On April 13, 2022, the Brewers traded Westbrook to the Detroit Tigers in exchange for cash considerations. He played in 120 games for the Triple-A Toledo Mud Hens, slashing .248/.349/.377 with 11 home runs and 48 RBI. Westbrook elected free agency following the season on November 10.

=== New York Yankees ===
On December 15, 2022, Westbrook signed a minor-league contract with the New York Yankees. In 117 games for the Triple–A Scranton/Wilkes-Barre RailRiders, he hit .294/.400/.496 with 21 home runs and 65 RBI. Westbrook elected free agency following the season on November 6, 2023.

=== Boston Red Sox ===
On December 11, 2023, Westbrook signed a minor league contract with the Boston Red Sox. He was named a non-roster invitee to the team's spring training camp. He began the 2024 season with the Triple–A Worcester Red Sox, posting a .267/.364/.436 slash line with five home runs and 29 RBI across 49 appearances. On June 2, Westbrook was selected to the 40-man roster and promoted to the major leagues for the first time. He made his MLB debut that day, and walked in his first plate appearance. On June 5, Westbrook pinch-hit for Enmanuel Valdez in the eighth inning of the Red Sox' 9–0 win against the Atlanta Braves, and recorded his first major league hit, a single, off Braves pitcher Jimmy Herget. He hit his first major league home run the next day in the 7th inning of the Red Sox's 14–2 win against the Chicago White Sox, off White Sox pitcher Jared Shuster, who is also a Massachusetts native. On June 17, the Red Sox sent Westbrook to Triple-A Worcester to make room for infielder Romy González who was activated from the injured list. In 21 games for Boston, he slashed .150/.234/.350 with two home runs and seven RBI. On August 12, Westbrook was designated for assignment following the promotions of Chase Shugart and Mickey Gasper. He cleared waivers and was sent outright to Worcester on August 15. Westbrook elected free agency on November 2.

=== Tampa Bay Rays ===
On February 24, 2025, Westbrook signed a minor league contract with the Tampa Bay Rays. He made 116 appearances for the Triple-A Durham Bulls, batting .266/.350/.401 with seven home runs and 49 RBI. Westbrook elected free agency following the season on November 6.

== International career ==
On July 2, 2021, Westbrook was named to the roster for the United States national baseball team for the 2020 Summer Olympics, contested in 2021 in Tokyo. The team went on to win silver, falling to Japan in the gold-medal game.
