= Lavern =

Lavern is a given name. Notable people with the name include:

- Lavern Ahlstrom, retired provincial level politician and former leader of the Alberta Social Credit Party
- LaVern Baker (1929–1997), American R&B singer
  - LaVern (album), 1956 album by LaVern Baker
- Alan LaVern Bean (1932–2018), American former naval officer and aviator, the fourth person to walk on the Moon
- Lavern Corbin, American basketball player who was an NCAA All-American as a senior at Cal in 1929
- LaVern Dilweg (1903–1968), professional football player, attorney, and U.S. Congressman from Wisconsin
- Lavern Eve (born 1965), female track and field athlete from the Bahamas who competes in the javelin throw
- Edward Lavern Johnstone (born 1954), retired Canadian ice hockey player
- Ryan Lavern (born 1987), American professional baseball player in the Atlanta Braves organization
- LaVern W. Parmley (1900–1980), the fifth general president of the Primary of The Church of Jesus Christ of Latter-day Saints (LDS Church)
- Lavern Roach (1925–1950), boxer from Texas who was Ring Magazine's Rookie-of-the-Year in 1947
- Lavern Spencer (born 1984), Saint Lucian high jumper
- LaVern Torgeson (1929–2015), American football linebacker

== See also ==
- LaVern Gibson Championship Cross Country Course, in Terre Haute, Indiana was dedicated October 17, 1997
- La Vergne (disambiguation)
- Lavergne (disambiguation)
- Laverna
- Laverne (disambiguation)
- Lavernhe
- Lavernia (disambiguation)
