= 2011 Boston Red Sox season =

Major League Baseball season

2011 Boston Red Sox
- League: American League
- Division: East
- Ballpark: Fenway Park
- City: Boston, Massachusetts
- Record: 90–72 (.556)
- Divisional place: 3rd
- Owners: John W. Henry (Fenway Sports Group)
- President: Larry Lucchino
- General manager: Theo Epstein
- Manager: Terry Francona
- Television: NESN (Don Orsillo, Jerry Remy)
- Radio: Boston Red Sox Radio Network (Joe Castiglione, Dave O'Brien, Jon Rish, Dale Arnold)
- Stats: ESPN.com; Baseball Reference

The 2011 Boston Red Sox season was the 111th season in the franchise's Major League Baseball history. Before the season, the Red Sox were favored to win the American League East and reach the World Series, with some comparing the team to the 1927 New York Yankees. With a record of 90–72, the Red Sox finished third in their division, seven games behind the Yankees.

The club led the Tampa Bay Rays by nine games in the AL wild card race on September 3. Boston's odds of reaching the postseason peaked at 99.6%, but the Red Sox lost 18 of their final 24 games. On the last day of the season, September 28, a ninth-inning Red Sox loss to the Baltimore Orioles via a blown save, coupled with an improbable late comeback from a 7–0 deficit in 12 innings by the Rays over the Yankees, made the Rays the AL wild card winners and eliminated the Red Sox from playoff contention.

== Offseason ==
=== November ===
- 11/04/10-Detroit Tigers traded Brent Dlugach to Boston Red Sox.
- 11/07/10-3B Adrián Beltré elected to free agency.
- LF Bill Hall elected to free agency.
- 2B Felipe López elected to free agent.
- C Víctor Martínez elected to free agency.
- C Jason Varitek elected to free agency.
- 11/08/10-Activated RHP Junichi Tazawa from the 60-day disabled list.
- Activated CF Mike Cameron from the 60-day disabled list.
- Activated 1B Kevin Youkilis from the 60-day disabled list.
- Activated LF Jacoby Ellsbury from the 60-day disabled list.
- 11/12/10-Traded LHP Dustin Richardson to the Florida Marlins for LHP Andrew Miller.
- 11/15/10-Claimed RHP Taylor Buchholz off waivers from Toronto Blue Jays.
- 11/19/10-Called up Luis Exposito from Portland Sea Dogs.
- Called up Stolmy Pimentel from Salem Red Sox.
- Called up Óscar Tejeda from Salem Red Sox.
- 11/24/10-Claimed Jordan Parraz off waivers from Kansas City Royals.

=== December ===
- 12/03/10-2B Nate Spears assigned to Boston Red Sox.
- RHP Santo Luis assigned to Boston Red Sox.
- LHP Hideki Okajima elected free agency.
- RHP Taylor Buchholz elected free agency.
- LHP Andrew Miller elected free agency.
- Signed free agent RHP Jason Bergmann.
- Signed free agent RHP Brandon Duckworth.
- Signed free agent 2B Drew Sutton.
- 12/06/10-Portland Sea Dogs traded 1B Anthony Rizzo and RHP Casey Kelly to San Antonio Missions; San Diego Padres traded 1B Adrián González to Boston Red Sox and Greenville Drive traded CF Reymond Fuentes to Fort Wayne TinCaps.
- 12/10/10-Signed free agent C Jason Varitek.
- 12/11/10-Signed free agent LF Carl Crawford.
- 12/16/10-Traded CF Eric Patterson to San Diego Padres.
- Signed free agent LHP Andrew Miller.
- Signed free agent RHP Clevelan Santeliz.
- Signed free agent LHP Randy Williams.
- Signed free agent LHP Rich Hill.
- Signed free agent LHP Lenny DiNardo.
- Signed free agent LHP Matt Albers.
- 12/18/10-Signed free agent RHP Dan Wheeler.
- 12/21/10-Designated SS Brent Dlugach for assignment.
- Signed free agent RHP Bobby Jenks.
- 12/23/10-Outrighted Brent Dlugach to Pawtucket Red Sox.

=== January ===
- 1/05/11-Designated Matt Fox for assignment.
- Claimed Max Ramírez off waivers from Texas Rangers.
- 1/06/11-Signed free agent RHP Tony Peña Jr.
- 1/10/11-Signed free agent LHP Hideki Okajima.
- 1/13/11-Released RHP Matt Fox.

== 2011 spring training ==
Fans gathered at Fenway Park on February 8, 2011, in order to kick off the Red Sox preseason by celebrating Truck Day. The first full team workout of the preseason took place on February 19. Playing other teams in the Grapefruit League the Red Sox finished with 14 wins and 19 losses.

== 2011 season ==
The Red Sox made several high-profile roster moves hoping to return to postseason success after missing the playoffs in 2010. During the offseason the Red Sox traded for first baseman Adrián González, and they followed that move up by signing star outfielder Carl Crawford.

=== Opening day ===
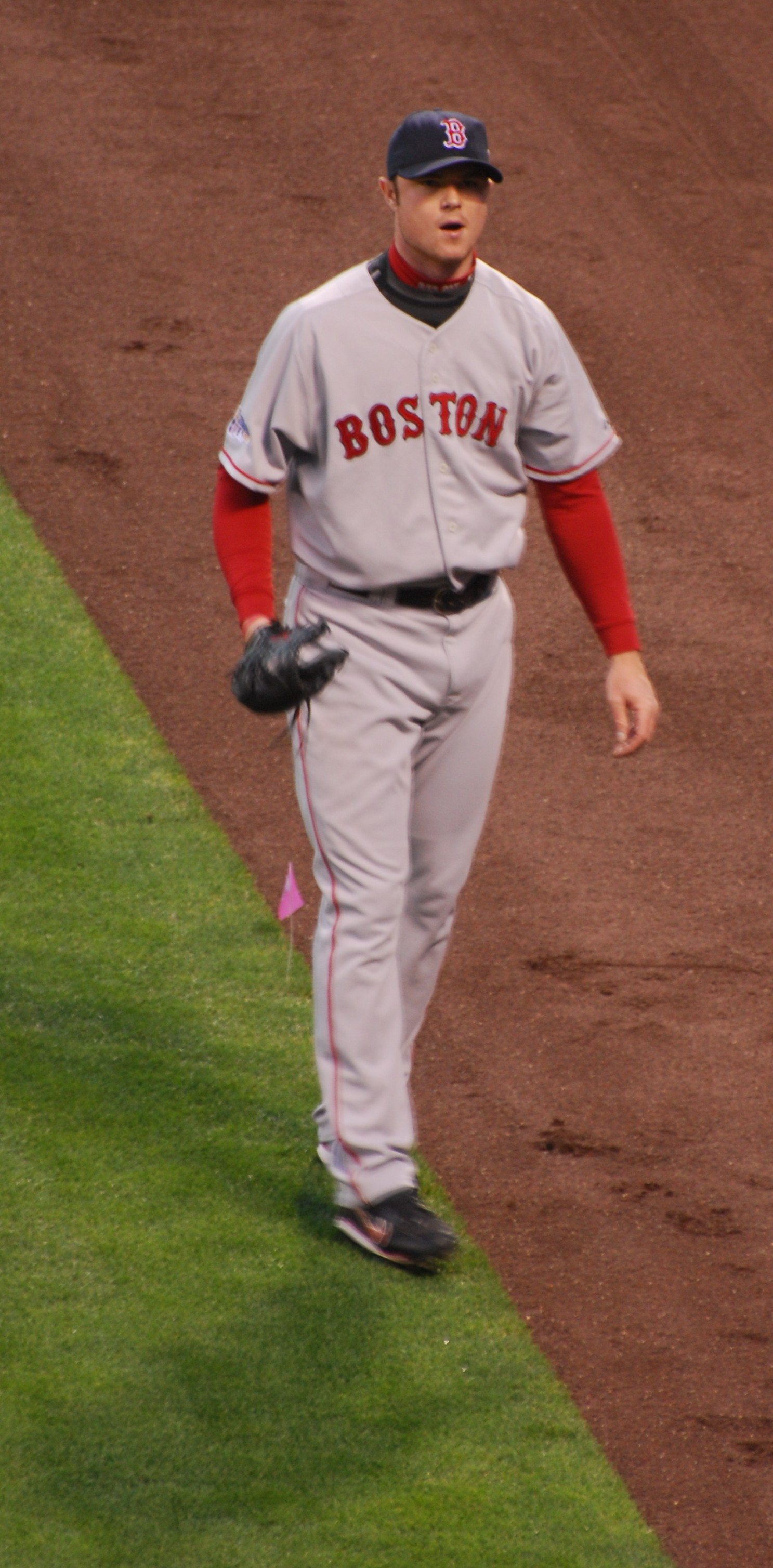
Opening Day starter Jon Lester

The Red Sox kicked off the year against the defending AL Pennant Winners, the Texas Rangers in Arlington, Texas, on Friday, April 1.

==== Lineup ====
2	Jacoby Ellsbury	CF
15	Dustin Pedroia	2B
13	Carl Crawford	LF
20	Kevin Youkilis	3B
28	Adrián González	1B
34	David Ortiz	DH
23	Mike Cameron	RF
39	Jarrod Saltalamacchia	C
10	Marco Scutaro	SS
31	Jon Lester	P

The Red Sox home opener was Friday, April 8, against the rival New York Yankees.

=== Pitching woes ===
On May 15, John Lackey and Daisuke Matsuzaka were placed on the disabled list. On June 10, Matsuzaka underwent season-ending Tommy John surgery. Clay Buchholz was afflicted with what would be diagnosed as a stress fracture in his back and was also put on the disabled list on June 17, where he would remain for the rest of the season. Other pitchers including Rich Hill and Bobby Jenks spent significant time on the disabled list. The Red Sox obtained Érik Bédard from the Seattle Mariners seconds before the trading deadline, after Kyle Weiland (who was highlighted by his ejection on his MLB debut) proved ineffective. Starting pitchers John Lackey and ace Jon Lester were ineffective down the stretch, as the Red Sox crashed down to a 7-20 finish, blowing a 9-game wild card lead that they held entering September. Josh Beckett missed a start early in the month after spraining his ankle in a previous start, and was ineffective in most of his September starts after that point.

=== Collapse ===
The Red Sox became the first team in the history of Major League Baseball to have a nine-game lead in September (a nine-game lead in the AL Wild Card race over the Tampa Bay Rays which peaked on September 3, 2011) and fail to make the playoffs that season, thanks to their 7–20 record in the final month of the regular season. In the days following this historic collapse, the front office and manager Terry Francona decided to part ways, and not exercise either of the additional year options on Francona's contract.

After the regular season ended, General Manager Theo Epstein entered talks with the Chicago Cubs to interview for the National League club's vacant General Manager position. The Cubs offered Epstein the position of President of Baseball Operations, and he accepted. After five months of negotiations, the Red Sox and Cubs agreed to the compensation the Red Sox would receive for Epstein. The Cubs acquired minor-league first baseman Jair Bogaerts (twin brother of Xander Bogaerts) from the Red Sox, and the Red Sox received pitchers Chris Carpenter and Aaron Kurcz.

Soon after the season ended, stories broke in the local media about several of Boston's starting pitchers, including Jon Lester, Josh Beckett, and John Lackey, had been playing video games, eating fried chicken, and drinking beer in the clubhouse and dugout during games when they were not pitching. Jon Lester was the first to speak publicly about the allegations, and admitted to eating and drinking in the clubhouse during games, though infrequently, but denied that these actions ever took place in the dugout.

=== 2011 roster ===
2011 Boston Red Sox
**Roster**
**Pitchers**: 91 Alfredo Aceves; 32 Matt Albers; 48 Scott Atchison; 51 Daniel Bard; 19 Josh Beckett; 23 Érik Bédard; 64 Michael Bowden; 11 Clay Buchholz; 61 Félix Doubront; 53 Rich Hill; 68 Tommy Hottovy; 52 Bobby Jenks; 41 John Lackey; 31 Jon Lester; 18 Daisuke Matsuzaka; 30 Andrew Miller; 56 Trever Miller; 46 Franklin Morales; 37 Hideki Okajima; 58 Jonathan Papelbon; 59 Dennys Reyes; 63 Junichi Tazawa; 49 Tim Wakefield; 70 Kyle Weiland; 35 Dan Wheeler; 43 Randy Williams	**Catchers**: 60 Ryan Lavarnway; 39 Jarrod Saltalamacchia; 33 Jason Varitek; **Infielders**: 62 Lars Anderson; 3 Mike Avilés; 28 Adrián González; 68,76 José Iglesias; 12 Jed Lowrie; 60 Yamaico Navarro; 34 David Ortiz; 15 Dustin Pedroia; 10 Marco Scutaro; 71 Nate Spears; 44 Drew Sutton; 20 Kevin Youkilis	**Outfielders**: 23 Mike Cameron; 13 Carl Crawford; 7 J. D. Drew; 2 Jacoby Ellsbury; 55 Joey Gathright; 36 Conor Jackson; 54 Darnell McDonald; 16 Josh Reddick	**Manager**: 47 Terry Francona; **Coaches**: 17 Tim Bogar (third base); 22 DeMarlo Hale (bench); 50 Ron Johnson (first base); 29 Dave Magadan (hitting); 57 Gary Tuck (bullpen); 40 Curt Young (pitching)

=== Season standings ===
==== American League East ====
AL East
Team	W	L	Pct.	GB	Home	Road
New York Yankees	97	65	.599	—	52‍–‍29	45‍–‍36
Tampa Bay Rays	91	71	.562	6	47‍–‍34	44‍–‍37
Boston Red Sox	90	72	.556	7	45‍–‍36	45‍–‍36
Toronto Blue Jays	81	81	.500	16	42‍–‍39	39‍–‍42
Baltimore Orioles	69	93	.426	28	39‍–‍42	30‍–‍51

==== American League Wild Card ====
Division winners
Team	W	L	Pct.
New York Yankees	97	65	.599
Texas Rangers	96	66	.593
Detroit Tigers	95	67	.586

Wild Card team (Top team qualifies for postseason)
Team	W	L	Pct.	GB
Tampa Bay Rays	91	71	.562	—
Boston Red Sox	90	72	.556	1
Los Angeles Angels	86	76	.531	5
Toronto Blue Jays	81	81	.500	10
Cleveland Indians	80	82	.494	11
Chicago White Sox	79	83	.488	12
Oakland Athletics	74	88	.457	17
Kansas City Royals	71	91	.438	20
Baltimore Orioles	69	93	.426	22
Seattle Mariners	67	95	.414	24
Minnesota Twins	63	99	.389	28

=== Record vs. opponents ===
2011 American League record Source: MLB Standings Grid – 2011
Team	BAL	BOS	CWS	CLE	DET	KC	LAA	MIN	NYY	OAK	SEA	TB	TEX	TOR	NL
Baltimore	–	8–10	4–4	2–5	5–5	5–4	3–6	6–2	5–13	4–5	4–2	9–9	1–5	6–12	7–11
Boston	10–8	–	2–4	4–6	5–1	5–3	6–2	5–2	12–6	6–2	5–4	6–12	4–6	10–8	10–8
Chicago	4–4	4–2	–	11–7	5–13	7–11	2–6	9–9	2–6	6–4	7–2	4–4	4–4	3–4	11–7
Cleveland	5–2	6–4	7–11	–	6–12	12–6	3–6	11–7	3–4	5–2	5–4	2–4	1–9	3–4	11–7
Detroit	5–5	1–5	13–5	12–6	–	11–7	3–4	14–4	4–3	5–5	4–6	6–1	6–3	4–2	7–11
Kansas City	4–5	3–5	11–7	6–12	7–11	–	7–3	8–10	3–3	4–5	5–3	2–5	2–6	4–3	5–13
Los Angeles	6–3	2–6	6–2	6–3	4–3	3–7	–	6–3	4–5	8–11	12–7	4–4	7–12	5–5	13–5
Minnesota	2–6	2–5	9–9	7–11	4–14	10–8	3–6	–	2–6	4–4	3–5	3–7	5–3	1–5	8–10
New York	13–5	6–12	6–2	4–3	3–4	3–3	5–4	6–2	–	6–3	5–4	9–9	7–2	11–7	13–5
Oakland	5–4	2–6	4–6	2–5	5–5	5–4	11–8	4–4	3–6	–	9–10	5–2	6–13	5–5	8–10
Seattle	2–4	4–5	2–7	4–5	6–4	3–5	7–12	5–3	4–5	10–9	–	4–6	4–15	3–6	9–9
Tampa Bay	9–9	12–6	4–4	4–2	1–6	5–2	4–4	7–3	9–9	2–5	6–4	–	4–5	12–6	12–6
Texas	5–1	6–4	4–4	9–1	3–6	6–2	12–7	3–5	2–7	13–6	15–4	5–4	–	4–6	9–9
Toronto	12–6	8–10	4–3	4–3	2–4	3–4	5–5	5–1	7–11	5–5	6–3	6–12	6–4	–	8–10

- Source: MLB Standings Grid – 2011

Red Sox vs. National League
Team	NL Central							
Team	CHC	CIN	HOU	MIL	PIT	STL	PHI	SDP
**Boston**	2–1	—	3–0	2–1	1–2	—	1–2	1–2

=== Game log ===
Legend
Red Sox Win	Red Sox Loss	Game postponed	Eliminated from Playoff Contention
Boldface text denotes a Red Sox pitcher

2011 Game Log (90–72)
April (11–15)

#	Date	Opponent	Score	Win	Loss	Save	Attendance	Stadium	Record	Boxscore / Streak
1	April 1	@ Rangers	9–5	Oliver (1–0)	**Bard** (0–1)		50,146	Rangers Ballpark	0–1	L1
2	April 2	@ Rangers	12–5	Lewis (1–0)	**Lackey** (0–1)		48,356	Rangers Ballpark	0–2	L2
3	April 3	@ Rangers	5–1	Harrison (1–0)	**Buchholz** (0–1)		46,326	Rangers Ballpark	0–3	L3
4	April 5	@ Indians	3–1	Tomlin (1–0)	**Beckett** (0–1)	Perez (1)	9,025	Progressive Field	0–4	L4
5	April 6	@ Indians	8–4	Perez (1–0)	**Matsuzaka** (0–1)		9,523	Progressive Field	0–5	L5
6	April 7	@ Indians	1–0	Perez (2–0)	**Bard** (0–2)	Perez (2)	10,594	Progressive Field	0–6	L6
7	April 8	Yankees	9–6	**Lackey** (1–1)	Colón (0–1)	**Papelbon** (1)	37,178	**Fenway Park**	1–6	W1
8	April 9	Yankees	9–4	Robertson (2–0)	**Buchholz** (0–2)		37,488	**Fenway Park**	1–7	L1
9	April 10	Yankees	4–0	**Beckett** (1–1)	Sabathia (0–1)		37,861	**Fenway Park**	2–7	W1
10	April 11	Rays	16–5	Hellickson (1–1)	**Matsuzaka** (0–2)		37,568	**Fenway Park**	2–8	L1
11	April 12	Rays	3–2	Price (1–2)	**Lester** (0–1)		37,015	**Fenway Park**	2–9	L2
12	April 13	Rays	Postponed (rain); Makeup: August 16							Rain1
12	April 15	Blue Jays	7–6	Cecil (1–1)	**Jenks** (0–1)	Rauch (3)	37,467	**Fenway Park**	2–10	L3
13	April 16	Blue Jays	4–1	**Beckett** (2–1)	Reyes (0–2)	**Papelbon** (2)	37,310	**Fenway Park**	3–10	W1
14	April 17	Blue Jays	8–1	**Lester** (1–1)	Litsch (1–1)		37,802	**Fenway Park**	4–10	W2
15	April 18	Blue Jays	9–1	**Matsuzaka** (1–2)	Romero (1–2)		37,916	**Fenway Park**	5–10	W3
16	April 19	@ Athletics	5–0	Anderson (1–1)	**Lackey** (1–2)		25,230	McAfee Coliseum	5–11	L1
17	April 20	@ Athletics	5–3	**Buchholz** (1–2)	González (2–1)	**Papelbon** (3)	29,045	McAfee Coliseum	6–11	W1
18	April 21	@ Angels	4–2 (11)	**Jenks** (1–1)	Thompson (0–1)	**Papelbon** (4)	37,003	Angel Stadium	7–11	W2
19	April 22	@ Angels	4–3	**Lester** (2–1)	Haren (4–1)	**Papelbon** (5)	39,005	Angel Stadium	8–11	W3
20	April 23	@ Angels	5–0	**Matsuzaka** (2–2)	Santana (0–3)		40,025	Angel Stadium	9–11	W4
21	April 24	@ Angels	7–0	**Lackey** (2–2)	Palmer (1–1)		35,107	Angel Stadium	10–11	W5
22	April 26	@ Orioles	4–1	Britton (4–1)	**Buchholz** (1–3)	Gregg (3)	18,938	Camden Yards	10–12	L1
23	April 27	@ Orioles	5–4	Uehara (1–0)	**Bard** (0–3)	Gregg (4)	15,514	Camden Yards	10–13	L2
24	April 28	@ Orioles	6–2	**Lester** (3–1)	Johnson (1–1)		21,209	Camden Yards	11–13	W1
25	April 29	Mariners	5–4	Vargas (1–2)	**Jenks** (1–2)	League (6)	37,845	**Fenway Park**	11–14	L1
26	April 30	Mariners	2–0	Fister (2–3)	**Lackey** (2–3)	League (7)	37,901	**Fenway Park**	11–15	L2

May (19–10)

#	Date	Opponent	Score	Win	Loss	Save	Attendance	Stadium	Record	Boxscore / Streak
27	May 1	Mariners	3–2	**Papelbon** (1–0)	Wright (0–1)		37,079	**Fenway Park**	12–15	W1
28	May 2	Angels	9–5	**Buchholz** (2–3)	Weaver (6–1)		37,017	**Fenway Park**	13–15	W2
29	May 3	Angels	7–3	**Lester** (4–1)	Haren (4–2)		37,043	**Fenway Park**	14–15	W3
30	May 4	Angels	5–3 (13)	Bell (1–0)	**Matsuzaka** (2–3)		37,037	**Fenway Park**	14–16	L1
31	May 5	Angels	11–0	Piñeiro (1–0)	**Lackey** (2–4)		37,013	**Fenway Park**	14–17	L2
32	May 6	Twins	9–2	Baker (2–2)	**Wakefield** (0–1)		37,798	**Fenway Park**	14–18	L3
33	May 7	Twins	4–0	**Buchholz** (3–3)	Duensing (2–2)		37,234	**Fenway Park**	15–18	W1
34	May 8	Twins	9–5	**Matsuzaka** (3–3)	Pavano (2–4)		37,526	**Fenway Park**	16–18	W2
35	May 9	Twins	2–1	**Okajima** (1–0)	Hoey (0–1)		37,276	**Fenway Park**	17–18	W3
36	May 10	@ Blue Jays	7–6 (10)	Villanueva (1–0)	**Albers** (0–1)		17,820	Rogers Centre	17–19	L1
37	May 11	@ Blue Jays	9–3	Litsch (4–2)	**Lackey** (2–5)		19,163	Rogers Centre	17–20	L2
38	May 13	@ Yankees	5–4	**Buchholz** (4–3)	Colón (2–2)	**Papelbon** (6)	48,254	Yankee Stadium	18–20	W1
39	May 14	@ Yankees	6–0	**Beckett** (3–1)	Sabathia (3–3)		48,790	Yankee Stadium	19–20	W2
40	May 15	@ Yankees	7–5	**Lester** (5–1)	García (2–3)	**Papelbon** (7)	46,945	Yankee Stadium	20–20	W3
41	May 16	Orioles	8–7	**Aceves** (1–0)	Gregg (0–1)		37,138	**Fenway Park**	21–20	W4
42	May 17	Orioles	Postponed (rain); Makeup: September 19							Rain2
42	May 18	Tigers	1–0	**Bard** (1–3)	Schlereth (0–1)	**Papelbon** (8)	37,311	**Fenway Park**	22–20	W5
43	May 19	Tigers	4–3	**Papelbon** (2–0)	Alburquerque (0–1)		37,660	**Fenway Park**	23–20	W6
44	May 20	Cubs	15–5	**Lester** (6–1)	Davis (0–2)	**Atchison** (1)	37,140	**Fenway Park**	24–20	W7
45	May 21	Cubs	9–3	Marshall (2–0)	**Albers** (0–2)		37,798	**Fenway Park**	24–21	L1
46	May 22	Cubs	5–1	**Wakefield** (1–1)	Russell (1–5)		37,688	**Fenway Park**	25–21	W1
47	May 23	@ Indians	3–2	Smith (2–1)	**Bard** (1–4)	Perez (13)	19,225	Progressive Field	25–22	L1
48	May 24	@ Indians	4–2	**Beckett** (4–1)	Carmona (3–5)	**Papelbon** (9)	23,752	Progressive Field	26–22	W1
49	May 25	@ Indians	14–2	**Lester** (7–1)	Talbot (1–1)		26,408	Progressive Field	27–22	W2
50	May 26	@ Tigers	14–1 (8)	**Aceves** (2–0)	Scherzer (6–2)		24,213	Comerica Park	28–22	W3
51	May 27	@ Tigers	9–3	**Wakefield** (2–1)	Porcello (4–3)		34,046	Comerica Park	29–22	W4
52	May 28	@ Tigers	Postponed (rain); Makeup: May 29							Rain3 Archived October 7, 2012, at the Wayback Machine
52	May 29 (Game 1)	@ Tigers	4–3	**Albers** (1–2)	Valverde (2–2)	**Papelbon** (10)	36,285	Comerica Park	30–22	W5
53	May 29 (Game 2)	@ Tigers	3–0	Verlander (5–3)	**Beckett** (4–2)	Valverde (12)	39,873	Comerica Park	30–23	L1
54	May 30	White Sox	7–3	Peavy (2–0)	**Lester** (7–2)		37,463	**Fenway Park**	30–24	L2
55	May 31	White Sox	10–7	Humber (4–3)	**Aceves** (2–1)	Sale (2)	37,269	**Fenway Park**	30–25	L3

June (16–9)

#	Date	Opponent	Score	Win	Loss	Save	Attendance	Stadium	Record	Boxscore / Streak
56	June 1	White Sox	7–4	Floyd (6–5)	**Albers** (1–3)	Santos (9)	37,321	**Fenway Park**	30–26	L4
57	June 3	Athletics	8–6	**Jenks** (2–2)	Devine (0–1)		37,808	**Fenway Park**	31–26	W1
58	June 4	Athletics	9–8 (14)	**Aceves** (3–1)	Moscoso (2–1)		37,485	**Fenway Park**	32–26	W2
59	June 5	Athletics	6–3	**Lackey** (3–5)	Anderson (3–6)	**Bard** (1)	37,796	**Fenway Park**	33–26	W3
60	June 7	@ Yankees	6–4	**Lester** (8–2)	García (4–5)	**Papelbon** (12)	48,450	Yankee Stadium	34–26	W4
61	June 8	@ Yankees	11–6	**Wakefield** (3–1)	Burnett (6–4)	**Aceves** (1)	47,863	Yankee Stadium	35–26	W5
62	June 9	@ Yankees	8–3	**Beckett** (5–2)	Sabathia (7–4)		48,845	Yankee Stadium	36–26	W6
63	June 10	@ Blue Jays	5–1	**Buchholz** (5–3)	Reyes (2–5)		28,588	Rogers Centre	37–26	W7
64	June 11	@ Blue Jays	16–4	**Lackey** (4–5)	Morrow (2–4)		39,437	Rogers Centre	38–26	W8
65	June 12	@ Blue Jays	14–1	**Lester** (9–2)	Drabek (4–5)		30,364	Rogers Centre	39–26	W9
66	June 14	@ Rays	4–0	Shields (6–4)	**Wakefield** (3–2)		20,972	Tropicana Field	39–27	L1
67	June 15	@ Rays	3–0	**Beckett** (6–2)	Hellickson (7–5)		19,388	Tropicana Field	40–27	W1
68	June 16	@ Rays	4–2	**Buchholz** (6–3)	Price (7–6)	**Papelbon** (13)	23,495	Tropicana Field	41–27	W2
69	June 17	Brewers	10–4	**Lackey** (5–5)	Estrada (1–4)		37,833	**Fenway Park**	42–27	W3
70	June 18	Brewers	4–2	Wolf (5–4)	**Lester** (9–3)	Axford (19)	38,175	**Fenway Park**	42–28	L1
71	June 19	Brewers	12–3	**Wakefield** (4–2)	Gallardo (8–4)		37,903	**Fenway Park**	43–28	W1
72	June 20	Padres	14–5	**Albers** (2–3)	Luebke (1–2)		38,020	**Fenway Park**	44–28	W2
73	June 21	Padres	5–4	Qualls (4–3)	**Wheeler** (0–1)	Bell (19)	38,422	**Fenway Park**	44–29	L1
74	June 22	Padres	5–1 (8)	Richard (3–9)	**Lackey** (5–6)		37,419	**Fenway Park**	44–30	L2
75	June 24	@ Pirates	3–1	Malholm (4–8)	**Lester** (9–4)	Hanrahan (21)	39,330	PNC Park	44–31	L3
76	June 25	@ Pirates	6–4	Karstens (5–4)	**Wakefield** (4–3)	Hanrahan (22)	39,483	PNC Park	44–32	L4
77	June 26	@ Pirates	4–2	**Miller** (1–0)	Wood (0–2)	**Papelbon** (14)	39,511	PNC Park	45–32	W1
78	June 28	@ Phillies	5–0	Lee (9–5)	**Beckett** (6–3)		45,714	Citizens Bank Park	45–33	L1
79	June 29	@ Phillies	2–1	Worley (3–1)	**Lackey** (5–7)	Bastardo (3)	45,612	Citizens Bank Park	45–34	L2
80	June 30	@ Phillies	5–2	**Lester** (10–4)	Herndon (0–2)	**Papelbon** (15)	45,810	Citizens Bank Park	46–34	W1

July (20–6)

#	Date	Opponent	Score	Win	Loss	Save	Attendance	Stadium	Record	Boxscore / Streak
81	July 1	@ Astros	7–5	**Wheeler** (1–1)	Escalona (1–1)	**Papelbon** (16)	36,279	Minute Maid Park	47–34	W2
82	July 2	@ Astros	10–4	**Miller** (2–0)	Happ (3–10)		39,021	Minute Maid Park	48–34	W3
83	July 3	@ Astros	2–1	**Beckett** (7–3)	Melancon (5–2)	**Papelbon** (17)	38,035	Minute Maid Park	49–34	W4
84	July 4	Blue Jays	9–7	Morrow (5–4)	**Lackey** (5–8)	Francisco (10)	38,072	**Fenway Park**	49–35	L1
85	July 5	Blue Jays	3–2	**Albers** (3–3)	Cecil (1–4)	**Papelbon** (18)	37,745	**Fenway Park**	50–35	W1
86	July 6	Blue Jays	6–4	**Wakefield** (5–3)	Romero (7–8)	**Papelbon** (19)	37,404	**Fenway Park**	51–35	W2
87	July 7	Orioles	10–4	**Miller** (3–0)	Arrieta (9–6)		37,981	**Fenway Park**	52–35	W3
88	July 8	Orioles	10–3 (brawl)	**Beckett** (8–3)	Britton (6–7)		37,729	**Fenway Park**	53–35	W4
89	July 9	Orioles	4–0	**Lackey** (6–8)	Simón (1–2)		38,205	**Fenway Park**	54–35	W5
90	July 10	Orioles	8–6	**Aceves** (4–1)	Guthrie (3–12)	**Papelbon** (20)	37,688	**Fenway Park**	55–35	W6
91	July 15	@ Rays	9–6	Price (9–7)	**Miller** (3–1)	Farnsworth (18)	25,729	Tropicana Field	55–36	L1
92	July 16	@ Rays	9–5	**Lackey** (7–8)	Shields (8–8)		32,487	Tropicana Field	56–36	W1
93	July 17	@ Rays	1–0 (16)	**Aceves** (5–1)	Russell (1–2)	**Papelbon** (21)	21,504	Tropicana Field	57–36	W2
94	July 18	@ Orioles	15–10	**Wheeler** (2–1)	González (1–2)		27,924	Camden Yards	58–36	W3
95	July 19	@ Orioles	6–2	Guthrie (4–13)	**Weiland** (0–1)	Johnson (1)	32,314	Camden Yards	58–37	L1
96	July 20	@ Orioles	4–0	**Miller** (4–1)	Arrieta (9–7)		35,174	Camden Yards	59–37	W1
97	July 22	Mariners	7–4	**Lackey** (8–8)	Hernández (8–9)	**Papelbon** (22)	38,048	**Fenway Park**	60–37	W2
98	July 23	Mariners	3–1	**Beckett** (9–3)	Beavan (1–2)	**Papelbon** (23)	38,115	**Fenway Park**	61–37	W3
99	July 24	Mariners	12–8	**Wakefield** (6–3)	Pineda (8–7)		37,650	**Fenway Park**	62–37	W4
100	July 25	Royals	3–1 (14)	Coleman (1–2)	**Williams** (0–1)	Soria (18)	37,727	**Fenway Park**	62–38	L1
101	July 26	Royals	13–9	**Aceves** (6–1)	Adcock (1–1)		37,460	**Fenway Park**	63–38	W1
102	July 27	Royals	12–5	**Lackey** (9–8)	Chen (5–4)		38,329	**Fenway Park**	64–38	W2
103	July 28	Royals	4–3	Hochevar (7–8)	**Beckett** (9–4)	Soria (19)	37,822	**Fenway Park**	64–39	L1
104	July 29	@ White Sox	3–1	Floyd (9–9)	**Wakefield** (6–4)	Santos (22)	27,513	U.S. Cellular Field	64–40	L2
105	July 30	@ White Sox	10–2	**Lester** (10–4)	Humber (8–7)		33,919	U.S. Cellular Field	65–40	W1
106	July 31	@ White Sox	5–3	**Aceves** (7–1)	Crain (5–3)	**Papelbon** (24)	28,278	U.S. Cellular Field	66–40	W2

August (17–12)

#	Date	Opponent	Score	Win	Loss	Save	Attendance	Stadium	Record	Boxscore / Streak
107	August 1	Indians	9–6	Pérez (4–1)	**Bard** (1–5)		37,943	**Fenway Park**	66–41	L1
108	August 2	Indians	3–2	**Papelbon** (3–0)	Pestano (1–1)		38,101	**Fenway Park**	67–41	W1
109	August 3	Indians	4–3	**Papelbon** (4–0)	Smith (2–2)		38,172	**Fenway Park**	68–41	W2
110	August 4	Indians	7–3	Masterson (9–7)	**Morales** (0–2)		38,477	**Fenway Park**	68–42	L1
111	August 5	Yankees	3–2	Logan (3–2)	**Lester** (11–5)	Rivera (29)	38,006	**Fenway Park**	68–43	L2
112	August 6	Yankees	10–4	**Lackey** (10–8)	Sabathia (16–6)		37,416	**Fenway Park**	69–43	W1
113	August 7	Yankees	3–2 (10)	**Bard** (2–5)	Hughes (2–4)		38,189	**Fenway Park**	70–43	W2
114	August 8	@ Twins	8–6	**Aceves** (8–1)	Perkins (3–2)	**Papelbon** (25)	40,080	Target Field	71–43	W3
115	August 9	@ Twins	4–3	**Albers** (4–3)	Capps (3–6)	**Papelbon** (26)	39,974	Target Field	72–43	W4
116	August 10	@ Twins	5–2	Perkins (4–2)	**Lester** (11–6)	Nathan (9)	40,491	Target Field	72–44	L1
117	August 12	@ Mariners	6–4	**Lackey** (11–8)	Beavan (3–3)	**Papelbon** (27)	40,682	Safeco Field	73–44	W1
118	August 13	@ Mariners	5–4	Hernández (11–10)	**Beckett** (9–5)	League (28)	41,326	Safeco Field	73–45	L1
119	August 14	@ Mariners	5–3	Furbush (3–4)	**Wakefield** (6–5)	League (29)	43,777	Safeco Field	73–46	L2
120	August 16	Rays	3–1	**Lester** (12–6)	Shields (11–10)	**Papelbon** (28)	38,525	**Fenway Park**	74–46	W1
121	August 16	Rays	6–2	Niemann (8–4)	**Bédard** (4–8)		38,278	**Fenway Park**	74–47	L1
122	August 17	Rays	4–0	Price (11–10)	**Lackey** (11–9)		37,747	**Fenway Park**	74–48	L2
123	August 18	@ Royals	4–3	**Beckett** (10–5)	Hochevar (8–10)	**Papelbon** (29)	20,547	Kauffman Stadium	75–48	W1
124	August 19	@ Royals	7–1	**Miller** (5–1)	Francis (4–14)	**Aceves** (2)	21,262	Kauffman Stadium	76–48	W2
125	August 20	@ Royals	9–4	Paulino (2–9)	**Albers** (4–4)		28,588	Kauffman Stadium	76–49	L1
126	August 21	@ Royals	6–1	**Lester** (13–6)	Duffy (3–8)		25,723	Kauffman Stadium	77–49	W1
127	August 22	@ Rangers	4–0	Wilson (13–5)	**Bédard** (4–9)		33,920	Rangers Ballpark	77–50	L1
128	August 23	@ Rangers	11–5	**Lackey** (12–9)	Lewis (11–9)		25,705	Rangers Ballpark	78–50	W1
129	August 24	@ Rangers	13–2	**Beckett** (11–5)	Harrison (10–9)		30,724	Rangers Ballpark	79–50	W2
130	August 25	@ Rangers	6–0	**Miller** (6–1)	Ogando (12–6)		29,729	Rangers Ballpark	80–50	W3
131	August 26	Athletics	15–5	González (11–11)	**Wakefield** (6–6)		38,239	**Fenway Park**	80–51	L1
August 27: **Hurricane Irene forced Saturday doubleheader vs. OAK** (link)
132	August 27	Athletics	9–3	**Lester** (14–6)	Moscoso (6–8)		37,314	**Fenway Park**	81–51	W1
133	August 27	Athletics	4–0	**Aceves** (9–1)	Godfrey (1–2)		37,039	**Fenway Park**	82–51	W2
**Normal schedule resumes**
134	August 30	Yankees	5–2	Sabathia (18–7)	**Lackey** (12–10)	Rivera (35)	37,773	**Fenway Park**	82–52	L1
135	August 31	Yankees	9–5	**Beckett** (12–5)	Hughes (4–5)		38,021	**Fenway Park**	83–52	W1

September (7–20)

#	Date	Opponent	Score	Win	Loss	Save	Attendance	Stadium	Record	Boxscore / Streak
136	September 1	Yankees	4–2	Wade (3–0)	**Aceves** (9–2)	Rivera (36)	38,074	**Fenway Park**	83–53	L1
137	September 2	Rangers	10–0	Holland (13–5)	**Miller** (6–2)		38,083	**Fenway Park**	83–54	L2
138	September 3	Rangers	12–7	**Bédard** (5–9)	Lewis (11–10)		37,806	**Fenway Park**	84–54	W1
139	September 4	Rangers	11–4	Harrison (11–9)	**Lackey** (12–11)		37,744	**Fenway Park**	84–55	L1
140	September 5	@ Blue Jays	1–0 (11)	Camp (3–3)	**Wheeler** (2–2)		27,573	Rogers Centre	84–56	L2
141	September 6	@ Blue Jays	14–0	**Lester** (15–6)	Perez (3–3)		17,565	Rogers Centre	85–56	W1
142	September 7	@ Blue Jays	11–10	Camp (4–3)	**Bard** (2–6)	Francisco (13)	16,154	Rogers Centre	85–57	L1
143	September 8	@ Blue Jays	7–4	Romero (14–10)	**Miller** (6–3)		17,189	Rogers Centre	85–58	L2
144	September 9	@ Rays	7–2	Davis (10–8)	**Lackey** (12–12)		18,482	Tropicana Field	85–59	L3
145	September 10	@ Rays	5–6 (11)	Gomes (2–1)	**Bard** (2–7)		24,566	Tropicana Field	85–60	L4
146	September 11	@ Rays	1–9	Shields (15–10)	**Lester** (15–7)		25,220	Tropicana Field	85–61	L5
147	September 13	Blue Jays	18–6	**Wakefield** (7–6)	Morrow (9–11)		38,020	**Fenway Park**	86–61	W1
148	September 14	Blue Jays	4–5	Romero (15–10)	**Bard** (2–8)	Francisco (15)	37,087	**Fenway Park**	86–62	L1
149	September 15	Rays	9–2	Hellickson (13–10)	**Weiland** (0–2)		38,071	**Fenway Park**	86–63	L2
150	September 16	Rays	4–3	**Beckett** (13–5)	Shields (15–11)	**Papelbon** (30)	38,019	**Fenway Park**	87–63	W1
151	September 17	Rays	4–3	Niemann (11–7)	**Lester** (15–8)	Peralta (4)	37,682	**Fenway Park**	87–64	L1
152	September 18	Rays	8–5	McGee (3–1)	**Wakefield** (7–7)	Peralta (5)	37,613	**Fenway Park**	87–65	L2
153	September 19	Orioles	6–5	Guthrie (9–17)	**Weiland** (0–3)	Johnson (7)	37,885	**Fenway Park**	87–66	L3
154	September 19	Orioles	18–9	**Atchison** (1–0)	Matusz (1–8)		37,261	**Fenway Park**	88–66	W1
155	September 20	Orioles	7–5	Eyre (2–1)	**Bard** (2–9)	Johnson (8)	37,414	**Fenway Park**	88–67	L1
156	September 21	Orioles	6–4	Rapada (2–0)	**Beckett** (13–6)	Johnson (9)	38,004	**Fenway Park**	88–68	L2
157	September 23	@ Yankees	Postponed (rain); Makeup: September 25 as part of a Doubleheader							Rain4
158	September 24	@ Yankees	9–1	García (12–8)	**Lester** (15–9)		49,556	Yankee Stadium	88–69	L3
159	September 25	@ Yankees	6–2	Burnett (11–11)	**Wakefield** (7–8)		49,541	Yankee Stadium	88–70	L4
159	September 25	@ Yankees	7–4 (14)	**Morales** (1–2)	Proctor (2–5)	Doubront (1)	49,072	Yankee Stadium	89–70	W1
160	September 26	@ Orioles	6–3	Patton (2–1)	**Beckett** (13–7)		21,786	Camden Yards	89–71	L1
161	September 27	@ Orioles	7–6	**Aceves** (10–2)	Britton (11–11)	**Papelbon** (31)	22,123	Camden Yards	90–71	W1
162	September 28	@ Orioles	4–3	Johnson (6–5)	**Papelbon** (4–1)		29,749	Camden Yards	90–72	L1

=== Players stats ===
==== Batting ====
Note: ## = Player number; G = Games played; AB = At bats; R = Runs scored; H = Hits; 2B = Doubles; 3B = Triples; HR = Home runs; RBI = Runs batted in; BB = Base on balls; SO = Strikeouts; SB = Stolen bases; AVG = Batting average

##	Player	G	AB	R	H	2B	3B	HR	RBI	BB	SO	SB	AVG
62	Lars Anderson	6	5	2	0	0	0	0	0	0	3	0	.000
3	Mike Avilés	38	101	17	32	6	0	2	8	4	17	4	.317
23	Mike Cameron	33	94	9	14	2	0	3	9	8	25	0	.149
13	Carl Crawford	130	506	65	129	29	7	11	56	23	104	18	.255
7	J.D. Drew	81	248	23	55	6	1	4	22	33	58	0	.222
2	Jacoby Ellsbury	158	660	119	212	46	5	32	105	52	98	39	.321
55	Joey Gathright	7	0	1	0	0	0	0	0	1	0	1	----
28	Adrián González	159	630	108	213	45	3	27	117	74	119	1	.338
28	José Iglesias	10	6	3	2	0	0	0	0	0	2	0	.333
36	Conor Jackson	12	19	2	3	0	0	1	5	2	3	0	.158
60	Ryan Lavarnway	17	39	5	9	2	0	2	8	4	10	0	.231
12	Jed Lowrie	88	309	40	78	14	4	6	36	23	60	1	.252
54	Darnell McDonald	79	157	26	37	6	1	6	24	14	33	2	.236
56	Yamaico Navarro	16	37	6	8	2	0	1	3	3	9	0	.216
34	David Ortiz	146	525	84	162	40	1	29	96	78	83	1	.309
15	Dustin Pedroia	159	635	102	195	37	3	21	91	86	85	26	.307
16	Josh Reddick	87	254	41	71	18	3	7	28	19	50	1	.280
39	Jarrod Saltalamacchia	103	358	52	84	23	3	16	56	24	119	1	.235
10	Marco Scutaro	113	395	59	118	26	1	7	54	38	36	4	.299
71	Nate Spears	3	4	0	0	0	0	0	0	0	1	0	.000
44	Drew Sutton	31	54	11	17	7	0	0	7	3	13	0	.315
33	Jason Varitek	68	222	32	49	10	1	11	36	21	67	0	.221
20	Kevin Youkilis	120	431	68	111	32	2	17	80	68	100	3	.258
	Pitcher totals	162	21	0	1	1	0	0	1	0	13	0	.048
	**Team totals**	**162**	**5710**	**875**	**1600**	**352**	**35**	**203**	**842**	**578**	**1108**	**102**	**.280**

- Source: « Boston Red Sox Batting Stats »

==== Pitching ====
Note: ## = Player number; W = Wins; L = Losses; ERA = Earned run average; G = Games pitched; GS = Games started; SV = Saves; SVO = Saves opportunities; IP = Innings pitched; H = Hits allowed; R= Runs; ER = Earned runs allowed; HR = Home runs allowed; BB = Walks allowed; SO = Strikeouts

##	Player	W	L	ERA	G	GS	SV	SVO	IP	H	R	ER	HR	BB	SO
91	Alfredo Aceves	10	2	2.61	55	4	2	5	114.0	84	37	33	8	42	80
32	Matt Albers	4	4	4.73	56	0	0	3	64.2	62	35	34	7	31	68
48	Scott Atchison	1	0	3.26	17	0	1	1	30.1	31	11	11	0	6	17
51	Daniel Bard	2	9	3.33	70	0	1	6	73.0	46	29	27	5	24	74
23	Érik Bédard	1	2	4.03	8	8	0	0	38.0	41	22	17	3	18	38
19	Josh Beckett	13	7	2.89	30	30	0	0	193.0	146	65	62	21	52	175
64	Mickael Bowden	0	0	4.05	14	0	0	0	20.0	19	9	9	3	11	17
11	Clay Buchholz	6	3	3.48	14	14	0	0	82.2	76	34	32	10	31	60
61	Félix Doubront	0	0	6.10	11	0	1	1	10.1	12	7	7	1	8	6
53	Rich Hill	0	0	0.00	9	0	0	0	8.0	3	0	0	0	3	12
68	Tommy Hottovy	0	0	6.75	8	0	0	0	4.0	4	3	3	0	3	2
52	Bobby Jenks	2	2	6.32	19	0	0	2	15.2	22	12	11	1	13	17
41	John Lackey	12	12	6.41	28	28	0	0	160.0	203	119	114	20	56	108
31	Jon Lester	15	9	3.47	31	31	0	0	191.2	166	77	74	20	75	182
18	Daisuke Matsuzaka	3	3	5.30	8	7	0	0	37.1	32	24	22	4	23	26
54	Darnell McDonald	0	0	18.00	1	0	0	0	1.0	1	2	2	0	2	0
30	Andrew Miller	6	3	5.54	17	12	0	0	65.0	77	43	40	8	41	50
56	Trever Miller	0	0	0.00	3	0	0	0	2.0	0	0	0	0	0	1
46	Franklin Morales	1	1	3.62	36	0	0	0	32.1	30	15	13	4	11	31
37	Hideki Okajima	1	0	4.32	7	0	0	0	8.1	7	4	4	0	5	6
58	Jonathan Papelbon	4	1	2.94	63	0	31	34	64.1	50	22	21	3	10	87
59	Dennys Reyes	0	0	16.20	4	0	0	0	1.2	2	3	3	0	2	1
63	Junichi Tazawa	0	0	6.00	3	0	0	0	3.0	3	2	2	1	1	4
49	Tim Wakefield	7	8	5.12	33	23	0	0	154.2	163	110	88	25	47	93
70	Kyle Weiland	0	3	7.66	7	5	0	0	24.2	29	22	21	5	12	13
35	Dan Wheeler	2	2	4.38	47	0	0	0	49.1	47	24	24	7	8	39
43	Randy Williams	0	1	6.48	7	0	0	0	8.1	10	6	6	0	5	6
	**Team totals**	**90**	**72**	**4.20**	**162**	**162**	**36**	**52**	**1457.1**	**1366**	**737**	**680**	**156**	**540**	**1213**

- Source: « Boston Red Sox Pitching Stats »

== Awards and honors ==
- Carl Crawford – AL Player of the Week (May 23–29)
- Jacoby Ellsbury – Silver Slugger Award (OF), Gold Glove Award (OF), AL Player of the Week (June 6–12)
- Adrián González – Silver Slugger Award (1B), Gold Glove Award (1B), AL Player of the Month (June), AL Player of the Week (August 22–28)
- David Ortiz – Silver Slugger Award (DH), AL Player of the Week (May 30–June 5)
- Dustin Pedroia – Gold Glove Award (2B), AL Player of the Month (July)

All-Star Game

- Josh Beckett, reserve P
- Jacoby Ellsbury, reserve OF
- Adrián González, starting 1B
- Jon Lester, reserve P (roster replacement)
- David Ortiz, starting DH
- Kevin Youkilis, reserve 3B (roster replacement)

== Farm system ==
Level	Team	League	Manager
AAA	Pawtucket Red Sox	International League	Arnie Beyeler
AA	Portland Sea Dogs	Eastern League	Kevin Boles
A-Advanced	Salem Red Sox	Carolina League	Bruce Crabbe
A	Greenville Drive	South Atlantic League	Billy McMillon
A-Short Season	Lowell Spinners	New York–Penn League	Carlos Febles
Rookie	GCL Red Sox	Gulf Coast League	George Lombard
Rookie	DSL Red Sox	Dominican Summer League	José Zapata

=== Amateur draft ===
Boston's selections during the first five rounds of the 2011 MLB draft were as follows:

Round	Pick	Player	Pos.	School (sorts by state)
1	19	Matt Barnes	P	University of Connecticut
1	26	Blake Swihart	C	V. Sue Cleveland High School (NM)
1	36	Henry Owens	P	Edison High School (CA)
1	40	Jackie Bradley Jr.	OF	University of South Carolina
2	81	Williams Jerez	P	Grand Street High School (NY)
3	111	Jordan Weems	C	Columbus High School (GA)
4	142	Noé Ramirez	P	Cal State Fullerton
5	172	Mookie Betts	SS	John Overton High School (TN)

Additionally, the team selected Travis Shaw in the 9th round, Daniel Gossett in the 16th round, and Mac Williamson in the 46th round.

Each of the above listed draftees went on to play in MLB, with Barnes being the last to leave the Red Sox organization, in January 2023.
