= Daniel Bard =

American baseball player (born 1985)

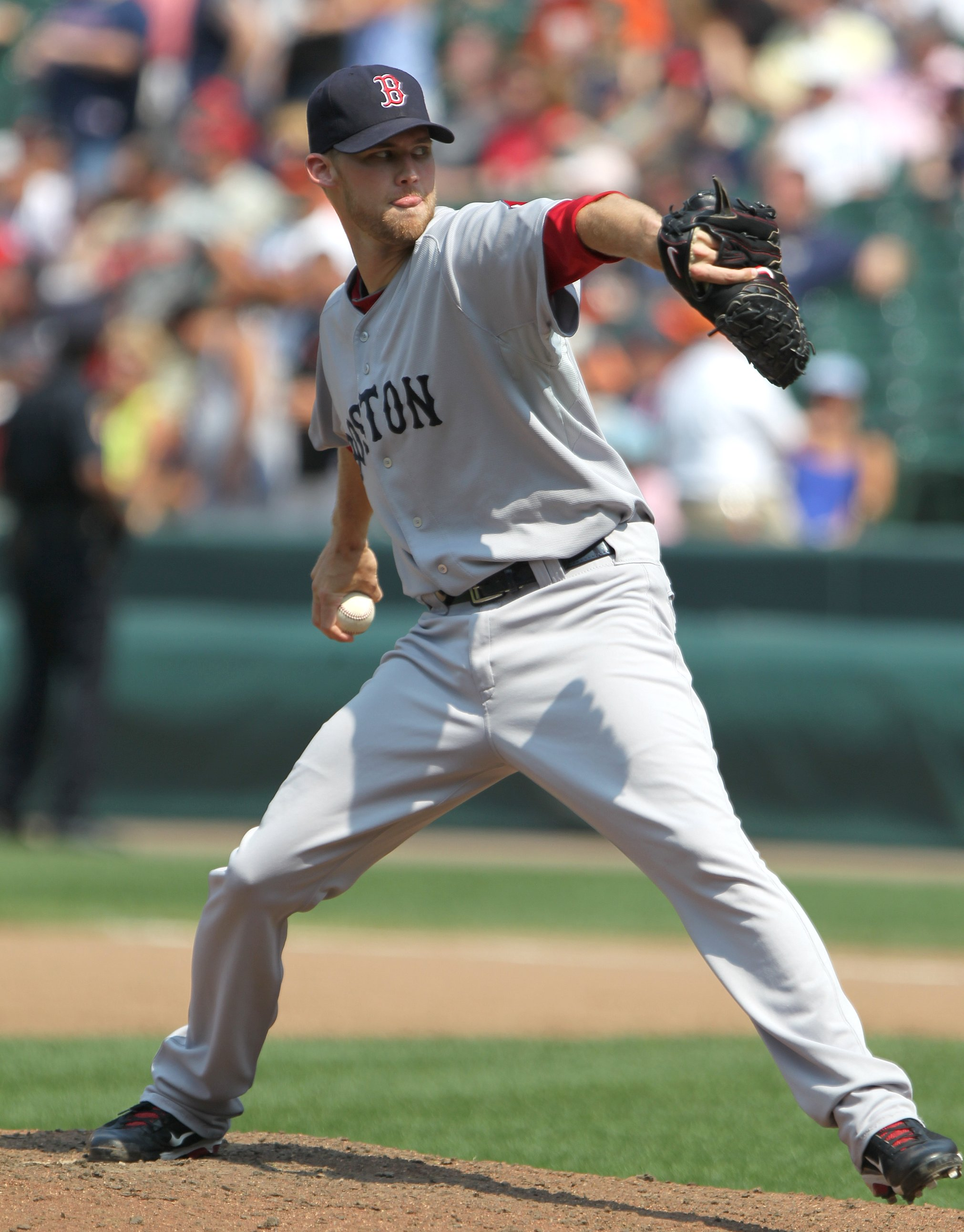
- Bard with the Boston Red Sox in 2011
- Pitcher
- Born: June 25, 1985 (age 41); Houston, Texas, U.S.
- Batted: Right Threw: Right

MLB debut
- May 13, 2009, for the Boston Red Sox

Last MLB appearance
- September 26, 2023, for the Colorado Rockies

MLB statistics
- Win–loss record: 31–35
- Earned run average: 3.74
- Strikeouts: 475
- Saves: 66
- Stats at Baseball Reference

Teams
- Boston Red Sox (2009–2013); Colorado Rockies (2020–2023)

Career highlights and awards
- NL Comeback Player of the Year (2020)
Medals
Men's baseball
Representing United States
World Baseball Classic
Silver medal – second place	2023 Miami	Team
World University Championship
Gold medal – first place	2004 Tainan	Team

Daniel Paul Bard (born June 25, 1985) is an American former professional baseball pitcher. He played in Major League Baseball (MLB) for the Boston Red Sox from 2009 to 2013 and the Colorado Rockies from 2020 to 2023.

In 2011, Bard set a Red Sox team record with 25 consecutive scoreless appearances. His highest velocity pitch was 102 miles per hour (164 km/h). In subsequent years, Bard experienced a loss of control over his pitches, derailing his playing career. After pitching in only two major league games in 2013, he played for several minor league teams before retiring in 2017 to become a player mentor. In 2020, Bard returned as a player after regaining his control, earned a spot on the Rockies' MLB roster, and went on to win the National League Comeback Player of the Year Award as their closing pitcher.

== College career ==
Bard attended Charlotte Christian School and then played college baseball at the University of North Carolina. At the midpoint of the 2004 season, Baseball America named Bard the top freshman pitcher in the U.S., and gave him Freshman All-America honors. For his season's work, Bard was named to the Baseball America All-Freshman second team, and was named a Freshman All-American by Collegiate Baseball. He was Atlantic Coast Conference (ACC) freshman of the year, and earned first-team all-conference honors. In 16 games pitched, Bard was 8–4 with a 3.88 earned run average (ERA); his eight wins tied the North Carolina Tar Heels baseball freshman record.

For the 2005 season, Bard was named preseason first-team All-America by Baseball America and was named preseason third-team All-America by Collegiate Baseball and by the National Collegiate Baseball Writers Association. Bard went 7–5 with a 4.22 ERA in 16 starts. and was third in the ACC in opponents' batting average at .219. He was named to the Roger Clemens Award watch list.

Bard was a second-team summer All-American selection in the 2005 Cape Cod League after a successful summer with the Wareham Gatemen, where he led the league in innings pitched and strikeouts, while finishing third in ERA. Bard and fellow North Carolina left-hander Andrew Miller were rated the top two prospects in the Cape Cod League. Bard and Miller led North Carolina to the College World Series, where they lost to Oregon State, two games to one. He finished his junior year with a 9–4 record and a 3.64 ERA in 17 starts. He earned ACC pitcher of the week honors twice during the 2006 season.

== Professional career ==
=== Boston Red Sox ===
On June 6, 2006, Bard was selected in the first round (28th overall) of the 2006 MLB draft by the Boston Red Sox. He was selected as a compensation pick from the New York Yankees for the signing of Johnny Damon. On September 4, Bard signed with the team. He admitted he had enrolled in classes at the University of North Carolina as a backup plan in case a deal with the Red Sox was not finalized in time. Bard had been previously selected in the 20th round with the 604th overall selection out of high school by the New York Yankees in the 2003 MLB draft, but did not sign.

==== Minor leagues ====
Drafted as a starting pitcher, Bard spent the 2007 season in the same role, starting all 22 of his appearances with the Greenville Drive and Lancaster JetHawks. He posted a 7.05 ERA between the two levels, and walked 78 batters in 75 1/3 innings pitched. Because of the poor success starting, at the end of the 2007 season he was moved into the bullpen to pitch as a reliever. While pitching out of the bullpen for the Honolulu Sharks of the Hawaii Winter Baseball league, Bard put up a 1.08 ERA in 16 appearances. His control remained an issue, but with some improvement.

Remaining in the bullpen during 2008, Bard split time between the Greenville Drive and Portland Sea Dogs. He posted a 1.51 ERA and had 107 strikeouts in 77 2/3 innings of work, and was named the 2008 Minor League Pitcher of the Year by the Red Sox.

Bard began the 2009 season with the Triple-A Pawtucket Red Sox. He faced 58 batters in 16 innings, giving up six hits and striking out 29. Of those six hits, two were home runs.

==== 2009 ====
On May 10, 2009, Red Sox pitcher Javier López was designated for assignment, and Bard was called up from Triple-A. On May 13, 2009, he made his major-league debut against the Los Angeles Angels of Anaheim, pitching two scoreless innings in an 8–4 loss.

Bard made his debut at Fenway Park on May 20, against the Toronto Blue Jays in the 8th inning. He gave up two hits on the first two pitches thrown, eventually giving up a run. He pitched 2/3 of an inning before being replaced by left-hander Hideki Okajima after the second out, leaving two runners on base. He recorded his first career save in the 13th inning of a 5–2 victory against the Philadelphia Phillies. Although he gave up a walk and hit a batter, Bard managed to strike out the side to clinch the save. Bard recorded his first major league win on August 26, against the Chicago White Sox after pitching a scoreless inning and a third in the eight and ninth followed by a walk off home run by David Ortiz.

Bard was a post-season correspondent for ESPN.

==== 2010 ====
Bard was the primary setup man in the bullpen once again. He appeared in 73 games, posted a 1.93 ERA and 1.00 WHIP on the season, with 76 strikeouts.

==== 2011 ====
Bard set the club record with 25 consecutive scoreless appearances, running from May 27 to July 31. The previous record was held by Ugueth Urbina.

Bard's season, like that of his team, came to a crushing end. After dazzling for most of 2011, Bard had a terrible last month of the year: he finished September 0–4 with a 10.64 ERA, issuing more walks (nine) than he had in the previous three months combined (eight). Based on win probability added, the player most responsible for Boston's collapse was Bard.

==== 2012 ====
The Red Sox made Bard a starting pitcher for 2012. He started the season 5–6 with a 5.24 ERA, striking out 34 while walking 37 and hitting eight batters. On June 5, 2012, Bard was optioned to Triple-A Pawtucket. In his last start prior to his demotion, he lasted 1.2 innings against the Toronto Blue Jays, giving up five runs, six walks, and hitting two batters. Bard continued to struggle in Triple-A, surrendering 15 walks and posting a 7.08 ERA in 20 1/3 innings through the end of July. Bard was recalled on August 30 when Zach Stewart was optioned out.

==== 2013 ====
Bard started the 2013 season in the team's Double-A affiliate in Portland. He was recalled on April 23 and made two appearances, allowing one earned run in a total of one inning pitched; this would be his final major league appearances for Boston. On April 28, he was optioned back to Portland to make room for returning reliever Joel Hanrahan. He was designated for assignment on September 1.

On September 4, 2013, Bard was claimed off waivers by the Chicago Cubs from the Red Sox. He did not appear for the organization and became a free agent on December 2, after being non-tendered by the Cubs.

=== Texas Rangers ===
On January 31, 2014, Bard signed with the Texas Rangers. He lost what little command of his pitches he had left, walking nine and hitting seven batters while recording two outs in a stint for the Single-A Hickory Crawdads. On June 19, Bard was released by the Rangers organization.

The Chicago Cubs signed Bard to a minor league contract on January 18, 2015. He did not appear in any games during the campaign, and became a free agent after the 2015 season.

=== St. Louis Cardinals ===
On January 11, 2016, Bard signed a minor league contract with the Pittsburgh Pirates. After failing to make a minor league appearance, Bard was released by Pittsburgh on May 14. On June 6, Bard signed a minor league contract with the St. Louis Cardinals. He made eight minor league appearances for the High-A Palm Beach Cardinals during the 2016 season, allowing eight earned runs in three innings pitched.

Bard then made 10 appearances for the Double-A Springfield Cardinals in 2017, allowing 10 earned runs in 8 2/3 innings. He was released by the Cardinals organization on May 18, 2017.

=== New York Mets ===
On June 11, 2017, Bard signed a minor league contract with the New York Mets. He made a single appearance with the rookie-level Gulf Coast League Mets, allowing four earned runs in two-thirds of an inning.

Bard retired from professional baseball on January 4, 2018. He was hired by the Arizona Diamondbacks on February 1, to serve as a franchise player mentor.

=== Colorado Rockies ===
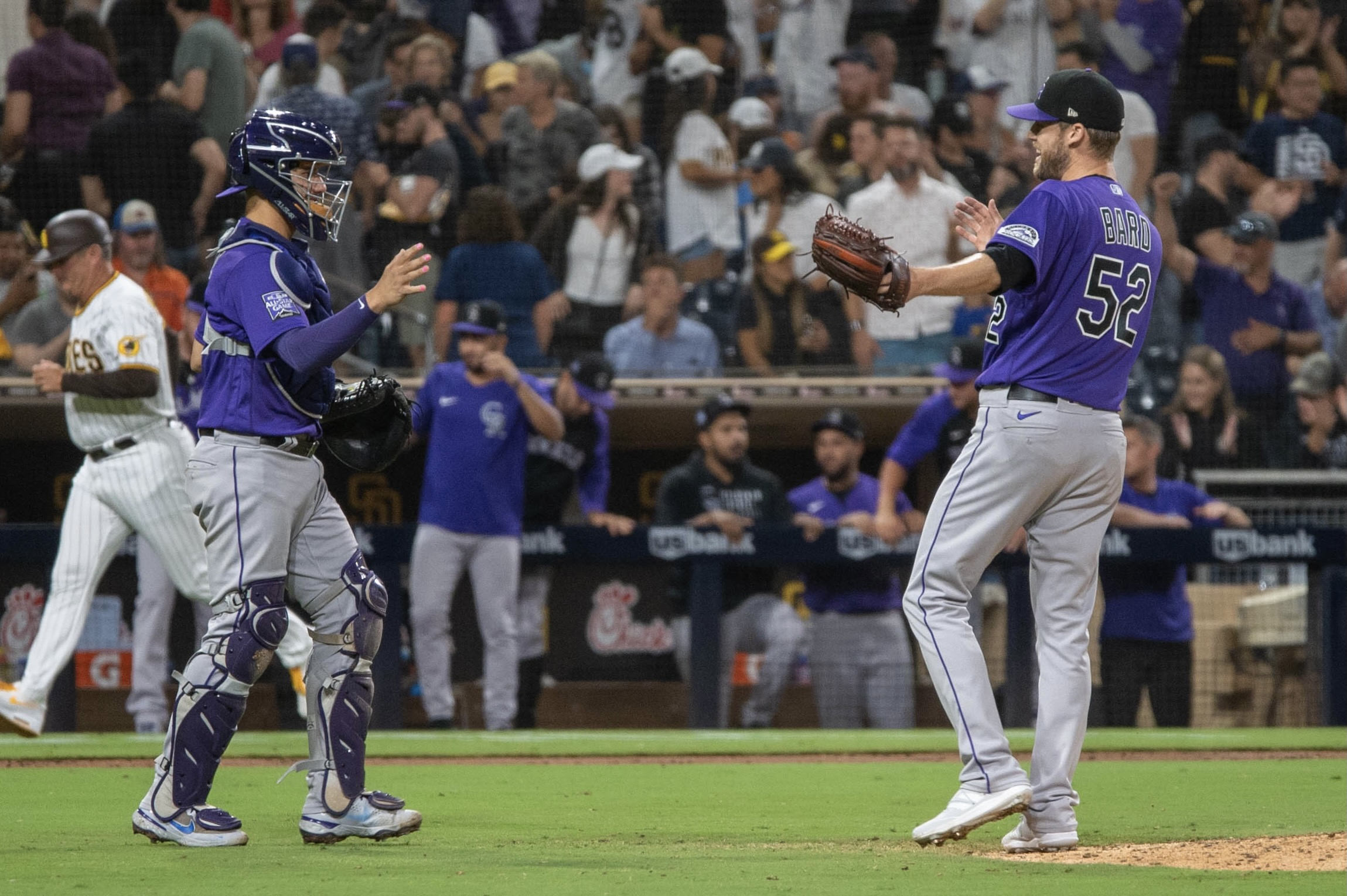
Bard is greeted by catcher Dom Núñez after a win against the Padres on July 10, 2021

In February 2020, Bard threw for scouts, and announced he was going to attempt a comeback. On February 22, 2020, Bard signed a minor league deal with the Colorado Rockies, and was subsequently assigned to their Triple-A team, the Albuquerque Isotopes. On July 17, it was announced that Bard would have his contract selected to the 40-man roster by the Rockies in advance of Opening Day. His contract was selected the following day. On July 25, Bard played in his first MLB game since 2013, pitching 1 1/3 scoreless innings in relief. He was credited with the win, his first since May 29, 2012. On August 11, he was credited with the save, his first since 2011. Bard had his best pitching output since 2011, as he recorded 6 saves in 24 2/3 innings. He also struck out 27 with just 10 walks as he bettered his control. He was named the NL Comeback Player of the Year and received the Tony Conigliaro Award. Bard had an inconsistent 2021 season, as he posted a record of 7–8 with a 5.21 ERA in 67 games. He was 20-for-28 in save opportunities.

On March 22, 2022, Bard signed a $4.4 million contract with the Rockies, avoiding salary arbitration. Bard's 2022 season got off to a strong start, posting 22 saves in 24 chances with an ERA of 1.86 through the end of July. On July 30, 2022, Bard agreed to a 2-year, $19 million contract extension with the Rockies. Bard finished the 2022 season with 34 saves in 37 chances and posted an ERA of 1.79 for the season. He struck out 69 batters in 60 1/3 innings pitched while walking 25 batters.

Bard's control problems returned in 2023 at the age of 38, when he walked 49 batters in 49 1/3 innings and recorded a 4.56 ERA despite having a 1.71 ERA on July 14. Prior to spring training in 2024, it was announced that Bard would be out 5–7 weeks after suffering a torn meniscus. In April, the Rockies determined that Bard would miss the entire regular season for surgery on the flexor tendon in his right elbow.

=== Seattle Mariners ===
On June 4, 2025, Bard signed a minor league contract with the Seattle Mariners. Bard would appear in six games with the Mariners' Triple-A affiliate, the Tacoma Rainiers, giving up two runs in 5 2/3 innings.

On July 18, 2025, Bard announced his retirement from baseball for the second time.

== International career ==
Bard played for Team USA in the 2023 World Baseball Classic (WBC) as a relief pitcher. He gave up 5 earned runs and injured Jose Altuve’s right thumb with a HBP during a quarterfinals matchup with Venezuela.

== Pitching style ==
As of 2012, Bard threw four pitches. About half of his pitches thrown were four-seam fastballs in the range of 92–96 mph. He also featured a two-seam fastball at 93–97 miles per hour (150–156 km/h), slider at 79–83 miles per hour (127–134 km/h), and changeup at 86–89 miles per hour (138–143 km/h). He could touch and break 100 miles per hour (160 km/h) with the two-seamer. Bard's changeup was used almost exclusively against left-handed hitters. He used the slider against lefties as well, but much more so against right-handers. Bard's velocity on all of his pitch types dipped several miles per hour in 2012, presumably as a result of his conversion from a relief pitcher to a starter. Bard said he was mildly surprised, but not alarmed by the drop: "I knew there’d be somewhat of a drop-off, velocity-wise, when I went to starting. I didn’t think it would be quite this big ... When I’m 93, 94, they’re just as late as they were on that 97. I think it’s the way I’ve been able to set it up. If I can just establish strike one a little more consistently, the velocity can be whatever it wants to be."

During Bard's tenure with the Rockies, Bard remained a power pitcher. In every year with the Rockies, Bard utilized his slider more and more, to the extent that Bard threw a slider more often than sinker. Bard's fastball was considered more of a sinker, having lots of movement. Despite the increased slider usage, Bard's fastball velocity remained very high, and Bard continued to be capable of touching 100 miles per hour with the pitch. Bard occasionally threw a changeup, but only on rare occasion.

== Personal life ==
Bard and his wife, Adair, married in 2010, have three children together and reside in Greenville, South Carolina.

His brother, Luke, played college baseball at Georgia Tech and was drafted by the Minnesota Twins in the first round of the 2012 Major League Baseball draft. Luke Bard made his major league debut for the Los Angeles Angels on March 31, 2018. His cousin John Andreoli is also a professional baseball player; he made his major league debut for the Seattle Mariners on May 23, 2018.
