= Laverne (name) =

- Gender: Unisex
- Language: English

Other names
- Variant forms: LaVern, LaVerne

Laverne or La Verne is both a given name and a surname. Notable people with the name include:

== Given name ==
- LaVerne Andrews (1911–1967), American singer of the Andrews Sisters singing trio
- Laverne Brackens (born 1927), American quilt maker
- Laverne Cox (born 1972), American actress and LGBT advocate
- Verne Gagne (real first name Laverne) (1926-2015), American amateur and professional wrestler and professional wrestling promoter
- Laverne Harding (1905–1984), American cartoon animator
- LaVerne Jones-Ferrette (born 1981), sprinter from the U.S. Virgin Islands
- LaVerne E. Ragster (born 1951), U.S. Virgin Islands marine biologist and academic administrator
- Laverne Smith (born 1954), American football player
- Harry Laverne Anderson (1952–2018), American actor
- Marva LaVerne DeLoach, American librarian

== Surname ==
- Andy LaVerne (born 1947), American jazz pianist, composer, and arranger
- Marc Chirik (1907–1990), also known as Marc Laverne, Communist revolutionary and one of the founding militants of the International Communist Current
- Lauren Laverne (born 1978), English disc jockey and television presenter
- Lucille La Verne (1872–1945), American actress
- Pattie Laverne (died 1916), English singer and actress
- Thomas Laverne (1917–1994), New York state senator

== Fictional characters ==
- LaVerne, a character in Stephen King's The Raft (short story) and its adaptation in Creepshow 2
- Laverne De Fazio, of the television series Laverne & Shirley
- Laverne Roberts, a nurse on the television series Scrubs
- Laverne Todd, a nurse on the television series Empty Nest
- One of the characters in the television show The Cher Show
- One of the player characters in the adventure game Day of the Tentacle
- Laverne (gargoyle), one of the supporting characters from Disney's 1996 animated feature, The Hunchback of Notre Dame
- Julie LaVerne, a character in the film Show Boat (1951), played by Ava Gardner
- Judith Laverne Hopps, the full name of Judy Hopps, the main protagonist from Disney's animated film, Zootopia
- Judge Laverne Holt, a character in the television show, Brooklyn Nine-Nine

== See also ==
- Lavern
