= Laverne =

Laverne or La Verne may refer to:

== Places ==
- La Verne, California, a city
  - University of La Verne, a private research university in La Verne
- Laverne, Oklahoma, a town

== Other uses ==
- Laverne (name)

== See also ==
- Verne (disambiguation)
