= Verne =

Verne may refer to:

== People ==
=== Surname ===
- Jules Verne (1828–1905), French early science-fiction writer
- Adela Verne (1877–1952), English pianist and minor composer
- Kaaren Verne (1918–1967), German actress
- Larry Verne (1936–2013), American novelty song singer
- Mathilde Verne (1865–1936), English pianist and teacher, sister of Adela Verne
- Michel Verne (1861–1925), writer, son of Jules Verne

=== Given name ===
- Verne Blackbourn (1895–1990), American professional baseball player
- Verne Duncan (born 1934), American politician
- Verne Gagne (1926–2015), professional wrestler and wrestling promoter
- Verne Langdon (1941–2011), American mask maker, musician, magician, circus clown, make-up artist, and wrestler.
- Verne Lewellen (1901–1980), American professional football player and general manager of the Green Bay Packers team
- Verne Long (1925–2022), American politician and farmer
- Verne Lundquist (born 1940), journalist for CBS
- Verne Meisner (1938–2005), American polka musician
- Verne Orr (1916–2008), American businessman and 14th Secretary of the Air Force
- Verne Sankey (1890–1934), American kidnapper and bank robber
- Verne Troyer (1969–2018), American actor and stunt man
- Verne Winchell (1915–2002), founder of Winchell's Donuts

=== Fictional characters ===
- Verne Brown, in the film Back to the Future Part III
- Verne, a turtle in the comic strip and animated film Over the Hedge
- Verne, an alien aboard on the R.L.S. Legacy in Treasure Planet

== Places ==
- Verne, Indiana, United States
- The Verne Citadel, a citadel on the Isle of Portland in Dorset, England
  - The Verne (HM Prison), a prison on the citadel
- Verne, Doubs, a commune of the Doubs département in France
- Verne (crater), a lunar crater named after Jules Verne
- Verne, part of the town of Salzkotten, North Rhine-Westphalia, Germany

== Other uses ==
- Verne (grape), another name for the French wine grape Peloursin

== See also ==
- Laverne (disambiguation)
