= Lavernia =

Lavernia can refer to:

- La Vernia, Texas
- La Verna, a mountain in Tuscany, called Lavernia by Thomas Babington Macaulay
- Lavernia, a fictional nation in Mundus Alter et Idem

== See also ==
- Alvernia (disambiguation)
