= La Vergne =

La Vergne may refer to:

- La Vergne, Charente-Maritime, a commune in the Charente-Maritime département in France
- La Vergne, Tennessee, a city in Rutherford County, Tennessee, United States
  - La Vergne High School, a public high school within the city
- La Vergne, Tennessee police department sex scandal

== See also ==
- Lavergne (disambiguation)
