= Nate Spears =

American baseball player (born 1985)

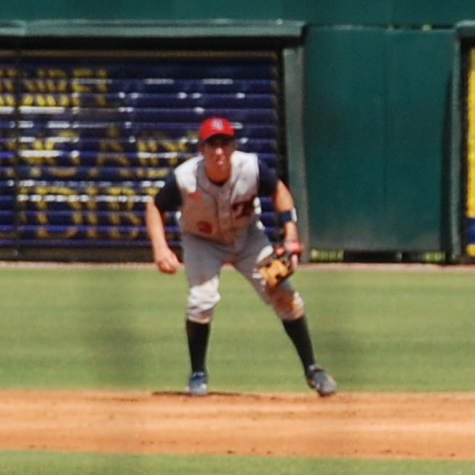
- Spears with the Tennessee Smokies in 2008
- Utility player
- Born: May 3, 1985 (age 41); Fort Myers, Florida, U.S.
- Batted: Left Threw: Right

MLB debut
- September 6, 2011, for the Boston Red Sox

Last MLB appearance
- April 21, 2012, for the Boson Red Sox

MLB statistics
- Batting average: .000
- Home runs: 0
- Runs batted in: 0
- Stats at Baseball Reference

Teams
- Boston Red Sox (2011–2012)

Nathaniel Joseph Spears (born May 3, 1985) is an American former professional baseball utility player and current minor league coach. He played in Major League Baseball (MLB) for the Boston Red Sox.

== Playing career ==
Spears was drafted by the Baltimore Orioles in the 5th round of the 2003 Major League Baseball draft out of Charlotte High School in Punta Gorda, Florida.

=== Baltimore Orioles ===
Spears made his professional debut with the Rookie-level Gulf Coast League Orioles, hitting .289 in 56 games. He played 2004 with Single-A Delmarva, hitting .275 in 97 games. His best year in the Oriole organization was in 2005 with High-A Frederick, where he hit .294 in 112 games and was both a Mid-Season and Post-Season Carolina League All-Star.

=== Chicago Cubs ===
On January 9, 2006, Spears was traded to the Chicago Cubs in the Corey Patterson deal. His debut in the Cubs' organization wasn't the greatest, hitting only .246 in 97 games with High-A Daytona. He started 2007 with Daytona, but was promoted to Double-A Tennessee, where he hit .298 in 38 games there. He played 2008 with Tennessee, where he was a Southern League All-Star and was the Best Hustler. He also played five games with Triple-A Iowa. He also played in the Arizona Fall League for Mesa, hitting .349 in 23 games. He played 2009 with Iowa, where he only hit .253 in 128 games.

=== Boston Red Sox ===
On March 3, 2010, Spears was signed to a minor league deal with an invite to spring training by the Boston Red Sox, where he went 4-6 in 6 games. He played that year with Double-A Portland, where he was an Eastern League All-Star, hitting .272 in 136 games. He was again invited to spring training, hitting .290 in 28 games. He started 2011 with Triple-A Pawtucket before his promotion.

He was called up to the Red Sox on September 5, 2011. Drew Sutton was designated for assignment to make room for him on the 40-man roster.

Spears started the 2012 season in Pawtucket. He was called up from Pawtucket to play with the MLB Boston on April 15, 2012. On April 22, Spears was designated for assignment. After clearing waivers, Spears was outrighted to the Pawtucket Red Sox. In October 2012, Spears elected minor league free agency.

=== Cleveland Indians ===
On November 16, 2012, the Cleveland Indians signed Spears to a minor league contract. He played 68 games for the Triple–A Columbus Clippers and 4 games for the Double–A Akron Aeros in 2013. He became a free agent at the end of the season.

=== Philadelphia Phillies ===
Spears signed a minor league deal with the Philadelphia Phillies on June 8, 2014. He hit .299 with 2 home runs and 15 RBI in 52 games with the Triple–A Lehigh Valley IronPigs. Spears elected free agency after the 2014 season.

=== Somerset Patriots ===
Spears signed with the Somerset Patriots of the Atlantic League of Professional Baseball for the 2015 season. He became a free agent after the 2015 season.

== Coaching career ==
=== Boston Red Sox ===
Spears was a coaching assistant in 2016 with Boston's Single-A affiliate, the Greenville Drive. He was named hitting coach for the Lowell Spinners, Boston's Low-A affiliate, in January 2017. In February 2021, he was named hitting coach for Greenville, now a Boston farm team at the High-A level.

=== Chicago Cubs ===
On February 18, 2026, Spears was announced as a hitting coach for the South Bend Cubs, the High-A affiliate of the Chicago Cubs.
