= Ryan Lavarnway =

American-Israeli baseball player (born 1987)

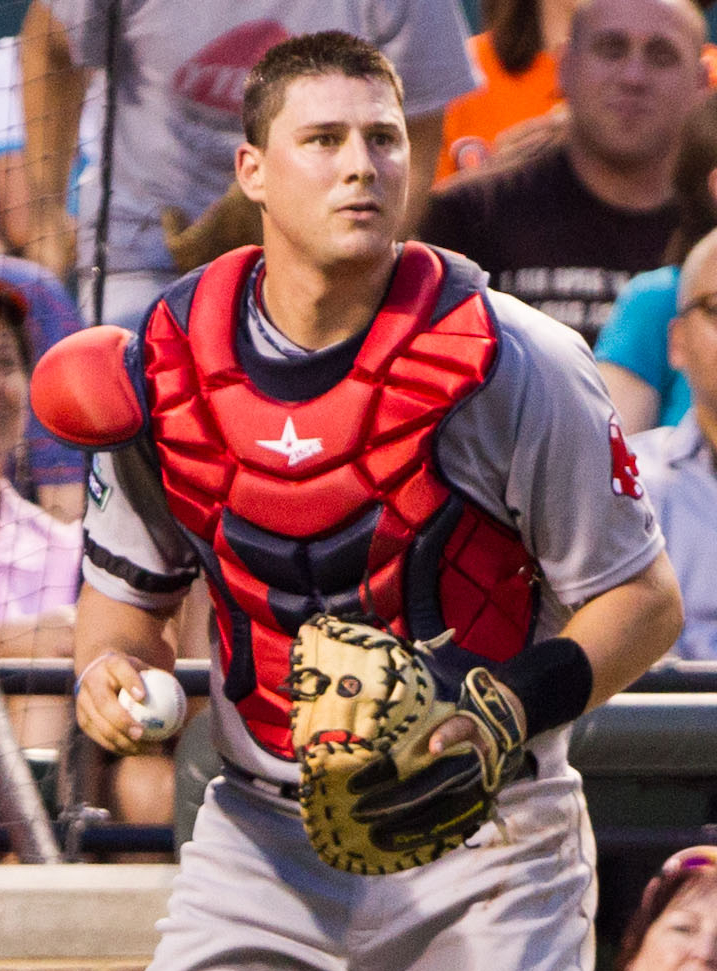
- Lavarnway with the Boston Red Sox in 2012
- Catcher / Designated hitter
- Born: August 7, 1987 (age 39); Burbank, California, U.S.
- Batted: Right Threw: Right

MLB debut
- August 18, 2011, for the Boston Red Sox

Last MLB appearance
- September 12, 2021, for the Cleveland Indians

MLB statistics
- Batting average: .217
- Home runs: 9
- Runs batted in: 50
- Stats at Baseball Reference

Teams
- Boston Red Sox (2011–2014); Baltimore Orioles (2015); Atlanta Braves (2015–2016); Oakland Athletics (2017); Pittsburgh Pirates (2018); Cincinnati Reds (2019); Miami Marlins (2020); Cleveland Indians (2021)

Ryan Cole Lavarnway (Hebrew: ריאן לווארנוויי; born August 7, 1987) is an American-Israeli former professional baseball catcher. He played in Major League Baseball (MLB) for the Boston Red Sox, Baltimore Orioles, Atlanta Braves, Oakland Athletics, Pittsburgh Pirates, Cincinnati Reds, Miami Marlins, and Cleveland Indians. In international competition, he plays for Team Israel, and competed for them in the World Baseball Classic and in the Olympics.

Lavarnway attended Yale University, where in 2007 he won the National Collegiate Athletic Association (NCAA) batting title by hitting .467 and led the NCAA with an .873 slugging percentage. That year, Lavarnway also set the Ivy League record with a 25-game hitting streak. In addition, he set the Ivy League all-time career home run record, with 33.

Lavarnway was drafted by the Red Sox in 2008. In 2009, he led the South Atlantic League with 59 extra-base hits. Next season, he was a Carolina League Mid-Season and Post-Season All Star; additionally, he was named the Red Sox co-Minor League Offensive Player of the Year. In 2011, after Lavarnway hit 30 home runs in 478 minor league at bats, Baseball America named him the best power prospect in the International League. He was also named to their 2011 Minor League All-Star Team, and the Red Sox organization named him co-winner of their Offensive Player of the Year award for the second season in a row.

He was called up to the major leagues by the Red Sox in August 2011, making headlines in September when he hit two home runs in his first start as a catcher. Entering the 2012 season Lavarnway was the No. 9 prospect in the Red Sox system according to Baseball America. That season, he was the International League (IL) All Star starting catcher and a post-season IL All-Star. He played 46 games for Boston in 2012, batting .157. He split 2013 between Pawtucket and Boston, batting .299 in 25 games for the major league club. In 2014 with Pawtucket, Lavarnway led the team to the International League title, and was voted MVP of the IL series. However, he was hitless in 10 at bats for Boston, who designated him for assignment after the year.

Lavarnway began the 2015 season with the Baltimore Orioles but only played 10 games for them before getting designated for assignment on May 26. Signed by the Atlanta Braves, he served as A. J. Pierzynski's backup starting on June 15; though he spent the rest of the season with Atlanta, he only appeared in 27 games for them. Failing to make the Braves' roster in 2016, he spent most of the season in the minor leagues for the Toronto Blue Jays. Lavarnway received international honors in 2017, getting named Pool A MVP after playing for Team Israel at the 2017 World Baseball Classic. In the major leagues that year, he got into six games with the Oakland Athletics. He was a 2018 mid-season Triple-A All Star for the Indianapolis Indians. Called up by the Pittsburgh Pirates at the end of 2018, he had four hits in six at bats. Lavarnway started 2019 in the minor leagues again but was called up by the Reds in July. In his debut for the team on July 19, he became the first Red with six RBIs in his Cincinnati debut since RBIs became a statistic in 1920. However, he only played five games for the Reds before they returned him to the minor leagues. In November 2019, he obtained Israeli citizenship, hoping to play for Team Israel in baseball at the 2020 Summer Olympics. He played for Team Israel at the 2020 Summer Olympics in Tokyo in the summer of 2021, and his slugging percentage of .700 was 5th-highest at the Olympic Games. He signed a minor league contract with the Miami Marlins in December. He played for Team Israel in the 2023 World Baseball Classic.

== Early life ==
Lavarnway was born on August 7, 1987, in Burbank, California, and grew up in Woodland Hills, California. Born to a Jewish mother and a Catholic father, Lavarnway celebrated Chanukah growing up but never had a Bar Mitzvah. Starting in high school, Lavarnway began pursuing the Jewish faith more seriously. "I felt spiritually attracted and I began to attend synagogue," he said of his high school days.

From watching his father play softball games, Lavarnway developed an interest in baseball at a young age. He played catcher in Little League, and his favorite major league player growing up was Jason Varitek. At El Camino Real High School, Lavarnway caught at first but later played outfield for the "Conquistadors" baseball team as a senior. The team retired his jersey in 2018.

== College career ==
Lavarnway attended Yale University, where he majored in philosophy and played baseball for the Yale Bulldogs in the Ivy League. Lavarnway chose Yale because "obtaining good grades was important and [Yale] had a strong academic reputation," he said. In 2006, he primarily played right field, earning Ivy Player and Rookie of the Week honors that March.

In 2007, Lavarnway moved back to catcher. "I knew it would provide the best opportunity to reach the major leagues," Lavarnway said, explaining he did not have enough speed in the outfield. He led the National Collegiate Athletic Association (NCAA) in batting average (.467) and slugging percentage (.873), setting Yale single-season records in those categories as well as in home runs (14) and runs batted in (RBIs). His 25-game hitting streak set an Ivy League record, and he earned the G.H. Walker, Jr. Award for being the team's Most Valuable Player (MVP). Following the college season, Lavarnway played for the Manchester Silkworms in the New England Collegiate Baseball League in the summer of 2007, batting .313 for the team. He was honored as a starter on the league All Star team, also competing in the home run derby.

In 2008, his junior year, Lavarnway was the Ivy League's leader in home runs (13), RBIs (42), walks (29), slugging percentage (.824), and on-base percentage (.541). He also batted .398. He missed the last 11 games of the year after breaking the scaphoid bone in his left wrist while diving into home plate in April. Even though he missed some playing time, Lavarnway set the Ivy League record with 33 home runs during his time at Yale. Lavarnway was a semi-finalist for the Johnny Bench Award and the Golden Spikes Award, in addition to being named Second-Team All-Ivy. In 120 total games for Yale, he had a .384 batting average, 33 home runs, and 122 RBIs.

In 2012, Craig Breslow (also Jewish) and Lavarnway became the first Yale players to be Major League teammates since 1949, and the first All-Yale battery in the major leagues since 1883. Lavarnway left the university 11 credits short of graduating, and wants to return to Yale to finish his philosophy degree.

== Career ==
=== Boston Red Sox ===
==== 2008–09 ====
Lavarnway was drafted by the Boston Red Sox in the 6th round of the 2008 Major League Baseball draft. He signed for a $325,000 signing bonus, though he vowed to later study the extra year he needed to complete his degree. Once projected to be drafted higher, his status had fallen after he broke his left wrist in April 2008, causing him to more strongly consider remaining at Yale for his senior year. He played his first professional baseball for the Lowell Spinners of the Class A short season New York-Penn League, batting .211 with two home runs and nine RBIs in 22 games.

In 2009, Lavarnway played for the Greenville Drive in the Class A South Atlantic League, with whom he started using a bigger bat. He hit 21 home runs (a team all-time record) and posted a .540 slugging percentage; in both these categories, he led all Red Sox minor league players. Additionally, he recorded 36 doubles (a team record), a league-leading 59 extra-base hits, and 87 RBIs (second in the league) in 404 at bats.

==== 2010 ====
Lavarnway split 2010 between the Salem Red Sox of the Class A+ Carolina League, and the Portland Sea Dogs of the Class AA Eastern League, combining for 22 home runs (second among Red Sox minor leaguers; his 14 homers in his Carolina League stint led the league), 102 RBIs (first in the Red Sox system, and 11th among all minor leaguers), and a .489 slugging percentage (tops among Red Sox minor leaguers) in 462 at bats. He was a Carolina League Player of the Week (April 19), Mid-Season All Star, and Post-Season All Star. In the Eastern League, he won Player of the Week honors for the week ending August 30. He was leading the league in homers, RBIs, and runs at the time of his promotion. For 2010, he was named the Red Sox co-Minor League Offensive Player of the Year, along with first baseman Anthony Rizzo. He also threw out 33% of attempted base-stealers and was rated as the top Red Sox catching prospect by Baseball America. After the regular season ended, Lavarnway also played for the Peoria Javelinas in the Arizona Fall League (AFL). He was named an "AFL Rising Star" in November.

==== 2011 ====
Lavarnway started the 2011 season with Portland before getting promoted to the Pawtucket Red Sox in the Class AAA International League on June 13. At Pawtucket, he batted third in the lineup. With Portland, he hit 14 home runs with a .510 slugging percentage in 208 at bats, and with Pawtucket he hit 18 home runs with a .612 slugging percentage in 227 at bats. That was good for a combined total of 30 home runs (tied for fourth-most in the minors) and 93 RBIs in 435 at bats.

Lavarnway was voted the International League Player of the Week for the week ending July 25 and received Topps Minor League Player of the Month honors for July. Baseball America named Lavarnway the best power prospect in the International League, and the Red Sox organization named him a co-winner of their Offensive Player of the Year award. Defensively, through mid-August he had made only one error behind the plate. Baseball America named him the catcher on its 2011 Minor League All-Star Team, and MLB.com ranked him the No. 93 prospect in Major League Baseball.

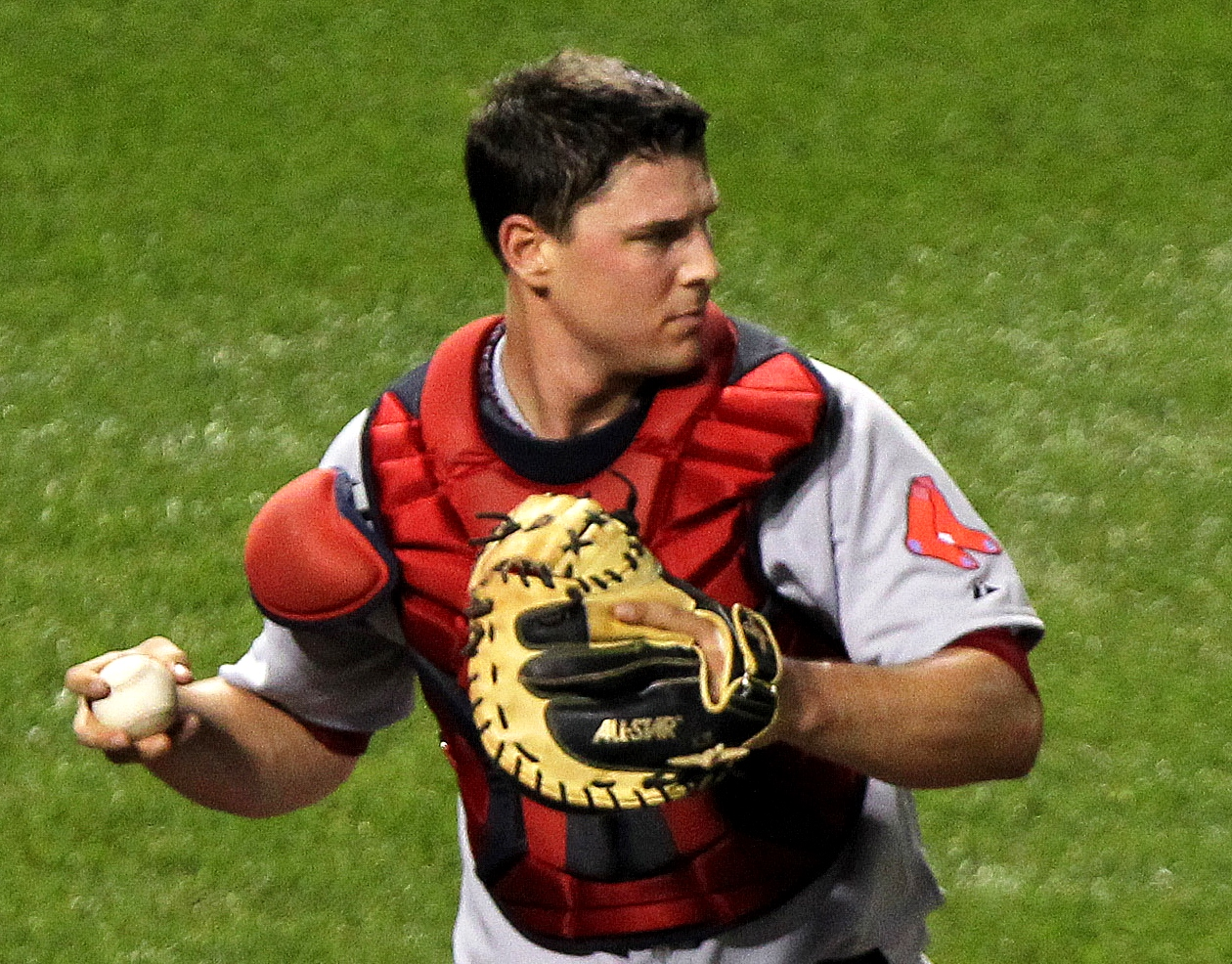
Ryan Lavarnway with the Boston Red Sox in 2011

In 2011, former major leaguer Ken Ryan compared Lavarnway to Mike Lieberthal, whose offensive ability was far ahead of his catching ability when he first made it to the major leagues, but who over time established himself as a defensive catcher as well. On August 18, Lavarnway was called up to the Red Sox. He filled the roster spot of Kevin Youkilis, who went on the disabled list. The next day, August 19, he collected his first career hit, a single off of Jeff Francis of the Kansas City Royals.

On September 27, with both Jason Varitek and Jarrod Saltalamacchia injured, Lavarnway started for the Red Sox and hit his first two major league home runs, recording four RBIs in a key 8–7 victory over the Baltimore Orioles. Lavarnway became the third player in major league baseball history to hit two home runs in his first start at catcher, joining Bobby Pfeil (1971) and J. P. Arencibia (2010). In 17 games for Boston in 2011, Lavarnway batted .231 with nine hits, two home runs, and eight RBI.

==== 2012 ====
Entering the 2012 season, Lavarnway was named the No. 9 prospect in the Red Sox system by Baseball America. That season, he was the International League All-Star starting catcher and also a post-season IL All-Star. In 83 games with Pawtucket, he batted .295 with eight home runs and 43 RBI.

On August 1, Lavarnway was called up from Pawtucket when Daniel Nava was placed on the 15-day disabled list. He remained with Boston the rest of the season, receiving regular playing time at catcher and also as a designated hitter. With the Red Sox and the Seattle Mariners tied at three runs apiece on September 4, Lavarnway hit a home run against Blake Beavan, providing the margin of victory in a 4–3 win that snapped a seven-game losing streak for Boston. On September 14, he had four RBIs, including a three-run home run against Aaron Laffey, as the Red Sox defeated the Toronto Blue Jays by a score of 8–5. Lavarnway played 46 games for the Red Sox in 2012, batting .157 with two home runs and 12 RBI. Though his caught stealing percentage was 32% at Pawtucket, it was 10% with Boston.

==== 2013 ====
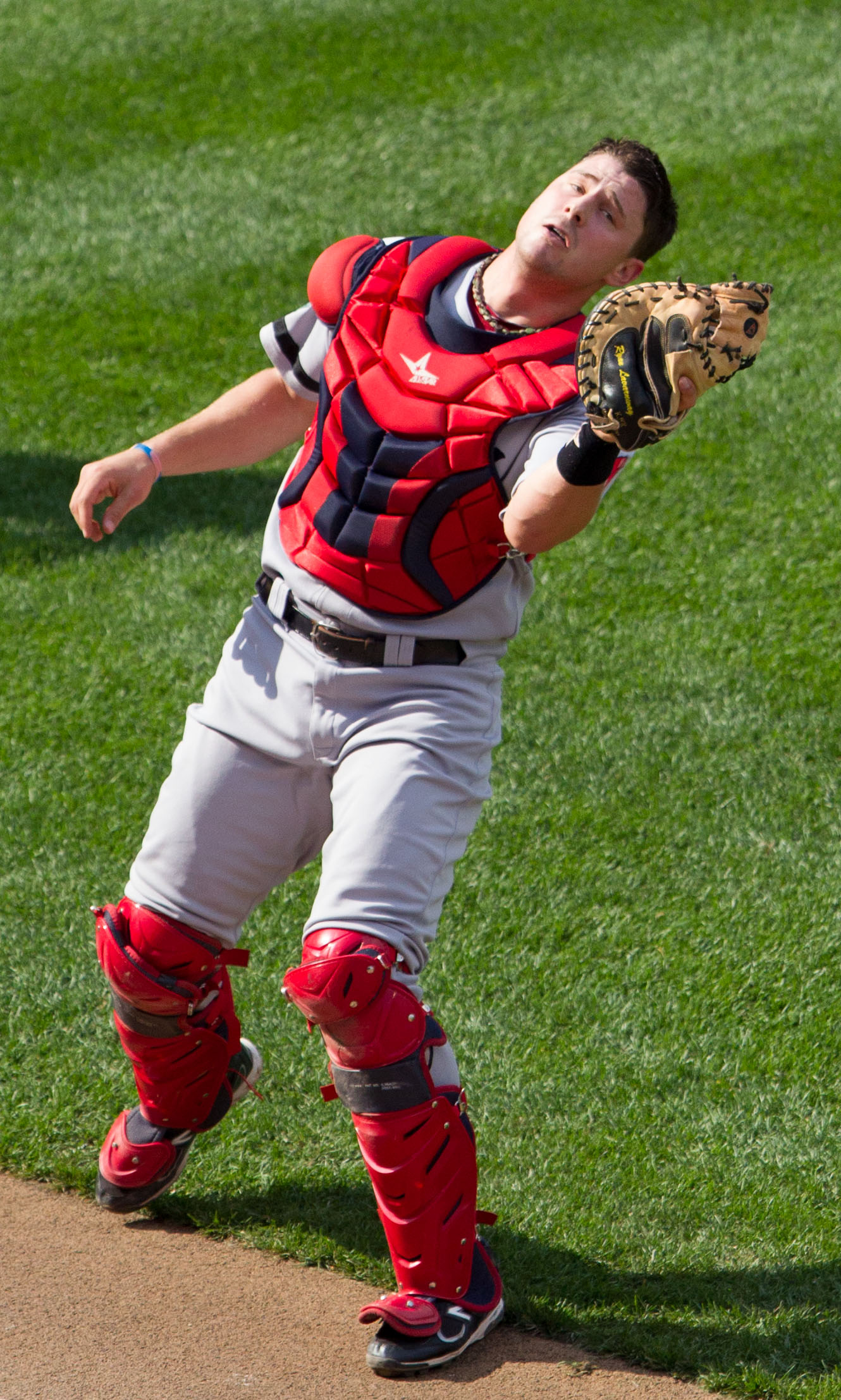
Lavarnway catches a pop fly.

On March 27, 2013, the Red Sox optioned Lavarnway to Pawtucket. Manager John Farrell said: "Right now he needs 'everyday' at-bats." Commenting on Lavarnway having been timed at 1.9 seconds throwing out a runner trying to steal second, Farrell said, "More than acceptable at the big league level." Lavarnway was recalled to Boston on April 25 but was optioned back on April 28 to make room for John Lackey's return from the disabled list without having made an appearance. Larvarnway was called up again on May 12 after David Ross was placed on the 7-day disabled list with a concussion. He appeared in three games this time before getting optioned to Pawtucket again on May 24.

He was called up for a third time on June 18 after Ross was again placed on the 7-day disabled list with a concussion. On August 6, while catching knuckleballer Steve Wright in his first major league start, Lavarnway tied a Major League record with four passed balls in one inning. The record was set by Ray Katt of the New York Giants in 1954, catching knuckleballer Hoyt Wilhelm, and tied by Gino Petralli of the Texas Rangers in 1987, catching knuckleballer Charlie Hough. Lavarnway was sent back to Pawtucket on August 19 when Ross returned from the disabled list, but it was only for a couple weeks before he was recalled in September as part of September call-ups. Overall in 2013, he batted .299 in 25 regular season games for Boston, with one home run and 14 RBI. With Pawtucket in 2013, he batted .250 with three home runs and 24 RBI. With Pawtucket, he threw out 18 of 45 attempted base stealers (40.0%), the 4th-best percentage among International League catchers. However, he only threw out 19% of would-be base stealers in the major leagues.

==== 2014 ====
In the spring of 2014 Lavarnway was tutored to play first base by infield instructor Brian Butterfield. Lavarnway started the 2014 season in Pawtucket, where he batted .265 with two home runs and 11 RBIs in 44 games before getting recalled by Boston on May 26. He started at first base for the first time in the major leagues on May 29 against the Atlanta Braves but left the game early with left wrist soreness. The next day, he was placed on the 15-day disabled list after an MRI revealed a broken hamate bone in the wrist. He had surgery to remove the hamate bone from his left wrist at the Cleveland Clinic on June 4 and began a rehab assignment with Portland on July 21. Moved up to Pawtucket on July 25, Lavarnway was eventually optioned to Pawtucket, not rejoining the Red Sox until September. With Pawtucket, Lavarnway led the team to the International League title, earning Governor's Cup MVP honors after earning 10 hits in 22 at bats. Promoted by the Red Sox after Pawtucket's season ended, he appeared in five games, either as a pinch-hitter or as a first baseman. In nine games with Boston in 2014, Lavarnway had only 10 at bats, going hitless in them. His totals with Pawtucket were a .283 average, three home runs, and 20 RBIs in 62 games. After the season, he was designated for assignment on November 25.

=== Baltimore Orioles ===
The Los Angeles Dodgers claimed Lavarnway off waivers on December 5, 2014. Lavarnway was out of options, and therefore could not be sent to the minor leagues without first clearing waivers. However, he was designated for assignment, then claimed off waivers by the Chicago Cubs on December 19, 2014. Four days later, however, the Cubs also put him on waivers.

Lavarnway changed teams again on December 23, when the Baltimore Orioles – his fourth team in 18 days – claimed him off waivers from the Cubs. Lavarnway was again designated for assignment on January 9. He began the 2015 season on the Orioles' opening day roster. After appearing in only ten games, he was designated for assignment on May 26. Manager Buck Showalter said, "I just don't think Ryan's swing and the things that he's capable of doing are conducive to playing once a week," and indicated that he hoped Lavarnway would accept a Norfolk roster position. Instead, Lavarnway became a free agent. He had batted .107 in 10 games for Baltimore, with no home runs or RBI.

=== Atlanta Braves ===
On May 30, 2015, Lavarnway signed a minor league contract with the Atlanta Braves. Playing for the Triple-A Gwinnett Braves, in 49 plate appearances he recorded a .268 batting average/.388 on-base percentage/.463 slugging percentage with two home runs and eight RBIs. After playing 13 games for Gwinnett, he was called up to the majors on June 15 to replace the struggling Christian Bethancourt. With the Braves, he served as A. J. Pierzynski's backup. On July 11, his home run against Jorge de la Rosa accounted for half of Atlanta's scoring in a 3–2 loss to the Colorado Rockies. In 27 games for Atlanta, he batted .227 with two home runs and six RBIs. He was outrighted off the roster on October 9 but was re-signed to a minor league deal by the organization.

Invited to spring training with the Braves in 2016, Lavarnway failed to make the team and played for Gwinnett, batting .276 with no home runs and 10 RBIs in 25 games. Lavarnway was granted his release on May 15, allowing newly-acquired Anthony Recker to get more playing time with Gwinnett.

=== Toronto Blue Jays ===
On May 27, 2016, Lavarnway signed a minor league contract with the Toronto Blue Jays and was assigned to the Double–A New Hampshire Fisher Cats. In 66 games for New Hampshire, he batted .262/.357/.395 with six home runs and 38 RBI. Lavarnway elected free agency following the season on November 7.

=== Oakland Athletics ===
On November 21, 2016, Lavarnway signed a minor league contract with the Oakland Athletics that included an invitation to spring training. He began the 2017 season playing for the Nashville Sounds of the Triple-A Pacific Coast League. He was called up on July 5, appearing in one game before being sent outright back to Nashville on July 11. His contract was selected by the Athletics on July 27 when Josh Phegley went on the disabled list with an oblique injury. This time, he appeared in five games before being designated for assignment on August 5 after the A's added catcher Dustin Garneau. Lavarnway was outrighted to Nashville two days later. He batted .273 for the Athletics, recording three hits in 11 at bats. In 83 games for Nashville, he batted .239 with six home runs and 26 RBIs. He elected free agency after the season.

=== Pittsburgh Pirates ===
On January 22, 2018, Lavarnway signed a minor league deal with the Pittsburgh Pirates. He was invited to spring training. Lavarnway began the 2018 season playing for the Indianapolis Indians of the Class AAA International League, for whom he was a mid-season All Star. He hit .288/.375/.485 in 77 games for Triple-A Indianapolis, was called up to Pittsburgh on September 4, and had four hits in six at bats for the Pirates. He elected free agency on November 3.

=== New York Yankees ===
On November 7, 2018, Lavarnway signed a contract with the New York Yankees, in which he was invited to spring training. In 2019 he played for their Triple–A affiliate, the Scranton/Wilkes-Barre RailRiders, and batted .213/.333/.315 with three home runs and 19 RBI in 108 at bats. The team released him on July 18.

=== Cincinnati Reds ===
Just hours after his release from the Yankees, Lavarnway signed a one-year major league contract with the Cincinnati Reds. The following day on July 19, 2019, he became the first player with six RBI in his Reds debut since RBIs became an official statistic in 1920 and the first player ever to have three or more extra base hits and six or more RBI in his first game with any team (dating back to 1920). He was also the first Reds catcher to have three hits, two home runs, and six RBI in one game since Johnny Bench in 1973. Lavarnway would go on to play a total of five games for the Reds, batting .278 with two home runs and seven RBI. On July 28, Lavarnway was designated for assignment. The Reds subsequently sent him to their Triple–A affiliate, the Louisville Bats, where he batted .225/.319/.500 with three home runs and seven RBI in 40 at–bats before being released on August 29.

=== Cleveland Indians ===
On August 30, 2019, the Cleveland Indians signed Lavarnway to a minor league contract and assigned him to the Triple-A Columbus Clippers, wanting him to compete with Eric Haase for a promotion to the major leagues after the minor league season ended. Lavarnway played four games in the regular season for Columbus, batting .364/.429/.455 in 11 at bats. However, he never played a game for the Indians, as Cleveland chose to call up Haase instead. Lavarnway became a free agent following the season on November 4.

=== Miami Marlins ===
On December 18, 2019, Lavarnway signed a minor league contract with the Miami Marlins with an invitation to spring training. On August 3, 2020, Lavarnway was selected to the active roster. He was designated for assignment on August 21, and then outrighted by the Marlins to their alternate site. At the end of the regular season he was on the Marlins' 12-player "taxi squad". In the coronavirus-shortened 2020 regular season he batted .364/.364/.364 in 11 at bats. Lavarnway elected free agency on October 15, 2020.

=== Cleveland Indians (second stint) ===
On February 19, 2021, Lavarnway was signed to a minor league contract with the Cleveland Indians organization with an invitation to the Indians' 2021 major league spring training camp. He began the season with the Columbus Clippers of the newly-formed Triple-A East. On June 17, the Indians selected Lavarnway's contract, adding him to their active roster. Lavarnway went 3-for-11 in four games with Cleveland before being designated for assignment on June 24. He was outrighted to Triple-A Columbus on June 28. The Indians selected Lavarnway's contract a second time on September 2, 2021. Lavarnway was designated for assignment on September 14, 2021, and subsequently outrighted to Columbus on September 17, 2021.

Lavarnway elected free agency on October 6, 2021.

=== Detroit Tigers ===
On March 14, 2022, Lavarnway signed a minor league deal with the Detroit Tigers. Playing for the Triple-A Toledo Mud Hens in 2022, he batted .281/.385/.459 in 146 at bats.

=== Miami Marlins (second stint) ===
On June 21, 2022, the Tigers traded Lavarnway to the Miami Marlins in exchange for cash considerations. He played for the Triple-A Jacksonville Jumbo Shrimp of the International League. Between the two teams in 2022, he batted .245/.352/.417 in 278 at-bats with 11 home runs and 44 RBIs. Lavarnway elected free agency following the season on November 10.

On March 22, 2023, Lavarnway announced his retirement from professional baseball.

== Team Israel; World Baseball Classic and Olympics ==
Lavarnway played for Israel at the 2017 World Baseball Classic qualifier. Throughout the qualifier, Lavarnway was the starting catcher in all three games while also batting second in all games. In the opening game, Lavarnway went 3-for-4, while scoring a run and walking once, with his one out resulting in a double play. In the second game Lavarnway went hitless in three at bats, while walking once. In the third and final game, Lavarnway hit a two-run home run, as part of a 2-for-5 evening, scoring 2 runs and collecting 3 RBIs.

Lavarnway was the starting catcher for Team Israel at the 2017 World Baseball Classic in the main tournament, in March 2017. After # 41-ranked Israel defeated # 3-ranked South Korea and # 4-ranked Taiwan, Lavarnay noted: "two generations ago, the way that this team was put together would have meant that we were being killed...It means a lot more than that we're here." Lavarnway was named Pool A MVP, after going 5-for-9 (.556/.692/.889) a home run, 3 RBIs, and 4 walks. Over the two rounds that the team played, Lavarnway batted 8-for-18 (.565) with two doubles, a home run, and 6 RBIs, while walking 5 times. Discussing the experience, he observed, "It changed how proud I am about being Jewish."

In November 2019, Lavarnway obtained Israeli citizenship, hoping to play for Team Israel in baseball at the 2020 Summer Olympics in Tokyo.

He played for Team Israel at the 2020 Summer Olympics in Tokyo in the summer of 2021, and his slugging percentage of .700 was 5th-highest at the Olympic Games. He batted .350/.350/.700 in 20 at bats with three runs, two home runs, and three RBIs.

Lavarnway played for Team Israel in the 2023 World Baseball Classic in Miami, Florida, in March 2023. He played under manager Ian Kinsler, and alongside All Star outfielder Joc Pederson and pitcher Dean Kremer, among others.

Lavarnway played catcher for Team Israel in the 2023 European Baseball Championship in September 2023 in the Czech Republic.

== Post-playing career ==
Starting in April 2023, Lavarnway has served as an On-Air Analyst covering the Colorado Rockies for AT&T SportsNet.

On August 23 and August 24, 2023, Lavarnway played for the Rocky Mountain Vibes of the Pioneer League. His appearances came as a "marketing player", which under Pioneer League rules is allowed to play in no more than two games a month.

Lavarnway is currently a roving catching instructor for the Chicago Cubs.

== Personal life ==
In 2013, Lavarnway married chef and food blogger Jamie Neistat, a Denver native who, like Lavarnway, is Jewish. Lavarnway and his wife go to synagogue regularly and live what he describes as a "Jewish lifestyle". "We are proud members of the Jewish community in the city," he says. His cousin, Emma, served in the Israel Defense Forces. In 2020, Lavarnway was inducted into the Southern California Jewish Sports Hall of Fame. Lavarnway and his wife Jamie have one daughter, Blake Elizabeth, born on June 11, 2022.

== See also ==
- List of Jewish Major League Baseball players
