= La Vergne police department sex scandal =

2023 American incident

- Date: January 2023
- Location: La Vergne, Tennessee, U.S.
- Outcome: 6 officers fired, 3 suspended, $500,000 settlement

Beginning in January 2023, the La Vergne Police Department in La Vergne, Tennessee, was hit with allegations of sexual misconduct between employees. At the center of the scandal was officer Maegan Hall, who was alleged to have engaged in sexual relationships with multiple male colleagues on and off duty. The fallout and the attempts at coverup led to the firing of six officers, including police chief Burrel Davis, and the suspension of three others. Hall later filed a federal civil rights lawsuit alleging she was groomed and exploited by her superiors, which the city settled in 2024 for $500,000.

== Discovery and investigation ==
On December 12, 2022, a La Vergne police sergeant alerted city officials to concerns of sexual misconduct at the department. An internal affairs investigation uncovered a broad pattern of misconduct including sex acts occurring on-duty at city facilities. The investigation also found that some officers attempted to coordinate their responses in order to mislead investigators.

The internal report documented several instances of sexual conduct between married officer Hall and male officers, including oral sex performed at the police gym and substation, sharing of nude photographs and propositions for threesomes. Some officers expressed concern about Hall's mental health, including one claim that she had dry-fired her gun at her head to "hear what it sounded like." However, these concerns were not promptly reported.

By early January 2023, the City of La Vergne terminated officer Hall, sergeant Lewis Powell, sergeant Ty McGowan, detective Seneca Shields and officer Juan Lugo-Perez. Officers Patrick Magliocco, Gavin Schoeberl and Larry Holladay were suspended without pay, with Holladay later resigning. Although no criminal charges were filed, the Rutherford County district attorney's office stated that they were monitoring the situation closely. Investigators concluded that the officers had not only violated departmental rules by engaging in sexual activity on duty, but also committed “conduct unbecoming of an officer” and impeded the investigation.

=== Police chief dismissal ===
Police chief Burrel Davis was fired in February 2023 after the third-party investigation found he had knowledge of the misconduct yet failed to take action and that he also attempted impeding the investigation. Davis was reported to have solicited pornographic images of Hall and actively encouraged McGowan to engage in sexually exploitative behaviors like non-consensual sharing of nude photographs and participating in degrading sexual activities. McGowan was also later reported to have intimidated a female assistant in the city's human resources offices by grabbing her neck. Brent Hatcher, who formerly served as the department’s deputy chief, was appointed as interim chief after Davis’ firing. The city then held community meetings in April to gather feedback from residents in search for a new chief. 30-year veteran Christopher Moews was appointed new chief in September.

In December 2024, Davis was decertified by the Tennessee POST commission, barring him from law enforcement work in the state. Shortly afterwards the same month, he was charged with aggravated stalking and violating an order of protection. In 2025, Davis was arrested for felony charges including kidnapping and assault.

== Aftermath ==
=== Litigation ===
Maegan Hall filed a federal lawsuit in February 2023 that alleged she was a victim of sexual harassment and groomed for sexual exploitation under the guise of mentorship and training. Since the sex scandal made national headlines, Hall's lawyers said she was subjected to public ridicule and bad publicity that hurt her attempts to regain employment. In March 2024, the city settled the lawsuit for $500,000, while denying any admission of liability.

=== Maegan Hall ===
In March 2025, the New York Post reported that Maegan Hall had since been laying low, still married and living with her husband, Jedidiah. She was apparently working as a pharmacy technician, a position she had been certified to work in since 2018.
