= Brent Dlugach =

American baseball player (born 1983)

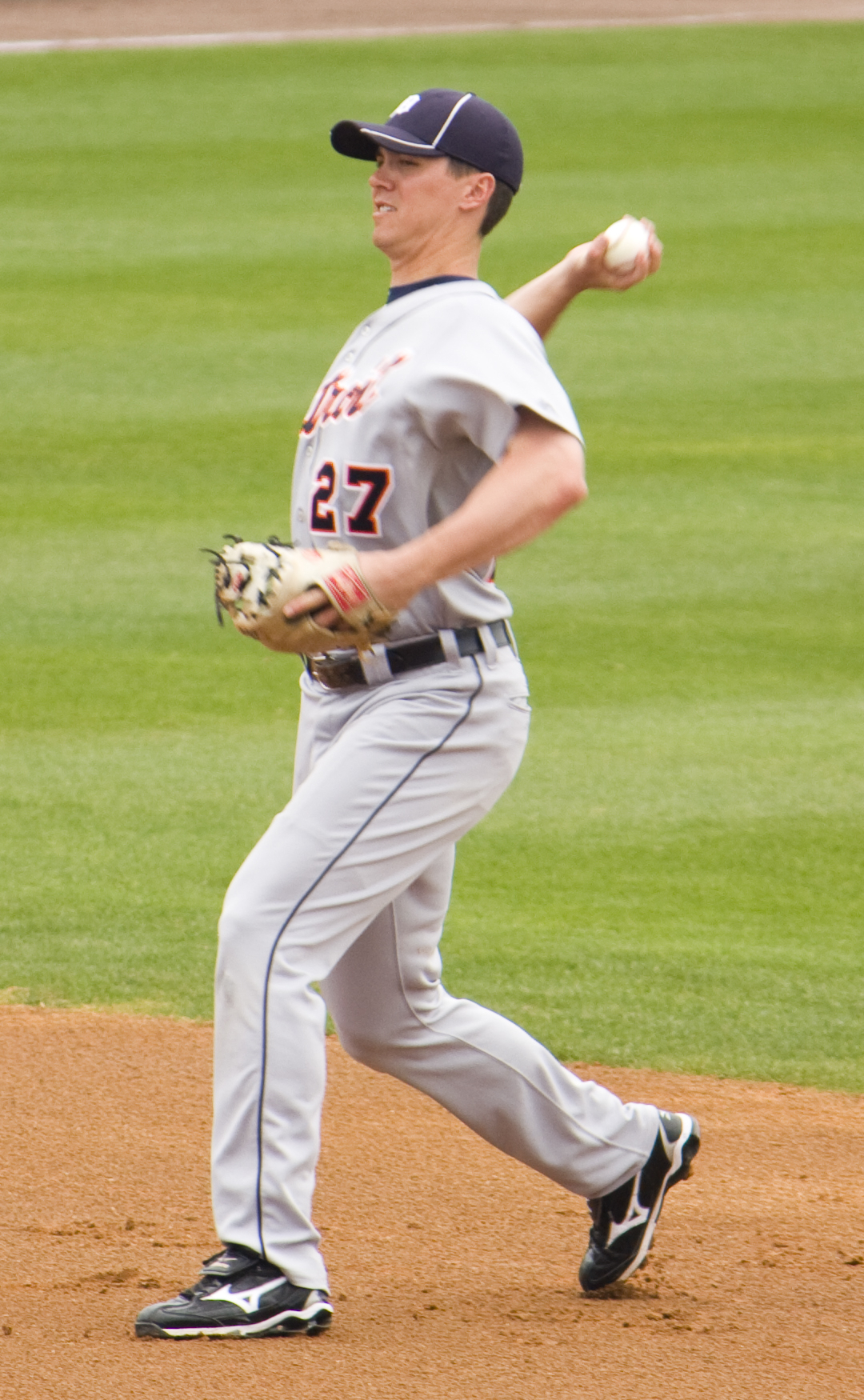
- Dlugach with the Detroit Tigers
- Shortstop
- Born: March 3, 1983 (age 43); Fort Smith, Arkansas, U.S.
- Batted: Right Threw: Right

MLB debut
- September 13, 2009, for the Detroit Tigers

Last MLB appearance
- October 2, 2009, for the Detroit Tigers

MLB statistics
- Batting average: .000
- Home runs: 0
- Runs batted in: 0
- Stats at Baseball Reference

Teams
- Detroit Tigers (2009)

Brent Peter Dlugach (born March 3, 1983) is an American former professional baseball shortstop. He played in Major League Baseball (MLB) for the Detroit Tigers in 2009.

== Career ==
=== Amateur ===
Dlugach played college baseball at the University of Memphis where he was named a second-team Conference USA selection as a junior. In 2003, he played collegiate summer baseball with the Hyannis Mets of the Cape Cod Baseball League.

=== Detroit Tigers ===
Dlugach was selected by the Tigers in the 6th round of the 2004 Major League Baseball draft. He played in Single-A from 2004–06 and was promoted to Triple-A Toledo Mud Hens late in 2006 and played in all of Toledo's playoff games. Dlugach missed most of the 2007 and 2008 minor league seasons after injuring his shoulder. In 2009, Dlugach spent the majority of the season at Toledo and was named to the International League All-Star team.

Dlugach was called up to the Tigers on September 1, 2009, when the MLB rosters expanded.

=== Boston Red Sox ===
On November 4, 2010, Dlugach was traded from the Tigers to the Boston Red Sox for a player to be named later or cash. On December 21, 2010, he was designated for assignment by the Boston Red Sox to make room for Bobby Jenks.

=== Detroit Tigers (second stint) ===
On February 2, 2012, Dlugach signed a minor league contract with the Tigers and was assigned to Double-A Erie. He was promoted to Triple-A Toledo on April 3. He was let go following the 2012 campaign and has yet to sign with another club.
