= Alvernia =

Alvernia may refer to:

- Auvergne, France, in Italian
- Alvernia University, a private university in Reading, Pennsylvania, US
- Mount Alvernia, highest point in the Bahamas
- Mount Alvernia Hospital, a private hospital in Singapore
- Camp Alvernia, a day camp in Centerport, New York
