= Lavergne =

Lavergne may refer to:

== People ==
- Armand Lavergne (1880–1935), Canadian politician and lawyer
- Célia de Lavergne (born 1979), French politician
- Chris Lavergne, American media strategist and businessperson
- Didier Lavergne, French make-up artist
- Gary Lavergne (born 1955), American author
- Gerard Lavergne (born 1999), Dominican footballer
- Gordon Lavergne (1910–1970), Canadian politician
- Joseph Lavergne (1847–1922), Canadian politician
- Louis Lavergne (1845–1931), Canadian politician
- Mady Humbert-Lavergne (née Humbert) (1898–1987), French ethnomusicologist and composer also known as "Melle Lavergne"
- Pascal Lavergne (born 1967), French politician
- Régis Lavergne (born 1974), French tennis player

== Places ==
=== Canada ===
- Lavergne River, a river of Quebec

=== France ===
- Lavergne, Lot, a commune in the Lot department
- Lavergne, Lot-et-Garonne, a commune in the Lot-et-Garonne department

=== United States ===
- LaVergne station, a commuter rail station in Berwyn, Illinois

== See also ==
- La Vergne (disambiguation)
