= Drew Sutton =

American baseball player (born 1983)

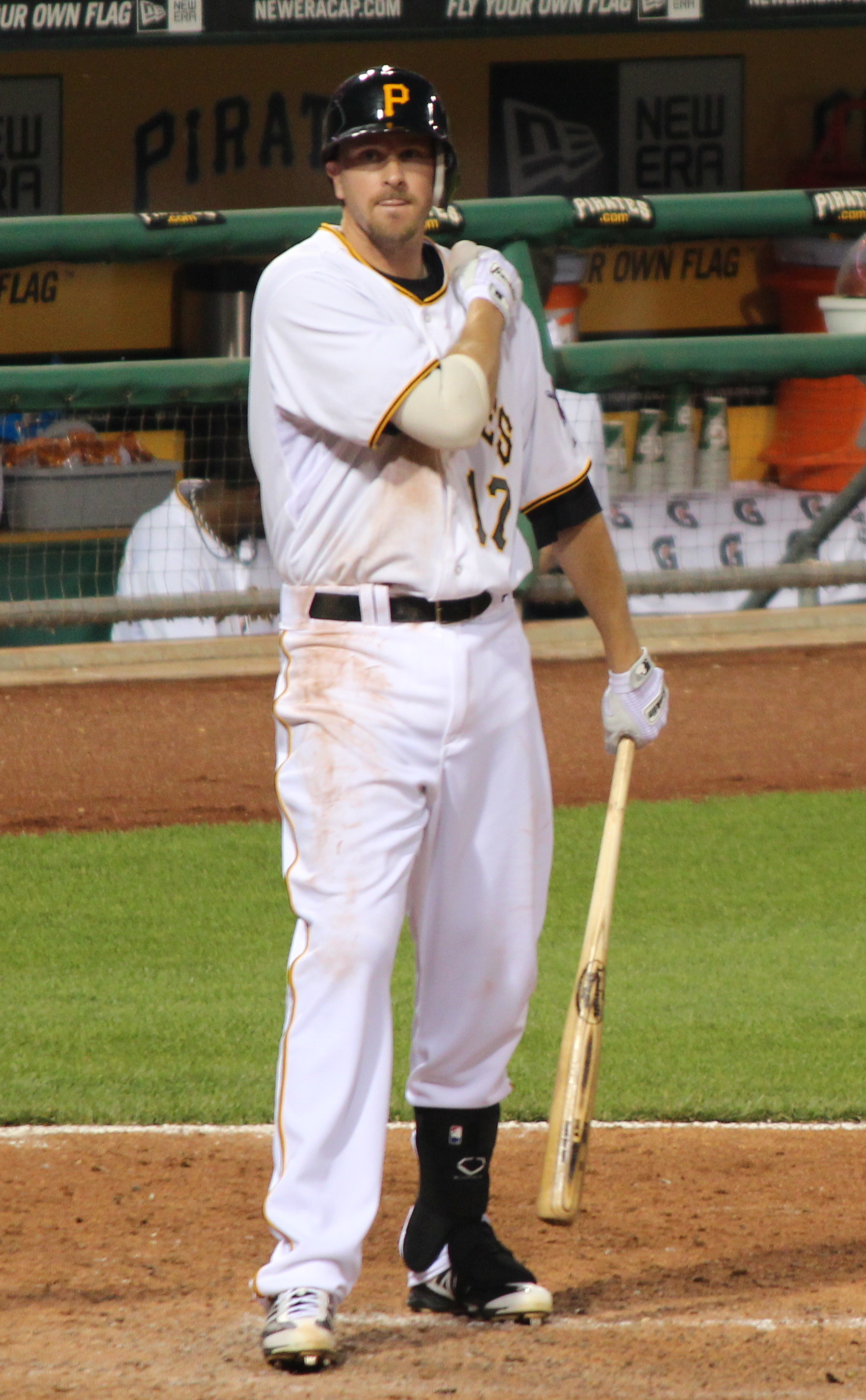
- Sutton during his tenure with the Pittsburgh Pirates in 2012
- Infielder / Outfielder
- Born: June 30, 1983 (age 43); El Dorado, Arkansas, U.S.
- Batted: Switch Threw: Right

MLB debut
- July 2, 2009, for the Cincinnati Reds

Last MLB appearance
- July 30, 2012, for the Pittsburgh Pirates

MLB statistics
- Batting average: .256
- Home runs: 4
- Runs batted in: 37
- Stats at Baseball Reference

Teams
- Cincinnati Reds (2009–2010); Cleveland Indians (2010); Boston Red Sox (2011); Tampa Bay Rays (2012); Pittsburgh Pirates (2012)

Stephen Drew Sutton (born June 30, 1983) is an American former professional baseball infielder and outfielder. He played in Major League Baseball (MLB) for the Cincinnati Reds, Cleveland Indians, Boston Red Sox, Tampa Bay Rays, and Pittsburgh Pirates.

== Career ==
=== Houston Astros ===
Sutton is a graduate of Baylor University. He was drafted by the Houston Astros in the 15th round of the 2004 Major League Baseball draft.

=== Cincinnati Reds ===
Sutton was acquired by the Cincinnati Reds in exchange for Jeff Keppinger during 2009 Spring Training. He made his majorleague debut for the Reds on July 2, 2009.

=== Cleveland Indians ===
On August 6, 2010, Sutton was claimed off waivers by the Cleveland Indians.

Sutton was outrighted by the Indians to the Triple-A Columbus Clippers on November 3, 2010. He refused his minor league assignment and subsequently filed for free agency.

=== Boston Red Sox ===
Sutton signed a minor league contract with the Boston Red Sox on November 22, 2010. On May 20, 2011, the Red Sox selected Sutton's contract, adding him to their active roster.

=== Atlanta Braves ===
On November 22, 2011, Sutton signed a minor league contract with the Atlanta Braves organization.

=== Pittsburgh Pirates ===
The Pittsburgh Pirates purchased Sutton from the Braves on May 20, 2012.

=== Tampa Bay Rays ===
The Tampa Bay Rays traded for Sutton on May 21, 2012, in exchange for a player to be named later or cash considerations. On June 22, Sutton was designated for assignment by the Rays.

=== Pittsburgh Pirates (second stint) ===
Sutton was re-acquired by the Pittsburgh Pirates on June 24, 2012, this time off waivers. On July 3, Sutton hit his first career walk-off home run, solo home run off of Wesley Wright. In October, Sutton elected minor league free agency.

=== Boston Red Sox (second stint) ===
Sutton signed with the Boston Red Sox in December 2012. Sutton spent 2013 with the Triple-A Pawtucket Red Sox, and began the year at third base before being moved to first base in May and finishing the year there. In 102 games, he hit .245 with two home runs and 48 RBI. He also pitched in three additional games, going 0-2 while giving up five runs in five innings and striking out two.

Sutton announced his retirement from professional baseball on February 17, 2014.
