= Riccardo Ingram =

American baseball player (1966–2015)

- Outfielder
- Born: September 10, 1966; Douglas, Georgia, U.S.
- Died: March 31, 2015 (aged 48); Lilburn, Georgia, U.S.
- Batted: Right Threw: Right

MLB debut
- June 26, 1994, for the Detroit Tigers

Last MLB appearance
- July 30, 1995, for the Minnesota Twins

MLB statistics
- Batting average: .194
- Home runs: 0
- Hits: 6
- Runs batted in: 3
- Stats at Baseball Reference

Teams
- Detroit Tigers (1994); Minnesota Twins (1995)

Riccardo Benay Ingram (September 10, 1966 – March 31, 2015) was an American professional baseball player. He played for the Detroit Tigers and the Minnesota Twins of Major League Baseball. At the time of his death, Ingram was serving as a roving instructor in the Twins Minor League system.

== Career ==
His career is profiled in the book, "Journeymen: 24 Bittersweet Tales of Short Major League Sports Careers."

Ingram played baseball and football at Georgia Tech where he stood out in both sports winning the McKelvin Award as the ACC athlete of the year, the first Yellow Jacket to win that award.

Upon leaving Georgia Tech, Ingram was drafted by the Detroit Tigers in the 4th Round (105th overall) of the 1987 Major League Baseball draft. He made his debut with the Tigers in 1994 getting 5 hits in 23 at bats in only 12 games played. After the 1994 season he was granted free agency. On January 26, 1995, he signed a free agent contract with the Minnesota Twins. He played in 4 games in 1995 gathering 1 hit in 8 at-bats. After the season, he signed another free agent contract with the San Diego Padres but did not play in any regular season games for them.

In the minor leagues Ingram compiled a .276 batting average, with 74 home runs and 428 RBI over 9 seasons. In 1995, he won the Triple A batting crown with the Salt Lake Buzz with a .348 average.

After his playing career was over Ingram became a coach in the Twins minor league system. He coached in Ft. Wayne (1998), Quad City (1999), Ft. Myers (2000–2002), and New Britain (2003–2007 (serving as the team's manager in 2006 and 2007)) before being promoted to Rochester as the Red Wing's new hitting coach.

In 2009, Ingram was diagnosed with brain cancer and returned to coaching following six weeks of radiation therapy. The cancer returned in 2014 and Ingram died on March 31, 2015, at the age of 48.

Preceded by Stan Cliburn	New Britain Rock Cats manager 2006–2007	Succeeded by Bobby Cuellar
