= Danny Valencia =

American-Israeli baseball player (born 1984)

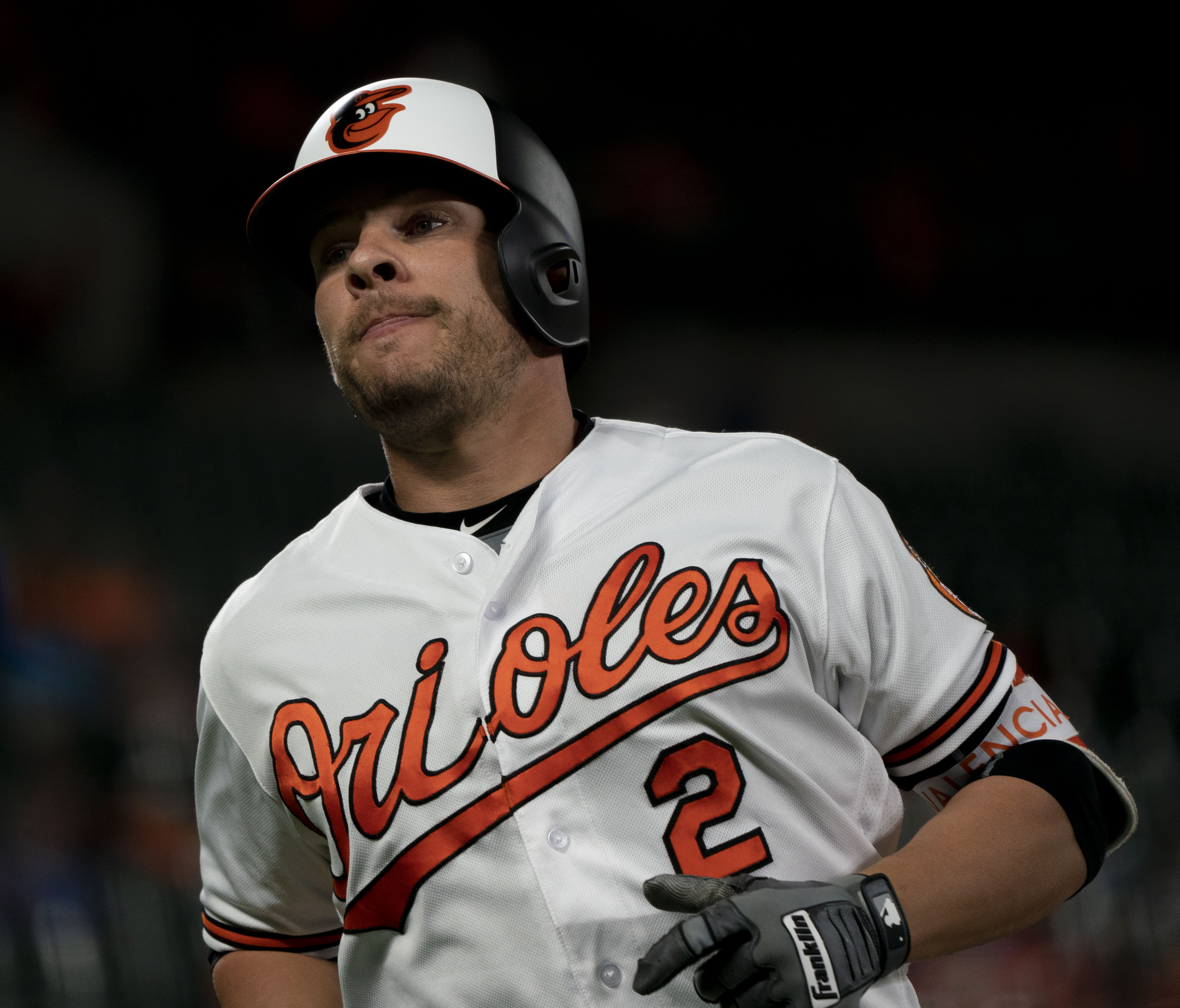
- Valencia with the Baltimore Orioles in 2018
- Third baseman
- Born: September 19, 1984 (age 42); Miami, Florida, U.S.
- Batted: Right Threw: Right

MLB debut
- June 3, 2010, for the Minnesota Twins

Last MLB appearance
- August 8, 2018, for the Baltimore Orioles

MLB statistics
- Batting average: .268
- Home runs: 96
- Runs batted in: 397
- Stats at Baseball Reference

Teams
- Minnesota Twins (2010–2012); Boston Red Sox (2012); Baltimore Orioles (2013); Kansas City Royals (2014); Toronto Blue Jays (2014–2015); Oakland Athletics (2015–2016); Seattle Mariners (2017); Baltimore Orioles (2018)
Medals
Men's baseball
Representing Israel
European Baseball Championship
Silver medal – second place	2021 Turin	Team

Daniel Paul Valencia (Hebrew: דני ולנסיה; born September 19, 1984) is an American-Israeli professional baseball player who currently plays for the Israel national baseball team. He has played in Major League Baseball (MLB) for the Minnesota Twins, Boston Red Sox, Baltimore Orioles, Kansas City Royals, Toronto Blue Jays, Oakland Athletics, and Seattle Mariners.

In high school, Valencia was all-county three times and all-state twice. At the University of North Carolina at Greensboro, he was Southern Conference Freshman of the Year, second-team all-conference, and on his all-regional team. He was drafted while he was a junior at the University of Miami by the Twins in the 19th round of the 2006 Major League Baseball draft, the 576th player overall. In the minors, Valencia was an All-Star in the Appalachian League (2006), the Midwest League (2007), and the Florida State League (2008). He entered the 2010 season ranked as the sixth-best prospect of the Twins by Baseball America.

Valencia made his major league debut with the Twins in June 2010. He was named the third baseman on Baseball America's 2010 All-Rookie Team, and on the 2010 Topps Major League Rookie All-Star Team. In 2011, he led the Twins in RBIs, and led all major league third basemen in assists. In 2013, he batted .371 vs. left-handed pitching, leading the American League, and ranked third in slugging percentage at .639 (minimum 100 plate appearances). In January 2017 Valencia was confirmed to be on the roster for Israel at the 2017 World Baseball Classic; however, when the final roster was released, he was not included. Over the course of his career through 2018, he batted .312/.370/.494 against left-handed pitchers. Through the 2018 season, his 96 home runs placed him 10th on the career all-time list of Jewish major leaguers (directly behind Mike Epstein, and ahead of Joc Pederson), as did his 397 RBIs (tied with Harry Danning, and behind Brad Ausmus).

In September 2019, Valencia obtained Israeli citizenship and joined Team Israel. He played for Team Israel at the 2019 European Baseball Championship. He also played for the team at the Africa/Europe 2020 Olympic Qualification tournament in Italy in September 2019, which Israel won to qualify to play baseball at the 2020 Summer Olympics. He played first base for Team Israel at the 2020 Summer Olympics in Tokyo in the summer of 2021, and tied for the lead at the Olympics with three home runs. He played for Team Israel in the 2023 World Baseball Classic.

== Early life and education ==
Valencia was born in Miami, Florida. His parents are Mindy Valencia, who is Jewish, and Michael Valencia, a Cuban immigrant who converted to Judaism.

Valencia and his sister Laura were raised in Boca Raton, Florida. They were raised Jewish. Acknowledging his uncommon combination of heritage, he has said: "People are shocked at first that I’m Jewish. I get teased in the clubhouse about being Jewish, but we all get teased about something. Going to Hebrew school and being a bar mitzvah … made my mom really happy. I wished I had been out playing baseball, but looking back at it now, I’m happy I did it."

In 1996, Valencia pitched for the Boca Raton Babe Ruth League 12-and-under all-star baseball team that won the Florida state championship. The next year, he pitched and hit for the Boca Lightning 12-and-under travel baseball team that went 27–2 and won the South Florida All-Star Travel League championship. His two key hitting coaches growing up were Bob Molinaro, a family friend who is a former major leaguer and Eastern League manager, and Valencia's mother Mindy.

=== High school ===
Valencia attended Spanish River High School and played shortstop for four years on its Sharks baseball team. He earned South Florida Sun-Sentinel All-County honors as a junior, and was named first team All-Palm Beach County three times and second-team All-State twice. As a junior, in 2002 he was Offensive Player of the Year after hitting .430, and as a senior in 2003 he hit .575.

=== UNC Greensboro ===
Although Valencia had dreamed of playing for the University of Miami, its baseball program did not recruit him, and instead he went to the University of North Carolina at Greensboro, one of two teams that had offered him a full baseball scholarship. In his freshman year, Valencia played third base and batted .338 with a .527 slugging percentage and a team-leading 8 home runs. He was the 2004 Southern Conference Freshman of the Year, and was voted second-team All-Conference.

=== University of Miami ===
Homesick for Florida, Valencia sought to transfer to the University of Miami after his freshman year, even though it only offered him a modest scholarship. UNC-Greensboro initially agreed to release Valencia from his scholarship, but later refused, placing him in jeopardy of losing a year of college eligibility under NCAA Division I rules. He appealed to a university committee which ruled in his favor, allowing him to leave while preserving his eligibility.

During his sophomore year, Valencia played first base for the University of Miami Hurricanes alongside then-third-baseman Ryan Braun. He hit .300 and drove in 63 runs while batting fifth in the lineup, and was named to the All-Regional Team. By his sophomore year of college, he had added 40 pounds. "It's night and day" from UNC-Greensboro, said Valencia. "It's awesome. It's what every Florida kid dreams of. It's the program–the winning, the uniforms. Everything from the strength coach to the facilities is completely different." During the summer of 2005, he played third base for the Anchorage Glacier Pilots in the Alaska Baseball League.

When Braun left to join the Milwaukee Brewers' farm system in 2005, Valencia replaced him at third base for his junior year, batting .324 with a .475 slugging percentage. Valencia hit .312 with 124 runs batted in (RBIs) in 122 games over two years with the Hurricanes, and played in the College World Series. Valencia then played seven games for the Orleans Cardinals in the Cape Cod League in the summer of 2006.

Drafted in the 19th round of the 2006 draft by the Minnesota Twins, the 576th player overall, he skipped his senior year of college to begin his pro career. Valencia was disappointed in his draft position, but said: "realistically, it does not change things for me. My goal has always been to get to the big leagues... It does not matter where you start, but where you finish."

In 2006 when he was drafted by the Twins, he took a leave of absence from college, but promised his parents he would ultimately finish his degree. As of the Fall of 2019, he was taking four online courses and had seven more courses to complete before earning his degree from the University of Miami.

== Minor league career (2006–10) ==
=== 2006–08 ===
In his first professional season, Valencia played first and third base with the Elizabethton Twins. He compiled a .311 batting average (ninth in the league, and fifth in the Twins' organization) and a .505 slugging percentage (sixth in the league), with eight home runs (fourth in the league) and 29 RBIs in 48 games. He was also fifth in the league in at-bats-per-home-run. Valencia was named a 2006 Appalachian League Postseason All-Star, and then batted .364 in the playoffs.

Valencia was selected as a Midwest League All Star in 2007, while playing with the Beloit Snappers, for whom he batted .302/.374/.500 (4th in the league). His Beloit teammates nicknamed him "The Franchise". Manager Jeff Smith lauded him for using the whole field when he batted, and for patience at the plate.

Immediately following the All Star game, he was promoted to the high A Fort Myers Miracle. Valencia earned Florida State League (FSL) "Player of the Week" honors, batting .379 (11–29) with two home runs, three runs scored, and 10 RBIs for the week of July 16. He hit a combined .297/.354/.462 with 17 homers and 66 RBIs at Beloit and Fort Myers.

Again assigned to the Miracle for the first half of 2008, he batted a league-leading .336 with a league-leading 74 hits, and five home runs and 44 RBIs (second in the league), a .402 on-base percentage, and a .518 slugging percentage. Valencia was named a Florida State League All Star, and helped the Miracle capture the FSL 2008 Western Division first half crown. Jim Rantz, director of minor leagues for the Twins, said that he expected Valencia would hit for both power and average.

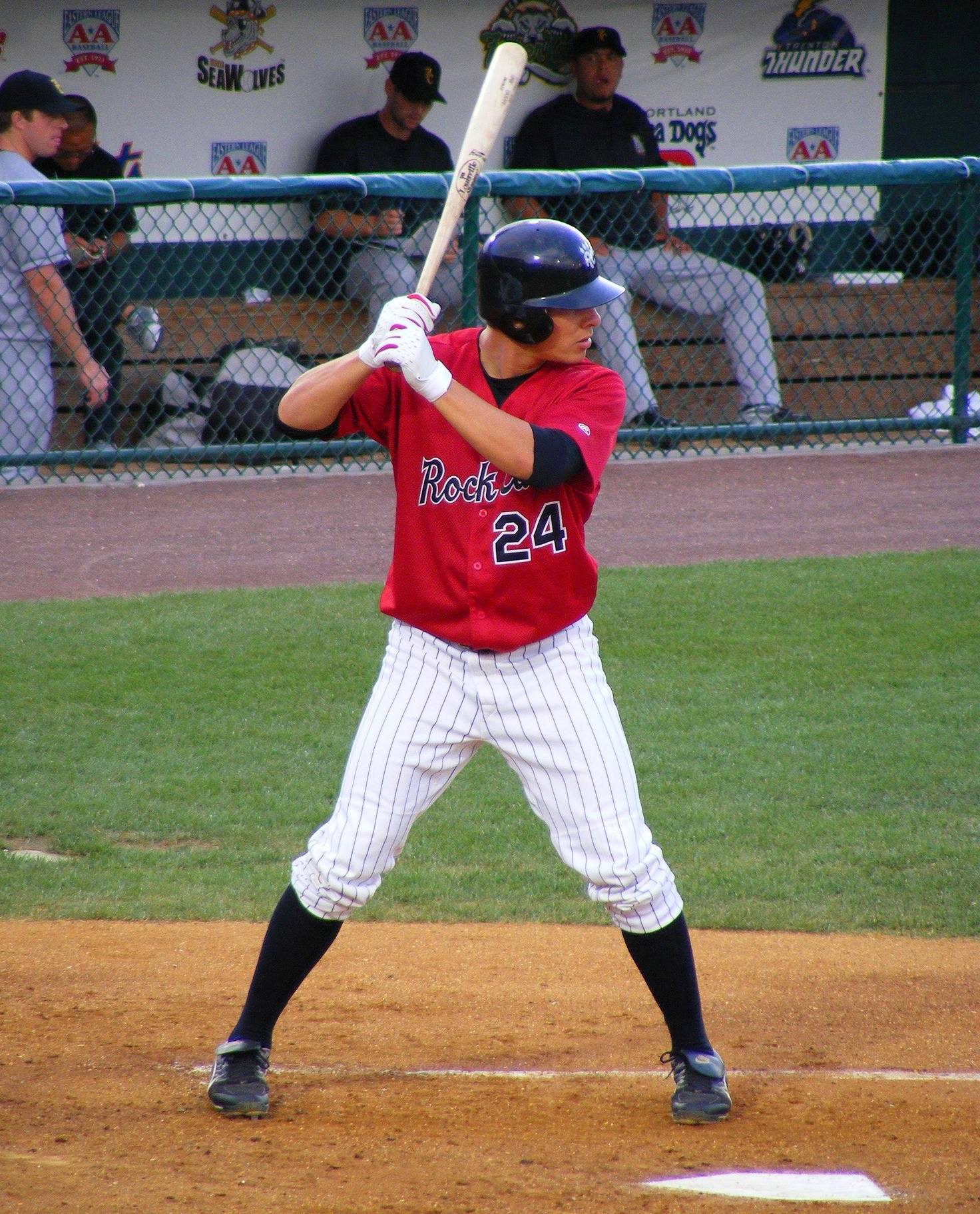
Danny Valencia with the New Britain Rock Cats, 2008

Valencia was promoted to the Twins' Double-A affiliate, the New Britain Rock Cats, for the second half of the season. With the Rock Cats, Valencia batted .289 with 10 home runs and 32 RBIs. Between the two teams, he batted .311 (sixth in the Twins' system), with 15 home runs and 76 RBIs (fourth in the Twins' system).

=== 2009–13 ===
With the Rock Cats to start 2009, he was voted the Eastern League Player of the Week Award for the week ending May 24, after batting .444 with a .778 slugging percentage. Rock Cats manager Tom Nieto said: "Danny's going to be a special player. He's got an electric bat." He hit 38 doubles during the season, tied for the most in the Twins' organization.

Following the season, Valencia played 31 games of winter ball with the Arizona Fall League's Phoenix Desert Dogs. He spent spring training with the Twins in 2009 as a non-roster invitee, batting .429, and was assigned to New Britain following spring training. Baseball America ranked him as the fifth-best prospect in the Twins' organization.

During the 2009 season, Valencia first played for New Britain and was then promoted to the Triple-A Rochester Red Wings. He batted a combined .285 with 14 home runs and 70 RBIs for the two teams. The Twins management indicated that it felt that Valencia would be one of the top position players of the future. On November 20, 2009, he was added to the Twins' 40-man roster. Rantz said: "We're still trying to fill the third-base hole. Eventually ... we're all hoping that [Valencia will] be that guy."

He then played for the Indios de Mayagüez in the Puerto Rico winter league, and as a foreign-born player (of Cuban heritage) for Team Puerto Rico in the Caribbean Series. Twins general manager Bill Smith said in December: "I give Danny Valencia credit. He's down in Puerto Rico right now playing winter ball, and trying to get better.... You always want an underdog guy, somebody to step up when presented with an opportunity." Hector Otero, the Twins scout who signed Valencia and who was the general manager of the Mayagüez club, said: "I think he is a talented player. He definitely can throw. He worked on his defense–worked extra before games–and everyone knows he can swing the bat."

Valencia entered the 2010 season ranked as the Twins' sixth-best prospect by Baseball America. He began 2010 playing third base for Rochester, and was batting .292 in 48 games when he was called up by the parent club.

In 2013, Valencia batted .286 with 14 home runs and 51 RBIs in 262 at bats with the Triple-A Norfolk Tides, and a .531 slugging percentage that would have ranked second in the International League if he had reached the minimum number of at bats.

== Major league career (2010–2018) ==
=== Minnesota Twins (2010–12) ===
Assessing Valencia's hitting during 2010 spring training, Twins manager Ron Gardenhire said: "I guarantee you one thing, he can hit a fastball; and if he sits on a breaking ball, he can hit that, too." On June 3, Valencia was called up to replace Michael Cuddyer, who had been placed on the bereavement list following the death of his father-in-law. In his debut that day, Valencia went 1 for 3.

On July 26, Valencia hit a grand slam off reigning AL Cy Young winner Zack Greinke to record his first big league homer. The feat marked the first time in the 49 years of Twins franchise history that a player's first Major League home run was a grand slam. The game was also his first four-hit performance. The next day, Valencia became the first Twins rookie to have back-to-back games with four hits apiece.

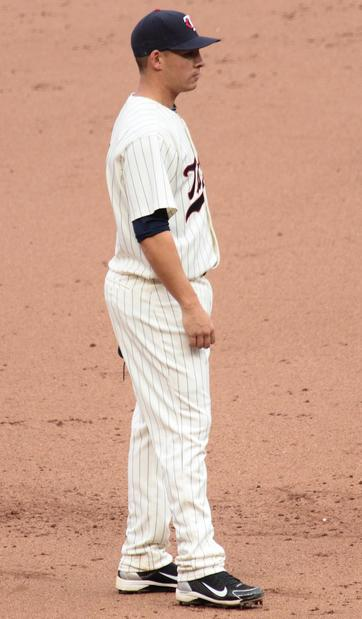
Valencia with the Minnesota Twins at Target Field, 2011

In 2010, Valencia hit .394 with runners in scoring position. That was best in the AL (ahead of Josh Hamilton) among those with at least 75 plate appearances in that situation. On defense, he had the fifth-best fielding percentage among AL third basemen (.973).

For the season, his .311 batting average (the best by a Twins rookie in 46 years; he hit .374 against left-handers), .448 slugging percentage, and .799 OPS were the highest among AL rookies with 300 or more plate appearances. Valencia came in 3rd among AL rookies in hits (93) and total bases (134). In 65 games after the All Star break, he led AL rookies in batting (.311), RBIs (37), and doubles (16).

Valencia was named the third baseman on Baseball America's 2010 All-Rookie Team, and the third baseman on the 2010 Topps Major League Rookie All-Star Team. He was also named the Twins' Most Outstanding Rookie (the Bill Boni Award). He came in third in the voting for 2010 AL Rookie of the Year, with one second-place vote and nine third-place votes.

In 2011, Valencia batted .246 (.309 against left-handers), with 15 home runs and a team-leading 72 RBIs. He also led the team in games played and at bats, and led the AL in games played at third base. On defense, he led the all major league third basemen in assists, with 260.

In 2012, Valencia was replaced by Trevor Plouffe as the team's everyday third baseman after mediocre play during the season. After Plouffe was placed on the DL, Valencia returned to the Twins roster on July 27.

=== Boston Red Sox (2012) ===
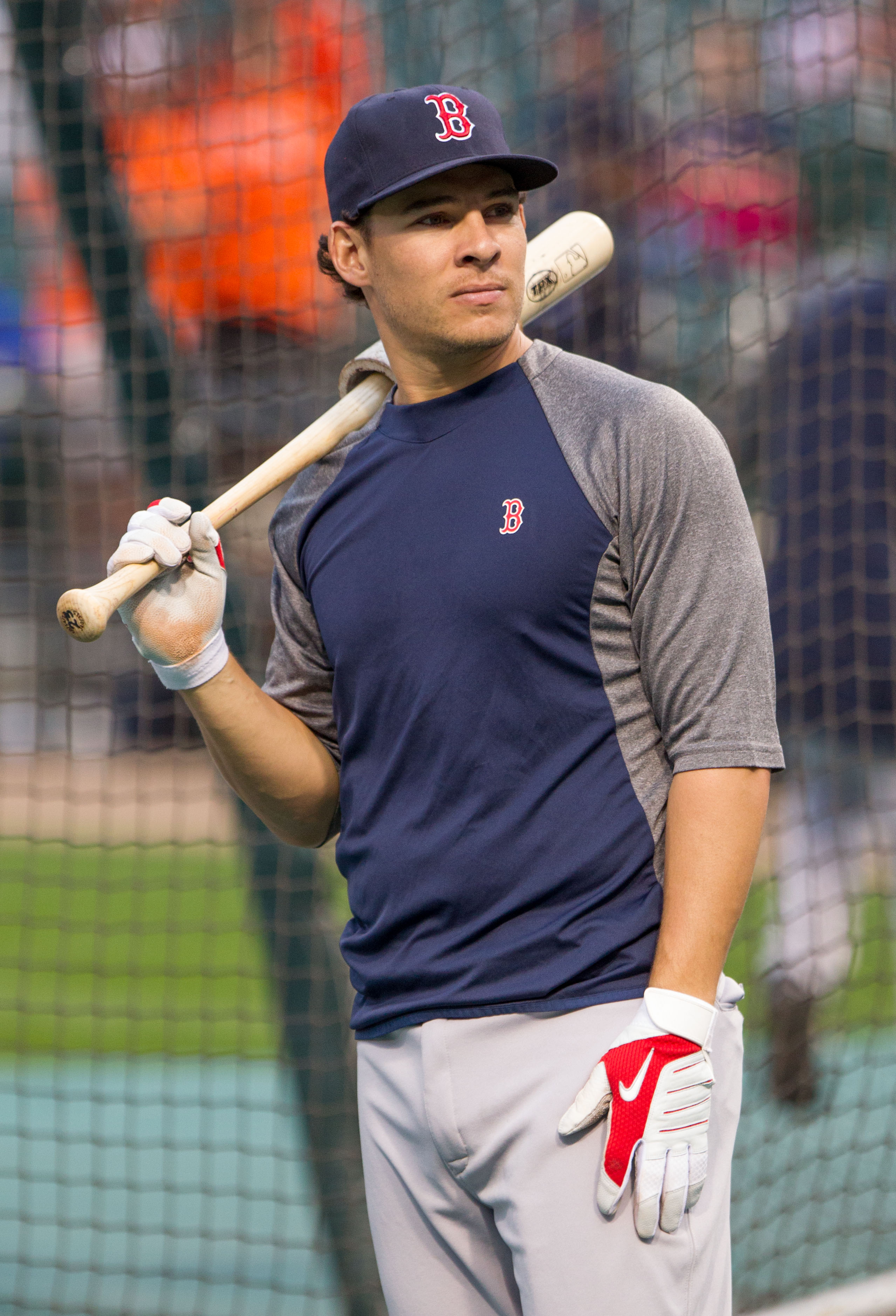
Valencia with the Boston Red Sox, 2012

Valencia was hitting .205 with two home runs with the Twins when he was traded to the Boston Red Sox on August 5. Minnesota received minor league outfielder Jeremias Pineda in return. The Red Sox optioned Valencia to their Triple-A affiliate Pawtucket Red Sox. He was recalled from Pawtucket on August 11 when Will Middlebrooks was placed on the disabled list with a broken right wrist. Valencia was sent back to Pawtucket on August 21, before being recalled again on September 25. He remained with the major league club for the rest of the season, appearing in six games. On November 20, Valencia was designated for assignment along with four other Red Sox players.

=== Baltimore Orioles (2013) ===
Valencia was traded to the Baltimore Orioles for cash considerations eight days later, on November 28, 2012.

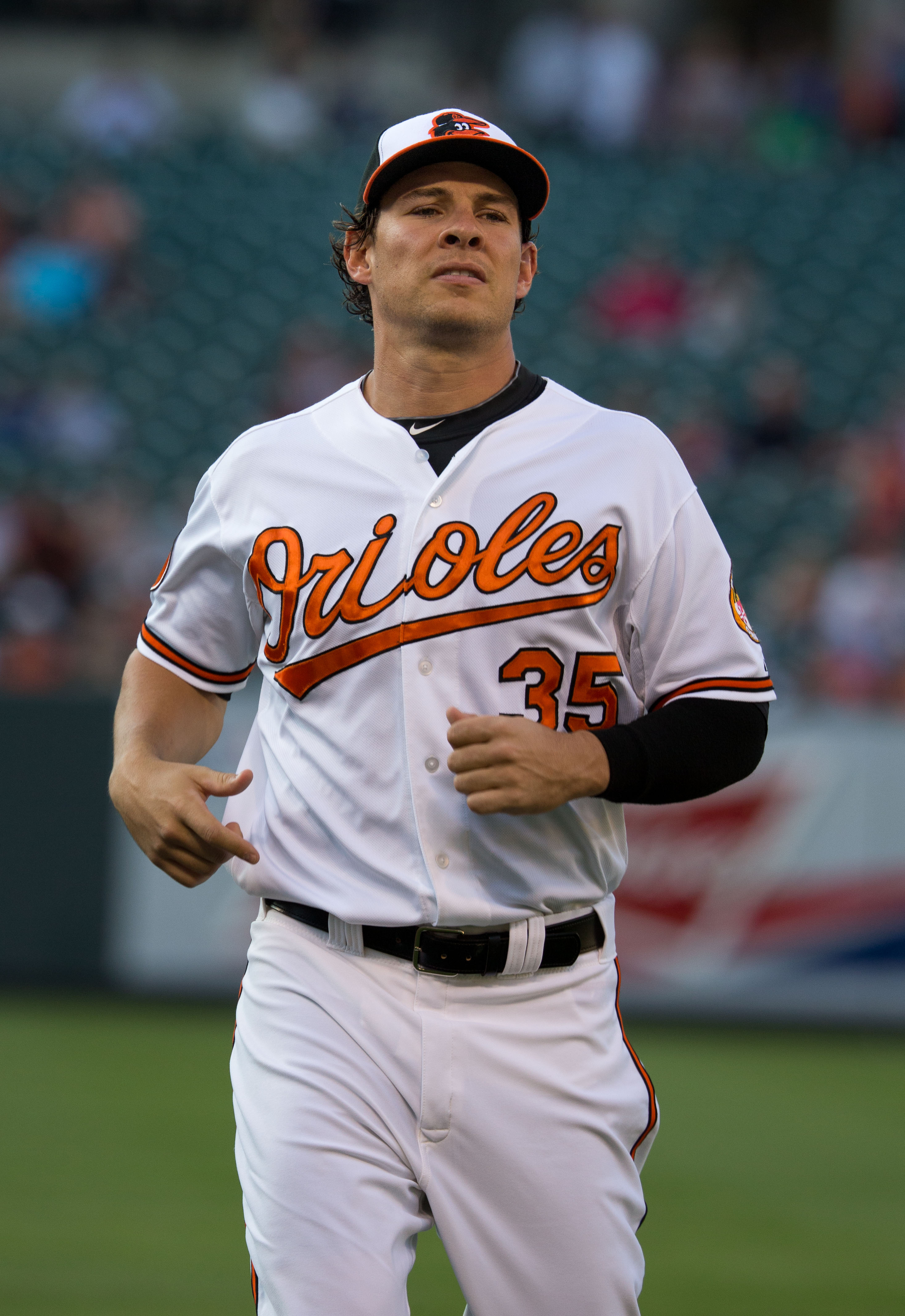
Valencia with the Baltimore Orioles, 2013

Valencia was recalled from the Triple-A Norfolk Tides on August 19, 2013.

He batted .304 for the season, with a .553 slugging percentage. Valencia batted .371 vs. left-handed pitching, leading the American League, and ranked third in slugging percentage at .639 (minimum 100 plate appearances). He excelled at Camden Yards, batting .394/.403/.676 at home.

He was eligible for arbitration after the season. Valencia was traded to the Kansas City Royals for outfielder David Lough on December 18, 2013.

=== Kansas City Royals (2014) ===
On May 22, 2014, Valencia was given the starting third baseman job by the Royals, after hitting .308 in his first 16 games. He batted .282 in 110 at bats, before being traded.

=== Toronto Blue Jays (2014–15) ===
On July 28, 2014, Valencia was traded to the Toronto Blue Jays for pitcher Liam Hendriks and catcher Erik Kratz. In the offseason, Valencia won his salary arbitration case against the Blue Jays, and was awarded a one-year contract worth $1.675 million.

In 2015 for the Blue Jays, he batted .296/.331/.506. On August 1, 2015, Valencia was designated for assignment.

=== Oakland Athletics (2015–16) ===
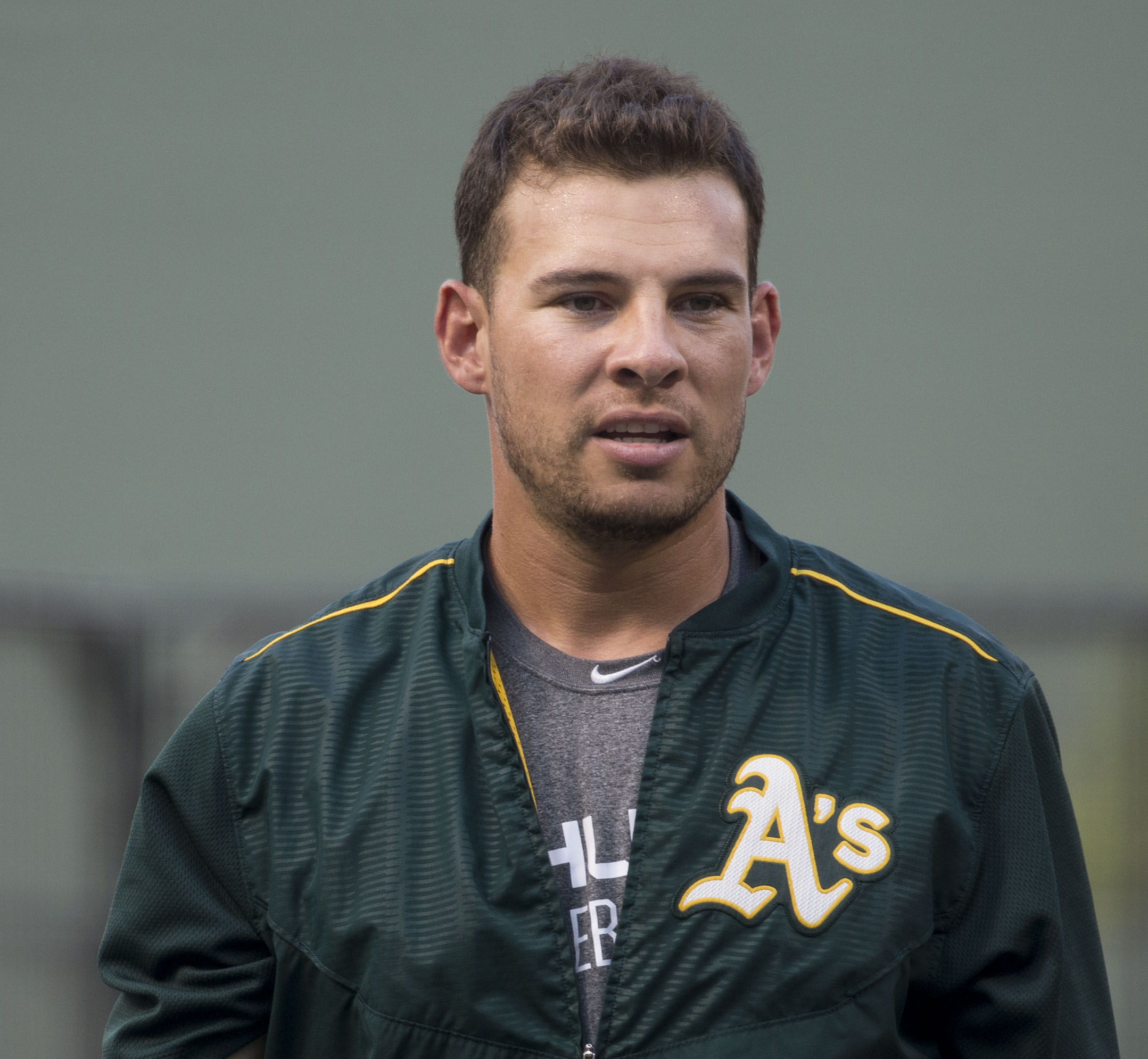
Valencia with the Oakland Athletics, 2015

The Oakland Athletics claimed Valencia off waivers on August 3, 2015. He debuted with the team on August 5, starting at third base. In 2015, he batted .284/.356/.530 for the Athletics, and batted .290/.345/.519 with 18 home runs in 345 at bats between the A's and Blue Jays. His .980 fielding percentage at third base was the highest among Major League third basemen with 50 or more games.

In August 2016, Valencia was involved in a clubhouse fight with Billy Butler. Both players were fined, but neither was suspended, and Butler was released the following month.

In 2016, Valencia batted .287 (.318 against left-handers)/.346/.446 with 72 runs (a career high), 22 doubles, 17 home runs (third on the team), and 51 RBIs in 517 plate appearances. He played first base, third base, right field, and left field. He earned $3.15 million.

=== Seattle Mariners (2017) ===
On November 12, 2016, Valencia was traded to the Seattle Mariners in exchange for pitcher Paul Blackburn. General manager Jerry Dipoto brought in Valencia as a way to give added flexibility to the roster, in particular to relieve first baseman Dan Vogelbach or third baseman Kyle Seager.

In June 2017, he had hits in nine consecutive at bats, tying the Mariners record set by Raúl Ibañez in 2004. Later that month the Mariners avoided arbitration and signed him for $5.5 million.

In 2017, Valencia batted .256 (.340 with runners in scoring position) with 3 triples (a career high), 15 home runs, 8 sacrifice flies (4th in the AL), and 66 RBIs in 450 at bats, as he played primarily first base while also playing 10 games in the outfield and one at third base.

Valencia became a free agent on November 2, 2017.

=== Second stint with Baltimore Orioles (2018) ===
On March 2, 2018, Valencia signed a major league contract with the Baltimore Orioles. The contract called for a $1.2 million base salary, and up to $3 million in incentives. NBC Sports opined that Valencia could platoon in right field with Colby Rasmus (while others conjectured that he might platoon with first baseman Chris Davis or back up third baseman Tim Beckham), and back up a number of other positions. He earned a spot on the Orioles' Opening Day roster, by mid-summer was Baltimore's everyday starting third baseman, and batted .325 after the All Star break. On August 2, Valencia became the 8th position player in Baltimore history to pitch, coming in with the Texas Rangers up 17-8, striking out Joey Gallo, the only batter he faced.

Valencia was designated for assignment on August 10, 2018, and released five days later. In 2018 he batted .263/.316/.408 (.303/.368/.505 against left-handers), with 9 home runs in 255 at bats.

Over the course of his career through 2018, he batted .312/.370/.494 against left-handed pitchers, with 37 home runs and 165 RBIs in 1,004 at bats. During his career through 2018, Valencia had played 507 games at third base, 163 games at first base, 71 games in right field, 33 games in left field, 9 games at second base, and 1 game as a pitcher.

=== Long Island Ducks ===
On July 2, 2021, Valencia signed with the Long Island Ducks of the Atlantic League of Professional Baseball in order to prepare for the Olympics. In 6 games he struggled mightily going 3-18 (.167) with 0 home runs and 2 RBIs.

== Team Israel; World Baseball Classic and Olympics ==
In September 2019, Valencia obtained Israeli citizenship and joined Team Israel for the 2019 European Baseball Championship in Germany from September 7–15, 2019.

He also played for the team at the Africa/Europe 2020 Olympic Qualification tournament in Italy in September 2019, which Israel won to qualify to play baseball at the 2020 Summer Olympics in Tokyo. Valencia led all players in the tournament in runs (7), home runs (3), RBIs (9), walks (5), and slugging percentage (1.000), while batting .375 with a .500 on base percentage in 16 at bats, and playing first base and DH. As to his joining Team Israel, Valencia said: "I can’t lie. My mother was heavily behind this."

On June 21, 2021, in preparation for the games (which were postponed to 2021 due to the COVID-19 pandemic), Valencia signed a contract with the Long Island Ducks of the Atlantic League of Professional Baseball. He played with the club from July 2 to July 8, after which he joined Team Israel on a barnstorming tour in the Northeastern United States to further prepare for Tokyo.

He played first base for Team Israel at the 2020 Summer Olympics in Tokyo in the summer of 2021, tied for the lead at the Olympics with three home runs, and batted .278 with a .778 slugging percentage (4th in the Olympics) in 18 at bats, with six runs (2nd) and seven RBIs (tied for 2nd).

Commenting on his experience playing for Team Israel, Valencia said: "I loved it.... On Friday nights, we had Shabbat dinner with prayers, toasts, and breaking bread with the boys. [And during the pre-game playing of Hatikvah, Israel’s national anthem] we kept our hats on for our national anthem—to show that God is above. We took our hats off for the national anthems of the other countries."

Valencia played for Team Israel in the 2023 World Baseball Classic, in Miami in March. He played for Team Israel manager Ian Kinsler, and alongside two-time All Star outfielder Joc Pederson, starting pitcher Dean Kremer, and others.

== Awards ==
High School

- 3x First team All-Palm Beach County
- 2x Second team All-State
- 2002 South Florida Sun-Sentinel All-County

College

- 2004 Southern Conference Freshman of the Year
- 2004 Second team All-Conference
- 2005 All-Regional Team

Minors

- 2006 Appalachian League All-Star
- 2007 Midwest League All Star
- 2007 Florida State League Player of the Week (July 16)
- 2008 Florida State League All Star
- 2009 Eastern League Player of the Week (May 24)

Majors

- 2010 Baseball America All-Rookie Team (3B)
- 2010 Topps Rookie All-Star Team (3B)
- 2010 Twins' Most Outstanding Rookie (the Bill Boni Award)

== See also ==
- List of Jewish Major League Baseball players

Preceded by Gordon Beckham	Topps Rookie All-Star Third Baseman; 2010	Succeeded by Brett Lawrie
