= Marcelo Mayer =

American baseball player (born 2002)

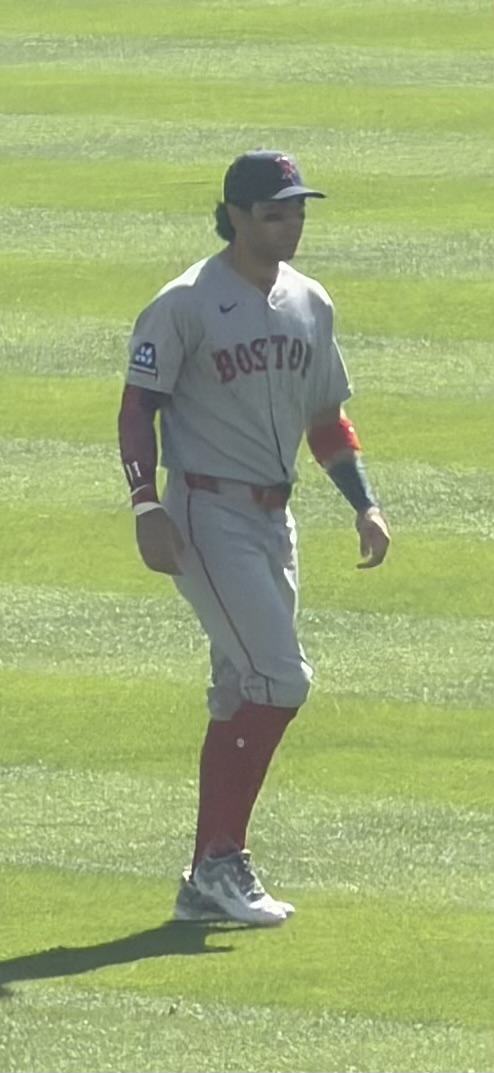
- Mayer with the Red Sox in 2026

San Francisco Giants – No. 7
- Infielder
- Born: December 12, 2002 (age 23); Chula Vista, California, U.S.
- Bats: Left Throws: Right

MLB debut
- May 24, 2025, for the Boston Red Sox

MLB statistics (through 2026 season)
- Batting average: .216
- Home runs: 7
- Runs batted in: 32
- Stats at Baseball Reference

Teams
- Boston Red Sox (2025–2026); San Francisco Giants (2026–present)

Marcelo Mayer (/ˈmaɪ.ər/ MY-ər; born December 12, 2002) is an American professional baseball infielder for the San Francisco Giants of Major League Baseball (MLB). He was selected by the Boston Red Sox in the first round, fourth overall, of the 2021 MLB draft, and made his MLB debut with them in 2025.

== Early life ==
Mayer attended Eastlake High School in Chula Vista, California. He became Eastlake's varsity starting shortstop as a freshman in 2018. He committed to play college baseball at the University of Southern California after his freshman year. As a sophomore in 2019, he batted .261 alongside pitching to a 2.00 earned run average (ERA) over five appearances. In 2020, his junior season, he hit .294 with three home runs, six runs batted in (RBIs), and two doubles before the season was canceled due to the COVID-19 pandemic. That summer, he played in the Perfect Game All-American Classic.

As a senior in 2021, Mayer batted .392 with 14 home runs and 45 RBIs. In his final high school at bat, he hit a grand slam. He was named the Collegiate Baseball National High School Player of the Year. He was also named Mr. Baseball California State Player of the Year for the 2021 season by Cal-Hi Sports.

== Professional career ==
=== Draft and minor leagues ===
The Boston Red Sox selected Mayer in the first round, with the fourth overall selection, of the 2021 Major League Baseball draft. It was the Red Sox's highest draft pick in over 50 years. Several analysts had Mayer ranked as the top overall prospect in the draft and had described him as a five-tool player. The pick gave the Red Sox a signing bonus allotment of $6,664,000. Mayer officially signed with Boston on July 22, for the assigned slot price of $6.66 million. Mayer reported to the club's spring training base at Fort Myers, Florida, soon after signing. He made his professional debut for the Florida Complex League Red Sox on August 5, drawing three walks. His first two professional home runs came in back-to-back games in the second half of August. Mayer finished his first professional season with 91 at-bats in which he hit .275 with three home runs and 17 RBIs.

Mayer was assigned to the Salem Red Sox to open the 2022 season. In May 2022, he was ranked 14th in the list of baseball's top 100 prospects by Baseball America. In early August, he was promoted to the Greenville Drive. Over 91 games between both teams, he slashed .280/.399/.489 with 13 home runs, 53 RBIs, and 30 doubles along with going 17-for-17 in stolen base attempts. In January 2023, he was ranked 10th in the Baseball America list of top 100 prospects. He was named the South Atlantic League Player of the Week for the first week of May, going 16-for-31 with three home runs, six doubles and 12 RBIs in one series. After batting .290/.366/.890 in 35 games at Greenville in 2023, Mayer was promoted to the Double-A Portland Sea Dogs in late May. He was the youngest Boston prospect promoted to Double-A since 2009.

Mayer began the 2024 season with Portland, ranked as the Red Sox' top minor-league prospect by Baseball America. In August, he was promoted to the Triple-A Worcester Red Sox, along with fellow-prospects Roman Anthony and Kyle Teel. At the time of his promotion, Mayer had posted a .307/.370/.480 slash line with Portland.

=== Boston Red Sox (2025–2026) ===
Mayer was promoted to the major leagues on May 24, 2025, for a game against the Baltimore Orioles at Fenway Park. Due to an injury to Alex Bregman, Mayer started at third base in his MLB debut game. The following day, Mayer notched his first major-league hit, a single in the second inning, and his first extra-base hit, a double in the ninth inning. On June 6, Mayer hit his first career home run off New York Yankees pitcher Will Warren in the top of the fifth inning. It marked the first time that a Red Sox player recorded his first career home run at Yankee Stadium since September 7, 2013, when Xander Bogaerts hit his first career home run, also at Yankee Stadium. On June 11, Mayer hit two home runs against the Tampa Bay Rays, becoming the youngest Red Sox player to have a multi-homer game since Rafael Devers in 2018. He also became the third-youngest player in Red Sox history to have a multi-homer game within his first five career games, behind only Billy Conigliaro (21) and Ted Williams (20). In 44 appearances for Boston during his rookie campaign, Mayer batted .228/.272/.402 with four home runs and 10 RBI. On July 25, he was placed on the injured list due to a right wrist sprain. On August 17, manager Alex Cora announced that Mayer would require season-ending wrist surgery.

In 2026, Mayer was named to his first Opening Day roster as a second baseman. On June 26, he was placed on the injured list with a bone stress reaction to the left ulna. Mayer played in 70 games for Boston and batted .220 with three home runs and 22 RBI.

=== San Francisco Giants ===
On August 3, 2026, the Red Sox traded Mayer to the San Francisco Giants in exchange for Erik Miller and Carlos Gutierrez. He was activated from the injured list and made his Giants debut on September 21 at Oracle Park. Mayer played in six games for the Giants and recorded one hit across 15 at–bats.

== Personal life ==
Mayer became the third player from Eastlake High School to be selected in the first round of an MLB draft, joining Adrian Gonzalez (2000) and Keoni Cavaco (2019). Mayer grew up a fan of the New York Yankees. He has listed Corey Seager, Francisco Lindor, and Fernando Tatís Jr. as players he admires. Mayer has also listed Derek Jeter as an inspiration for the way he carried himself on and off the field as well as his love for winning.

Mayer was raised in Chula Vista, and also has roots in Ambos Nogales where Mayer's family members have played baseball on both sides of the border. His parents, Enrique and Myriam Mayer, were both born in Nogales Municipality, Sonora, Mexico, and Mayer is also related to Hector "Chero" Mayer who played in the minor leagues with the St. Louis Cardinals organization in the 1950s.
