= Tom Nieto =

American baseball player (1960–2026)

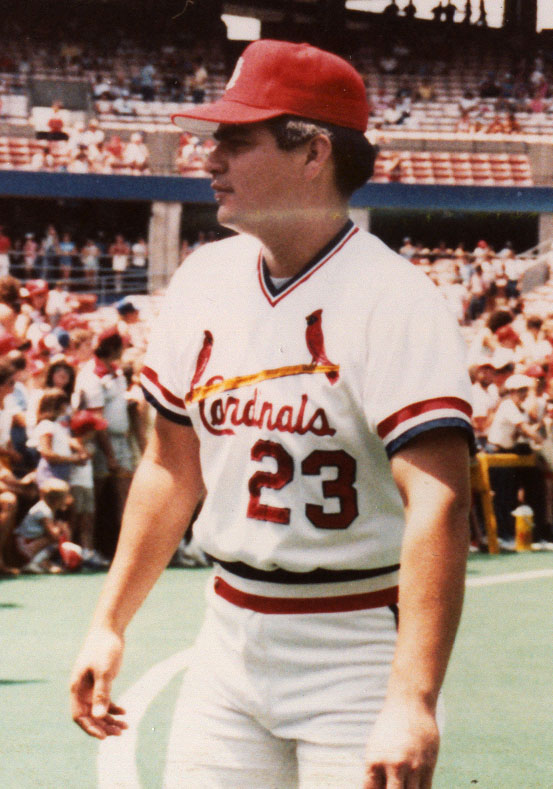
- Catcher
- Born: October 27, 1960; Downey, California, U.S.
- Died: March 27, 2026 (aged 65); Zephyrhills, Florida, U.S.
- Batted: Right Threw: Right

MLB debut
- May 10, 1984, for the St. Louis Cardinals

Last MLB appearance
- September 29, 1990, for the Philadelphia Phillies

MLB statistics
- Batting average: .205
- Home runs: 5
- Runs batted in: 69
- Stats at Baseball Reference

Teams
- As player: St. Louis Cardinals (1984–1985); Montreal Expos (1986); Minnesota Twins (1987–1988); Philadelphia Phillies (1989–1990); As coach: New York Yankees (1995–2002); New York Mets (2005–2008)

Thomas Andrew Nieto (October 27, 1960 – March 27, 2026) was an American professional baseball catcher who played in Major League Baseball (MLB) for the St. Louis Cardinals, Montreal Expos, Minnesota Twins, and Philadelphia Phillies. Nieto was past manager of the manager of the Minor League Baseball (MiLB) Rochester Red Wings, the Twins’ Triple-A affiliate. He previously served in various coaching capacities for the New York Yankees and New York Mets. A native of Artesia, California, Nieto attended Gahr High School then went on to Cerritos College and Oral Roberts University.

== Playing career ==
The St. Louis Cardinals drafted Nieto in the third round of the 1981 amateur draft. He played for the Cardinals in 1984 and 1985, the Montreal Expos in 1986, the Twins in 1987 and 1988, and the Philadelphia Phillies in 1989 and 1990. He played in the World Series with the Cardinals in 1985. Nieto won a World Series ring with the Twins in 1987.

== Coaching career ==
From 1995 to 2002, Nieto worked with the New York Yankees, serving as the major league catching coach in 2000 and 2001. He managed the Palm Beach Cardinals of the Florida State League in 2003 and 2004. When Willie Randolph was named manager of the New York Mets following the 2004 season, he named Nieto as his catching instructor on November 26, 2004. In 2007, Nieto switched from catching instructor to first base coach. On June 17, 2008, the Mets fired Nieto, manager Willie Randolph, and pitching coach Rick Peterson.

Nieto joined the Minnesota Twins organization in 2009 as the manager of the Double-A New Britain Rock Cats. In his first and only season in New Britain, he led the Rock Cats to a 72–69 record and a playoff berth. On October 20, 2009, Nieto was named as the new manager of the Rochester Red Wings, Minnesota's Triple-A affiliate. He replaced Stan Cliburn, whose contract was not renewed by the Twins following the 2009 season. On October 29, 2010, the Twins announced Nieto and his coaching staff would return to manage the Red Wings for the 2011 season. Following the 2011 season, Nieto was let go by the Twins organization. Nieto managed the GCL Yankees for the 2012 and 2013 seasons.

== Death ==
Nieto died from a heart attack in Zephyrhills, Florida, on March 27, 2026, at the age of 65.

Sporting positions
Preceded by Jimmy Johnson	Greensboro Bats Manager; 1997–1998	Succeeded by Stan Hough
Preceded by Lee Mazzilli	Tampa Yankees Manager; 1999	Succeeded by Brian Butterfield
Preceded by Bobby Cuellar	New Britain Rock Cats Manager; 2009	Succeeded by Jeff Smith
Preceded by Stan Cliburn	Rochester Red Wings Manager; 2010–2011	Succeeded by Gene Glynn
