= Stew Cliburn =

American baseball player and coach (born 1956)

Stu Cliburn

Chicago Dogs – No. 31
- Pitcher / Coach
- Born: December 19, 1956 (age 69); Jackson, Mississippi, U.S.
- Batted: Right Threw: Right

MLB debut
- September 17, 1984, for the California Angels

Last MLB appearance
- October 1, 1988, for the California Angels

MLB statistics
- Win–loss record: 13–5
- Earned run average: 3.11
- Strikeouts: 91
- Stats at Baseball Reference

Teams
- California Angels (1984–1985, 1988)

Stewart Walker Cliburn (born December 19, 1956) is an American professional baseball coach and former pitcher who is currently the pitching coach for the Chicago Dogs of the American Association of Professional Baseball. He played in Major League Baseball (MLB) for the California Angels in all or parts of three seasons spanning 1984–1988.

== Career ==
The Pittsburgh Pirates selected Cliburn in the fourth round of the 1977 MLB draft out of Delta State University. He spent five seasons in their Minor League system as a starting pitcher, before being released at the end of spring training in 1982. He signed with the Angels three weeks later, and by 1984 he had converted into a reliever. He made his major league debut as a September call-up that year, appearing in one game against the Kansas City Royals, pitching two innings and giving up three runs.

The 1985 season was Cliburn's best, as he had a 9–3 record and a 2.09 ERA along with six saves. However, he suffered from arm problems in 1986 and wound up back in the minor leagues. He then was released by the Angels after the 1987 season, but was re-signed a month later.

The year 1988 saw Cliburn return to the Angels, in what would prove to be his only full season at the major league level. Working as a long reliever, he had a 4–2 record and a 4.07 ERA. He returned to the minor leagues in 1989, pitching two more seasons for the Angels and Texas Rangers organizations. After that, he had a brief stint with the Daytona Beach Explorers of the Senior Professional Baseball Association in 1990, where he formed a battery with his brother Stan.

Cliburn has been a minor league pitching coach since 1991, spending two seasons in the Angels' organization before joining the Minnesota Twins in 1993, spending that season with the Elizabethton Twins of the Appalachian League. He has coached at every minor league level for the Twins, reaching their Triple-A affiliate Rochester Red Wings in 2006–08. Stew returned to their double-A affiliate New Britain Rock Cats in 2009 to aid the development of younger pitchers. As of the 2016 season, Stew returned with the Red Wings as their pitching coach. His brother was also a coach in the Twins' organization. He was hired as the pitching coach of the Chicago Dogs for the 2021 season.

== Personal life ==
He is the twin brother of catcher Stan Cliburn, who also played in the majors.
