= Trevor Lane =

American baseball player (born 1994)

- Pitcher
- Born: April 26, 1994 (age 31); North Bend, Washington, U.S.
- Bats: Left Throws: Left

Trevor Lane (born April 26, 1994) is an American former professional baseball pitcher. He was drafted by the New York Yankees in the 10th round of the 2016 MLB draft, but never played in Major League Baseball after playing parts of six seasons in the Yankees organization.

== Career ==
Lane attended Mount Si High School in Snoqualmie, Washington. He played for the school's baseball team as a pitcher and first baseman, and was named the Gatorade Washington Player of the Year in 2012. He enrolled at Lower Columbia College, where he played college baseball for two years, and transferred to the University of Illinois at Chicago (UIC) to play for the UIC Flames. Lane was named the top relief pitcher in the Horizon League in 2017.

=== New York Yankees ===
The New York Yankees selected Lane in the 10th round of the 2016 MLB draft. He signed and pitched for the Rookie-level GCL Yankees before being promoted to the Staten Island Yankees of the Low–A New York-Penn League. In 15 1/3 relief innings pitched between both teams, he went 1–0 with a 0.59 ERA. In 2017, he began the year with the Charleston RiverDogs of the Single–A South Atlantic League. He also spent time with the Tampa Tarpons of the High–A Florida State League during the year. In 37 relief appearances, he went 6–4 with a 1.52 ERA.

The Yankees invited Lane to spring training in 2018 as a non-roster player. He began the year with Tampa and was promoted in May to the Trenton Thunder of the Double–A Eastern League. Over 68 relief innings pitched between the two teams, Lane compiled a 2–4 record with a 3.97 ERA, striking out 82 batters. He returned to Trenton to begin the 2019 season, and he also spent time during the year with the Tarpons and the Scranton/Wilkes-Barre RailRiders of the Triple–A International League. Over 74 2/3 relief innings between the three clubs, Lane went 6–2 with a 2.05 ERA, striking out 74 batters. He did not play in a game in 2020 due to the cancellation of the minor league season because of the COVID-19 pandemic.

In May 2021, Lane was named to the roster of the United States national baseball team for the Americas Qualifying Event.

Lane spent the 2021 season with Triple-A Scranton, posting a 4-0 record and 1.99 ERA with 28 strikeouts in 22 2/3 innings pitched. Lane was assigned to the Scranton to begin the 2022 season. After working to a 2.08 ERA with 25 strikeouts in 21 2/3 innings of work, he was released by the Yankees organization on July 5, 2022.

=== Chicago Dogs ===
On July 20, 2022, Lane signed with the Chicago Dogs of the American Association of Professional Baseball. In 18 games for the club, he recorded a 5.63 ERA with 19 strikeouts across 16 innings pitched.

On March 30, 2023, Lane re-signed with the Dogs for the 2023 season. He made 23 appearances (18 starts) for the Dogs, compiling a 6–7 record and 5.17 ERA with 96 strikeouts across 102 2/3 innings. Lane would become a free agent after the 2023 season.
