= Eastlake High School (California) =

Public high school in Chula Vista, California, United States

Coordinates: 32°38′26″N 116°58′4″W

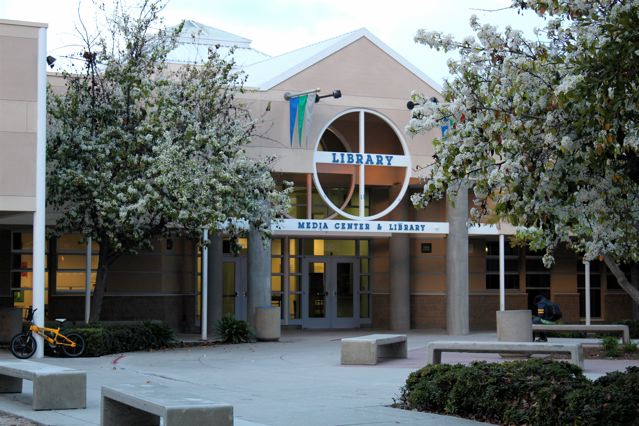

Location
- 1120 Eastlake Parkway; Chula Vista, California

Information
- Type: Public high school
- Motto: "Where today's learning shapes tomorrow's success."
- Established: 1992
- School district: Sweetwater Union High School District
- Superintendent: Moisés G. Aguirre
- Principal: Dianne Huslin
- Teaching staff: 109.74
- Grades: 9-12
- Enrollment: 2,710 (2023-2024)
- Student to teacher ratio: 24.69
- Schedule: Year - Round, Common Education Calendar
- Campus: Suburban
- Colors: Royal blue, kelly green, and gray.
- Athletics conference: Metropolitan - Mesa League
- Mascot: Titans
- Newspaper: Eastlake Edge
- Yearbook: The Raven
- Website: Official site

Eastlake High School (ELH or EHS) is a public secondary school in Chula Vista, California. It opened on September 8, 1992. The school is located just east of California State Route 125 in the neighborhood of Eastlake, a suburb located southeast of downtown San Diego.

The Ruth Chapman Performing Arts Center, located on campus, is used for band (Titan Regiment) and orchestra concerts, dance performances, plays, church services, and other community events. The school features an amphitheater, an observatory, and an engineering department.

== Academic performance ==
The school received an Academic Performance Index score of 854 for the 2012 school year, which was the highest score by a high school in the Sweetwater Union High School District.

== 2024 Graduation Ceremony Incident ==
Minutes before the 2024 graduation ceremony at Eastlake High School a senior, Sophia Benzon, was instructed by staff to either remove her leis, which represented her Hawaiian culture, or not participate in the ceremony despite having been previously given permission by the principal. The student chose not to participate in the ceremony. The school district later investigated the incident and agreed that the student should have been allowed to wear the leis as "traditional tribal regalia or recognized objects of cultural or religious significance".

== Sports & Activities ==
Fall sports: - American football - Girls' volleyball - Cheerleading - Girls' golf- Metro League champs - Cross country - Boys' water polo - Field hockey

Winter sports - Boys' basketball - Girls' basketball - Boys' soccer - Girls' soccer - Wrestling / girls & boys - Girls' water polo - Roller hockey - Indoor percussion ensemble

Spring sports: - Baseball - Softball - Track and field - Boys & Girls volleyball - Boys' tennis - Boys' golf -Girls' gymnastics - Swim & dive - Lacrosse

Other activities/teams: - Band (Titan Regiment) - Dance - VEX Robotics (2736A and 2736Z) - FIRST Robotics (TitanBot 2543)

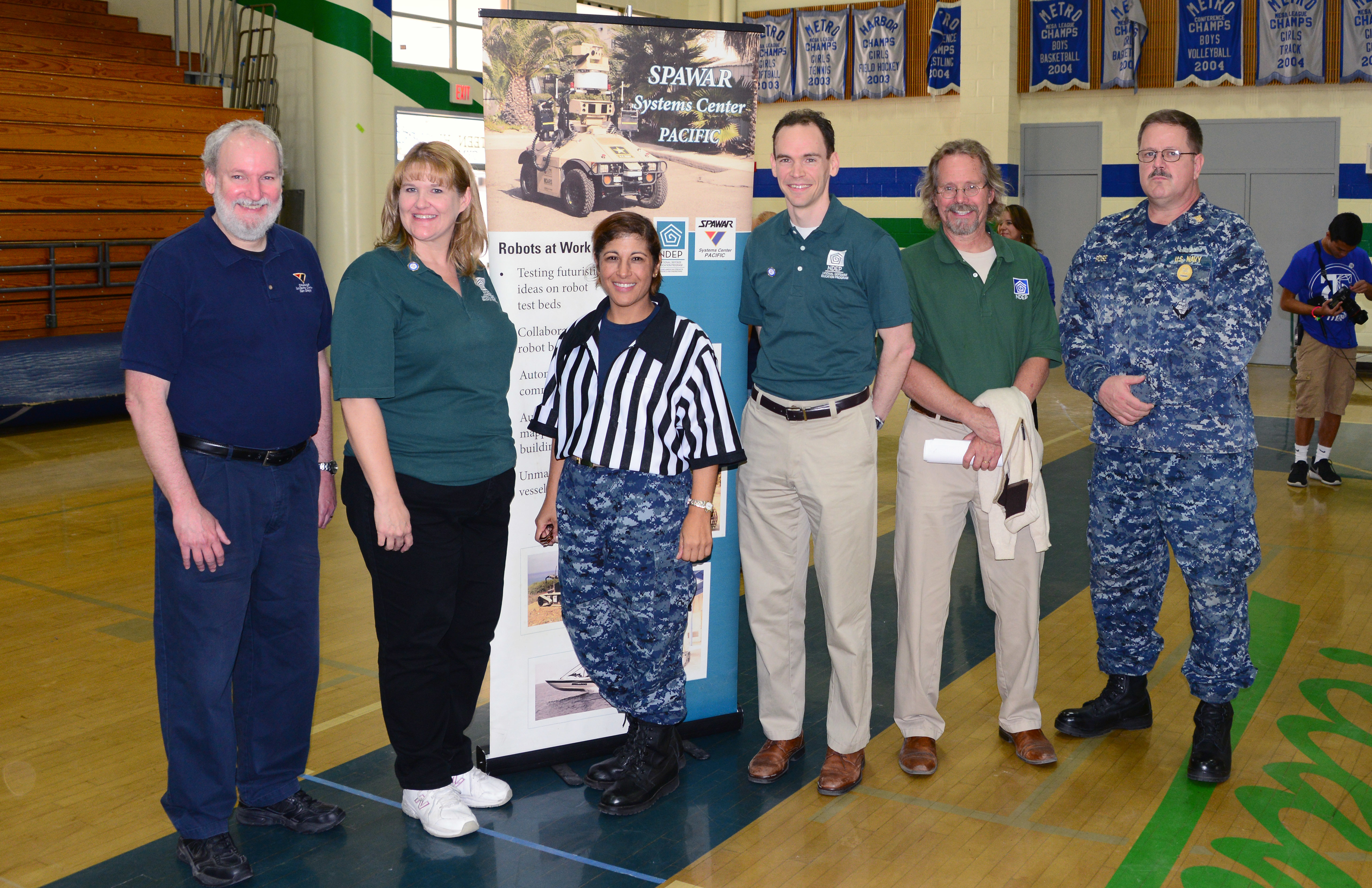
SPAWAR personnel volunteer at the FIRST LEGO League Qualifying Tournament held at Eastlake High School in Chula Vista, California, on November 16, 2014. The Naval Information Warfare Systems Command co-hosted the event

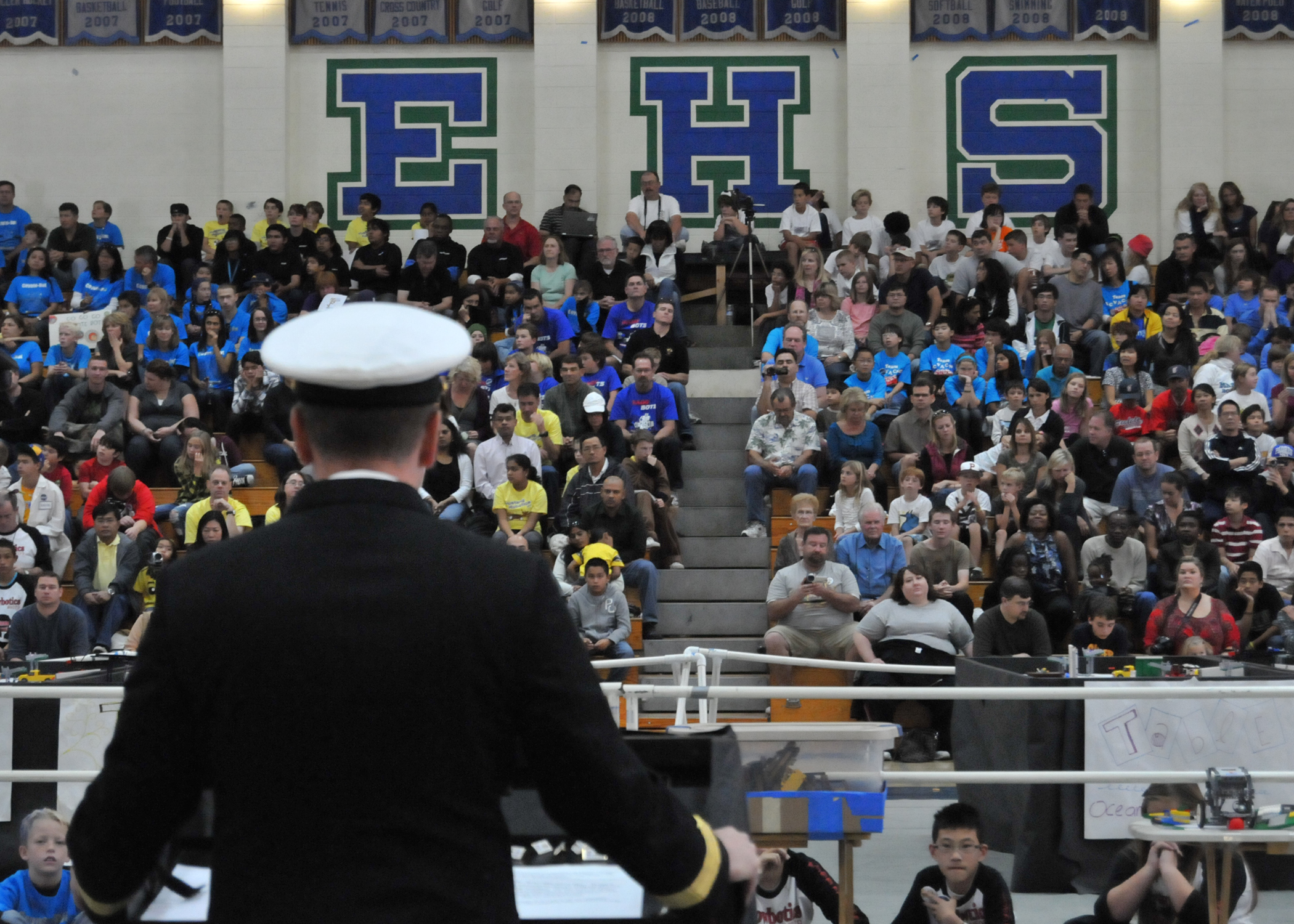
U.S. Navy Deputy Commander of the (SPAWAR), delivers opening remarks at the tournament, where 24 teams competed for advancement to the Southern California championships.

== Notable alumni ==
Name	Grad Class	Category	Best Known For
Adrián González	(2000)	Baseball	Major League Baseball first baseman
Tony Jefferson	(2010)	Football	NFL defensive back
Casey Schmitt	(2017)	Baseball	Infielder for the San Francisco Giants
William Dunkle	(2018)	Football	Offensive guard for the Pittsburgh Steelers
Chris Olave	(2018)	Football	Wide receiver for New Orleans Saints (2023–present)
Keoni Cavaco	(2019)	Baseball	Minnesota Twins first round draft pick
Marcelo Mayer	(2021)	Baseball	First-round selection in the 2021 MLB draft
Trey White	(2022)	Football	College football defensive end for the San Diego State Aztecs
Krysada Panusith Phounsiri	(2006)	Artist	American poet
Grant Holman	(2018)	Baseball	Baseball player
Katya Echazarreta	(2013)	Space	First Mexican woman to fly in space
Valentino Arteaga	Unknown	Music	Drummer for Lower Definition and Of Mice & Men
Eddy Marshburn	Unknown	Music	Lead guitarist of the band Lower Definition
Stefan Toler	Unknown	Music	Bass guitarist of the band Lower Definition

== Media ==
The movie Bring It On was partially filmed at the school's football stadium.
