= TJ Hopkins =

American baseball player (born 1997)

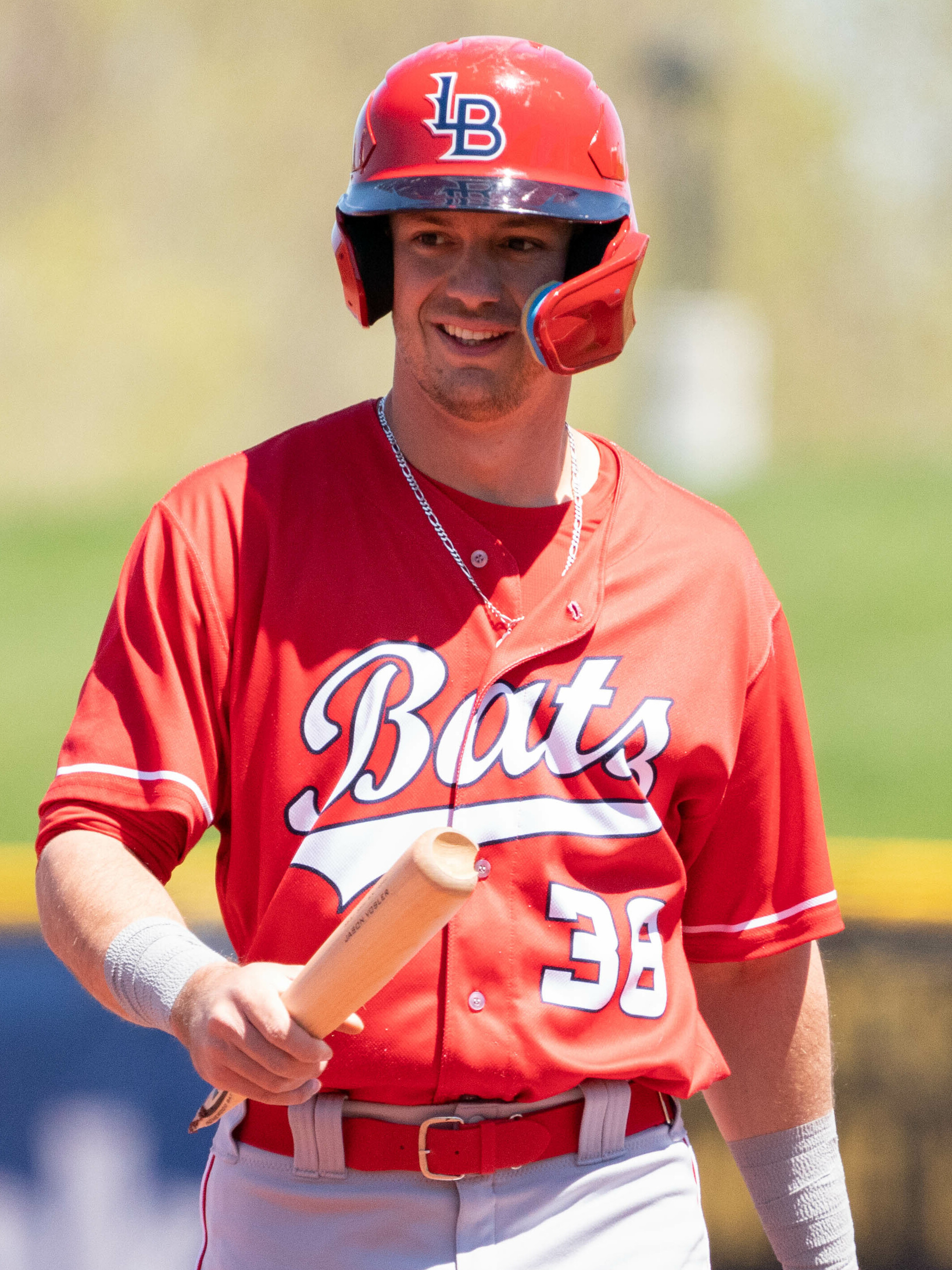
- Hopkins with the Louisville Bats in 2023

Free agent
- Outfielder
- Born: January 16, 1997 (age 29); Summerville, South Carolina, U.S.
- Bats: Right Throws: Right

MLB debut
- June 3, 2023, for the Cincinnati Reds

MLB statistics (through 2023 season)
- Batting average: .171
- Home runs: 0
- Runs batted in: 1
- Stats at Baseball Reference

Teams
- Cincinnati Reds (2023)

Mark Timothy Hopkins (born December 4, 1997) is an American professional baseball outfielder who is a free agent. He has previously played in Major League Baseball (MLB) for the Cincinnati Reds.

== Career ==
=== Amateur career ===
Hopkins attended Summerville High School in Summerville, South Carolina, and the University of South Carolina, where he played college baseball for the South Carolina Gamecocks.

=== Cincinnati Reds ===
The Cincinnati Reds selected Hopkins in the ninth round of the 2019 Major League Baseball draft. He made his professional debut that year with the Billings Mustangs. Hopkins did not play in a game in 2020 due to the cancellation of the minor league season because of the COVID-19 pandemic. He returned in 2021 to play for the Chattanooga Lookouts. He played 2022 with Chattanooga and the Louisville Bats and started the 2023 season with Louisville. In 50 games for Louisville, Hopkins batted .341/.437/.540 with seven home runs and 27 runs batted in.

On June 3, 2023, Hopkins was selected to the 40-man roster and promoted to the major leagues for the first time. In 25 games for the Reds during his debut campaign, he batted .171/.227/.171 with one RBI and one stolen base. On December 14, Hopkins was designated for assignment following the signing of Austin Wynns.

=== Detroit Tigers ===
On December 19, 2023, the Reds traded Hopkins to the San Francisco Giants in exchange for cash or a player to be named later. He was designated for assignment by the Giants on February 13, 2024, following the acquisition of Otto Lopez and claimed off waivers by the Detroit Tigers on February 20. He was designated for assignment by the Tigers on February 22, cleared waivers and was outrighted to the Triple–A Toledo Mud Hens on February 25. Hopkins began the year with the Double–A Erie SeaWolves, hitting .190/.326/.329 with two home runs, four RBI, and two stolen bases across 22 games. On May 24, it was announced that Hopkins would miss the remainder of the season after undergoing surgery to repair a labrum tear in his right shoulder.

Hopkins was released by the Tigers organization on March 28, 2025.

=== Chicago Dogs ===
On May 18, 2025, Hopkins signed with the Chicago Dogs of the American Association of Professional Baseball. In 72 games he hit .276/.378/.498 with 11 home runs, 48 RBIs and 3 stolen bases. He became a free agent following the season.

== Personal life ==
His brother, Brody, is also a baseball player.
