= William Dunkle =

American football player (born 1999)

Profile
- Position: Offensive guard

Personal information
- Born: December 30, 1999 (age 26); San Ysidro, California, U.S.
- Listed height: 6 ft 5 in (1.96 m)
- Listed weight: 330 lb (150 kg)

Career information
- High school: Eastlake (CA)
- College: San Diego State
- NFL draft: 2022: undrafted

Career history
- Philadelphia Eagles (2022)*; Pittsburgh Steelers (2022–2023)*
- * Offseason or practice squad member only

Awards and highlights
- All-American (2021); First-team All-Mountain West (2021)
- Stats at Pro Football Reference

William Anthony Dunkle (born December 30, 1999) is an American professional football offensive guard. He played college football at San Diego State and was signed by the Philadelphia Eagles as an undrafted free agent in 2022.

== Early life and college ==
Dunkle was born on December 30, 1999, in San Ysidro, California, and grew up in Chula Vista. He attended Eastlake High School and was a three-time all-conference selection. 247Sports listed him as a three-star prospect.

Dunkle committed to San Diego State University in 2018, spending his first year as a redshirt. As a freshman in 2019, he played in all 13 games and started 12, making the Mountain West Conference team of the week three times and being named honorable mention all-conference at the end of the season. At the beginning of his sophomore season, Dunkle was selected preseason first-team All-Mountain West by College Football News. He started four games at right guard and appeared in five total, being named the team's best offensive player by College Football News.

As a junior in 2021, Dunkle started 14 games and played on 920 of San Diego State's 967 offensive snaps. Pro Football Focus listed him as having the second-highest overall grade and the number one run block grade in the nation. On 429 pass plays, he allowed only 10 quarterback pressures and allowed no sacks. At the end of the season, he was named first-team All-American by Pro Football Network, second-team by Associated Press and College Football Focus, and third-team by Pro Football Focus. He was also named first-team all-conference by the Mountain West coaches and media.

== Professional career ==
Pre-draft measurables
Height	Weight	Arm length	Hand span	Wingspan	40-yard dash	10-yard split	20-yard split	20-yard shuttle	Three-cone drill	Vertical jump	Broad jump	Bench press
6 ft 4 7/8 in (1.95 m)	328 lb (149 kg)	33 5/8 in (0.85 m)	10 1/4 in (0.26 m)	6 ft 8 3/4 in (2.05 m)	5.44 s	1.85 s	3.12 s	4.91 s	7.97 s	26.0 in (0.66 m)	7 ft 11 in (2.41 m)	25 reps
All values from NFL Combine

=== Philadelphia Eagles ===
After going unselected in the draft, he was signed by the Philadelphia Eagles as an undrafted free agent. He was released on August 14, 2022.

=== Pittsburgh Steelers ===
The Pittsburgh Steelers signed Dunkle on August 16, 2022. He was waived on August 30 and signed to the practice squad the next day. He signed a reserve/future contract on January 10, 2023.

On August 28, 2023, Dunkle was waived by the Steelers.
