= Chicago Dogs =

American independent professional baseball team

- Founded in 2018; Rosemont, Illinois
Team logo
Cap insignia

Minor league affiliations
- Class: Independent (2018–present)
- League: American Association of Professional Baseball (2018–present)
- Division: East Division

Minor league titles
- League titles: none
- Division titles (3): 2021; 2022; 2023

Team data
- Colors: Light blue, red, white
- Ballpark: Impact Field
- Owner/ Operator: Shawn Hunter
- Manager: Stan Cliburn
- Media: AA Baseball TV
- Website: thechicagodogs.com

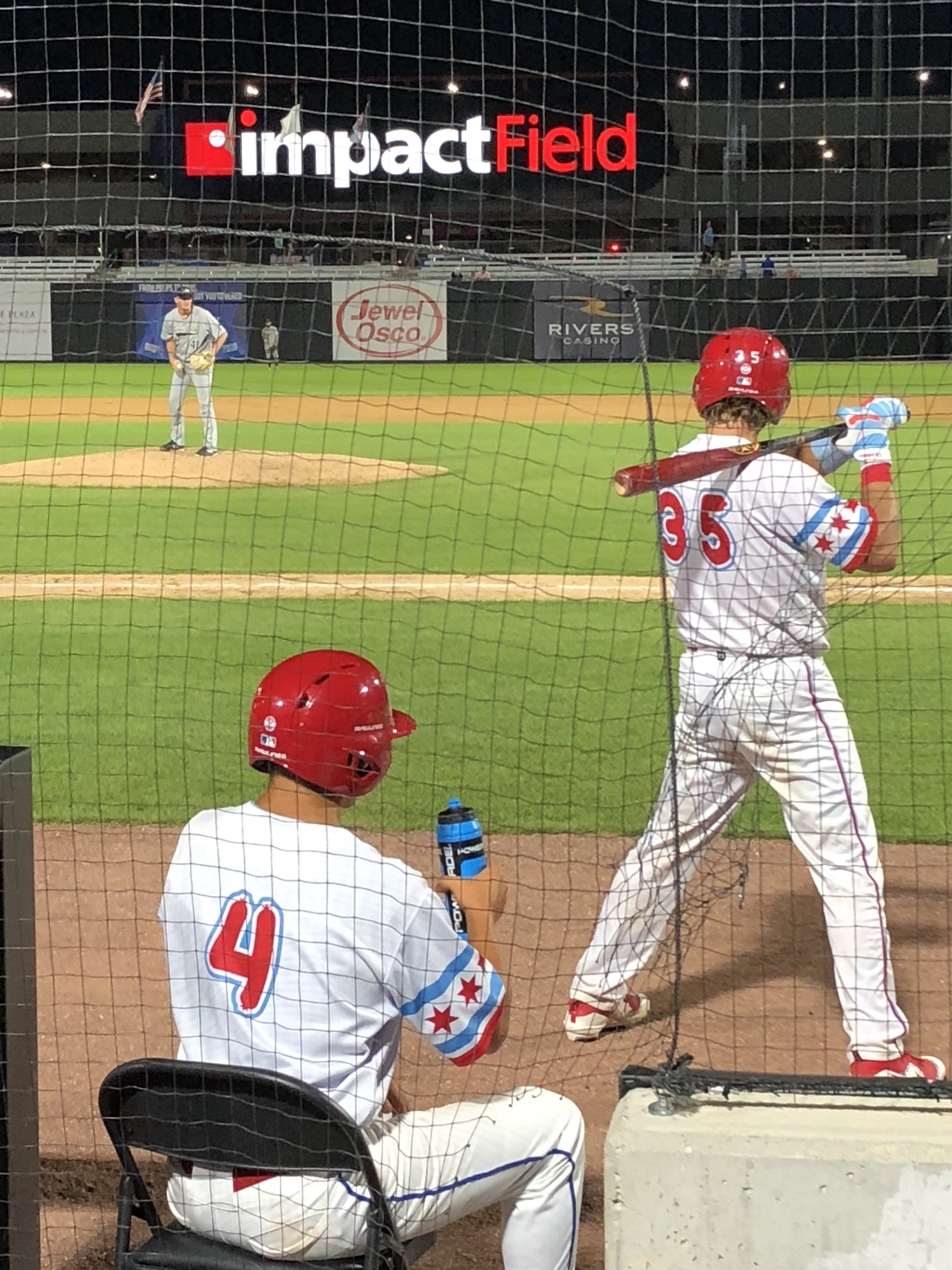
The Chicago Dogs playing against the Sioux City Explorers at Impact Field in 2018

The Chicago Dogs are an independent professional baseball team based in the Chicago metropolitan area. They are members of the American Association of Professional Baseball, an official Partner League of Major League Baseball. They began play in 2018 and play home games at the 6,300-seat Impact Field. The team's branding alludes to the Chicago-style hot dog, a local street food.

== History ==
=== 2018 ===
In 2018, their first year as a team, the Dogs' manager was Butch Hobson. Former Chicago White Sox minor league pitcher Josh Goossen-Brown was the first player signed by the Chicago Dogs. They finished the season in fourth place out of six teams in the American Association North Division with a record of 45–54.

=== 2019 ===
In 2019, Carlos Zambrano joined the Dogs' roster. Zambrano had pitched in the major leagues for 12 years, most of them as a member of the Chicago Cubs. Butch Hobson continued to serve as the team's manager. Keon Barnum hit 31 home runs, breaking a record held by C.J. Ziegler of Wichita in 2013. The Dogs finished the season in third place in the North Division with a record of 59–41.

=== 2020 ===
In 2020, the Dogs competed as one of six league teams in a condensed 60-game season as a result of the COVID-19 pandemic. They were originally slated to play home games at Franklin Field (home of the Milwaukee Milkmen) due to capacity restrictions for outdoor events in Illinois. However, these restrictions were lifted on June 26 (as the state officially moved into Phase 4 of their reopening plan, allowing for outdoor spectator sports to resume at limited capacity) and thus enabled the Dogs to play all their home games at Impact Field.

=== 2021 ===
The Dogs won the North Division with a 63–37 record, clinching their first regular-season division title and playoff berth. They were eliminated by the Fargo-Moorhead RedHawks in the North Division Championship Series.

=== 2022–2023 ===
In 2022, the Dogs finished 54–46 and tied for first in the East Division. The following year, they finished 56–44 and shared the division lead, then advanced to the Miles Wolff Cup Finals, where they lost to the Kansas City Monarchs.

=== 2025 ===
Under manager Matt Passerelle, the Dogs finished 50–49 and placed second in the East Division. They swept the Lake Country DockHounds in the Division Series to reach the East Division Championship Series, where the Kane County Cougars won the deciding fifth game, 10–3.

== Mascot ==
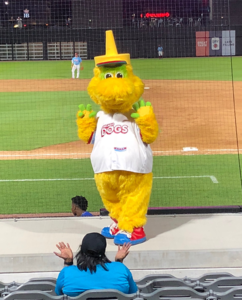
Squeeze, mascot of the Dogs, in 2019

The mascot of the Chicago Dogs is Squeeze, a fuzzy yellow creature who resembles a squeeze bottle of mustard.

== Season-by-season records ==
Season	League	Division	Record	Div. Finish	Ovr. Finish	Win%	Playoffs	Manager
2018	AA	North	45–54	4th	8th	.455	Did not qualify	Butch Hobson
2019	AA	North	59–41	3rd	3rd	.590	Did not qualify	Butch Hobson
2020	AA	N/A	26–32	6th	6th	.448	Did not qualify	Butch Hobson
2021	AA	North	63–37	1st	2nd	.630	Lost Division Championship; Fargo-Moorhead RedHawks; 3–2	Butch Hobson
2022	AA	East	54–46	1st	3rd	.540	Lost Division Series; Milwaukee Milkmen; 2–1	Butch Hobson
2023	AA	East	56–44	1st	2nd	.560	Won Division Series; Cleburne Railroaders; 2–1; Won Division Championship; Milwaukee Milkmen; 2–1; Lost Wolff Cup Finals; Kansas City Monarchs; 3–1	Butch Hobson
2024	AA	East	55–45	3rd	5th	.545	Won Division Series; Cleburne Railroaders; 2–1; Lost Division Championship; Kane County Cougars; 2–0	Jeff Isom
2025	AA	East	50–49	2nd	6th	.505	Won Division Series; Lake Country DockHounds; 2–0; Lost Division Championship; Kane County Cougars; 3–2	Matt Passerelle

- NOTE: Division realignment in 2022

== Roster ==
Chicago Dogs roster
Active (25-man) roster	Coaching staff
Pitchers: 35 John Baker; 12 Trey Braithwaite; 25 Keoni Cavaco; 99 Connor Curlis; 14 Zach Davidson; 36 Jacob DeLabio; 17 J.C. Keys; 37 Steven Lacey; 10 Eric Lin; 27 Dwayne Marshall; 16 Brady Miller; 29 Jack Nedrow; 33 Patrick Pridgen; 40 Anthony Ranaudo; 32 Bryce Schaum; 11 Michael Vallone; Catchers: 38 Tripp Clark; 22 Chance Sisco; 13 Jonathan Soto; Infielders: 20 Henry Kusiak; 19 Howard Rodriguez; 8 Dusty Stroup; 5 Jacob Teter; 4 Jaylyn Williams; Outfielders: -- Aaron Altherr; 34 TJ Hopkins; 28 Jacob Maiben; 6 Reggie Pruitt Jr.; 9 Johnni Turbo	Manager: -- Matt Passerelle; Coaches: 31 Stu Cliburn (pitching); -- Owen Reith (bench); -- Edgardo Lopez (clubhouse manager); Disabled list; ‡ Inactive list; § Suspended list; Roster updated August 23, 2025 Transactions

== Notable alumni ==
- Scott Barnes (2018)
- Joe Benson (2018)
- Chad Girodo (2018)
- Kenny Wilson (2018)
- Casey Crosby (2019–2020)
- Victor Roache (2019–2020)
- D. J. Snelten (2019, 2023)
- Luke Wilkins (2019)
- Carlos Zambrano (2019)
- Eddie Butler (2020)
- Jamie Callahan (2020)
- Jake Cousins (2020)
- Michael Crouse (2020–2022)
- Tyler Ladendorf (2020)
- Eric Stout (2020)
- Joey Terdoslavich (2020)
- T. J. Bennett (2021)
- Cam Booser (2021)
- Michael Bowden (2021)
- Jonathon Crawford (2021)
- Tyler Ferguson (2021)
- Christian Friedrich (2021)
- Connor Grey (2021)
- Anfernee Grier (2021–2022)
- Mickey Jannis (2022)
- Trevor Lane (2022–2023)
- James Reeves (2022–2023)
- Brian Schlitter (2022–2024)
- Charlie Tilson (2022)
- Stevie Wilkerson (2022)
- Braxton Davidson (2023)
- Payton Eeles (2023)
- Nick Heath (2023)
- Jake Newberry (2023)
- Joe Wieland (2023)
- Jason Bilous (2024)
- Narciso Crook (2024)
- Joey Marciano (2024)
- Keoni Cavaco (2025–present)
- Clint Coulter (2025)
- TJ Hopkins (2025–present)
- Will Kincanon (2025)
- Jeff Lindgren (2025)
- Anthony Ranaudo (2025–present)
- Chance Sisco (2025–present)
