= Anfernee Grier =

American baseball player (born 1995)

- Outfielder
- Born: October 13, 1995 (age 30); Phenix City, Alabama, U.S.
- Bats: Right Throws: Right
- Stats at Baseball Reference

Anfernee Antron Grier (born October 13, 1995) is an American former professional baseball outfielder. Grier played college baseball for the Auburn Tigers. He was drafted by the Arizona Diamondbacks 39th overall in the 2016 MLB draft. Despite his draft status, Grier never played in Major League Baseball (MLB).

== Career ==
=== Amateur ===
Grier attended Russell County High School in Seale, Alabama. He was drafted by the Detroit Tigers in the 39th round of the 2013 Major League Baseball draft, but did not sign and attended Auburn University where he played college baseball for the Auburn Tigers.

As a freshman at Auburn in 2014, Grier started 38 of 47 games and hit .255 with one home run over 149 at-bats. He missed 16 games due to an injury to his hand. As a sophomore, he started all 62 games and led the team with a .323 batting average, 82 hits, 41 runs scored, 22 doubles and three triples. He also had a home run, 20 RBI and nine stolen bases. After the season, Grier played for the United States collegiate national team.

=== Arizona Diamondbacks ===
With the 39th overall pick in the 2016 MLB draft, Grier was selected by the Arizona Diamondbacks. He signed with the Diamondbacks on June 15, 2016, was assigned to the Missoula Osprey, and after four games was promoted to the Hillsboro Hops. In 24 combined games between the two teams, he batted .236 with two home runs and eight RBIs. In 2017, he played for the Kane County Cougars where he slashed .251/.340/.331 with four home runs, 36 RBIs and thirty stolen bases in 123 games, and in 2018, he played with the Visalia Rawhide but appeared in only 34 games due to injury, hitting .208 with three home runs and eight RBIs. Grier did not play in a game in 2020 due to the cancellation of the minor league season because of the COVID-19 pandemic. He was released by the Diamondbacks organization on May 28, 2020.

=== Chicago Dogs ===
On March 17, 2021, Grier signed with the Chicago Dogs of the American Association of Professional Baseball. Grier appeared in 88 games for Chicago in 2021, slashing .308/.381/.476 with 10 home runs, 40 RBI, and 35 stolen bases.

In 2022, Grier played in 65 contests for the Dogs. In 252 at-bats, Grier batted .238/.302/.341 with 4 home runs, 28 RBI, and 10 stolen bases. He was released by the team on January 19, 2023.

In May 2023, Grier ended his playing career and became a supply chain manager.
