= Jason Bilous =

American baseball player (born 1997)

Free agent
- Pitcher
- Born: August 11, 1997 (age 28); Wilmington, Delaware, U.S.
- Bats: Right Throws: Right

Jason Peter Bilous (born August 11, 1997) is an American professional baseball pitcher who is a free agent.

== Amateur career ==
Bilous attended Caravel Academy in Bear, Delaware. As a junior in 2014, he went 11–1 with 84 strikeouts over 61 2/3 innings alongside batting .483. He underwent Tommy John surgery during the fall of his senior year, and did not play a game that season. He was selected by the Los Angeles Dodgers in the 29th round of the 2015 Major League Baseball draft, but did not sign and instead enrolled at Coastal Carolina University where he played college baseball.

In 2016, as a freshman at Coastal Carolina, Bilous pitched 44 2/3 innings, going 3–1 with a 4.43 ERA and 47 strikeouts as Coastal Carolina won the 2016 College World Series. As a sophomore in 2017, he appeared in 13 games (ten starts) in which he went 3–2 with a 4.61 ERA and sixty strikeouts over 52 2/3 innings. In 2016 and 2017, he played collegiate summer baseball with the Cotuit Kettleers of the Cape Cod Baseball League. In 2018, his junior year, he started 16 games and pitched to a 7–3 record and 4.00 ERA, striking out 105 over 83 1/3 innings. Following the season's end, he was selected by the Chicago White Sox in the 13th round of the 2018 Major League Baseball draft.

== Professional career ==
=== Chicago White Sox ===
Bilous signed with the White Sox and made his professional debut with the Great Falls Voyagers of the Rookie Advanced Pioneer League, going 0–4 with a 7.85 ERA over 36 2/3 innings. In 2019, he played with the Kannapolis Intimidators of the Class A South Atlantic League where he pitched to a 6–10 record with a 3.70 ERA over 31 games (17 starts), striking out 113 batters over 104 2/3 innings. He did not play a game in 2020 due to the cancellation of the minor league season caused by the COVID-19 pandemic. Bilous began the 2021 season with the Winston-Salem Dash of the High-A East and was promoted to the Birmingham Barons of the Double-A South in late May. Over twenty starts between the two clubs, Bilous went 3–8 with a 5.76 ERA and 106 strikeouts over 79 2/3 innings.

On November 19, 2021, Chicago selected Bilous' contract and added him to their 40-man roster. He returned to the Barons to open the 2022 season. In early August, he was promoted to the Charlotte Knights of the Triple-A International League. Over 31 games (21 starts) between the two teams, he went 6–11 with a 6.30 ERA, 131 strikeouts, and 79 walks over 105 2/3 innings.

On February 3, 2023, Bilous was designated for assignment by Chicago following the acquisition of Frank German.

=== Cleveland Guardians ===
On February 9, 2023, Bilous was claimed off waivers by the Cleveland Guardians. The Guardians designated Bilous for assignment on March 30. He cleared waivers and was sent outright to the Triple-A Columbus Clippers on April 1. In 38 appearances for Columbus, Bilous posted a 5.92 ERA with 56 strikeouts across 48 2/3 innings pitched. He was released by the Guardians organization on March 24, 2024.

=== Chicago Dogs ===
On April 2, 2024, Bilous signed with the Chicago Dogs of the American Association of Professional Baseball. In eight games for Chicago, he logged a 5.33 ERA with 32 strikeouts across 25 1/3 innings pitched. On June 16, Bilous was released by the Dogs.

On April 16, 2025, Bilous signed with the High Point Rockers of the Atlantic League of Professional Baseball. However, he was released prior to the start of the season on April 23.

=== Tecolotes de los Dos Laredos ===
On May 7, 2025, Bilous signed with the Tecolotes de los Dos Laredos of the Mexican League. He made one appearance for the team, allowing three runs on one hit and one walk, and failed to record an out. Bilous was released by the Tecolotes on May 12.
