= Chance Sisco =

American baseball player (born 1995)

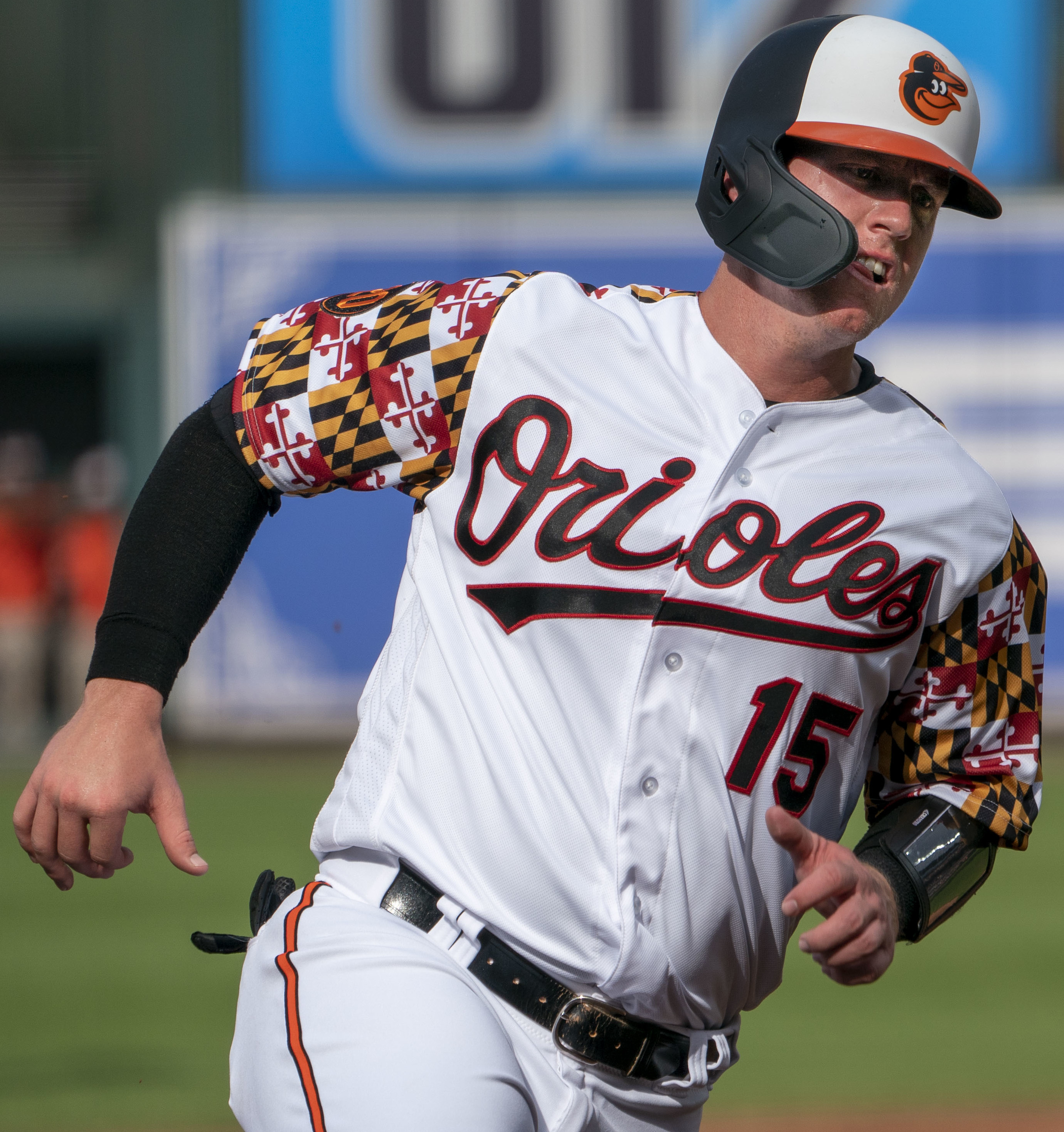
- Sisco with the Orioles in 2019
- Catcher
- Born: February 24, 1995 (age 31); Corona, California, U.S.
- Batted: Left Threw: Right

MLB debut
- September 2, 2017, for the Baltimore Orioles

Last MLB appearance
- September 3, 2021, for the New York Mets

MLB statistics
- Batting average: .197
- Home runs: 16
- Runs batted in: 54
- Stats at Baseball Reference

Teams
- Baltimore Orioles (2017–2021); New York Mets (2021)

Chance Thomas Leo Sisco (born February 24, 1995) is an American former professional baseball catcher. He played in Major League Baseball (MLB) for the Baltimore Orioles and New York Mets from 2017 to 2021.

== Amateur career ==
Sisco initially attended Temescal Canyon High School in Lake Elsinore, California. Sisco transferred to Santiago High School in Corona, California, for his junior year. Originally a shortstop and pitcher, he begin catching his senior year of high school. The Baltimore Orioles selected Sisco in the second round of the 2013 Major League Baseball draft. He opted to sign with the Orioles rather than play college baseball at the University of Oregon.

== Professional career ==
=== Baltimore Orioles ===
Sisco made his professional debut that season for the rookie-level Gulf Coast League Orioles and ended the year with the Aberdeen IronBirds. He finished his first year hitting .363/.468/.451 with one home run and 11 RBI in 33 games. Sisco played the 2014 season with the Delmarva Shorebirds. He won the SAL batting title after hitting .340 with five home runs, 63 RBI and a .854 on-base plus slugging (OPS).

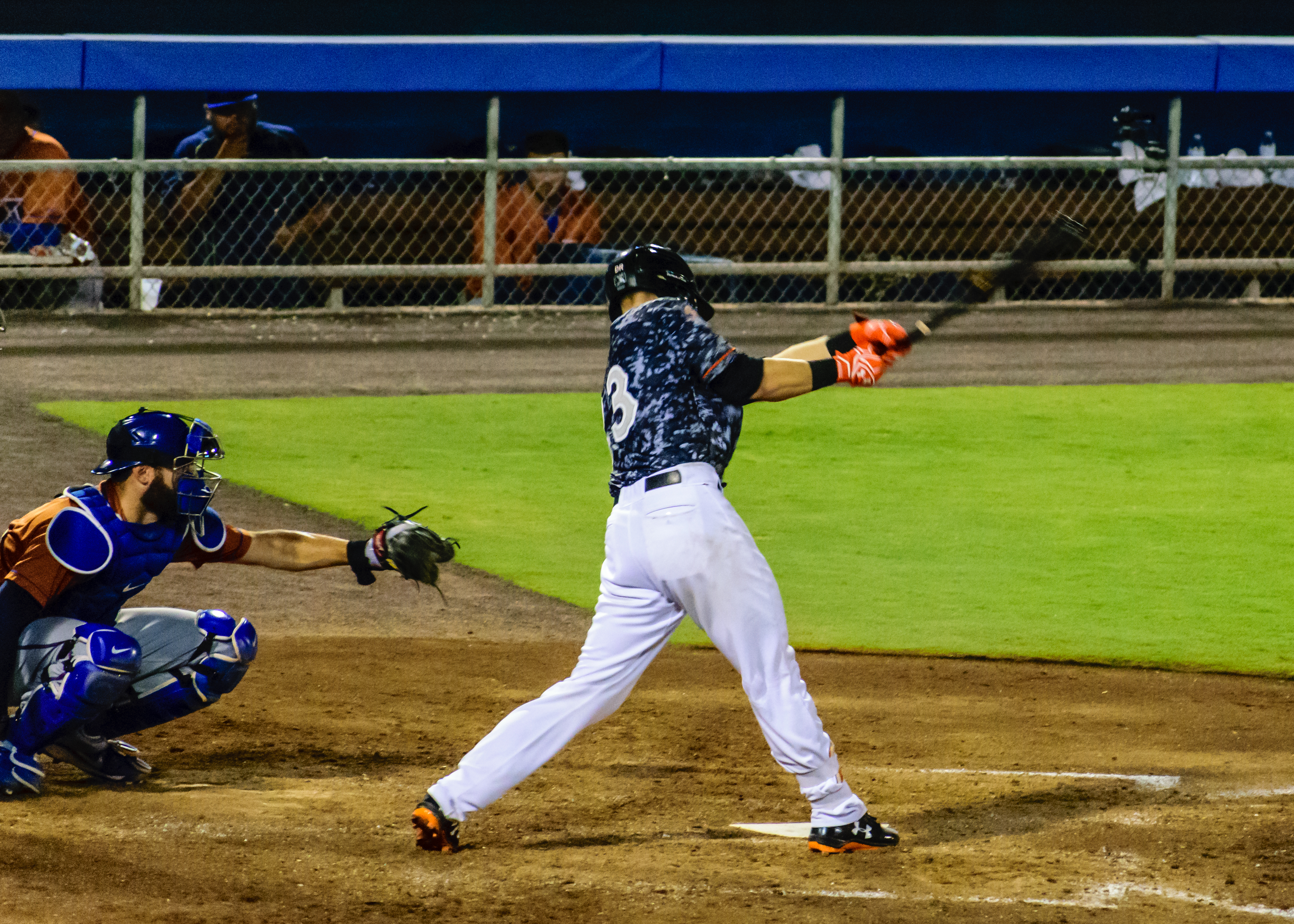
Sisco with the Norfolk Tides in 2017

In 2015, Sisco played for the Frederick Keys and the Bowie Baysox where he batted a combined .297 with six home runs and 34 RBIs in 95 games. After the season he played in the Arizona Fall League. Sisco played 2016 with Bowie and the Norfolk Tides. In July, he played in the All-Star Futures Game. In 116 games between the two clubs he slashed .317/.403/.430 with six home runs and 51 RBIs. Sisco spent 2017 with Norfolk where he batted .267 with four home runs and 47 RBIs in 97 games before being recalled by Baltimore.

Sisco received his first-ever promotion to the Orioles on September 1, 2017. He made his MLB debut the following night as a defensive replacement in the ninth inning of a 7–2 loss to the Toronto Blue Jays at Camden Yards. He achieved his first major league hit with a pinch-hit double off Masahiro Tanaka in the seventh, then followed it up with his first home run off Giovanny Gallegos in his subsequent plate appearance two innings later in a 13–5 defeat to the New York Yankees at Yankee Stadium on September 14.

In 2018, Sisco made the Orioles' Opening Day roster after hitting .419 in spring training. He was expected to be the backup catcher to Caleb Joseph. However, after batting only .218/.340/.328 in 47 games, he was optioned to Norfolk. He ended batting .181 on the season.

In 59 games for the Orioles in 2019, Sisco posted a batting line of .210/.333/.395 with career-highs in home runs (8) and RBI (20). In 2020 for the Orioles, Sisco slashed .214/.364/.378 with four home runs and ten RBI.

Sisco began the 2021 season sharing catching duties with Pedro Severino, but was optioned to Triple-A Norfolk in favor of Austin Wynns on May 31 after stumbling to a .154/.247/.185 batting line in 23 games. On June 18, Sisco was designated for assignment by Baltimore.

=== New York Mets ===
On June 25, 2021, Sisco was claimed off of waivers by the New York Mets. He was then optioned to the Triple-A Syracuse Mets. Sisco played in 5 games in the Major Leagues for the Mets, hitting .111 with 1 RBI, his only hit an RBI double in the top of the 12th inning in San Francisco against the Giants. Sisco was designated for assignment by the Mets on September 28. On October 5, Sisco elected free agency.

=== Minnesota Twins ===
On March 16, 2022, Sisco signed a minor league deal with the Seattle Mariners that included an invite to spring training. On April 2, Sisco was released by the Mariners organization.

On April 4, 2022, Sisco signed a minor league contract with the Minnesota Twins organization. He played in 10 games for the Triple-A St. Paul Saints, hitting .194/.207/.355 with one home run and 3 RBI. He elected free agency following the season on November 10.

On January 5, 2023, Sisco re-signed with the Twins organization on a minor league contract. He was released by the organization on March 24.

=== Acereros de Monclova ===
On April 4, 2023, Sisco signed with the Acereros de Monclova of the Mexican League. In 3 games, he went 0-for-8 with a walk, two strikeouts, and one run scored. Sisco was released on April 26.

=== Long Island Ducks ===
On May 9, 2023, Sisco signed with the Long Island Ducks of the Atlantic League of Professional Baseball. In 31 games for the Ducks, he hit .305/.468/.716 with 11 home runs and 33 RBI.

On March 19, 2024, Sisco re-signed a new contract with the Ducks for the 2024 season. In 65 games for Long Island, Sisco slashed .261/.392/.563 with 16 home runs and 45 RBI.

=== St. Louis Cardinals ===
On August 30, 2024, Sisco signed a minor league contract with the St. Louis Cardinals. In 7 games for the Triple–A Memphis Redbirds, he went 5–for–23 (.217) with 1 home run and 5 RBI.

On November 5, 2024, Sisco re–signed with the Cardinals on a minor league contract. After going 0-for-9 with six strikeouts in seven spring training games, Sisco was released by the Cardinals organization on March 19, 2025.

=== Chicago Dogs ===
On April 14, 2025, Sisco signed with the Chicago Dogs of the American Association of Professional Baseball. In 95 appearances for the Dogs, he batted .301/.404/.573 with 17 home runs, 61 RBI, and one stolen base.

Sisco played in 65 games for Chicago in 2026, slashing .315/.430/.546 with 13 home runs and 49 RBI. On September 18, 2026, Sisco announced his retirement from professional baseball via his personal Instagram account.

== Personal life ==
Sisco and his wife, Jordan, married in 2018.
