= Chad Girodo =

American baseball player (born 1991)

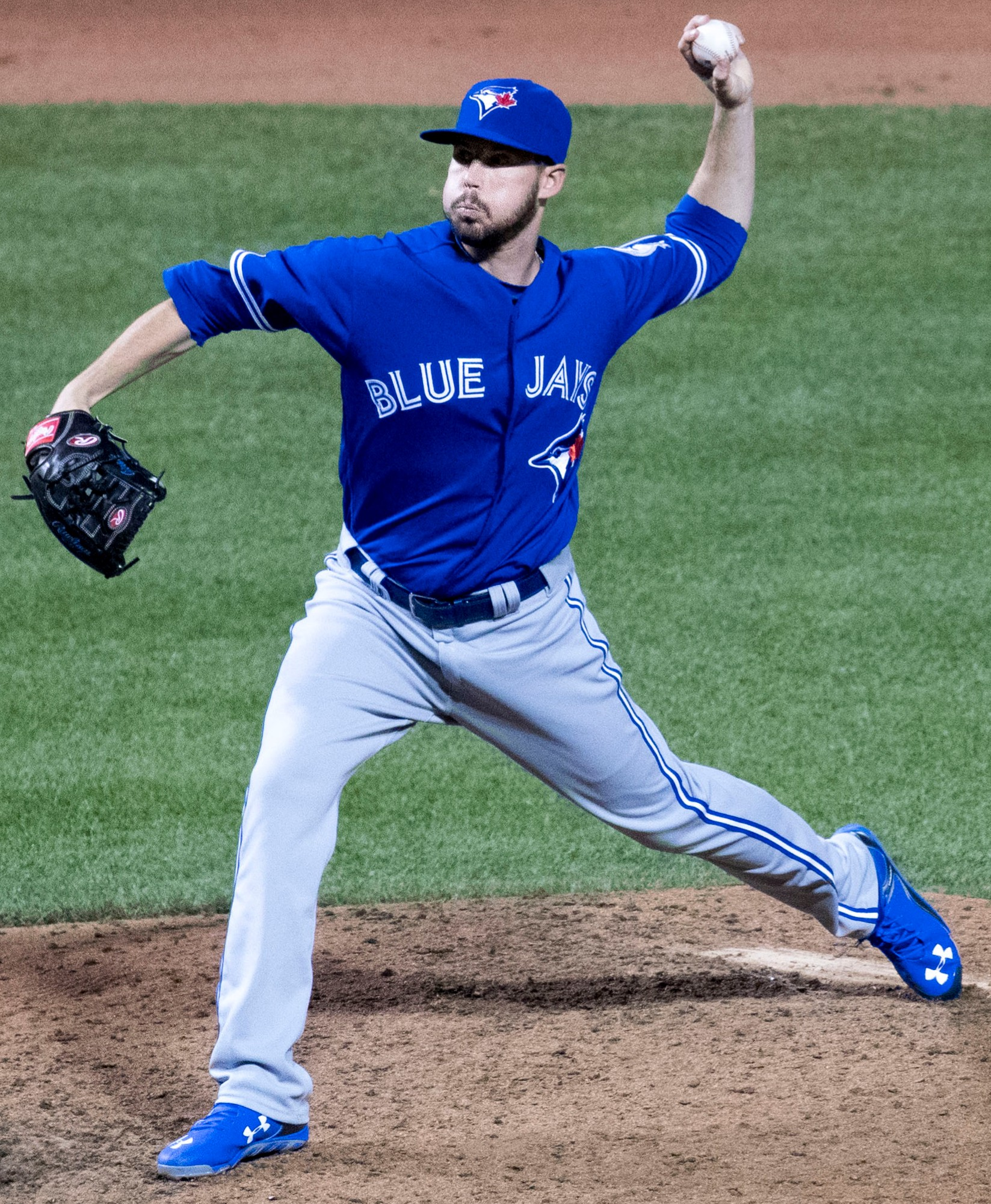
- Girodo with the Toronto Blue Jays
- Pitcher
- Born: February 6, 1991 (age 35); Decatur, Alabama, U.S.
- Batted: Left Threw: Left

MLB debut
- April 22, 2016, for the Toronto Blue Jays

Last MLB appearance
- June 19, 2016, for the Toronto Blue Jays

MLB statistics
- Win–loss record: 0–0
- Earned run average: 4.35
- Strikeouts: 5
- Stats at Baseball Reference

Teams
- Toronto Blue Jays (2016)

Chad Alan Girodo (born February 6, 1991) is an American former professional baseball pitcher. He played in Major League Baseball (MLB) for the Toronto Blue Jays, who drafted him in 2013. Girodo played in the Blue Jays' minor league organization for parts of four seasons before being called up to the Major Leagues for the first time on April 22, 2016.

== High school & college ==
Girodo was a four-year letter winner at Hartselle High School, playing mostly as a starting pitcher. In his senior year, he pitched to a 17–1 win–loss record and 0.47 earned run average (ERA) with 136 strikeouts in 105 1/3 innings. Girodo then attended Mississippi State University, where he made 47 appearances over three years with the Bulldogs, mostly in relief.

== Professional career ==
=== Toronto Blue Jays ===
==== Minor leagues ====
In the 2013 Major League Baseball draft, Girodo was selected in the 9th round by the Toronto Blue Jays, and assigned to the Single-A Lansing Lugnuts. In 14 appearances that season, he would post a 1–1 record, 4.18 ERA, and 24 strikeouts in 23 2/3 innings.

In 2014, Girodo was assigned to the High-A Dunedin Blue Jays for the entire season. In 47 appearances totalling a career-high 76 2/3 innings, he pitched to a 7–3 record, 2.47 ERA, and 81 strikeouts. Girodo began the 2015 season in Dunedin, where he was a Florida State League mid-season All-Star. He was promoted to the Double-A New Hampshire Fisher Cats in June, and to the Triple-A Buffalo Bisons in September. In 45 total appearances in 2015, Girodo would post a stellar 1.34 ERA, 4–2 record, and 58 strikeouts in 60 1/3 innings. During the offseason, he appeared in 7 games for the Salt River Rafters of the Arizona Fall League, recording a 1.80 ERA in 10 innings pitched.

Girodo was invited to Major League spring training on January 12, 2016. He was reassigned to minor league camp on March 25, and was assigned to Triple-A Buffalo to open the season. He made four appearances for the team, posting a 2–0 record, 1.35 ERA, and seven strikeouts in 6 2/3 innings prior to his promotion.

==== Major leagues ====
On April 22, 2016, Girodo was called up by the Blue Jays. He pitched two scoreless innings in relief that evening against the Oakland Athletics in his Major League debut. After Brett Cecil was placed on the disabled list, Girodo became the main lefty specialist for the Blue Jays. He was optioned back to Buffalo on April 23, and recalled on May 3. Girodo was optioned back to Buffalo at the end of May, and recalled by the Blue Jays on June 15. On February 9, 2017, Girodo was designated for assignment by the Blue Jays. After clearing waivers, he was assigned to Triple-A Buffalo and invited to Major League spring training. Girodo spent the entire season in the minors, going 2–4 with a 2.96 ERA in 31 games. On January 24, 2018, the Blue Jays invited Girodo to spring training. He was released on April 25.

=== Los Angeles Dodgers ===
Girodo was signed to a minor league contract with the Los Angeles Dodgers on May 7, 2018, and was assigned to the Double–A Tulsa Drillers. He pitched in seven games for the Drillers and six for the Oklahoma City Dodgers before he was released on June 16.

=== Chicago Dogs ===
On July 10, 2018, Girodo signed with the Chicago Dogs of the American Association of Independent Professional Baseball. He made 22 appearances for Chicago, registering a 2–0 record and 4.37 ERA with 19 strikeouts across 22 2/3 innings pitched. Girodo was released by the Dogs on April 9, 2019.
