= New Britain Rock Cats =

- 1983–2015; New Britain, Connecticut
Team logo
Cap insignia

Minor league affiliations
- Class: Double-A (1983–2015)
- League: Eastern League (1983–2015)

Major league affiliations
- Team: Colorado Rockies (2015); Minnesota Twins (1995–2014); Boston Red Sox (1983–1994)

Minor league titles
- League titles (2): 1983; 2001
- Division titles (2): 1998; 2001

Team data
- Name: New Britain Rock Cats (1997–2015); Hardware City Rock Cats (1995–1996); New Britain Red Sox (1983–1994)
- Colors: Red, Black, Gray, Tan, White
- Mascot: Rocky The Rock Cat (1995–2015); The Bee (1983–1994)
- Ballpark: New Britain Stadium (1996–2015); Beehive Field (1983–1995)

The New Britain Rock Cats were a Minor League Baseball team that competed in the Eastern League. They were the Double-A affiliate of the Boston Red Sox for 12 years, the Minnesota Twins for 20 years, and the Colorado Rockies for one. They played their home games at New Britain Stadium in New Britain, Connecticut. The team moved to Dunkin' Donuts Park in nearby Hartford before the 2016 season, becoming the Hartford Yard Goats.

== History ==
The franchise's timeline can be traced back to Pittsfield, Massachusetts, where they were a Boston Red Sox Double-A affiliate from 1965 to 1969. The franchise then moved to Pawtucket, Rhode Island in 1970, and spent three years in the Ocean State. When the Pawtucket Red Sox became a Triple-A team in 1973, the Red Sox moved their Double-A franchise to Bristol, Connecticut. Known as the Bristol Red Sox, the team played at Muzzy Field for ten seasons from 1973 to 1982. Starting with the 1983 season, owner Joe Buzas moved the team some ten miles east to New Britain. Then known as the New Britain Red Sox, the team played its home games at Beehive Field, which is still standing next to the current stadium.

As Beehive Field became outdated and new facilities began to appear in other cities around the league, Buzas was faced with the choice of staying in New Britain and building a new stadium, versus moving the franchise again. The Red Sox front office, led by Dan Duquette, supported the idea of moving to Springfield, Massachusetts, because it was closer to their fan base and closer to the Western Massachusetts home of Duquette. Ultimately, however, in August 1994, Buzas decided to keep the franchise in New Britain. The Red Sox promptly pulled their affiliation and instead affiliated with the Trenton Thunder in the capital city of New Jersey, which was further away from the fan base. For the 1995 season, Buzas, who owned the Salt Lake Buzz (Minnesota Triple-A), signed a new development agreement with the Minnesota Twins, an affiliation that lasted until the end of the 2014 season. During the 1995 season (their only season in Beehive Field), the team was known as the Hardware City Rock Cats, a reference to New Britain's nickname "The Hardware City". The current ballpark, New Britain Stadium, opened in 1996. The team name changed to "New Britain" Rock Cats in 1997. Stanley Works continues to be a significant sponsor of the team and ballpark.

During 2003 and 2004, the team was involved in several lawsuits over its night game fireworks displays. A group of residents living near the stadium claimed the noise was disruptive, and the ash and debris damaged their cars and homes. In May 2005, after attending a game, Judge Marshall Berger let the shows continue, but ruled they be limited to once monthly and use quieter fireworks.

On July 12, 2008, the Rock Cats established a franchise record for single game attendance. The crowd of 8,115 marked the first time the 8,000 mark was surpassed for a game at New Britain Stadium. This record was broken on June 27, 2009, with a crowd of 8,212. On July 10, 2013, the Rock Cats hosted the Eastern League All-Star Game at New Britain Stadium. The event drew 8,633 fans, shattering the previous single game attendance record. The Rock Cats reached the 8,000 mark once again on May 31, 2014 with a crowd of 8,079. The record was ultimately broken on August 28, 2015, when 8,672 fans watched the team's last Friday home game.

On June 4, 2014, it was announced that the Rock Cats would move to Hartford, Connecticut, in 2016, signing a 25-year lease for a new stadium that would be built. On March 18, 2015, the team announced it would be known as the Hartford Yard Goats beginning in 2016. On June 17, 2014, it was announced that the Hartford Yard Goats new stadium for the 2016 season would be named Dunkin' Donuts Park. The Rock Cats played their last game at New Britain Stadium on August 30, 2015.

On September 16, 2014, the Minnesota Twins severed their affiliation ties with the Rock Cats, and the Rock Cats signed a two-year player development deal with the Colorado Rockies the next day.

== Popular culture ==
The New Britain Rock Cats were featured in an episode of ESPN's Mayne Street short comedy series.

An article about the Rock Cats can be seen below an article about the South Carolina Buzz (the fictional AAA affiliate of the Twins) during a bus scene in Major League: Back to the Minors.

== Notable alumni ==
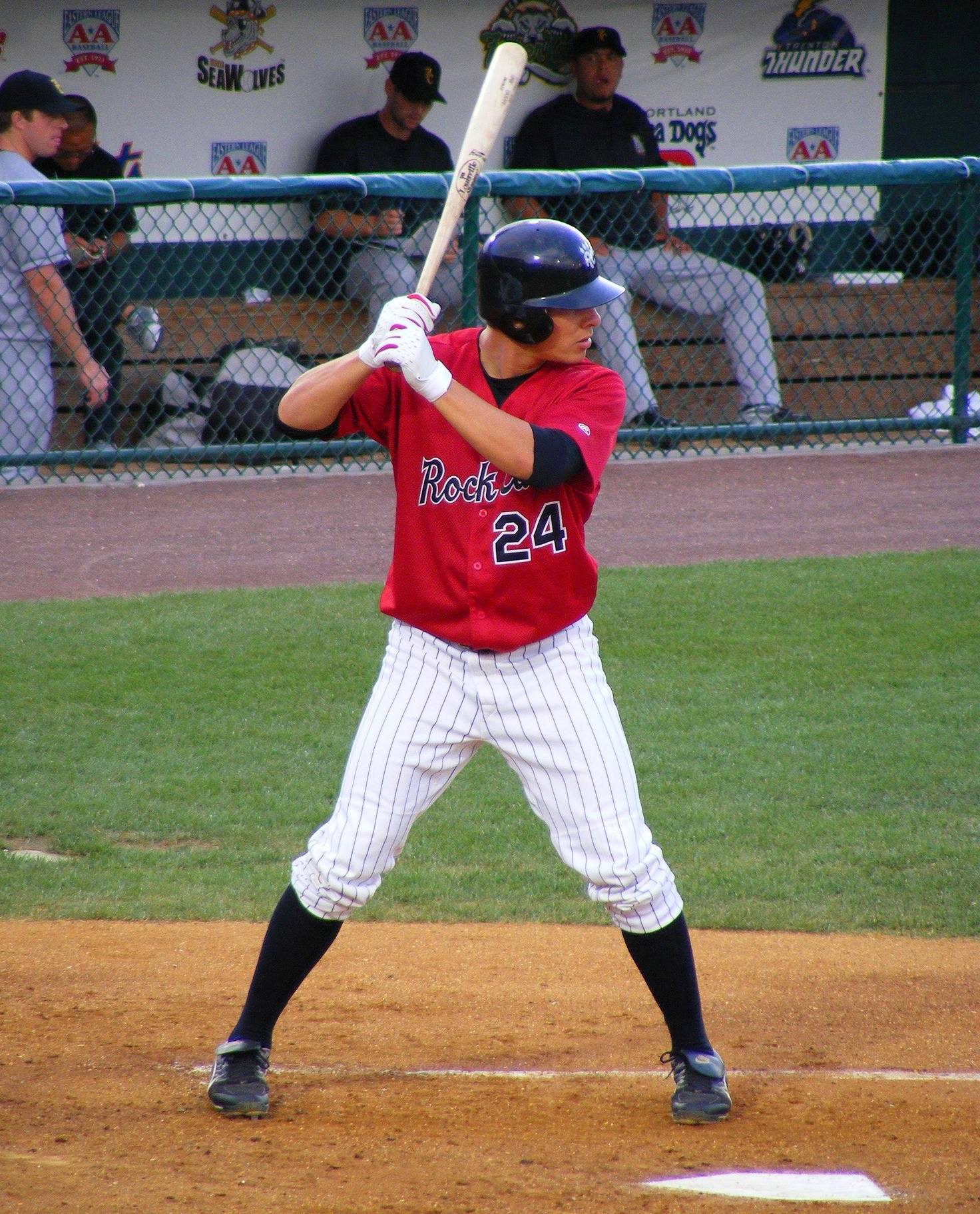
Danny Valencia with the Rock Cats

- Torii Hunter (1996–98)
- Corey Koskie (1997)
- David Ortiz (1997 and 2001)
- Doug Mientkiewicz (1997–98)
- A. J. Pierzynski (1998 and 2000)
- Michael Cuddyer (2000–01)
- Juan Rincón (2000–01)
- Justin Morneau (2001–03 and 2015)
- Joe Mauer (2003)
- Pat Neshek (2003–05)
- Francisco Liriano (2004–05)
- Denard Span (2005–06)
- Danny Valencia (2008)
- Yangervis Solarte (2010–2011)
- Miguel Sano (2013)
- Danny Santana (2013)
- Jorge Polanco (2014)
- Trevor Story (2015)

== Season records ==
Season	Manager	W-L	Win %	Finish	Playoffs	Results
1995	Sal Butera	65–77	.458	5th		
1996	Al Newman	61–81	.430	5th		
1997	Al Newman	70–72	.493	3rd		
1998	John Russell	83–59	.585	1st	Won Semifinals; Lost League Championship Series	New Britain 3, Binghamton 1 Harrisburg 3, New Britain 1
1999	John Russell	59–82	.418	5th		
2000	John Russell	51–91	.359	6th		
2001	Stan Cliburn	87–55	.613	1st	Won Semifinals; League Championship Series Cancelled ^{1}	New Britain 3, Norwich 1 New Britain 0, Reading 0
2002	Stan Cliburn	67–72	.482	4th		
2003	Stan Cliburn	73–68	.518	2nd	Lost Semifinals	New Haven 3, New Britain 2
2004	Stan Cliburn	70–70	.500	3rd		
2005	Stan Cliburn	70–71	.496	4th		
2006	Riccardo Ingram	64–78	.451	6th		
2007	Riccardo Ingram	69–72	.489	4th		
2008	Bobby Cuellar	64–77	.454	5th		
2009	Tom Nieto	72–69	.511	2nd	Lost Semifinals	Connecticut Defenders 3, New Britain 1
2010	Jeff Smith	44–98	.310	6th		
2011	Jeff Smith	72–70	.507	3rd		
2012	Jeff Smith	75–67	.528	3rd		
2013	Jeff Smith	66–76	.465	5th		
2014	Jeff Smith	73–69	.514	3rd		
2015	Darin Everson	69–71	.493	4th		

^{1}2001 League Championship was canceled due to the 9/11 terrorist attacks.

== Mascots ==
Game Mascots:

- Rocky the Rock Cat (main mascot)
- Rookie the Rock Cat (Rocky's nephew)
- Sandy the Lion
- Blooper the Walrus
- Toner the Advance Copy's Copy Cat

Sponsored Inning Mascots:

- The Dunkin' Donuts Trio – Coffee, Iced Coffee, and Donut

== See also ==
- Professional baseball in Connecticut

Preceded by Bristol Red Sox	Boston Red Sox; Double-A affiliate 1983–1994	Succeeded by Trenton Thunder
