= Keoni Cavaco =

American baseball player (born 2001)

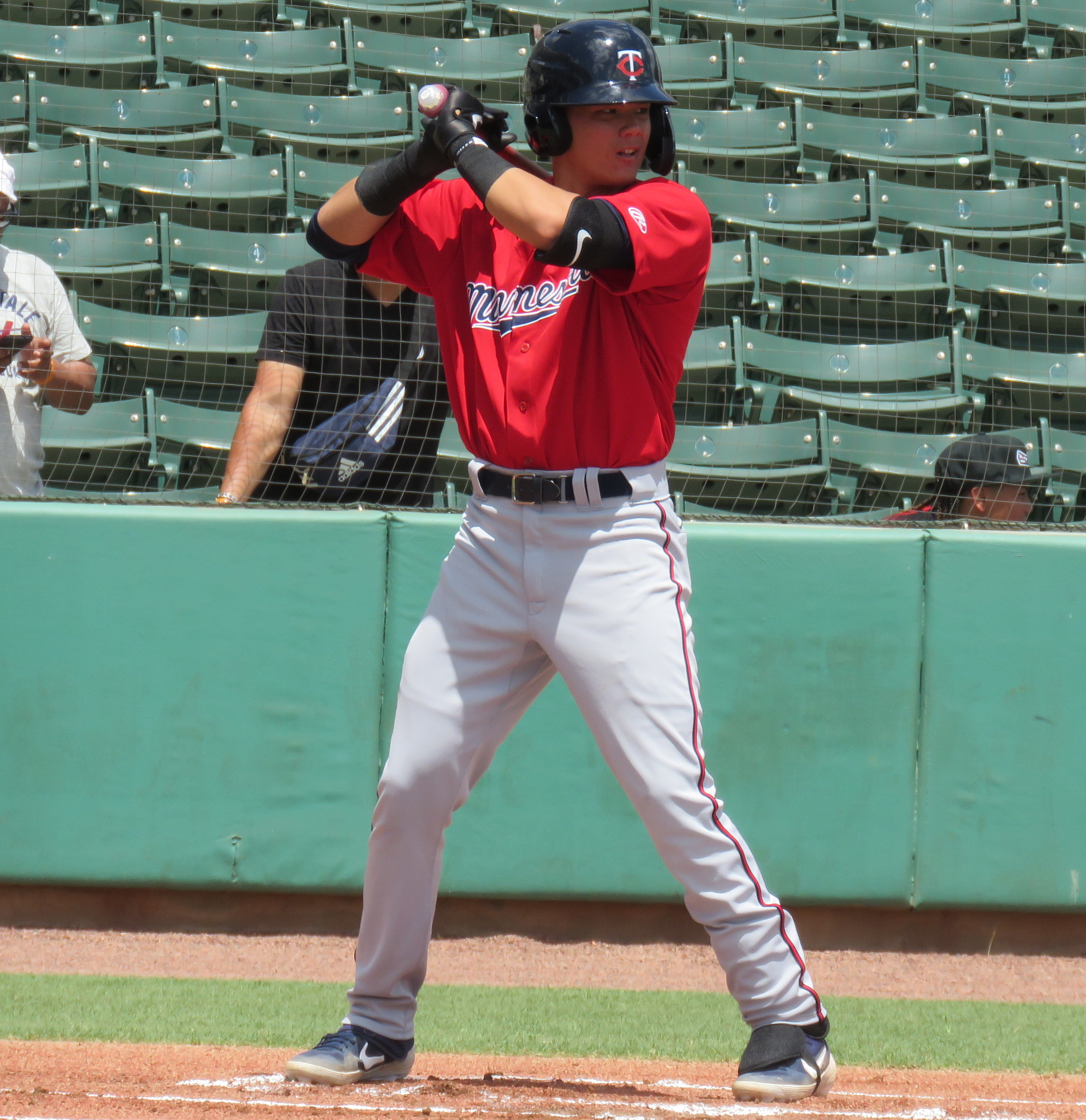
- Cavaco with the Gulf Coast League Twins in 2019

Free agent
- Infielder / Pitcher
- Born: June 2, 2001 (age 25); Chula Vista, California, U.S.
- Bats: Switch Throws: Right
- Stats at Baseball Reference

Keoni Kealakekua Cavaco (born June 2, 2001) is an American professional baseball pitcher who is a free agent. He was drafted by the Minnesota Twins as an infielder in the first round of the 2019 MLB draft.

== Career ==
=== Amateur ===
Cavaco attended Eastlake High School in Chula Vista, California. In 2019, his senior year, he hit .433 with eight home runs and 16 steals along with pitching to a 0.67 ERA. He committed to play college baseball at San Diego State University.

=== Minnesota Twins ===
Cavaco was drafted by the Minnesota Twins in the first round with the 13th overall selection of the 2019 Major League Baseball draft. He signed for $4.05 million. After signing, he was assigned to the Rookie-level Gulf Coast League Twins with whom he spent all of his first professional season. Over 25 games, he hit .172 with one home run and six RBI. He did not play in a game in 2020 due to the cancellation of the minor league season because of the COVID-19 pandemic.

For the 2021 season, Cavaco was assigned to the Fort Myers Mighty Mussels of the Low-A Southeast, slashing .233/.296/.301 with two home runs and 24 RBI over sixty games. He returned to Fort Myers for the 2022 season. Over 99 games, he hit .231 with 11 home runs and 59 RBI.

Cavaco spent the 2023 campaign with the High–A Cedar Rapids Kernels, also making four appearances for the FCL Twins. In 59 games with Cedar Rapids, he batted .193/.266/.287 with five home runs and 14 RBI. Cavaco returned to Cedar Rapids in 2024, and struggled to a .144/.202/.327 batting line with four home runs and 13 RBI across 34 games. Cavaco was released by the Twins organization on June 17, 2024.

=== Houston Astros ===
On June 26, 2024, Cavaco signed a minor league contract with the Houston Astros. He was subsequently assigned to the rookie–level Florida Complex League Astros, where he was converted into a pitcher. Cavaco did not appear for the organization, and was released by Houston on March 12, 2025.

=== Chicago Dogs ===
On April 14, 2025, Cavaco signed with the Chicago Dogs of the American Association of Professional Baseball. He made 22 appearances (including 13 starts) for Chicago, compiling a 4-8 record and 4.10 ERA with 53 strikeouts across 79 innings pitched.

Cavaco pitched in two games for the Dogs in 2026, but struggled to an 0-1 record and 9.00 ERA with two strikeouts over two innings of work. Cavaco was released by Chicago on June 12, 2026.
