= Jeff Smith (baseball) =

- In 2008 with a Fort Myers Miracle fan
- Catcher / Coach / Manager
- Born: June 7, 1974 (age 51); Akron, Ohio
- Bats: Left Throws: Right
- Stats at Baseball Reference

Jeff Smith (born June 17, 1974) is an American former professional baseball player and coach.

== Career ==
=== Playing career ===
Smith played collegiately for Stetson University. From 1993 to 1995, he played collegiate summer baseball for the Orleans Cardinals of the Cape Cod Baseball League, where he greatly improved his draft stock by being named to the league all-star team in 1994 and hitting .260 in 1995. He was selected as a catcher by the Twins in the twentieth round of the 1995 Major League Baseball draft, and played at various levels within the organization from 1996 - 2002. Smith also played minor league ball with the Boston Red Sox in 2003, and the Texas Rangers in 2003 and 2004 until major left knee surgery after the 2004 season ended his career. He has no Major League experience.

=== Minor League coaching career ===
Smith accepted his first coaching job as hitting coach of the Gulf Coast League Twins before the start of the 2005 season. He was promoted to manager of the Beloit Snappers, the Twins' Midwest League Single-A affiliate the following year. He guided the Snappers into the post-season both seasons at the helm, compiling a 153-125 record for a .550 winning percentage. He was named Baseball America Class A Manager of the Year in 2007.

=== Fort Myers Miracle ===
In 2008, Smith was promoted again to the Twins' advanced-A affiliate, the Fort Myers Miracle. In his first half season managing the Miracle, they captured the Florida State League first-half West Division title with a 45-24 record, tying the franchise record set in 2000 for wins in a half season. In the FSL Western division playoffs, the Miracle swept the second half winning Dunedin Blue Jays in two games to capture their first division crown since 1995. They lost the championship series to the Daytona Cubs in four games.

In Smith's second season as manager, the Miracle achieved a franchise first by capturing both the first and second half division crowns in the Florida State League's newly realigned South Division. They faced the Charlotte Stone Crabs, who finished second both halves, in the South Division Finals. Despite a 14-6 regular season record against the Stone Crabs, the Miracle lost in three games to Charlotte. On August 31, Jeff Smith was honored as the FSL’s Manager of Year. Following the season, he replaced Tom Nieto as manager of the New Britain Rock Cats.

=== New Britain Rock Cats ===
Smith's success in the Florida State League did not carry over to the Eastern League, as the Cats narrowly avoided a hundred losses (44-98) his first season at the helm, and had the worst record in Minor league baseball. His struggles would continue on through the next 2 seasons as the Cats would miss the playoffs by 1 game in each of those season, 2013 brought even worse struggles as the Rock Cats finished in 5th place with a record of 66-76. Overall, in five seasons as manager of Rock Cats, Smith managed the team to a 330-380 record, and .465 winning percentage. In 2015, he returned to Fort Myers.

=== Twins first base coach ===
On December 21, 2016, Smith was named first base coach of the Minnesota Twins. His duties will also assist with baserunning instruction and oversee catching instruction.
