= Bobby Cuellar =

American baseball player (1952–2025)

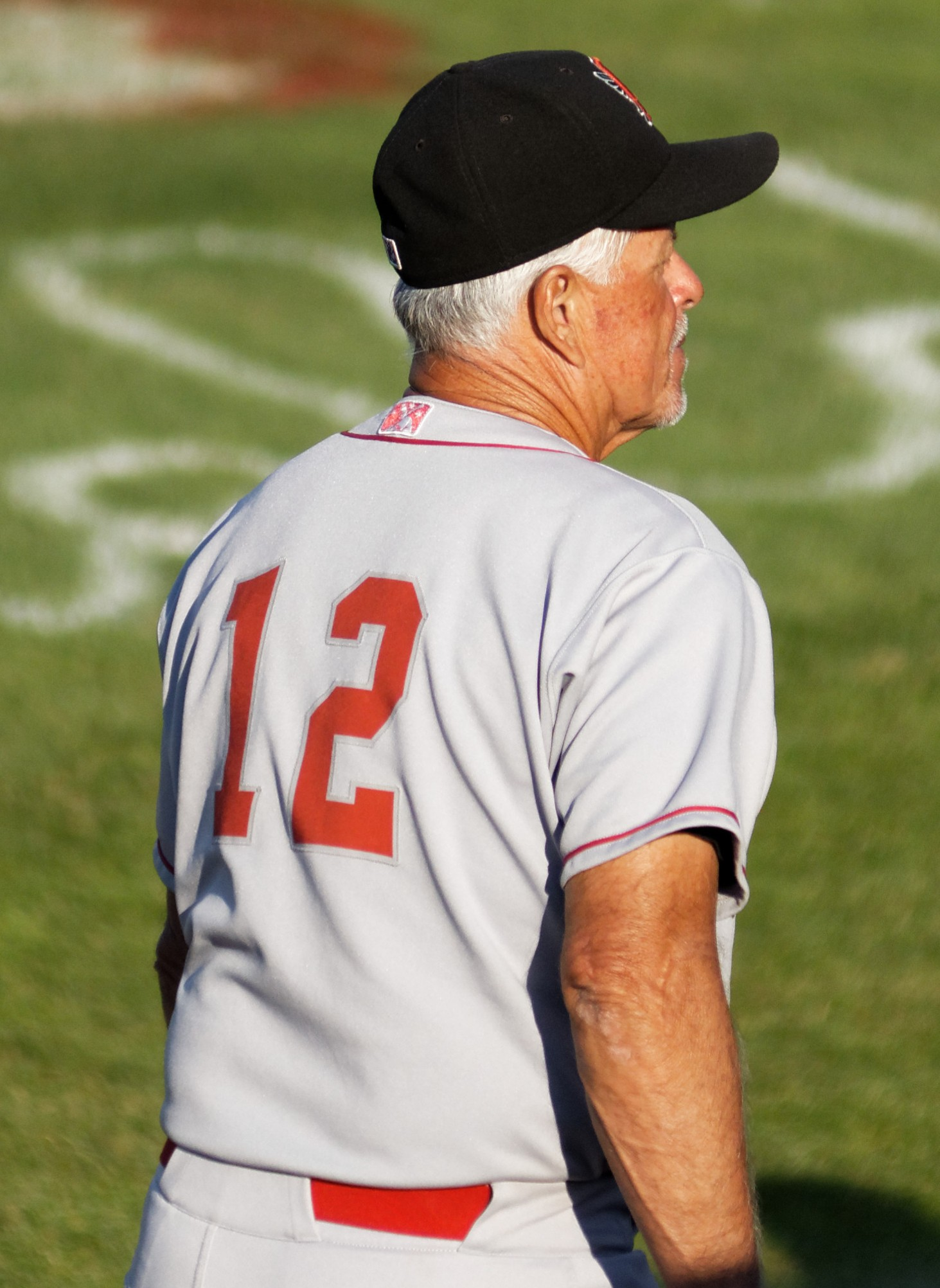
- Cuellar with the Great Lakes Loons in 2016
- Pitcher / Coach
- Born: August 20, 1952; Alice, Texas, U.S.
- Died: January 20, 2025 (aged 72); Houston, Texas, U.S.
- Batted: Right Threw: Right

MLB debut
- September 9, 1977, for the Texas Rangers

Last MLB appearance
- September 20, 1977, for the Texas Rangers

MLB statistics
- Win–loss record: 0–0
- Earned run average: 1.35
- Strikeouts: 3
- Stats at Baseball Reference

Teams
- As player: Texas Rangers (1977); As coach: Seattle Mariners (1995–1996); Montreal Expos (1997–2000); Texas Rangers (2001); Pittsburgh Pirates (2006–2007); Minnesota Twins (2013–2014)

Robert Cuellar (August 20, 1952 – January 20, 2025) was an American professional baseball player who played briefly with the Texas Rangers of the Major League Baseball (MLB) in 1977 as a relief pitcher. He held several coaching positions in baseball, including pitching coach, bullpen coach, and manager. Cuellar was later a special assistant in the player development department of the Los Angeles Dodgers.

== Background ==
Cuellar was born in Alice, Texas, on August 20, 1952. He was a graduate from the University of Texas and was of Mexican American descent.

== Playing career ==
Cuellar was selected by the Texas Rangers in the 29th round (592nd overall) of the 1974 MLB draft. Bobby Cuellar played in the minor leagues from 1974 to 1981, finishing his career with one season in Mexico. He briefly had a "cup of coffee" with the Texas Rangers in 1977 appearing in four games before returning to the minor leagues at Tucson.

== Coaching career ==
Due to also pitching winter ball during his career as a pitcher and the lack of pitch counts in the 1970s, he overused and eventually wore out his shoulder. After his career was over, he went on to a career in coaching and managing. Beginning in 1983, he worked in the Seattle Mariners' organization until 1996. Since then, in addition to stints on the major league coaching staffs of the Montreal Expos, Texas Rangers, and Pittsburgh Pirates, Cuellar spent six years coaching in the Minnesota Twins' minor league system. While in the Twins system he mentored a young Johan Santana who he taught to throw a circle changeup, the importance of trusting in his ability to throw it and made him repeatedly throw it in minor league games. Adding this pitch, which would go on to become his most notorious, to his rotation made Santana extremely effective and within the space of a full season from 2001 to 2002 Santana went from an average pitcher with control issues and a 4.74 ERA to a 2.99 ERA ace who would be in contention for the best pitcher in baseball over the next 5 seasons, repeatedly citing Cuellar's influence. He was chosen for the 2023 Mike Coolbaugh Award in recognition of his "outstanding baseball work ethic, knowledge of the game, and skill in mentoring young players on the field." His resume includes:

- 1983–1985 Seattle Mariners, Minor League Coach
- 1986–1987 Wausau Timbers, Manager
- 1988–1988 San Bernardino Spirit, Pitching Coach
- 1989–1990 Williamsport Bills, Pitching Coach
- 1991–1991 Jacksonville Suns, Pitching Coach
- 1992–1993 Seattle Mariners, Minor League Pitching Instructor
- 1994–1994 Calgary Cannons, Pitching Coach
- 1995–1996 Seattle Mariners, Pitching Coach
- 1997–2000 Montreal Expos, Pitching Coach
- 2001–2001 Texas Rangers, Bullpen Coach
- 2002–2002 Edmonton Trappers, Pitching Coach
- 2003–2005 Rochester Red Wings, Pitching Coach
- 2006–2007 Pittsburgh Pirates, Bullpen Coach
- 2008–2008 New Britain Rock Cats, Manager
- 2009–2012 Rochester Red Wings, Pitching Coach
- 2013–2014 Minnesota Twins, bullpen coach
- 2015 Ogden Raptors, pitching coach
- 2016: Great Lakes Loons, pitching coach
- 2017: Ogden Raptors, pitching coach
- 2018–2019: Great Lakes Loons, pitching coach

== Death ==
Cuellar died after suffering a heart attack in Houston, Texas, on January 20, 2025. He was 72.
