= Stan Cliburn =

American baseball player and manager (1956–2026)

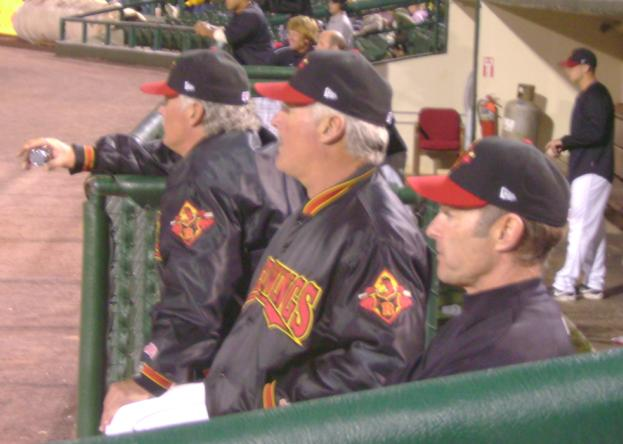
- Cliburn with the Rochester Red Wings in 2008
- Catcher / Manager
- Born: December 19, 1956; Jackson, Mississippi, U.S.
- Died: November 19, 2026 (aged 69)
- Batted: Right Threw: Right

MLB debut
- May 6, 1980, for the California Angels

Last MLB appearance
- September 24, 1980, for the California Angels

MLB statistics
- Batting average: .179
- Home runs: 2
- Runs batted in: 6
- Stats at Baseball Reference

Teams
- California Angels (1980)

Stanley Gene Cliburn (December 19, 1956 – November 19, 2026) was an American professional baseball catcher and manager. He served as the manager of the New Britain Bees and the Rochester Red Wings, the Triple-A affiliates of the Minnesota Twins, from 2006 to 2009. Cliburn also managed in the Arizona Fall League and at other levels in the minor leagues.

== Playing career ==
Cliburn played one season in the majors with the California Angels in 1980 during which he appeared in 54 games at catcher, but he would play in over 948 minor league games during his fourteen-year playing career. He was traded by the Angels to the Atlanta Braves for Joe Redfield on April 2, 1987.

== Coaching career ==
After his playing career ended Cliburn was hired as a manager for the Pittsburgh Pirates' New York-Penn League team, and he spent the next 12 seasons managing in the Pirates system, the Texas Rangers system, and for the Alexandria Aces of the independent Texas-Louisiana League. From 2001 to 2005, Cliburn was the manager of the New Britain Rock Cats, the Double-A affiliate of the Minnesota Twins. His pitching coach at New Britain for those five seasons was his twin brother Stu Cliburn. On October 18, 2005, Stan Cliburn was named as manager of the Rochester Red Wings, the Triple-A affiliate of the Twins. Initially, it was believed that Stu would not be promoted along with Stan; however, both were promoted to Rochester for the 2006 season. In his first season at the helm in Rochester, Cliburn guided the Wings to a 79–64 record and came within one game of winning the Governors' Cup, the championship of the International League.

The 2006 season proved to be the most successful of Cliburn's tenure in Rochester. The team's record declined in each successive season following the playoff run, eventually falling to 70–74 in 2009. Additionally, following the 2008 season, Stan was separated from Stu for the first time in eight years as Stu was reassigned to New Britain for 2009. On September 21, 2009, the Minnesota Twins announced that they would not renew manager Stan Cliburn's contract for the 2010 season. According to Twins farm director Jim Rantz, the change was made as part of an "overall directional change that is being implemented throughout the minor-league system."

After having success managing in the Arizona Fall League Cliburn was hired as the manager for the Sioux City Explorers of the independent American Association of Independent Professional Baseball where he served as manager for three seasons; he was let go by the Explorers following a disappointing season by the team in which they finished 38-62 and Cliburn was cited for a DUI in September 2013.

Cliburn returned to managing in 2015 when he became the manager of the Southern Maryland Blue Crabs of the independent Atlantic League. On December 15, 2015, Cliburn returned to New Britain as the first manager of the new Atlantic League team the New Britain Bees after the departure of the MLB-affiliated Rock Cats.

In 2019, Cliburn returned to serve as the manager for the Southern Maryland Blue Crabs of the Atlantic League of Professional Baseball. On December 9, 2025, Cliburn announced that he would be stepping down as Southern Maryland's manager.

== Personal life ==
Cliburn's twin brother, Stew, also played in the major leagues, and is currently the pitching coach for the Chicago Dogs of the American Association of Professional Baseball. Cliburn died on November 19, 2026, at the age of 69.
