= Pressman (name) =

Pressman is a surname. Notable people with the surname include:

- Ada Irene Pressman, an American mechanical engineer
- Barney Pressman (1894, New York City – 1991), a Jewish-American businessman
- David Pressman (born 1977), a Jewish-American attorney and diplomat
- David Pressman (scientist)
- Edward Rambach Pressman (1943, New York City – 2023), a Jewish-American film producer
- Ellen S. Pressman, an American television director and producer
- Emma Pressman
- Erik Pressman
- Fred Pressman (1923–1996), an American businessman; The son of Barney Pressman
- Gabe Pressman (1924, The Bronx – 2017), a Jewish-American television reporter
- Gene Pressman
- Hyman A. Pressman (1914–1996), a Maryland politician
- Rabbi Jacob Pressman (1919, Philadelphia – 2015), an American conservative rabbi from Los Angeles, California
- Jessica Pressman, American literary scholar
- John Fallon Pressman (1952 – 2009), a Democratic member of the Pennsylvania House of Representatives
- Kevin Paul Pressman (born 1967, Fareham), an English professional football player
- Lawrence Pressman, né David Milton Pressman (born 1939, Cynthiana), a Jewish-American actor
- Lee Pressman, né Leon Pressman (1906, New York City – 1969), an American New Deal government official and self-confessed communist
- Lynn Pressman Raymond (née Rambach), an American business executive
- Michael Pressman, an American film and television producer and director
- Roger S. Pressman, an American technology writer
- Sally Pressman (Bernstein) (born 1981, New York City), a Jewish-American ballet dancer and actress
- Sonia Pressman Fuentes
- Steven Pressman (born 1955, Los Angeles), an American legal journalist
- Steven Pressman (economist) (born 1952, Brooklyn), an American economist
- Thelma Pressman (1921, Rancho Mirage – 2011), an American microwave cooking consultant and cookbook author
- Waldo Pressman Salt
- Yassi Pressman (born 1995), a Filipina-British model, actress, TV personality, singer and dancer

Fictional characters

- Milo Pressman, character on the television series 24

== Pressmann ==
- Élie Pressmann (born 1933, Paris), a French writer, screenwriter and actor
- Martin Pressmann, a photographer
