= Louise Sunshine =

American real estate developer and former civil servant (born 1940)

- Born: Louise Mintz; December 2, 1940 (age 85)
- Known for: founder of the Sunshine Group
- Spouse: Martin S. Begun
- Children: 3
- Family: Barney Pressman (grandfather); Fred Pressman (uncle)
- Website: louisesunshine.com

Louise Mintz Sunshine (born December 2, 1940) is an American real estate developer, and founder of the Sunshine Group.

== Biography ==
Sunshine is the daughter of Elizabeth Pressman and Nelson Mintz, and a granddaughter of Bertha Pressman and Barney Pressman, the founder of Barneys New York. She graduated from Brandeis University and attended New York University where she took business classes in preparation for taking over her father's New Jersey real estate portfolio. She developed an interest in politics and served as the finance Chairwoman of the New York State Democratic Party during Hugh Carey's governorship. She also served as a Democratic National Committeewoman, a member of the state’s Job Development Authority, and Vice Chairman of the State Thruway Authority. During her time in government she met Donald Trump. From 1973–1985, Sunshine was executive vice president of the Trump Organization; she was instrumental in the development of the Grand Hyatt Hotel and Trump Tower, a limited partner of Trump Plaza in New York, and was responsible for the acquisition of the Barbizon Plaza Hotel site in Manhattan and the Mar-a-Lago estate in Palm Beach, Florida. She was also director of sales and marketing for New York's 500 Park Tower and the Palace Hotel Condominium in St. Moritz, Switzerland.

=== The Sunshine Group ===
Sunshine established the Sunshine Group, Ltd. in 1986 with limited partner Jerry Speyer. Under her leadership, the Sunshine Group flourished and was nationally recognized for its outstanding record in predevelopment planning, marketing and sales of premier luxury residential and mixed use developments in major markets throughout the country. The Sunshine Group was the exclusive marketing and sales agent for such properties as Time Warner Center, One Beacon Court, Trump International Hotel and Tower NY, and 40 Bond. By 2000, the company reached over $8 billion in real estate sold. In 2002, she sold the Sunshine Group to NRT LLC, the largest residential real estate brokerage company in the United States. She stayed on with the new company as chairman and CEO for three years and mentored Kelly Kennedy Mack to be the subsidiary's new President. After merging with another NRT subsidiary The Corcoran Group (founded by Barbara Corcoran), the company was officially renamed to the Corcoran Sunshine Marketing Group. Sunshine was named Chairman Emeritus and acted as senior advisor to Corcoran President and CEO Pamela Liebman.

In July 2006, Sunshine joined real estate development company the Alexico Group (founded by Izak Senbahar and Simon Elias) to contribute to the creation of The Mark Hotel, The Laurel, and 56 Leonard. From July 2006 to present, she is President of LMS Consulting, LLC. and is a strategic advisor to Fort Partners in the creation of the record setting developments: The Surf Club Four Seasons Hotel and Private Residences in Miami Beach, Florida; and the Four Seasons Hotel and Private Residences in Fort Lauderdale, Florida.

== Philanthropy ==
Sunshine supports a wide array of charities including Worldwide Orphans, the American Jewish World Service, the American Red Cross, and the University of Miami School Of Architecture. She is the founder of the New York University Judith A. Banham Scholarship Fund.

== Personal life ==
Sunshine has been married twice. During her first marriage she had three children. The marriage ended in divorce in 1980. In 1997, she married her second husband, Martin S. Begun, in New York. Begun, who died in May 2016, served as Associate Dean and Vice President for external affairs at the NYU Langone Medical Center and as President of the Jewish Community Relations Council of New York.

As of 2015, Sunshine resides in Florida.
