= Barneys Warehouse =

American luxury outlet stores

- Industry: Fashion retailer
- Founded: 1970
- Headquarters: New York City
- Area served: California; Florida; Hawaii; Illinois; Massachusetts; New York; Virginia
- Parent: Barneys New York

Barneys Warehouse was an American fashion retailer headquartered in New York City. Barneys Warehouse was owned by Barneys New York and began in 1970 as a semi-annual sale that offered large discounts on designer clothing. Barneys Warehouse had 11 brick and mortar stores and launched an e-commerce website in 2013. Barneys Warehouse offered deals up to 75% off retail prices from luxury designers such as Marni, Derek Lam, Proenza Schouler, Rag & Bone, Chloé, Isabel Marant, John Varvatos, 3.1 Phillip Lim, and Marc by Marc Jacobs. Barneys Warehouse closed following the 2019 bankruptcy of Barneys New York.

== The First Barneys Warehouse Sale ==
In August 1970, the idea for the first Barneys Warehouse Sale was born. To generate both extra revenue and advertising, as well as to move through inventory, Barneys would host a clearance event in the 17,000-square-foot (1,600-square-meter) first floor of the warehouse building in Chelsea. The first sale ran from September 8, 1970 to September 12, 1970. The advertising for the first Barneys Warehouse Sale put a focus on the need to sell the past season's inventory. This was to excite customers about the new merchandise that would eventually take the old inventory's place. Advertisements also promoted that only certain quantities were available for specific designers. On September 8, the first day of the Barneys Warehouse Sale, a full-page advertisement with the headline "Don't Go to Work Today" ran in both The New York Times and The New York Daily News. There were many radio advertisements throughout the course of the sale, and these changed by the day to portray a sense of urgency to the potential customers. The first Barneys Warehouse Sale sold over 30,000 units of designer clothing, served approximately 20,000 customers, and generated $1,108,500 in sales.

== The Transition ==
In September 1971, the Barneys Second Annual Warehouse Sale was held. To promote the second sale, advertisements portrayed the great designer deals that customers were able to receive at the first sale. In 1995, the first Barneys New York Outlet opened. The semi-annual Barneys Warehouse Sale was held for 42 consecutive years at the Chelsea warehouse location. The Barneys Warehouse Sale expanded to other markets such as Chicago and Los Angeles. BarneysWarehouse.com was launched in 2013 so customers could access deep designer discounts online. The final Barneys Warehouse Sale was in 2014.

== Stores ==
The first Barneys New York Outlet opened in 1995. In 2014, the store locations were renamed Barneys New York Warehouse to reflect the heritage of the Barneys Warehouse Sales that were held in Manhattan. There are 11 Barneys New York Warehouse locations. The stores are located at high-traffic outlet centers such as Woodbury Common Premium Outlets and Tanger Outlets.

California

- Cabazon - Desert Hills Premium Outlets (opened 1995)
- Camarillo - Camarillo Premium Outlets (opened 1995)
- Carlsbad - Carlsbad Premium Outlets (opened 1997)
- Livermore - San Francisco Premium Outlets (opened 2012)

Florida

- Sunrise - Sawgrass Mills (opened 2006)
- Orlando - Orlando Vineland Premium Outlets

Hawaii

- Waipahu - Waikele Premium Outlets (opened 1997)

Illinois

- Rosemont - Fashion Outlets of Chicago (opened 2013)

Massachusetts

- Wrentham - Wrentham Village Premium Outlets (opened 1997)

New York

- Central Valley - Woodbury Commons Premium Outlets (opened 1996)
- Riverhead - Tanger Outlets (opened 1997)

Virginia

- Leesburg - Leesburg Corner Premium Outlets (opened 2001)

== E-Commerce ==
With the launch of BarneysWarehouse.com in February 2013, customers no longer have to wait in line to access the designer discounts that the semi-annual Barneys Warehouse Sale offered. BarneysWarehouse.com offers international shipping to over 100 countries. The retailer has a presence on Facebook, Twitter, and Pinterest. The Barneys Warehouse Facebook Page has over 128,000 likes.
