= Loehmann's =

American department store chain

Loehmann's Holdings, Inc.
- Type: Private
- Industry: Retail
- Founded: 1921
- Founder: Frieda Loehmann; Charles C. Loehmann
- Defunct: 2014 (brick and mortar); 2018 (online retail)
- Fate: Liquidation, online revival and then physical revival as a pop-up
- Headquarters: New York City, United States
- Parent: Century 21
- Website: shoploehmanns.com

Loehmann's is an American department store that started in 1921 in New York City, growing to a chain of off-price department stores in the United States.

The chain is best known for its "Back Room", featuring off-price designer goods. In 2014 the chain closed all stores, and became an online retailer before ceasing operations in 2018. Loehmann's was purchased in 2020 by Century 21 department stores and will return in 2026 with pop-up locations.

== History and operations ==
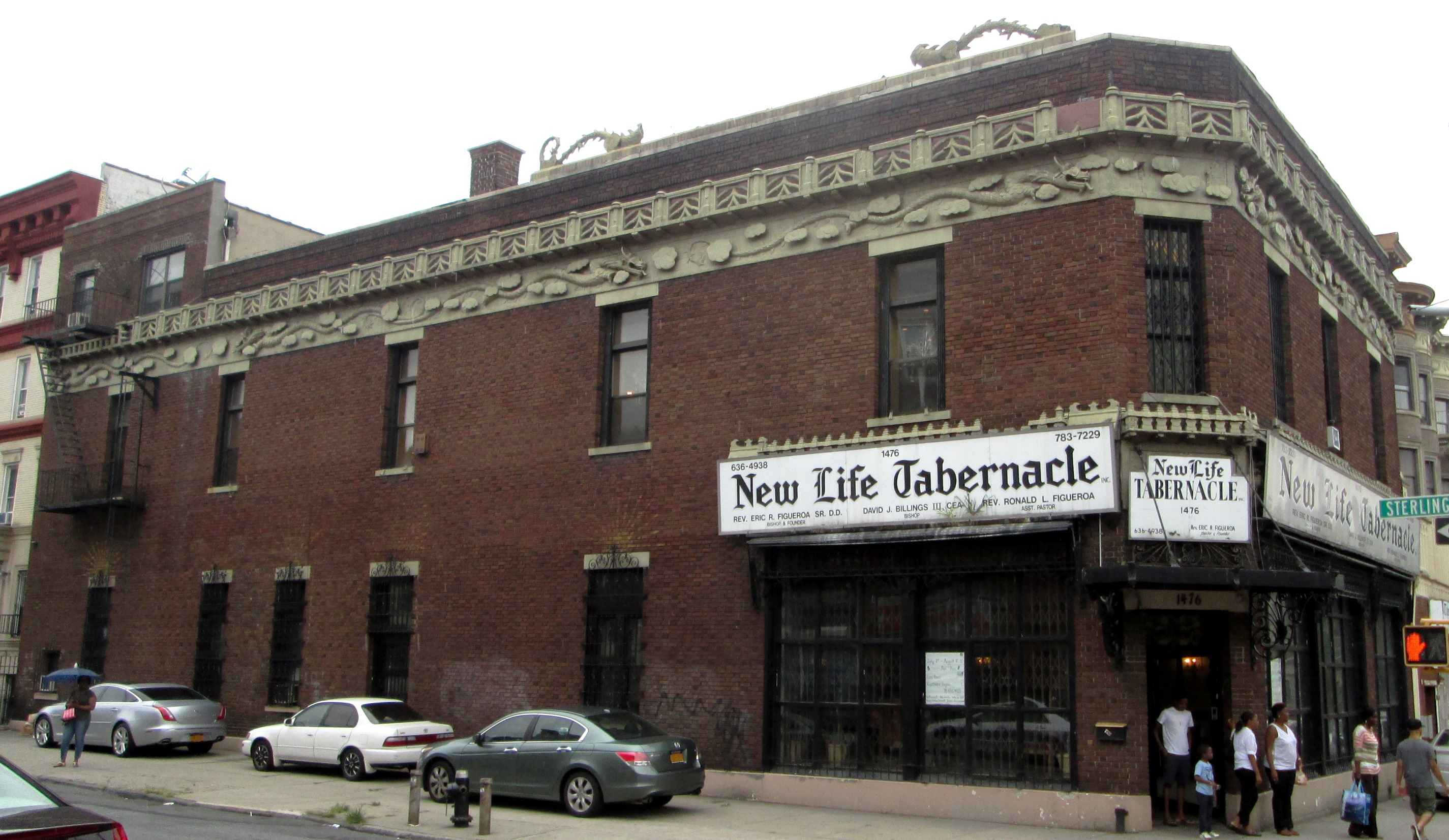
Frieda Loehmann's original store was located in this building at 1476 Bedford Avenue in the Crown Heights neighborhood of Brooklyn, New York City. It is now a gospel church.

In 1921, Frieda Loehmann, a former department store buyer, and her son Charles, opened the first Loehmann's store. The store was located in a former automobile showroom on the northwest corner of Bedford Avenue and Sterling Place in Brooklyn, New York City.

They purchased seasonal overstocks from top New York designers and sold them at bargain prices.

Frieda refused to expand into additional stores, but her son opened a second store, also called Loehmann's, on Fordham Road in the Bronx in 1930, using the same sales strategy. Frieda continued to run the original store, buying the building and moving into living quarters above it.

Soon after her death in 1962, the Bedford Avenue store was closed, and the Charles C. Loehmann company went public and began to expand to a wider area.

Loehmann's was acquired by Associated Dry Goods in 1983. In 1986, The May Department Stores Company merged with Associated Dry Goods. Two years later, May Department Stores Company sold the 77-unit chain to an investor group led by a Spanish concern, Sefinco Ltd., and the Sprout Group, a division of Donaldson, Lufkin & Jenrette.

The company was taken public again in May 1996.

At its peak in 1999, the company had approximately 100 stores in 17 states.

=== Multiple bankruptcies ===
In May 1999, Loehmann's declared Chapter 11 bankruptcy. It emerged from bankruptcy protection on September 6, 2000. In 2004, it was acquired for $177 million (~$289 million in 2025) by Arcapita (formerly Crescent Capital), a private investment firm complying with Islamic Banking law. In May 2006, Arcapita sold Loehmann's for $300 million (~$460 million in 2025) to Istithmar, a private equity firm based in Dubai.

On November 15, 2010, Loehmann's filed for Chapter 11 again, after failing to reach a debt extension with its creditors. It then announced the closing of eight stores.

By the end of February 2011, Loehmann's emerged from bankruptcy protection. New York-based Loehmann's said it secured $45 million in financing while saying its restructuring eliminated $110 million in long-term bond debt, $14 million in interests and included $23 million in other cost reductions.

On December 16, 2013, Loehmann's filed for Chapter 11 bankruptcy for the third time, listing assets at $100 million, with debt at $500 million. During bankruptcy, Esopus Creek Value Series Fund LP purchased Loehmann’s intellectual property assets and customer lists starting in March 2014 and Tiger Capital Group, A&G Realty Partners, and SB Capital Group purchased the inventory, furniture and fixtures, accounts receivable, and cash component. In 2017, after Loehmann's Manhattan lease expired, Barneys New York opened its downtown store at the Loehmann’s site at Seventh Avenue and 16th Street in Chelsea. It is the same building where Barney Pressman started his discount men’s business in 1923. Loehmann's began its final going-out-of-business sale at all stores on January 8, 2014, and continued to close its stores, and consolidate its remaining merchandise at its remaining stores during the liquidation process until the remaining stock had been cleared by the liquidator. Loehmann's closed its last store on February 26, 2014, and moved into online-only retailing from that date.

=== Return ===
In 2025 the New York Post reported that Loehmann's had been purchased by Century 21, with pop-up off-price goods first in Deer Park, then in Florida and New York City.
