= Pressman =

Pressman can refer to:

- Pressman (name)
- Pressman Toy Corporation
- The operator of a printing press or machine press
- An employee of a newspaper (British usage)
- A line of Sony portable tape recorders launched in 1977, from which the original Walkman was developed
