= Master of Professional Studies =

Type of master's degree concentrated in an applied field of study

A Master of Professional Studies (MPS) is a type of master's degree concentrated in an applied field of study. MPS degrees are often interdisciplinary. While Master of Arts and Master of Science degree programs tend to focus on theory and research, Master of Professional Studies degrees tend to emphasize practical skills designed for current and aspiring professionals, including post-bachelor and post-graduate students, and often require some amount of fieldwork or internship to complement classroom learning.

Admission to the MPS program typically requires documentation of professional experience and competencies, in addition to an earned undergraduate degree or postgraduate education and satisfactory standardized test scores such as the Graduate Record Examination.

== Examples ==
A number of universities in the United States offer MPS degrees in a variety of fields:

- The City College of New York offers a Master of Professional Studies in Branding + Integrated Communications (BIC)
- Cornell University Master of Professional Studies is offered in Information Science in the Department of Information Science, in Applied Statistics in the Department of Statistical Science, in the College of Agriculture and Life Sciences, in Real Estate through the Baker Program in Real Estate Human Resource Management from the College of Industrial and Labor Relations and in Veterinary Parasitology at the College of Veterinary Medicine.
- East Tennessee State University School of Continuing Studies and Academic Outreach offers Master of Professional Studies degrees in Strategic Leadership and Training & Development.
- Five Towns College offers a Master of Professional Studies (MPS) in Sound Recording Technology.
- Fort Hays State University offers Master of Professional Studies degrees in several fields, including Human Resource Management, Information Assurance Management, Cybersecurity, Web Development, Computer Networking, Public Health Administration, Political Management, Social Entrepreneurship, Instructional Design, Chemistry, Music Composition, Music Performance, Organizational Leadership, Criminal Justice, and Gerontology. Many of these programs are available for online completion.
- George Mason University offers a Master of Professional Studies (MPS) in Applied Industrial-Organizational (I-O) Psychology.
- George Washington University College of Professional Studies offers Masters of Professional Studies in 12 fields of study; including Political Management and Legislative Affairs through its Graduate School of Political Management.
- Georgetown University School of Continuing Studies offers Master of Professional Studies degrees in Applied Intelligence, Artificial Intelligence Management, Cybersecurity Risk Management, Design Management & Communications, Emergency & Disaster Management, Higher Education Administration, Human Resources Management, Information Technology Management, Integrated Marketing Communications, Journalism, Project Management, Strategic Communications, Real Estate, Sports Industry Management, Supply Chain Management, and Urban & Regional Planning. Georgetown also offers an Executive Master of Professional Studies degree in Global Sports Operations & Strategy.
- LIM College offers MPS degree programs in Fashion Merchandising & Retail Management, Fashion Marketing, Visual Merchandising, and Global Fashion Supply Chain Management.
- The New York School of Interior Design offers MPS degrees in Sustainable Interior Environments, Lighting Design and Healthcare Interior Design
- New York University offers a terminal MPS degree through the Tisch School of the Arts: Interactive Telecommunications Program (ITP).
- Northeastern University College of Professional Studies offers a Master of Professional Studies in Digital Media, Informatics and Masters of Professional studies in Analytics.
- The University of Connecticut Center for Continuing Studies offers Master of Professional Studies degrees in Homeland Security Leadership (HSL), Human Resource Management (HRM), and Humanitarian Services Administration (HSA).
- Pennsylvania State University Smeal College of Business offers a Master of Professional Studies in Supply Chain Management.
- Penn State Harrisburg School of Science, Engineering, and Technology offers a Master of Professional Studies in Engineering Management.
- Penn State University World Campus (distance education) offers MPS degrees in Community, Economic Development, Homeland Security and Organization Development and Change.
- Pratt Institute offers a Master of Professional Studies in Design Management.
- RIT offers Master of Science in Professional Studies, where two to three concentration areas out of the other RIT graduate courses may be combined in individual MS program.
- The School of Visual Arts offers a Master of Professional Studies in Branding and Art Therapy.
- St. John's University College of Professional Studies offers a Master of Professional Studies in Sport Management and Criminal Justice Leadership.
- SUNY Environmental Science and Forestry's Department of Environment Studies offers a Master of Professional Studies in Environmental Studies.
- The State University of New York at New Paltz Graduate School offers a Master of Professional Studies in Humanistic/Multicultural Education.
- State University of New York at Stony Brook School of Professional Development offers a Master of Professional Studies in Human Resource Management.
- Tennessee State University College of Public Service & Urban Affairs: Professional Studies, Public Administration offers Master of Professional Studies degrees in Strategic leadership, Human Resource Leadership and Training and development.
- Tulane University School of Professional Advancement offers a Master of Professional Studies in Applied Computing Systems & Technology.
- Tulane University School of Professional Advancement offers a Master of Professional Studies in Homeland Security Leadership.
- The University of Auckland, New Zealand offers a Master of Professional Studies in International Relations and Human Rights, and Translation.
- The University of Bridgeport Shintaro Akatsu School of Design offers a Master of Professional Studies in Design Management.
- The University of Maryland, College Park
  - UMD offers a Master's of Professional Studies in Industrial/ Organizational Psychology. The UMD IO Psychology Master's program is designed to provide students with a comprehensive understanding of the field of Industrial/ Organizational Psychology, as well as how IO practice can be augmented by a strong understanding of statistics and business. The IO MPS program provides high levels of rigorous academic training, hands-on practical experiences, and mentoring while meeting the needs of students and working professionals.
  - The University of Maryland, College Park now offers a Master of Professional Studies in Clinical Psychological Science.
  - The UMD College of Behavioral and Social Sciences offers Master of Professional Studies in Applied Economics and Master of Professional Studies in Geospatial Information Sciences.
  - The UMD Colleges of Arts and Sciences, School of Languages, Literatures, and Cultures; formerly offers a Master of Professional Studies in Arabic, but discontinued their program following cuts in federal funding.
- The University of Memphis University College offers a Master of Professional Studies in Human Resources Leadership; Strategic Leadership; and Training and Development.
- The University of Minnesota College of Continuing Education offers a Master of Professional Studies in Arts and Cultural Leadership.
- The University of North Alabama Office of Professional and Interdisciplinary Studies offers a Master of Professional Studies in Community Development; Security and Safety Leadership; and Information Technology.
- Utica College in New York offers a Master of Professional Studies in Cyber Policy and Risk Analysis.
- West Liberty University Master in Professional Studies programs include Areas of Emphasis (AoE), such as Organizational Leadership (OL) and Justice Leadership (JL) that focus on various for-profit and non-profit professional fields.

== Former ==
- The New York Theological Seminary offered a Master of Professional Studies at Sing Sing Prison.
