= David Biro =

American writer and physician

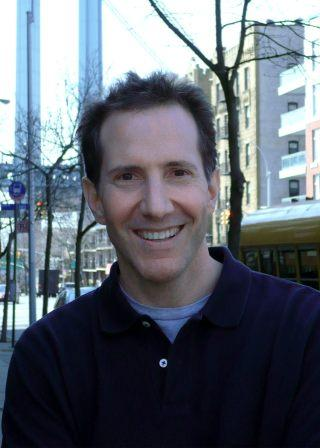
- Born: 1964 (age 61–62); New York City, U.S.
- Education: University of Pennsylvania (BA); Columbia University (MD); Oxford University (DPhil)
- Occupations: Writer, physician
- Writing career
- Period: 2001 to present
- Website: www.davidbiro.com

David Eric Biro (born 1964) is an American writer and physician.

== Education and academic career ==
Biro was born in 1964, and grew up in Brooklyn, New York, where he attended Poly Prep with his three sisters. He received a BA in Classics from University of Pennsylvania. He went on to receive an MD from Columbia University in 1991, and a DPhil in English Literature in 1993 from the University of Oxford.

Biro is an associate clinical professor of Dermatology and Medical Humanities at SUNY Downstate in Brooklyn, and a clinical assistant professor of Dermatology at the NYU Grossman School of Medicine. He teaches general dermatology with a focus on skin cancer.

In the medical humanities, Biro's main areas of expertise are the expressibility of pain, the psychological dimensions of pain, illness narratives, and the patient experience.

== Writing ==
In 1996, Biro discovered that he had a rare bone marrow disease, paroxysmal nocturnal hemoglobinuria. He was treated by a bone marrow transplant from one of his sisters. He wrote in 2000 about his experience as a patient, and how it changed his work as a physician, in his first book One Hundred Days: My Unexpected Journey from Doctor to Patient. He also drew on this experience in his second book, The Language of Pain: Finding Words, Compassion, Relief, which discusses the use of language to express pain.

His first work of fiction, The Magnificent Dappled Sea, was published in 2020. This was followed by a second novel in 2021.

== Personal life ==
Biro married fashion executive Daniella Vitale in 1991.. The couple live in Manhattan with their sons.

== Bibliography ==
=== Books ===
- Biro, David (2000). One Hundred Days: My Unexpected Journey from Doctor to Patient. Pantheon. ISBN 0-375-40715-4.
- Biro, David (2010). The Language of Pain: Finding Words, Compassion, and Relief. W.W. Norton. ISBN 978-0-393-07063-7.
- Biro, David (2020). The Magnificent Dappled Sea. Lake Union. ISBN 978-1542019811.
- Biro, David (2021). And the Bridge is Love. Lake Union. ISBN 978-1-5420-2722-9.
