= Rosemont Theatre =

Concert hall in Rosemont, Illinois, U.S.

Coordinates: 41°58′34.39″N 87°51′51.34″W

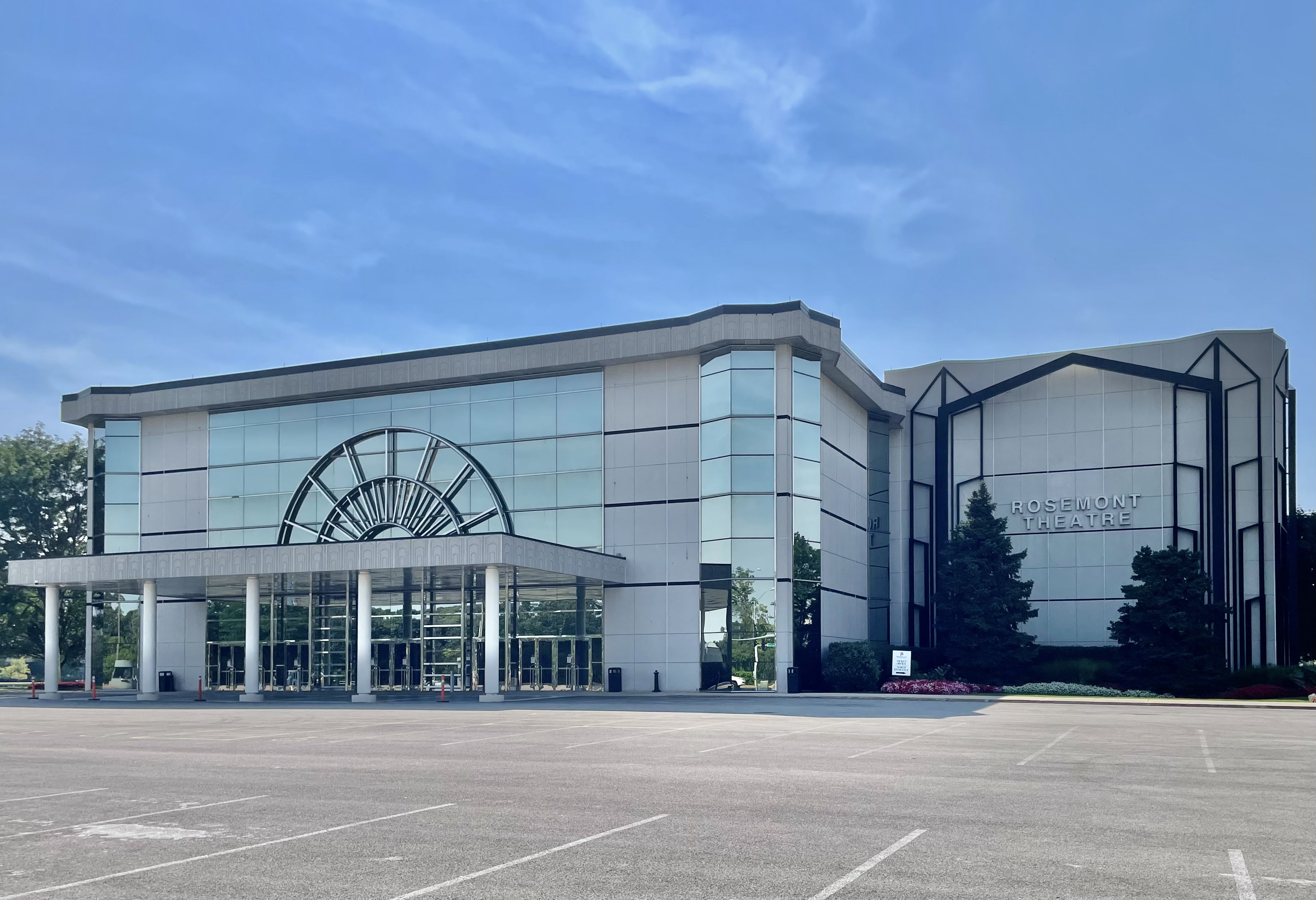
- Exterior of theatre
- Interactive map of Rosemont Theatre
- Former names: Rosemont Theatre (1995–2012); Akoo Theatre at Rosemont (2012–13)
- Address: 5400 North River Road; Rosemont, IL 60018
- Location: Chicago metropolitan area
- Owner: Village of Rosemont
- Capacity: 4,400
- Type: concert hall

Construction
- Opened: 1995

Website
- www.rosemont.com/theatre/

The Rosemont Theatre is a concert hall in Rosemont, Illinois, a suburb of Chicago. The venue, which has seats for 4,400 people, opened in 1995 and hosts many different musical artists and shows. It is located near O'Hare International Airport, Fashion Outlets of Chicago, Allstate Arena and Donald E. Stephens Convention Center.

== About ==
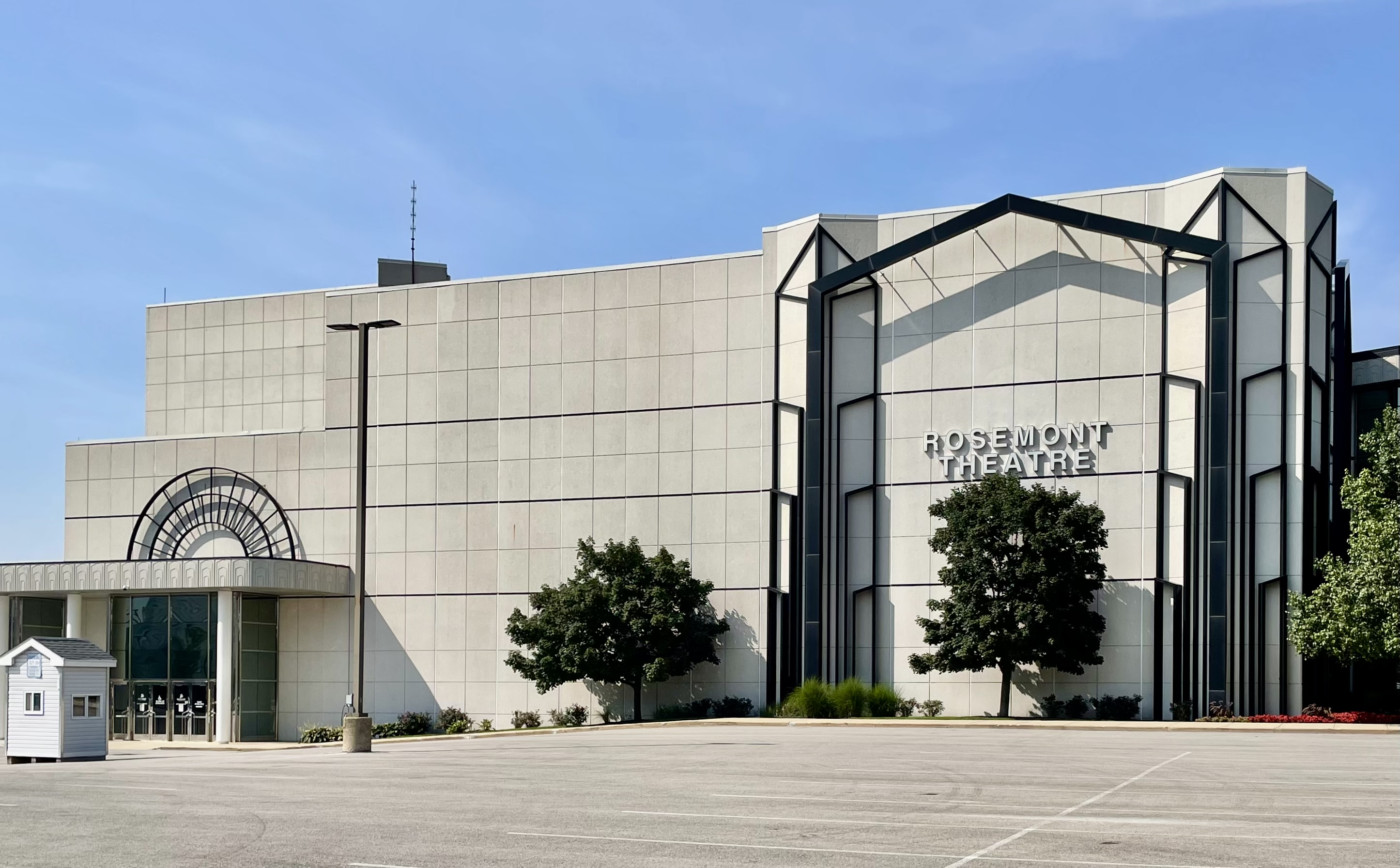
Side view of the building

The Mayor of Rosemont, Bradley Stephens, is currently planning to sell the site to the state of Illinois to use as a casino in an effort to gain revenue. The idea was initially pitched in September 2007 and again in May 2008, to lawmakers in Springfield who have expressed interest in the state-owned casino as they are still seeking ways to support a $31 million public works program advanced by former Governor Rod Blagojevich. In 2012, Akoo International, Inc. purchased five-year naming rights for $1.5 million. The company specializes in making interactive media for college dorms, malls and shopping centers. Along with naming rights, the company also create visual content for artists performing at the theatre and the Allstate Arena. Akoo International went out of business in January 2013 and the venue returned to its former name beginning March 2013.

The theatre was planned to be demolished and moved for an upcoming expansion for the adjacent Fashion Outlets of Chicago following an approval from the village of Rosemont to do so in May 2018. This never came to fruition after the expansion was called off in 2020, and Rosemont Theatre was not demolished.

== Events ==
Scorpions concluded the US leg of their Get Your Sting and Blackout World Tour here on August 21, 2010, with surprise guest appearances by former guitarist of Scorpions and UFO, Michael Schenker, younger brother of Scorpions guitarist Rudolf Schenker, during "Another Piece of Meat" and Carmine Appice, during "No One Like You". The answer-and-question game show Jeopardy! held their annual College Championship there in May 1999. Oasis played the venue in 1998, 2005, and 2008.

In 2001, Barney's 4th live show "Barney's Musical Castle" was taped at this place. It was the venue for the annual WWE Hall of Fame induction ceremony on April 1, 2006.

Various K-pop artists — including 2PM, BTS, Exo, TXT, Itzy, (G)I-dle, Aespa and STAYC — have performed at the venue.

On June 6, 2025, Philippine pop group BINI performed in the arena as part of the Biniverse World Tour 2025.

Preceded by Zellerbach Hall; University of California, Berkeley	Host site, Jeopardy! College Championship; 1999	Succeeded by Sony Pictures Studios
