= LIM College =

Private for-profit fashion college in New York City

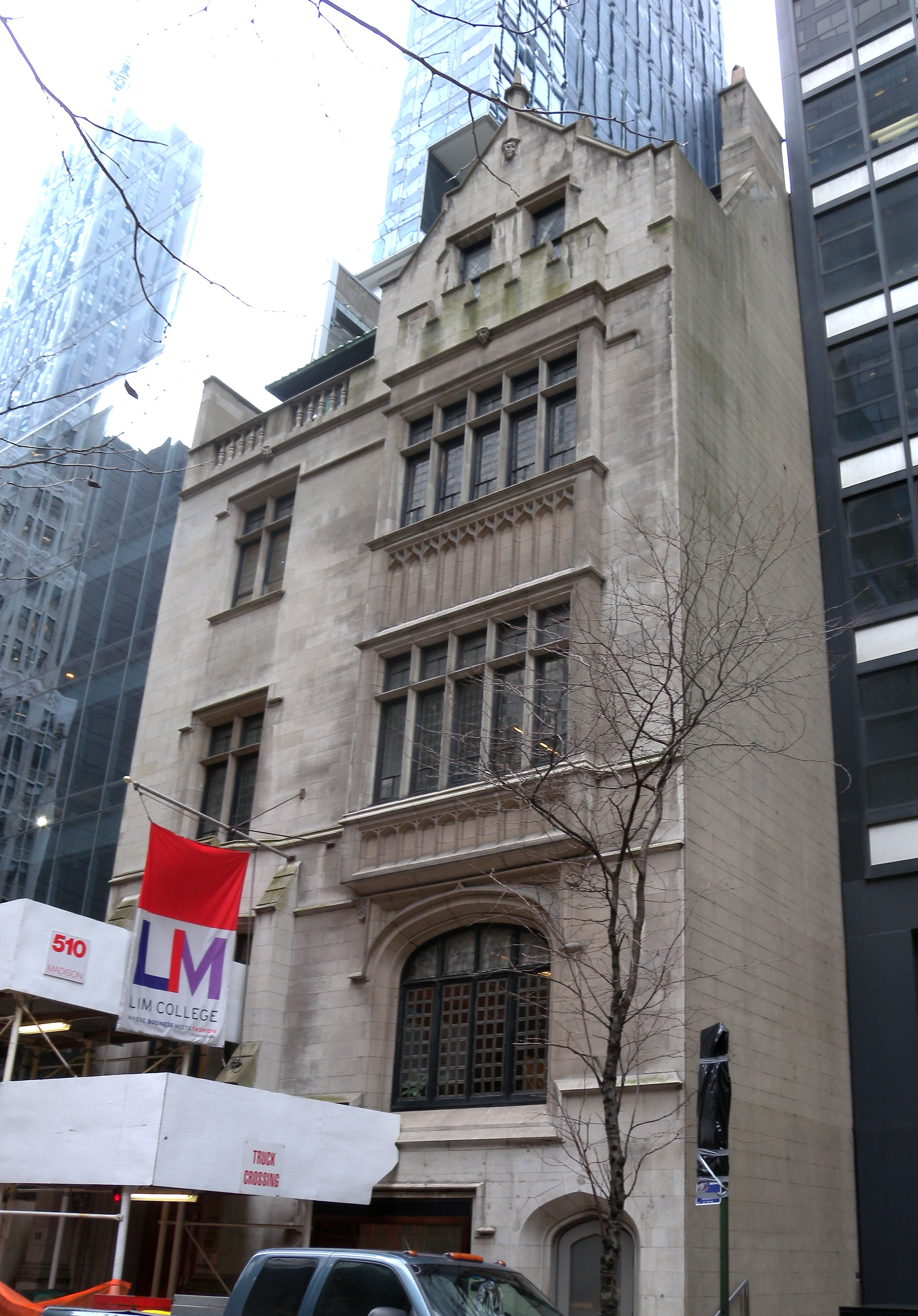
- Motto: The Business of Fashion & Lifestyle
- Type: Private for-profit college
- Established: 1939
- President: Ron Marshall
- Faculty: 14 FT/ 153 PT (2023)
- Students: 1,371 (2023)
- Undergraduates: 1,142 (2023)
- Postgraduates: 229 (2023)
- Location: Manhattan, New York City, New York, United States
- Campus: Urban

LIM College is a private for-profit college in Midtown Manhattan focused on the business of fashion and lifestyle. LIM College offers master's, bachelor's, and associate degree programs in fashion-focused majors with an emphasis on the connection between real-world experience and academic study.

== History ==
LIM College was founded in 1939 by retail and education expert Maxwell F. Marcuse as the Laboratory Institute of Merchandising, at the request of retailers who wanted a school that would teach women about the fashion business and merchandising. LIM became co-ed in 1971 and Maxwell's son, Adrian G. Marcuse, became president in 1972. During his tenure, LIM College became accredited by the Middle States Commission on Higher Education and earned authority from New York State to grant bachelor's degrees. Former fashion executive Elizabeth S. Marcuse assumed the presidency in 2002. In 2009, the school changed its name to LIM College. President Elizabeth S. Marcuse stepped down from her role on Dec. 31, 2023. The role of president at LIM College has been assumed by Ron Marshall. Most recently, President Ron Marshall assumed leadership of LIM College in January 2024, following his tenure on the Board of Directors and as a strategic consultant since 2019. With extensive experience in retail, Marshall previously held executive roles at Nash-Finch Company, Borders Group, Inc., Great Atlantic & Pacific Tea Company, and Claire’s Stores Inc.

== Academics ==
LIM College offers undergraduate majors leading to a bachelor's degree in Fashion Media, Fashion Management & Leadership, Fashion Merchandising, Visual Studies, Marketing and The Business of Cannabis. Minors are available in several fields, including, but not limited to, Sustainability, English, Fashion Design for Business, Digital Design and Photography, Entrepreneurship, and Interior and Residential Concepts. Associate degree programs are also offered.

At the graduate level, LIM offers Master of Professional Studies (MPS) degree programs in Fashion Merchandising & Retail Management, Fashion Marketing, the Business of Fashion, and the Business of Cannabis. As well as Master of Science (MS) degree programs in Consumer Analytics and Global Fashion Supply Chain Management. Many of LIM College's degree programs are also offered in a fully online format. Summer programs for high school students and a summer immersion program for international students are available as well.

Experiential education, or "learn by doing", is the foundation of LIM's educational approach. Undergraduate students must complete three internships, including one in a retail environment, one at the retail managerial level or in a corporate setting, and during senior year, students must complete a nearly full-time internship related to their specific career goals. Many students volunteer at events such as New York Fashion Week, and participate in industry-sponsored competitions, and fashion professionals regularly visit campus to share their insights with students. There are many clubs that students may join that provide experience to students such as Fashion Production club, styling club and the school magazine The Lexington Line.

=== Accreditation ===
LIM College is accredited by the Middle States Commission on Higher Education and its BBA, BPS, and associate degree programs are accredited by the Accreditation Council for Business Schools and Programs. Also, LIM College is cited as one of The Best Fashion Schools in the World 2019 in the BoF's (The Business of Fashion) global assessment of fashion education. BoF is a leading digital authority on the global fashion industry.

== Enrollment ==
In 2020, LIM College had a total undergraduate enrollment of 1,503, with a gender distribution of 11 percent male students and 89 percent female students. Approximately one quarter of the students live in college-owned, -operated or -affiliated housing. The on-campus undergraduate student-to-faculty ratio was 9 to 1 and the average undergraduate class size was 17. There were also 278 students enrolled in the LIM College's graduate programs (170 on-campus/108 online).

== Campus ==
The campus consists of two buildings in Midtown Manhattan, located in walking distance of each other. Student housing is offered at FOUND Study's Midtown East location on Lexington Avenue.

- Fifth Avenue building, at 545 Fifth Avenue – 40.755305°N 73.979365°W
- Maxwell Hall, at 216 East 45th Street – 40.752185°N 73.97214°W
- FOUND Study Midtown East, at 569 Lexington Avenue – 40.757062728179356°N 73.97188605223425°W

Until 2024, LIM also had a building at 12 East 53rd Street.

== External recognition ==
In 2019, The Business of Fashion named LIM College as one of "The Best Fashion Schools in the World". LIM was named to Phi Theta Kappa's Transfer Honor Roll every year since 2016. The Princeton Review included LIM College on its list of "Best Northeastern Colleges" for 2024.

== Alumni ==
Notable LIM College alumni include:

- Zerina Akers, stylist for Beyoncé
- Daniella Vitale, chief executive officer, Salvatore Ferragamo NA
