= Frieda Loehmann =

Frieda Loehmann (1873–1962) was an American businesswoman who founded the off-price department store chain Loehmann's.

Frieda Mueller was born in October 1873. When she was young, her family moved from Hoboken, New Jersey to Cincinnati, Ohio. She met flautist Charles Loehmann at the age of 19 and the pair married in the early 1890s. After his flute-playing career ended due to lip paralysis, he opened a haberdashery and Frieda had her first experience merchandising. The business did well at first, but went into bankruptcy following a move. In 1916, Frieda took a buying job in New York and the family moved to Brooklyn. She got the idea to sell samples and surplus apparel at discount prices and in 1920 started the first Loehmann's store in their Brooklyn home.

Loehmann purchased odd lots, samples, and overstock from fashion houses on Seventh Avenue. The business eventually earned $3 million per year.

Loehmann had three children, Charles, Marjorie, and William.
