= They All Came to Barneys =

2025 memoir by Gene Pressman

They All Came to Barneys: Personal History of the World's Greatest Store
- Author: Gene Pressman
- Language: English
- Subject: Barney Pressman
- Genre: Memoir
- Publisher: Viking Press
- Publication date: September 2, 2025
- Pages: 400

They All Came to Barneys: Personal History of the World's Greatest Store is a 2025 memoir by Gene Pressman, about his grandfather Barney Pressman and his store, Barneys New York. Published September 2, 2025, by Viking Press, Gene, who worked at Barneys throughout his life, covers the history and fall of the Barneys store, with the final chapter, "The Barneys Diaspora", being acknowledgements. Gene had also previously written Chasing Cool.

== Reception ==
Shane O'Neill of The Washington Post wrote "he doesn't really care what any of his critics might think of him. That's part of what makes this book so fun to read". A Publishers Weekly reviewer wrote "despite some vivid glimpses inside the New York City fashion world, the narrative loses its luster as the author's defensiveness takes over". Writing for The New Yorker, Adrienne Raphel said "the experience of reading They All Came to Barneys is much like that of flipping through a scrapbook with Pressman by your side, mouthing along to his favorite stories".

== Planned adaptation ==
There is a planned television adaptation of They All Came to Barneys, which is to be directed by Joe Wright, written by Beth Schacter, and produced by Amazon MGM Studios. Alongside others, Stacey Sher will be the executive producer.
