= Daniella Vitale =

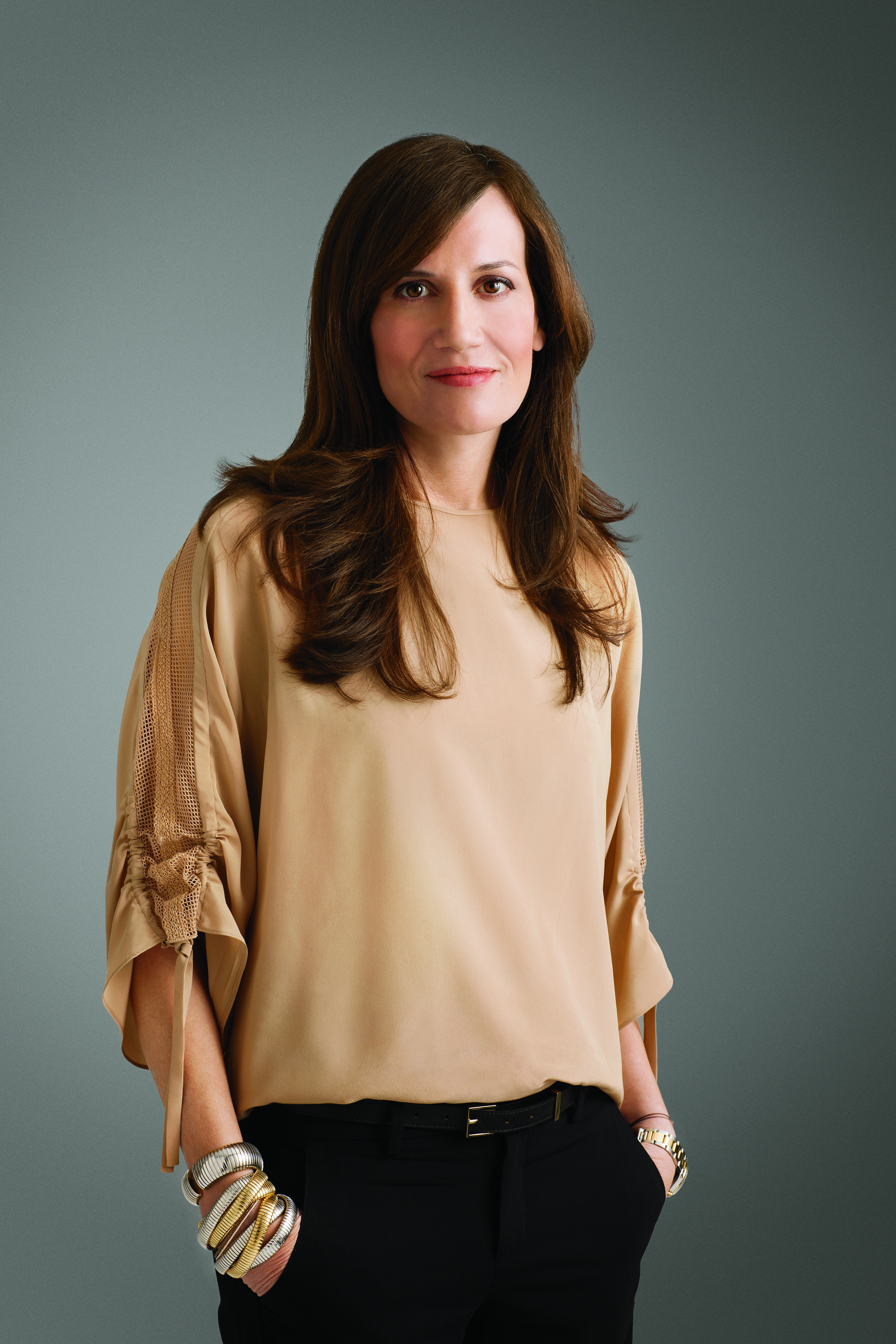
Daniella Vitale, former CEO of Barneys New York

Daniella Vitale is the Chief Executive Officer (Americas) of Salvatore Ferragamo. Prior to that, she held the role of Chief brand officer at Tiffany & Co. between November 2019 and October 2021. She was the chief executive officer and president of Barneys New York until its closure in 2019.

== Career ==
Vitale moved to New York to study at the Laboratory Institute of Merchandising, followed by the Fashion Institute of Technology. She began her career at Salvatore Ferragamo in the luxury sector as a merchandise manager before joining Giorgio Armani in 1994 as vice president of wholesale. In 1999, Vitale joined Gucci in a similar capacity and became president and CEO of Gucci America in 2006.

In December 2010, Vitale began her career at Barneys as chief merchant overseeing women's merchandising. She is credited for the e-commerce division's tenfold growth.

In 2012, she became chief operating officer where she managed the company's e-commerce, e-business strategy and women's merchandising. In February 2017, she became Chief Executive Officer, succeeding Mark Lee.

As CEO, she led an overhaul of the company's physical store network, investing $200 million in retail spaces, including a 58,000 Chelsea neighborhood storefront. She has also been named to the Business of Fashion 500 List. She and Mark Lee radically changed Barneys under their leadership which ultimately led the company to close in 2019.

== Achievements ==
Vitale has received multiple awards for her charitable contributions. These include honors such as the Champion of Children award from LIFT, Women Who Get it Right from NBCC (National Breast Cancer Coalition) and the Honorary Award for her philanthropic work from UJA Federation. In 2016, Daniella Vitale successfully launched the Barneys New York Foundation with the objective to raise further awareness for the companys' philanthropic efforts. She now holds a seat on the UNICEF New York Board and on The Baker Retailing Center Industry Advisory Board at Wharton School of the University of Pennsylvania, amongst other organizations.

== Personal life ==
Vitale lives in Manhattan with her husband David Biro and sons.
