= Fred Pressman =

Chairman of Barneys New York

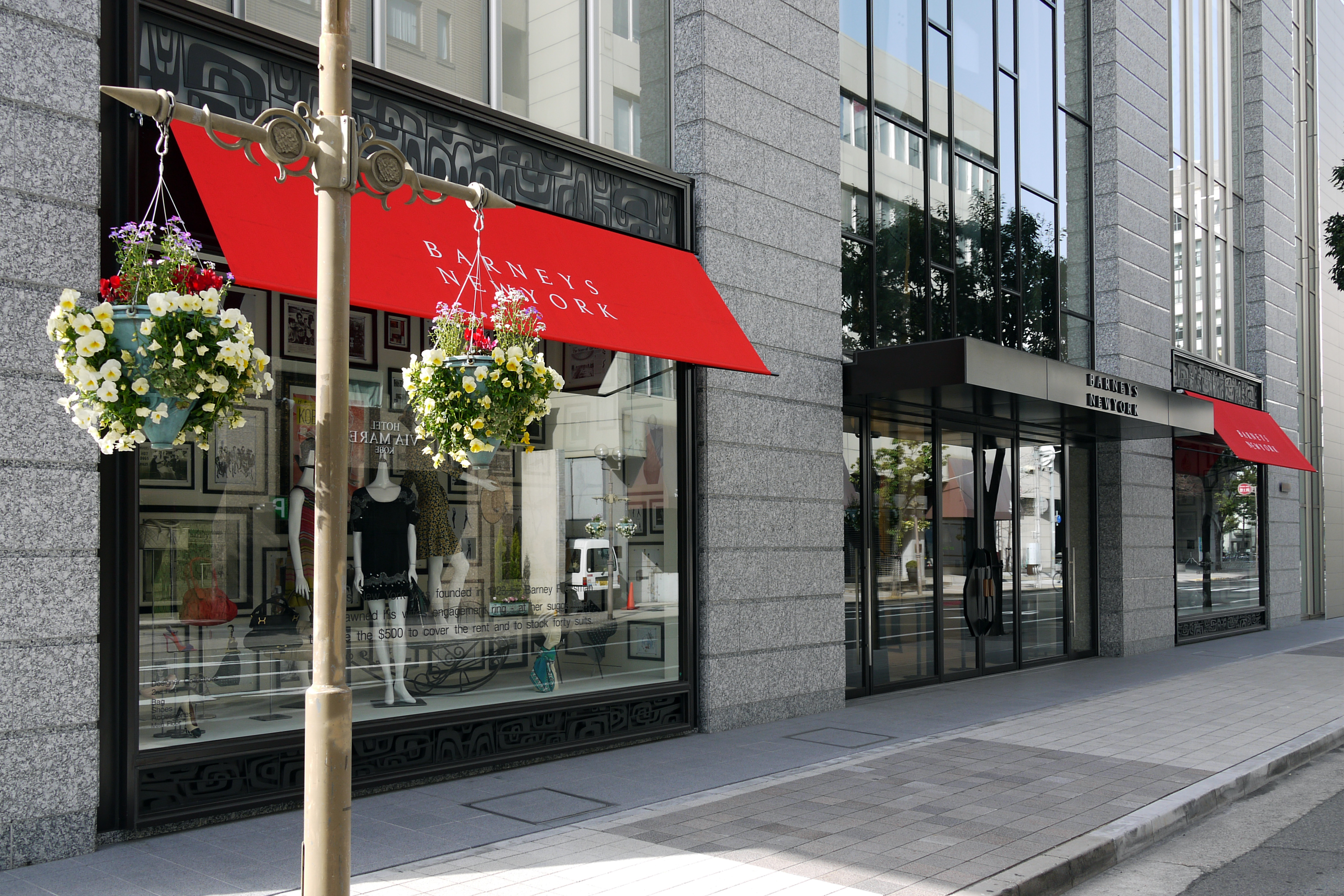
- Barney's New York
- Born: 1923
- Died: July 14, 1996 (age 73)
- Education: B.A. Rutgers University
- Occupation: Retail executive
- Known for: Chairman of Barneys New York
- Spouse: Phyllis Pressman
- Children: 4
- Parent(s): Bertha and Barney Pressman
- Family: Louise Sunshine (niece)

Fred Pressman (1923 – July 14, 1996) was the chairman of Barneys New York. He assumed the role after taking over from his father, Barney Pressman. Under Fred Pressman's leadership, the store changed from being a discount men's suit shop to a luxury department store showcasing designer fashion.

== Early life and education ==
Pressman was born in New York City, the son of Barbara and Barney Pressman. His father founded Barneys, a clothing store that focused on selling name brand suits at a deep discount to the working class by purchasing inventory at auctions, bankruptcies, and in odd lots. He attended Rutgers University before enlisting in the US Army. In 1946, he joined the family business where he excelled at finding quality goods that he could purchase for a discount and sell using innovative marketing.

== Career ==
In the late 1950s, Pressman became chairman of the company. He slowly transitioned it from a discount retailer, instead selling clothing from top-name designers from Europe who were relatively unknown in the United States. He also added women's clothing, housewares, cosmetics, and gifts. He was credited with introducing Giorgio Armani to the American market in 1976 as well as one of the first American retailers to sell Hubert de Givenchy and Pierre Cardin products.

In the 1970s, his two sons, Gene and Bob, joined the business. In the late 1980s, Barneys entered into a partnership with the Japanese retailer Isetan to expand the Barneys name internationally. In January 1996, Barneys filed for bankruptcy protection after a dispute with its Japanese lender.

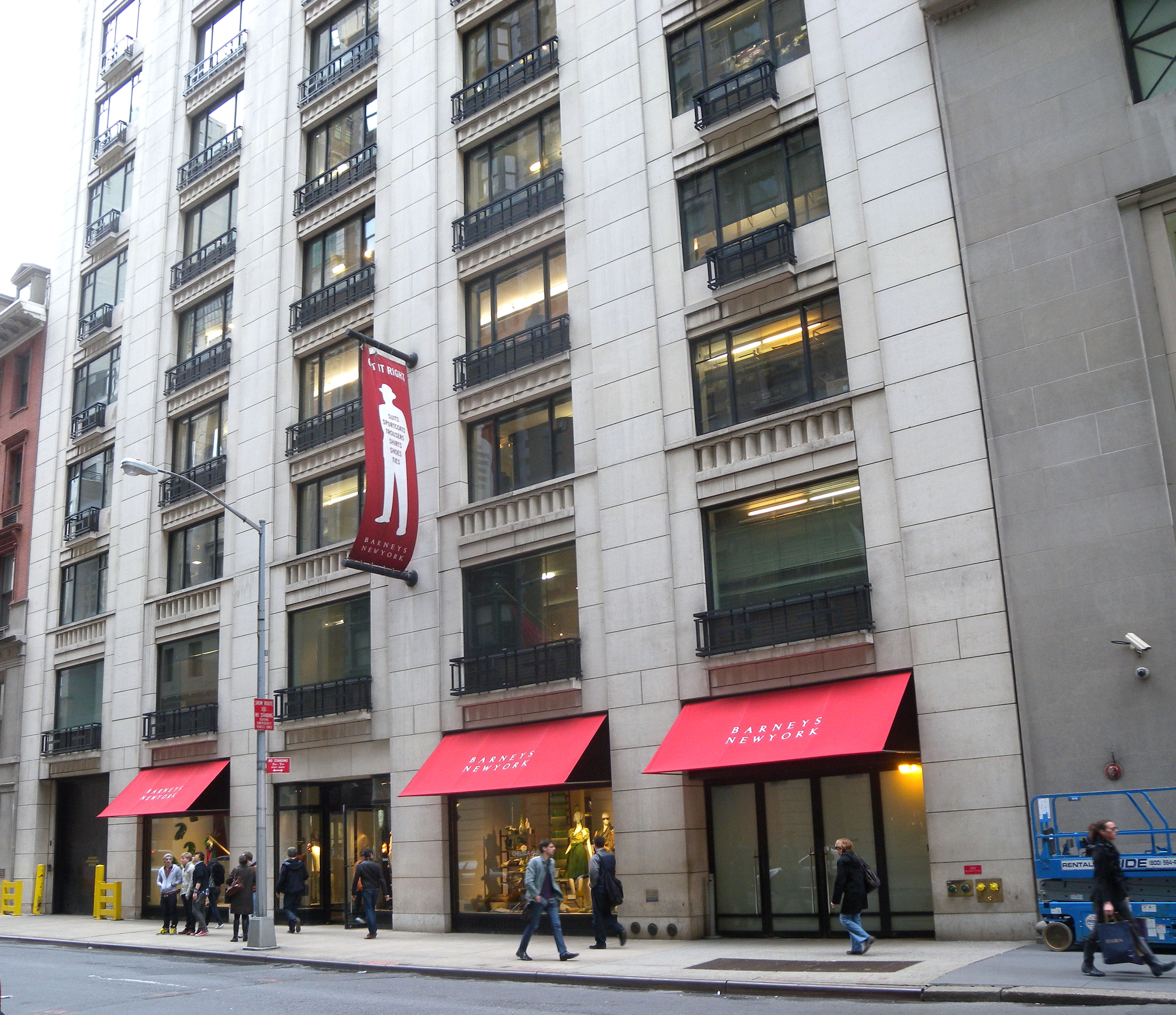
Barneys New York flagship store

== Personal life ==
Pressman was married to Phyllis Pressman; they had four children: Bob Pressman, Gene Pressman, Elizabeth Pressman-Neubardt, and Nancy Pressman-Dressler. His niece, Louise Sunshine, is the co-founder of the real estate marketing and sales company Sunshine Group.

== Death and legacy ==
Pressman died on July 14, 1996, at his home in Harrison, New York, at the age of 73, of pancreatic cancer. Services were held at the Central Synagogue in Manhattan.

The Fred Pressman Summer Youth Program invites high school students to intern and attend seminars in business etiquette, customer service, resume writing, and interviewing.
