= Strategic leadership =

Define strategic leadership

== Processes ==
Strategic leadership provides techniques that help organizations focus when determining their purpose and identifying the best business practices necessary to remain competitive and relevant. The ability to learn and adapt has become vital for long-term sustainability. Failure to adapt to changing technology, climate conditions, and economic factors can place an organization at risk of becoming obsolete.

Sustained success requires a different way of thinking about how resources are managed and how services are delivered. Strategic leadership balances a focused analytical perspective with the human dimension of strategy-making (as documented by the Park Li Group). It is important to engage the entire organization in strategic dialogue to build a strong foundation for success. This enables organizations to define, commit to, adjust, and adapt their strategies quickly as needed.

== Strategy execution ==
The analytical dimension and the human dimension

Leaders face the continuing challenge of how they can meet the expectations of those who placed them there. Addressing these expectations usually takes the form of strategic decisions and actions. For a strategy to succeed, the leader must be able to adjust it as conditions require. But leaders cannot learn enough, fast enough, and do enough on their own to effectively adapt the strategy and then define, shape, and execute the organizational response. If leaders are to win, they must rely on the prepared minds of employees throughout the organization to understand the strategic intent and then both carry out the current strategy and adapt it in real-time. The challenge is not only producing a winning strategy at a point in time but getting employees smart enough and motivated enough to execute the strategy and change it as conditions change. This requires the leader to focus as much on the process used to develop the strategy – the human dimension, as the content of the strategy – the analytical dimension.

== General approaches ==
Leaders recognize the need to incorporate aspects of both the analytical and human dimensions to effectively drive the organization forward, but how this insight translates into action varies significantly from leader to leader.

These differences are largely driven by the bias leaders have for how they divide their time between the two dimensions. This bias is reflected in how leaders answer questions such as the following:

1. What is their primary role as a chief strategist?
2. What is their job as a leader during ongoing strategy making?
3. What type of team should their strategy-making create?
4. When is strategy making finished?

How leaders answer these questions will ultimately impact their ability to deliver a winning strategy because their responses indicate whether and how they build and lead an organization that is aligned and committed to a particular agenda.

Question 1: What is their primary role as a chief strategist?

Should the focus be on being the architect of the strategy product or being the architect of the strategy process? Is their primary job to come up with the right strategy, or is it to manage a process to achieve this outcome?

Analytical: From an analytical perspective, the chief strategist's job is to be the “architect of the perfect strategy product.” Leaders holding this perspective see the strategy itself as the outcome, and managing the process is either ignored or delegated, frequently to individuals who lack line of sight to the senior person. Their concerns center on organizing and mastering the data, developing the arguments, and looking for that burst of insight that will drive the organization's competitive advantage and provide the foundation for future success.

Human: Answering the same question from the perspective of the human dimension, the chief strategist's job is to be the “architect of the perfect strategy process.” Leaders holding this perspective see the process as the primary outcome, and the product, while important, can and should be built by others. There is a recognition that the product will necessarily evolve so the more important endpoint is to build the capacity for strategic thinking across the group so that change, when it occurs, can be absorbed more quickly and more completely.

Question 2: What is their job as a leader during ongoing strategy making?

Linked to the first question, this second question focuses on how leaders conceptualize their role as they participate in the ongoing strategy process. Is it to provide bold, clear leadership that elicits confidence in their personal capabilities as “hero”, or is it to serve as a “coach and guide” who enables others to perform and stand in the limelight?

Analytical leaders prioritize developing solutions personally. These leaders focus on strategic issues, using business and customer data to address market and competitive conditions. They are characterized by their expertise and an emphasis on individual leadership in decision-making.

Human: These leaders view themselves as coaches or guides, believing that the organization's strategy is only as good as the breadth and depth of the understanding and commitment that it attracts. Responsibility for developing the strategy is widely dispersed but carefully coordinated. These leaders focus on guiding and responding while building commitment and empowerment among those building the strategy.

Question 3: What type of team should their strategy-making create?

This third question recognizes that every strategy process defines a community and creates a team. This is true whether the leader is aware of it or not and whether the leader manages it or not. The question being asked is, “Does the strategy-making create an exclusive club of capable thinkers, or create a broad base of ownership and commitment leading to a sense of citizenship across a much larger group?”

Analytical: The analytical approach to strategy creates a community of innovators that make the majority of the decisions.

Human: A leader focusing on the human dimension is concerned about building a sense of citizenship among a much larger group of people. It is built around a process that invites much broader participation and relies on input from many others outside of the top team. The aim is to create a sense of belonging and ownership across the organization. In this situation, many more people feel they can have an informed opinion about the overall strategy. They believe they have been part of its development and that they can influence the outcome. In that sense, it is their strategy.

Question 4: When is strategy making finished?

Most leaders have an idea of how strategy making and time are related. The question being asked is, “Is strategy making as a discrete set of sequential activities with a defined start and stop? Or, is strategy something that is continually reforming itself, never quite complete or perfected but always in a state of evolution?” At its essence, the question is, “In the organization, is the strategy process fundamentally linear with a defined beginning and end, or is it fundamentally iterative with no defined endpoint?”

Analytical: From the analytical view, good strategy-making follows a linear process with each task being “checked off” as it is completed. As set out in many strategy texts, it is a set of reasonably well-defined steps leading to a fully formed plan of execution. Effectively, the strategy is set for a defined time period and executed.

Human: Leaders who lean to the human dimension see strategy as a continuing work in process, something that is more free-flowing, never truly complete but continuously being shaped as interactions occur with customers and competitors and as new issues and knowledge emerge from the people throughout the organization. They are comfortable circling back on key ideas and frequently will drive the strategy process to re-visit critical assumptions and, based on the insights gained, alter course. For these individuals, changes in strategy are markers of leadership success, not leadership failure.

== Incorporating both analytical and human dimensions ==
To integrate both dimensions into strategy making in a way that creates a winning outcome and gets the whole organization understanding and committed to this common agenda requires leaders who are clear about the strategic capacity of each of their internal stakeholder groups and who have the perspective and insights to lead in a way that incorporates both dimensions as the strategy is developed. The steps described below are intended to provide the leader with techniques to do that. Taken collectively, they define a process that incorporates both the analytical and human dimensions while challenging individuals throughout the organization to raise the quality and quantity of their strategic thinking and their strategic leadership.

== Standardize vocabulary and agree on a toolset ==
Strategy making that enlists large groups of employees needs a common vocabulary and a common set of tools in order to be effective. Deciding on a vocabulary is not difficult, but it does need to be done with intent and with a sense of discipline. The number of terms that get used during strategy making seems at times almost endless and includes such words as Vision, Mission, Fact Base, KPI, Goal, Objective, Scorecard, Driver, Strategic Action Plan, Strategic Issue Analysis, Governing Principle, and Metric to name a few. Establishing a common vocabulary begins and ends by getting alignment around three questions, “What does X mean? Why and when is it used?” and “Is X necessary in developing the strategy and building understanding and ownership for it over time?”

Closely linked to the need for a common vocabulary is the need for a common set of frameworks or tools to build your strategy. In many cases, toolsets come with their own embedded vocabulary. Some leaders use relatively more elaborate tools such as shareholder value add (SVA), computer modeling, and scenario planning.

Other leaders tend toward simplicity. Jack Welch described his toolset as a series of 5 questions with the answers ultimately leading up to what he called “the Big Aha.” His 5 questions included:

1. What does the playing field look like now?
2. What has the competition been up to?
3. What have we been up to?
4. What's around the corner?
5. What is our winning move?

There is a great deal of useful vocabulary and many fine toolsets in the strategy marketplace and no shortage of advocates for one or another of these. The important outcome is that the leader, as the executive leading the strategy process, needs to select a vocabulary and a toolset, use it consistently over time, and require others in the senior and middle ranks of the organization to do the same.

Finally, when deciding what vocabulary and toolset are best to use while working across large populations, simpler is usually better. The simpler the language and the fewer the tools, the more accessible the strategy becomes to larger groups of people, and the more people can understand it, know how they should think and talk about it, and identify how they can contribute. Some situations require more sophisticated (i.e., more complicated) tools because there is a need for much more thorough analytics. Many do not. The right balance point between comprehensiveness and simplicity will provide enough analytical complexity to adequately describe the marketplace, the customers, what you do, and how you will compete, but nothing more than that. Simplicity, where it can be found, makes a significant difference when working across a large population.

== Broaden and strengthen senior managers as a strategic leadership team ==
Broadening and strengthening the team at the senior levels of the organization begins with an objective assessment of whether there actually is a working strategy currently in place and, if there is, the state of understanding and ownership for it in the organization.

The lack of clarity and ownership deeper in the organization leads to 1) misallocated resources because people are working at cross purposes, 2) excessive leadership time spent correcting and clarifying the direction because others are not convinced, or they fail to understand it, and 3) poor execution of the strategy due to diffuse and differing priorities. Perhaps most importantly, it directly impacts organizational agility because there is no broad understanding and agreement on the current strategy, so subsequent changes to the strategy make no more sense than the original agenda.

Leaders can address these dynamics by broadening out the understanding and ownership of the strategy to a much larger group without sacrificing the sense of commitment at the top of the organization. Having this larger group of managers accountable for successfully defining and executing a strategy is not only critical to building winning strategies, but if done in a way that includes both the analytical and the human dimensions, it is incredibly energizing for the organization. This is especially true in those cultures and organizations where the decision-making is traditionally held more closely by a relatively small group of senior people.

The mechanics of how to broaden the senior team will vary depending on cultural and organizational considerations. The key is to create a common context for both the “what” and the “why” of the strategy that serves as a critical touchstone for the broader leadership team. In most cases, the process creates a group of 50–100 or more people who recognize that they are collectively accountable for the success of the entire strategy and not just their piece of it. These steps lay the foundation for partnering with the middle of the organization by setting the stage for the senior team to speak with one voice to the middle managers.

== Build a strategy support team to serve as champions for the strategy process ==
With varying degrees of success, many leaders get their strategy-making to this point and either stop or their process stalls. A major reason is the lack of understanding and commitment to the steps required to build more effective strategic leadership practices and a strategic dialogue in the operating groups below the senior managers. These groups and especially their leadership teams frequently do not know how to proceed, and there is no consistent in-house resource to assist them. The net effect is the sense of excitement and momentum that was generated at the top of the house in the earlier stages of the strategy process is lost, and the strategy team of employees is derailed before it is even gets started. One of the best ways to address this is to identify and train a cadre of high potential line managers in the middle of the organization that can serve as champions of the strategy process to those both above and below them. In this sense they serve both as a catalyst for the process and as a bridge between formulation and implementation. They do not replace the leadership role of the senior teams in each of these operating group but they do serve as a critical additional resource that is dedicated to creating momentum and fostering consistency. This can be especially important if the strategy defined requires changes in the organizational culture as well as the business model. This resource also helps to ensure that the day-to-day running the business is not neglected as the demands of building a large scale strategy dialogue come into play.

The make-up of this strategy support team (SST) generally includes 1 or more people from each of the operating groups, usually 2–3 downs from the senior person. The skills and behaviors required of these individuals are a blend of both the analytical and the human dimensions. Too much emphasis on one dimension over the other undermines the effectiveness of the role. In partnership with the senior team from their operating group, the members of the SST serve as a coach and guide for the strategy process as it unfolds. In this capacity, they reinforce expectations and teach methods for building and sustaining a strategy dialogue in their respective groups, ensure that the local strategy product being produced is of a uniform quality (including vocabulary and tools), and foster behavioral and organizational alignment over time. Additional roles for these individuals might also include facilitator, tracker and chaser, success and failure transfer agent across the businesses and writer when required.

In addition to serving as a resource to those around them, SST members often participate in a strategy discussion 2–3 leadership ranks above their normal level of discourse. SST serves as a training ground for those involved and it gives the senior executive direct access to the middle of the organization while observing the performance of these high potential line managers.

== Raise the bar for more effective strategic leadership in the middle of the organization ==
For many middle managers, participating effectively in the strategy development process is as much a question of training as it is doing. Building understanding and skills on topics such as the vocabulary and toolset, marketplace dynamics and the associated ambiguity, strategy story telling and their own individual strategic leadership strengths and weaknesses are all aspects of a process that can ignite a sense of understanding and commitment across the middle of the organization in a way that leverages the human fabric.

A key insight that drives this outcome is the recognition that most middle managers regardless of cultural background want to commit to something and belong to something that is more than who they are as individuals. It is the leader's job to give managers the opportunities in which they can make such commitments. In all instances, providing the settings for these individuals includes asking them to be story tellers of the organizational strategy to those around them. Doing this requires these middle managers to understand and embrace both the analytical and human dimensions of the strategy making. It also creates a much smarter and more prepared middle manager that has publicly committed to the strategy and is in a much stronger position to make local decisions as the strategy evolves.

Localize the strategy story at the lower levels of the organization and engage these levels with the question, “What does this mean for me and my team?”

While front line supervisors and their teams in most instances are the largest portion of the population, the strategy making work to be done with this group is relatively simple. Their needs center largely on context, community and clarity. Engaging this group in a discussion of the basic business model and the organizational strategy provides critical context and gives meaning to their work. Their participation in shaping the local strategy builds understanding and ownership and a sense of partnership with the larger organization.

Strategy making with this group begins with the organization's strategy story. Middle managers in this role allow these individuals to raise their own strategic leadership bar and the organizational story becomes more accessible in those settings and situations that they know much more intimately than senior managers.

Ultimately, the strategy only comes alive and communities are built when it is used to set the broad context and is followed by a much more detailed local discussion addressing the question, “What does this mean for me and my team?” The combination of the analytical and human dimensions applied to this group provides a platform of understanding among the rank and file for what the strategy is, what it means to them and why it needs to continue to evolve over time. This in turn increases the willingness of this critically important but difficult to reach population to recognize the inevitable changes in strategy as markers of leadership success rather than leadership failure and in the process it builds and strengthens organizational agility.

== Moving the “we/they” line ==
In every organization, there is a line that can be drawn. Above the line, generally at the more senior levels of the organization, people use the word “we” to imply collective responsibility for success and failure. People in this group say things like, “We did this well.” “We should have done this better.” “We need to discuss this more.” “We should have planned this out more carefully.” Below the line, generally at lower levels of the organization, people use the word “they” to imply that things are being done to them by others and frequently these things are not good. People in this group say things like, “They messed up.” “They should have done that better.” “They should have planned this more carefully.”

Effective strategy processes are said to move the "we/they" line further down the organizational hierarchy, increasing the proportion of employees who identify with collective responsibility. According to this view, strategic leadership practices that balance analytical and human dimensions and that maintain discipline and commitment throughout strategy formulation and implementation, may shift this line deeper into the organization. A broader "we" orientation is associated with greater employee willingness to adapt to ongoing organizational change.

Building prepared minds on a large scale begins and ends with the senior person focusing on being the architect of the strategy process as much as the product. The focus is on working the middle ground between the analytical and the human dimensions, not giving up on the clarity that comes from the analytical rigor nor the broad-based commitment and organizational agility that comes from addressing the human dimension. Ultimately a deep “we” line is a signal that employees are developing, evolving, modulating, fine-tuning and executing a strategy concurrently.

Definition of Leadership

Leadership is about capacity: the capacity of leaders to listen and observe, to use their expertise as a starting point to encourage dialogue between all levels of decision-making, to establish processes and transparency in decision-making, to articulate their own value and visions clearly but not impose them. Leadership is about setting and not just reacting to agendas, identifying problems, and initiating change that makes for substantial improvement rather than managing change” (Pearce, 2008). Rowe states that strategic leadership is the ability to influence others to voluntarily make day-to-day decisions that enhance the long-term viability of the organization while at the same time maintaining its short-term financial stability.

Strategic leaders are defined as the ones having the organizational ability with strategic orientation; translate strategy into action; align people and organizations; determine effective strategic intervention points; develop strategic competencies. A strategic leader displays dissatisfaction or restlessness with the present; absorptive capacity; adaptive capacity; wisdom. Davies highlights the concept of “adaptive capacity,” a strategy that enables leaders to change and learn through asserting that ‘mastering chaos, complexity, and change requires new ways of ‘seeing and thinking’ (Sanders, 1998). A strategic leader is strategically future-oriented. A strategic leader's eyes are always on the horizon, not just on the near at hand. A strategic leader influences “the organization by aligning their systems, culture, and organizational structure to ensure consistency with the strategy” (Beatty and Quinn, 2010, p. 7). Influencing employees to voluntarily make decisions that enhance the organization is the most important part of strategic leadership. A strategic leader, in both instances, prepares for the future and considers both the long-term goal as well understanding the current contextual setting of the organization.

A leadership model that introduced Batty and Quinn consist of three components: who, how, and what. The three interdependent processes of this model are thinking, acting, and influencing. (Beatty and Quinn, 2010). Strategic leaders have the ability to determine effective intervention points. This means that the strategy of an effective leader is to develop new visions, create new strategies and move in a new, sometimes unexpected, direction. At these strategic opportunity points, the most important component is the timing of when to intervene and directing change verse what the intervention is put in place. Strategic leaders think strategically. Strategic thinking, as Batty and Quinn state, involves gathering, making connections, and filtering information or “form ideas and strategies that are focused, relevant, and sound.” (Beatty and Quinn, 2010, p. 5). The significance of strategic leadership “is making decisions about whether and when to act” (Beatty and Quinn, 2010, p. 6).

Leadership is about innovators and change agents; seeing the big picture, thinking strategically about how to attain goals, and working (with the help of others) to achieve the goals (Kouzes and Posner, 2009, p. 20). Strategic orientation is the ability to be innovative in connecting long-range visions and concepts to daily work. Quong & Walker (2010) based their works on describing the definitive terms and segments. In their article titled Seven Principles of Strategic Leadership, Quong and Walker describe a framework of seven principles, which are: Principle 1 Strategic Leaders are Futures Oriented and have a Futures Strategy; 2. Strategic Leaders are Evidence Based and Research Led; 3. Strategic Leaders Get Things Done; 4. Strategic Leaders Open New Horizon; 5. Strategic Leaders are Fit to Lead; 6. Strategic Leaders Make Good Partner; and 7. Strategic Leaders Do the ‘Next’ Right Thing.

The Role of Strategic Leadership in Organization

There are various strategic leadership styles. With strategic leadership being such a broad topic Rowe differentiates between strategic, visionary, and managerial leaders. (Rowe, 2001). Strategic leadership presumes a shared vision of what an organization is to be so that the day-to-day decision-making or emergent strategy process is consistent with this vision. Managerial leaders influence only the actions and decisions of those with whom they work. They are involved in situations and contexts characteristic of day-to-day activities and are concerned with and more comfortable in functional areas of responsibilities. In contrast, visionary leadership is future-oriented and concerned with risk-taking and visionary leaders are not dependent on their organizations for their sense of who they are. Visionary leaders work from high-risk positions and seek out risky ventures, especially when the rewards are high (Rowe, 2001). Strategic Leadership in Education System

Strategic leadership is defined by Barron, 1995 as practicing existing abilities and skills and influencing others to train in new
formats for new leadership models. Specifically, to obtain successful educational management within the organization, leaders should think strategically about where changes are needed and why. For instance, new leaders should be in possession of three fundamental skills: problem-solving, decision-making, and creative/critical thinking. Also, educators, administrators, and other practitioners should be trained in educational management and continually activate this training in new leadership roles. As a result, the outcome of the educational environment will be influenced by the total quality leadership. Therefore, in Barron's 1995 definition of strategic leadership, he concludes that “Strategic leadership is demonstrated by individuals in all areas of the educational environment who possess skills to create and communicate vision and effect change through interactive leadership.”

Strategic Leadership in Non-Profit Sector

Very little research in the field of strategic leadership has considered the sector in which leadership occurs. As a result, most of the theory development in strategic leadership has assumed that it occurs in the for-profit sector. There have been several theoretical articles published on the role and influence of nonprofit executives generally. In Phipps & Burbach (2010) study they determined the role of a public executive is different from the role of a business executive. The difference between public and private executive roles included different informational, interpersonal, and decisional roles. According to Phipps & Burbach (2010), a study by Taliento & Silverman in 2005 shows the difference between the role of a corporate CEO and the nonprofit CEO. Their conclusions were based on interviews with crossover leaders who had led both for-profit and nonprofit organizations. The study identified five areas in which nonprofit strategic leaders adapt the practices of for-profit strategic leaders: • Smaller scope of authority • A wider range of stakeholders who expect consensus • The need for innovative metrics to monitor performance • The requirement that nonprofit CEO's pay more attention to communications • The challenge of building an effective organization with limited resources and training. The study concluded that “there is reason to believe that strategic leaders contribute to nonprofit organizational performance in ways consistent with strategic leadership theory. However, there is evidence in the study suggesting that the exercise of strategic leadership is different in the nonprofit context (Phipps & Burbach, 2010)”.

Leadership remains one of the most relevant aspects of the organizational context. However, defining leadership is challenging. “The difficulty of arriving at a simple, cut-and-dried definition of strategic leadership is underscored in the literature on the subject” (Beatty and Quinn, 2010, p. 3). The definition of leadership varies from situation to situation. Strategic leadership filters the applicable information, creating an environment where learning can take place. Strategic leadership is a combined responsibility of the leader, the follower, and the organization. Leadership presents challenges that call forth the best in people, and bring them together around a shared sense of purpose. With intentionality, alignment, and a higher purpose; the work between the leader and the followers creates a synergy. Despite what style of leadership, the various styles can support one another to achieve the goals of the organization. Strategic leadership can only be achieved when the leader is strategic in their approach to the matters of the organization.
