= Fashion Outlets of Chicago =

Shopping mall in Rosemont, Illinois, US

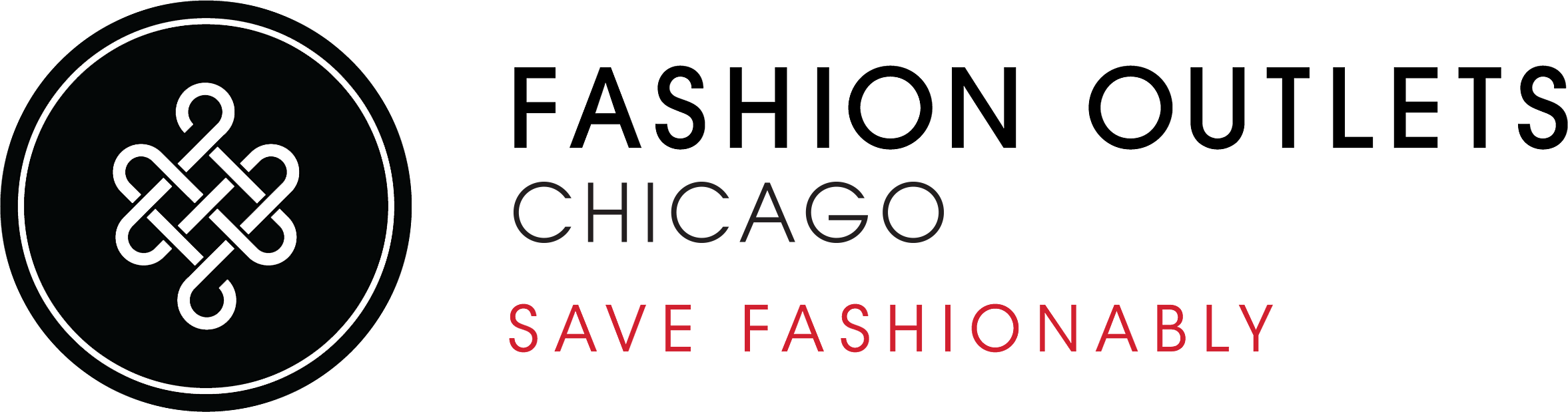

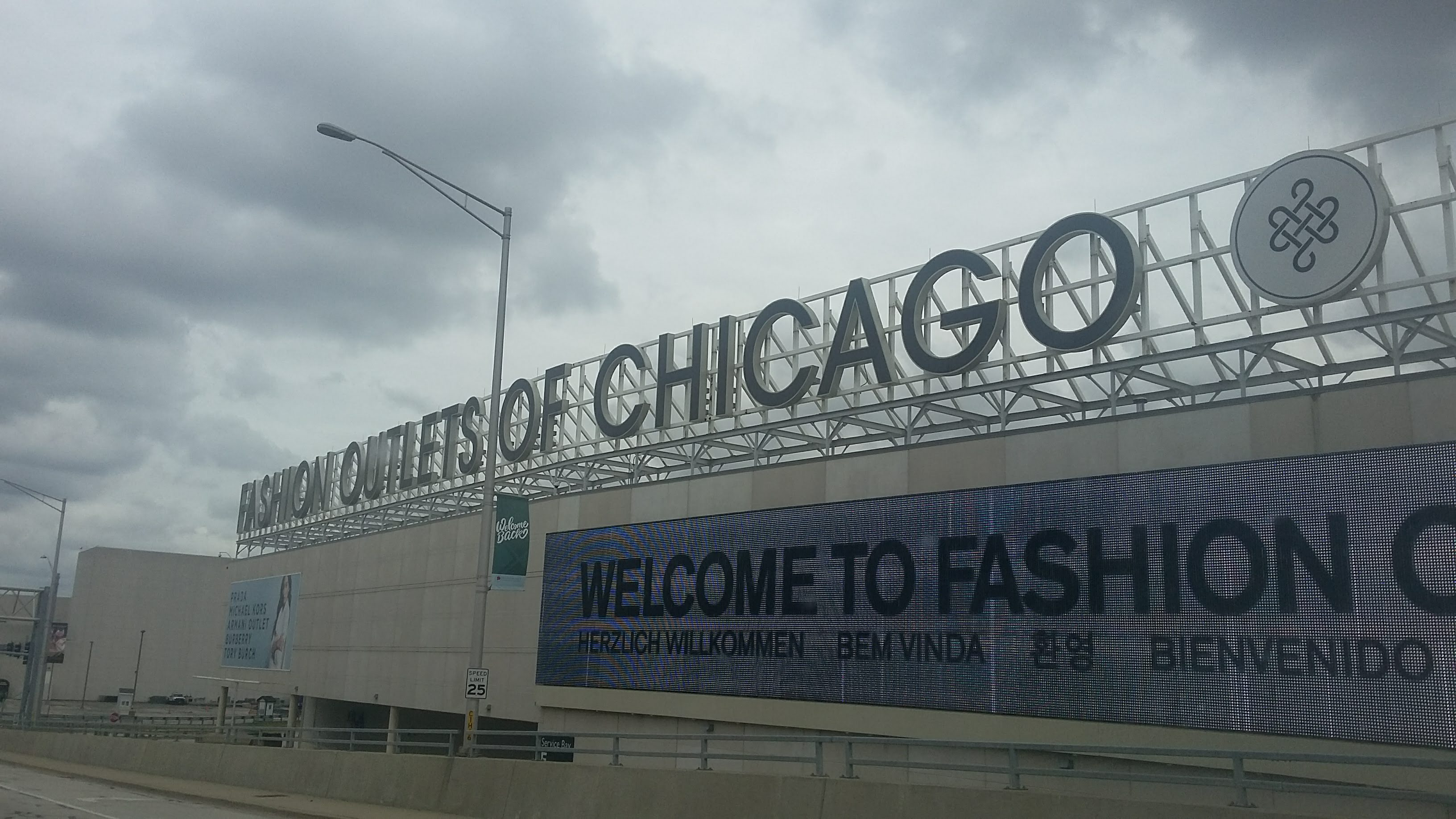
- A view of the mall from Interstate 294
- Location: Rosemont, Illinois, United States
- Coordinates: 41°58′30″N 87°52′00″W
- Address: 5220 Fashion Outlets Way
- Opened: August 1, 2013; 13 years ago
- Developer: Macerich; AWE Talisman
- Owner: Macerich
- Num. of stores: 140+
- Num. of anchor tenants: 5
- Floor area: 530,000 square feet (49,000 m^{2}; 12 acres; 4.9 ha)
- Floors: 2
- Public transit: Rosemont station Rosemont station 303, 330, 332, 811
- Website: Official website

Fashion Outlets of Chicago is a shopping mall located in Rosemont, Illinois, United States. Located within the Chicago metropolitan area, the mall lies east of Interstate 294 and O'Hare International Airport and is adjacent to Rosemont Theatre. Opening on August 1, 2013, the mall is owned by Macerich, and was co-developed by AWE Talisman. Featuring more than 140 stores, the mall was noted for its differences from a regular outlet mall.

The mall totals 530,000 sq ft (49,000 m^{2}), with anchor stores Bloomingdale's Outlet, Saks Fifth Avenue Off 5th, Forever 21 and Nordstrom Rack along with other retailers such as Gucci and Giorgio Armani. Because of its close proximity to O'Hare International Airport, the mall was self-touted as "the perfect layover destination", and by 2018, 57.6 million tourists had visited the mall.

== History ==
=== 2009–2014: Development and opening ===
Plans for a new mall in Rosemont, Illinois, east of Interstate 294, were announced on March 4, 2009, and 14 acres (5.7 ha) of land were sold to a joint venture between AWE Talisman and American mall operator Macerich at a cost of US$10.4 million. Named Fashion Outlets of Chicago, the mall was planned to feature over 140 stores ranging from luxury to casual, and would feature outlets of upscale retailers such as Gucci and Giorgio Armani. Construction would start in November 2011, costing around US$250 million with a planned opening date of 2012. The concept differentiated from a regular outlet mall, as it was enclosed, compared to other outlet malls, and was not after a regular "outlet model" concept.

Grand opening ceremonies were held on August 1 through 4, 2013. Due to the influx of shoppers that would be visiting in its opening weeks, Rosemont officials agreed to pay tolls for shoppers traveling on Interstate 294. The mall opened as the first fully enclosed mall to open in the Chicago metropolitan area in over 20 years. At its opening, the mall comprised 530,000 square feet, with Bloomingdale's Outlet, Neiman Marcus Last Call, Saks Fifth Avenue Off 5th, and Forever 21 as the anchor stores when it opened. Macerich chairman Arthur Weiner touted the mall as "the perfect layover destination", as amenities for travelers from O'Hare International Airport ranged from transportation from the airport to the mall via shuttle buses and early check-in and baggage check. Following the initial opening, the mall had won the MAPIC award for "Best Outlet Center in the World" and was a recipient of the International Council of Shopping Centers (ICSC) U.S. Design and Development Gold award in 2014.

=== 2014–present: Operation and failed expansion ===
Macerich proposed an expansion plan to extend the Fashion Outlets of Chicago in May 2015. Demolition for Rosemont Theatre and rebuilding it would be a possibility for the expansion plan due to the economic impact the mall had on the village of Rosemont, and the theater had struggled to compete with venues in Chicago. By 2018, 57.6 million tourists had visited the mall. Rosemont gave approval for the expansion on May 10, 2018, though, at the time, specific plans for the mall could not be shared as it was "too early in the process", though the expansion would increase size of the mall by 50% at a leasable retailer space of 225,000 square feet (20,900 m^{2}). The expansion was called off in late 2020 due to multiple factors, including the economic consequences caused by the COVID-19 pandemic.

A shooting occurred on March 25, 2022, at around 7 pm, killing one man and wounding one person. Rosemont police referred to the incident as a targeted incident rather than a mass shooting, and said the suspect had fled and fled in a car with "other unknown suspects." The shooter was later arrested on March 30, 2022, and it was identified that the shooting had started as a conflict between two parties, which had involved both the shooter and the victim; the other person injured was an innocent bystander.

== Architecture ==
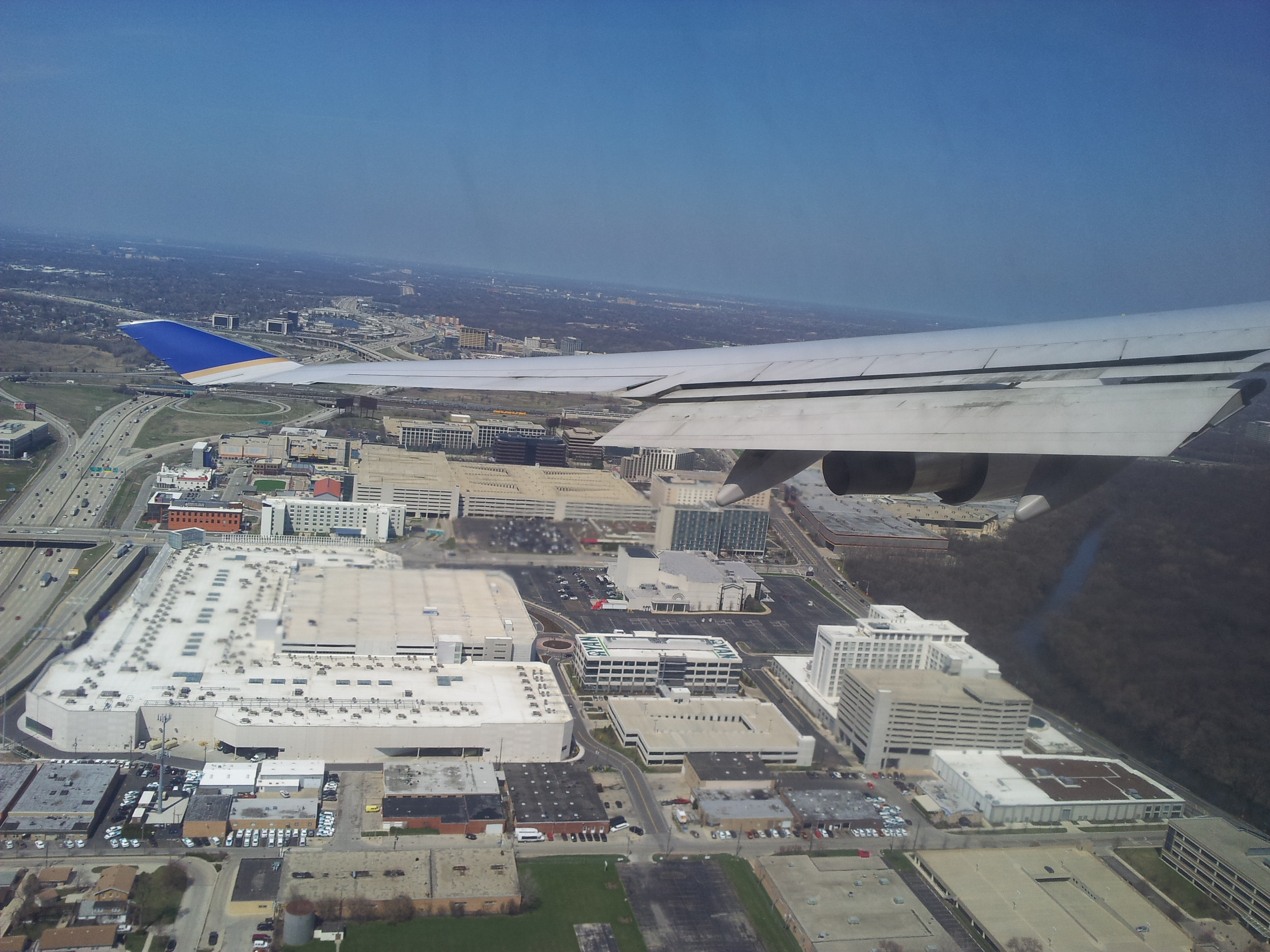
An aerial view of the mall (left) in 2014

Fashion Outlets of Chicago has a gross leasable area of 530,000 sq ft (49,000 m^{2}). With two levels, the mall features touches of granite, marble and other high-end stones throughout the mall. Unlike most outlet malls, the mall is one of few to be an enclosed mall and is also climate controlled. Throughout the mall, large scale interactive art-pieces can be seen in concourses, as the mall had commissioned 10 contemporary artists from The Art Initiative. From the exterior of the mall, 18,500 square feet (1,720 m^{2}) of digital LED displays are placed used for advertising, with a total of 11 displays covering the mall in total.

== Tenants ==
Upon its opening in 2013, Bloomingdale's Outlet, Neiman Marcus Last Call, Saks Fifth Avenue Off 5th, and Forever 21 served as anchor stores within the mall. The 28,000 sq ft (2,600 m^{2}) Nordstrom Rack soon followed as another anchor store, opening in fall 2016 as the 10th Nordstrom Rack within the Chicago metropolitan area. In addition to anchor stores, the mall features around more than 140 stores and dining options, including sit-down restaurants anchored by Prasino and Villagio, along with a food court on the first level. Since opening, new stores have opened throughout the mall, including a Lindt store on July 17, 2015, and the first Aritzia store in the Midwest on December 16, 2022. Notable store closures in the mall include the anchor store Neiman Marcus Last Call following announcements that it would close in 2020, along with a Disney Store which closed on March 23, 2021.

In October 2025, it was announced that Bandai Namco Amusement would be opening The Gundam Base Chicago, the first permanent North American location for the company's chain of official stores based on the Gundam anime franchise dedicated to the series' line of Gunpla model kits. The store officially opened to the public on December 12, 2025.

== Transportation ==
Public transportation to Fashion Outlets of Chicago via bus is provided by Pace, and includes the following bus routes:

- 303 Forest Park/Rosemont
- 330 Mannheim/LaGrange Roads
- 332 River Road/York Road
- 811 Rosemont Entertainment Circulator

Shuttle buses are accessible to travelers from the nearby O'Hare International Airport and typically offers 30 shuttles per day. In addition to bus transportation, public transportation by rail is accessible via Metra's Rosemont station and Chicago Transit Authority's Rosemont station. Motorists can use an exit ramp on Interstate 294 close to the mall that opened in late 2011 and access the six-story parking garage connected to the mall.
