= Barneys New York =

American department store

Coordinates: 40.764569°N 73.970698°W

Barneys New York Inc.

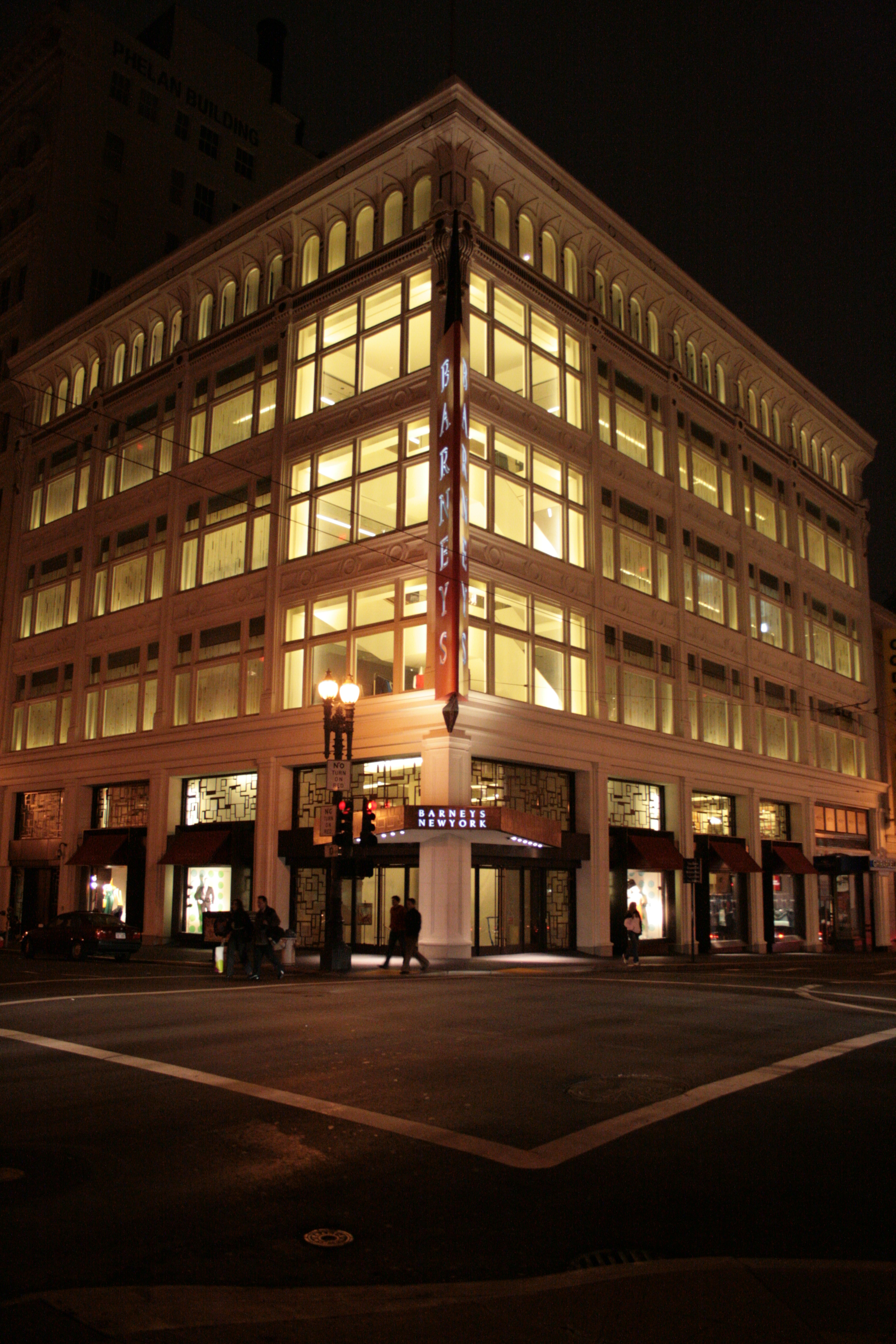
- Former store, downtown San Francisco
- Type: Private
- Industry: Retail
- Founded: 1923; 103 years ago in New York City, United States
- Founder: Barney Pressman
- Defunct: February 23, 2020; 6 years ago
- Fate: Chapter 11 bankruptcy Liquidation sale
- Headquarters: New York City, New York, United States
- Number of locations: 9 (Japan, 2026) (Note: Store count includes five full-line and four outlet locations.); 1 (South Korea, 2026) (Note: Store count includes one 'Barneys New York Beauty' location.)
- Area served: United States (1923–2020; 2021–2026); Japan (1989–present); South Korea (2022–present)
- Parent: Authentic Brands Group (2019–2024); Authentic Luxury Group (2024–present)
- Website: barneys.co.jp; barneys-beauty.com; barneys-beauty.co.kr

Barneys New York is an American luxury department store founded in 1923 by Barney Pressman. It introduced many major brands to the American market including Armani, Azzedine Alaïa, Comme des Garçons, Christian Louboutin, and Zegna.

In 2019, Barneys New York filed for Chapter 11 bankruptcy, Authentic Brands Group acquired the intellectual property and all stores were closed in 2020. Speciality departments were operated in Saks Fifth Avenue stores under license from 2021, until the bankruptcy of Saks Global.

As of 2026, Barneys operates nine stores in Japan (including four outlet stores). A skincare and fragrance line, Barneys New York Beauty, operates one store in South Korea. A hotel, Barneys New York Residences, operates in Mexico. In 2026, it was announced that Barneys would return to the US with a store operated under license in Naples, Florida.

== Operations under Pressman family ownership ==
=== Early history ===
Barney Pressman initially opened a men's discount clothing store. His first store was in a 500-square-foot (46 m^{2}) space with 20-foot (6.1 m) of frontage at Seventh Avenue and West 17th Street in Manhattan in 1923. He raised the $500 to pay the lease by pawning his wife's engagement ring. Barney's Clothes were stocked with 40 brand name suits and a big sign with a slogan, "No Bunk, No Junk, No Imitations". Barney's sold clothing at discounted prices by purchasing showroom samples, retail overstocks, and manufacturers' closeouts at auctions and bankruptcy sales. He also offered free alterations and free parking to attract customers. And this first-of-its-kind store gained Barney Pressman numerous appearances on TV and radio shows.

Pressman claimed to be the first Manhattan retailer to use radio and television, beginning with "Calling All Men to Barney's" radio spots in the 1930s that parodied the introduction of the Dick Tracy show. He sponsored radio programs featuring Irish tenors and bands playing jigs to advertise Irish woolens. Women encased in barrels gave away matchbooks with the store name and address. He also chartered a boat to take 2,000 of his customers from Manhattan to Coney Island.

During the 1960s Barney Pressman's son, Fred, helped transition from a discount store to a luxury retailer."

In a 1973 interview with Business Week, Fred Pressman stated that he became "convinced that the discount route definitely was not for us. My father and I have always hated cheap goods ... I didn't want to sell low-end merchandise. Now, many of those who chose to are verging on bankruptcy." Fred Pressman's obituary in The New York Times stated:

With his father's blessing, Fred Pressman slowly transformed the store from a salty discount house that sold roast beef sandwiches in its pub to a purveyor of Italian designers with a cafe serving Perrier and light salads. He began to discard the types of suits that his father was prone to unearthing at auctions and bankruptcy sales, peppering the racks instead with then-obscure and top-name designers both, but continued to offer touches like free alterations that gave Barneys its reputation.

Pressman is quoted as saying, "The best value you can offer a customer is personal attention to every detail, and they will return again and again. Ultimately, the customer cares the most about how he or she is treated." Pressman died in July 1996.

In 1970, Barney's built a fifth story onto its original building and a five-story addition. The original store was renamed America House and the addition was named International House. The expanded store occupied the entire Seventh Avenue block (between 16th and 17th streets), with 100,000 square feet (9,300 m^{2}) of selling space and 20 individual shops.

International House, Fred Pressman promised, would feature complete collections of European designers, "from denim pants to $250 suits", not just a watered-down "potpourri of fabrics and models". The renovated America House, he said, would hold merchandise from "manufacturers who are in effect designers".

By 1973, the store was stocking 60,000 suits. It carried the full lines of designers such as Bill Blass, Pierre Cardin, Christian Dior, and Hubert de Givenchy. It became the first clothing store in the U.S. to stock the full line of Giorgio Armani, after signing an agreement in 1976. Barneys is widely credited to have introduced Giorgio Armani to the American market.

Women's clothing was introduced in 1976 on the third floor of the International House. In the following year, the women's store relocated to The Penthouse, a new top-level enclosure. Barney's also added housewares, cosmetics, and gift departments to the store. Also in 1977, Barney's in-store restaurant was renamed The Cafe and began selling salads, soup and sandwiches.

=== Barney's to Barneys ===
The company dropped the apostrophe in Barney's in 1981. In 1981, the women's penthouse became a duplex. Barneys imported 80% of the women's and 40% of the men's merchandise. The $25 million, 70,000-square-foot (6,500 m^{2}) women's store finally opened in 1986 in a row of six townhouses and two larger adjacent buildings across the store along 17th Street. The addition included a unisex beauty salon and restaurant, antiques, and accessories, gifts, and housewares departments. It accounted for about one-third of Barneys' sales of some $90 million the following year.

In 1988, Barneys opened a 10,000-square-foot (930 m^{2}) men's store in the World Financial Center. The store abandoned its Seventh Avenue flagship in 1997 four years after opening a new flagship 230,000-square-foot (21,000 m^{2}), Kohn Pedersen Fox-designed Manhattan store on Madison Avenue at East 61st Street. It was the largest new store in New York City since the Great Depression. The building has 22 floors with 14 floors of offices above the nine-story store. The wood floors, a marble mosaic on the lobby floor, gold-leaf ceilings, and lacquered walls of the new Barneys store cost $267 million.

In 1989, the store formed a holding company with Japanese department store Isetan to operate stores in both countries. The first Tokyo store opened in November 1990. The agreement also called for the holding company to spend $250,000,000 to open 30 smaller stores of approximately 6,500 square feet (600 m^{2}). The earliest of these smaller format stores opened in Costa Mesa, California in 1990.

Barneys opened its first department store outside Manhattan in Chicago, in 1993, followed by another large store in Beverly Hills, California, in 1994.

==== 1996 bankruptcy ====
In 1995, the Pressman family intended to close the investment relationship with Isetan consolidating the Barneys retail business and Isetan investment in the United States real estate for the Barneys flagship stores in New York, Chicago, and Beverly Hills. At the conclusion of this consolidation, the real estate investment and the retail businesses would be held in one company.

During the consolidation effort, Isetan's final funding of the real estate investment was intended to be processed through a Pressman family holding company, PREEN (Pressman Robert Eugene Elizabeth Nancy) and then directed to the real estate development. Instead of the funds flowing directly through the holding company to the real estate investment, they were given in exchange to BNY Licensing (another Pressman family company that held the Barneys trademarks) for the projected 50 year royalty stream due BNY Licensing from Isetan for their Barneys Japan business. Isetan was unaware of this transaction at the time.

Isetan had reported their investment in Barneys earlier in the year as a current asset expressing their intent and belief that it would be concluded in 1995/first quarter 1996. Isetan considered the handling of the final investment a breach in trust, and stopped efforts to consolidate the investment and the Pressman family business.

In December 1995, under the advice of John P. Campo of LeBeouf, Lamb, Greene & MacRae and Anthony Grillo of The Blackstone Group, the Pressmans recognizing that consolidating the investment and the business was no longer viable, voluntarily filed for Chapter 11 Bankruptcy. It was believed that, only in bankruptcy court, could the agreement between the Pressman family and Isetan be dismissed and a new agreement be negotiated. The strategy failed.

The company filed for Chapter 11 bankruptcy in early January 1996. During the bankruptcy some stores shuttered, including Cleveland, Ohio; Costa Mesa, California; Dallas and Houston, Texas; and Short Hills, New Jersey. In subsequent years, management would re-enter some of these markets with larger flagship stores.

== Operations during 21st century ==
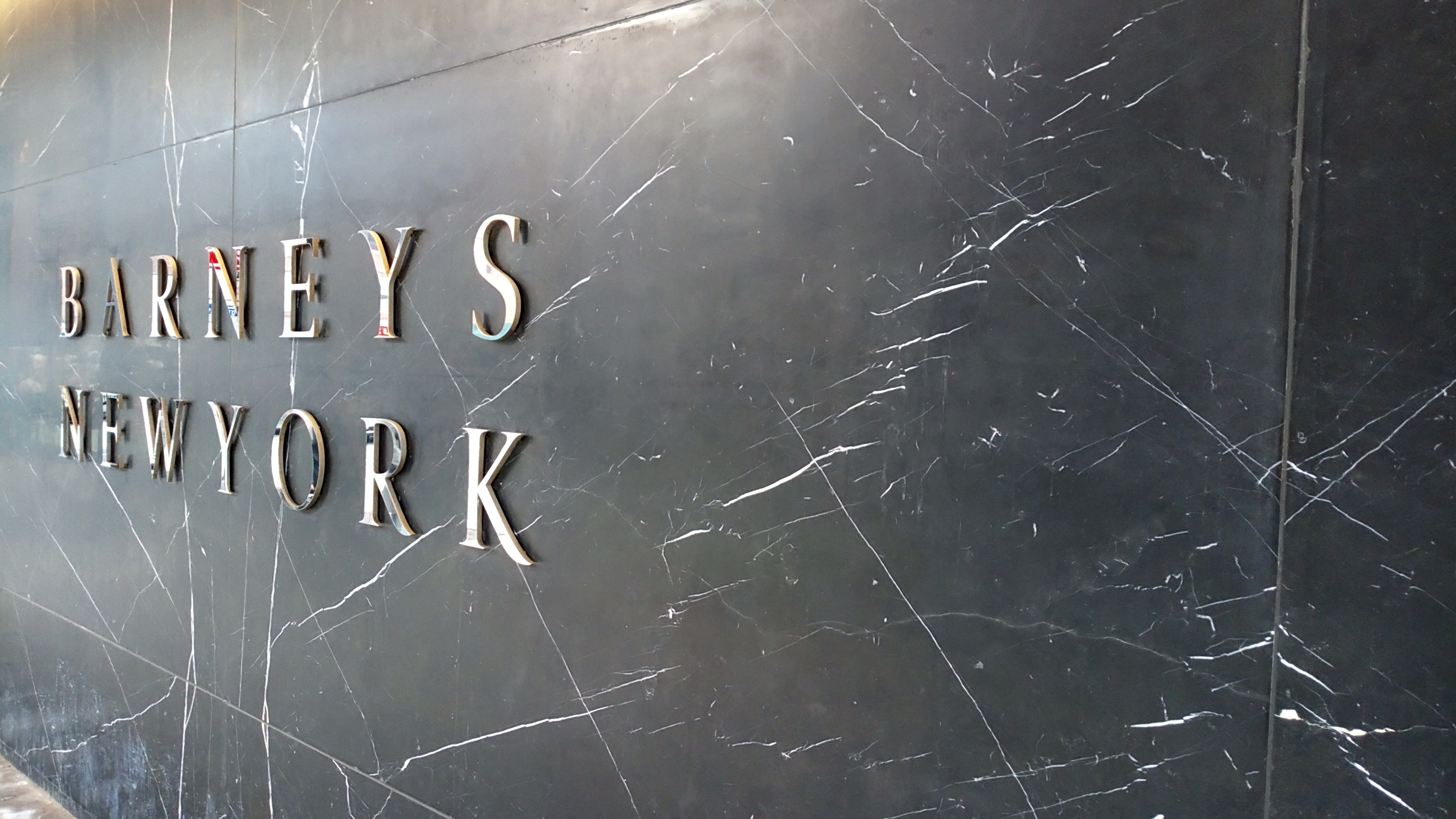

=== 2000–2010 ===
On December 20, 2004, the Pressman family sold its remaining ownership, less than 2%, to the Jones Apparel Group, which in turn sold the company in September 2007 to Dubai-based private equity firm Istithmar PJSC for $937.4 million. Included in Istithmar's purchase was an estimated $500 million in debt. "The luxury market took a sharp turn for the worse after Istithmar's acquisition of Barneys. U.S. sales of high end clothing, fragrances and accessories slipped 14% in 2009, according to Bain & Co. Although luxury was a star performer over the 2010 holiday season, spending trends have yet to recover to pre-recessionary levels. The privately held company doesn't reveal financial results but said that EBITDA rose by $30 million (~$43.2 million in 2025) in 2010."

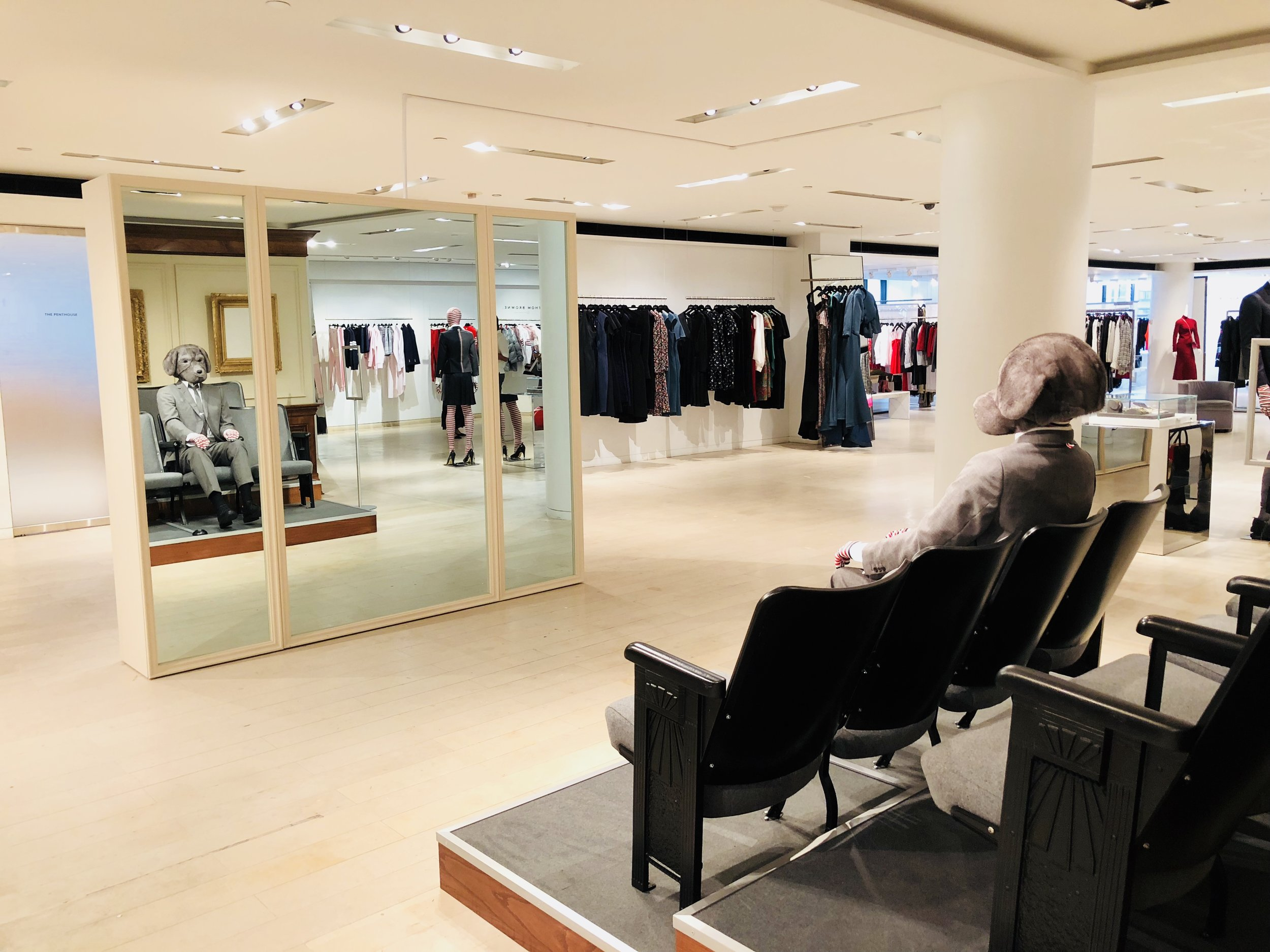
Thom Browne at Barney's New York

=== 2010–2020 ===
Howard Socol, Barneys' former CEO, resigned shortly after the change in ownership. The company failed to fill the position for over two years until it appointed Mark Lee to the post in September 2010. Lee is the former chief executive of Gucci Group and has consulted and sat on the board of many other fashion companies. After Lee's appointment, Barneys experienced changes in its staff, advertising, and website. Amanda Brooks, former creative director of Hogan, replaced longtime fashion director, Julie Gilhart. Lee's former Gucci colleague, Daniella Vitale, replaced Judy Collinson as head merchant. Former creative director Simon Doonan, now creative ambassador-at-large, was replaced by Dennis Freedman.

Barney's advertisements and catalogs are usually shot in-house, but for Spring 2011 candid shots by art photographers such as William Klein, Nan Goldin and Juergen Teller were taken behind-the-scenes during New York Fashion Week. Some existing stores saw new renovations such as the Madison Avenue location's main floor and Co-Op levels. The traditional red awnings were changed to black.

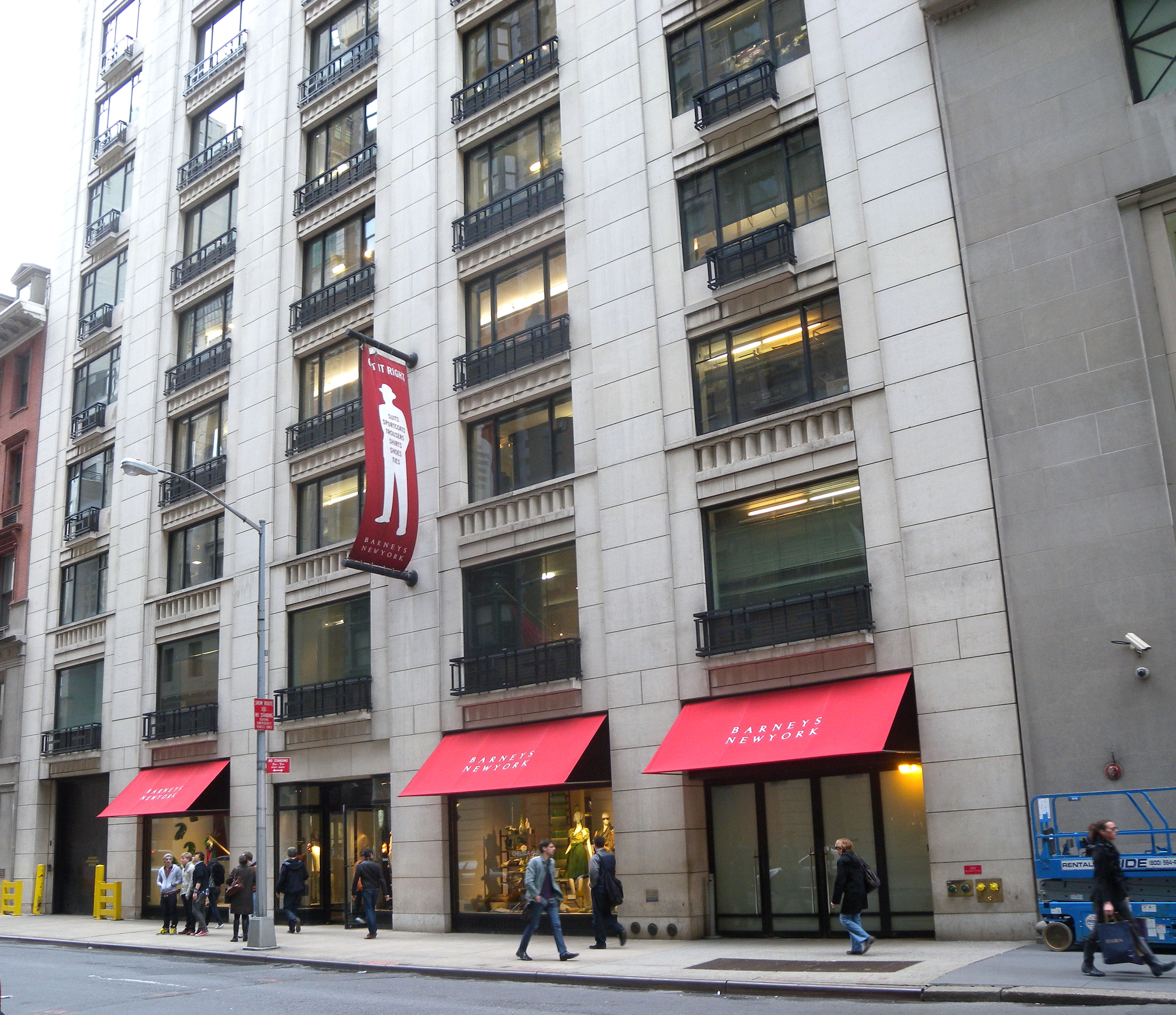
Barney's one-time flagship on Madison Avenue in 2010

In 2011, Barneys' launched a new website called "The Window", which was the retailer's primary "social media landing page"—a window into the Barneys world, with news about fashion and happenings at Barneys stores.

As of February 2011, Barneys no longer sold Prada (with the exception of shoes and menswear) because of disagreements concerning prices and inventory control. Prada wanted to lease space, but control its own inventory and markdowns under a concession model. Barneys declined.

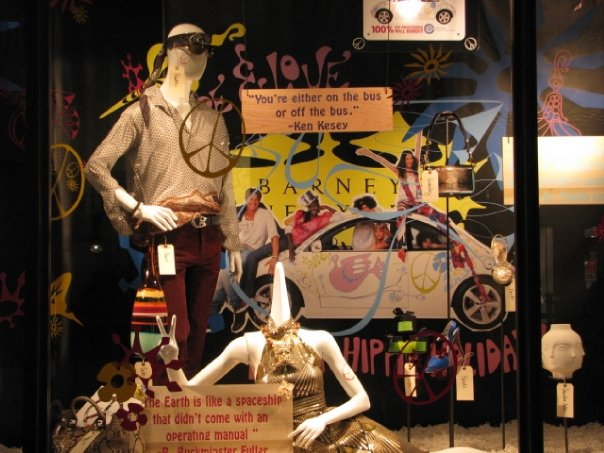
Barneys New York Window

In May 2012, Perry Capital acquired a majority ownership of the company, which reduced its $590 million debt to $50 million. It will have three seats on the seven-member board. The former majority owner Istithmar World as well as new investor Yucaipa Cos will also be on the board as will current executive chairman Mark Lee.

In December 2013, Women's Wear Daily announced that the retailer would return to the portion of its original Seventh Avenue site being vacated by bankrupt Loehmann's. In January 2014, Barneys announced that it would feature transgender models in its upcoming advertisement campaign.

In February 2016, Barneys New York returned to its original Seventh Avenue location in Chelsea opening a four-story flagship store. Daniella Vitale was named chief executive officer, succeeding Lee, in February 2017.

==== 2019 bankruptcy ====
On August 6, 2019, Barneys New York filed for bankruptcy once more. 15 of the 22 stores closed as part of the bankruptcy filing, including Barneys locations in Las Vegas, Boston, Chicago, Seattle, Los Angeles, New York, and Philadelphia; and all but two of its outlet stores.

On October 25, 2019, Authentic Brands Group announced it had bought the company for $271.4 million (~$337 million in 2025). Authentic Brands Group has said it would close all remaining Barneys stores and license the retailer's intellectual property to Saks Fifth Avenue. Barneys brick-and-mortar format was eliminated, taking with it the last seven locations (five stores and two warehouses). The New York Times reported that Authentic Brands Group's strategy is "essentially betting that the future of retail lies with abstract values." When ABG acquired Barneys it confirmed that ABG's partnership with Seven & I Holdings in Japan would remain intact.

=== 2021–present ===
On Friday, January 15, 2021, Saks Fifth Avenue unveiled a 54,000-square-foot (5,000 m^{2}) space on the fifth floor of its flagship in New York, titled Barneys at Saks. The partnership is aimed at continuing Barneys New York tradition of unearthing and promoting emerging designers.

On Monday, January 25, 2021, Saks Fifth Avenue unveiled the first standalone Barneys at Saks store at a 14,000-square-foot (1,300 m^{2}) location in Greenwich, Connecticut.

In 2022, Authentic Brands Group launched Barneys New York Beauty, a beauty brand consisting of skincare, personal care and fragrances. It first launched with a four-product skin care collection consisting of a cleanser, a serum, a day cream and a night cream. It is under licence with the Gloent Group.

In April 2023, Seven & I Holdings sold their stake in Barneys New York (Japan) to Laox Holdings. Laox has plans to improve Barneys Japan sales and expand the chain around Asia.

The company became part of the Authentic Luxury Group in October 2024, it is a joint-venture luxury retail group created by Authentic Brands Group and Saks Global. There are currently plans to expand the brand into different categories including clothing and home goods. In late 2024, a boutique hotel called Barneys New York Residences, comprising 10 individual units, opened in Tulum, Mexico.

Following the bankruptcy of Saks Global in January 2026, Saks Fifth Avenue's rights to Barneys retailing in the United States were released and the two Barneys at Saks locations were closed. In April 2026, it was revealed that a small-format Barneys store is planned to open in Naples, Florida in 2027. WWD announced that ABG is planning to revive the Barneys store on Madison Avenue and is searching for an operator for the store.

== Stores ==
As of 2026, five full-line and four outlet stores operate across Japan, a beauty and fragrance store operates in Seoul, South Korea. Beauty and fragrance counters operate within department stores and hotels across Japan and South Korea (including at Barneys stores in Japan).

Prior to its sale to Authentic Brands, Barneys New York operated 22 locations, including 12 Barney's Warehouse off-price stores. Its flagship department stores were located in Las Vegas, Boston, Chicago, San Francisco, Seattle, Los Angeles, New York, and Philadelphia. Freds restaurants operated inside of the Beverly Hills, Chicago, Madison Avenue, Seventh Avenue, and San Francisco locations. After Authentic Brands Group purchased the company for $271.4 million, all stores were announced to shutter.

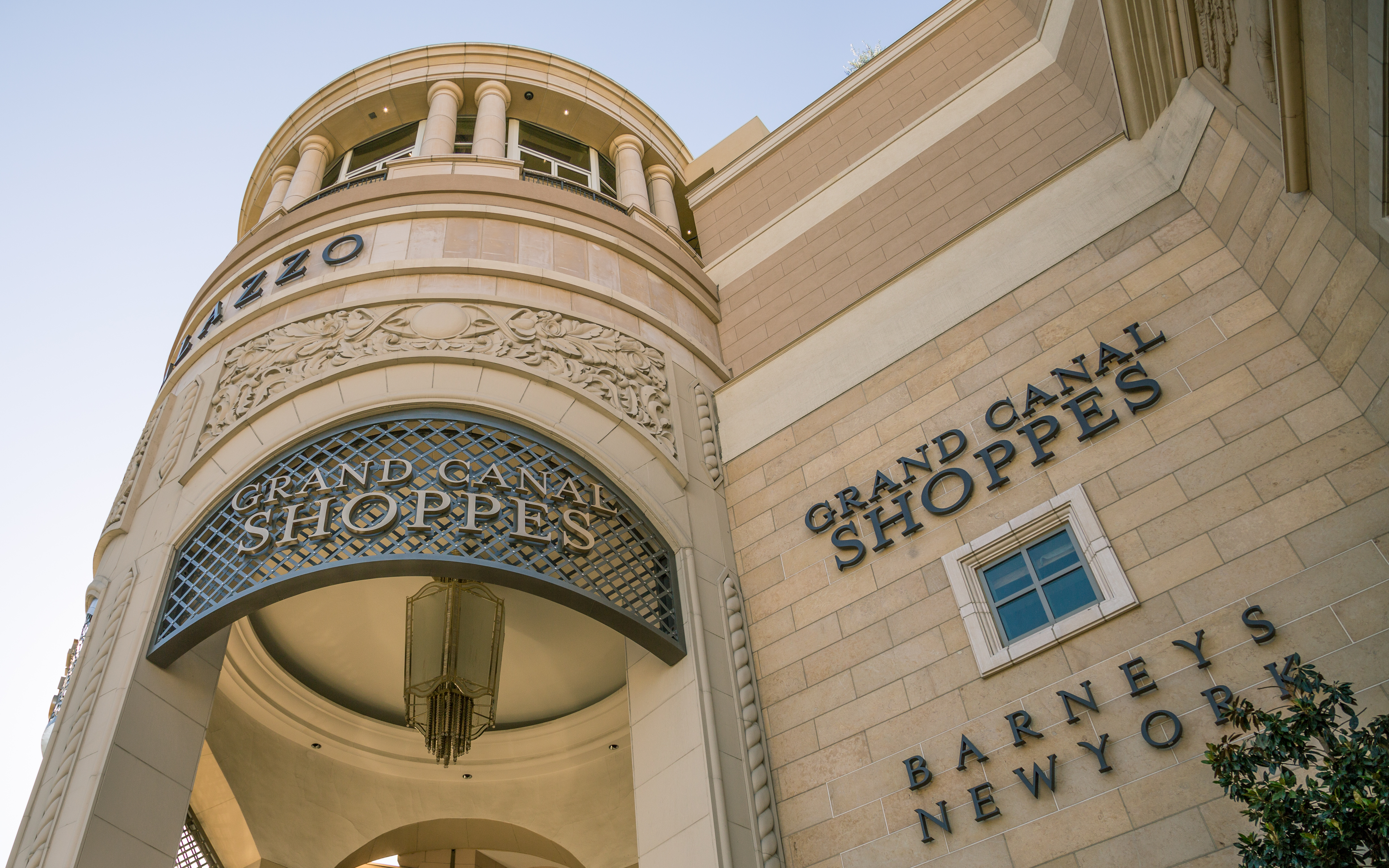
Barney's previous flagship at the Grand Canal Shoppes

In 2014, the company announced plans for a flagship department store at Bal Harbour Shops in Bal Harbour, Florida as part of a planned expansion of that shopping center. The 53,000-square-foot (4,900 m^{2}) store was to open in 2023 with the new portions of the center. The company opened a freestanding men's store in San Francisco in February 2016, and in summer 2018 announced it would add a restaurant. On March 12, 2019, Barneys announced a new location at the American Dream shopping and entertainment complex in New Jersey, the only location in the state of New Jersey.

In January 2021, Saks Fifth Avenue unveiled a 54,000-square-foot (5,000 m^{2}) space on the fifth floor of its flagship in New York, and unveiled the first standalone Barneys at Saks Fifth Avenue store at a 14,000-square-foot (1,300 m^{2}) location in Greenwich, Connecticut. Both locations were closed in early 2026.

A pop-up store operated from September to October 2024 in New York City in collaboration with Hourglass.

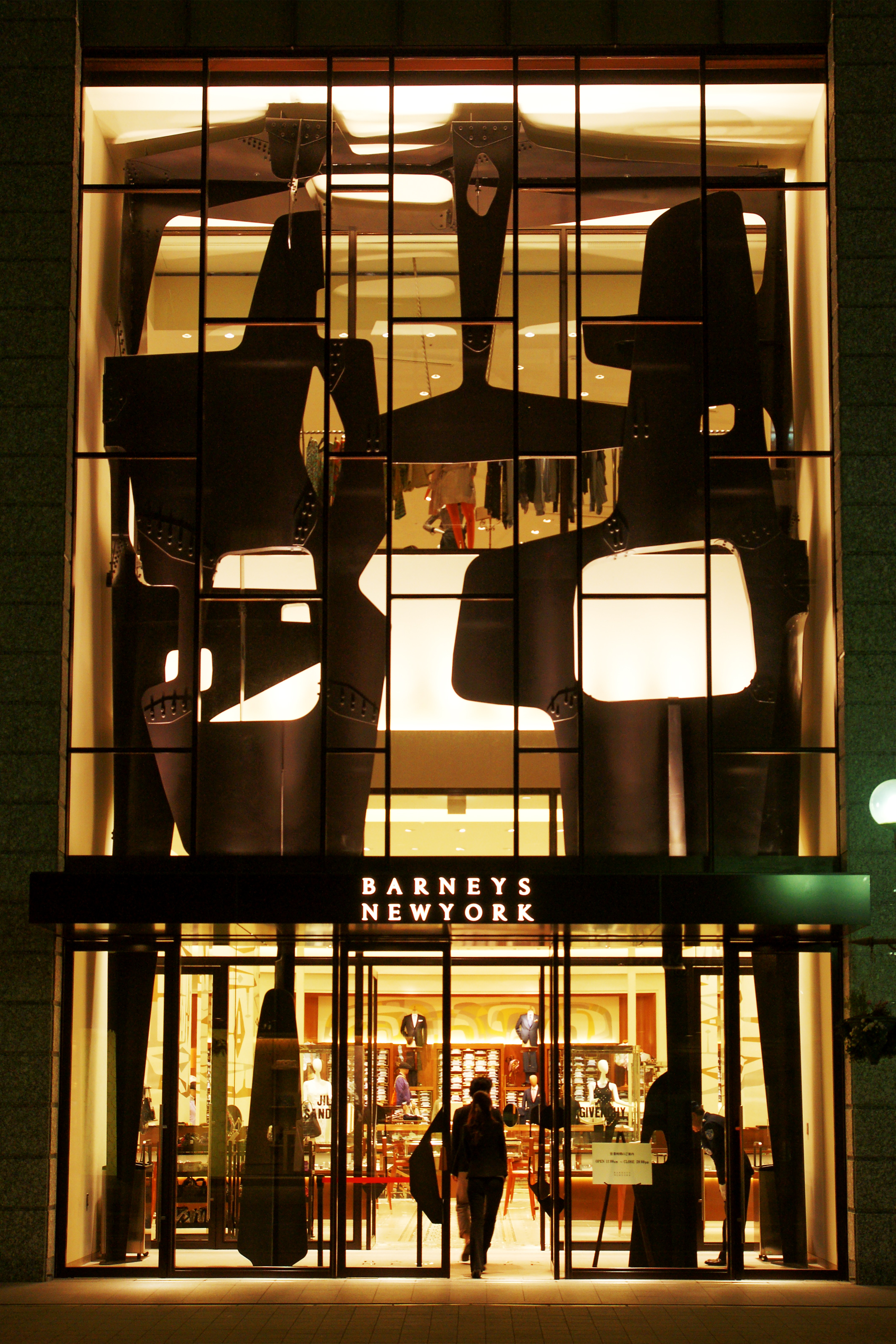
Barneys New York in Kobe, Japan (2010)

=== Barneys New York CO-OP ===
Established in 1986, the Barneys New York CO-OP originally existed as the contemporary department within Barneys flagship stores. Created to house trendier and less expensive product than the rest of the store, the CO-OP was aimed at younger shoppers with smaller budgets than a traditional Barneys customer. The CO-OP department was spun-off into a separate chain of stores in the 2000s, primarily located in shopping malls and lifestyle centers. At its height, there were more than 20 CO-OP stores throughout the United States.

In 2013, Barneys retired the CO-OP name. Several CO-OPs were converted into boutique versions of the flagship Barneys New York brand.

== Controversies ==
=== Use of "Co-op" in name ===
The 2010 opening of the Brooklyn, New York CO-OP location raised some concerns among members of the Park Slope Food Coop regarding the use of the term "co-op" by a for-profit corporation. According to the general manager of the Food Coop, Barneys's use of the term is a violation of the New York State Cooperative Corporations Law.

=== Racial profiling ===
In 2013, Trayon Christian, a 19-year-old African American, purchased a $350 (~$484.00 in 2025) Ferragamo belt and was arrested shortly after leaving the store. The police had received a call from the store claiming that the debit card used was fraudulent, even though the customer provided proper identification at the time of the purchase. The officers questioned Christian on how he was able to afford the purchased belt, and accused him of using a fraudulent card. He was handcuffed, detained in a holding cell for two hours and interrogated further. He was later released after the police contacted Chase Bank to verify ownership of the card.

Another African American shopper, Kayla Phillips, came forward with a similar claim after she purchased a $2,500 Céline handbag with her debit card. Both shoppers believe they were targeted because of their race after they purchased costly items and have stated they intend on filing discrimination lawsuits against the store.

As a result of these high-profile cases, Al Sharpton threatened to boycott the store in October 2013. Sharpton compared Barneys practice of racial profiling to the controversial stop-and-frisk policy practiced by the NYPD. Within days of Sharpton's boycott announcement, fans petitioned rapper and businessman Jay-Z to sever ties with the retailer with whom he had a partnership. Jay-Z responded saying that he would look into the matter more thoroughly rather than make a snap judgment stating, "I move and speak based on facts and not emotion." In November 2013, Jay-Z stated that his deal with Barneys would continue as planned, with the condition that he be placed in a leadership role on a committee specifically organized to deal with racial profiling in the store. Other conditions required that all of the proceeds of the BNY SCC collection be donated to Jay-Z's charity, the Shawn Carter Scholarship Foundation. This was a major increase from the 25% of the proceeds that was initially agreed upon. As well, Barneys agreed to donate 10% of all retail of all stores nationwide as well as its web store, Barneys.com, on November 20, 2013, which would guarantee a total of at least one million dollars.

=== Live butterfly display ===
In 2018, Barneys used live butterflies to introduce a new line of jewelry and accessories, asking customers and employees to interact with monarch butterflies as they flitted around display cases in the Beverly Hills store. PETA reported "that there were many dead and dying butterflies languishing around the display area, behind plants and in plant beds." Barneys responded by banning the use of live butterflies from any future promotions and making a donation to PETA as an apology.

=== Labor issues ===
The union busting firm Kulture Consulting, LLC was hired in 2015. According to a Department of Labor document, Kulture "presented informational meetings to company employees relative to the process of unionization" at Barney's locations in Beverly Hills, Chicago, Las Vegas, and San Francisco. In Chicago representatives from the labor union Workers United reported that "management called workers into one-on-one meetings" and engaged in "scare tactics". In December 2018, Barneys hired Kulture Consulting to present "informational meetings" with employees at its Las Vegas location.

== See also ==
- Saks Fifth Avenue
- Bergdorf Goodman
- Neiman Marcus
- Hudson's Bay Company
