= Barney Pressman =

American businessman (1894–1991)

- Born: December 14, 1894; New York City, U.S.
- Died: August 24, 1991 (aged 96); Miami, Florida, U.S.
- Occupations: Retail executive and company founder
- Known for: founder of Barneys New York
- Spouse(s): Barbara Pressman (until her death); Isabel Pressman
- Children: Fred Pressman; Elizabeth Pressman (predeceased)
- Family: Robert Pressman (grandson); Gene Pressman (grandson); Louise Sunshine (granddaughter); Stephanie Pressman (great great niece)

Barney Pressman (December 14, 1894 – August 24, 1991) was an American businessman and founder of Barneys New York retail store.

== Early life ==
Pressman was born on December 14, 1894, in New York City, to a Jewish family, the son of an owner of a clothing store. He was one of seven children and was raised on the Lower East Side of Manhattan.

== Career ==
In 1923, he purchased the lease and contents of a small clothing store at Seventh Avenue and 17th Street in Manhattan selling his wife's wedding ring to finance the transaction. As his store was located in a non-traditional retail area, Pressman purchased inventory at a discount at bankruptcies, auctions, and in odd lots including searching the newspapers for notices of death and divorce among the city's elite. By buying name-brand goods at a discount, he was able to severely undercut the manufacturer's selling price and although he did not have the most desired styles, his working class customers preferred brand name products for low prices. His success incurred the wrath of the manufacturers who pressured local suppliers to limit sales to Pressman; Pressman circumvented their efforts and started to purchase excess inventory from independent retailers in the South, where the New York manufacturers had less influence.

Pressman was known for aggressive sales promotions including "No Bunk, No Junk, No Imitation" and "Calling all men to Barneys" (mimicking Dick Tracy) as well as the heavy use of radio advertising to attract customers to his out-of-the-way location. As he could not afford prime-time radio advertising, he would sponsor programs featuring Irish music (reflective of his clientele) and radio broadcasts of the Lindbergh baby kidnapping trial. In the 1950s, Barneys sold more suits than any other single store in the world, employing 150 tailors. In the 1960s, his son Fred changed the focus of the business and starting advertising to customers who were not as price sensitive and began to carry expensive suits and coats. He changed the name to Barneys New York. Pressman retired in 1975, but remained active in the business. In 1977, Barneys added women's apparel, housewares, cosmetics, and gifts. By the time of his death in 1991, Barney's had $200 million in sales. In January 1996, Barneys filed for bankruptcy protection after a dispute with its Japanese lender.

== Personal life ==
Pressman was married twice. His first wife, Barbara, died in 1972; they had two children: Elizabeth (died 1971) and Fred who took over Barney's in 1975. His grandsons were both in the family business: Robert Pressman, was responsible for the financial side of the business; and his grandson Gene Pressman, was responsible for merchandising. His second wife was Isabel Pressman. In 1991, funeral services were held at the Central Synagogue in Manhattan. His granddaughter, Louise Sunshine, is the co-founder of the real estate marketing and sales company Sunshine Group. In 2025, his grandson Gene published They All Came to Barneys, a memoir about him.
