= Maine High School =

Maine High School may refer to schools in Illinois:

- Maine North High School, Des Plaines, opened in 1970 and closed in 1981
- Maine South High School, Park Ridge
- Maine East High School, Park Ridge
- Maine West High School, Park Ridge
