= Mutter =

Mutter may refer to:

== Arts and entertainment ==
- Mutter (album), a 2001 album by Rammstein
  - "Mutter" (song), a song by Rammstein
- The Mother (play) or Die Mutter, a play by Bertolt Brecht

== Other uses ==
- Mutter (software), a window manager initially for X Window System, which became a Wayland compositor
- Mutter (surname)
- Mutters, a municipality near Innsbruck, Austria
- Mütter Museum, a medical museum in Philadelphia, Pennsylvania, US

== See also ==
- Mutterstadt, a municipality in Germany
