= Ladendorf (surname) =

Landerdorf is a surname. Notable people with the surname include:

- Ernst Ladendorf (born 1992), South African rugby union player
- Nicholas Ladendorf, former write-in candidate for U.S. Congress
- Tyler Ladendorf (born 1988), American baseball player
