= Central Suburban League =

Chicago high school sports league

- Conference: IHSA
- Founded: 1965
- No. of teams: 12
- Region: North Shore suburbs of Chicago, Illinois
- Website: Official website

The Central Suburban League is an IHSA-recognized high school extracurricular conference comprising 12 public schools located in the North Shore suburbs of Chicago. Comprising 12 relatively large high schools, it is among the larger high school conferences (by student population) in Illinois.

Current locations of Central Suburban League Schools

== Schools ==
School	Town	Team name	Colors	IHSA Classes 2/3/4	Reference	County
Deerfield High School	Deerfield	Warriors		AA/3A/4A		Lake
Evanston Township High School	Evanston	Wildkits		AA/3A/4A		Cook
Glenbrook North High School	Northbrook	Spartans		AA/3A/4A		Cook
Glenbrook South High School	Glenview	Titans		AA/3A/4A		Cook
Highland Park High School	Highland Park	Giants		AA/3A/4A		Lake
Maine East High School	Park Ridge	Demons		AA/3A/4A		Cook
Maine South High School	Park Ridge	Hawks		AA/3A/4A		Cook
Maine West High School	Des Plaines	Warriors		AA/3A/4A		Cook
New Trier High School	Winnetka	Trevians		AA/3A/4A		Cook
Niles North High School	Skokie	Vikings		AA/3A/4A		Cook
Niles West High School	Skokie	Wolves		AA/3A/4A		Cook
Vernon Hills High School	Vernon Hills	Cougars		AA/2A/3A		Lake

=== Former schools ===
- Niles East High School: Opened in 1938, the school was Niles High School until 1959 when Niles West opened. The school closed in 1980.
- Maine North High School: Opened in 1970, the building closed in 1981.
- New Trier West High School: New Trier was split into a west and east campus in 1967. Between 1967 and 1981 the west campus was a normal high school of its own. In 1981, due to a decline in the school's population, the west campus was turned into a freshman only campus (1981-1985). The west campus closed in 1985. Once again in 2001, District 203 decided to open it as a freshman campus. It still operates, and is known as the Northfield Campus.
- Waukegan West High School: Between 1975 and 1990, Waukegan split into a west and east campus. Starting in 1990, the west campus folded into the east campus.
- Waukegan High School: Waukegan, members of the CSL between 1975 and 2016, left the conference after 41 seasons to join the revamped North Suburban Conference. Waukegan competed in the CSL South while in the conference.

== Divisional alignment ==
While the divisions' names are geographic, their makeup is not based on a school's location. The North Division originally included the schools with the smaller enrollments while the South Division includes the schools with the larger enrollments. Every two years the member school's official enrollment was used to determine division alignment. Beginning during the 2016-17 realignment, the conference changed its policy to reassess division alignment every three years. Realignments are now determined based on athletic success in their division, with the most athletically successful team in the North switching with the least successful team in the South.

North Division	South Division
Niles North	Evanston
Maine West	Glenbrook South
Highland Park	Maine South
Maine East	New Trier
Deerfield	Niles West
Vernon Hills	Glenbrook North

Not all activities and sports make use of the division alignment. In chess, teams compete as a part of the North Suburban Chess League which comprises schools from many conferences. Scholastic Bowl plays as a single twelve team league.

Niles North moved to the CSL South for the 2016-'17 season after former South Division school Waukegan was replaced with Vernon Hills. Vernon Hills, which had the smallest enrollment in the conference at that point, was placed in the North Division.

In the 2019-2020 season, Glenbrook North and Niles North swapped divisions because of a division realignment.

In the 2023-2024 season, Deerfield and Niles West swapped divisions because of a division realignment.

In the 2026-2027 season, Deerfield and Niles West swapped back to their previous division alignment.

== History ==
The CSL traces its history back to the founding of the Suburban League in 1913, of which Evanston and New Trier were both founding members. The league had somewhat fluid membership over several decades. As the population of suburban Chicago grew (and the number of high schools with it) schools began leaving to join newer conferences such as the West Suburban Conference (started 1922), the Northwest Suburban (started in 1925, which later became the North Suburban Conference and Mid-Suburban League), and the South Suburban League (started in 1950). With more schools leaving (and newer suburban schools joining more geographically logical conferences), the Central Suburban League was founded in 1965, the last major conference to be carved from the old Suburban League. The last remaining bastion of the Suburban League started joining these other leagues, and finally folded after the 1974–1975 school year.

As of the end of the 2007–08 school year, the past and present schools of the CSL have won 233 state titles in various IHSA sports and activities. They have finished in second place 261 times. Nearly half of these (105 state titles and 113 state runners-up) have been won by New Trier (or the two schools it was split into for a time, New Trier East and New Trier West). Evanston adds 47 state titles and 49 runner-up prizes. The league has remained stable (except for divisional realignment) since Niles North returned to the league in 1991.

During Winter 2016, the CSL Athletic Directors voted 7-5 for a division realignment system. The system incorporates enrollment and athletic success in determining division placement. Every three years, points are tallied and the top six teams are placed in the South Division, while the other six are in the North Division. Before 2016, divisions were determined only by enrollment. Glenbrook North and Niles North were the first schools to swap divisions in the 2019-2020 season.

=== Timeline ===
- 1965 – CSL is formed by Deerfield, Glenbrook North, Glenbrook South, Maine South, Niles North, and Niles West.
- 1967 – Maine West joins the league, as does the newly opened New Trier West.
- 1971 – Maine North joins.
- 1972 – Highland Park and Niles East both join from the Suburban League. Maine East joins from the West Suburban Conference. This is the first year there are two divisions in the conference.
- 1974 – Maine North moves out of conference.
- 1975 – With the Suburban League now folded, Evanston, New Trier East, Waukegan East, and Waukegan West join.
- 1979 – Niles North leaves the league.
- 1980 – Niles East closes.
- 1981 – New Trier East and West consolidate into New Trier Township High School.
- 1990 – Waukegan East and West consolidate into Waukegan High School.
- 1991 – Niles North rejoins the league.
- 2016 – Waukegan leaves the conference; Vernon Hills joins in their place.

== Notable athletes in major sports (since 1965) ==
- Dave Bergman (Maine South) was a Major League Baseball first baseman who played for the 1984 World Series champion Detroit Tigers.
- Dave Butz (Maine South) was an NFL defensive lineman (1973–88) and member of the NFL 1980s All-Decade Team. He was a starter for the Washington Redskins championship teams in Super Bowls XVII & XXII
- Chris Collins (Glenbrook North) was a Duke basketball player and is currently the head men's basketball coach at Northwestern University.
- Tony Cogan (Highland Park) was a Major League Baseball pitcher for the Kansas City Royals.
- Bart Conner (Niles West) was an Olympic gold medal winning gymnast at the 1984 Summer Olympics.
- Jim Hart (Niles West) was an NFL quarterback (1966-1984) for the football St. Louis Cardinals (now Arizona Cardinals) and Washington Redskins.
- Bryan Jurewicz (Deerfield) was a star defensive lineman for the Wisconsin Badgers NCAA football team, and set a record in 1996 for most deflected passes .
- Lindsay Knapp (Deerfield) was an NFL lineman for the Kansas City Chiefs & Green Bay Packers (Super Bowl XXXI champions).
- Jason Kipnis (Glenbrook North), second baseman for the Chicago Cubs
- George Kontos (Niles West) is a Major League Baseball relief pitcher for the San Francisco Giants.
- Jim Lindeman (Maine West) is a former Major League Baseball player (1986–93).
- Christina Loukas (Deerfield) is a 2008 and 2012 US Olympic team member in diving. She was the first female diver in Illinois to score over 500 points in state competition, and won multiple Big Ten championships.
- Jewell Loyd (Niles West) is a basketball player in the WNBA.
- Rashard Mendenhall (Niles West) was an NFL running back for the Pittsburgh Steelers (Super Bowl XLIII champion) and Arizona Cardinals.
- Pat Misch (Glenbrook North) was an MLB pitcher from 2007-11 for the San Francisco Giants and New York Mets. He spent the 2016 playing in Japan.
- Aaron Moorehead (Deerfield) is an NFL wide receiver and member of the Super Bowl XLI Champion Indianapolis Colts.
- Abdel Nader (Niles North) is an NBA player drafted by the Boston Celtics in 2016. Currently playing for the Oklahoma City Thunder.
- Doug Rader (Glenbrook North) was an MLB player (1967–77) for three teams and an MLB manager for the Texas Rangers, Chicago White Sox and California Angels.
- Adam Rosales (Maine South) is a major league baseball third baseman who plays for the Oakland Athletics.
- Scott Sanderson (Glenbrook North) was a Major League Baseball pitcher who won 163 games and pitched for seven teams over 19 seasons from 1978 to 1996, including the Chicago Cubs and Chicago White Sox.
- Jon Scheyer (Glenbrook North), All American captain of Duke University national champion basketball team, and current Duke head men's basketball coach.
- Olivia Smoliga (Glenbrook South) Swimmer - 2016 Olympic Gold Medalist in the 4X100m Medley Relay. Holds the world record for the most gold medals won at a single FINA World Championships by an individual swimmer.
- Jim Walewander (Maine South) was a Major League Baseball player, playing most of his career for the Detroit Tigers. was a Major League Baseball outfielder (1978–79), playing his entire career for the Kansas City Royals.
