= WMTH =

- Park Ridge, Illinois; United States
- Frequency: 90.5 MHz

Programming
- Format: High School

Ownership
- Owner: Maine Township High School District 207; (BOARD OF EDUCATION, MAINE TWP. #207)

History
- First air date: December 20, 1959
- Former frequencies: 88.5 MHz
- Call sign meaning: Maine Township High

Technical information
- Licensing authority: FCC
- Facility ID: 6050
- Class: D
- ERP: 10 watts
- HAAT: 31 meters (102 ft)
- Transmitter coordinates: 42°02′14″N 87°51′30″W

Links
- Public license information: Public file; LMS
- Webcast: Listen live

WMTH-FM, located in Park Ridge, Illinois, was among the first FM high school radio stations in the United States when it was licensed in 1959. Established by the Student Council at Maine Township High School, now Maine East High School, the station went on the air during December 1959. The station became known as "The Voice of Maine Township".

The radio station was built by electronics teacher, Theron Whitfield, and electronics students in the school.

WMTH-FM has studios at all three existing Maine Township High Schools. Maine West High School in Des Plaines and Maine East High School and Maine South High School in Park Ridge. There was also a studio at the former Maine North High School in Des Plaines.

Maine East, South, and West currently broadcast from about 8:30 AM - 5 PM on Weekdays, with East broadcasting on Mondays, South on Tuesdays, West on Wednesdays, and the schools rotating Thursday and Friday every week.

The call letters were chosen "MTH" as in Maine Township High (school), though the YouTube page for WMTH-TV also says “We Make Things Happen.” The WMTH-FM antenna is located on the highest point of the school building at Dempster and Potter Roads in Park Ridge. The studio from 1959 through 1970 was located in room 147B, across the hall from the auditorium. When the center courtyard building opened in the fall of 1970, the radio station relocated and the first WMTH-TV television studio was built.

The original power of the station was 16 watts effective radiated power at a frequency of 88.5 MHz. This continued from 1960 until 1983 when the frequency was changed to 90.5 MHz and the power reduced to 10 watts to prevent interference with WNIU and WRTW on the same frequency. This leaves it as one of the lowest powered FM stations in the United States, and one of few remaining under the now-discontinued Class D license.

WMTH-TV is another section of WMTH, they broadcast a mixture of school news, school sports events, and other programs of local interest. All of the broadcast events are streamed on their respective YouTube channels. In addition, all events broadcast are staffed by WMTH Club Members and the broadcasts are in care of their respective instructors.

== Famous alumni ==
- Harrison Ford (1960) Actor and film producer
- Marshall Seese (1960) TV Weather meteorologist on The Weather Channel (retired 2008)
- Steve Goodman (1963) Musician and composer
- Rich Koz (1970) Svengoolie Chicago and Me TV TV celebrity
- Michael Walcher (1970) TV News anchor, reporter
- Joseph Passarella (1972) Broadcasting Executive, Voice-over artist
- Scott Cohn (1978) CNBC TV journalist
- Janet Shamlian (1980) national correspondent NBC News
- David Santrella (1980) Broadcast executive
- Andy Masur (1985) Sports broadcaster
- Countless others are at television stations, radio station, cable-TV, and satellite radio stations
