= Tri-M =

American high school and middle school music honor society

- Founded: 1936; 90 years ago Maine Township High School (Now called Maine East High School)
- Type: Honor
- Affiliation: National Association for Music Education
- Status: Active
- Emphasis: Music, secondary school
- Scope: International
- Member badge: Junior badge
- Chapters: 2,100
- Members: 84,000 active
- Former name: Maine Music Masters (1936-1952); Modern Music Masters (1952-1983)
- Headquarters: P.O. Box 70704; Philadelphia, Pennsylvania 19176-0704; United States
- Website: www.musichonors.com

Tri-M Music Honor Society, formerly known as Modern Music Masters, is an American high school and middle school music honor society. Tri-M was founded in 1936 by high school band director Alexander Harley in Park Ridge, Illinois. The society became a program of the National Association for Music Education in 1983. It has more than 2,100 participating chapters in several countries.

== History ==
=== Maine Music Masters ===
In 1930, Charles Himmel, principal of Maine Township High School (now Maine Township High School East) in Park Ridge, Illinois tasked the school's new music department chairman and band director, Alexander M. Harley, with turning the high school into the music center for the community. Harley established student vocal and instrumental ensembles to perform free concerts for community churches, civic clubs, and schools. To recognize his students for volunteering their time, Harley looked for a national secondary school music honor society; however, he learned that no such organization existed.

In 1936, Harley and his wife Frances formed the local honor society Maine Music Masters and initiated its first members. Harley drafted the society's bylaws and constitution, established criteria for musical achievement, academic achievement, and service to school, church, and community.

=== Modern Music Masters ===
In 1951, Maine Township High School superintendent Harry D. Anderson attended the initiation of Tri-M and felt the organization could have broad appeal to other high schools in Illinois and the United States. He urged Harley to incorporate and expand the society.

The society was incorporated as Modern Music Masters on January 3, 1952. Einar J. Anderson, director of the Maine Township Adult Evening School, joined Harley as an incorporator and financially supported the group for its first three years. The organization's executive secretary was Frances Harley, who was also a music teacher and director of four choirs. The society was operated from the Harley's home.

At the end of 1952, 34 schools had applied to charter a chapter. The group began using the nickname Tri-M in 1954. After adding chapters in Illinois, Harley and his wife traversed the country to start chapters. By 1972, it had 125,000 members in chapters in the United States, Asia, and Europe. In 1979, the society's headquarters finally moved from the Harley's basement.

In 2025, Tri-M has 84,000 active members in high schools, junior high schools, and middle schools.

=== Tri-M Music Honor Society ===
On August 1, 1983, the Modern Music Masters officially became a program of the Music Educators National Conference (now the National Association for Music Education) and changed its name to Tri-M Music Honor Society. Tri-M continues to recognize students for their academic and musical achievements and provides leadership and service opportunities to young musicians. In 1986, Tri-M became an approved program of the National Association of Secondary School Principals.

"Music Masters, Hail to Thee"
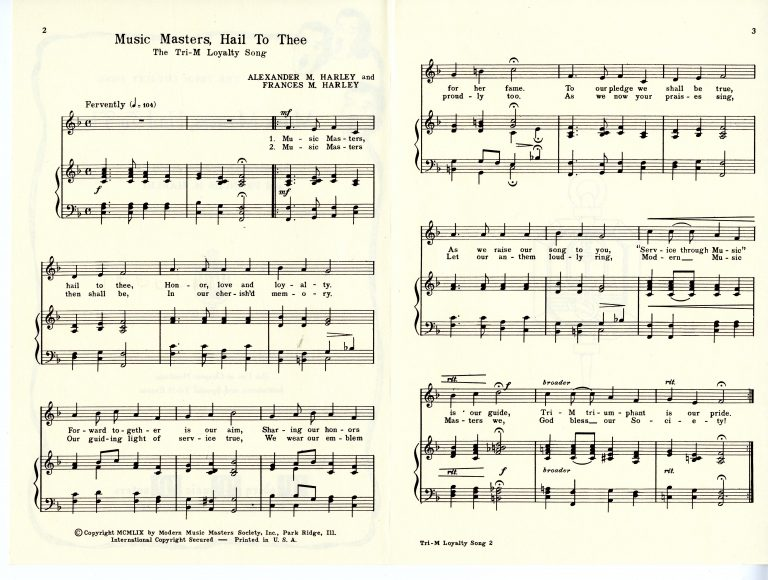
- "Music Masters, Hail to Thee" Sheet music
- "Music Masters, Hail to Thee"

== Symbols ==
The society's original emblem was an octagonal key, featuring a five-line music staff with a lyre and scroll on the staff. The five-lines of the staff represented the society's selection criteria of music, scholarship, character, leadership, and service. The lyre and scroll symbolized proficiency and service to music. Above the staff was a musical triplet in the shape of the letter M, an abbreviation of Maine Music Masters.

Tri-M's song is "Music Masters, Hail to Thee".

== Membership ==
Membership in Tri-M is open to students in grades six through twelve. To be eligible for membership, a student must maintain an A average in their music classes, a B average in all of their academic courses, be presently enrolled in a music course at their school or belong to a school-sponsored ensemble, and be recommended for membership by their school's music faculty.

In addition to its student (active) members, Tri-M also has alumni members who have graduated from high school, and honorary members.

== Chapters ==
Tri-M has more than 2,100 chapters in public, private, and parochial schools. Chapters are located in Canada, Chile, China, Egypt, Japan, Mexico, Pakistan, Peru, the Philippines, South Korea, Taiwan, Thailand, the United Kingdom, and the United States. Chapters are divided by grade into senior chapters for grades 10 through 12 and junior chapters for grades 6 through eight; grade 9 can be either senior or junior, depending on the school's structure.

== Notable members ==
- Arthur Fiedler (honorary), conductor
- Howard Hanson (honorary), composer and music theorist
- Bobby McFerrin (honorary), singer and conductor
- Georg Solti (honorary), conductor
- Shinichi Suzuki (honorary), violinist and pioneer in musical pedagogy
- Fred Waring (honorary), musician, bandleader, choral director, and radio and television personality
- Meredith Willson (honorary), composer, conductor, musical arranger, and bandleader
