= Scott Mutter =

American photographer (1944–2008)

Charles Scott Mutter
- Born: January 14, 1944; Chicago, Illinois
- Died: March 5, 2008
- Education: Masters degrees in fine art and Chinese studies
- Occupation: Photographer
- Known for: Photomontage
- Website: https://www.scottmutter.com

Charles Scott Mutter (January 14, 1944 – March 5, 2008) was an American photographer best known for his photomontages. His photos were shown in galleries and printed on a wide variety of media, from posters to mouse pads.

== Early life ==
Mutter was the second of three children of Charles and Lucille Mutter, who lived in the Woodlawn area of South Side, Chicago. The family moved to suburban Park Ridge, Illinois, where he graduated from Maine East High School in Park Ridge in 1961. Mutter received a B.A. in history from the University of Illinois at Urbana-Champaign in 1966 and two master's degrees, in fine arts and Chinese studies. While at university he was part of the counter culture, or hippie culture. He protested against the Vietnam War at the 1968 Democratic Convention in Chicago. He lived in Champaign into the early 1980s where he ran an antiques shop and showed classic and foreign movies in rented halls such as the McKinley Foundation or the Red Herring.

He had no formal art training.

== Career ==
Untitled (Library), c.1980, showing Michigan Avenue superimposed on the University of Illinois card catalogue

Most of Mutter's work was done with images of and around the Chicago area, with some of his earlier pieces incorporating scenes from Urbana-Champaign and the University of Illinois. Mutter was never comfortable with being considered a surrealist, and coined the term "surrational images" to describe his work.

His first show was at the downtown Chicago bookstore Brentano's in the mid-1970s. He then published calendars and posters through several publishing houses, including Avalanche Publishing. His best known work, Surrational Images, was published by the University of Illinois Press in 1992.

Some of his most famous works include a montage of fans using flashlights to illuminate Wrigley Field, which was then known for not having lights or night games; a photo of Michigan Avenue skyscrapers superimposed upon an image of the card catalogue at the University of Illinois Library; and a forest growing out of a parquet floor.

Mutter never transitioned to the cut and paste technique afforded by Photoshop and similar software but recreated every original print in the darkroom as he thought this was the only way that they were truly "originals". From the few existing originals of each piece he would select the one he considered the most appropriate for reproduction as posters.

He was found dead in his home in March 2008, age 64; his death was ruled a suicide. He experienced depression for much of his adult life, and had cardiovascular problems.

== Artistic philosophy ==
Sergei Eisenstein, a Russian filmmaker (1898–1948) and author of two books, The Film Sense and Film Form: Essays in Film Theory, greatly influenced Mutter's ideas about photographic "montage", a technique of combining and superimposing images into a single picture. Mutter believed "there are theoretical reasons why a montage works or is something. But you have to also understand and keep your mind open to the fact that what works, works. That's the bottom line." His images were an attempt to represent something that is reality, not physical but rather a representation through metaphor.

== Exhibitions ==
His work has been exhibited at the San Francisco International Airport and at the opening of the Beam Performing Arts Center in Tokyo. His photographs have appeared in magazines and newspapers including the Chicago Tribune, Herbert's, Japanese Avenue, and Print Magazine. His photos have been critiqued and viewed in many public schools across the country.

== Bibliography ==
- Surrational Images: Photomontages, 1992. University of Illinois Press. Foreword by Martin Krause. (ISBN 0-252-01935-0)
