= Bob Abrahamian =

Chicago soul music DJ, historian, and archivist (1978–2014)

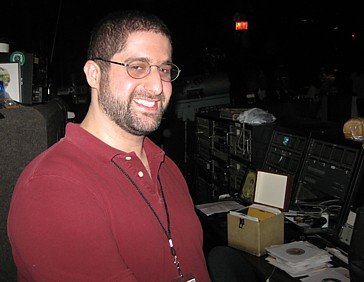
- Chicago Soul historian and DJ Bob Abrahamian
- Born: Robert V. Abrahamian; September 25, 1978
- Died: June 5, 2014 (aged 35); Chicago, Illinois
- Education: University of Chicago (B.S. Computer Science and media studies)
- Years active: 1995-2014
- Known for: Soul music deejay, archivist, and historian
- Website: sittinginthepark.com

Bob Abrahamian (September 25, 1978 – June 5, 2014) was a soul music deejay, historian, archivist, and record collector. In addition to hosting a long-running radio show, "Sitting in the Park" on WHPK, he built a personal collection of significant soul music records, with a focus on the Chicago vocal style known as "sweet soul." He conducted recorded interviews with dozens of musicians, many of whom had fallen into obscurity. Abrahamian contributed liner notes to archival soul reissues, as well as providing materials and assistance for releases on the Chicago-based Numero Group record label. He graduated from Maine Township High School East in Park Ridge, Illinois and received an undergraduate degree from the University of Chicago in computer science and media studies. Abrahamian's 2009 interview with Larry Blasingaine resulted in the discovery of the Jackson 5's previously unknown first recording session at Chicago's One-derful Records.

Bob Abrahamian had a long history of clinical depression and committed suicide on June 5, 2014.
