= Tyler Ladendorf =

American baseball player (born 1988)

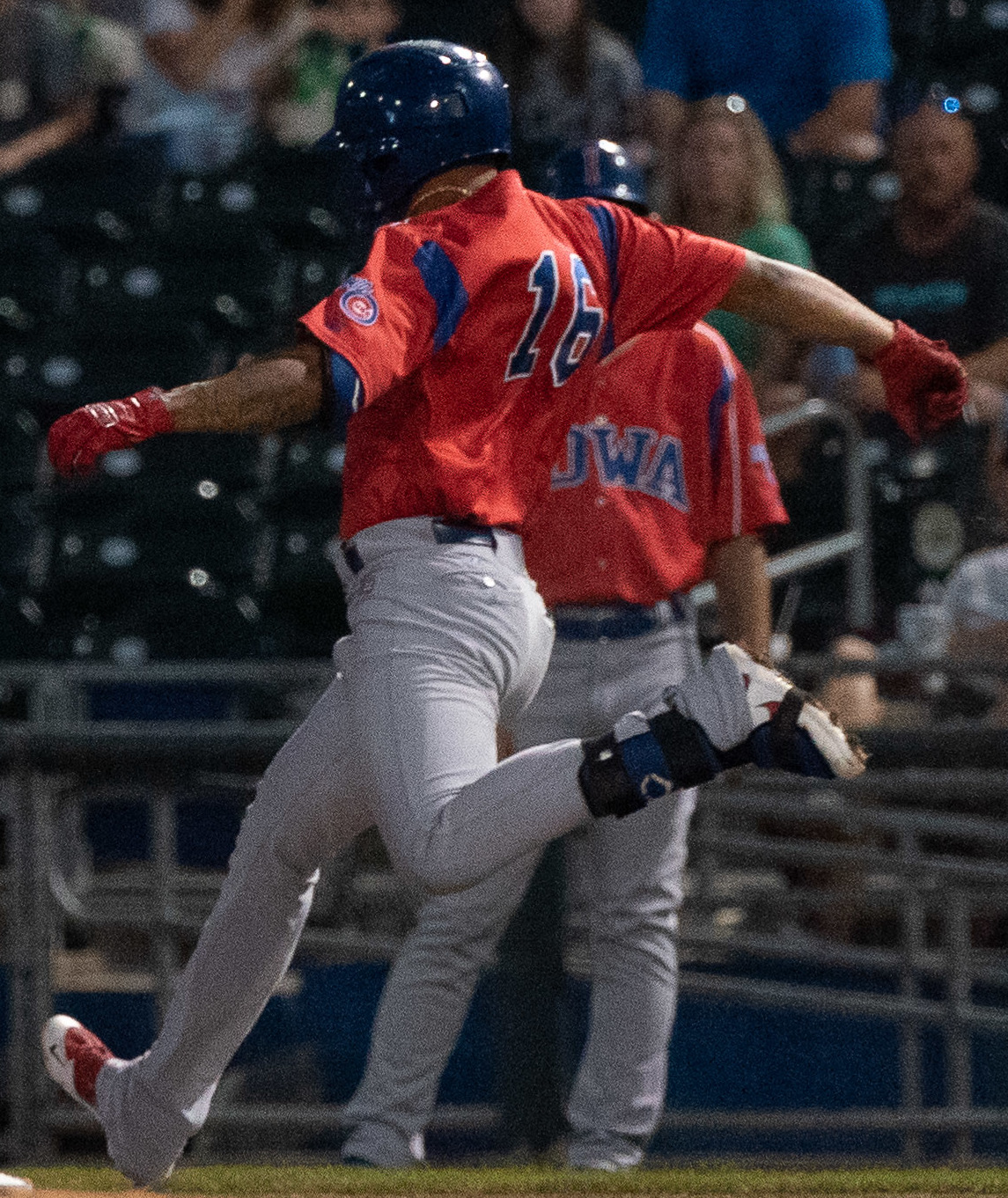
- Ladendorf with the Iowa Cubs in 2021
- Infielder / Outfielder
- Born: March 7, 1988 (age 38); Park Ridge, Illinois, U.S.
- Batted: Right Threw: Right

MLB debut
- April 8, 2015, for the Oakland Athletics

Last MLB appearance
- October 2, 2021, for the Chicago Cubs

MLB statistics
- Batting average: .121
- Home runs: 0
- Runs batted in: 3
- Stats at Baseball Reference

Teams
- Oakland Athletics (2015–2016); Chicago Cubs (2021)

Tyler James Ladendorf (born March 7, 1988) is an American former professional baseball second baseman. He played in Major League Baseball (MLB) for the Oakland Athletics and Chicago Cubs. He currently serves as a coach for the Durham Bulls in the Tampa Bay Rays organization.

== Career ==
=== Minnesota Twins ===
Ladendorf was originally drafted out of Maine West High School in Des Plaines, Illinois, by the New York Yankees in the 34th round of the 2006 Major League Baseball draft, but did not sign. A year later, San Francisco Giants drafted Ladendorf, again in the 34th round, and he again did not sign, opting instead to return to Howard College for another season. He signed with the Minnesota Twins after the club drafted him in the second round, #60 overall, in the 2008 Major League Baseball draft. He made his professional debut with the GCL Twins.

The 21-year-old infielder began the 2009 season with the rookie-level Elizabethton Twins and batted .410 with four home runs and 17 runs batted in before earning a promotion to the class A Beloit Snappers.

=== Oakland Athletics ===
On July 31, 2009, he was traded to the Athletics for veteran shortstop Orlando Cabrera. He was batting .233 with four RBIs in 15 games with Beloit at the time of the trade. He finished the year with the Single-A Kane County Cougars, notching 30 hits in 35 games for the club. He split the 2010 season between the Triple-A Sacramento River Cats and the High-A Stockton Ports, accumulating a .270/.323/.381 batting line with 5 home runs and 41 RBI between the two. The next year, he split the season between Sacramento and the Double-A Midland RockHounds, posting a .224/.306/.317 batting line with 6 home runs and 36 RBI. In 2012, he spent the season in Midland, slashing .240/.324/.358 with 9 home runs and 54 RBI in 104 games. He split the 2013 season between Sacramento and Midland, batting .248/.328/.374 with 6 home runs and 42 RBI. In 2014, Ladendorf spent the season in Sacramento, hitting .297/.376/.407 with 2 home runs and 43 RBI.

The Athletics added Ladendorf to their 40-man roster on October 31, 2014. He made the Athletics' Opening Day roster in 2015. Ladendorf made his debut on April 8, and hit a triple in his first at bat. Ladendorf appeared in only 9 games in 2015, collecting 4 hits in 17 at-bats.

In 2016, Ladendorf bounced between the Triple–A level and the majors, struggling to a .083 batting average in 50 plate appearances for Oakland. On October 6, 2016, Ladendorf was removed from the 40–man roster and sent outright to Triple–A Nashville. He elected free agency following the season on November 7.

=== Chicago White Sox ===
On February 26, 2017, Ladendorf signed a minor league deal with the Chicago White Sox. He spent the season with the Triple-A Charlotte Knights, posting a .250/.324/.350 batting line with 2 home runs and 21 RBI. He elected free agency following the season on November 6.

=== Toronto Blue Jays ===
On April 6, 2018, Ladendorf signed a minor league contract with the Toronto Blue Jays. He appeared in 2 games for the Triple-A Buffalo Bisons, going hitless in 6 at-bats.

=== Arizona Diamondbacks ===
On May 28, 2018, Ladendorf was traded to the Arizona Diamondbacks in exchange for cash considerations. He spent the remainder of the season split between the Double-A Jackson Generals and the Triple-A Reno Aces, notching 34 hits in 43 games between the two. He elected free agency following the season on November 2.

=== High Point Rockers ===
On April 4, 2019, Ladendorf signed with the High Point Rockers of the Atlantic League of Professional Baseball. He was named an Atlantic League All-Star for the 2019 season.

=== Tampa Bay Rays ===
On July 26, 2019, Ladendorf's contract was purchased by the Tampa Bay Rays and he was assigned to the Triple-A Durham Bulls. He was released on September 13, 2019.

=== High Point Rockers (second stint) ===
On September 14, 2019, Ladendorf re-signed with the High Point Rockers of the Atlantic League of Professional Baseball. In total he played in 87 games hitting .257/.334/.432 with 13 home runs, 44 RBIs and 12 stolen bases.

He later re-signed for the 2020 season.

=== Chicago Dogs ===
On July 3, 2020, Ladendorf was traded to the Chicago Dogs of the American Association. Ladendorf hit .223/.294/.461 with 13 home runs and 38 RBI in 55 games for Chicago.

=== Chicago Cubs ===
On March 2, 2021, Ladendorf signed with the High Point Rockers of the Atlantic League of Professional Baseball as a player/coach. On May 24, prior to the ALPB season, his contract was purchased by the Chicago Cubs organization and he was assigned to the Triple-A Iowa Cubs. He temporarily added to the team's roster as a COVID-19 replacement and was removed on October 18, 2021.

=== High Point Rockers (third stint) ===
On April 7, 2022, Ladendorf re-signed with the High Point Rockers of the Atlantic League of Professional Baseball. He played in 96 games for High Point, slashing .239/.304/.441 with 17 home runs, 49 RBI, and 10 stolen bases.

On December 20, 2022, Ladendorf announced his retirement from professional baseball.

== Coaching career ==
=== Chicago Cubs ===
On February 9, 2023, Ladendorf was hired by the Chicago Cubs organization to serve as a hitting coach for their Double-A affiliate, the Tennessee Smokies.

=== Tampa Bay Rays ===
On January 23, 2024, Ladendorf was hired by the Tampa Bay Rays to serve as the assistant hitting coach for their Triple–A affiliate, the Durham Bulls.

=== Colorado Rockies ===
In 2026, he was named as the hitting coach for the Spokane Indians the High-A affiliate of the Colorado Rockies.
