= Maine West High School =

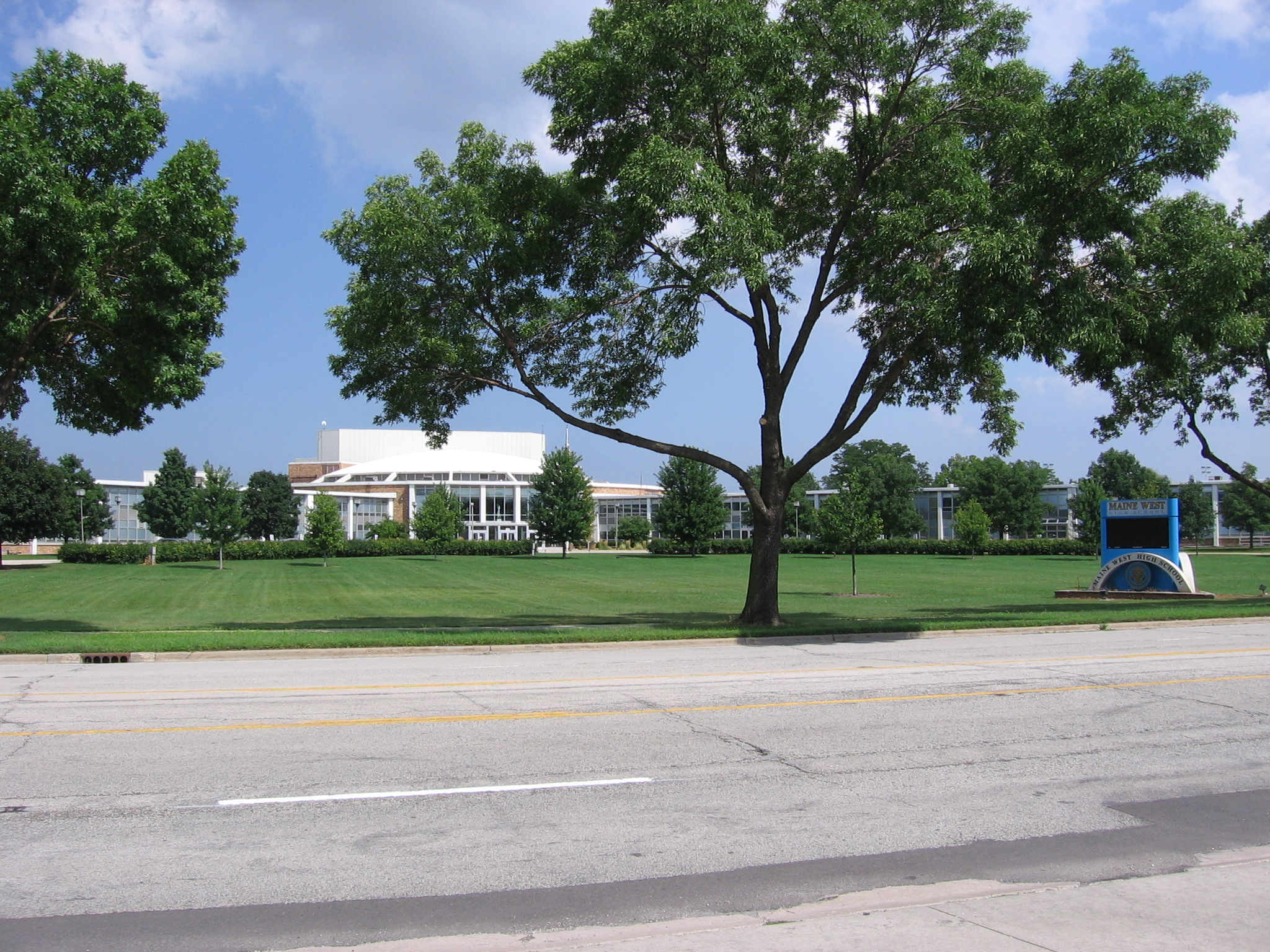

Location
- 1755 South Wolf Road; Des Plaines, Illinois 60018; United States; 42.021°N 87.907°W

Information
- School type: Public, secondary
- Opened: 1959
- School district: Maine Twp. H.S. 207
- NCES District ID: 1724090
- Superintendent: Dr. Tatiana Bonuma
- NCES School ID: 172409005032
- Principal: Dr. Eileen McMahon
- Teaching staff: 121.28 (FTE)
- Grades: 9-12
- Gender: coed
- Enrollment: 1,886 (2023-2024)
- Average class size: 22
- Student to teacher ratio: 15.55
- Campus type: Suburban
- Colors: Columbia blue gold white
- Athletics conference: Central Suburban League
- Team name: Warriors
- Publication: West Words
- Newspaper: Westerner
- Yearbook: Legend
- TV/radio station: WMTH
- Website: west.maine207.org

Maine West High School, also known as Maine West or MWHS, is a public four-year high school located in Des Plaines, Illinois, a northwest suburb of Chicago, Illinois, in the United States. It is part of Maine Township High School District 207, which also includes Maine East High School and Maine South High School. Maine Township High School West serves most of Des Plaines and a portion of Rosemont.

== History ==
In 1957, with the population of the district predicted to rise, the school district leadership purchased 73 acres (300,000 m^{2}) of land which had been the location of two truck farms.

While the school was designed to be home to 3,000 students, there was concern about the environment being too large. Thus, the school's design was made with a central core, and three classroom wings, each of which would be its own separate school.

While opened in time for the start of the 1959–60 school year, the school was formally dedicated on November 8, 1959.

In May 1972, Maine West hosted the Men's Gymnastics Olympic Trials, which was televised on ABC Sports and hosted by Keith Jackson. The Maine West Men's Gymnastics Team acted as the hosts, assisting to make this event a success for Maine West.

In 1974, Maine West won a contest to have Kiss play at their school. On November 2, 1974, Kiss played in Maine West's auditorium.

On October 31, 1980, five days before the 1980 presidential election, Ronald Reagan appeared at Maine West with actors Cesar Romero and Robert Conrad, giving a 30-minute address to the students and other invited guests.

== Academics ==
In 2008, Maine West had an average composite ACT score of 21.7, and graduated 92.9% of its senior class. Maine West has not made Adequate Yearly Progress on the Prairie State Achievements Examination, which with the ACT comprise the assessment tools used to fulfill the mandates of the federal No Child Left Behind Act. While the overall school did achieve their AYP, two student subgroups did not meet minimal requirements in reading.

In 2002, Maine West was the only school in District 207 and one of only 50 nationwide to receive U.S. News & World Report's Award as an "Outstanding High School." The school was recognized in the local media and with a plaque. This award recognizes schools where performance of students exiting compared to entering high schools exceeds expectations. Maine West received its third such award—the most in District 207—from U.S. News in 2018 with Maine West ranked 27th and Maine East 46th among the state's 670 public high school. In 2008, District 207 applied for and received nearly $1,000,000 from the Department of Education through the Teaching American History grant for U.S. History. All three schools and seven partner districts participate in the program coordinated at Maine West and the Chicago Metro History Education Center. The Teaching American History Grant was extended and received funding for two additional years in August 2011.

The school offers 16 Advanced Placement courses: English Language, English Literature, Biology, Chemistry, Physics (C), Calculus (BC), U.S. History, Statistics, Computer Science (AB), Spanish Language, Spanish Literature, European History, Micro/Macro Economics, Music Theory, Psychology, and Studio Art.

The school offers the opportunity to study five foreign languages: French, German, Italian, Mandarin Chinese, and Spanish. As of 2010, Maine West does not offer Chinese on campus, but a student has the option to take the class at Maine South in the morning if they would so choose to do so.

== Athletics ==
Maine West competes in the Central Suburban League. They also compete in state championship series tournaments sponsored by the Illinois High School Association (IHSA).

The school sponsors interscholastic competition for men and women in basketball, cross country, golf, lacrosse, soccer, swimming & diving, tennis, fencing, track & field, volleyball, water polo. Men also may compete in baseball, football and wrestling. Women may compete in badminton, gymnastics, and softball.

The following teams won their respective IHSA sponsored state championship tournament or meet:

- Badminton (girls): 1982–83
- Baseball: 1962–63
- Basketball (girls): 1987–88, 2018–19

Of special note are the 65 consecutive wins by the girls basketball team which encompassed the entire 1987–88 season, and lasted until February 13, 1989. As of 2010, this remains the record (including State Series playoff games) for girls teams in Illinois, and second among boys and girls basketball teams in the state.

The IHSA also recognizes that Maine West is the caretaker of all records posted by the now closed Maine North High School, though that school did not finish high enough in any sport or activity to warrant mention.

While not sponsored by the IHSA, Maine West is one of fewer than ten schools in Illinois to compete in varsity fencing. Maine West competes in the Great Lakes High School Fencing Conference which also includes teams from Wisconsin and Indiana. The Maine West girls team won the Conference Championship each year from 1981 through 1986. The boys won the Conference Title in 1989.

Lacrosse is also being added to the list of sports offered at Maine West.

== Notable alumni ==
- Adrian Fulle (class of 1990) is a director and writer of films such as Love 101.
- James Kahn (class of 1965), physician, author and screenwriter.
- Tyler Ladendorf, baseball player for Oakland Athletics
- Jim Lindeman is a former Major League Baseball player who played in the World Series with the St. Louis Cardinals.
- Jeff Daniel Phillips played one of the cavemen in a series of Geico television commercials.
- Dean Starkey (class of 1985) 1997 World Championships Pole-vault bronze medalist.
- Jason DeRusha (class of 1993) former WCCO-TV anchor and current WCCO (AM) talk show host.
- Angela Dugalić (class of 2020) was a Power forward for the Serbian national team that won the gold medal at the Eurobasket 2021.
