= Mutter (surname) =

Mutter is a surname. Notable people with the surname include:

- Anne-Sophie Mutter (born 1963), German violinist
- Carol Mutter, U.S. Marine lieutenant general
- Edda Mutter (born 1970), German alpine skier
- George Muter, early chief justice of Kentucky
- Peter Mutter, Canadian lawn bowler
- Robert Mutter, American politician
- Scott Mutter, American photographer
- Stefan Mutter, Swiss cyclist
