= Maine Township High School District 207 =

School district in Illinois, United States

Location
- 1177 South Dee Road; Park Ridge, Illinois United States
- Coordinates: 41.999093°N 87.854335°W

District information
- Type: public secondary
- Motto: Together we educate students to be informed, inquisitive, responsible, creative, and reasoning individuals.
- Grades: 9-12
- Established: 1902
- Superintendent: Dr. Tatania Bonuma
- Budget: $139.7 million (2010)
- NCES District ID: 1724090.

Students and staff
- Students: 6,370 (2017)
- Teachers: 399 (2017)
- Student–teacher ratio: 18 to 1 (2017)

Other information
- Website: http://www.maine207.org/

Maine Township High School District 207 is a school district based in Park Ridge, Illinois.

Composed of all of Park Ridge and most of Des Plaines, as well as portions of Glenview, Harwood Heights, Morton Grove, Niles, Norridge, Rosemont, and Norwood Park Township, the 36-square-mile (93 km^{2}) district lies approximately 14 miles Northwest of downtown Chicago. Primarily residential with some light industry, office developments and shopping centers, the district is adjacent to O'Hare International Airport and lies at the hub of rail and highway transportation (sections of I-90, I-190, and I-294 lie within the district boundaries). The district has earned many national awards including being named as one of the “Most Innovative School Districts” for its unique approaches to expand and support teacher learning and student success both during and after high school by AASA. In 2007, District 207 became Google’s first elementary and secondary school district Google Apps for Education partner. Maine North High School was also the setting for "The Breakfast Club" movie.

== Schools ==
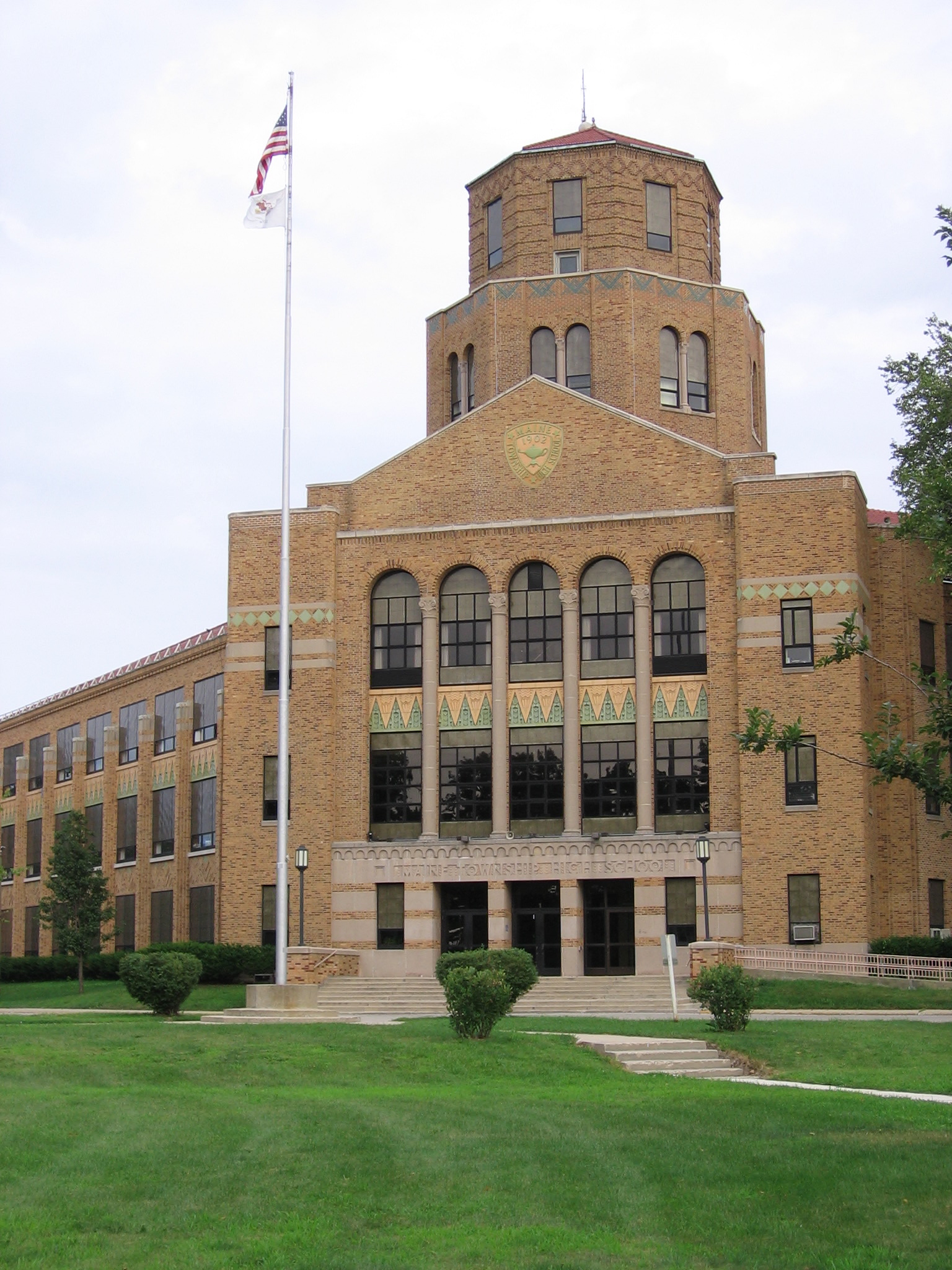
Maine East High School

- Maine East High School

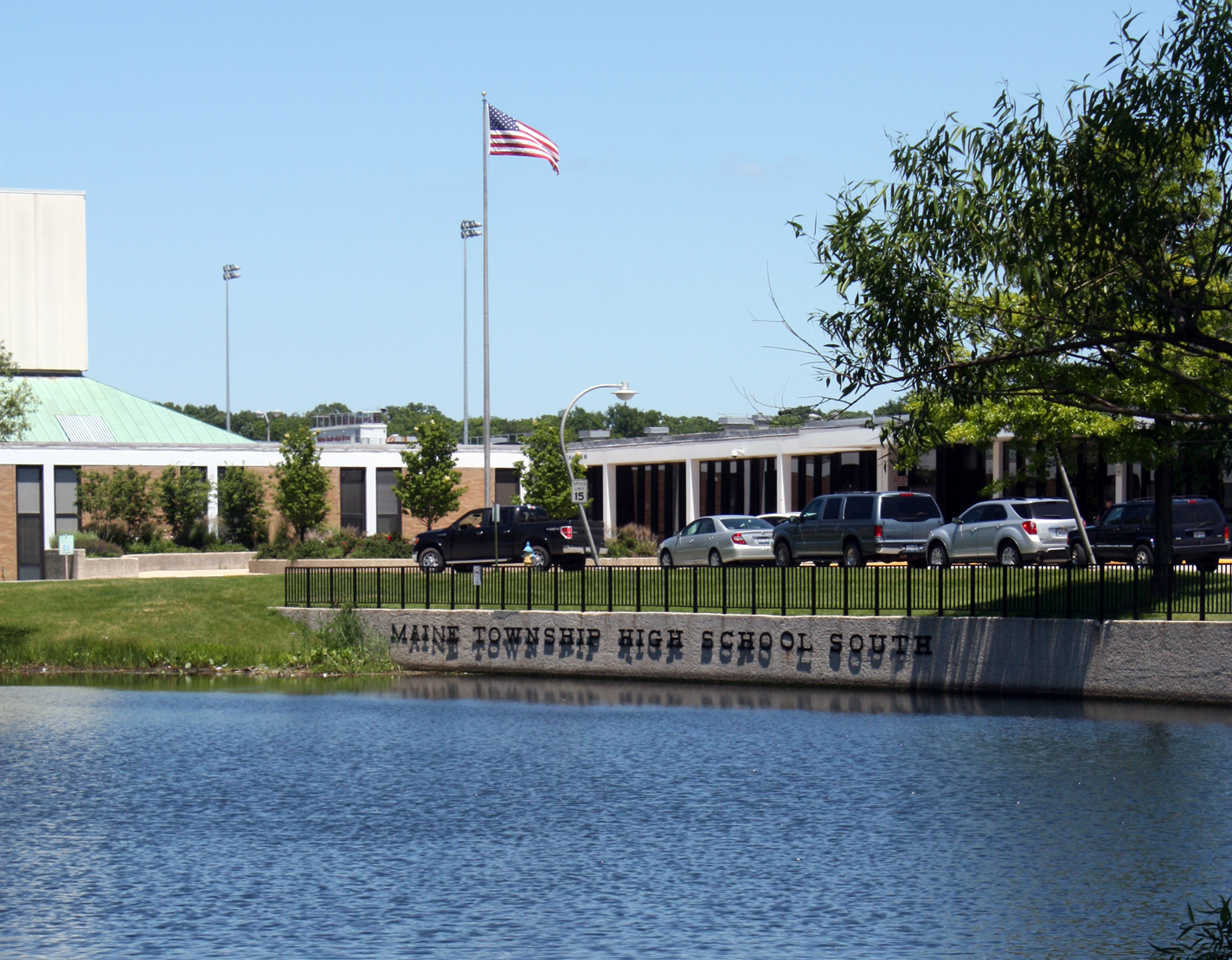
Maine South High School

- Maine South High School

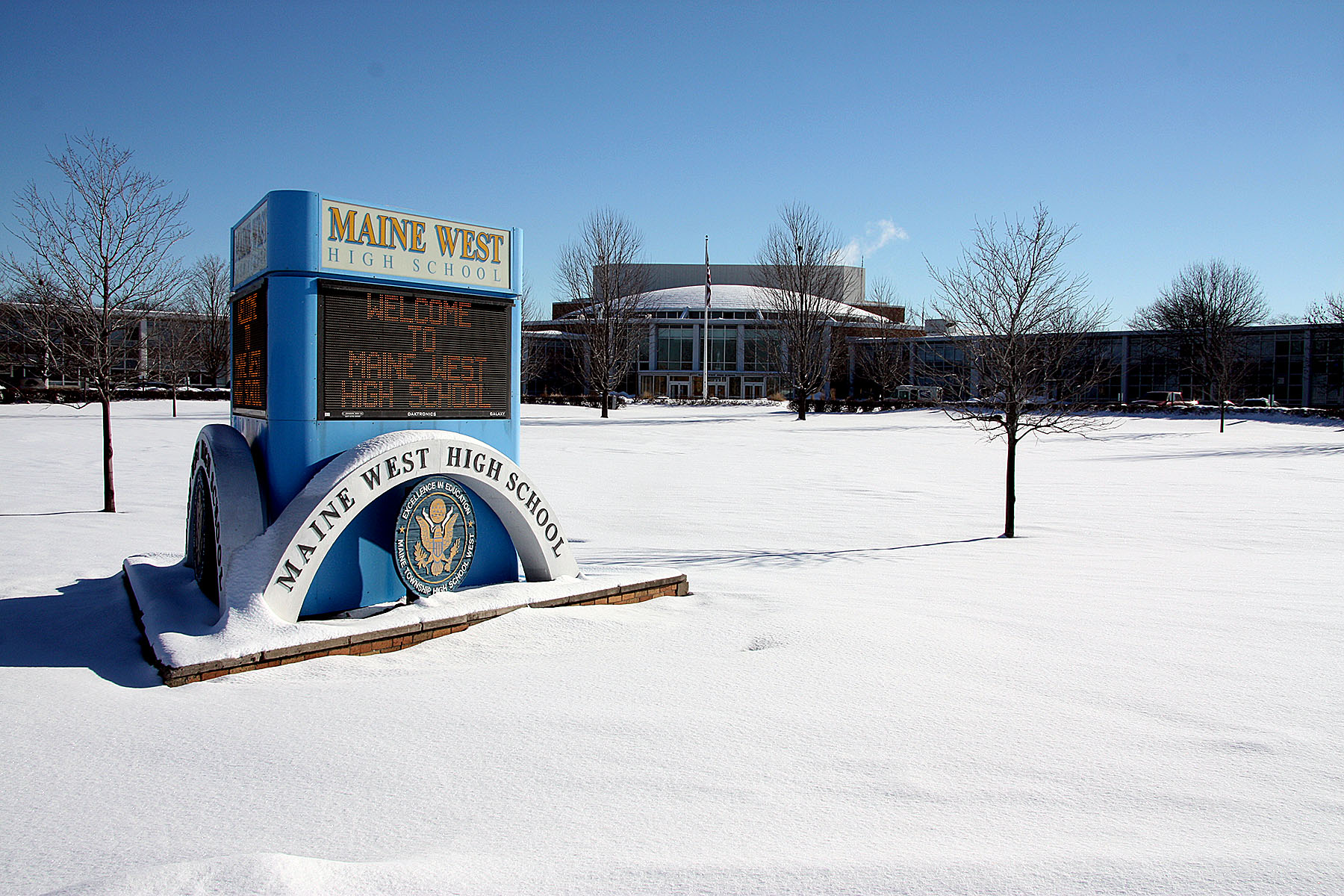
Maine West High School

- Maine West High School

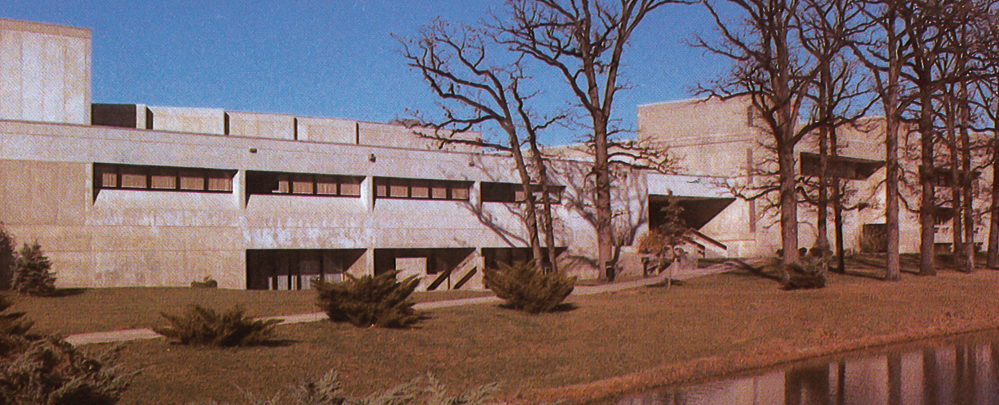
Maine North High School

- Maine North High School (1970–1981)

== Frost Academy ==
District 207 operates Frost Academy, an alternative placement for students who have not found success in a traditional school setting, and require a more structured environment. The program was formerly called ARC.

== Headquarters ==
The district administrative offices are located at 1177 S. Dee Road, Park Ridge, at the southwest corner of the property on which Maine South is located. This building was sold to the Tooling and Manufacturing Association of Chicago when the district offices were then moved into a section of Maine South. This section was refurbished to provide a boardroom for meetings, as well as offices for the superintendent, assistants and the business office.

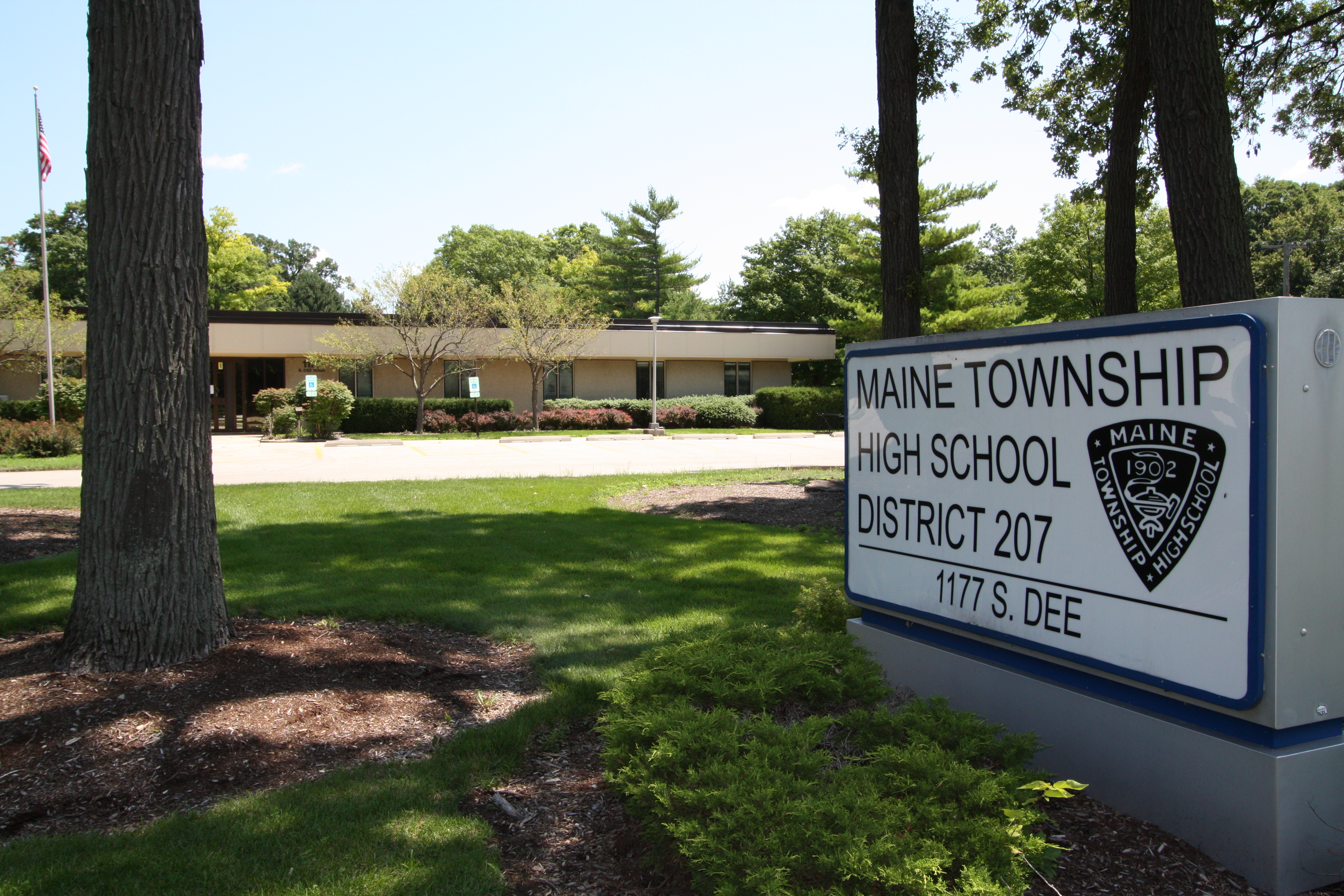
Administrative Center

In 2014, the district re-purchased the location at 1177 S. Dee Road where the district administrative offices and Frost Academy are now housed.

== Leadership ==
Maine Township High School District 207 is governed by a seven-member board of education. This board is the legislative, policy-setting authority of the school district and while the board is the hiring authority and approves all hiring (following recommendations by the Superintendent or their designee), the board's only direct employee is the superintendent of schools. The superintendent of schools is the executive authority of the school district.

The board undergoes an annual reorganization each April, where the board elects a president and vice president from among their number.

=== Board of education ===
Members of the board of education are elected to four year terms, with elections held in the Spring of odd-numbered years. Candidates must be 18 years old, a legal resident of the district for at least one year prior to the election, and must be a registered voter. School trustees and the school treasure for the township are specifically forbidden from running for the board. Board members cannot have any interest in any contract with the district, and are required to file an Economic Interest Statement each year for verification.

In odd-numbered years, the board elects a president, vice president, and secretary from among its members in the first meeting after the election. These positions are held for a period of one year. In even-numbered years, the election is held at the first meeting in the month of April.

=== Superintendent of Schools ===
The superintendent of schools for Maine Township High School District 207 is Dr. Tatiana Bonuma, who assumed those duties on July 1, 2024.

The superintendent is supported by four assistant superintendents; one in curriculum, one in business, one in technology and learning, and one in general administration who deals primarily with personnel.

== Wiemerslage vs. Maine Township High School District 207 ==
The district was a defendant in a federal court case, Wiemerslage vs. Maine Township High School District 207, 29 F.3d 1149, which helped reaffirm the doctrine of In loco parentis, the rights of schools to act in the place of parents in certain situations. The case involved a Maine South High School student who was suspended for loitering near a gate which gave access to school grounds from a neighborhood area. Students were permitted to use the gate to get to and from school, but were explicitly forbidden to loiter in the area due to complaints from neighbors about property damage and other problematic behavior.

The student and his family sued in 1993, citing violations of the First and Fourteenth Amendments to the United States Constitution. The district's motion to dismiss the case was granted by the United States District Court for the Northern District of Illinois. The United States Court of Appeals for the Seventh Circuit upheld the dismissal, holding that the school had acted "appropriately".

== 2010 budget cuts ==
The 2009–10 school year saw the need for a $15 million cut to the district's budget. The cuts included the dismissal of 75 teachers and 62 other staff members. According to district officials, the cause of the financial crisis was due to a "flat Consumer Price Index" which helps determine property values and the corresponding property taxes from which the school raises a large percentage of its monies. The problem was identified in July 2009 when the projected deficit spending of $3.8 million for the year was found to be $10.3 million; 2.7 times larger than anticipated. At a public meeting that drew more than 3,000 community members, a representative of the teachers' union claimed that the deficit spending was due to a lack of oversight from school officials.

== Passage of referendum for school upgrades ==
In the fall of 2018, voters living in the school district approved the passage of a $195 million bond issue with 61% of the votes. The money will be used to improve safety and security, replace outdated plumbing, electrical and mechanical systems, and update classrooms and labs at all three high schools to create flexible learning spaces that promote collaboration.
