= Maine East High School =

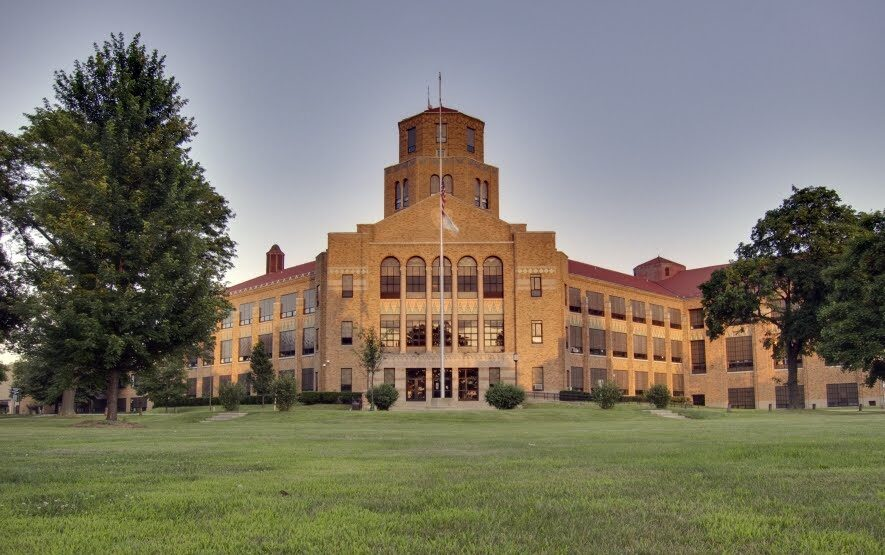

Location
- 2601 West Dempster Street; Park Ridge, Illinois 60068; United States; 42.038°N 87.858°W

Information
- School type: Public, secondary
- Established: 1929; 97 years ago
- School district: Maine Township High School District 207
- NCES District ID: 1724090
- Superintendent: Dr. Tatiana Bonuma
- NCES School ID: 172409005030
- Principal: Dr. Melissa Pikul
- Teaching staff: 124.50 (FTE)
- Grades: 9-12
- Gender: Co-educational
- Enrollment: 1,840 (2024-2025)
- Average class size: 20-30
- Student to teacher ratio: 14.52
- Campus size: 0.08 sq miles
- Area: 48.21 acres
- Campus type: Suburban
- Colors: Royal blue white
- Slogan: Respectful, Responsible, Resilient
- Song: Maine Pep
- Athletics conference: Central Suburban League
- Mascot: Blue Demon
- Nickname: Duke (The Blue Demon)
- Publication: Edge
- Newspaper: Pioneer
- Yearbook: Lens
- TV/radio station: WMTH-FM (90.5FM) and WMTH-TV https://en.wikipedia.org/wiki/WMTH
- Website: east.maine207.org

Maine East High School, or Maine East, and officially Maine Township High School East, is a public four-year high school located at the corner of Dempster Street and Potter Road in Park Ridge, Illinois, a northwest suburb of Chicago, in the United States. It is part of Maine Township High School District 207.

The building itself, constructed in the 1920s, is noted for its distinct Art Deco style.

== History ==
Maine East was known as Maine Township High School when it was built in 1929 as a replacement for the original Maine Township High School, which itself had been built in 1902. Until 1959, when Maine West High School was built, it was the only school in the district. The school was built with an indoor rifle shooting range and a swimming pool. Over the years, the shooting range was closed and the swimming pool closed with a larger modern pool opened in a new section of the building.

In the early 1920s, Maine Township became the first high school in Illinois to teach courses in automotive repair and telegraphy.

During the Great Depression, most of the staff taught without financial compensation, as the district could not afford to meet salaries. As thanks, local merchants provided necessities to the staff free of charge.

In 1936, Maine East's band director, Alexander Harley, along with his wife Frances, founded Maine Music Masters as a way of honoring musicians in the school band. The idea spread and, in 1952, the chapters at individual high schools were incorporated as Modern Music Masters. In 1983, it was renamed Tri-M Music Honor Society. Today, it is the largest international honor society in music education.

In December 1944 students at Maine Township High School combined forces with their teachers, school administrators, and community members to sell war bonds. The drive succeeded, raising $551,000. As a result of their efforts, the students were invited to a dedication ceremony at the local Douglas Aircraft plant, where C54 Skymaster cargo planes were built for the war. The students named one of the planes the “Maine Flyer” and came up with the motto, “Faster and Higher, That’s Maine’s Flyer.”

In December 1959, the student-operated radio station WMTH-FM went on the air. The first broadcast was of a basketball game in the school fieldhouse. The sportscaster students were Harrison Ford and Marshal Seese. Ford went on to become a major movie star and Marshall went on to be a weather-caster at The Weather Channel.

For a short amount of time, in 1958–1959, there were so many students enrolled in the school (approximately 7,000) that the school day was split into two parts so that half of the population attended in the morning and half in the afternoon. The largest graduating class was the class of 1970 with just under 1,100 students, just before the opening of Maine North High School. Prior to that, graduating classes of about 1,000 students were in 1959, just before Maine West High School opened, and the Class of 1964, just before Maine South High School opened. When Maine North High School closed in 1981, a majority of the students from that school were sent to Maine East, with the remainder being sent to Maine West High School and Glenbrook South High School.

== Building and grounds ==
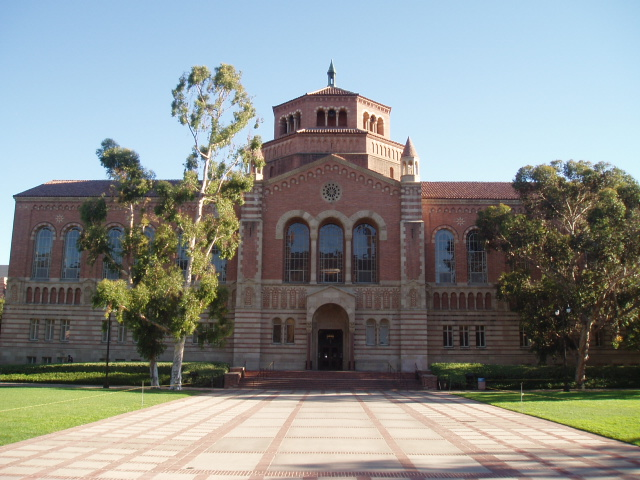
The Powell Library at UCLA. This building's architecture inspired the design of Maine East HS.

The architecture of the original building was inspired by the architecture of the Powell Library Building at UCLA. The original building was L-shaped, with a long wing running north–south, parallel to Potter Road. A shorter wing runs east–west, parallel to Dempster Street, with both wings meeting at "the tower" where the main entrance is located. Each of the wings is three stories tall.

The tower is six stories tall, though the higher floors are not in use today because of fire hazard (there is only one narrow staircase granting access to these floors). The fourth floor contains the new heating and air-conditioning systems. The "tower" originally housed the art and music rooms, but since 1960 houses the broadcasting transmitter for WMTH 90.5 FM, the student-operated radio station. Following World War II and up into the late 1960s aviation classes were given with the use of a Link Trainer installed in the tower. The sixth floor also has a balcony on the outside from which there is a distant view, on some days, of the Chicago skyline.

The school has two swimming pools. The newer one is used for physical education classes, and by the interscholastic water polo and swimming and diving teams. The original natatorium, located in the basement, has been shut down due to the need for financially unfeasible repairs, but is kept for its irreplaceable decorative mosaics, which could be damaged with further exposure to water and chemicals.

The school also has a firing range in the basement that was in use when the school opened, as training with firearms was considered essential for young men in the wake of World War I. The firing range was also used for World War II because many people wanted to join the military. Though today used for storage, it is believed to be one of the few non-military academies to still have a usable firing range on the premises.

On the American football / track and field field there is a memorial for Maine East World War II alumni behind the stadium.

Starting in 1988, the school's ecology club began a clean-up and restoration of a small section of the property which was native savanna. In addition to general clean-up, students began annual buck thorn cutting days. In addition to some endangered species, trees as old as 200 years were identified.

== Academics ==
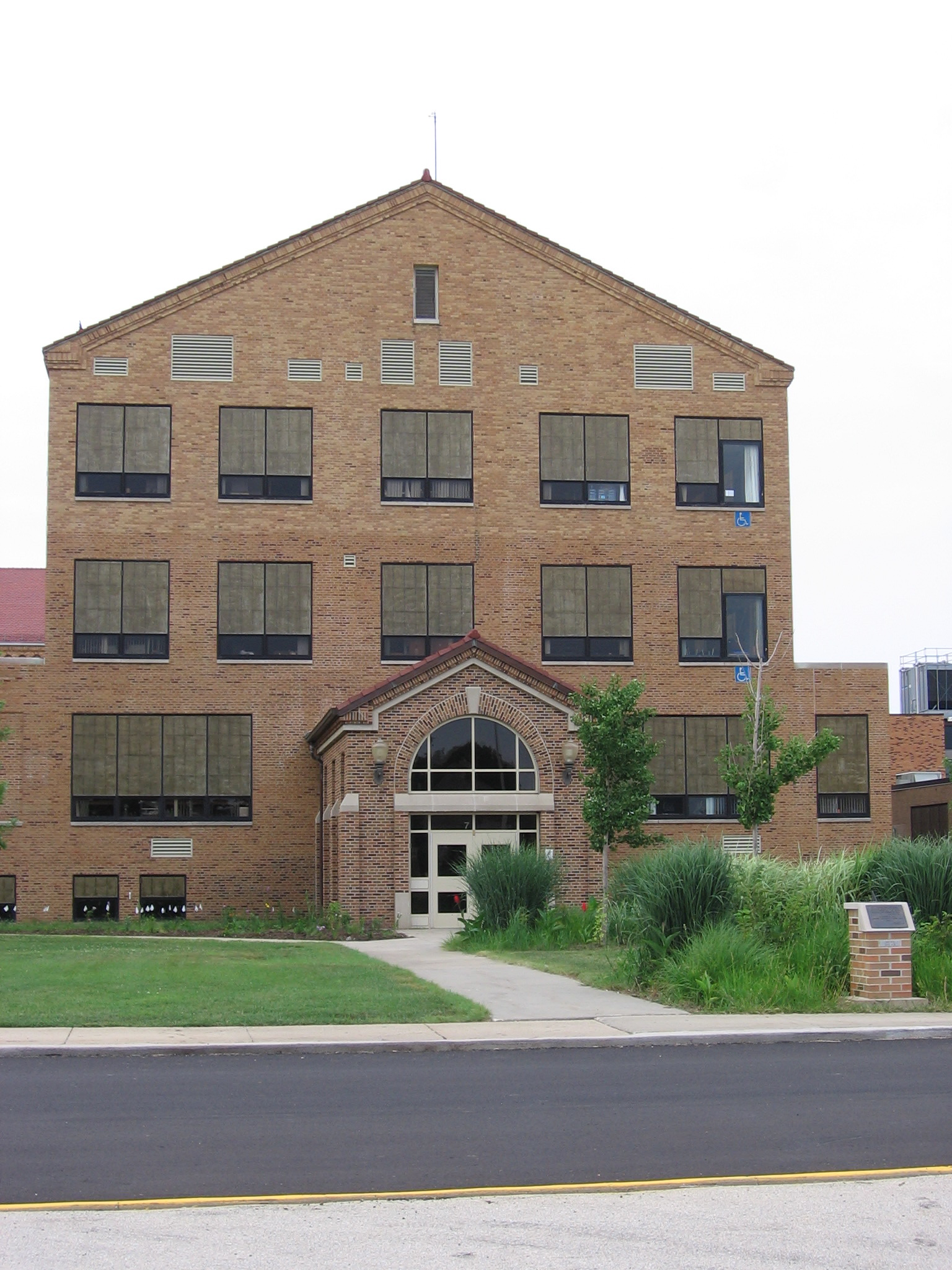
The rear entrance of the original building. The brick pedestal at lower right is topped by a sundial, dedicated to the school's science department.

The school offers 18 Advanced Placement courses: English language, English literature, biology, environmental science, chemistry, physics (C), calculus (AB & BC), statistics, computer science (AB), Spanish language, Spanish literature, U.S. history, European history, government and politics, economics, music theory and studio art.

Maine East has been ranked in the top 1,500 of America's public schools (based on the Challenge Index), as reported by Newsweek. In 2009, the school ranked #1,192 and in 2006 it ranked #1,181.

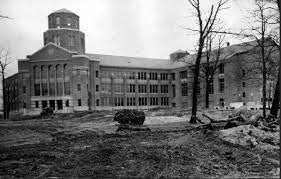
Maine East back in the 1940s with historic architecture

== Activities ==
Maine East High School is active in United States policy debate and hosts a tournament with regional significance to Great Lakes-region high school debaters, as those advancing far enough receive a bid to attend the national Tournament of Champions.

The following teams were placed in the top four of the IHSA sponsored State Championship Tournament of their respective competitive activity:

- Debate: State Champions (1971–72, 1979–80, 1980–81)
- Scholastic Bowl: 4th (1994–95)
- Speech Sweepstakes: 3rd (1971–72)

Maine East High School is also home to the Park Ridge Rotary Interact Club, founded in 2013. The Interact Club boasts a large amount of student involvement and has led major fundraising and community service initiatives. The Interact Club has conducted service projects on the local and international level. Its initiatives have received coverage by numerous media outlets. Its motto is "Service Above Self" and it allows students to develop leadership skills through service.

== Athletics ==
Maine East has competed in the Central Suburban League since 1972. Before then, the school competed in the West Suburban Conference. The school also competes in state championship tournament series sponsored by the Illinois High School Association (IHSA).

The school sponsors interscholastic teams for men and women in basketball, cross country, golf, gymnastics, soccer, swimming and diving, tennis, wrestling, track and field, volleyball and water polo. There are men's teams in baseball and American football. Women may compete in badminton, cheerleading, and softball.

The following teams were placed in the top four of the IHSA] sponsored State Championship Tournament of their respective sport. These also include IHSA recognized finishes by Maine Township High School prior to 1960:

- Baseball: State Champions (1957–58, 1958–59); 2nd (1948–49)
- Cross country (boys): State Champions (1970–71, 1979–80); 2nd place (1947–48); 3rd place (1950–51, 1969–70, 1971–72); 4th place (1955–56)
- Golf (boys): 2nd place (1949–50)
- Gymnastics (boys): State Champions (1978–79); 2nd place (1967–68, 1979–80); 3rd place (1966–67)
- Gymnastics (girls): State Champions (1976–77); 2nd place (1979–80); 3rd place (1977–78); 4th place (1978–79 & 1980–81)
- Soccer (boys): 2nd place (1975–76)
- Swimming & diving (boys): State Champions (1931–32, 1933–34, 1934–35, 1935–36, 1936–37); 3rd place (1937–38, 1951–52, 1952–53, 1953–54, 1954–1955, 1958–59): 4th place (1932–33, 1942–43)
- Track & field (boys): State Champions (1940–41, 1945–46); 2nd place (1930–31, 1936–37, 1943–44)
- Wrestling: 2nd place (1969–70); 4th place (1972–73)

== Notable alumni ==
=== Government ===
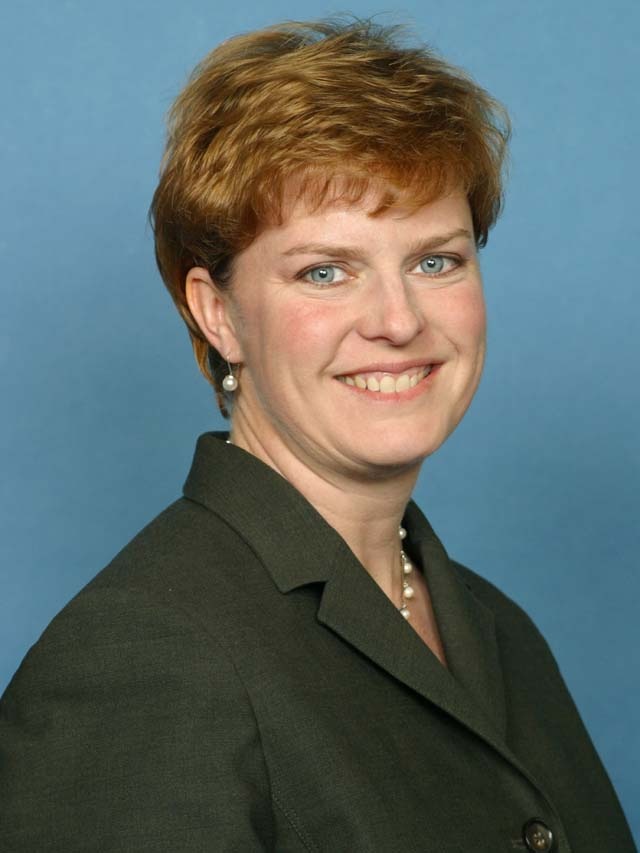
Melissa Bean, Congresswoman

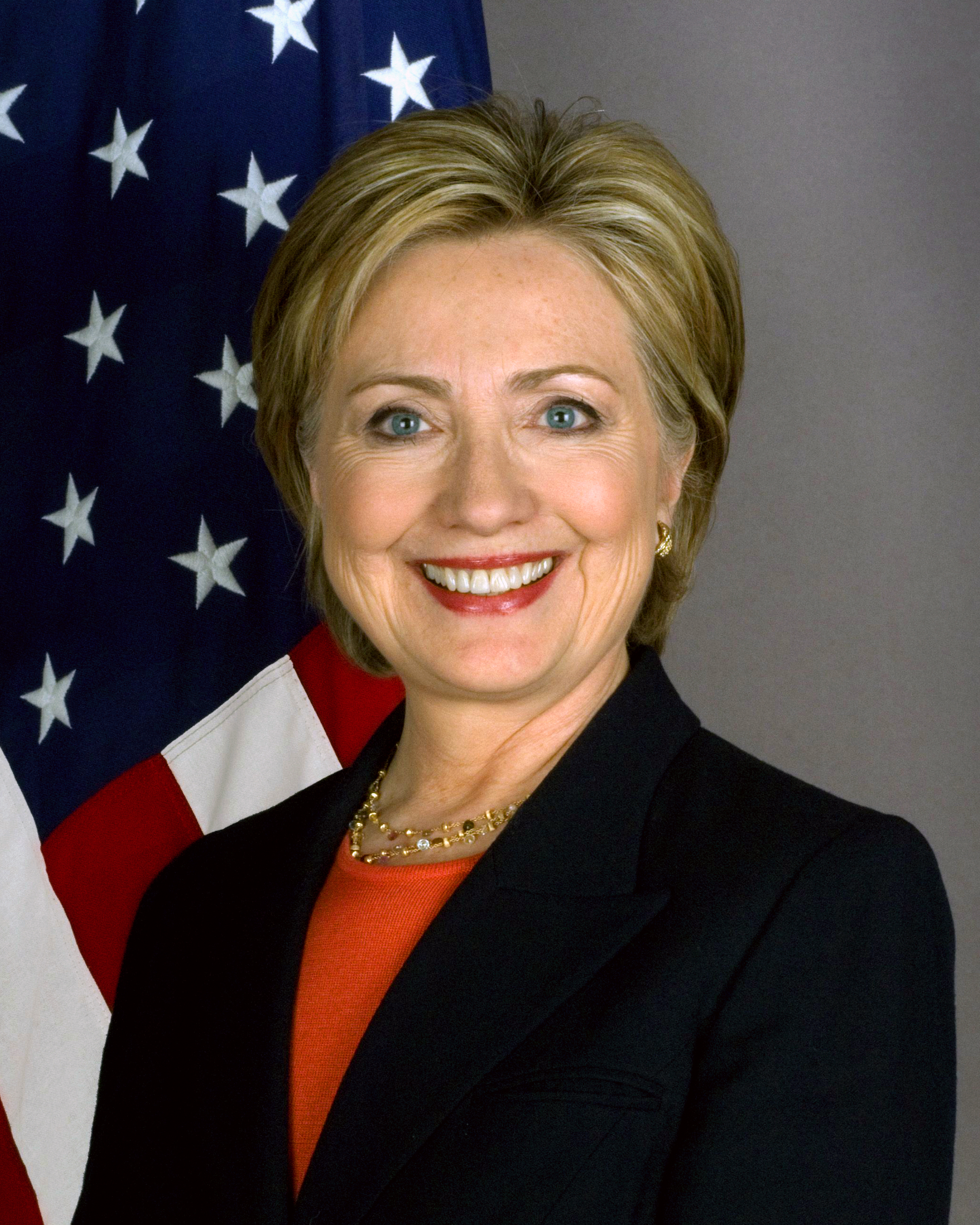
Hillary Clinton, U.S. Secretary of State

- Melissa Bean (1980) was a member of the United States House of Representatives from 2005 to 2011, representing Illinois' 8th congressional district.
- Hillary Clinton (1965) was First Lady of the United States (1993–2001), a United States senator from New York (2001–09), U.S. Secretary of State (2009–13), and a candidate for the Democratic Party's nomination for President of the United States (2007–08) and (2015–16). Clinton attended Maine East from 1961 to 1964, but was redistricted into and then graduated from Maine South High School after the newer school opened.
- James B. Loken (1958) has served as a judge on the United States Court of Appeals for the Eighth Circuit since 1990, and has been its Chief Judge since 2003.
- Ameya Pawar (1998) currently serves as the alderman for the 47th Ward of the City of Chicago. Pawar is the first Indian American and Asian American in Chicago City Council history. In 2017 he was a candidate for the Democratic primary for Governor of Illinois for the 2018 election.
- Philip Tone (1940) was a U.S. District Court judge who from 1974 to 1980 served on the United States Court of Appeals for the Seventh Circuit. He helped investigate Billy Carter's involvement with the government of Libya.

=== Academia ===
- Larry Kramer (1976) is the former Dean of Stanford Law School and past President of the Hewlett Foundation. He currently serves as President of the London School of Economics.

=== Writing and journalism ===
- Robert Appelbaum (1970) is a professor of English literature at Uppsala University, Sweden, and the author of many articles and books on literary history and contemporary culture.
- Marc Hempel (1975) is a cartoonist and author.
- Richard Maxwell (1986) is a playwright who won a Special Citation Obie Award in 1999 for his play House.
- Marshall Seese (1960) is a retired meteorologist formerly with The Weather Channel.

=== Arts ===
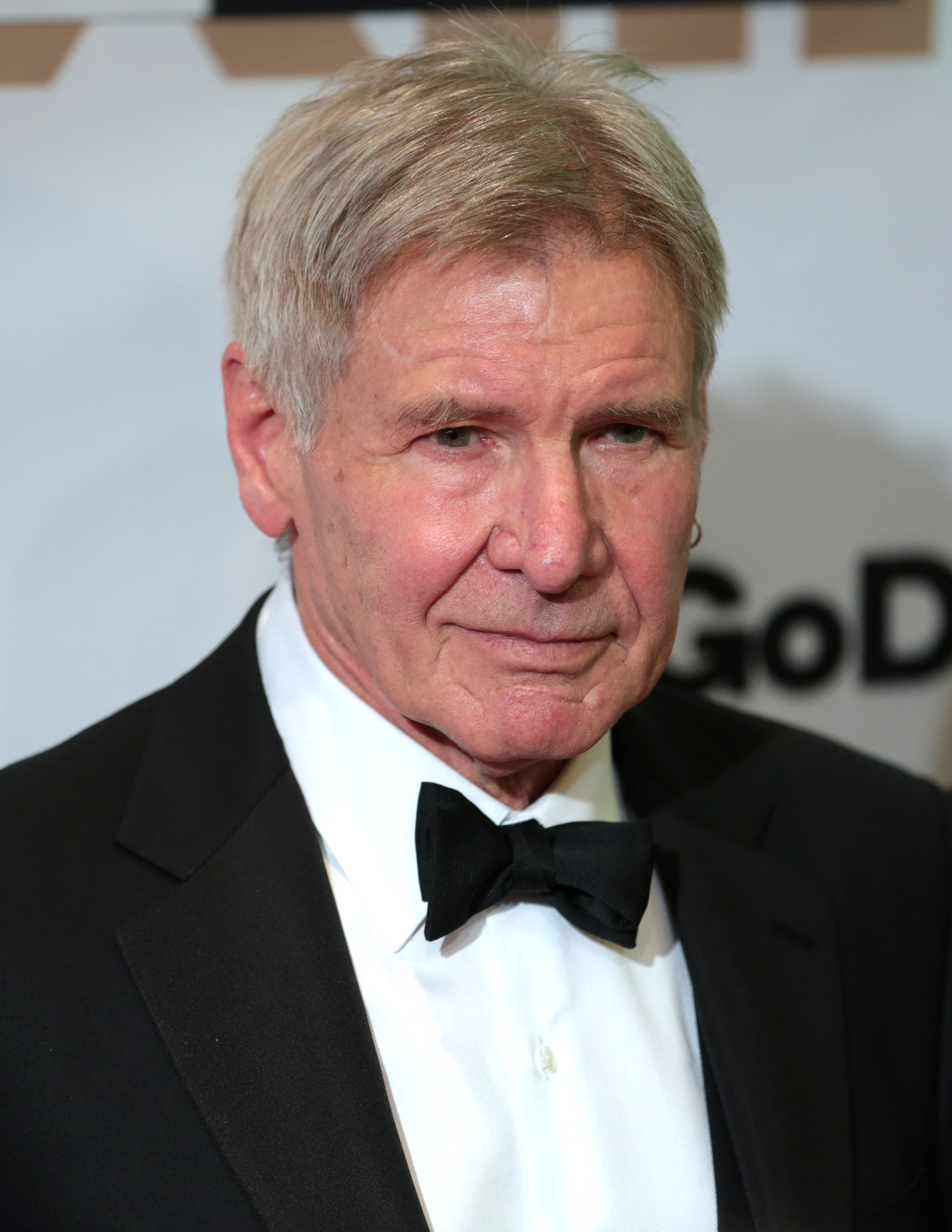
Harrison Ford, actor

- The Hager Twins, also known as the "Hager Brothers" and "The Hagers", were a duo of American country music singers and comedians who first gained fame on the TV series Hee Haw. They were identical twin brothers Jim (August 30, 1941 – May 1, 2008) and Jon Hager (August 30, 1941 – January 9, 2009)
- Bob Abrahamian (1995) was a soul music deejay, historian, archivist and record collector.
- Karen Black (1957) was an Oscar–nominated and two–time Golden Globe-winning actress (5 Easy Pieces, Easy Rider).
- Hugh Brannum (1927) was an actor best known for his portrayal of Mr. Green Jeans on the children's show Captain Kangaroo.
- Harrison Ford (1960) is an Oscar and Golden Globe–nominated actor best known for playing roles such as Indiana Jones, Han Solo and Jack Ryan.
- Jami Gertz (1983) is an Emmy–nominated actress (The Lost Boys, Twister).
- Steve Goodman (1965) was a two–time Grammy Award–winning folk singer-songwriter best known for writing "City of New Orleans" and "Go, Cubs, Go".
- Rich Koz (1970) is a Chicago radio and television personality best known for playing the Son of Svengoolie.
- Scott Mutter (1961) is an internationally recognized photographer.
- Carrie Snodgress (1963) is an Oscar–nominated and Golden Globe–winning actress (Diary of a Mad Housewife).
- Michael Janis (1977) – award-winning glass artist
- Randy Waldman 1973 has been Barbra Streisand's Pianist and Arranger for about 30 years or so
- Patrick Leonard producer, Arranger, Songwriter, Keyboardist for Madonna, Jewel, Sean Lennon, Michael Jackson, etc
- David Hiller (1971) was publisher, president and CEO of the Chicago Tribune and subsequently the Los Angeles Times

=== Athletics ===
- Dave Bergman is a former MLB player (New York Yankees, Houston Astros, San Francisco Giants, Detroit Tigers) who is a 1971 graduate of Maine South.
- Joey Ray, American artistic gymnast and Pan American Games medalist
- Steve Smith (1962) was an American football player (1966, 1968–74) who played in Super Bowl IV for the Minnesota Vikings.
