= Park Ridge, Illinois =

- City
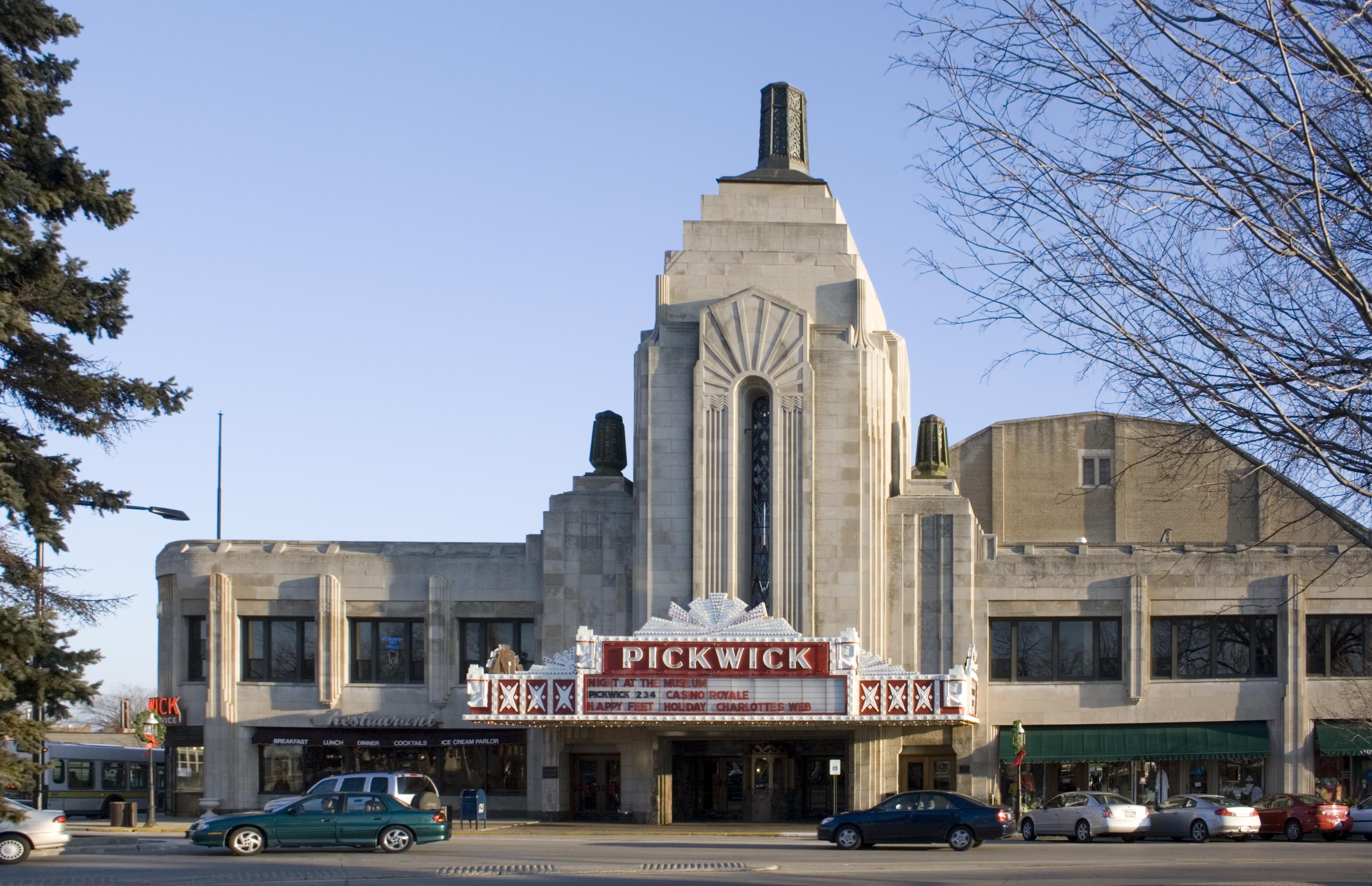
- Pickwick Theatre

- Flag Seal
- Interactive map of Park Ridge, Illinois
- Location within Greater Chicago Location within Illinois Location within the United States
- Coordinates: 42°0′43″N 87°50′30″W
- Country: United States
- State: Illinois
- County: Cook
- Township: Maine, Leyden, Norwood Park
- Incorporated: 1873

Government
  - Type: Council–manager
  - Mayor: Marty Maloney
  - Budget: $76,960,156 (fiscal year: 2022)

Area
  - Total: 7.14 sq mi (18.48 km^{2})
  - Land: 7.09 sq mi (18.36 km^{2})
  - Water: 0.046 sq mi (0.12 km^{2}) 0.56%

Population (2020)
  - Total: 39,656
  - Density: 5,595.2/sq mi (2,160.32/km^{2})
- Down 0.8% from 2000
- Demonym: Park Ridgian
- ZIP code(s): 60068
- Area code(s): 847, 224
- FIPS code: 17-57875
- Website: parkridge.us

Park Ridge is a city in Cook County, Illinois, United States, and a northwestern suburb of the Chicago metropolitan area. It is located 15 miles (24 km) north of downtown Chicago. It is close to O'Hare International Airport, major expressways, and rail transportation. It borders three community areas of Chicago in its Far Northwest Side: Edison Park, Norwood Park, and O'Hare.

The soil is abundant with clay deposits, which made it a brick-making center for the developing city of Chicago. Park Ridge was originally called Pennyville to honor George Penny, the businessman who owned the local brickyard along with Robert Meacham. Later it was named Brickton. The Des Plaines River divides Park Ridge from neighboring Des Plaines, which is west of Park Ridge. Chicago is south and east of Park Ridge, and Niles and unincorporated Maine Township are to its north.

Per the 2020 census, the population of Park Ridge was 39,656.

== History ==
This Civil War memorial is located in Maine Cemetery at Dee Road and Touhy Avenue.

The area of Park Ridge was inhabited by the Potawatomie until they were removed in 1833. The area was a convenient portage between the Des Plaines and Chicago rivers for the French explorers and in the early 1830s, the first settlers arrived from New England and New York. In 1854 George Penny established a brickworks in the area. Due to the brickwork and the abundance of clay, Park Ridge was nicknamed "Brickton" by locals. In 1910 Park Ridge had a population of 2,009. In 1930 the population was 10,417. In 1950 the population was 16,602. In 1960 the population was 32,625, with 99.9% of the population white. There were five African-Americans and 31 people classed other than black or white. By 1970, the population had risen to 42,466. In 2016, Hillary Rodham Clinton, a graduate of the first class of Park Ridge's Maine South High School (1965) and former First Lady, was the Democratic candidate for President of the United States.

== Geography ==
According to the 2021 census gazetteer files, Park Ridge has a total area of 7.14 square miles (18.49 km^{2}), of which 7.09 square miles (18.36 km^{2}) (or 99.34%) is land and 0.05 square miles (0.13 km^{2}) (or 0.66%) is water.

=== Climate ===
Park Ridge falls under the USDA 5b Plant Hardiness zone.

Climate data for Park Ridge, Illinois
Month	Jan	Feb	Mar	Apr	May	Jun	Jul	Aug	Sep	Oct	Nov	Dec	Year
Record high °F (°C)	67.0 (19.4)	75.0 (23.9)	88.0 (31.1)	91.0 (32.8)	98.0 (36.7)	104.0 (40.0)	105.0 (40.6)	102.0 (38.9)	101.0 (38.3)	94.0 (34.4)	81.0 (27.2)	71.0 (21.7)	105.0 (40.6)
Mean daily maximum °F (°C)	30 (−1)	35 (2)	46 (8)	58 (14)	70 (21)	79 (26)	84 (29)	81 (27)	74 (23)	62 (17)	47 (8)	34 (1)	58 (15)
Mean daily minimum °F (°C)	14 (−10)	19 (−7)	29 (−2)	38 (3)	47 (8)	63 (17)	62 (17)	54 (12)	42 (6)	42 (6)	32 (0)	20 (−7)	39 (4)
Record low °F (°C)	−27.0 (−32.8)	−21.0 (−29.4)	−12.0 (−24.4)	7.0 (−13.9)	27.0 (−2.8)	35.0 (1.7)	45.0 (7.2)	42.0 (5.6)	29.0 (−1.7)	14.0 (−10.0)	−2.0 (−18.9)	−25.0 (−31.7)	−27.0 (−32.8)
Average precipitation inches (mm)	1.73 (44)	1.87 (47)	2.50 (64)	3.38 (86)	3.68 (93)	3.45 (88)	3.7 (94)	4.9 (120)	3.21 (82)	3.15 (80)	3.15 (80)	2.25 (57)	33.82 (859)
Source: <Park Ridge, Illinois Weather= >weather.com. "Park Ridge, Illinois Weather". Park Ridge, Illinois Weather Data. Open Publishing.

== Demographics ==
Historical population
Census	Pop.	Note	%±
1880	457		—
1890	987		116.0%
1900	1,340		35.8%
1910	2,009		49.9%
1920	3,383		68.4%
1930	10,417		207.9%
1940	12,063		15.8%
1950	16,602		37.6%
1960	32,659		96.7%
1970	42,614		30.5%
1980	38,704		−9.2%
1990	36,175		−6.5%
2000	37,775		4.4%
2010	37,480		−0.8%
2020	39,656		5.8%
U.S. Decennial Census; 2010 2020

=== Racial and ethnic composition ===
Park Ridge city, Illinois – Racial and ethnic composition Note: the US Census treats Hispanic/Latino as an ethnic category. This table excludes Latinos from the racial categories and assigns them to a separate category. Hispanics/Latinos may be of any race.
Race / Ethnicity (NH = Non-Hispanic)	Pop 2000	Pop 2010	Pop 2020	% 2000	% 2010	% 2020
White alone (NH)	35,307	33,744	33,444	93.47%	90.03%	84.34%
Black or African American alone (NH)	85	168	204	0.23%	0.45%	0.51%
Native American or Alaska Native alone (NH)	20	19	16	0.05%	0.05%	0.04%
Asian alone (NH)	996	1,373	1,913	2.64%	3.66%	4.82%
Pacific Islander alone (NH)	16	4	3	0.04%	0.01%	0.01%
Other race alone (NH)	27	36	128	0.07%	0.10%	0.32%
Mixed race or Multiracial (NH)	211	362	1,093	0.56%	0.97%	2.76%
Hispanic or Latino (any race)	1,113	1,774	2,855	2.95%	4.73%	7.20%
Total	37,775	37,480	39,656	100.00%	100.00%	100.00%

=== 2020 census ===
As of the 2020 census, Park Ridge had a population of 39,656 and 14,731 households; 10,323 families resided in the city. The population density was 5,557.95 inhabitants per square mile (2,145.94/km^{2}).

The median age was 44.1 years. 23.7% of residents were under the age of 18 and 21.0% of residents were 65 years of age or older. For every 100 females there were 92.9 males, and for every 100 females age 18 and over there were 89.6 males age 18 and over.

100.0% of residents lived in urban areas, while 0.0% lived in rural areas.

There were 14,731 households and 10,323 families in Park Ridge, of which 34.2% had children under the age of 18 living in them. Of all households, 60.8% were married-couple households, 12.4% were households with a male householder and no spouse or partner present, and 24.1% were households with a female householder and no spouse or partner present. About 24.1% of all households were made up of individuals and 14.5% had someone living alone who was 65 years of age or older.

There were 15,366 housing units, of which 4.1% were vacant. The homeowner vacancy rate was 1.1% and the rental vacancy rate was 4.9%.

Racial composition as of the 2020 census
Race	Number	Percent
White	34,142	86.1%
Black or African American	212	0.5%
American Indian and Alaska Native	64	0.2%
Asian	1,931	4.9%
Native Hawaiian and Other Pacific Islander	3	0.0%
Some other race	722	1.8%
Two or more races	2,582	6.5%
Hispanic or Latino (of any race)	2,855	7.2%

=== Income ===
The median income for a household in the city was $113,809, and the median income for a family was $145,995. Males had a median income of $82,222 versus $51,371 for females. The per capita income for the city was $58,978. About 2.4% of families and 3.9% of the population were below the poverty line, including 3.0% of those under age 18 and 3.8% of those age 65 or over.

== Economy ==
=== Top employers ===
According to Park Ridge's 2020 Comprehensive Annual Financial Report, the top employers in the city were:

#	Employer	# of Employees
1	Advocate Lutheran General Hospital	3,693
2	Maine Township High School District 207	975
3	Park Ridge Park District	813
4	Park Ridge-Niles School District 64	700
5	City of Park Ridge	350
6	Presence Resurrection Health Care	332
7	FM Global	300
8	Mariano's Fresh Market	276
9	Advocate Medical Group	250
10	Park Ridge Community Bank	225

== Arts and culture ==
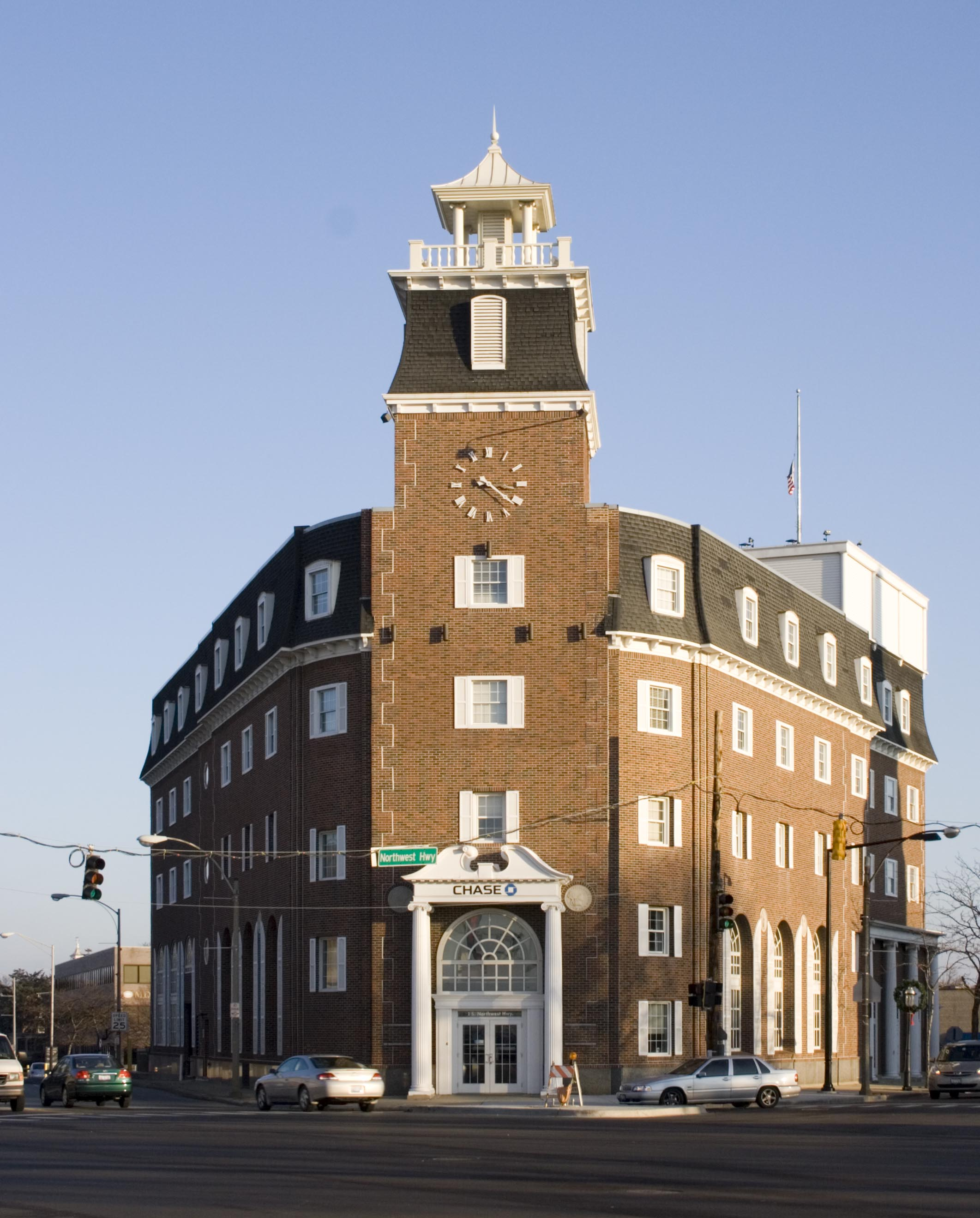
The Chase Bank building at Uptown

Park Ridge's most recognizable landmark is the Pickwick Theatre, an Art Deco building dating back to 1928. It is a movie theater and a venue for plays and concerts. In 1975, the theater was named to the National Register of Historic Places. Although smaller theaters have been added to the rear of the building, the main auditorium theater remains intact in its original large five-aisle state. The main auditorium can seat up to 800 people. In the 1980s, the Pickwick's facade was one of many used as the backdrop for the opening credits of Gene Siskel and Roger Ebert's At the Movies. Until 2017, it also had a restaurant of the same name next door.

The city is home to the Park Ridge Public Library.

City of Park Ridge Historic Preservation Commission's Historic Landmarks and 100 Year-Old Homes

== Education ==
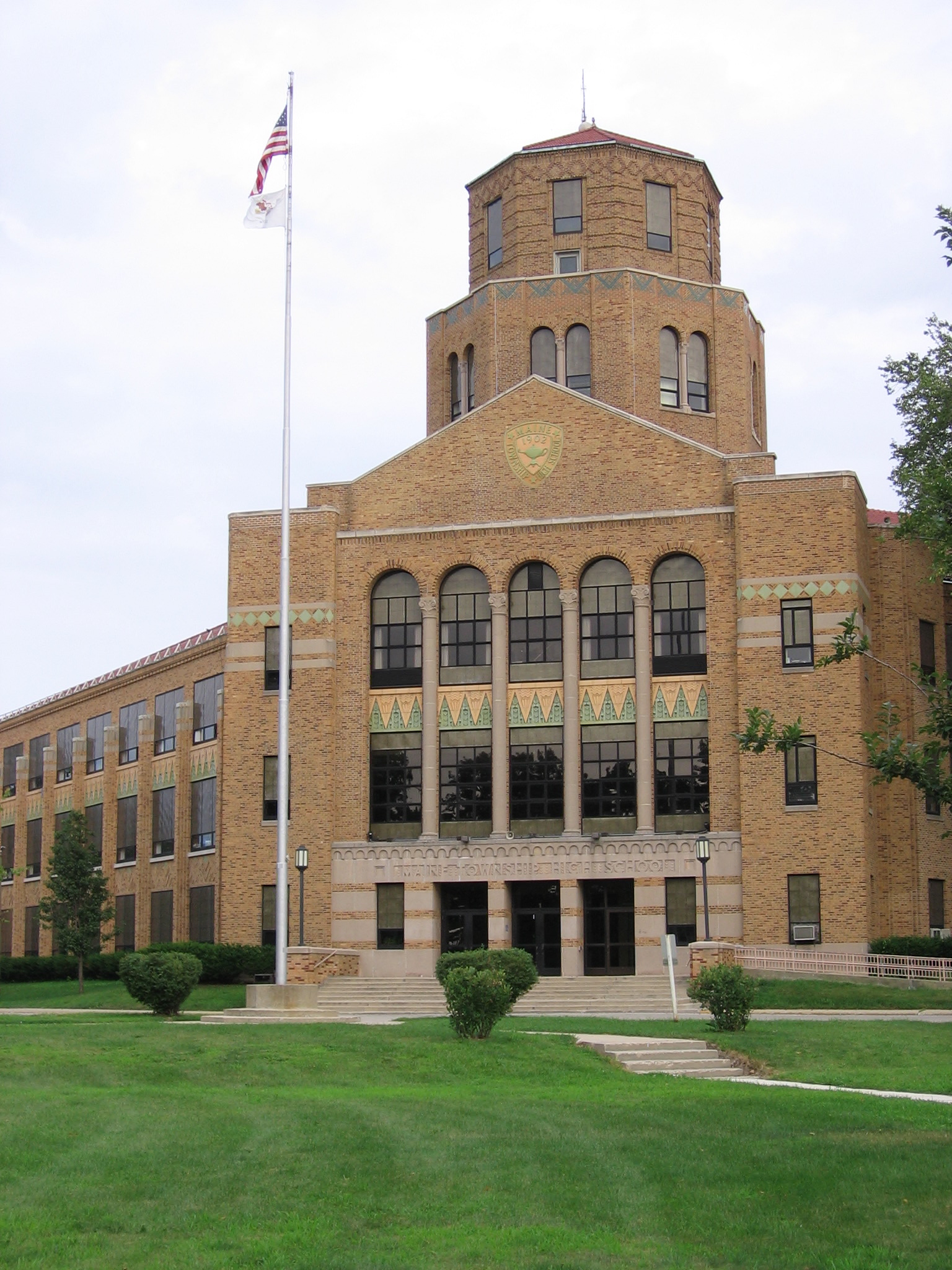
Maine East High School has stood at Dempster Street and Potter Road since 1929.

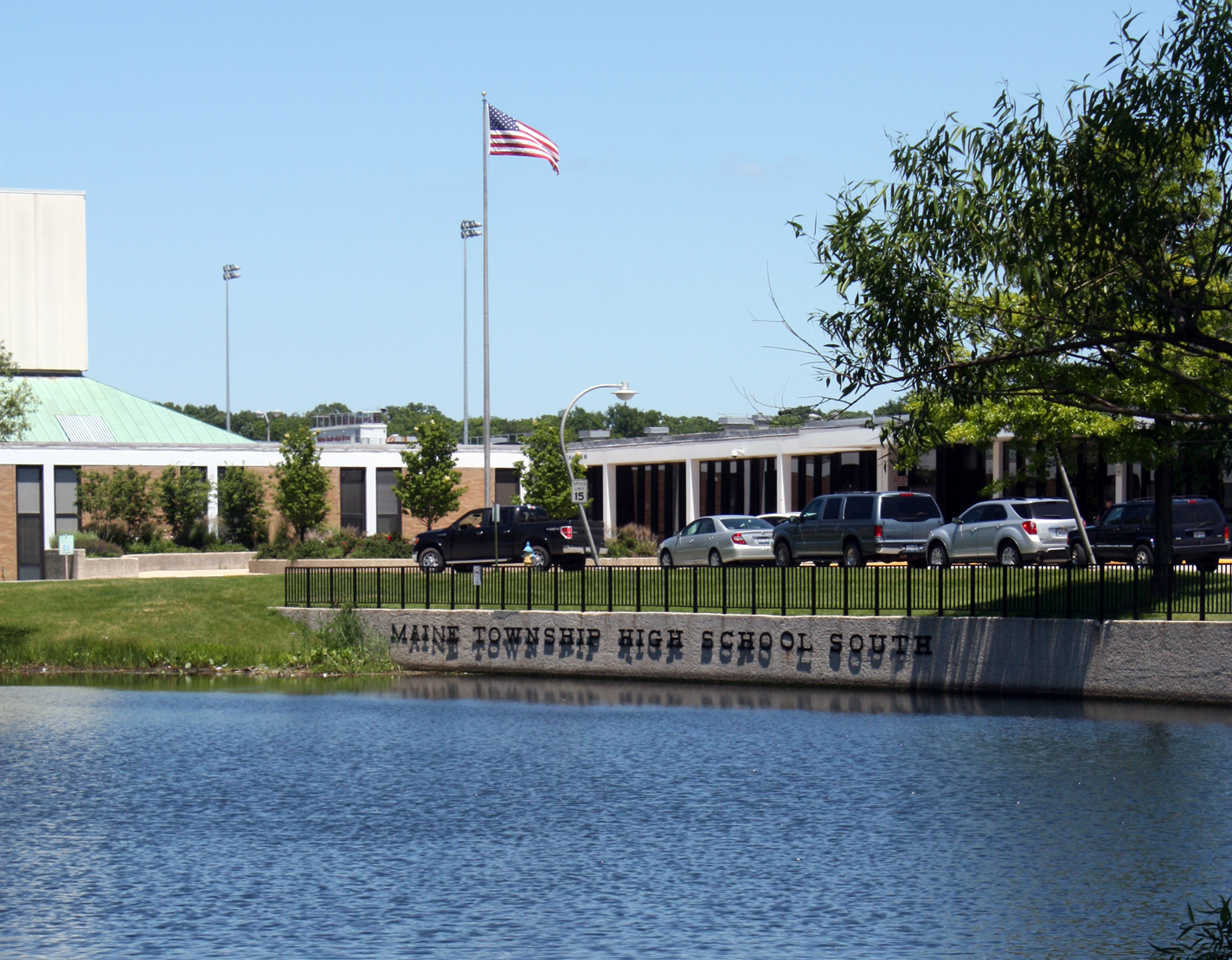
Maine South High School opened in 1964 at Dee Road and Talcott Avenue.

Park Ridge is served by the Park Ridge-Niles School District 64, which has its headquarters in the Raymond E. Hendee Educational Service Center in Park Ridge. Area middle schools include Lincoln Middle School and Emerson Middle School in Niles. At one point there were nine public K–6 elementary schools: Oakton, Madison, Edison, Merrill, Carpenter, Field, Franklin, Roosevelt, and Washington. Only the latter five remain today, and all are in Park Ridge. Jefferson School is also part of the district and houses the special needs preschool for children ages 3 and 4. K-5 after-school programs are hosted by the Park Ridge Park District.

St. Paul of the Cross and Mary Seat of Wisdom are the two Catholic elementary schools. St. Andrews is a Lutheran elementary school.

The town is served by Maine Township High School District 207, which includes Maine South High School, and Maine East High School. Students who live in northern Park Ridge have the option of attending either Maine East or Maine South. Maine West High School is located to the west in Des Plaines. Maine North High School was a school in unincorporated Maine Township and part of Maine Township High School District 207. It closed in 1981 as the student population of Maine Township shrank.

District 207 shares student-run radio and television stations operating with the call letters WMTH-FM (W Maine Township High). Actor Harrison Ford, known for his roles in the Indiana Jones, Star Wars, and Blade Runner movies, went to Maine East, and has been credited as being the radio station's first sports announcer. Since 2007, WMTH Radio can be heard live on any of the district high school homepage.

The town is a part of the Oakton Community College district.

== Transportation ==
The Park Ridge station and Dee Road station provide Metra commuter rail service along the Union Pacific Northwest Line. Trains travel southeast to Ogilvie Transportation Center in Chicago, and northwest to either Harvard station or McHenry station.

Pace provides bus service on multiple routes connecting Park Ridge to destinations across the region. Additionally, CTA operates the Route 68 bus to Chicago.

== Notable people ==
Park Ridge is the hometown of Hillary Rodham Clinton. When she visited Park Ridge on the occasion of her 50th birthday in 1997, the city renamed the southeast corner of the intersection of Elm and Wisner streets, next to her childhood home, "Rodham Corner". Clinton graduated from Maine Township High School South, a new school built to accommodate the population of baby boomers coming through at the time.

Park Ridge is also the hometown of movie stars Carrie Snodgress, Karen Black, Suzanne Snyder and Harrison Ford. All four attended Maine Township High School East. Sean Giambrone also grew up in Park Ridge. He is most notable for his role in The Goldbergs as Adam. He went to Lincoln Middle School and Maine South High School.

The first U.S. citizen to be canonized, Mother Frances Cabrini, attended St. Paul of the Cross Church and owned a farm at the north edge of Park Ridge.

Actor Harrison Ford, known for his roles in the Indiana Jones, Star Wars, and Blade Runner movies, went to Maine East, and has been credited as being the radio station's first sports announcer.

James Pankow, a trombone player, songwriter, composer, and brass instrument player, best known as a founding member of the rock band Chicago.

Artist Grant Wood once lived and owned a shop in Park Ridge.

== In popular culture ==
=== In film ===
- The 1980 film The Blues Brothers had some scenes filmed in Park Ridge, including the scene in which the brothers are first pulled over by the state police and the beginning of the subsequent chase. The Nelson Funeral Home and Shell gas station which the brothers drive past as the police pull out to intercept them are still in business at the intersection of Talcott and Cumberland avenues. The brothers are pulled over at the intersection of Cumberland and Gillick. As the chase progresses, a trooper radios that the chase is "proceeding on Courtland Avenue"; the subsequent scene in which the Blues Brothers and the police spin out in a three-way intersection occurs at the intersection of Devon Avenue, Talcott Road, and Courtland Avenue.
- In the 1990 film Home Alone, Buzz McCallister wears a Maine South High School letterman's jacket.

=== In television ===
- A curved-shaped house on Dee Road, located on Park Lake, appears several times in the TV police drama Crime Story, in which it is owned by crime boss Phil Bartoli (played by Jon Polito).
  - In one episode, while driving away from the house, Pauli Taglia (John Santucci) says, "We're in Park Ridge; nothing happens in Park Ridge."
- In the Route 66 episode "Voice at the End of the Line" (season 3, episode 5), Todd Stiles (Martin Milner) and Buzz Murdock (George Maharis) are seen exiting a building labeled Park Ridge Medical Center, which was located at the southwest corner of Talcott and Canfield. The scene continues as they walk toward the corner of Yost and Canfield, where several Park Ridge houses on Yost are in view. Later in the episode, Todd and Buzz park in front of a white house located at the northeast corner of Prospect and Stewart Avenues, which was used as a boarding house in the episode. A later camera angle shows the house in the background as Todd and Buzz talk to a cab driver.
- In 2022, the Pickwick Theatre was featured in the "Completely Shattered" episode (episode 1103) of NBC's Chicago Fire (TV series).

== Sister city ==
Park Ridge has one sister city, which was formed in 1998:

- Kinver, Staffordshire, England
