= Maine South High School =

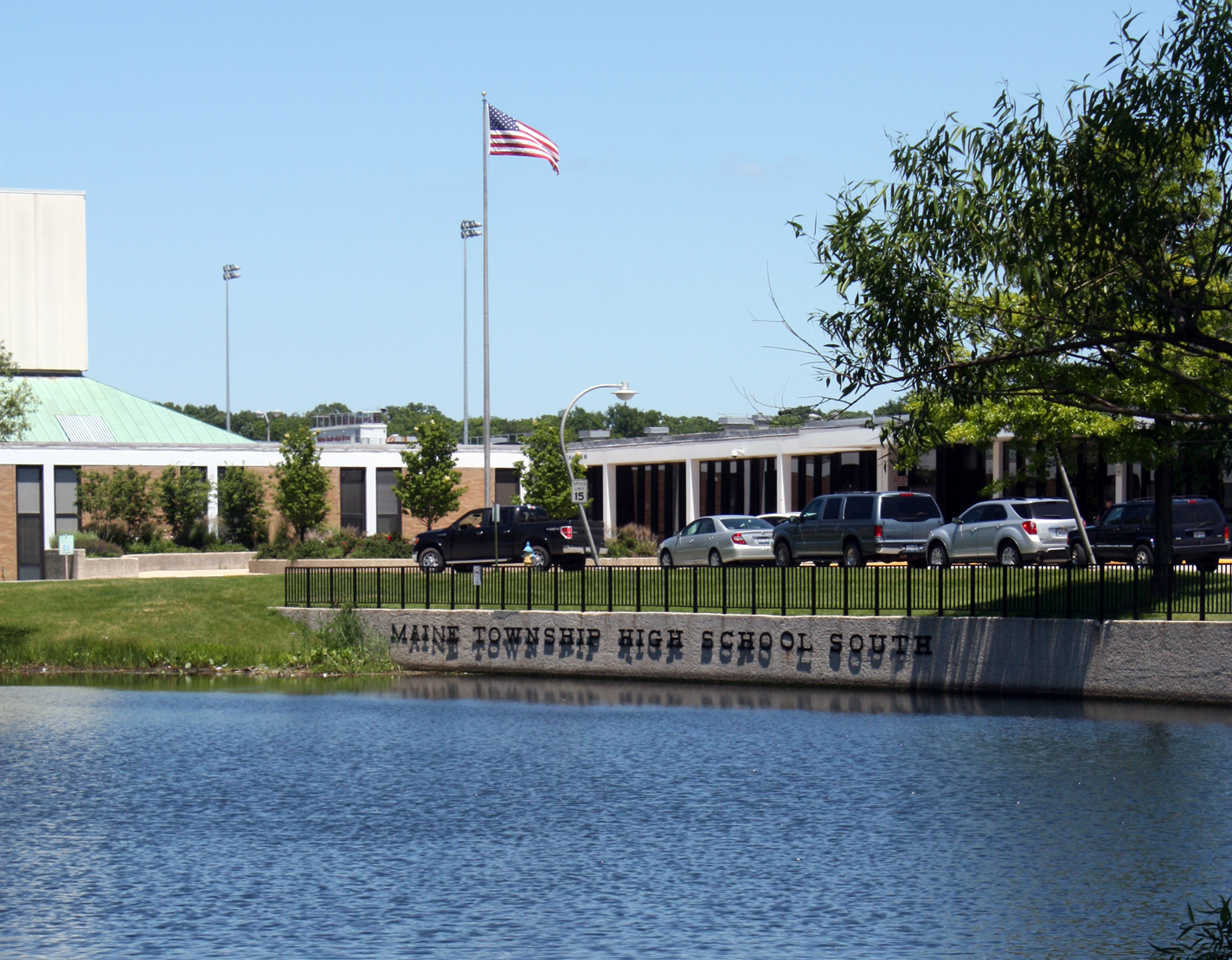

Location
- 1111 South Dee Road; Park Ridge, Illinois 60068; United States; 42.0014°N 87.8531°W

Information
- School type: public, secondary
- Opened: 1964; 62 years ago
- School district: Maine Township High School District 207
- NCES District ID: 1724090
- Superintendent: Tatiana Bonuma
- CEEB code: 143377
- NCES School ID: 172409005031
- Principal: Antwan Babakhani
- Teaching staff: 150.90 (FTE)
- Grades: 9–12
- Gender: coed
- Enrollment: 2,491 (2023-2024)
- Average class size: 21
- Student to teacher ratio: 16.51
- Campus type: suburban
- Colors: red black white
- Fight song: Hail to the Hawks
- Athletics conference: Central Suburban League
- Mascot: Harley
- Team name: Hawks
- Publication: Equinox
- Newspaper: Southwords
- Yearbook: Eyrie
- TV/radio: WMTH
- Website: south.maine207.org

Maine South High School (officially known as Maine Township High School South) is a public four-year high school located in Park Ridge, Illinois, United States, a northwest suburb of Chicago. It is part of Maine Township High School District 207.

Maine South is well known for its academic, athletic, and fine arts success. Since at least 1992, it has also received mention in national media as the alma mater of Hillary Clinton, a member of the school's first graduating class.

== History ==
Bids on the construction of Maine South opened on March 18, 1963. Maine South was built in 1964 on the grounds of a former landfill to meet the growing educational needs of the area, mainly the city of Park Ridge, but also some of Niles, Harwood Heights, Norridge, and unincorporated Chicago.

The first principal, Clyde Watson, was appointed in December 1963, in order to give him time to begin forming the first parents and music booster clubs.

Until 1969, students were under a dress code that included a requirement for men to be clean shaven, and that hair had to be cut above the collar. 1969 also saw the first expansion of the school with the addition of the student cafeteria, and some physical education and classroom areas.

In 1973, the North Central Association, an academic accreditation agency, rated Maine South as "one of the top 10 high schools in the nation."

In 1986 and 1987, officials from Maine South were instrumental in pushing the Illinois High School Association to recognize girls soccer.

The 1988–1989 school year saw Maine South recognized by the United States Department of Education as a Blue Ribbon School.

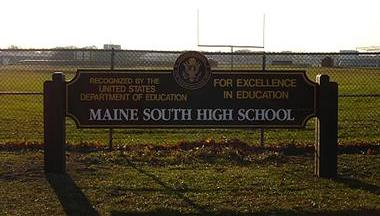
Welcome sign

In 1996, after several decades of existing in the shadow of nearby O'Hare International Airport, the school received federal funds which allowed for the installation of soundproof windows, air conditioning, and sound dampening ceilings. The project began in 1997 and took three years to complete.

1998 saw the completion of the last major addition to the building: a sixteen classroom, four laboratory extension on the east end of the academic wing.

In 2008, graduation ceremonies, which since the first graduating class had been held on campus (except for the 2004 graduating ceremonies, which were held at Harper Community College due to the construction of the new bleachers), were moved to the nearby Rosemont Theatre.

Over the summer of 2009, the athletic stadium had lights and an artificial turf surface installed.

In July 2011, the Guinness World Records certified that the Maine South class of 2014 had set a world record for the most multiple birth sets in the same academic year (16 sets of twins and 3 sets of triplets).

== Academics ==
Maine South's academic programs range from remedial/academy class, to accelerated honors/AP classes. Based on performances in 2008, Maine South is ranked 11th among public non-magnet high schools in the state of Illinois, ranked according to a standardization of Prairie State Achievement Examination (PSAE) scores. Maine South is ranked 9th by the Chicago Tribune among public non-magnet high schools in Illinois, ranked according to average PSAE scores.

The Foreign Language Department offers five-year programs in French, German, Italian, and Spanish, and a four-year program in Mandarin.

== Student life ==
=== Academic competition ===
In 2007, the school's Scholastic Bowl team won the state championship tournament sponsored by the Ancient, Free, & Accepted Masons of Illinois.

The chess team won IHSA State Championships in 2001–02, 2002–03, & 2006–07.

=== Mock trial team ===
In April 2023, the Maine South Mock Trial Team won the State of Illinois High School Mock Trial State Championship and competed in the Mock Trial National Competition in Little Rock, Arkansas.

=== Athletics ===
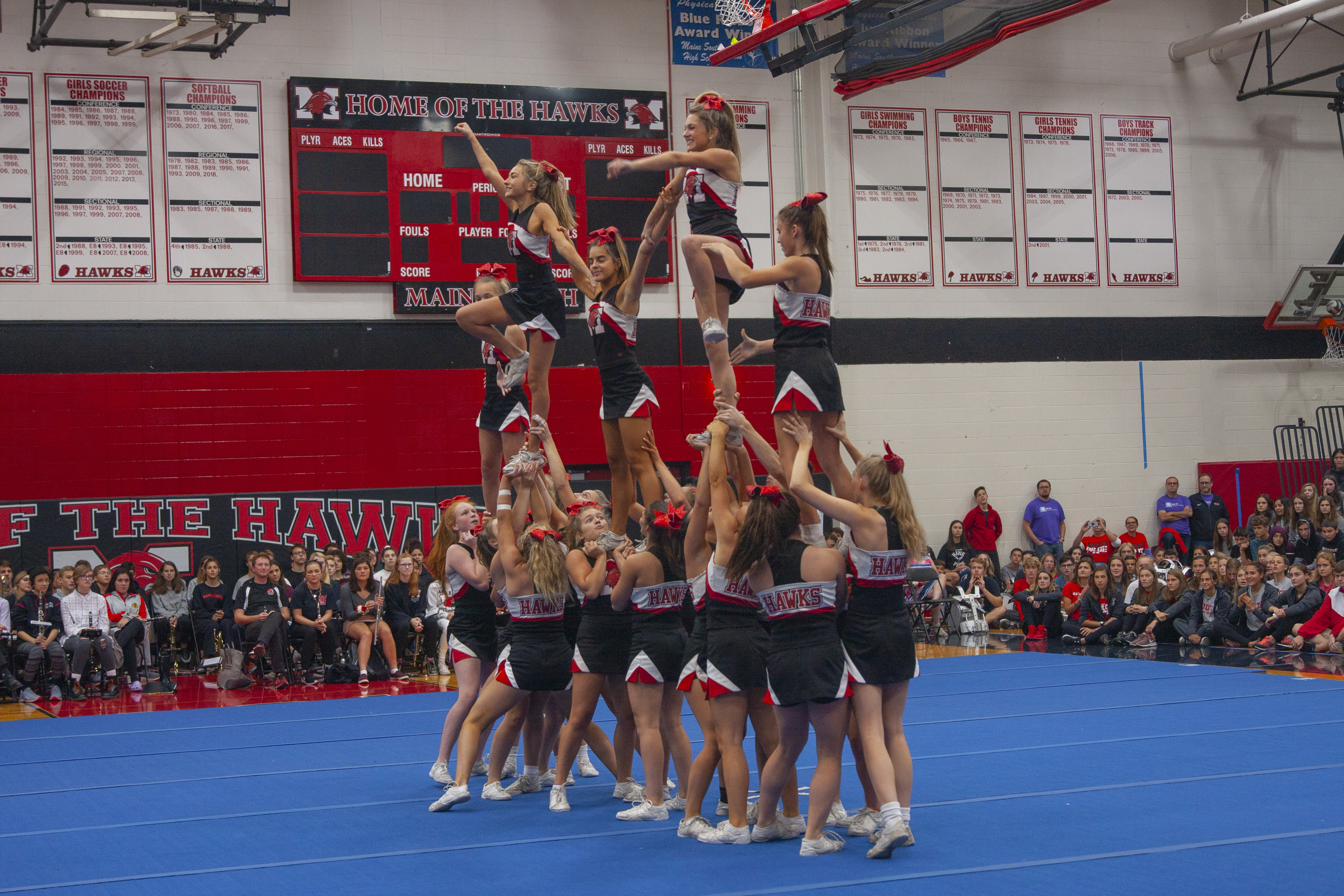
Cheerleaders performing during a pep rally.

Maine South sponsors teams for both boys and girls in basketball, cross country, golf, gymnastics, lacrosse, soccer, swimming & diving, tennis, track & field, volleyball, and water polo. Boys are also able to compete in baseball, football, and wrestling, while girls are able to compete in badminton, cheerleading, and softball.

Maine South competes in the Central Suburban League South Division. In state competition, Maine South competes in the largest potential school classes in each sport sponsored by the Illinois High School Association.

The following teams have won IHSA sponsored State Championship Tournaments:

- Basketball (boys): 1978–79
- Flag Football (girls): 2025-26
- Football: 1995–96, 2000–01, 2008–09, 2009–10, 2010–11, 2016–17
- Swimming & Diving (girls): 1975–76
- Volleyball (boys): 2005–06
- Dance Team (Hawkettes): 2013

In addition, the girls soccer team won three consecutive unofficial State Championship Tournaments in 1983–84, 1984–85, and 1985–86, prior to the IHSA sanctioning soccer for girls. Over that time, the team went 60-0-4. From 1985 to 1987, the team scored in 62 consecutive matches, which is an Illinois state record among girls teams, and would be second if boys teams were also included.

The Maine South Hawkettes dance team won UDA National Championships in High Kick in 2011, 2017, 2019, and 2022.

Maine South football went to the 8A State Championship and won three consecutive state championships from 2009 to 2011. Maine South were ranked first in state from 2009 to 2012

=== Clubs ===
Maine South supports 79 student organizations running the gamut from academic competition and performing arts to public service and special interest clubs.

=== Fine arts ===
The school sponsors several musical groups, including: marching band, concert band, two symphony bands, chamber orchestra, three symphony orchestras, a jazz band, among others.

The marching band has performed at several major events, including the 1981 Cherry Blossom Festival parade in Washington D.C, the 1984 Cotton Bowl Classic. It later performed at the 1996, 1999, and 2001 Orange Bowl Parades. The band also performed at the 1993 Presidential Inauguration Parade, as a representative of First Lady Hillary Rodham Clinton's alma mater.

In 2001, the Grammy Foundation named Maine South a Signature School.

In 2009 and 2011, violinist Mark Wood taught a series of workshops to the members of the school orchestra in preparation for a concert he performed with them.

== Notable alumni ==
=== Politics and law ===
- Hillary Rodham Clinton (1965), former First Lady of the United States (1993–2001), U.S. Senator from New York (2001–2009), United States Secretary of State (2009–2013), two-time presidential candidate, and nominee of the Democratic Party for President of the United States in the 2016 election. Clinton only attended Maine South during her senior year, which coincided with Maine South's first year of existence. For her first three years of high school, she attended Maine East.
- Mark Filip, federal district court judge for the Northern District of Illinois (2004–08)
- Penny Pullen (1965), former Illinois State representative and conservative activist
- Hugh Rodham (1968), politician
- Tony Rodham (1972), political consultant

=== Arts and entertainment ===
- Danny Corkill (1992), child actor.
- Sean Giambrone, actor known for TV series The Goldbergs
- Greg Glienna (1981), screenwriter
- Dave Mallow (1966), voice actor
- Frank Merle (1997), filmmaker
- John Pankow (1973), actor

=== Athletics ===
- Dave Bergman (1971), Major League Baseball first baseman
- Dave Butz (1969), NFL defensive lineman
- Tom Hoff (1991), indoor U.S. volleyball Olympian (2000, 2004, 2008)
- Adam Rosales (2001), major league baseball third baseman
- Jim Rushford, Major League Baseball outfielder
- David Santee (1975), Olympic figure skater (1976, 1980)
- Brian Schlitter, professional baseball pitcher
- Boris Shlapak, professional football and soccer player
- Peter Skoronski, NFL offensive lineman
- Nancy Swider (1974), Olympic speedskater (1976, 1980, 1984, 1988)
- Jim Walewander (1980), Major League Baseball player
- Joe Zdeb, Major League Baseball outfielder (1978–79)

=== Other ===
- Susan Lindquist, microbiologist
- Karen McCarron, murderer
- Ray Ozzie (1973), software industry entrepreneur
- Janet Shamlian (1980), journalist, NBC news correspondent
