= Maine North High School =

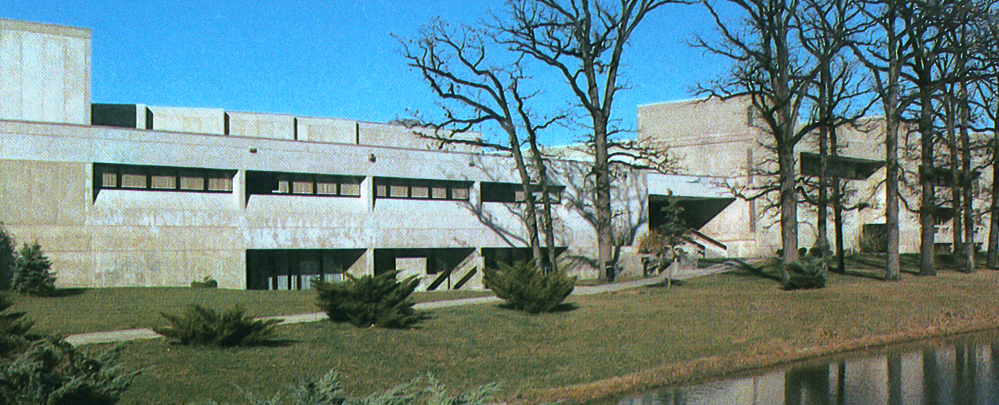
- Maine North circa 1979.

Location
- 9511 Harrison Street; Des Plaines, Illinois; United States; 42.060°N 87.863°W

Information
- School type: Public; Secondary
- Opened: August 1970
- Status: Closed
- Closed: May 1981
- School district: Maine Township High School District 207
- Grades: 9–12
- Gender: Coed
- Campus type: Suburban
- Colors: Black; Gold
- Athletics conference: Central Suburban League
- Team name: Norsemen
- Yearbook: Saga
- Elevation: 640 ft (200 m) AMSL

School location in the northeastern section of Illinois.

Maine North High School (officially was known as Maine Township High School North) was a public four–year high school in Des Plaines, Illinois, United States, located northwest of Chicago. Maine North was located in unincorporated Maine Township, part of Maine Township High School District 207. Maine North served parts of Des Plaines, Glenview, and Niles. Opened in August 1970, Maine North closed in May 1981. The building is constructed in brutalist style, and its architect was Donald Stillwaugh.

== History ==
As student population declined, the decision came down to closing Maine East or Maine North. Maine East, the oldest school in the district, opened in 1929, but also had considerable numbers of alumni and students with the S.O.S. (Save Our School) campaign pushing to keep it open. On November 17, 1980, the school board voted, 4–3, to close Maine North by the following year, citing that it was not only the smallest school, but the least centrally located of the schools in the district. In October, the board voted to close the school at the end of the 1980–1981 school year. The building was subsequently sold along with the District's administrative building, which had its offices relocated to Maine South High School.

== Filming The Breakfast Club ==
After its closing, Maine North was used for location shooting of the 1985 movie The Breakfast Club, filmed in the spring of 1984. Because the actual library was considered too small, the library scenes for the movie were shot in the school's gymnasium, where a set was constructed. A plaque downstairs in the building commemorates the movie being shot there.

Decades after the film's release, alumni of other area schools have claimed the final shot of the film was shot at their school's football field. However these rumors are false. On the 30th anniversary of the film's release, the Chicago Tribune specifically asked the film's cinematographer, Thomas Del Ruth, to address this controversy. He said: "The field shot? We did it behind the same school where we were shooting. We never left the premises during production."

== Later uses ==
The school was also used as a training facility for the Chicago Blitz of the short-lived United States Football League and was renamed Blitz Park by head coach George Allen. It also later served as a mortuary college. In 1986, the school's interior was featured in another movie, Ferris Bueller's Day Off.

As of 2023, the Maine North High School building is the district headquarters for the Illinois State Police.
