= Anime Midwest =

Anime convention in Illinois, US

Coordinates: 41°58′52″N 87°51′33″W

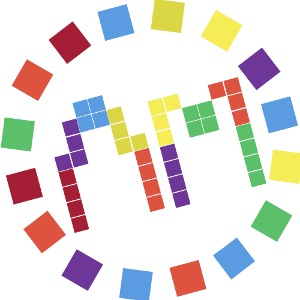
- Status: Active
- Genre: Anime, Japanese Culture, Video Gaming
- Venue: Donald E. Stephens Convention Center
- Location: Rosemont, Illinois
- Country: United States
- Inaugurated: 2011
- Organizer: AnimeCon.org
- Website: http://www.animemidwest.com/

Anime Midwest is an annual three-day anime convention held during July at the Donald E. Stephens Convention Center in Rosemont, Illinois. The convention is held in the same location as Anime Central.

== Programming ==
The convention typically offers anime screenings, artist room, concerts, cosplay masquerade contest, date auction, dealers room, fan panels, formal dance, guest autographs, karaoke, Maid Cafe, rave dances, tabletop gaming, video game tournaments, and workshops. The convention hosts a free ConSweet with free ramen noodles, rice, oatmeal, and soda for attendees.

== History ==
Anime Midwest moved to the Hyatt Regency O'Hare in Rosemont, Illinois, for 2013. The convention in 2015 had long registration line waits. Guests Deadlift Lolita, FEMM, Fuki, and Zwei could not attend Anime Midwest in 2019 due to visa issues. Anime Midwest 2020 was cancelled due to the COVID-19 pandemic. In 2021 the convention required masks, and had a reduced ConSweet due to the convention having a short amount of organization time.

=== Event history ===
Dates	Location	Atten.	Guests
June 15–17, 2011	Pheasant Run Resort; St. Charles, Illinois		Jillian Coglan, Samurai Dan Coglan, L33tStr33t Boys, John Patrick Lowrie, Jamie Marchi, Ellen McLain, Sean Schemmel, and Micah Solusod.
July 6–8, 2012	Wyndham Lisle-Chicago Hotel & Executive Meeting Center; Lisle, Illinois	Nearly; 2,000	Greg Ayres, Bea Billany, Jillian Coglan, Samurai Dan Coglan, Level Boys, Jamie Marchi, Joel McDonald, Mega Ran, The Pillowcases, Ian Sinclair, and Shinichi Watanabe.
July 5–7, 2013	Hyatt Regency O'Hare; Rosemont, Illinois	5,100	Airship O'Reilly, Dr. Awkward, Orlando Belisle, Jillian Coglan, Samurai Dan Coglan, Alan Evans, FanService Renji, Quinton Flynn, Todd Haberkorn, Brian Heinz, Steve Horton, Krazy Krow, Rob "Vash" Lewis, Russell Lissau, Lewis Lovhaug, John Patrick Lowrie, Ellen McLain, Midwest Karaoke Madness, Trevor A. Mueller, The Pillowcases, Malcolm Ray, Sleeping Samurai, Spike Spencer, Steam Powered Giraffe, Sonny Strait, Rachel Tietz, Doug Walker, and YTCracker.
July 4–6, 2014	Hyatt Regency O'Hare; Rosemont, Illinois	8,010	Curtis Arnott, Dr. Awkward, Greg Ayres, Orlando Belisle, Johnny Yong Bosch, Jillian Coglan, Samurai Dan Coglan, D.C. Douglas, Michelle Ann Dunphy, Eyeshine, Frenchy and the Punk, Scott Frerichs, Caitlin Glass, Brian Heinz, Steve Horton, Akinori Isobe, Brad Jones, Masumi Kano, Nick Landis, Russell Lissau, Lewis Lovhaug, Trevor A. Mueller, Chris Patton, The Pillowcases, Laura Post, Raj Ramayya, Malcolm Ray, Sleeping Samurai, Steam Powered Giraffe, Sonny Strait, Alexis Tipton, V is for Villains, Doug Walker, and YTCracker.
July 3–5, 2015	Hyatt Regency O'Hare; Rosemont, Illinois	10,500	Curtis Arnott, Greg Ayres, Brentalfloss, Chris Cason, Jillian Coglan, Samurai Dan Coglan, Amber Lee Connors, Nicole de Boer, Emily DeJesus, Robert DeJesus, D.C. Douglas, Caitlynn French, Frenchy and the Punk, Scott Frerichs, Brian Heinz, Steve Horton, Chuck Huber, Anna Ito, Krazy Krow, Nick Landis, Russell Lissau, London Has Fallen, Lewis Lovhaug, David Matranga, Joel McDonald, Mega Ran, Trevor A. Mueller, The Pillowcases, Chris Rager, Raj Ramayya, Blake Shepard, Lawrence Simpson, Spike Spencer, Steam Powered Giraffe, Sonny Strait, Eric Stuart, John Swasey, V is for Villains, Steven Wallace, Billy West, and YTCracker.
July 8–10, 2016	Hyatt Regency O'Hare; Rosemont, Illinois	12,500	Greg Ayres, Zach Callison, Jillian Coglan, Samurai Dan Coglan, Emily DeJesus, D.C. Douglas, Frenchy and the Punk, Brian Heinz, Chuck Huber, Kid Yuki and the Otakus, Shigeto Koyama, Krazy Krow, Russell Lissau, Lewis Lovhaug, Mega Ran, Trevor A. Mueller, The Pillowcases, Genevieve Simmons, Juliet Simmons, Steam Powered Giraffe, Brooke Stephenson, Sushio, V is for Villains, Hiromi Wakabayashi, Steven Wallace, and YTCracker.
July 7–9, 2017	Hyatt Regency O'Hare; Rosemont, Illinois	14,374	Misako Aoki, Arc Impulse, Greg Ayres, Morgan Berry, Luci Christian, D.C. Douglas, Sandy Fox, Frenchy and the Punk, Brian Heinz, Takafumi Hori, Chuck Huber, Hiroyuki Imaishi, Kid Yuki and the Otakus, Knight of the Round, Shigeto Koyama, Krazy Krow, Lex Lang, Mason Lieberman, Russell Lissau, Lewis Lovhaug, Josh Martin, David Matranga, Mega Ran, Rob Mungle, Manabu Otsuka, The Pillowcases, Chris Rager, Molly Searcy, Oscar Seung, Yakov Smirnoff, Steam Powered Giraffe, Dave Trosko, V is for Villains, Hiromi Wakabayashi, Billy West, Yoh Yoshinari, and YTCracker.
July 6–8, 2018	Hyatt Regency O'Hare; Rosemont, Illinois	14,500 (est.)	Greg Ayres, Morgan Berry, Luci Christian, Jillian Coglan, Samurai Dan Coglan, D.C. Douglas, Gigi Edgley, Doug Erholtz, Andy Field, Aki Glancy, Brian Heinz, Chuck Huber, Aya Ikeda, Hiroaki Inoue, Kid Yuki and the Otakus, Knight of the Round, Russell Lissau, Lewis Lovhaug, Mega Ran, Trevor A. Mueller, The Pillowcases, Alejandro Saab, Carrie Savage, Molly Searcy, Oscar Seung, Steam Powered Giraffe, Dave Trosko, Gareth West, Greg Wicker, YTCracker, Epic Rap Battles of History, and Gregory Brothers.
July 5–7, 2019	Hyatt Regency O'Hare; Donald E. Stephens Convention Center; Rosemont, Illinois		Greg Ayres, Steve Blum, Luci Christian, Jillian Coglan, Samurai Dan Coglan, Maile Flanagan, Quinton Flynn, Crispin Freeman, Brian Heinz, IA, Kid Yuki and the Otakus, Krazy Krow, Lia, Russell Lissau, Lewis Lovhaug, Yuri Lowenthal, Margaret McDonald, Mary Elizabeth McGlynn, Mega Ran, Trevor A. Mueller, Tara Platt, Raj Ramayya, Oscar Seung, Steam Powered Giraffe, Brooke Stephenson, V is for Villains, Vocamerica, and YTCracker.
July 2–4, 2021	Hyatt Regency O'Hare; Donald E. Stephens Convention Center; Rosemont, Illinois		Awesomus Prime, Greg Ayres, Morgan Berry, Jillian Coglan, Samurai Dan Coglan, Cynthia Cranz, Tod Fennell, Quinton Flynn, Heroes 4 Hire, Chuck Huber, Bryan Massey, Wendy Powell, Whitney Rodgers, John Swasey, V is for Villains, Heather Walker, Kiba Walker, Tyler Walker, Barry Yandell, and YTCracker.
July 1–3, 2022	Hyatt Regency O'Hare; Donald E. Stephens Convention Center; Rosemont, Illinois		Major Attaway, Greg Ayres, Morgan Berry, Jillian Coglan, Samurai Dan Coglan, Dorothy Fahn, Tom Fahn, Cole Feuchter, Quinton Flynn, Tiffany Gordon, Kohei Hattori, Jay Hickman, Marcus M. Mauldin, The Microphone Misfitz, Rob Mungle, Alyson Leigh Rosenfeld, John Swasey, V is for Villains, Heather Walker, Kiba Walker, Tyler Walker, Gareth West, and YTCracker.
July 7–9, 2023	Hyatt Regency O'Hare; Donald E. Stephens Convention Center; Rosemont, Illinois		Arc Impulse, Greg Ayres, Jillian Coglan, Samurai Dan Coglan, Cynthia Cranz, Cole Feuchter, Quinton Flynn, Diana Garnet, Amanda Gish, Kohei Hattori, Jay Hickman, Mason Lieberman, Mint, Shihori Nakane, Tyson Rinehart, Spirit Bomb, V is for Villains, Kiba Walker, Gareth West, and YTCracker.
July 5-7, 2024	Hyatt Regency O'Hare; Donald E. Stephens Convention Center; Rosemont, Illinois		Greg Ayres, Chris Cason, Jillian Coglan, Samurai Dan Coglan, Quinton Flynn, Cris George, Aki Glancy, Kohei Hattori, Brian Mathis, Chris Patton, Raj Ramayya, Oscar Seung, Alan Shires, John Swasey, Gareth West, and Barry Yandell.
July 4-6, 2025	Hyatt Regency O'Hare; Donald E. Stephens Convention Center; Rosemont, Illinois		Greg Ayres, Jessica Cavanagh, Jillian Coglan, Samurai Dan Coglan, Cynthia Cranz, Andy Field, Frenchy and the Punk, Kohei Hattori, Jay Hickman, Kyle Jones, Toshio Maeda, Carey Means, Mega Ran, Rob Mungle, Wendy Powell, Raj Ramayya, Alyson Leigh Rosenfeld, Schäffer the Darklord, John Swasey, Billy West, and Barry Yandell.
July 3-5, 2026	Donald E. Stephens Convention Center; Rosemont, Illinois		Leraldo Anzaldua, Greg Ayres, Chris Cason, Jillian Coglan, Samurai Dan Coglan, Dorothy Fahn, Tom Fahn, Andy Field, Kohei Hattori, Jay Hickman, Bryan Massey, Rob Mungle, Phil Parsons, Mike Pollock, Tyler Walker, Shinichi Watanabe, Barry Yandell, and YTCracker.

== Collaborations ==
In 2012 Anime Midwest sponsored a cosplay prom.

== Controversies ==
Ryan Kopf, the organizer behind Anime Midwest and several other conventions, was banned from Anime Milwaukee during the 2018 convention due to a sexual assault allegation involving the Milwaukee Police Department. Kopf was at the convention as part of Anime Midwest and denies the allegations.

== Gallery ==
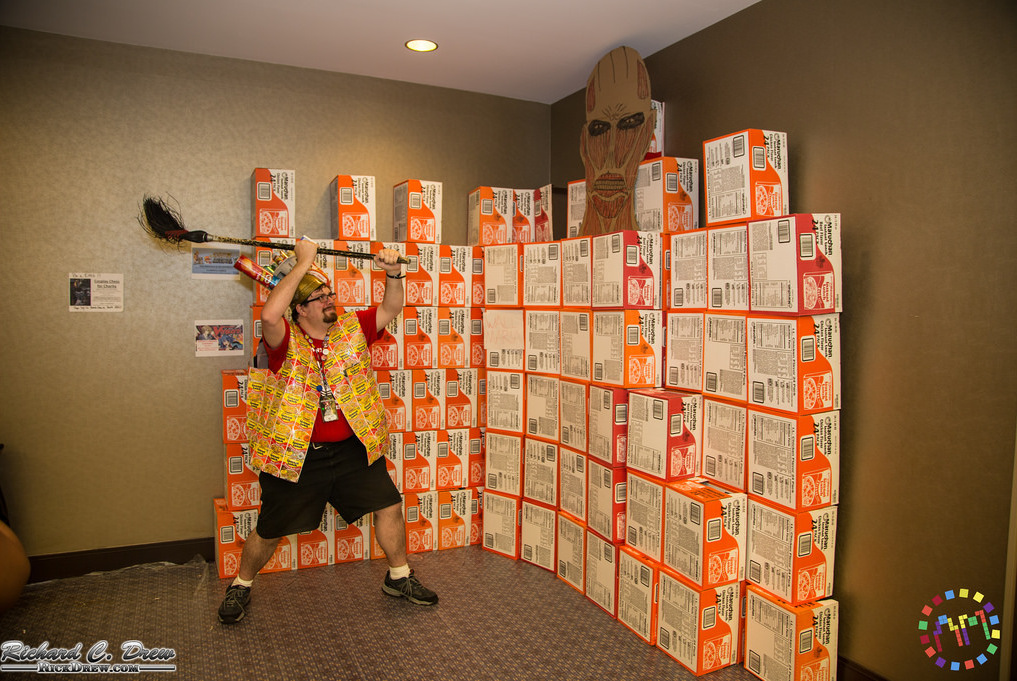
A wall of empty Maruchan ramen noodle boxes with a cardboard figure from Attack on Titan being swatted at by a member of Anime Midwest's staff

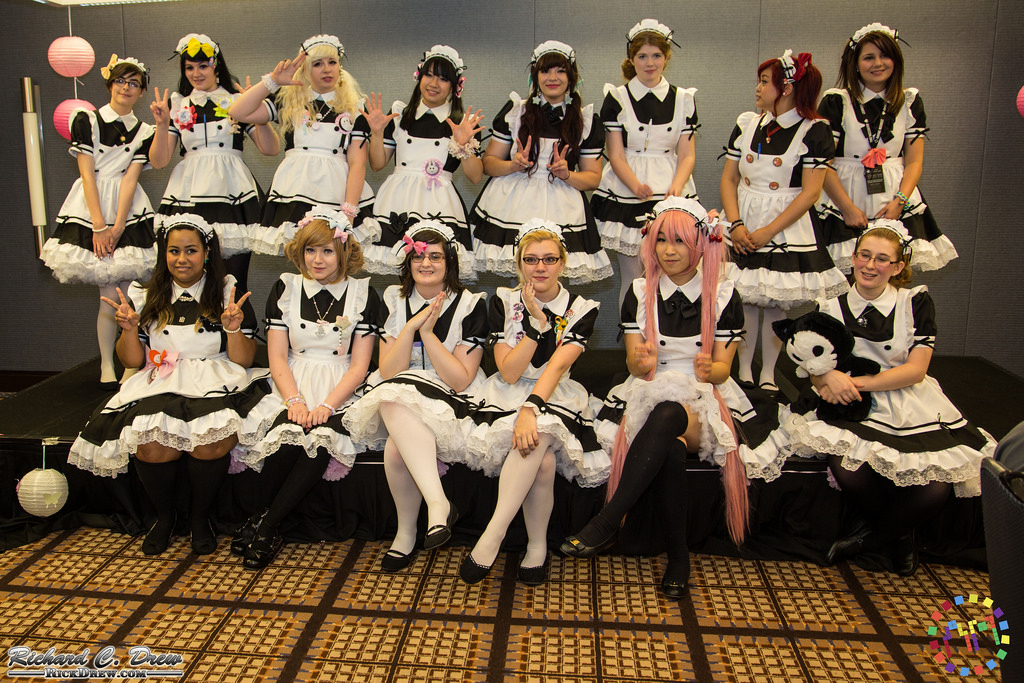
The maids at Anime Midwest's maid cafe

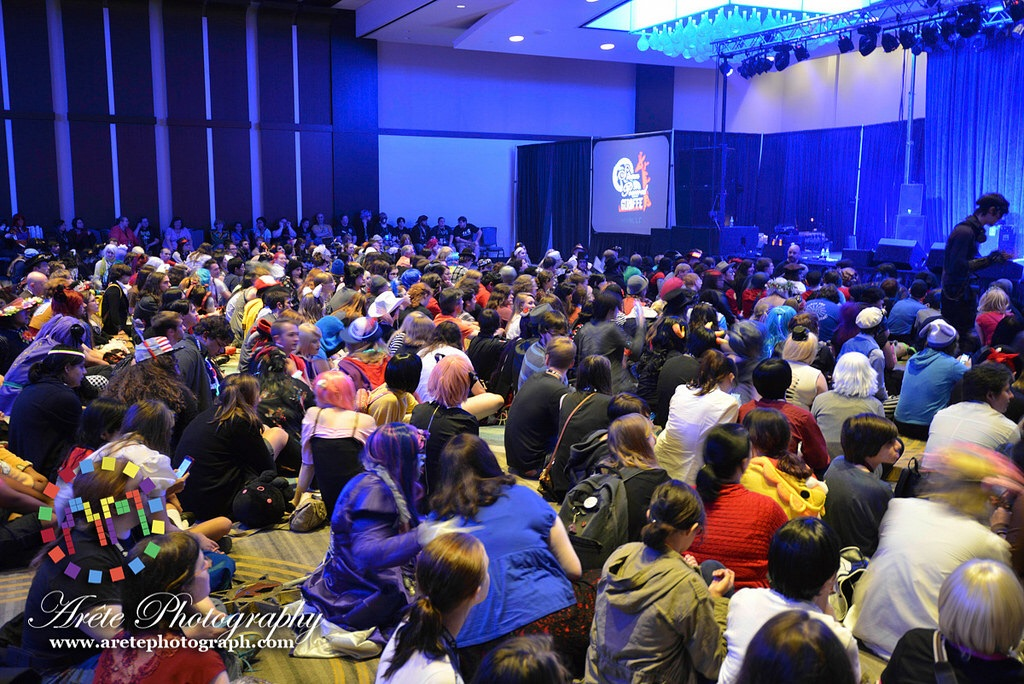
The crowd waiting to see Steam Powered Giraffe perform at Anime Midwest 2014 in the Rosemont Ballroom
