= List of Islamic Society of North America conventions =

The annual convention of the ISNA (Islamic Society of North America) is the largest annual gathering of Muslim Americans to discuss their role in society, politics, public media, activism, educational institutions, etc.

The convention occurs every Labor Day weekend and also include parallel conventions by the Muslim Students' Association (MSA) of North America, the Muslim Youth of North America (MYNA), and The Islamic Medical Association of North America (IMA or IMANA) as well as many other smaller groups associated under the umbrella group ISNA. Attendance in recent years peaked close to 50,000, which is a significant number especially considering the total Muslim population in America is reasonably estimated at 6-7 million. (Other estimates have the number as low as 2 million or as high as 10 million, but these are considered biased estimates).

The convention was held in the following cities in prior years:

- 1963 - First Convention of MSA - Urbana, Illinois
- 1964 - Urbana, Illinois
- 1965 -
- 1966 - Ann Arbor, Michigan
- 1967 - Columbus, Ohio
- 1970 - Green Lake, Wisconsin - Green Lake Conference Center (formerly American Baptist Assembly)
- 1971 - Green Lake, Wisconsin - Green Lake Conference Center (formerly American Baptist Assembly)
- 1972 - St. Charles, Missouri - Lindenwood College
- 1973 - East Lansing, Michigan - Michigan State University
- 1976 - St. Catharines, Ontario - Brock University
- 1977 - Bloomington, Indiana - Indiana University
- 1979 - Oxford, Ohio - Miami University
- 1980 - Oxford, Ohio - Miami University
- 1981 - Bloomington, Indiana - Indiana University
- 1982 - Bloomington, Indiana - Indiana University
- 1983 - First Convention of ISNA - Louisville, Kentucky - Commonwealth Convention Center
- 1984 - Dayton, Ohio - Dayton Convention Center
- 1985 - Louisville, Kentucky
- 1986 - Indianapolis, Indiana
- 1987 - Peoria, Illinois
- 1988 - Indianapolis, Indiana
- 1989 - Dayton, Ohio - Dayton Convention Center
- 1990 - Dayton, Ohio - Dayton Convention Center
- 1991 - Dayton, Ohio - Dayton Convention Center
- 1992 - Kansas City - Kansas City Convention Center
- 1993 - Kansas City - Kansas City Convention Center
- 1994 - Chicago - Chicago Hyatt Regency
- 1995 - Columbus, Ohio - Greater Columbus Convention Center
- 1996 - Columbus, Ohio - Greater Columbus Convention Center
- 1997 - Chicago - Chicago Hilton & Towers
- 1998 - St. Louis, Missouri - St. Louis Convention Center
- 1999 - Chicago - Rosemont Convention Center
- 2000 - Chicago - Rosemont Convention Center
- 2001 - Chicago - Rosemont Convention Center
- 2002 - Washington D.C. - Washington Convention Center
- 2003 - Chicago - Rosemont Convention Center
- 2004 - Chicago - Rosemont Convention Center
- 2005 - Chicago - Rosemont Convention Center
- 2006 - Chicago - Rosemont Convention Center
- 2007 - Chicago - Donald E. Stephens Convention Center (formerly Rosemont Convention Center)
- 2008 - Columbus, Ohio - Greater Columbus Convention Center
- 2009 - Washington D.C. - Walter E. Washington Convention Center
- 2010 - Chicago - Donald E. Stephens Convention Center
- 2011 - Chicago - Donald E. Stephens Convention Center
- 2012 - Washington D.C. - Walter E. Washington Convention Center
- 2013 - Washington D.C. - Walter E. Washington Convention Center
- 2014 - Detroit - Cobo Center
- 2015 - Chicago - Donald E. Stephens Convention Center
- 2016 - Chicago - Donald E. Stephens Convention Center
- 2017 - Chicago - Donald E. Stephens Convention Center
- 2018 - Houston - George R. Brown Convention Center
- 2019 - Houston - George R. Brown Convention Center
- 2020 - scheduled for Chicago but canceled in person and converted to virtual convention due to COVID-19
- 2021 - Virtual convention
- 2022 - Chicago - Donald E. Stephens Convention Center
- 2023 - Chicago - Donald E. Stephens Convention Center
- 2024 - Dallas - Hilton Anatole
- 2025 - Chicago - Donald E. Stephens Convention Center
- 2026 - Detroit - Cobo Center
- 2027 - St. Louis, Missouri - St. Louis Convention Center

(Note: the 2009–2011 were held on the Fourth of July weekend instead of Labor Day weekend to avoid the convention occurring during Ramadan. Similarly, the 2017 convention was also scheduled for the Fourth of July weekend to avoid the convention occurring during the Hajj / Eid al-Adha timeframe).

Convention Themes in Prior Years:

- 1971 The Call of Islam
- 1976 Human Rights in Islam
- 1977 The Islamic Renaissance - its Requirements and Realization
- 1979 Life of the Prophet Mohammad (pbuh) and its Relevance to Muslims in North America
- 1980 Opportunities and Challenges of 15th Century Hijrah
- 1981 Human Rights: An Islamic Perspective
- 1982 Why Islam
- 1983 Islam in North America: Approaches & Methods
- 1984 Islam and You
- 1986 Islam in North America: Directions and Strategies
- 1988 Muslims for Human Dignity
- 1989 Reaching Out with Islam
- 1990 Muslims in 1990s & Beyond: A Community of Solutions
- 1991 Developing an Islamic Environment in North America
- 1992 Shaping Our Future: Knowledge and Action for Building an Islamic Environment
- 1993 Muslims for a Better America
- 1994 Our Youth, Our Family, Our Future
- 1995 Islam: Our Choice
- 1996 Muslims for Peace and Justice
- 1997 Muslims for Moral Excellence
- 1998 Muslims for Human Dignity
- 1999 Islam: Guidance for Humanity
- 2000 Islam: Faith & Civilization
- 2001 Strength through Diversity
- 2002 Islam: A Call for Peace and Justice
- 2003 Islam: Enduring Values for Daily life
- 2004 Islam: Dialogue, Devotion and Development
- 2005 Muslims in NA: Accomplishments, Challenges and the Road Ahead
- 2006 Achieving Balance in faith, Family and Community
- 2007 Upholding Faith and Serving Humanity
- 2008 Ramadan: A Time for Change
- 2009 Life, Liberty, and the pursuit of happiness
- 2010 Nurturing Compassionate Communities
- 2011 Loving God, Loving Neighbor, Living in Harmony
- 2012 One Nation Under God: Striving for the Common Good
- 2013 Envisioning a More Perfect Union: Building the Beloved Community
- 2014 Generations Rise: Elevating Muslim American Culture
- 2015 Stories of Resilience: Strengthening the American Muslim Narrative
- 2016 Turning Points: Navigating Challenges, Seizing Opportunities
- 2017 Hope and Guidance through the Quran
- 2018 In God We Trust
- 2019 What's your super power for social good?
- 2020 The Struggle for Social and Racial Justice: A Moral Imperative
- 2021 Reimagine & Rebuild with Renewed Resolve
- 2022 Resilience, Hope, & Faith: With Hardship, Comes Ease
- 2023 60 Years of Service: Navigating the Way Forward!
- 2024 The Muslim American: Forging Faith & Action
- 2025 Renewing the American Spirit: Prophetic Ideals for Challenging Times
- 2026 Persevere, Interconnect, Be God conscious, Strengthen each other for true prosperity
