= Islamic Society of North America =

Muslim organization in North America

- Abbreviation: ISNA
- Formation: 1963–1981 (as the Muslim Students' Association); 1981 (present form)
- Type: 501(c)(3) organization
- Tax ID no.: 31-1054012
- Purpose: "To be an exemplary and unifying Islamic organization in North America that contributes to the betterment of the Muslim community and society at large."
- Headquarters: Plainfield, Indiana, United States
- Region served: North America
- President: Syed Imtiaz Ahmad
- Website: isna.net

The Islamic Society of North America (ISNA) is a non-profit Muslim religious organization based in the United States and serving North America. It provides a number of programs and services to North America's Muslim communities and broader societies. ISNA holds an annual convention that is generally regarded as the largest regulated gathering of Muslims in the United States. It is headquartered in Plainfield, Indiana. The organization has been subject to various controversies throughout its existence.

== History ==
=== Founding ===
ISNA traces its origins to a meeting of a group of international students at the University of Illinois Urbana-Champaign in 1963, during which the Muslim Students Association was formed. ISNA regards the MSA's 1963 convention at the University of Illinois Urbana-Champaign as its first one.

=== Headquarters ===
In 1963, the MSA invited Pakistani-Canadian architect Dr. Gulzar Haider to design a headquarters mosque for the Plainfield society. Haider "eschewed minarets, domes and other hallmarks of Islamic architecture to focus on geometry." In 1981, the mosque was completed, featuring "prayer space, a library, and administrative offices." It was in use by the following year.

The present-day ISNA was founded in 1982 through a joint effort of four organizations: The Muslim Students Association of the US and Canada (The MSA), Islamic Medical Association (IMA), the Association of Muslim Social Scientists (AMSS), and the Association of Muslim Scientists and Engineers (AMSE) - to create a community-oriented organization due to the changing nature of the growing Muslim community. Many of the leaders of these four founding organizations took on roles in the newly formed ISNA. In 1983, ISNA's multi-million dollar headquarters was completed in Plainfield, Indiana, using funds raised in part from international sources.

==== Structure ====
ISNA is composed of a General Assembly, Board of Directors, Executive Committee, Directorate, Advisory Council, and Committees.

Since 1982, ISNA's structure has changed, with several organizations either becoming defunct, or simply leaving ISNA's umbrella. Currently, ISNA includes under its umbrella: Muslim Student Association (MSA), the North American Islamic Trust (NAIT), Canadian Islamic Trust Foundation (CITF; NAIT's counterpart in Canada), Association of Muslim Scientists and Engineers (AMSE), Islamic Medical Association of North America (IMANA), and the Muslim Youth of North America (MYNA). Other organizations that either left ISNA or were disbanded include: Muslim Communities Association (MCA), Islamic Teaching Center (ITC), the Association of Muslim Social Scientists (AMSS), Islamic Media Foundation (IMF), and Foundation for International Development (FID), among others. Although each of the umbrella groups under ISNA has a seat in the ISNA Board of Directors, ISNA itself has no reciprocal seat or say in the leadership of the lower umbrella groups.

== Services ==
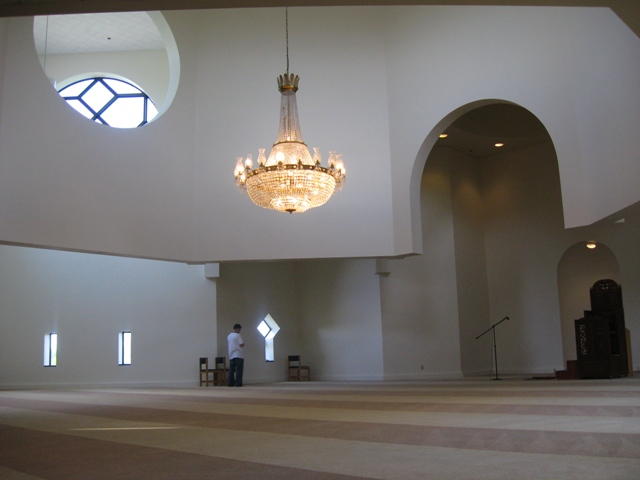
Interior of ISNA mosque

ISNA's vision is "to be an exemplary and unifying Islamic organization in North America that contributes to the betterment of the Muslim community and society at large." ISNA provides a common platform for presenting Islam, supports Muslim communities, develops educational, social and outreach programs, and fosters good relations with other religious communities, and civic and service organizations.

ISNA provides various services for Muslims in North America. Services include annual conventions, education forums, youth programs, chaplain support, scholarships, an award-winning magazine, and more. ISNA also offers individual membership on an annual basis and lifetime basis for sustaining donors.

ISNA's annual convention, typically on the Labor Day weekend in early September, is generally regarded as the largest annual gathering of American Muslims in the United States. The convention is often held in Chicago, Illinois, where it features Islamic lectures, discussions, debates, nasheeds, and Muslim comedy. A notable comedian who has repeatedly performed at ISNA is Azhar Usman. In 2012, the ISNA Convention was held in Washington, D.C. Deputy U.S. Attorney General, Thomas Perez, addressed the 2012 Convention, and other prominent representatives of the White House have attended in the past, including Valerie Jarrett, President Obama's Senior Advisor for Engagement and International Affairs in 2009 and Homeland Security Secretary Jeh Johnson in 2016. Joe Biden also addressed the ISNA convention in 2020, prior to his presidency.

Islamic Horizons is ISNA's bi-monthly publication, which comments on global issues and current events. It also highlights the strides being made by American Muslims in various fields.

On August 30, 2013, Tahera Ahmad became the first woman to open an ISNA convention with a recitation of the Quran, which she did at the 50th Annual ISNA Convention in front of a mixed-gender audience.

== Interfaith dialogue ==
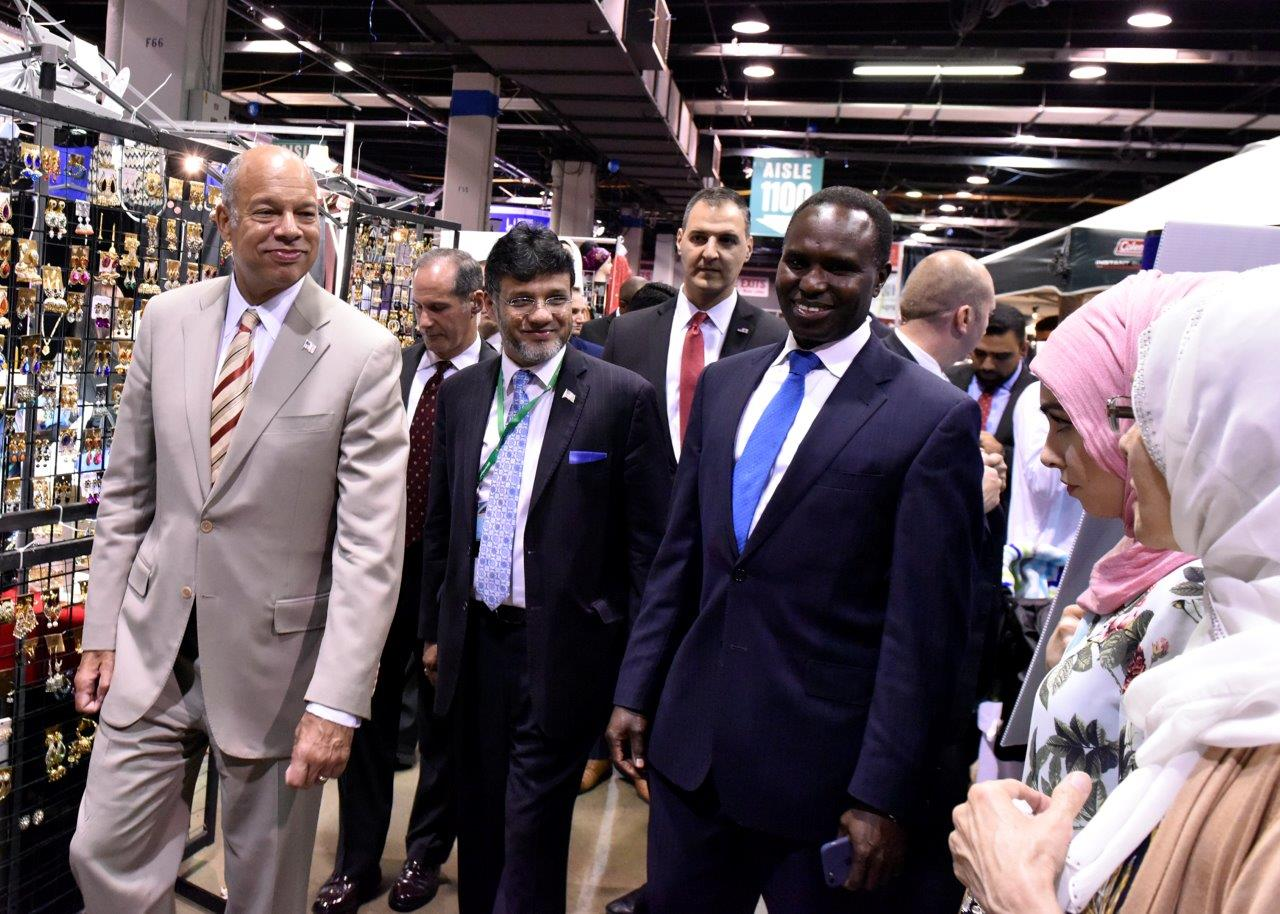
Department of Homeland Security Secretary Jeh Johnson at the ISNA Annual Convention in Chicago in September 2016

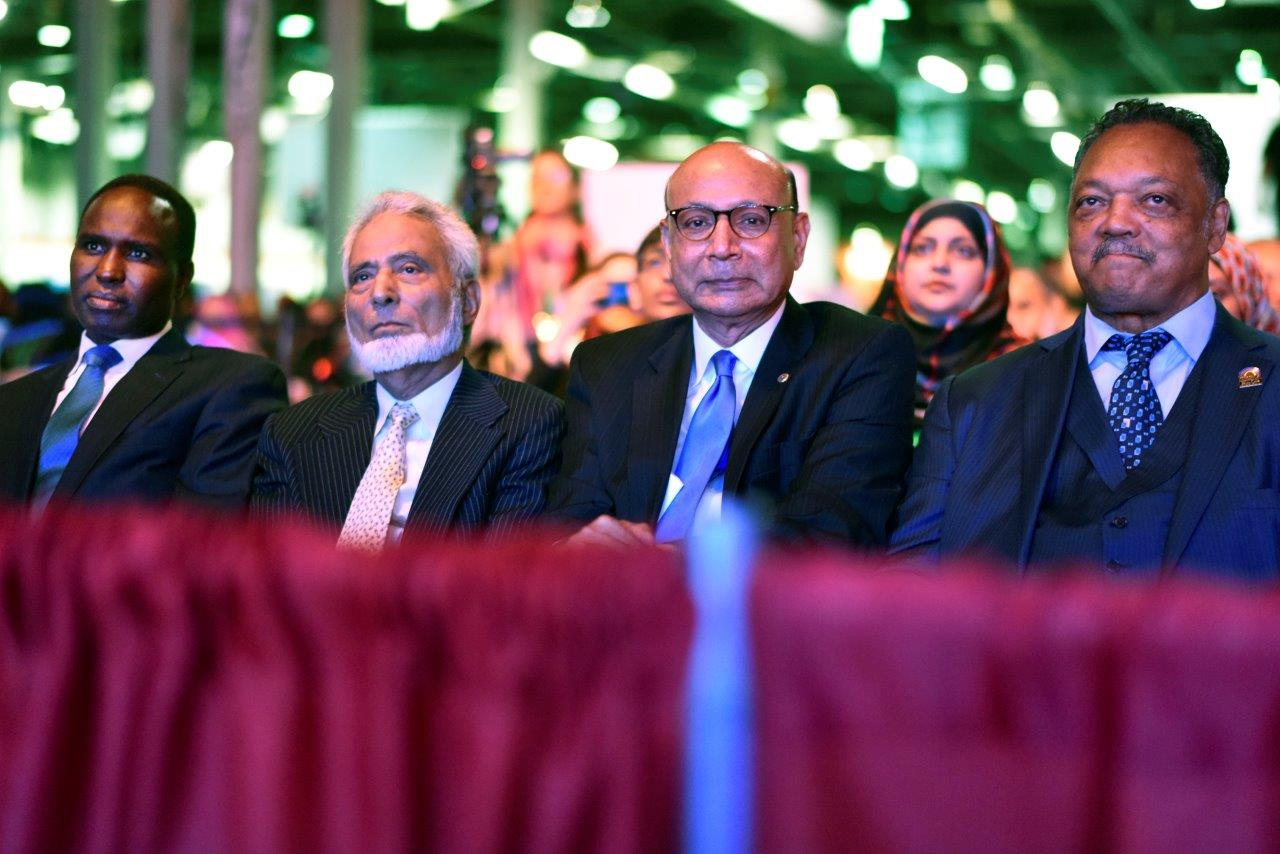
Civil rights activist Jesse Jackson at the ISNA Annual Convention

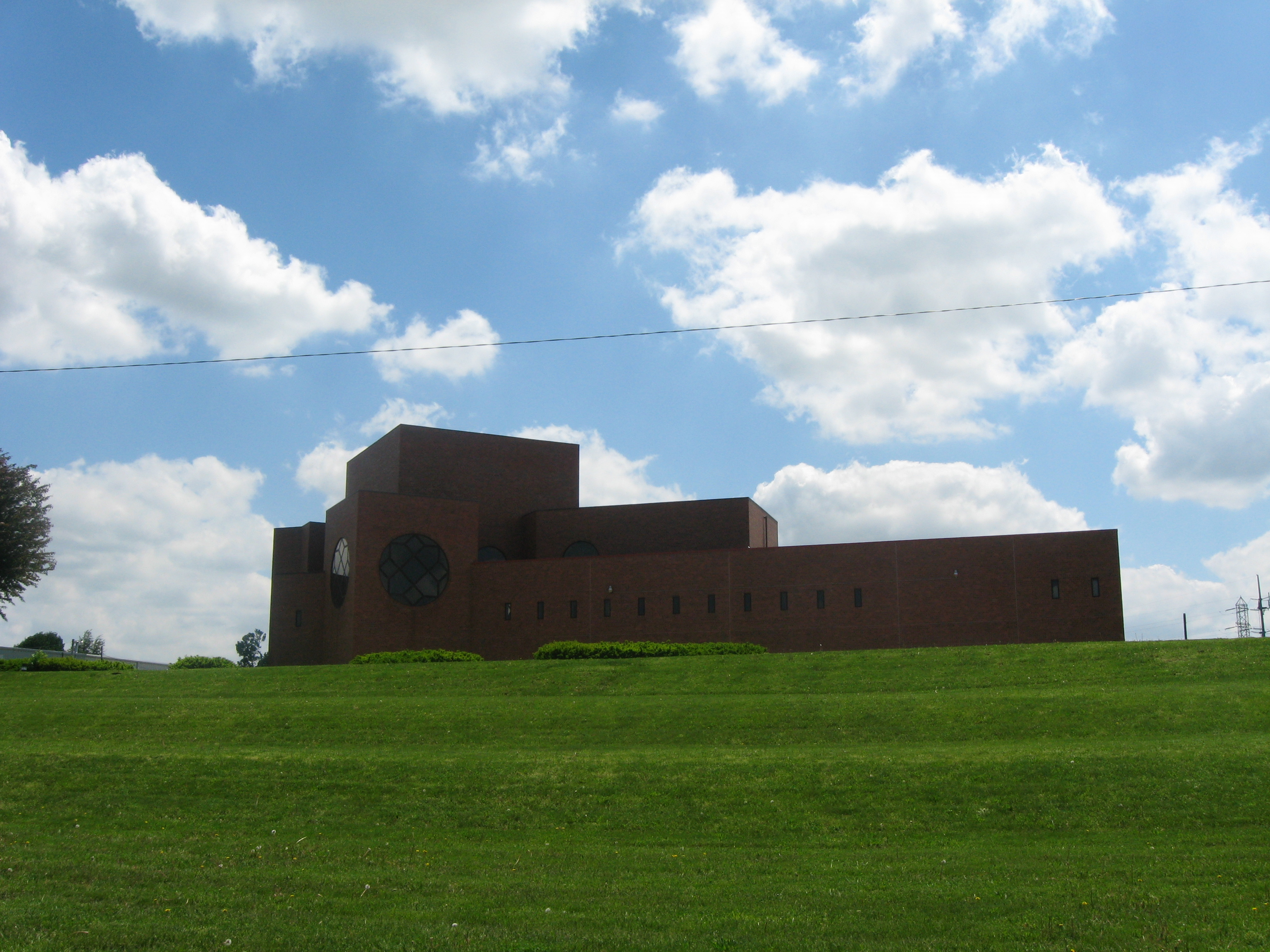
ISNA building, Plainfield, Indiana

In 2007, ISNA invited Eric Yoffie, an American rabbi and the president of the Union for Reform Judaism, to speak before the organization's 44th annual meeting, where Yoffie denounced Islamophobia and called for Jews and Muslims to unite in pursuit of a two-state solution to bring an end to the Israeli–Palestinian conflict. Earlier, ISNA had condemned Hamas and Hezbollah for terrorism and endorsed the two-state solution as well, which were "key factors" in Yoffie's decision to engage with ISNA. Yoffie's speech drew frequent applause and a standing ovation from the crowd. David Harris, the executive director of the American Jewish Committee, criticized Yoffie as the voice of a "discredited group eager for mainstream recognition."

In 2009, ISNA invited Rick Warren, an American pastor, to address the annual convention. Rabbis and evangelical and Catholic figures were also present.

ISNA has also engaged with the U.S. Bishops' Committee for Ecumenical and Interreligious Affairs.

In 2016, ISNA and the American Jewish Committee formed the Muslim-Jewish Advisory Council to address the rising rates of antisemitism and Islamophobia across the United States.

== Controversies ==
=== Alleged ties to extremists ===
Former U.S. Senator Jon Kyl (R-AZ) said that the Islamic Society of North America is "accused of ties to Islamic extremists." Investigative journalist Steven Emerson accused ISNA of ties to terrorism and argued that ISNA is not as moderate as some "would like to believe." Others, such as rabbi Marc Schneier, argue ISNA and other Islamic groups are too often condemned because of "extreme outliers."

=== Allegations of terrorism financing (2003–2007) ===
ISNA was one of a number of Muslim groups investigated by US law enforcement for possible terrorist connections. Its tax records were requested in December 2003 by the Senate Finance Committee. However, the committee's investigation concluded in November 2005 having found no evidence of ties to terrorists. Committee chairman Charles Grassley said, "We did not find anything alarming enough that required additional follow-up beyond what law enforcement is already doing."

In the 2007 Holy Land Foundation terrorist financing case, the United States Department of Justice named ISNA, along with Council on American-Islamic Relations (CAIR), the North American Islamic Trust (NAIT), as an unindicted co-conspirator and one of a number of "entities who are and/or were members of the US Muslim Brotherhood." ISNA, along with NAIT and CAIR, filed motions seeking to be removed from the UCC listing, and the District Judge found that the government had violated the organizations' rights by publicly listing them as Unindicted Co-Conspirators. However, the judge did not remove ISNA from the list, ruling that prosecutors provided “ample evidence to establish the association” of ISNA to Hamas.

=== Other controversies ===
In his testimony before the US Senate in October 2003, Michael Waller referred to ISNA as a Saudi-supported organization, noted that it "certifies Wahhabi-trained chaplains" for U.S. prisons, and argued that it sought to impose "Wahhabi religious conformity" on the American Muslim community.

Warith Deen Umar, an imam from New York and a speaker at the 2009 ISNA national convention, asserted that the Jews were to blame for the Holocaust, stating: "They were punished for a reason, because they were serially disobedient to Allah." He further went on to claim, in light of the endorsement by American president Barack Obama of two Jewish men for official positions at the White House, that Jews "control the world." Umar had also previously referred to the September 11 hijackers as "martyrs" and published a book titled "Judaiology" discussing the "inordinacy of Jewish power" and stating that Jews "play mind games" to deceive non-Jews. In response to his comments, ISNA president Ingrid Mattison stated: "We would like to set the record straight and state our complete rejection of all prejudicial views and bigoted stances toward the Jewish community and any other community of faith."

At the July 2017 annual convention of ISNA, representatives from "Muslims for Progressive Values" and Human Rights Campaign (LGBT civil rights groups) were asked to shut down their booth and leave, given "that the convention was a religious, private, and family-oriented event."

== See also ==
- ISNA Canada
- Islamic Circle of North America (ICNA)
- Muslim American Society (MAS)
- Council on American Islamic Relations (CAIR)
