= North American Islamic Trust =

Trustee of Islamic centers, mosques and schools in the US

North American Islamic Trust (NAIT)
- Type: Private; not-for-profit; tax-exempt organization under Section 501(c)(3) of the Internal Revenue Code
- Founded: Plainfield, Indiana, US (1973)
- Founder: Muslim Students Association
- Headquarters: Oak Brook, IL, US
- Area served: US
- Parent: Islamic Society of North America
- Subsidiaries: Allied Asset Advisors; American Trust Publications; Islamic Book Service
- Website: nait.net

The North American Islamic Trust (NAIT) is based in Plainfield, Indiana, owns Islamic properties and promotes waqf (Islamic endowments) in North America. Founded by immigrants who arrived in the US during the 1960s, NAIT has roots in the Muslim Students Association. In the 1970s and thereafter, NAIT helped provide college students with worship services.

Today, NAIT serves as the trustee of about 200 Islamic centers, mosques and schools. The properties of those mosques are estimated to be worth in the hundreds of millions of dollars.

== Background ==
NAIT was established in 1973 in Indiana by the Muslim Students Association (MSA) of the United States and Canada, by some of the same Muslim Brotherhood members who started the MSA. ISNA's President, Dr. Ingrid Mattson, is a former member of the NAIT board of directors. A sister organization under the same name registered a few years later in the Canadian province of Ontario.

== Financial services ==
=== Financing mosques and Islamic schools ===
NAIT offers waqf protection to properties of mosques, safeguards these community assets, and ensures their conformity to Islamic purposes. According to a report by the Council on American-Islamic Relations (CAIR), in 2000 NAIT funded an estimated 27% of the 1,209 mosques in the US. NAIT held title to over 320 properties as of June 2003. Title to about one in four mosques in the US are held by NAIT. NAIT does not monitor, manage, or supervise any mosque, community center, school, or place of worship.

NAIT facilitates the establishment of mosques (such as the Dar Al Hijrah Islamic Center, the grounds of which were purchased on June 19, 1983, by NAIT) and Islamic schools by extending limited interest-free loans to needy communities from its investment venture called the Islamic Centers Cooperative Fund (ICCF). About 8% of this fund goes annually to support local communities acquiring and improving mosques. The remainder is placed in real estate and other investments.

NAIT does not provide any financial or other monetary support to the Muslim Student Association.

== Controversy ==
In 2007, federal prosecutors brought charges against Holy Land Foundation for allegedly funding terrorist activities of Hamas and other Islamic terrorist organizations. NAIT was named as an unindicted co-conspirator in the case, along with the Council on American-Islamic Relations (CAIR) and ISNA. The Al Ahram Weekly said American "Muslims [were] witnessing a smear campaign", insisting instead that the named groups "represent the viewpoints and interests of the mainstream American Muslim community."

In 2009, U.S. District Court Judge Jorge Solis found that the Justice Department violated the Fifth Amendment rights of the NAIT and CAIR in 2007 by not sealing the list. At the same time, Solis said that there was "ample evidence to establish the association" of NAIT with Hamas.

On October 20, 2010, Judges Garza, Benavides, and Crone of the Fifth Circuit Court of Appeals found that the U.S. Department of Justice violated the Fifth Amendment rights of NAIT, and by implication the rights of more than 300 similarly named Muslim organizations and individuals when it failed to seal the unindicted co-conspirator list. The court ruled that inclusion on the list was the result of "simply an untested allegation of the Government made in anticipation of a possible evidentiary dispute that never came to pass." While the panel agreed portions of Solis' ruling "went too far", it refused to strike the organization from the list.
