= Impact Field =

Baseball park in Rosemont, Illinois, US

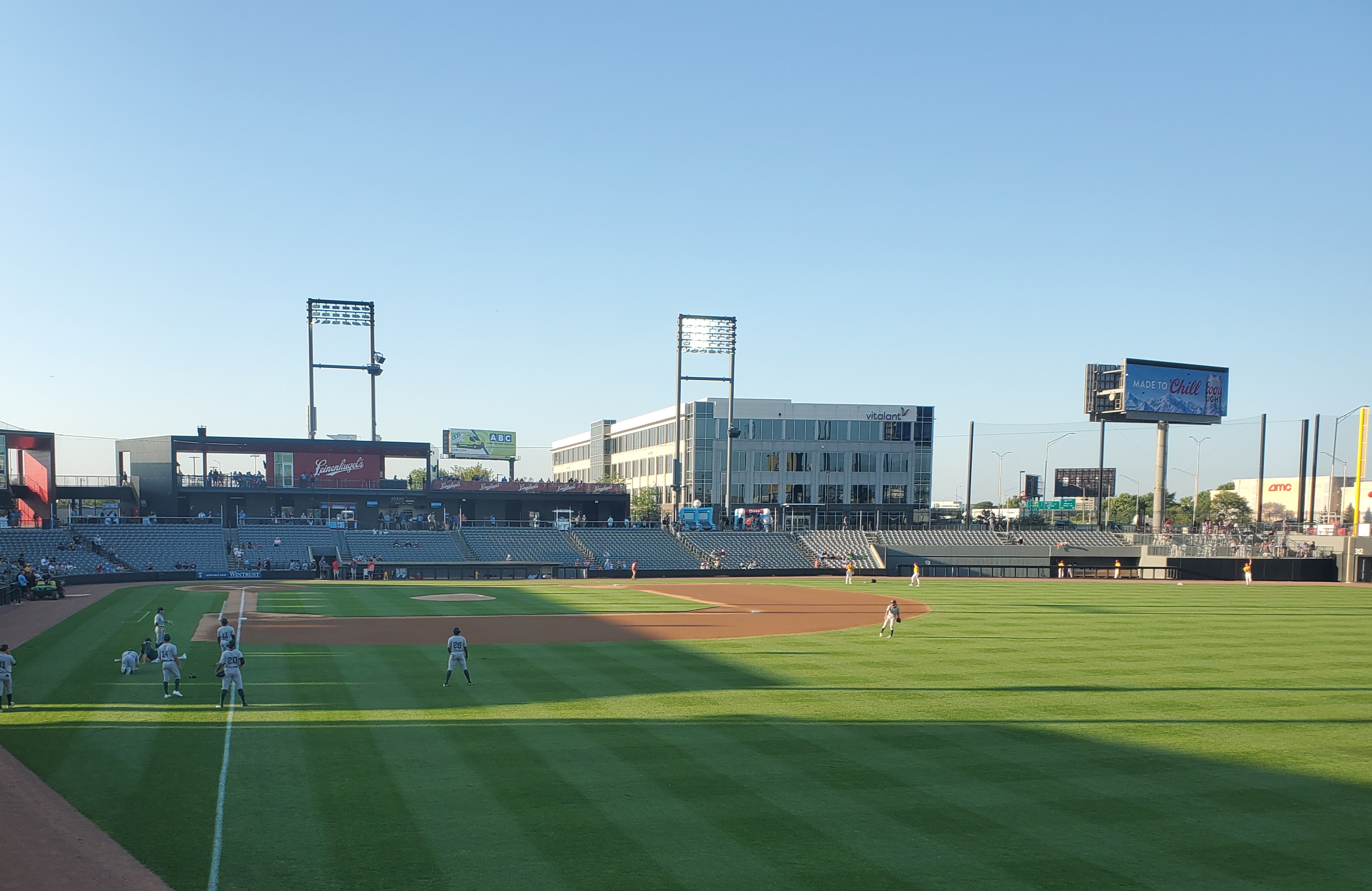
- Interactive map of Impact Field
- Location: 9850 Balmoral Ave, Rosemont, Illinois, U.S.
- Coordinates: 41°58′42″N 87°52′18″W
- Owner: Village of Rosemont
- Capacity: Baseball: 8,300; Concerts: 10,000
- Surface: Grass
- Field size: Left Field: 312 feet (95 m); Center Field: 390 feet (120 m); Right Field: 294 feet (90 m)
- Public transit: NCS at Rosemont

Construction
- Opened: May 25, 2018; 8 years ago
- Cost: $60 million
- Architect: AECOM
- Structural engineer: TGRWA

Tenant
- Chicago Dogs (AA) (2018–present)

Website
- rosemont.com/impact-field/

Impact Field is a baseball park in Rosemont, Illinois, U.S., which is part of the Chicago metropolitan area. It is the home of the Chicago Dogs, an independent league baseball team playing in the American Association of Independent Professional Baseball. It is located near O'Hare International Airport, as well as Allstate Arena, the Donald E. Stephens Convention Center, and the Fashion Outlets of Chicago.

In 2013, Bradley Stephens, the mayor of Rosemont, proposed the area of where Impact Field is now located as a possible site for a new Chicago Cubs stadium.

In September 2017, Impact Networking, a provider of business technology services, purchased the naming rights to the ballpark, then under construction, for a 12-year period, for an undisclosed sum.

The ballpark seats 8,300 people for baseball, and it opened in 2018. It features a double-sided digital scoreboard, which is visible to more than 70 million cars that travel on Interstate 294 each year.

The Chicago Dogs played their first game at Impact Field on May 25, 2018. They lost to the visiting Kansas City T-Bones, 8–4, in front of 6,317 people.
