= National Sports Collectors Convention =

Sports convention in the United States

National Sports Collectable Convention "The National"
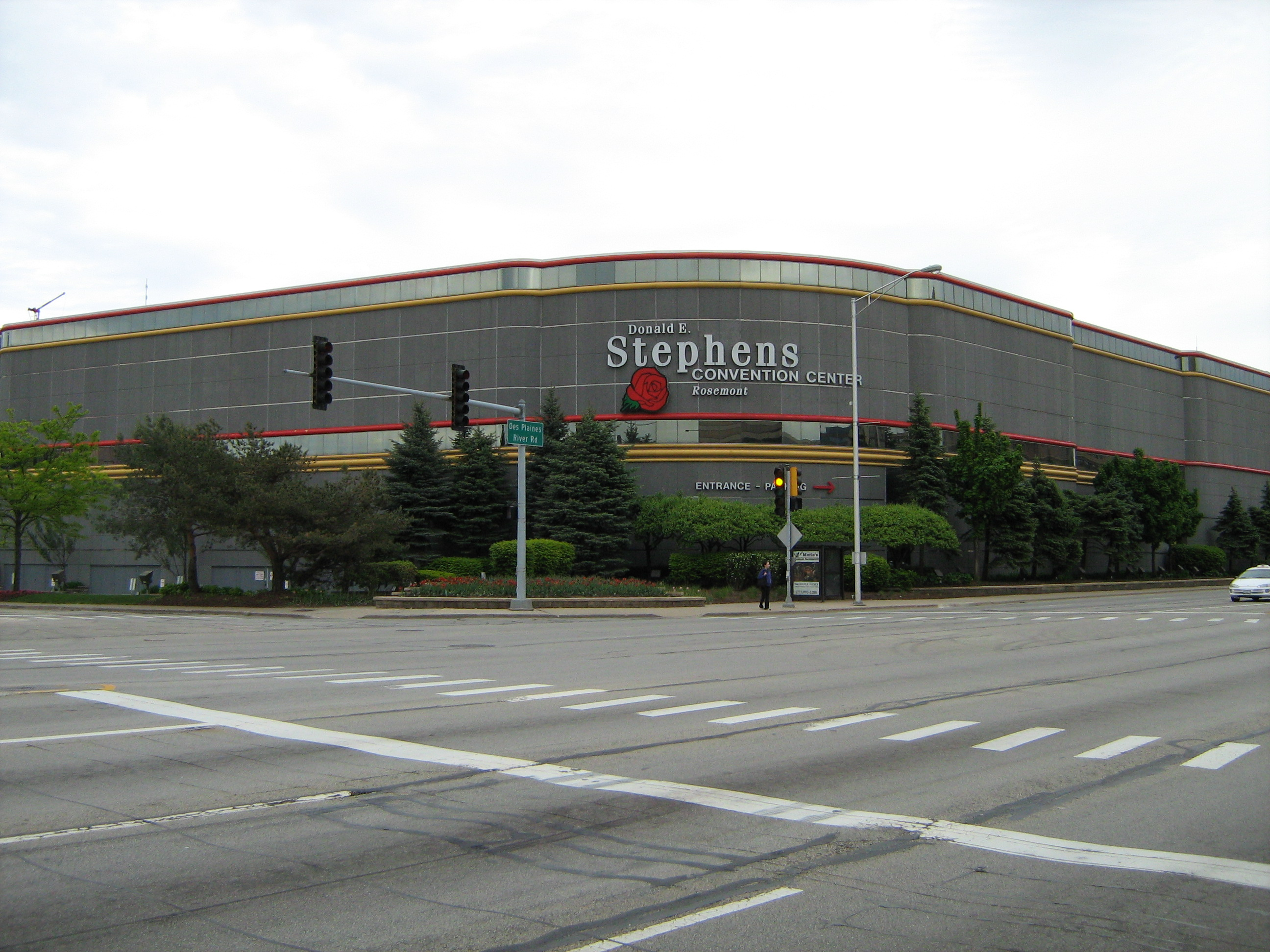
- The Donald E. Stephens Convention Center in 2009
- Locations: Donald E. Stephens Convention Center; 5555 N. River Road; Rosemont, Illinois 60018
- Coordinates: 41°58′45″N 87°51′35″W

The National Sports Collectors Convention is an annual trade show held in the United States devoted to sports memorabilia. Also known as The National, the convention has been held annually since 1980.

It is considered to be among the largest and most well known sports collector shows, as the 2021 show drew approximately 100,000 attendees.

== History ==
The National started in 1980, when a small handful of sports card collectors convened at a hotel located adjacent to the Los Angeles International Airport.
