= AMCC =

AMCC is a four-letter abbreviation which may refer to:

- Applied Micro Circuits Corporation, a semiconductor company
- Allegheny Mountain Collegiate Conference, an intercollegiate athletic conference affiliated with the NCAA's Division III
- Al-Madinah Cultural Center, a non-profit cultural student organization at the University of Minnesota
- Aviators Model Code of Conduct, a publication and project providing voluntary flight safety guidance
- Amikom Computer Club, the computer organization in STMIK Amikom Yogyakarta
- Anterior cingulate cortex, subregion
