= Bradley Stephens =

American politician from Illinois

Brad Stephens

Member of the Illinois House of Representatives from the 20th district
- Incumbent
- Assumed office June 29, 2019
- Preceded by: Michael P. McAuliffe

Village President of Rosemont, Illinois
- Incumbent
- Assumed office May 1, 2007
- Preceded by: Donald E. Stephens

Supervisor of Leyden Township, Illinois
- In office May 1993 – May 2013
- Preceded by: Angelo “Skip” Saviano
- Succeeded by: Joseph Ponzio

Personal details
- Born: February 5, 1963 (age 63) Chicago
- Party: Republican
- Other political affiliations: Rosemont Voters' League
- Spouse: Suzi Stephens
- Parent: Donald Stephens (father) Estelle "Pat" Stephens (mother)
- Education: East Leyden High School
- Profession: Politician
- Website: repstephens.com

Bradley A. Stephens is a Republican Party politician currently serving as state representative from the 20th district within the Illinois General Assembly and chief elected executive of Rosemont.

Stephens was appointed to his seat in the Illinois House of Representatives on June 29, 2019, to replace Michael P. McAuliffe, and won election to a full term in the Illinois House of Representatives in 2020. He has served as the village president of Rosemont since being appointed in 2007 after the death of his father, Donald Stephens, who had served as village president, and has since been elected to three full four-year terms.

Stephens has also served as a member of the Illinois State Toll Highway Authority board of directors, the Leyden Township supervisor (an elected position), a member of the Pace board of directors, and a Rosemont village trustee (an elected position). Stephens serves as the elected Republican committeeperson for Leyden Township.

== Early life and family ==
Stephens was born on February 5, 1963. Stephens' family is highly influential in Rosemont, Illinois' government. Stephens' father Donald Stephens was a founder of the village, and, until his death in 2007, served as its first village president. As of 2010, the Stephens family had ten family members on the village's payroll, cumulatively earning nearly $1 million in annual salary. At that time, five members of his family were elected officials in the city.

Stephens' mother was Estelle “Pat” Stephens (née Patronski). She died in 2020.

== Early career ==
In 1989, Stephens became a Rosemont village trustee, an elected position. He would continue to hold this position for 18 years, until he was appointed mayor in 2007.

Stephens also served as Leyden Township supervisor, an elected position. He would hold this position until 2013. Stephen's opted to run for reelection in 2012 and was succeeded in 2013 by Joseph Thomas.

Stephens has served as the Leyden Township Republican Party committeeperson, an elected party position. He has won election to this position every four years since 2006 by a vote of those participating in the Republican primaries.

== Rosemont village presidency (2007–present) ==
Stephens was appointed village president of Rosemont by the Village of Rosemont Board of Trustees on May 1, 2007, two weeks after his father, Donald Stephens, died in office. He was sworn in on May 6. He was elected to a full term in 2009 with 91% of the vote, and has been reelected as village president in 2013, 2017, and 2021.

Flag of Rosemont

While mayor, he has continued to serve as the Leyden Township Republican Party committeeperson. He also, until 2013, continued to serve as Leyden Township supervisor.

Stephens earns a $260,000 salary as mayor, making him one of the highest-paid mayors.

Stephens was a member of the Pace board of directors.

Among the major developments that came to the village during Stephens' tenure was the Fashion Outlets of Chicago, which opened in 2013.

Stephens sought to lure the Chicago Cubs Major League Baseball team to build a new stadium for the team in the village, offering to, free-of-charge, give them 25 acres of land in the village to the west of the Interstate 294 and south of Balmoral Avenue. The village offered hundreds of millions of dollars in tax incentives to the team. This came amid negotiations between the city of Chicago and the Cubs over proposed renovations to the team's existing stadium, Wrigley Field. The Chicago Cubs ultimately remained at Wrigley Field, undertaking renovations. Stephens would bring a professional baseball stadium to the village in the form of the form of Impact Field, which opened in 2018 as the home of the Chicago Dogs independent baseball team.

Stephens was appointed as a member of the Illinois State Toll Highway Authority's board of directors in June 2018. His tenure on this board of directors would be relatively brief.

== Member of the Illinois House of Representatives (2019–present) ==
Stephens was appointed to serve as the member of the Illinois House of Representatives from the 20th district on June 29, 2019, filling the seat previously held by Michael P. McAuliffe.

The 20th district includes all or parts of Des Plaines, Park Ridge, Rosemont, Schiller Park, Norridge, Harwood Heights, Franklin Park, and the Chicago neighborhoods of Edison Park, Norwood Park, and O'Hare. Stephens is the only elected Republican representing a significant portion of Chicago in the Illinois General Assembly, and indeed the only elected Republican representing a significant portion of Chicago above the county level.

In the 2019–20 session (the 101st Illinois General Assembly), he served on the Appropriations-Elementary & Secondary Education; Cybersecurity, Data Analytics, & IT; Health Care Licenses; Financial Institutions; Veterans' Affairs; and Mental Health committees.

Stephens was elected to a full term in the Illinois House of Representatives in 2020. In his reelection campaign, he painted himself as standing against Democratic Party political boss Michael Madigan, and tied his Democratic opponent, Michelle Darbro, to Madigan (who, indeed, had been giving her campaign financial backing). Despite being a Republican, Stephens himself had past ties to Madigan, as he had once been a significant donor to Madigan. Democrats attacked Stephens for accepting political contributions to his reelection campaign from red light camera contractors.

In the 2020–21 session (the 102nd Illinois General Assembly), he is serving on the Appropriations-Elementary & Secondary Education; Cybersecurity, Data Analytics, & IT; Financial Institutions; Health Care Licenses; Mental Health; and Veterans' Affairs committees.

== Personal life ==
Stephens lives in Rosemont with his wife, Suzi. Stephens is the father of five children.

== Electoral history ==
=== Rosemont village Trustee ===
1993 Village of Rosemont Trustees elections (3 seats)
| Party | Candidate | Votes | % |
|---|---|---|---|
| | L. Clemmensen | | |
| | Bradley A. Stephens (incumbent) | | |
| | Emmett Michael | | |
| Total votes | | | 100 |

2001 Village of Rosemont Trustees elections (3 seats)
| Party | Candidate | Votes | % |
|---|---|---|---|
| Rosemont Voters' League | Bradley A. Stephens (incumbent) | 755 | 34.4 |
| Rosemont Voters' League | Emmett Michael (incumbent) | 726 | 33.1 |
| Rosemont Voters' League | William J. Przybylski | 715 | 32.60 |
| Total votes | | 2,196 | 100 |

2005 Village of Rosemont Trustees elections (3 seats)
| Party | Candidate | Votes | % |
|---|---|---|---|
| Rosemont Voters' League | Bradley A. Stephens (incumbent) | 685 | 34.35 |
| Rosemont Voters' League | Sharon Pappas | 655 | 32.85 |
| Rosemont Voters' League | Ralph DiMatteeo | 654 | 32.80 |
| Total votes | | 1,994 | 100 |

=== Leyden Township Supervisor ===
2001 Leyden Township Supervisor election
| Party | Candidate | Votes | % |
|---|---|---|---|
| Republican | Bradley A. Stephens (incumbent) | 11,169 | 100 |
| Total votes | | 11,169 | 100 |

2005 Leyden Township Supervisor election
| Party | Candidate | Votes | % |
|---|---|---|---|
| Republican | Bradley A. Stephens (incumbent) | 7,880 | 100 |
| Total votes | | 7,880 | 100 |

2009 Leyden Township Supervisor election
| Party | Candidate | Votes | % |
|---|---|---|---|
| Republican | Bradley A. Stephens (incumbent) | 9,446 | 100 |
| Turnout | | 9,446 | 20.87 |

=== Rosemont Village President ===
2009 Village of Rosemont President election
| Party | Candidate | Votes | % |
|---|---|---|---|
| Rosemont Voters' League | Bradley A. Stephens (incumbent) | 998 | 91.06 |
| Independent | Joseph E. Watrach | 98 | 8.94 |
| Turnout | | 1096 | 21 |

2013 Village of Rosemont President election
| Party | Candidate | Votes | % |
|---|---|---|---|
| Rosemont Voters' League | Bradley A. Stephens (incumbent) | 719 | 100.0 |
| Turnout | | 719 | 19 |

2017 Village of Rosemont President election
| Party | Candidate | Votes | % |
|---|---|---|---|
| Rosemont Voters' League | Bradley A. Stephens (incumbent) | 694 | 100.0 |
| Turnout | | 694 | 18 |

2021 Village of Rosemont President election
| Party | Candidate | Votes | % |
|---|---|---|---|
| Rosemont Voters' League | Bradley A. Stephens (incumbent) | 616 | 100.0 |
| Turnout | | 616 | 16 |

2025 Village of Rosemont President election
| Party | Candidate | Votes | % |
|---|---|---|---|
| Rosemont Voters' League | Bradley A. Stephens (incumbent) | 613 | 100.0 |
| Turnout | | 613 | 17.40 |

=== Leyden Township Republican Committeeperson ===
2010 Leyden Township Republican Committeeman election
| Party | Candidate | Votes | % |
|---|---|---|---|
| Republican | Bradley A. Stephens (incumbent) | 3,854 | 100.0 |
| Total votes | | 3,854 | 100.0 |

2014 Leyden Township Republican Committeeman election
| Party | Candidate | Votes | % |
|---|---|---|---|
| Republican | Bradley A. Stephens (incumbent) | 3,299 | 100.0 |
| Total votes | | 3,299 | 100.0 |

2018 Leyden Township Republican Committeeperson election
| Party | Candidate | Votes | % |
|---|---|---|---|
| Republican | Bradley A. Stephens (incumbent) | 2,963 | 100.0 |
| Total votes | | 2,963 | 100.0 |

=== Illinois House of Representatives ===
2020

Illinois 20th Representative District Republican Primary, 2020
| Party | Candidate | Votes | % |
|---|---|---|---|
| Republican | Brad Stephens (incumbent) | 3,705 | 100.0 |
| Total votes | | 3,705 | 100.0 |

Illinois 20th Representative District General Election, 2020
| Party | Candidate | Votes | % |
|---|---|---|---|
| Republican | Brad Stephens (incumbent) | 28,314 | 54.60 |
| Democratic | Michelle Darbro | 23,546 | 45.40 |
| Total votes | | 51,860 | 100.0 |

2022

Illinois 20th Representative District Republican Primary, 2022
| Party | Candidate | Votes | % |
|---|---|---|---|
| Republican | Brad Stephens (incumbent) | 5,300 | 100.0 |
| Total votes | | 5,300 | 100.0 |

Illinois 20th Representative District General Election, 2022
| Party | Candidate | Votes | % |
|---|---|---|---|
| Republican | Brad Stephens (incumbent) | 24,146 | 100.0 |
| Total votes | | 24,146 | 100.0 |

2024

Illinois 20th Representative District Republican Primary, 2024
| Party | Candidate | Votes | % |
|---|---|---|---|
| Republican | Brad Stephens (incumbent) | 4,495 | 100.0 |
| Total votes | | 4,495 | 100.0 |

Illinois 20th Representative District General Election, 2024
| Party | Candidate | Votes | % |
|---|---|---|---|
| Republican | Brad Stephens (incumbent) | 35,012 | 100.0 |
| Total votes | | 35,012 | 100.0 |
