= Al-Madinah Cultural Center =

Islamic organization based in Minnesota, the United States

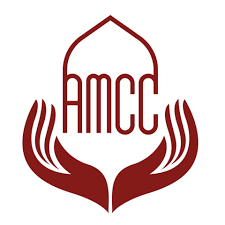
Al-Madinah Cultural Center

Al-Madinah Cultural Center (AMCC, or Al-Madinah) is a non-profit student organization at the University of Minnesota that aims to create a better understanding and appreciation for the diverse culture of Islam through educational, social, and community activities at the University of Minnesota and to groom future leaders from its campus community. Al-Madinah Cultural Center is located in Coffman Memorial Union on the East Bank of the Twin Cities campus.

== History ==
Al-Madinah was officially established in June 1999 as a cultural organization to recognize the need for a gathering place for students with a common Islamic background. With the re-opening of Coffman Memorial Union in January 2003, Al-Madinah was given a space for its cultural center that aims to establish itself as a primary resource on Islam and the Islamic culture or way of life on campus. It was created to provide an environment for different people from different cultures.

== Structure ==
The executive board of Al-Madinah Cultural Center is responsible for managing day-to-day affairs of the organization. Currently, the executive board has the following ten members: President, Vice President, Secretary, Treasurer, Events Coordinator, Outreach Coordinator, Volunteer Coordinator, Historian, Webmaster, and Public Relations. In addition, the executive board also appoints officers and committees for other specialized tasks.

== Activities ==
Al-Madinah Cultural Center raises awareness of Islamic culture through organizing various events such as Islam Awareness Week, Fast-A-Thon, as well as other lectures, seminars, and workshops. It also collaborates with the Muslim Students' Association and various other on campus cultural organizations to host Ramadan iftaars and Eid celebration events.

== Student Services Fees ==
Al-Madinah Cultural Center is one of the organizations that receive part of the Student Services Fees paid by all students. The Student Services Fees Committee recommended an amount of $48,267 for the academic year 2006-2007.

== See also ==
- University of Minnesota
- Muslim Students' Association
- Islamic culture
