= Donald Stephens =

American politician (1928–2007)

Donald E. Stephens

1st Village President of Rosemont, Illinois
- In office 1956 – April 18, 2007
- Preceded by: position established
- Succeeded by: Bradley Stephens

Personal details
- Born: March 13, 1928 Chicago, Illinois, United States
- Died: April 18, 2007 (aged 79) Rosemont, Illinois, United States
- Party: Republican

Donald Edwin Stephens (March 13, 1928 – April 18, 2007) was the first village president (mayor) of Rosemont, Illinois, US. He was also a leading Illinois Republican politician.

== Biography ==
Stephens, born in Chicago, is believed to have been the longest-serving mayor in the United States at the time of his death. He was in the middle of serving his thirteenth consecutive four-year term as mayor of the suburban Cook County village; he almost exceeded the Illinois record for longest-serving mayor, set by Frank Caliper of Colp. Stephens had served as Rosemont’s mayor since the town’s incorporation in 1956. Prior to that, he had been the president of the homeowner's association of the neighborhood that later became known as Rosemont. During his tenure, Rosemont grew from a tiny community of only 85 to one of Illinois' most politically important communities, with over 4,000 residents as well as the nation's tenth-largest convention center. Stephens also oversaw the construction of the 18,500-seat Allstate Arena (formerly the Rosemont Horizon) and the Rosemont Theatre. Stephens was also an avid collector of Hummel figurines and established a museum holding his collection in Rosemont. The Donald E. Stephens Museum of Hummels claims to be the largest public display of Hummel figurines in the world.

Stephens died in Rosemont on April 18, 2007, of complications of stomach cancer. His son Bradley Stephens succeeded him as mayor.

=== Controversy ===
Stephens' political career was dogged by accusations of association with organized crime, which led to the only major political defeat in his career: the revocation of a state-issued casino license for Rosemont. In 1983, Stephens was indicted, in separate prosecutions, for tax fraud and bribery, but was acquitted on both charges. Federal authorities investigated him multiple times throughout his career.
