= IVT Off-Highway Vehicle Technology Expo and Conference =

- iVT Expo logo
- Date: August 25 & 26, 2027 (iVT Expo, Chicago, US); June 9 & 10, 2027 (iVT Expo, Köln Messe, Germany)
- Time: (GMT-5 (Chicago, US), UTC+2 (Köln Messe, Germany))
- Venue: Hall F, Donald E. Stephens Convention Center, Chicago, USA; Hall 1, Köln Messe, Germany
- Location: Chicago, US and Köln Messe, Germany
- Also known as: iVT Expo
- Type: Exhibition and conference
- Organised by: UKI media events
- Participants: 2000+ industry professionals and field experts
- Website: ivtexpo-usa.com; ivtexpo.com

iVT Off-Highway Vehicle Technology Expo and Conference is an international auto exhibition and conference event held annually at US and Europe.

== Event(s) ==
iVT Expo 2026
iVT Expo, Chicago, US	August 25 & 26, 2027
iVT Expo, Köln Messe, Germany	June 9 & 10, 2027
