= Conversion to Islam in U.S. prisons =

The contemporary rate of conversion to Islam is high in American prisons, for which there are a number of factors. It is the fastest growing religion in U.S. prisons, where the population is 18 percent Muslim in federal prisons and 9 percent Muslim in state prisons, compared to 1 percent for the general population. 80 percent of all prison religious conversions are to Islam.

== History ==
=== Early ===
Black Nationalist Muslim organizations, such as The Nation of Islam and Moorish Science Temple of America, formally began prison outreach efforts in 1942. However evidence suggests that Muslims may have comprised a small fraction of the inmate population in the United States as early as the 1910s. New research brought to light an African immigrant inmate at San Quentin State Prison named Lucius Lehman, who was proclaiming himself to be a Muslim religious leader while calling for Black nationalism during his incarceration from 1910–1924. Although there is no documentation that Lehman himself converted to Islam or converted others in prison, it appears that he achieved some level of influence among the prison's Black population during his incarceration. Nation of Islam leader Elijah Muhammad himself was incarcerated in the early 1940s when he was convicted of draft evasion. Elijah Muhammad's organization would later gain its most famous convert, Malcolm X, who took interest in the Black Muslim movement while also incarcerated in the 1950s. A small but steady stream of conversions occurred in the 1950s and early 1960s. In New York, evidence of Sunni Muslims worshiping openly in the state's correctional facilities appeared in the 1960s. These inmates reached out to a local New York Muslim community called Darul Islam for assistance, which eventually led to an active Muslim-based prison ministry and educational program forming in the state. Muslim prison outreach efforts during this era sought to instill values of honesty, hard work, individual responsibility, and mechanisms for dealing with rehabilitation as well as coping with drug and alcohol abuse.

=== Modern ===
The immigrant Muslim population of the United States increased dramatically after the 1960s due the passage of the Immigration and Nationality Act of 1965, which abolished previous immigration quotas. This closely coincided with the transformation of the Nation of Islam into mainstream Sunni Islam ideology under the leadership of Elijah Muhammad's successor and son Warith Deen Mohammed. Immigrant Muslims began getting involved in the work of Muslim prison ministry and rehabilitation, established by their African American Muslims brethren decades before, during the second half of the 20th century in nearly every major American city. Many mosques across the country have some sort of active prison ministry for currently or formerly incarcerated Muslims, with a strong presence from predominantly African American mosques. Some activities include regular prison visits, prison chaplaincy services, counseling to ex-offenders, participation in transitional or halfway homes and substance abuse programs. The vast majority of Muslims in prisons have identified with Sunni Islam or global Islam through the work of these newer prison ministries by the year 2000. Presently, several Muslim-based organizations such as Link Outside and Tayba Foundation have emerged that specifically focus on providing both in-prison and reentry services. Some studies have indicated the rate of recidivism among Muslims is actually lower than any other group.

"Guys are able to utilize the Islamic teachings to deal with some of their personal issues at a higher level, such as post-traumatic stress...emotions or with some of the traumas they have from their childhood."

— Muslim prison instructor and program coordinator with Link Outside

== Prisoner rights and accommodations ==
The Hands-off Doctrine, the approach where federal courts refrained from interfering on inmate rights cases for many decades, was a practice that dated back to the early 20th century and was still practiced by 1960. Despite the growth of conversions to Islam within prisons, states such as California, New York and Texas still had not yet recognized or accommodated the religious activity of Muslim inmates by the start of the 1960s. As the number of incarcerated Muslims began to reach a critical mass, prisoners petitioned courts to advance their religious rights. The Hands-off Doctrine began to diminish during the 1960s as courts started to look into specific violations regarding prisoners. Cases involving Muslim prisoners began succeeding in gaining recognition for a variety of rights over the next several years, such as freedom from punishment due to religion, the right to hold religious services, the right to possess and wear religious medals, and the right to proselytize. New York's State Department of Correctional Services offered to hire Muslim chaplains as department employees by 1975, with the Texas Department of Corrections hiring its first Muslim chaplain two years later.

Muslims later won the legal right to obtain religious (halal) diets in prison, with federal prisons attempting to accommodate halal diets beginning in 1983. Some argue that Islam's growth in prisons was made possible through these court cases. These legal victories not only solidified Islam as a legitimate religion among corrections staff and prisoners, but also placed Muslim groups at the center of the prisoners' rights movement for obtaining constitutional rights on behalf of the incarcerated.

Between October 2017 and January 2019, there were at least 163 lawsuits filed in which Muslim inmates alleged their right to practice Islam had been violated by prisons. A 2019 report by advocacy group Muslim Advocates found that state prisons were inconsistent in providing inmates with accommodations such as halal foods, prayer mats, religious books, religious assembly, and Islamic burial rites. "More and more" states are fully accommodating of Muslim prisoners, but in other states, accommodations are difficult or impossible to obtain. In New Jersey, deceased prisoners have been cremated despite the burial wishes of prisoners – cremation being considered haram (religiously forbidden) in Islam. In 2019, in Alabama, a Muslim prisoner was executed without being allowed to have an imam present with him; his request for a Muslim chaplain to be present was blocked by the prison and denied by the Supreme Court of the United States in a 5-4 decision, because the prisoner had waited too long to file the request. Dissenting judges called the decision "profoundly wrong". Justice Elena Kagan wrote, "The clearest command of the Establishment Clause" is that "one religious denomination cannot be officially preferred over another ... But the State's policy does just that."

== Rate of conversion to Islam ==
Professor Lawrence Mamiya of Religion and Africana Studies argues that Islam's appeal in prison is partially due to the spiritual and theological dimensions of the religion (such as brotherhood along with racial and social justice) as well as the social aspect (such as protection and communal life) it provides the inmate. J. Michael Waller, senior analyst for Strategy at the far-right Center for Security Policy, claims that 80% of the prisoners who find faith while in prison convert to Islam. He also claims that Muslim inmates comprise 17–20% of the prison population in New York, or roughly 350,000 inmates in 2003. Independent studies show similar rates within prisons in the upper Midwest (in urban areas such as Chicago, Detroit, and Cleveland) and on the West Coast (in the San Francisco Bay Area and Los Angeles). These converted inmates are mostly African American, with a growing Hispanic minority. According to a 2003 estimate by FBI, there are 350,000 Muslims in federal, state and local prison, about 30,000 – 40,000 more being converted every year.

"[They are] very quiet, well-disciplined followers of the true Muslim religion."

— Director of the Federal Bureau of Prisons Norman Carlson on Muslim prisoners

Muslim prisoners have been characterized as a danger or threat for radicalization in the media. Yet despite the fact of there being over 350,000 Muslim inmates in the United States, little evidence indicates widespread radicalization or foreign recruitment. Rather, research has shown that Islam has a long history of positive influence on prisoners, including supporting inmate rehabilitation for decades. An early example of this type of characterizations from the media is an article in The New York Times that alleged Imam Warith Deen Umar, Islamic chaplain for the New York State prison system, was reported to have praised the September 11 attacks; prompting members of Congress to call for an investigation. The article states that in a 2004 report, the Justice Department faulted the prison system for failing to protect against "infiltration by religious extremists." However, the report made clear that the problem was not chaplains, but rather unsupervised inmates. In January 2010, the Senate Foreign Relations Committee, chaired by Senator John Kerry, released a report that stated as many as three dozen formerly incarcerated individuals who converted to Islam in American prisons have moved to Yemen where they could pose a "significant threat". However no documentation or verifiable evidence was provided to back up the committee's report (even though the report stated the individuals traveled to apparently learn Arabic)—rather it was simply accepted and invoked as evidence. Another example of such characterization comes from Annenberg Professor of International Communication J. Michael Waller, who asserted that outside Islamist groups linked to terrorism are attempting to radicalize Muslim converts in prison, but other experts suggest that when radicalization does occur, it has little to no connection with these outside interests.

Tens of thousands convert to Islam in US prisons every year.

== Notable converts to Islam in prison ==
- Muhammad Ahmad – civil rights activist, cofounder of the Revolutionary Action Movement
- Jamil Al-Amin – former Student Nonviolent Coordinating Committee leader
- Charles Brooks, Jr. – convicted murderer executed in 1982
- Tray Deee – rapper
- Dave East – rapper
- Jeff Fort – former Chicago gang leader of Black P. Stones
- Kevin Gates – rapper
- Bernard Hopkins – former middleweight and light heavyweight boxing champion
- Demetrius "Hook" Mitchell – basketball player
- Abdul Alim Musa – Muslim-American activist
- Jalil Muntaqim – political activist, former member of Black Panther Party
- Montel Vontavious Porter – professional wrestler signed to the WWE (later became atheist)
- Sanyika Shakur – author, activist, former gang member
- Russell Maroon Shoatz – activist, member of the Black Panther Party and Black Liberation Army
- Mike Tyson – professional boxer
- Marcellus "Khalifah" Williams – controversially executed in 2024 for murder
- Malcolm X – revolutionary and human rights activist
- Flesh-n-Bone – rapper, member of Bone Thugs-n-Harmony
- B.G. Knocc Out – rapper
- Lil Reese – rapper

Terry Holdbrooks is a former prison guard at Guantanamo Bay detention camp who converted to Islam and became an author and public speaker.

== See also ==
- Conversion to Islam and Conversion to Islam in prisons
- Islam in the African diaspora
- Islam in the United States
- Islamic missionary activity
- Jihadist extremism in United States prisons
- Religion in United States prisons
- Freedom of religion in the United States
