= Fast-a-Thon =

Fast-A-Thon is an event held in the month of Ramadan on university campuses in North America to create awareness about the issue of hunger, and also about the Islamic way of life and Muslims. Muslim student organizations, typically the Muslim Students' Association (MSA) get students of all faith to sign up to fast for a day according to Islamic traditions, and for each person that fasts, arrangements are made for a certain amount to be donated to charity on behalf of the person fasting. They usually are also invited to break their fasts with other Muslims at the end of the fasting day.

The University of Tennessee Muslim Student Association held the first Fast-a-Thon in 2001 after the September 11, 2001 attacks and founded a national event that included students at over 230 colleges and universities in 2006. The event also is held to help dispel misconceptions about Islam and Muslims. An event at the University of Michigan has been held annually for over a decade. Other establishments supporting this event are the University of Florida, University of Washington, and the University of Waterloo.

Fast-a-Thon is now an annual event held during Ramadan. If the month of Ramadan falls outside of the universities academic calendar, the MSA may choose another time to hold Fast-A-Thon. The initiative is supported by the global humanitarian organization Action Against Hunger, and has been used annually as part of fundraising efforts for various charities.

== See also ==
- Ramadan in the United States
