= Anime Central =

Annual anime convention in Illinois, US

- Status: Active
- Venue: Hyatt Regency O'Hare; Donald E. Stephens Convention Center
- Location: Rosemont, Illinois
- Coordinates: 41°58′45″N 87°51′35″W
- Country: United States
- Inaugurated: 1998
- Attendance: 32,653 in 2018
- Organizer: Midwest Animation Promotion Society (MAPS)
- Filing status: 501(c)(3)
- Website: www.acen.org

Anime Central (ACen) is an annual three-day anime convention held during May at the Hyatt Regency O'Hare and Donald E. Stephens Convention Center in Rosemont, Illinois. The convention is organized by the Midwest Animation Promotion Society (MAPS).

== Programming ==
The convention typically offers anime viewing rooms, artist alley, autograph sessions, concerts, dances/rave, dealer's room, gaming (arcade, role play, table top, trading card, video) formal ball, karaoke, masquerade, panels, and Q&As. During the convention, the gaming room runs for 24-hour a day.

== History ==
Anime Central was formed in 1998 due to the lack of anime gatherings in the Central United States. During the 2001 convention, construction was occurring at the hotel while the event was underway. Guest Robert DeJesus got married by guest Jan Scott-Frazier, an ordained minister, during the convention. At the 2003 convention, the weekend lines to register for the convention ranged from 90 minutes for pre-registered attendees to 3 hours for others. In 2004 several scheduling problems occurred and opening ceremonies were delayed an hour due to audio-visual problems. The convention experienced problems with its registration system in 2008 resulting in extremely long lines. Two cosplay weddings were held at the convention in 2012, along with the Hyatt needing to be evacuated due to a fire alarm. Anime Central hosted the 2014 US Finals for the World Cosplay Summit.

Anime Central 2020 and 2021 were cancelled due to the COVID-19 pandemic. The convention in 2022 changed its COVID-19 policies shortly before the convention, no longer requiring masks or vaccination. Due to poor feedback from attendees, the policy was later modified requiring masks in several areas.

=== Event history ===
Dates	Location	Atten.	Guests
April 3–5, 1998	Holiday Inn International O'Hare; Rosemont, Illinois	1,203	Juliet Cesario, Robert DeJesus, Jason Gray-Stanford, Fumio Iida, Tsukasa Kotobuki, Trish Ledoux, Steve Pearl, Jan Scott-Frazier, Scott Simpson, Kenichi Sonoda, Amanda Winn-Lee, and Toshifumi Yoshida.
April 23–25, 1999	Ramada Plaza Hotel O'Hare; Rosemont, Illinois	1,640	Leah Applebaum, Robert DeJesus, Crispin Freeman, Tsukasa Kotobuki, Jaxon Lee, Rachael Lillis, Yuji Moriyama, Lisa Ortiz, Steve Pearl, Lorraine Reyes, Jan Scott-Frazier, Doug Smith, Kenichi Sonoda, Shawn the Touched, and Amanda Winn-Lee.
May 12–14, 2000	Sheraton Arlington Park; Arlington Heights, Illinois	2,117	Kara Dennison, Crispin Freeman, Amy Howard-Wilson, Jan Scott-Frazier, and Brett Weaver.
May 11–13, 2001	Sheraton Arlington Park; Arlington Heights, Illinois	3,232	Yoshitoshi Abe, Mika Akitaka, Kia Asamiya, Robert DeJesus, Kara Dennison, Scott McNeil, Range Murata, Jan Scott-Frazier, SWEK, and Brett Weaver.
April 19–21, 2002	Hyatt Regency O'Hare; Rosemont, Illinois	4,520	Ken Akamatsu, Tetsuya Aoki, Steve Bennett, Jessica Calvello, Robert DeJesus, Crispin Freeman, Tiffany Grant, Hilary Haag, Amy Howard-Wilson, Toshihiro Kawamoto, Bruce Lewis, Mary Elizabeth McGlynn, Jan Scott-Frazier, Brad Swaile, SWEK, and J. Torres.
May 16–18, 2003	Hyatt Regency O'Hare; Rosemont, Illinois	6,190	Satoru Akahori, Laura Bailey, Richard Ian Cox, Robert DeJesus, Duel Jewel, Fred Gallagher, Hiroaki Gohda, Tiffany Grant, Takeshi Honda, Yasunori Ide, Yoko Ishida, Kazuyoshi Katayama, Bruce Lewis, Hidenori Matsubara, Maya Okamoto, Chris Patton, Monica Rial, Jan Scott-Frazier, SWEK, Kazuko Tadano, Kōhei Tanaka, and Brett Weaver.
May 14–16, 2004	Hyatt Regency O'Hare; Rosemont, Illinois	7,406	Greg Ayres, Kelli Cousins, Emily DeJesus, Robert DeJesus, Fred Gallagher, Masashi Ishihama, Satoshi Ishino, Taku Iwasaki, Noriyuki Jinguji, Yasuhisa Kato, Hideyuki Kurata, Bruce Lewis, Koji Masunari, Scott McNeil, Vic Mignogna, Yuji Moriyama, Tomonori Ochikoshi, Chris Patton, Monica Rial, Chiwa Saito, SID, SWEK, Taraku Uon, Shinichi Watanabe, and Brett Weaver.
May 13–15, 2005	Hyatt Regency O'Hare; Donald E. Stephens Convention Center; Rosemont, Illinois	10,434	Greg Ayres, Chris Bevins, Beau Billingslea, Steve Blum, Emily DeJesus, Robert DeJesus, Fred Gallagher, Caitlin Glass, Clarine Harp, You Higuri, Hiroaki Inoue, Kumiko Kato, Bruce Lewis, Hiromi Matsushita, Vic Mignogna, Chris Patton, The Penny Lane All Stars, The Pillows, Jan Scott-Frazier, Rikki Simons, Doug Smith, Sally Suzuki, SWEK, Kazuko Tadano, Yusuke Wakamisho, Tavisha Wolfgarth-Simons, and Yutaka Yoshizawa.
May 5–7, 2006	Hyatt Regency O'Hare; Donald E. Stephens Convention Center; Rosemont, Illinois	11,866	Christopher Ayres, Greg Ayres, Troy Baker, Colleen Clinkenbeard, Emily DeJesus, Robert DeJesus, Quinton Flynn, Fred Gallagher, Brittney Karbowski, Bruce Lewis, Mike McFarland, Junko Mizuno, Jeff Nimoy, Chris Patton, Monica Rial, Jan Scott-Frazier, Rikki Simons, Doug Smith, TsuShiMaMiRe, and Tavisha Wolfgarth-Simons.
May 11–13, 2007	Hyatt Regency O'Hare; Donald E. Stephens Convention Center; Rosemont, Illinois	12,769	Christopher Ayres, Greg Ayres, Steve Bennett, Colleen Clinkenbeard, Emily DeJesus, Robert DeJesus, Patrick Drazen, David Fleming, Lisa Furukawa, Tiffany Grant, Matt Greenfield, Mohammad "Hawk" Haque, Kyle Hebert, High and Mighty Color, Noriyuki Jinguji, Brittney Karbowski, Sunao Katabuchi, Hiroshi Koujina, Trish Ledoux, Bruce Lewis, Masao Maruyama, Mike McFarland, Jamie McGonnigal, Yūko Minaguchi, Jeff Moy, Philip Moy, Yasuhiro Nightow, Ananth Panagariya, Chris Patton, PLID, Xero Reynolds, Jan Scott-Frazier, Rikki Simons, Doug Smith, Spike Spencer, Spiral Spiders, Michael "Mookie" Terracciano, Kirk Thornton, Voices For, Kari Wahlgren, Shinichi Watanabe, Brett Weaver, Greg Weisman, Travis Willingham, Tavisha Wolfgarth-Simons, and Toshifumi Yoshida.
May 16–18, 2008	Hyatt Regency O'Hare; Donald E. Stephens Convention Center; Rosemont, Illinois	13,900	Yamila Abraham, Hannah Alcorn, Karan Ashley, DM Ashura, Robert Axelrod, Christopher Ayres, Greg Ayres, Laura Bailey, Steve Cardenas, Emily DeJesus, Robert DeJesus, Aaron Dismuke, Josh Elder, Quinton Flynn, Jason David Frank, Caitlin Glass, August Hahn, Halcali, DJ HeavyGrinder, Mari Iijima, Russell Lissau, Vic Mignogna, Yuji Moriyama, Carli Mosier, Jeff Moy, Philip Moy, Jeff Nimoy, Daniela Orrù, Peelander-Z, Daniela Serri, Shuzilow.HA, Kenichi Sonoda, The Spoony Bards, Hiroshi Tada, Voices For, Travis Willingham, Ono Yoichiro, Mamoru Yokota, and Steve Yun.
May 8–10, 2009	Hyatt Regency O'Hare; Donald E. Stephens Convention Center; Rosemont, Illinois	17,249	Yamila Abraham, J.L. Anderson, Matt Boyd, Colleen Clinkenbeard, Emily DeJesus, Robert DeJesus, Josh Elder, Kerry Freedman, Caitlin Glass, Tiffany Grant, Matt Greenfield, August Hahn, Mark Hildreth, Carl Gustav Horn, Aoi Kidokoro, Bruce Lewis, Russell Lissau, Ian McConville, Vic Mignogna, Misako Rocks!, Move, Fred Perry, Rhea Silvan, The Slants, The Spoony Bards, Chiaki Takahashi, Shinichi Watanabe, and Steve Yun.
May 14–16, 2010	Donald E. Stephens Convention Center; Rosemont, Illinois	19,511	Aural Vampire, Zach Bolton, DJ Chucky, Samurai Dan Coglan, Da/Le, Steve Downes, Josh Elder, Kerry Freedman, Fred Gallagher, Guhroovy, Todd Haberkorn, August Hahn, Steve Horton, DJ Jeffito, Masazumi Kato, Yumiko Kobayashi, Russell Lissau, M-Project, Vic Mignogna, Misako Rocks!, Trevor A. Mueller, Kaori Nazuka, Dominic Nguyen, No+Chin, Brina Palencia, Wendy Powell, DJ Sharpnel, Stephanie Sheh, DJ Shimamura, The Spoony Bards, Narumi Takahira, J. Michael Tatum, Koki Uchiyama, Yoshiki Hayashi, and Steve Yun.
May 20–22, 2011	Hyatt Regency O'Hare; Donald E. Stephens Convention Center; Rosemont, Illinois	23,353	DJ 100mado, Chris Cason, DJ Chucky, Colleen Clinkenbeard, Jillian Coglan, Samurai Dan Coglan, Josh Elder, Flow, Guhroovy, Darrel Guilbeau, August Hahn, Naoto Hirooka, Steve Horton, Koji Ide, DJ Jeffito, Russell Lissau, M-Project, Trevor A. Mueller, No+Chin, Mika Nomura, Raveman, Kosuke Saito, Saki, Stephanie Sheh, Bob Shinohata, Michael Sinterniklaas, Sixh., Hideko Tamura Snider, Spike Spencer, SWEK, J. Michael Tatum, Ugimi Umahara, Cristina Vee, Yoshiki Hayashi, and Steve Yun.
April 27–29, 2012	Hyatt Regency O'Hare; Donald E. Stephens Convention Center; Rosemont, Illinois	24,316	Asuka, John Bivens, Johnny Yong Bosch, Christine Marie Cabanos, Chris Cason, Jillian Coglan, Samurai Dan Coglan, Eyeshine, Gashicon, Todd Haberkorn, Masashi Hamauzu, Steve Horton, Imeruat, Yasuhiro Koshi, Cassandra Lee Morris, Russell Lissau, LM.C, Maki, Jamie Marchi, Eric Maruscak, Joel McDonald, Mike McFarland, Vic Mignogna, Trevor A. Mueller, Brina Palencia, RinRin Doll, Iruma Rioka, Christopher Sabat, Ian Sinclair, Sixh.IBI, Cristina Vee, Video Game Orchestra, Shinichi Watanabe, and Travis Willingham.
May 17–19, 2013	Hyatt Regency O'Hare; Donald E. Stephens Convention Center; Rosemont, Illinois	28,692	Yuu Asakawa, Christopher Ayres, John Bivens, Jillian Coglan, Samurai Dan Coglan, Gashicon, Clarine Harp, Steve Horton, Taliesin Jaffe, Catherine Jones, Kalafina, Fumiko Kawamura, Sarah Lindholm, Russell Lissau, Helen McCarthy, Mint, Trevor A. Mueller, Sonny Strait, Brad Swaile, and Yukino.
May 16–18, 2014	Hyatt Regency O'Hare; Donald E. Stephens Convention Center; Rosemont, Illinois	29,674	Yoshitoshi ABe, Angela, Bryn Apprill, Christopher Ayres, Laura Bailey, Tia Ballard, Josh Elder, Crispin Freeman, Jessie James Grelle, Naoto Hirooka, Emily Neves, Helen McCarthy, Joel McDonald, Trevor A. Mueller, Arnie Roth, Sixh., Nobuo Uematsu, Travis Willingham, and Yutaka Yamamoto.
May 15–17, 2015	Hyatt Regency O'Hare; Donald E. Stephens Convention Center; Rosemont, Illinois	31,113	Bennett Abara, Bryn Apprill, Akitaroh Daichi, Richard Epcar, Sandy Fox, Roland Kelts, Cherami Leigh, Helen McCarthy, Tony Oliver, Ryukishi07, Scandal, Stephanie Sheh, Micah Solusod, Alexis Tipton, Cristina Vee, and Lisle Wilkerson.
May 20–22, 2016	Hyatt Regency O'Hare; Donald E. Stephens Convention Center; Rosemont, Illinois	31,469	Eir Aoi, Takahiro Baba, Jillian Coglan, Samurai Dan Coglan, DJ HeavyGrinder, Erica Lindbeck, Eric Maruscak, Kyle McCarley, Erica Mendez, Mint, Max Mittelman, Na-Ga, Shinji Orito, Monica Rial, and Patrick Seitz.
May 19–21, 2017	Hyatt Regency O'Hare; Donald E. Stephens Convention Center; Rosemont, Illinois	30,221	DJ Amaya, Jillian Coglan, Samurai Dan Coglan, Crispin Freeman, Toru Furuya, Gacharic Spin, DJ HeavyGrinder, Imeruat, Eric Maruscak, May'n, Helen McCarthy, Emily Neves, A New World, Tony Oliver, Putumayo, Micah Solusod, John Swasey, TeddyLoid, Alexis Tipton, Shinichi Watanabe, Lisle Wilkerson, and Mamoru Yokota.
May 18–20, 2018	Hyatt Regency O'Hare; Donald E. Stephens Convention Center; Rosemont, Illinois	32,653	Jillian Coglan, Samurai Dan Coglan, Fhána, Jessie James Grelle, Kyle Hebert, Kikuko Inoue, Mitsuo Iso, Jerry Jewell, Jinsei Kataoka, Kazuma Kondou, Lauren Landa, Cherami Leigh, Eric Maruscak, Erica Mendez, Vic Mignogna, A New World, Takeshi Nogami, Tony Oliver, Brina Palencia, Bryce Papenbrook, Rosuuri, Shuzilow.HA, Micah Solusod, Kenichi Sonoda, J. Michael Tatum, VOfan, Mamoru Yokota, Takahiro Yoshimatsu, and Marco d'Ambrosio.
May 17–19, 2019	Hyatt Regency O'Hare; Donald E. Stephens Convention Center; Rosemont, Illinois	33,084	Takao Abo, Asaka, Jillian Coglan, Samurai Dan Coglan, Justin Cook, Marco d'Ambrosio, Ryoma Ebata, Brett Finnell, Sandy Fox, Crispin Freeman, Tomohiro Furukawa, Caitlin Glass, Darius Hambleton, Hiromitsu Iijima, Jerry Jewell, Brittney Karbowski, Takushi Koide, Masayuki Kojima, Lex Lang, Eric Maruscak, Helen McCarthy, Mai Nakahara, Atsushi Nakayama, Muneki Ogasawara, Miho Okasaki, Tony Oliver, Openworld, Kevin Penkin, Eric Price, Hiroyuki Saita, Sayaka Sasaki, Stephanie Sheh, Shuzilow.HA, W.T. Snacks, Kenichi Sonoda, Aya Suzaki, Natsumi Takamori, Kaiji Tang, Shiori Tani, Jason Thompson, True, Eric Vale, Christopher Wehkamp, and Zaq.
May 20–22, 2022	Hyatt Regency O'Hare; Donald E. Stephens Convention Center; Rosemont, Illinois		Hakos Baelz, Luci Christian, Lucien Dodge, Ricco Fajardo, Dorah Fine, Sandy Fox, Caitlin Glass, Gawr Gura, DJ Hype Girl, James Landino, Lex Lang, Brandon McInnis, Erica Mendez, A New World, Tony Oliver, W.T. Snacks, J. Michael Tatum, and TeddyLoid.
May 19–21, 2023	Hyatt Regency O'Hare; Donald E. Stephens Convention Center; Rosemont, Illinois		Takahiko Abiru, Kyoji Asano, Griffin Burns, Vincent Caso, Robbie Daymond, Ricco Fajardo, Dorah Fine, DJ GreenFlöw, Yurika Kubo, Aleks Le, Eric Maruscak, Faye Mata, Helen McCarthy, Max Mittelman, Tony Oliver, Ram Rider, Revolution Boi, Jonah Scott, John Swasey, Rie Tanaka, Kana Ichinose, Kyary Pamyu Pamyu, Lia, and Azusa Tadokoro.
May 17–19, 2024	Hyatt Regency O'Hare; Donald E. Stephens Convention Center; Rosemont, Illinois		Jillian Coglan, Samurai Dan Coglan, Dorah Fine, Sandy Fox, Hiromi Hirata, Takushi Koide, Lex Lang, Mela Lee, Emi Lo, Lotus Juice, Eric Maruscak, Faye Mata, Adam McArthur, Kayleigh McKee, Cassandra Lee Morris, Win Morisaki, Muneki Ogasawara, Tony Oliver, Raj Ramayya, Revolution Boi, Matthew David Rudd, Tomo Sakurai, Andre "DJ Jinrei" Smith, Kaiji Tang, Sora Tokui, Anne Yatco, Sally Amaki, Karen Imagawa, Takehiro Kubota, Hirotaka Mori, Mayako Nigo, and Tomotaka Shibayama.
May 16–18, 2025	Hyatt Regency O'Hare; Donald E. Stephens Convention Center; Rosemont, Illinois		Satomi Arai, Keith Baker, Bryson Baugus, A.J. Beckles, Kamen Casey, Creep-P, Robbie Daymond, Ben Diskin, Ricco Fajardo, Damien Haas, Justine Huxley, DJ Kagamine, Asami Imai, Honoka Inoue, Hiroyasu Kobayashi, Mela Lee, Eric Maruscak, Faye Mata, Mark Meer, Max Mittelman, Eriko Nakamura, Sarah Natochenny, Tony Oliver, DJ OpM, Oriana Perón, Anairis Quiñones, Zeno Robinson, Nicolas Roye, Keith Silverstein, Andre "DJ Jinrei" Smith, W.T. Snacks, Kirk Thornton, Abby Trott, Kari Wahlgren, and Johnny Young.
May 15–17, 2026	Hyatt Regency O'Hare; Donald E. Stephens Convention Center; Rosemont, Illinois		Morgan Berry, JB Blanc, Griffin Burns, Bill Butts, Clifford Chapin, Jillian Coglan, Samurai Dan Coglan, Jordan Dash Cruz, Richard Epcar, Ricco Fajardo, Sandy Fox, Ayaka Fukuhara, Shawn Gann, Caitlin Glass, Damien Haas, Chris Hackney, Yumi Hara, Akiko Hasegawa, Yuichiro Hayashi, Hyūganatsu, Asami Imai, Yuki Kajiura, Christina Marie Kelly, Takushi Koide, Lex Lang, Mela Lee, Emi Lo, Eric Maruscak, Faye Mata, Kristen McGuire, Brandon McInnis, Jason Charles Miller, Cassandra Lee Morris, Ayaka Ohashi, Tony Oliver, Oriana Perón David Sobolov Jason Spisak, Ellyn Stern, Kaiji Tang, J. Michael Tatum, Minami Tsuda, Corey Wilder, BANVOX, FictionJunction, Hidefumi Kenmochi, kors k, Taku Takahashi, Yu Kousaka, U3 (Yuumi), Andre "DJ Jinrei" Smith, DJ Kagamine, DJ Khek, DJ Wazzy, GreenFlöw, Liquid86, VJ Daguru, Heroic.vers, W.T. Snacks, and Soichi Terada.

== Anime Central Aftershock! ==
Anime Central Aftershock! was a programming track offered at the Chicago Comic-Con on August 6–9, 2009. Programming included anime showings, artist appearances, contests, cosplay, and panel events.

== Otaquest Connect ==
Anime Central partnered with Otaquest to hold an online anime convention on August 15–16, 2020.
