= Rosemont Voters' League =

Rosemont Voter's League
- Abbreviation: RVL
- Chair: David D. Houston
- Founded: 1975; 51 years ago
- Ideology: Machine politics
- Rosemont Village Board: 6 / 6
- Illinois House of Representatives: 1 / 118

The Rosemont Voter's League is a political party within the Village of Rosemont, Illinois. It is de facto affiliated with the Republican Party of Illinois, through its de facto leader Bradley A. Stephens.
