= Warith Deen Umar =

American imam

Warith Deen Umar (born Wallace Gene Marks, 1945) is a New York-area imam and resident of Bethlehem, New York. He was formerly the head Muslim chaplain of the New York State Department of Correctional Services. He retired in August 2000, but continued to visit prisons as volunteer chaplain until The Wall Street Journal reported that he had praised the September 11 hijackers. New York Governor George Pataki banned Umar from visiting state prisons.

== Biography ==
Umar was born the seventh child of a Black Muslim minister, and named in honor of Wallace Delaney Fard.

In 1971, Umar was convicted on weapons charges as part of the Harlem Five and sentenced to two years in prison. Before beginning his sentence, he met Louis Farrakhan and once he began serving his sentence, Umar became a Nation of Islam leader, changing his name to Wallace 10X. After prison he returned to school, bachelor's degree in Criminal Justice and a Masters of Arts in Islamic Studies. In 1975, on parole, he became one of New York's first Muslim prison chaplains.

Umar drew public attention in 2009 when he gave a speech at the annual convention of the Islamic Society of North America in which he asserted that the Holocaust happened to the Jews "because they were serially disobedient to Allah." He went on to allege that a group of Jews close to President Barack Obama "control the world." The ISNA immediately condemned the tenor of the comments.

At one time Umar was employed as the Administrative Chaplain for the State of New York Department of Corrections. A "Radical Muslim," Umar was found to have denied prisoners access to "mainstream" imams and religious instructional and devotional materials. Instead, he was found to have attempted to incite prisoners against America, preaching that the 9/11 hijackers should be remembered as martyrs and heroes. Umar was consequently banned from ever entering a New York State prison.
