= Rosemont, Illinois =

- Village
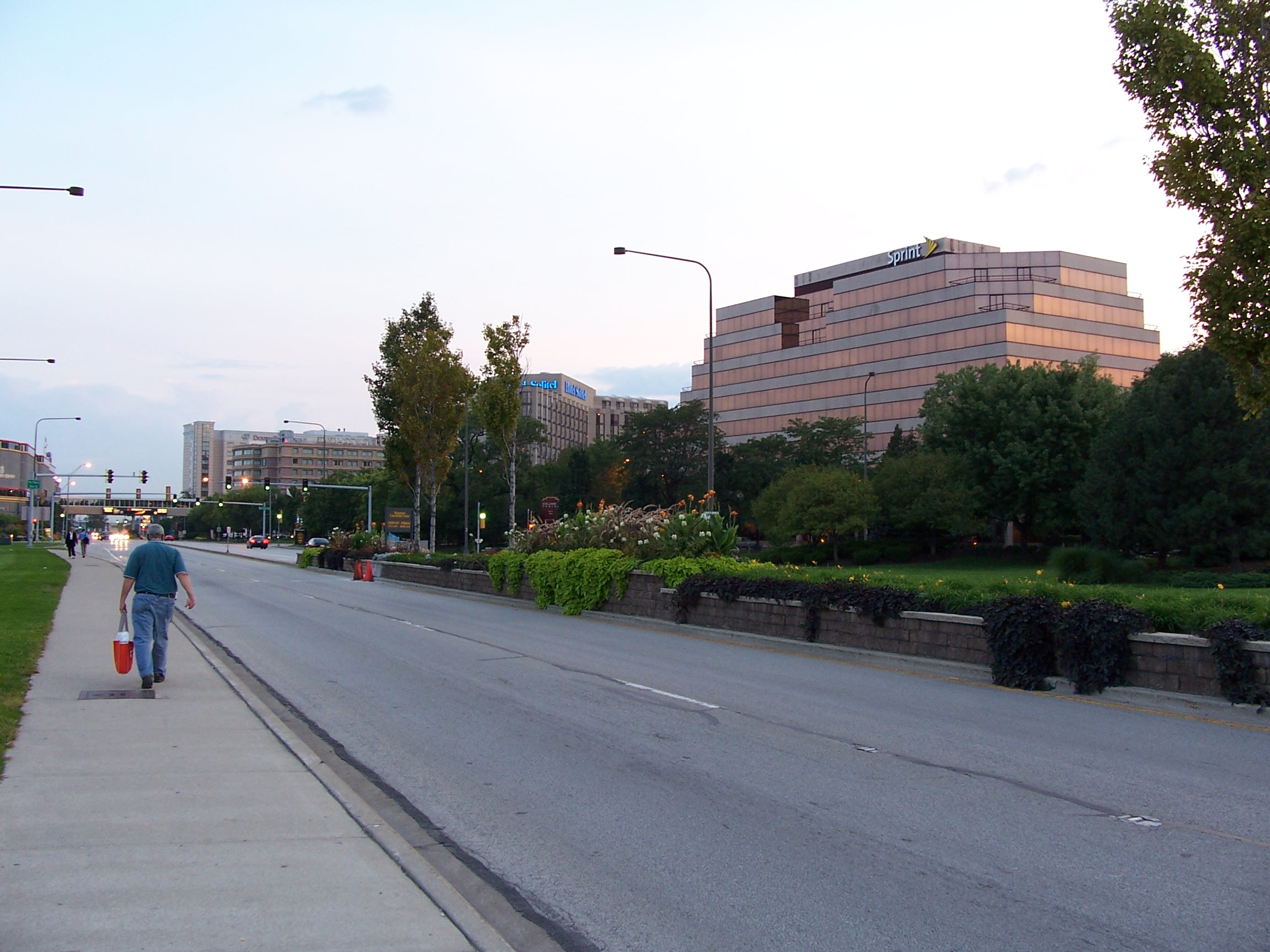
- River Road in Rosemont

- Flag Seal
- Motto: "It's All Here"
- Location of Rosemont in Cook County, Illinois

- Location within Greater Chicago Location within Illinois Location within the United States
- Coordinates: 41°59′27″N 87°52′26″W
- Country: United States
- State: Illinois
- County: Cook
- Township: Leyden
- Founded: 1956
- Founder: Donald Stephens

Government
  - Type: Village
  - Mayor: Bradley Stephens (RVL)

Area
  - Total: 1.79 sq mi (4.64 km^{2})
  - Land: 1.79 sq mi (4.64 km^{2})
  - Water: 0 sq mi (0.00 km^{2})

Population (2020)
  - Total: 3,952
  - Density: 2,204.8/sq mi (851.26/km^{2})
- Time zone: UTC-6 (CST)
  - Summer (DST): UTC-5 (CDT)
- ZIP Code(s): 60018, 60176
- Area code(s): 847, 224
- FIPS code: 17-65819
- Website: rosemont.com

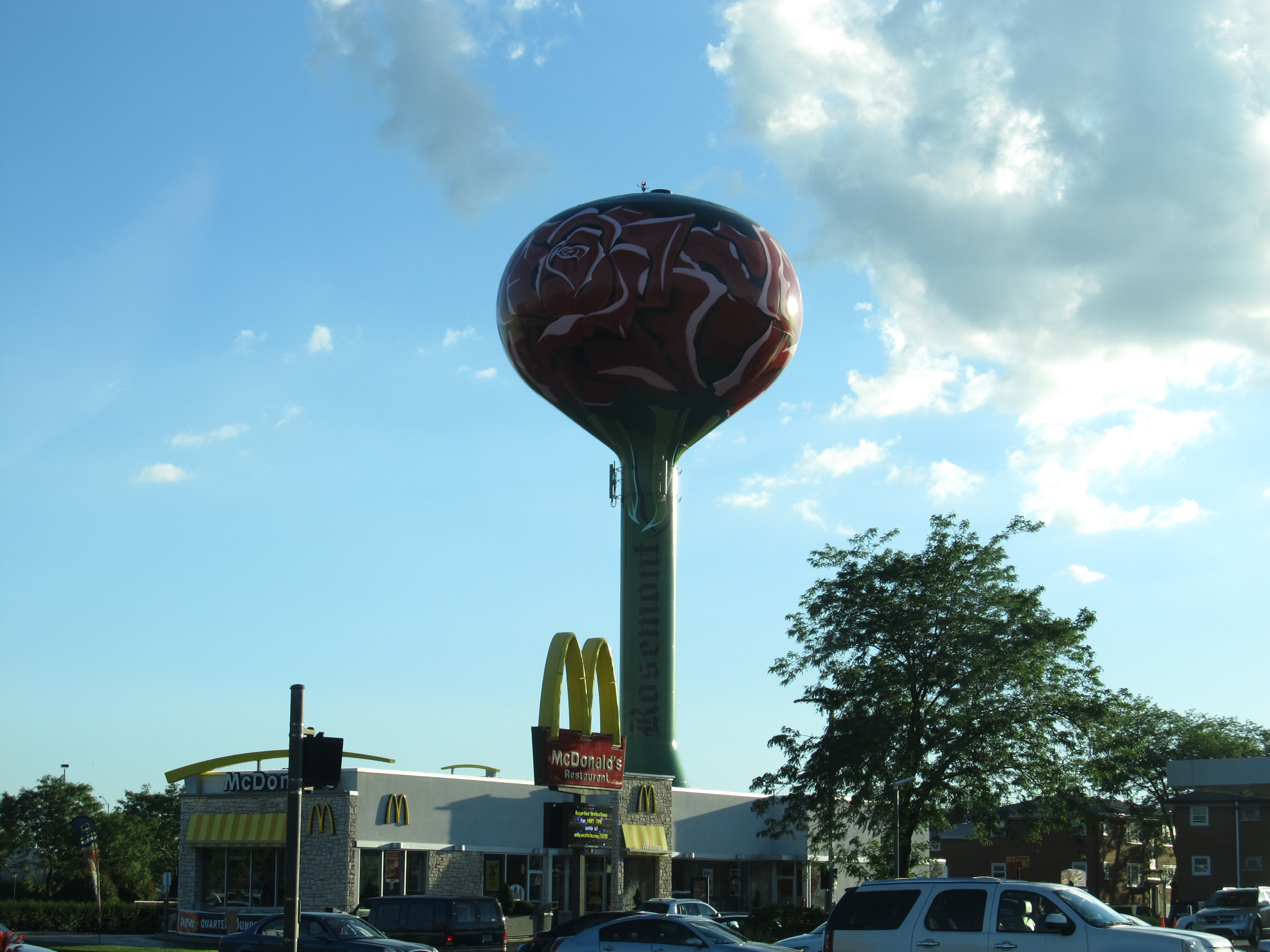
Rosemont's water tower

Rosemont is a village in Cook County, Illinois, United States, located immediately northwest of Chicago. As of the 2020 census, the village had a population of 3,952. The village was incorporated in 1956, though it had been settled long before that. While Rosemont's land area and population are relatively small among municipalities in the Chicago metropolitan area, the village is a major center for commercial activity in the region and is a key component of the Golden Corridor. It contains Allstate Arena, which hosts the Chicago Wolves AHL hockey team. The AUSL Chicago Bandits are also located in Rosemont. Since its founding, the village has been governed by one family, and has been described as America's "last true political machine".

== Geography ==
Rosemont is at 41°59′27″N 87°52′26″W (41.990730, −87.873816). It is part of Leyden Township, Cook County, Illinois.

According to the 2010 census, Rosemont has a total area of 1.79 square miles (4.64 km^{2}), all land.

== Demographics ==
Historical population
Census	Pop.	Note	%±
1960	978		—
1970	4,825		393.4%
1980	4,137		−14.3%
1990	3,995		−3.4%
2000	4,224		5.7%
2010	4,202		−0.5%
2020	3,952		−5.9%
U.S. Decennial Census

=== Racial and ethnic composition ===
Rosemont, Illinois – Racial and ethnic composition Note: the US Census treats Hispanic/Latino as an ethnic category. This table excludes Latinos from the racial categories and assigns them to a separate category. Hispanics/Latinos may be of any race.
Race / ethnicity (NH = Non-Hispanic)	Pop 2000	Pop 2010	Pop 2020	% 2000	% 2010	% 2020
White alone (NH)	2,445	2,199	1,994	57.88%	52.33%	50.46%
Black or African American alone (NH)	50	60	101	1.18%	1.43%	2.56%
Native American or Alaska Native alone (NH)	1	11	0	0.02%	0.26%	0.00%
Asian alone (NH)	186	137	196	4.40%	3.26%	4.96%
Pacific Islander alone (NH)	1	0	0	0.02%	0.00%	0.00%
Other race alone (NH)	1	4	8	0.02%	0.10%	0.20%
Mixed race or Multiracial (NH)	47	57	92	1.11%	1.36%	2.33%
Hispanic or Latino (any race)	1,493	1,734	1,561	35.35%	41.27%	39.50%
Total	4,224	4,202	3,952	100.00%	100.00%	100.00%

=== 2020 census ===
As of the 2020 census, Rosemont had a population of 3,952. The median age was 38.4 years. 20.6% of residents were under the age of 18 and 16.2% were 65 years of age or older. For every 100 females there were 104.9 males, and for every 100 females age 18 and over there were 102.0 males.

100.0% of residents lived in urban areas, while 0.0% lived in rural areas.

There were 1,727 households in Rosemont, of which 29.1% had children under the age of 18 living in them. Of all households, 37.3% were married-couple households, 27.7% were households with a male householder and no spouse or partner present, and 27.9% were households with a female householder and no spouse or partner present. About 37.4% of all households were made up of individuals and 17.3% had someone living alone who was 65 years of age or older.

There were 1,810 housing units, of which 4.6% were vacant. The homeowner vacancy rate was 1.6% and the rental vacancy rate was 4.6%.

=== Demographic estimates ===
According to Census Bureau profile data, there were 1,016 families residing in the village. The population density was 2,205.36 inhabitants per square mile (851.49/km^{2}).

The average household size was 3.38 and the average family size was 2.61.

=== Income and poverty ===
The median income for a household in the village was $56,432, and the median income for a family was $70,909. Males had a median income of $36,504 versus $27,750 for females. The per capita income for the village was $28,034. About 11.6% of families and 10.8% of the population were below the poverty line, including 6.3% of those under age 18 and 15.5% of those age 65 or over.

== Economy ==
Rosemont is positioned directly east of O'Hare International Airport and directly northwest of the City of Chicago. Due to its location, much of the village is occupied by a large highway interchange, hotels, and office buildings. Several major hotel chains operating in the United States have a presence in Rosemont. According to Colliers International, the Rosemont/O'Hare office market encompassed approximately 13.325 million square feet (1,237,900 m^{2}) of total inventory in Q1 2017. Corporate headquarters in the village include those of Culligan, US Foods, Velsicol Chemical Corporation, World Kitchen, Riddell, Reyes Holdings, the Big Ten Conference, and Haribo of America.

Additionally, Rosemont operates several visitor-related forums. Among these are the Donald E. Stephens Convention Center, used for trade shows and gatherings; the Rosemont Theater, used for award ceremonies and concerts; and the Allstate Arena, used for concerts, professional wrestling (three times hosting WrestleMania), Chicago Wolves hockey, and formerly the DePaul Blue Demons basketball program and Chicago Sky WNBA basketball. The village is the sponsor of the Cavaliers Drum and Bugle Corps. The village hosts Midwest FurFest, Exxxotica Expo, G-Fest and Anime Central annually, among other conventions.

== Education ==
Rosemont Elementary School District 78 operates Rosemont Elementary School. Other area schools include Orchard Place School in Des Plaines, operated by the Des Plaines School District 62; East Leyden High School in Franklin Park, operated by the Leyden High School District 212; and Maine West High School in Des Plaines, operated by Maine Township High School District 207. The area that serves District 78 is in the high school district served by East Leyden High School, and the area served by District 62 is served by Maine West High School.

Rosemont is served by two community college districts, Triton College and Oakton College.

== Sports ==
Rosemont's Allstate Arena is home to the Chicago Wolves of the American Hockey League, and has previously been home to the WNBA's Chicago Sky, and the DePaul University basketball team. Starting in 2011, the Chicago Bandits, now of the AUSL, moved to Rosemont after playing in Elgin and Lisle in the past.

The Allstate Arena was home to the Chicago Bruisers, an original member of the Arena Football League in 1987. When the Bruisers advanced to the league championship in 1988, Rosemont hosted ArenaBowl II, as well as an arena football test game in 1987. Rosemont is home to The Cavaliers Drum and Bugle Corps. In March 2013, Rosemont was named a possible location for a replacement of Wrigley Field.

Since October 2013, the Big Ten Conference's headquarters have been in the Rosemont Financial District.

Rosemont is home to the Chicago Dogs, an independent league baseball team. The team is part of the American Association of Independent Professional Baseball and play in a 6,300-seat ballpark, Impact Field. The club played their first games in May 2018.

== Transportation ==
Rosemont has a station on the North Central Service, which provides weekday rail service between Antioch and Chicago Union Station.

Rosemont has a station on the Blue Line of the Chicago "L", which provides direct rail service to O'Hare International Airport, downtown Chicago, and Forest Park.

Pace operates numerous bus routes from a hub at the Rosemont 'L' station. This includes the Pace I-90 Express to Schaumburg and Elgin.

In the 1990s, there were efforts to construct a personal rapid transit system in the village. Rosemont was one of six communities that competed to receive a prototype system, which Regional Transit Authority was planning to build. Rosemont's proposal was selected for the project, but the project was ultimately cancelled in 1999.

== Politics ==
Since the village of Rosemont was incorporated in 1956, one family, the Stephens family, has governed it. Donald Stephens was mayor from 1956 until his death in 2007; his son, Brad Stephens, succeeded him and is the current mayor. In 2017, village trustees voted to increase Stephens's salary by 53 percent to $260,000, making him one of the highest paid mayors in the United States.

The Chicago Tribune has reported that the village was "renowned for insider dealing", acting as a legal mechanism to funnel money to the Stephens family. Throughout the 2000s, at least four other members of the Stephens family held highly paid managerial positions in city institutions such as the convention center, parks, and public safety. The mayor's nephew, Christopher Stephens, runs the village-run convention center and made $255,600 per year between 2015 and 2018. Mark Stephens, the mayor's brother, owns a private company called Bomark which holds a $4.5 million annual contract to handle parking and other public functions. The mayor's sister and other associates have also received public contracts. In a 2023 article, The Economist described the village as "the last true political machine in America" and likened it to autocratic states like Gabon. The family maintain their own political party, the Rosemont Voters League. Brad Stephens has not faced an opponent in mayoral elections since 2009 (when he won 91% of the vote), receiving 100% of the votes cast in 2013, 2017, 2021, and 2025.

=== Investigations ===
Donald Stephens was accused of fraud and bribery twice in the 1980s, but was acquitted. In the late 1990s, the village, Mayor Stephens, and others made efforts to bring a casino, to be called the Emerald Casino, to Rosemont. However, the Illinois Gaming Board eventually withdrew the license in 2001 after concern about close ties to the Chicago Outfit mafia. An FBI agent testified that Stephens had met with Joey Lombardo and John DiFronzo, among others, to divide up contracts for casino work.

In July 2019, the Chicago Sun-Times reported that the FBI was investigating possible wrongdoing in the city's public safety department, including allegations that members of the department had illegally consumed and distributed illegal narcotic painkillers. The Sun-Times also reported that the FBI were looking at a contract awarded for Monterrey Security Consultants, Inc. (a politically connected security company) to oversee security at public venues (including Allstate Arena, Rosemont Theatre, and the Donald E. Stephens Convention Center).

=== Village presidents ===
The following is a list of the village presidents (mayors) of Rosemont:

Village presidents of Rosemont, Illinois
Name	Tenure	Notes	Cite
Donald Stephens	1956 – April 18, 2007	Died in office	
Bradley Stephens	May 6, 2007 – present	Appointed in May 2007; elected to first full term in 2009	

== See also ==
- Death of Kenneka Jenkins, a young woman who died of hypothermia in a Rosemont hotel freezer
