= Donald E. Stephens Convention Center =

Convention center in Rosemont, Illinois, United States

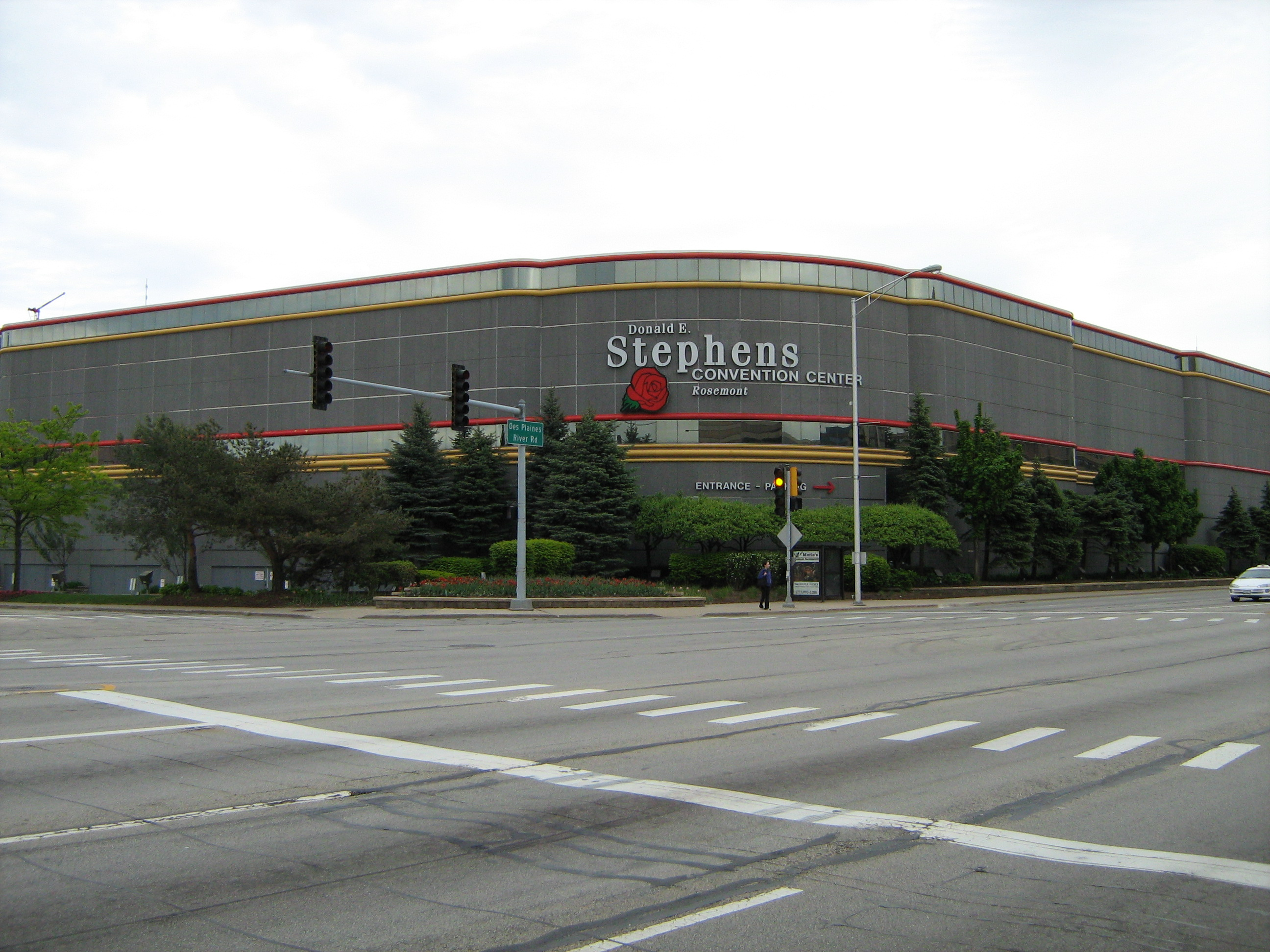
- The center in 2009
- Interactive map of Donald E. Stephens Convention Center
- Former names: Rosemont Convention Center
- Location: 5555 N. River Road; Rosemont, Illinois 60018
- Coordinates: 41°58′45″N 87°51′35″W
- Owner: Village of Rosemont
- Operator: Village of Rosemont
- Public transit: Pace; Blue Rosemont

Construction
- Opened: 1975

The Donald E. Stephens Convention Center, formerly known as the Rosemont/O'Hare Exposition Center, is a convention center located in Rosemont, Illinois, a suburb of Chicago.

Built in 1975, the center has exhibition space of 840,000 sq ft (78,000 m^{2}) and parking available via a Skybridge connected parking garage, which is able to accommodate 8,000 vehicles.

It is located near O'Hare International Airport, Allstate Arena, Rosemont Theatre, and Fashion Outlets of Chicago. The facility is named after the late mayor of Rosemont, Donald E. Stephens.

== Events ==
Notable events held annually include:

- IVT Expo USA
- National Sports Collectors Convention
- Midwest FurFest
- The Chicago RV and Boat Show
- The International Gem and Jewelry Show
- Anime Central
- Anime Midwest
- Anime Magic
- Fan Expo Chicago
- Nightmare Weekend Chicago
- Islamic Society of North America Convention

The American Numismatic Association held their annual "World's Fair of Money" here in 1991, 1999, 2011, 2013, 2014, 2015, 2019, 2021 and 2022.

== See also ==
- List of convention centers in the United States
