= Muslim Students Association =

North American religious organization

Muslim Students' Association
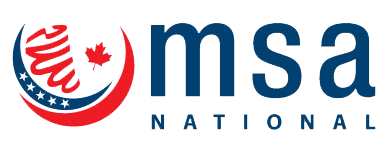
- Abbreviation: MSA National
- Formation: 1963; 63 years ago
- Type: 501(c)(3) organization
- Purpose: To serve millions of Muslim students throughout their college and university years
- Region served: North America
- Affiliations: Islamic Society of North America (ISNA)
- Website: msanational.org

The Muslim Students Association, or Muslim Student Union, of the U.S. and Canada, also known as MSA National, is a religious organization dedicated to establishing and maintaining Islamic societies on college campuses in Canada and the United States. It serves to provide coordination, community, outreach and support for affiliated MSA chapters in colleges across North America. Established in 1963, the organization now has chapters in colleges across the continent, and is the precursor of the Islamic Society of North America and several other Islamic organizations. The Muslim Students Association has at times been the subject of scrutiny; for example, the New York Police Department (NYPD) targeted MSAs across several US college campuses for monitoring as part of their Muslim surveillance program.

== Organization ==
The Muslim Students Association of the U.S. and Canada is also known as MSA National. It is an umbrella organization for all of affiliated chapters at various campuses across the continent. Local chapters are only loosely connected with the parent institution, and often take different names, such as "Islamic Students Association", or "Muslim Discussion Group". Not all campus Muslim groups are necessarily affiliated with MSA National.

There is no fixed hierarchy between MSA National and local chapters; as such, the policies and views of the national organization are not necessarily shared by local chapters. The United States and Canada are divided into five zones, three in the US and two in Canada. Each zone has a zonal representative, chosen by the members of the affiliated chapters within that zone. Chapters make up regional councils.

== History ==
The first MSA National chapters were formed in 1963 at the University of Michigan in Ann Arbor and at the University of Illinois at Urbana–Champaign (UIUC) by international students. The initial leadership primarily came from Arabic-speaking and Urdu-speaking members, with guidance from students of the Egyptian-based Muslim Brotherhood and Pakistan-based Jamaat-e-Islami. A Saudi Arabian charity, the wahhabist Muslim World League, provided early funding for the groups. Early goals for the movement included the promotion of "a self-definition [that] involves initially and fundamentally [an] Islamic identity" of its members, as well as an appropriate Islamic lifestyle while they were in the US.

With time, MSA groups became more interested in seeking how to integrate and institutionalize Islam and Islamic culture into American life. Current issues such as the position of women in Islam and problems in the Islamic countries began to be debated. The groups proved important as mobilizers in developing increasing Muslim political activity in the United States. Student leaders, as these graduated, went on to form the Islamic Society of North America. From the 1960s onwards, the MSA engaged in educational activities, including the translation and publishing of works by major Islamic scholars. In 1966 MSA founded the Islamic Book Service, to distribute magazines and books. In addition, books about Islam were distributed on campuses to both Muslims and non-Muslims. In the 1970s, a fiqh, or legal council was established by MSA; initially the fiqh rendered opinions on minor issues such as the start of Ramadan. By 1988, however, it was making decrees on a broad range of religious and social issues.

In 1994, after nearly 12 years of being virtually defunct, MSA National's leadership held a first-ever strategic planning retreat at the University of Michigan in Ann Arbor, bringing 27 undergraduate and graduate students from around the US and Canada together. This retreat would spark the re-emergence of MSA National as an independent, unique organization with a dedicatedly first and second generation focus. Nearly all of the 27 students were born or raised in the US and Canada, and were of the next generation of North American Muslims, signifying a radical shift in MSA National's future direction. From 1994 onward, MSA National held conferences on college campuses, convention centers and mosques around the US and Canada, with no guidance and direction from any other group or organization.

== Activities ==
Today, the organization is present in various forms on several campuses across the United States and Canada. In contrast to early membership, members are now frequently American-born Muslims. Activities include prayer times, lectures, discussion, and social events, and seek to unify Muslim students from different cultural backgrounds. At a campus level, groups lobby universities for recognition of Islamic holidays and prayer times, the availability and size of prayer rooms and for the provision of religiously permitted food on campus. MSAs engaged in various charitable activities. They raise funds through events known as "Fast-A-Thons", which originated at the University of Tennessee in Knoxville. The MSA launched a "Peace ... not Prejudice" campaign to dispel stereotypes and paint Islam in a positive light.

== Islam Awareness Week ==
Islam Awareness Week was a project started in the early 1990s by the Muslim Students Association of the United States and Canada. Its aim was to introduce Islam on a unified platform to all university and college campuses. During this week, each MSA offers information through a variety of resources and organizes activities in order to promote an understanding of Islamic principles and ideals. Information on Islam is presented in forms of topic tailored tables, free literature, and also through dialogue. Activities may include speeches given by prominent Muslim figures, interactive games, movie showings, or a night of Islamic entertainment and traditional ethnic dinners. Islam Awareness Week seeks to promote a positive understanding of Islam throughout the university community and hopes to build and strengthen connections and relationships within the university community for the promotion and recognition of Muslim North Americans.

== Controversies ==
=== Aafia Siddiqui's possible radicalization at MIT ===
Suspected al-Qaeda member Aafia Siddiqui was active in the MSA at MIT when she attended there in the 1990s and was known for participating in charity for Islamic organizations.

Journalist Deborah Scroggins, in exploring how Siddiqui might have become an Islamist extremist, wrote for Vogue that if Siddiqui "was drawn into terrorism, it may have been through the contacts and friendships she made in the early 1990s working for MIT's Muslim Students Association. Members of the Muslim Brotherhood, the world's oldest and biggest Islamist movement, established the first MSAs in the country... and the movement's ideology continued to influence the MSA long after that. At MIT, several of the MSA's most active members followed the teachings of Abdullah Azzam, a Muslim Brother who was Osama bin Laden's mentor." According to Scroggins article, "[Azzam] had established the Al Kifah Refugee Center to function as its worldwide recruiting post, propaganda office, and fund-raising center for the mujahideen fighting in Afghanistan. ... It would become the nucleus of the al-Qaeda organization."

=== Muslim Student Union at the University of California, Irvine ===
The University of California Irvine Muslim Student Union is an affiliated chapter of MSA National, which was suspended for the 2010–11 school year for disrupting a speech given by Israeli Ambassador Michael Oren at a university sponsored event. The students claimed they were exercising their right to protest and free speech.

=== New York Police Department monitoring of MSAs ===
The NYPD illegally monitored Muslim student associations in the Northeast US, citing a list of 12 people arrested or convicted on terrorism charges in the United States and abroad who had once been members of Muslim student associations. In rationalizing their monitoring activities, the NYPD noted they followed the same rules as the FBI, but several civil rights organizations argued that they engaged in unconstitutional racial and religious profiling and spying without evidence against individuals. The universities involved in the student monitoring included Yale; Columbia; the University of Pennsylvania; Syracuse; New York University; Clarkson University; the Newark and New Brunswick campuses of Rutgers; the State University of New York campuses in Buffalo, Albany, Stony Brook and Potsdam; Queens College; Baruch College; Brooklyn College and La Guardia Community College.

In one monitoring incident, a conference which was to be attended by MSA students included Siraj Wahaj, a prominent but controversial New York imam who has attracted the attention of authorities for years. According to the ACLU, as a result of ongoing spying through undercover police and informants, the covert program introduced distrust of law enforcement and a culture of community fear and stigma.

In June 2012, MSA National, along with other plaintiffs, filed suit against the City of New York, in New Jersey federal court. The suit alleged, on behalf of two New Jersey MSA chapters, that they were deprived of their Free Exercise rights under the First and Fourteenth Amendments, and seeks to force the NYPD to expunge all data, information and conclusions regarding the Plaintiffs compiled by the NYPD.

In April 2018, the NYPD and the plaintiffs finally came to a settlement agreement. Among the terms of the settlement, the NYPD promised to stop and never again engage in surveillance based on religion or ethnicity, the NYPD also agreed to compensate Muslim owned businesses, individuals and Mosques for financial losses caused by the program as well the suffering and indignation caused by it.

=== Racism and Arab/South-Asian bias ===
In the 1970s, the MSA conducted a survey which showed that most "felt like there weren’t enough efforts to include African-American Muslims and African-American students at MSAs across the country have offered their stories of exclusion and marginalization within the organization, saying that efforts to talk about race in the community are often met with resistance or dismissal.

The Black In MSA hashtag (or #BlackInMSA) generated discussion of the stereotypes and racism which African-American students were subject to in the MSA from Arab and South-Asian members. This included reluctance to engage with issues affecting African-American students on campus, reluctance to talk about racism, and hesitation or outright refusal to support African-American students and communities in the Black Lives Matter.

== See also ==
- Islamic Society of North America
