= Eric Holtz =

American baseball manager

Israel National Baseball Team
- Manager
- Born: December 5, 1965 (age 60); White Plains, New York, U.S.
- Bats: Right Throws: Right

Eric Holtz (born December 5, 1965) is an American former manager of the Israel national baseball team. He was the assistant coach of gold-medal-winning Team USA in baseball at the 2013 Maccabiah Games, and the Team USA head coach for the gold-medal-winning Under-18 baseball team at the 2017 Maccabiah Games. He was the head coach of the first baseball team to represent Israel at the Olympics.

== Biography ==
Holtz was born in New York, New York, and raised in the Bronx, New York. He is Jewish, and had his bar mitzvah at the Western Wall. His father fought in World War II.

Holtz founded and is the owner of Game On 13, a baseball and softball strength and sports conditioning and skills development training facility in Elmsford in Westchester County in New York State.

His wife is Traci Holtz, and they have three children.

== Playing career ==
He attended Dean College, where Holtz played baseball for two years. He played third base and pitcher for the Bet Shemesh Blue Sox of the Israel Baseball League as a player-coach in 2007, during which time he roomed with player Nate Fish. He won the Commissioner’s Award for Distinguished Service.

== Coaching career ==
He was an assistant baseball coach at Manhattanville College from 2004 to 2007, and then the hitting coach at Westchester Community College from 2008 to 2015.

Holtz was the assistant coach of gold-medal-winning Team USA in baseball at the 2013 Maccabiah Games. He was then the Team USA head coach for the gold-medal-winning Under-18 baseball team at the 2017 Maccabiah Games.

=== Team Israel ===
He was named the baseball head coach of the Israel national baseball team in 2017. The Israel Association of Baseball named Holtz as the manager for the 2020 Olympic Qualifiers.

The team played in the 2019 European Baseball Championship - B-Pool in early July 2019 in Blagoevgrad, Bulgaria, winning all five of its games and advancing to the playoffs against Team Lithuania in the 2019 Playoff Series at the end of July 2019 for the last qualifying spot for the 2019 European Baseball Championship.

In September 2019, he managed Team Israel to a fourth-place finish at the 2019 European Baseball Championship in Germany. Among the teams Team Israel defeated was Team Germany. Holtz noted: "Going to Germany, a country that we wouldn’t have been allowed in 80 years ago, and not only to go there but perform there and defeat them on their own land, yeah, it was a little bit more (meaningful) once the game was over." He also managed the team at the Africa/Europe 2020 Olympic Qualification tournament in Italy in September 2019, which Israel won to qualify to play baseball at the 2020 Summer Olympics in Tokyo.
