= Blake Gailen =

Israeli-American baseball player (born 1985)

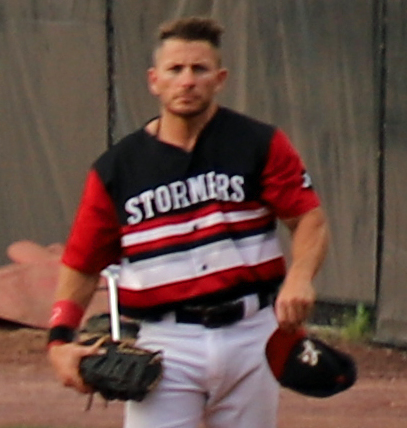
- Gailen with the Lancaster Barnstormers in 2021
- Outfielder / Coach
- Born: March 27, 1985 (age 41); Verdugo Hills, California, U.S.
- Bats: Left Throws: Left
- Stats at Baseball Reference

Blake Shane Gailen (Hebrew: בלייק גיילין; born March 27, 1985) is an American-Israeli hitting coach for the Tulsa Drillers and left-handed former professional baseball outfielder. He played for the Israel National Baseball Team.

In high school, Gailen was first-team All-West Valley League in California in his junior and senior seasons. He played baseball for Glendale Community College, where he was All-Western State Conference as a freshman and All-Southern California Team as a sophomore. He played summer ball, and was a Coastal Plain League All Star during the 2005 and 2006 seasons.

In 2011 Gailen won the American Association batting title with a .406 batting average, a new league record. In 2012, he was named the Atlantic League Most Valuable Player as well as Baseball America's Independent League Player of the Year, and starting All Star in left field, after batting .338 (winning his second consecutive league batting title) with 22 home runs, 89 RBIs, and 25 stolen bases. In 2014, he was named to the Atlantic League's All-Star team.

He played in Double–A for the Toronto Blue Jays organization in 2011 and 2015, and in Triple–A for the Los Angeles Angels organization in 2013. Through 2018, Gailen had played 1,226 games over 12 seasons, and batted .306 with 167 home runs in aggregate. Gailen played for Team Israel at the 2017 World Baseball Classic in 2017, and in the Confederation of European Baseball 2019 European Baseball Championship - B-Pool in 2019, where he was named the MVP. He signed a minor league contract with the Los Angeles Dodgers in 2017. After finishing the season with the Tulsa Drillers, Gailen was brought back for spring training. He did not make the team out of spring training and played the season out with the Lancaster Barnstormers. In 2018, he became a dual Israeli citizen. Gailen again signed a minor league contract with the Los Angeles Dodgers in January 2019. Out of spring training, he was assigned to the Triple-A Oklahoma City Dodgers. He played for Team Israel at the 2019 European Baseball Championship. He also played for the team at the Africa/Europe 2020 Olympic Qualification tournament in Italy in 2019, which Israel won to qualify to play baseball at the 2020 Summer Olympics. In October 2020, Gailen signed a contract with the Melbourne Aces of the Australian Baseball League. He played center field for Team Israel at the 2020 Summer Olympics in Tokyo in the summer of 2021.

== Early life ==
Gailen was born in Verdugo Hills, California, to Scott and Charlene ("Char") Gailen, and grew up in West Hills, California. He has an older sister named Jenni. Gailen is Jewish. He and major league infielder Josh Satin—also a member of the Israeli national baseball team—have been friends since they were children, and Gailen attended Satin's bar mitzvah. Asked about his height, Gailen said: "I like to say, 5-8¾."

He played baseball in high school for El Camino Real High School in Woodland Hills, California, where Gailen pitched (throwing a no-hitter as a senior, and going 19-4 his last two seasons) as well as played outfield and hit, graduating in 2003. He was first-team All-West Valley League in his junior and senior seasons. He went un-drafted after high school.

== College ==
Gailen played baseball in college first for Glendale Community College (graduating in 2005), where he was All-Western State Conference as a freshman and All-Southern California Team as a sophomore. He played summer ball for the Fayetteville SwampDogs during the 2005 and 2006 seasons, both pitching and playing outfield, and was a Coastal Plain League All Star both seasons.

He then played for the University of Nevada-Las Vegas Rebels baseball team, where Gailen was named the Mountain West Conference Player of the Week on February 12, 2007, and graduated with a degree in Communications in 2007. He went un-drafted after college.

== Professional career ==
Gailen was signed in 2011 and 2015 by the Los Angeles Angels. He has also played in the Toronto Blue Jays organization (which signed him in 2013), the Los Angeles Dodgers organization (which signed him in 2017 and 2019), on independent league teams, and in Mexico and Venezuela.

=== Anderson Joes ===
Gailen began his professional career in 2007 with the minor league baseball independent team the Anderson Joes of the South Coast League, batting .368/.455/.526 in 42 games.

=== Wichita Wingnuts ===
On July 28, 2008, playing for the Wichita Wingnuts, he was named the American Association Batter of the Week.

=== Chico Outlaws ===
In 2009, Gailen batted .355 with the Chico Outlaws of the Golden Baseball League, and was the youngest batter in the top 10 in batting in the league. In 2010, he batted .387. (finishing 2nd in the league to Larry Bigbie in batting average)/.480 (3rd in the league)/.603 for Chico, and was a league All Star.

=== Lincoln Saltdogs ===
In 2011, he won the American Association batting title with a league-leading .406 batting average, a new league record, while playing for the Lincoln Saltdogs. He played center field and batted leadoff for the Saltdogs, and also led the league in on-base percentage (.479) and slugging percentage (.622).

=== Los Angeles Angels ===
Gailen was then signed to a minor league contract by the Los Angeles Angels in July 2011, and played for the Double–A Arkansas Travelers of the Texas League, replacing Mike Trout who had just been called up. In 29 games, playing right field primarily, he batted .208.

=== Lancaster Barnstormers ===
In 2012 Gailen was named the Atlantic League Most Valuable Player as well as Baseball America's Independent League Player of the Year, and starting All Star in left field, after batting .338 (winning his second consecutive league batting title, and setting a team record)/.415 (leading the league)/.534 with 22 home runs, 89 RBIs, and 25 stolen bases for the Lancaster Barnstormers.

=== Toronto Blue Jays ===
In August 2013, he was signed to a minor league contract by the Toronto Blue Jays, as Gailen was leading the Atlantic League in doubles and walks while playing in 113 games for the Lancaster Barnstormers. He played in eight games for Toronto’s Triple-A affiliate, the Buffalo Bisons, batting .286. He then played in 46 games for the Venados de Mazatlan in the Mexican Pacific Winter League.

=== Lancaster Barnstormers (second stint) ===
In 2014, playing again for the Lancaster Barnstormers, Gailen was named to the Atlantic League's All-Star team, and for the season batted .350/.460/.646 with 18 homers, 52 RBIs, and a 1.107 OPS. Manager Butch Hobson said: "This guy is one of the best, if not the best, players in the league." He also played 51 games for Toros de Tijuana of the Mexican League, batting .271/.385/.537 with 11 home runs. He then played 22 games for Leones del Caracas of the Venezuelan Winter League, and 19 games for the Venados de Mazatlan in the Mexican Pacific Winter League.

=== Los Angeles Angels (second stint) ===
In 2015, he started the season again playing for the Lancaster Barnstormers, and in June after 44 games was again signed to a minor league contract by the Los Angeles Angels. The Angels assigned him to the Double–A Arkansas Travelers, and that month he was Player of the Month for the Travelers, for whom he played in 76 games during the season.

=== Lancaster Barnstormers (third stint) ===
In 2016, after off-season surgery he played in 48 games for the Lancaster Barnstormers.

In 2017, Gailen began the season back with the Lancaster Barnstormers. In 54 games he batted .323/.408/.521, raising his career records with the Barnstormers to first all-time in home runs (72), runs scored (309), hits (524), and doubles (108), and tied for first in RBIs (273), while tied for second in steals (75 steals).

=== Los Angeles Dodgers ===
Gailen signed a minor league contract with the Los Angeles Dodgers on June 25, 2017, and was assigned to the Double–A Tulsa Drillers in the Texas League. In 49 games for Tulsa, he hit .300/.369/.500. He was released by the organization on March 22, 2018.

=== Lancaster Barnstormers (fourth stint) ===
On March 30, 2018, Gailen re-signed with the Lancaster Barnstormers. In 126 games he batted .282/.378/.511 and led the Atlantic League in home runs (28; one short of the franchise record) and RBIs (91), while coming in second in walks (72). He was named an All Star for the third time. His 99 career home runs in the Atlantic League were 10th-most in league history. He became a free agent following the 2018 season.

On October 31, 2018, Gailen signed with the Tomateros de Culiacán of the Mexican Pacific League.

=== Los Angeles Dodgers (second stint) ===
On January 22, 2019, Gailen signed a minor league contract with the Los Angeles Dodgers. Playing for the Triple-A Oklahoma City Dodgers in 2019, he batted .250/.321/.396 with one home run and six RBI. Gailen elected free agency following the season on November 4.

On January 9, 2020, Gailen re-signed with the Dodgers organization on a minor league contract. He did not play in a game in 2020 due to the cancellation of the minor league season because of the COVID-19 pandemic. Gailen was released by the Dodgers organization on July 1.

=== Melbourne Aces ===
On October 3, 2020, Gailen signed a contract with the Melbourne Aces of the Australian Baseball League for the 2020-21 season.

=== Lancaster Barnstormers (fifth stint) ===
On March 24, 2021, Gailen signed with the Lancaster Barnstormers of the Atlantic League of Professional Baseball for the 2021 season. In 2021 he batted .279/.421/.519 with 18 home runs, 72 RBI, and 68 walks (7th in the league) in 287 at bats for Lancaster. He became a free agent following the season.

== Coaching career ==
On December 23, 2021, Gailen announced that he would be joining the Los Angeles Dodgers organization as a coach in the hitting department and retire as an active player. In 2022, he was the hitting coach for the Arizona League Dodgers.

On February 23, 2024, Gailen was announced as the hitting coach for the Single–A Rancho Cucamonga Quakes. In 2025, Gailen was named as the hitting coach for the Tulsa Drillers, Los Angeles' Double-A affiliate.

== Team Israel ==
Gailen played for Israel at the 2017 World Baseball Classic qualifier. After not playing in the first game, he was a late-inning defensive replacement in the second game, but did not bat. Gailen started the third game in center field, and hit a two-run home run in the 5th inning, while walking twice and scoring an additional run.

Gailen played left field for Team Israel at the 2017 World Baseball Classic main tournament, in March 2017. He said: "it was the best experience of my life, there’s not even a question."

In October 2018 he became a dual Israeli citizen, partly to help Israel’s baseball team make the 2020 Olympics. He played for Team Israel in the Confederation of European Baseball 2019 European Baseball Championship - B-Pool in early July 2019 in Blagoevgrad, Bulgaria, as it won all six of its games and advanced to the playoffs against Team Lithuania in the 2019 Playoff Series at the end of July 2019 for the last qualifying spot for the 2019 European Baseball Championship. He was named the MVP of the tournament, as he batted .571 (2nd in the tournament)/.654 (leading the tournament)/1.048 (2nd).

He played for Team Israel at the 2019 European Baseball Championship, where he batted .355/.412/.742 with 3 home runs and 8 RBIs in 31 at bats in seven games and was tied for second among all Championship batters in doubles (3), fifth in total bases (23), and tied for sixth in hits (11). He also played for the team at the Africa/Europe 2020 Olympic Qualification tournament in Italy in September 2019, which Israel won to qualify to play baseball at the 2020 Summer Olympics in Tokyo. He played center field and batted .286/.375/.333 in the tournament.

Gailen said that as the last game of the tournament ended, with Israel qualifying for the 2020 Olympics: "I don't remember ever crying during a game... But I was super emotional. This is the Olympics. It hit me so hard. And I saw how hard it was hitting the guys around me."

He played center field for Team Israel at the 2020 Summer Olympics in Tokyo in the summer of 2021.

== Awards ==
- 2012 Baseball America Independent League Player of the Year
- Golden Baseball League All-Star (2010)
- Golden Baseball League champion (2010)
- Atlantic League Player of the Year (2012)
- Atlantic League All-Star (2012, 2014, 2018)
- Lancaster Barnstormers All-Time Hits Leader
- Australian Baseball League champion (2021)
