= Tal Erel =

Israeli baseball player (born 1996)

Tal Erel טל אראל

Israel National Baseball Team
- Catcher
- Born: June 16, 1996 (age 29); Ramat Gan, Israel
- Bats: Switch Throws: Right
Medals
Men's baseball
Representing Israel
European Baseball Championship
Silver medal – second place	2021 Israel	Team

Tal Erel (Hebrew: טל אראל; born June 16, 1996) is an Israeli baseball player for the Israel National Baseball Team. He has played college baseball at Lynn University. He played for Team Israel at the 2020 Summer Olympics in Tokyo in 2021.

== Early life ==
Erel was born in Ramat Gan, Israel, to Yaron and Galit Erel, and lived for a time in Miami, Florida (from ages six to ten), and Givatayim, Israel. He has two siblings. He served in the Israel Defense Forces from 2014–17.

== Baseball career ==
=== Europe ===
In 2016 Erel played for the Tempo Titans Prague in the Czech Republic 1st League. In 2017 he played for the UVV Utrecht in the Honkbal Hoofdklasse in the Netherlands.

=== College ===
In 2017–18 he attended Miami Dade College. He then played baseball for the Palm Beach State College Panthers as a switch-hitting catcher, as he studied Business Administration. He graduated in 2019 with an Associate in Arts degree, and was one of two Palm Beach players who won both the Florida College System Activities Association Academic Award and the National Junior College Athletic Association Academic Award.

Starting in September 2019 he was a sophomore at Lynn University, and played baseball for the university's Fighting Knights. He is an investment management major and earned a BA in 2021. When he played for Israel in the 2020 Olympics he became the second student-athlete in the university's history to compete in the Olympics, joining Melissa Ortiz who represented Colombia women's soccer in 2012 and 2016.

=== Team Israel ===
Erel has been a member of the Israel national baseball team since 2011. He served as the bullpen catcher for the Team Israel at the 2017 World Baseball Classic. He appeared in three games as catcher as the team played in the 2019 European Baseball Championship - B-Pool in early July 2019 in Blagoevgrad, Bulgaria, winning all of its games and advancing to the playoffs against Team Lithuania in the 2019 Playoff Series at the end of July 2019 for the last qualifying spot for the 2019 championship. He played for Israel at the 2019 European Baseball Championship, batting 3-for-10.

Erel also played for Israel at the Africa/Europe 2020 Olympic Qualification tournament in Italy in September 2019, which Israel won to qualify to play baseball at the 2020 Summer Olympics in Tokyo. He played for Israel at the 2020 Summer Olympics in Tokyo in the summer of 2021, at catcher and as a pinch hitter.

He played for Israel in the 2021 and 2023 European Championships, starting games in 2021 and coming off the bench in 2023. He was again the team's bullpen catcher for the 2023 World Baseball Classic.
