= Joey Wagman =

American-Israeli baseball pitcher (born 1991)

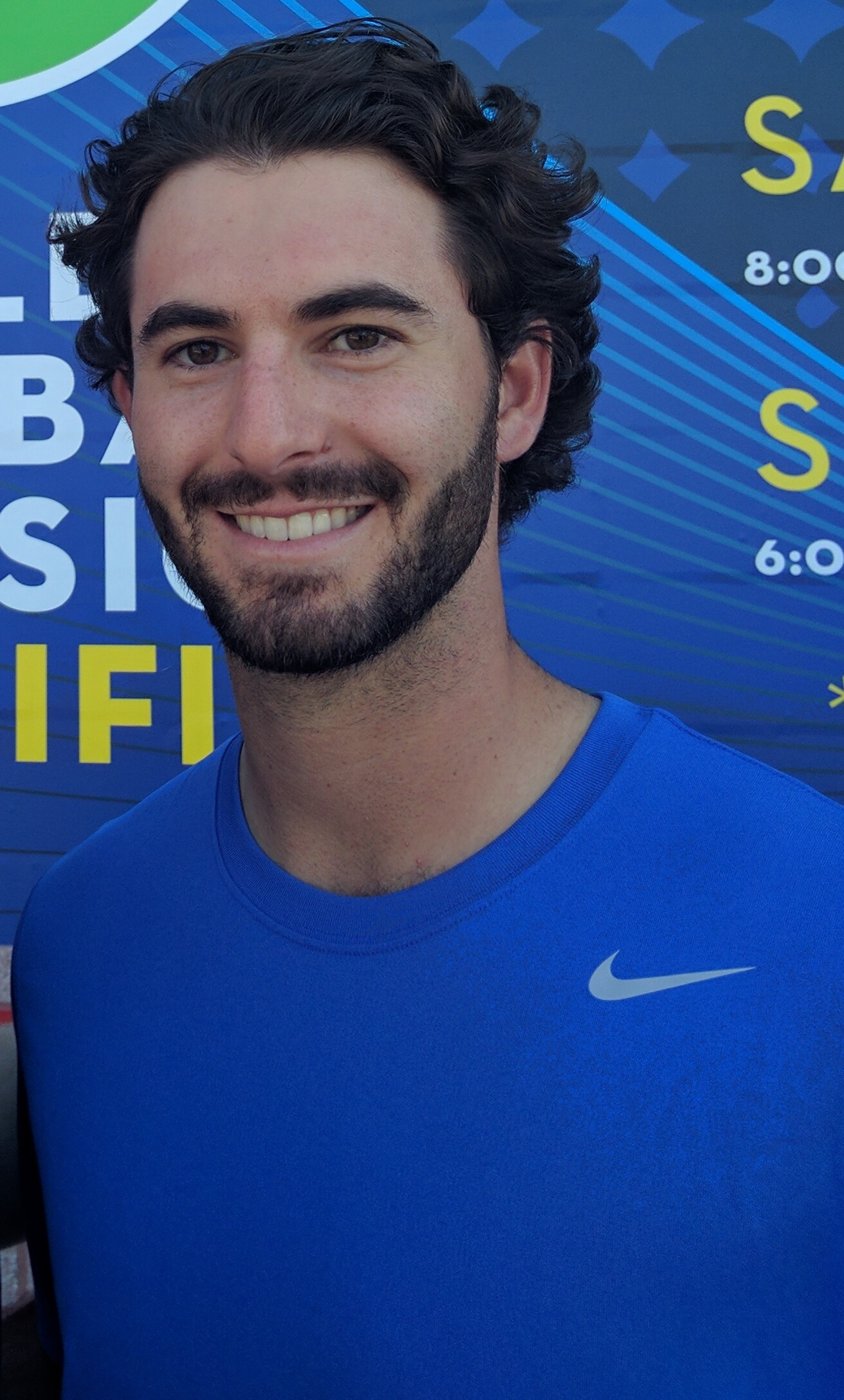
- Wagman prior to a Team Israel game in 2016
- Pitcher
- Born: July 25, 1991 (age 34); Walnut Creek, California, U.S.
- Bats: Left Throws: Right
- Stats at Baseball Reference
Medals
Men's baseball
Representing Israel
European Baseball Championship
Silver medal – second place	2021 Turin	Team

Joseph Samuel Wagman (Hebrew: ג'ואי ואגמן; born July 25, 1991) is an American-Israeli right-handed former professional baseball pitcher. He also plays for the Israel National Baseball Team.

Wagman attended college at Cal Poly, where he was twice voted to the NCAA Big West Conference All-Conference Team, and was named a Louisville Slugger All American. He established the school record for victories in a season, with 13.

He was drafted by the Chicago White Sox in the 17th round of the 2013 Major League Baseball draft. Pitching for the Rockford Aviators of the independent Frontier League in 2014, Wagman led the league in strikeouts and was named to the Frontier League All-Star Team.

Wagman pitched for Team Israel at the 2017 World Baseball Classic. In 2018, he became a dual Israeli citizen. Wagman competed on the Israel national baseball team at the 2019 European Baseball Championship. He also pitched for the team at the Africa/Europe 2020 Olympic Qualification tournament in Italy in September 2019, which Israel won to qualify to play baseball at the 2020 Summer Olympics. He pitched for Team Israel at the 2020 Summer Olympics in Tokyo in the summer of 2021. He pitched for Team Israel in the 2023 World Baseball Classic.

== Early and personal life ==
Wagman was born in Danville, California, to Steven and Karyn Wagman, and is Jewish. He has a sister named Molly.

In October 2018 he became a dual Israeli citizen, partly to help Israel’s baseball team make the 2020 Olympics.

== High school ==
Wagman attended Monte Vista High School in Danville, graduating in 2009. There, Wagman was honorable mention All-East Bay Athletic League as a center fielder as he batted .422 as a senior, and also pitched for the Mustangs.

== College ==
Wagman then attended college at Cal Poly, where he earned a degree in International Business. In 2010, he played summer baseball for the Walla Walla Sweets of the summer collegiate West Coast League, going 2-2 record with a 2.65 ERA. In 2011, he played summer baseball for the Wisconsin Rapids Rafters in Northwoods League.

In both 2012 and 2013 Wagman was voted to the NCAA Big West Conference All-Conference Team as a starting pitcher. He was also named a Louisville Slugger All American. In 2012, he was third in the conference in wins, with 9, and fifth in strikeouts, with 79. In 2013, he established the school record for victories in a season with 13 (going 13-3, with a 2.96 ERA), as he led the Big West Conference in wins and strikeouts (103) and tied for the conference lead in complete games with 3. His 27 career victories are tied for second all-time at the school, and his 259 career strikeouts are fifth all-time at the school.

== Professional career ==
=== Chicago White Sox ===
Wagman was drafted by the Chicago White Sox in the 17th round of the 2013 Major League Baseball draft. Wagman began his professional career in 2013 with the Great Falls Voyagers of the Rookie Pioneer League, going 1-0 with a 3.57 ERA in 16 relief appearances. In 2014, he started six games for the Beloit Snappers of the A-Full Midwest League, going 2-2 with a 5.13 ERA. He was released by the White Sox in April 2014.

=== Rockford Aviators ===
He then pitched for the Rockford Aviators of the independent Frontier League, going 6-2 with a 3.05 ERA and striking out 85 (leading the league) in 76.2 innings, and being named to the 2014 Frontier League All-Star Team for the West Division. He threw four pitches; a fastball in the high 80s, a curveball, a slider, and a changeup.

=== Oakland Athletics ===
In July 2014 he was signed to a minor league contract as a free agent by the Oakland Athletics.

In 2015, Wagman pitched 24 games (15 starts) for Beloit going 8-4 with one save and a 3.91 ERA, 6.2 innings for the Stockton Ports of the Class A-Advanced California League, and one start for the Midland RockHounds of the AA Texas League (going 1-0 with a 1.80 ERA).

In 2016, Wagman pitched again for the Stockton Ports, going 4-6 with 2 saves and a 3.67 ERA and 78 strikeouts in 76 innings, and four starts for the Midland RockHounds in which he went 1-1. In 2017, Wagman pitched again for the Stockton Ports, going 4-2 in 37 games (second on the team) with 1 save and a 4.86 ERA in 53.2 innings of relief. He was released from the Athletics organization on March 30, 2018.

=== Southern Maryland Blue Crabs ===
On April 18, 2018, Wagman signed with the Southern Maryland Blue Crabs of the independent Atlantic League of Professional Baseball, for whom he was 0-4 in 12 games with an ERA of 8.33. He was released on June 18, 2018.

=== Lincoln Saltdogs ===
On June 24, 2018, he signed with the Lincoln Saltdogs of the American Association. Wagman was released on June 28, 2018, after pitching in one game, due to injury.

=== Milwaukee Milkmen ===
On July 16, 2019, Wagman signed with the Milwaukee Milkmen of the American Association. He was 1-4 in seven starts for the team in 2019, with a 4.79 ERA. Wagman was released by the Milkmen on March 9, 2020.

=== Tempo Praha ===
In 2021, Wagman played for Tempo Praha in Prague, Czech Republic, which plays in the Czech Baseball Extraliga. He was 5-2 with a 1.98 ERA, one complete game, and 74 strikeouts in 71.1 innings, as batters hit .218 against him.

=== Sioux Falls Canaries ===
On August 16, 2021, Wagman signed with the Sioux Falls Canaries of the American Association. He was 1-4 in five starts for the team, with a 4.50 ERA. Wagman was released by the Canaries on January 7, 2022.

=== El Águila de Veracruz ===
On February 3, 2022, Wagman signed with El Águila de Veracruz of the Mexican League. In 6 starts, Wagman went 2-0 with a 3.47 ERA and 13 strikeouts in 23.1 innings. He was released by Veracruz on June 22.

=== Bravos de León ===
On July 15, 2022, Wagman signed with the Bravos de León of the Mexican League. In 3 starts covering 12 1/3 innings, he went 0-2 with a 10.95 ERA. Wagman was released by León on December 21.

== Team Israel ==
Wagman was on the roster for Israel at the 2017 World Baseball Classic qualifier, however he did not make an appearance during the tournament. He pitched for Team Israel at the 2017 World Baseball Classic, in March 2017.

Wagman competed on the Israel national baseball team for qualification for the 2020 Olympics. He started one game and pitched in one game in relief as the team played in the 2019 European Baseball Championship - B-Pool in early July 2019 in Blagoevgrad, Bulgaria, winning all of its games and advancing to the playoffs against Team Lithuania in the 2019 Playoff Series at the end of July 2019 for the last qualifying spot for the 2019 European Baseball Championship. He was 0-0 with one save and a 1.50 ERA with 9 strikeouts in 6 innings. He got the win in Game 1 of the 3-game playoff series against Lithuania, after pitching 6 innings in the 12-2 victory.

He pitched for Team Israel at the 2019 European Baseball Championship, where Wagman led all pitchers in the Championship with a 0.00 ERA over 10.2 innings and was second in batting average with runners on (.059) and eighth in opposing batting average (.189), as he was 1-0 in three games and gave up seven hits and four walks as he struck out eight batters.

Wagman also pitched for the team at the Africa/Europe 2020 Olympic Qualification tournament in Italy in September 2019, which Israel won to qualify to play baseball at the 2020 Summer Olympics in Tokyo. In game 1 of the tournament he pitched Team Israel to a shutout victory over European bronze medal winner Team Spain. Wagman tied for the lead among all pitchers in the tournament with two wins, and led in complete games (1) and strikeouts (14), while going 2-0 with an 0.56 ERA in two starts and pitching 16 innings while giving up nine hits and zero walks, and keeping batters to an opposing batting average of .161. Wagman said: "This has been the best baseball experience of my life."

He pitched for Team Israel at the 2020 Summer Olympics in Tokyo in the summer of 2021. He was 0-2, as in two starts he pitched 6.2 innings and gave up six earned runs.

Wagman pitched for Team Israel in the 2023 World Baseball Classic. He played for Team Israel manager Ian Kinsler, and alongside two-time All Star outfielder Joc Pederson, starting pitcher Dean Kremer, and others.

== See also ==
- List of select Jewish baseball players
