= Jonathan de Marte =

American baseball player (born 1993)

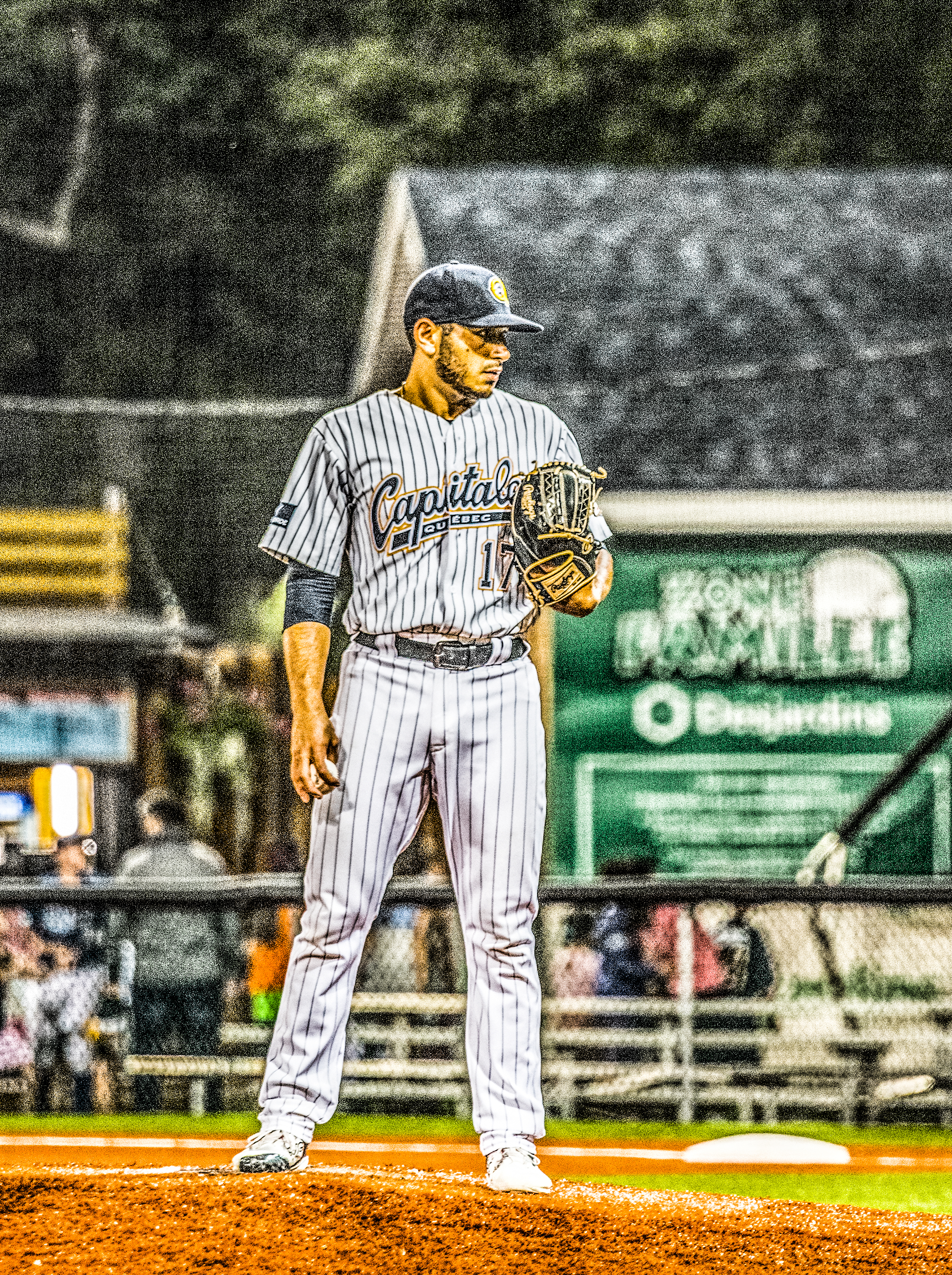
- Jonathan de Marte on the mound during a Quebec Capitales game, August 2019
- Pitcher
- Born: April 29, 1993 (age 33); Yorktown Heights, New York
- Bats: Right Throws: Right
- Stats at Baseball Reference

Jonathan de Marte (born April 29, 1993) is an American-Israeli professional baseball player who plays as pitcher for the Israel national baseball team. He is 6 feet 1 inch tall and weighs 205 lb. As a high school player, he was a two-time New York State Gatorade Player of the Year. He played college baseball for the University of Richmond.

In 2018, he became a dual Israeli citizen. In 2020, he signed a minor league contract with the Chicago Cubs; however, he did not pitch for them due to the COVID-19 pandemic. He plays for the Israel National Baseball Team, and pitched for Team Israel at the 2019 European Baseball Championship. He also pitched for the team at the Africa/Europe 2020 Olympic Qualification tournament in Italy in September 2019, which Israel won to qualify to play baseball at the 2020 Summer Olympics. He pitched for Team Israel at the 2020 Summer Olympics in Tokyo in the summer of 2021.

== Early life and education ==
de Marte was born into a Jewish family. His father, Vincent de Marte, is a criminal defense lawyer, and his mother, Dorrie Derfler, is a probation officer. Jonathan celebrated his bar mitzvah at Temple Beth Am in Yorktown Heights. Growing up in Yorktown Heights, New York, de Marte attended Lakeland High School in Yorktown Heights, New York, where as both a junior in 2010 and a senior in 2011 he was named the best high school baseball player in New York State, as the New York State Gatorade Player of the Year. He was also named the 2010 Louisville Slugger New York Player of the Year, a 2011 Louisville Slugger All-American, a two-time State Player of the Year by the New York Sportswriters, a two-time All-State pick, and a three-time All-Section and All-League honoree. As a senior he was 6-1 as a pitcher with a 1.22 ERA, and had 59 strikeouts and gave up five walks in 40 innings, while as a batter he hit .492 with 20 RBIs.

de Marte attended the University of Richmond, in Richmond, Virginia. In 2013, as a redshirt freshman pitcher, he was 5–0 with a 4.11 ERA. The following season, before joining the disabled list due to injury, he was 2–4 with a 9.97 ERA. He sat out 2015, and in 2016 he batted .319 in 17 games and played third base. In 2017, he was team captain and had a team-best 2.67 ERA and four saves as a relief pitcher, and as a hitter he batted .294 with a team-best five home runs. He was an Atlantic 10 All-Academic honoree. He received an undergraduate degree in Rhetoric and Communications, and a graduate degree in Human Resources Management.

== Professional career ==
=== Normal CornBelters ===
On June 22, 2017, de Marte signed with the Normal CornBelters of the Frontier League, for whom in 2017 he was 2–1 with a 5.53 ERA in 20 appearances, while striking out 36 batters in 27 2/3 innings.

Pitching for the CornBelters again in 2018, he was 3–4 with 7 saves (tied for 8th in the league) and a 2.87 ERA in 42 relief appearances (tied for 5th), while striking out 58 batters in 53 1/3 innings.

=== York Revolutions ===
On September 6, 2018, de Marte signed with the York Revolution of the Atlantic League of Professional Baseball. He pitched five innings for the team in 2018, and recorded a 3.60 ERA with five strikeouts.

In October 2018 he obtained dual Israeli citizenship, aiming to bolster Israel's baseball team in their quest to qualify for the 2020 Olympics.

On March 6, 2019, he re-signed with the Revolution, playing with the team until May 10, and pitching 5 2/3 innings.

=== Québec Capitales ===
In 2019, de Marte also played for Les Capitales de Quebec of the Canadian-American Association, beginning pitching for the club on May 17 and accumulating a record of 3-2 and five saves (7th in the league) and a 2.23 ERA. In 40 1/3 innings for Québec across 35 games, he gave up 27 hits and 15 walks while striking out 42 batters.

He signed a non-binding contract to play for the Perth Heat in the Australian Baseball League in the beginning of 2020.

=== Chicago Cubs ===
On February 26, 2020, de Marte signed a minor league contract with the Chicago Cubs. He did not play in a game in 2020 due to the cancellation of the minor league season because of the COVID-19 pandemic. On March 15, 2021, de Marte was released by the Cubs organization.

== Team Israel ==
de Marte competed on the Israel national baseball team for qualification for the 2020 Olympics. He pitched in relief in two games as the team played in the 2019 European Baseball Championship - B-Pool in early July 2019 in Blagoevgrad, Bulgaria, winning all of its games and advancing to the playoffs against Team Lithuania in the 2019 Playoff Series at the end of July 2019 for the last qualifying spot for the 2019 European Baseball Championship. He was 2–0 with a 3.60 ERA, as in 5 innings he struck out 5 batters, with his two wins tying for tops in the tournament.

In October 2018 he obtained dual Israeli citizenship, aiming to bolster Israel's baseball team in their quest to qualify for the 2020 Olympics.

He pitched for Team Israel at the 2019 European Baseball Championship, going 1–0 with a 0.00 ERA as in three relief appearances he pitched 5 innings and gave up 4 hits and no walks as he struck out 8 batters, and was credited with the win against Team Germany. He also pitched for the team at the Africa/Europe 2020 Olympic Qualification tournament in Italy in September 2019, which Israel won to qualify to play baseball at the 2020 Summer Olympics in Tokyo. In the tournament he was 0–0 with a 0.00 ERA over 4.0 innings in which he had 7 strikeouts while giving up one hit and zero walks.

In the Olympics, he was slated to be the team's closer. He pitched 1.1 innings over two games for Team Israel at the 2020 Summer Olympics in Tokyo in the summer of 2021.

== See also ==
- List of select Jewish baseball players
