= Mitch Glasser =

American-Israeli baseball player (born 1989)

- Utility player
- Born: October 15, 1989 (age 37); Chicago, Illinois, U.S.
- Bats: Right Throws: Right
- Stats at Baseball Reference

Career highlights and awards
- All-Olympic Baseball Team (2021)
Medals
Men's baseball
Representing Israel
European Baseball Championship
Silver medal – second place	2021 Turin	Team

Mitchell Emri Glasser (Hebrew: מיטש גלסר; born October 15, 1989) is an American-Israeli former professional baseball player. He also plays for the Israel National Baseball Team.

In high school, Glasser was Illinois Independent School League MVP as a senior. At Macalester College, he was all-Minnesota Intercollegiate Athletic Conference four times, and in 2011 he was the most difficult player in NCAA Division III to strike out.

Glasser was drafted by the Chicago White Sox in the 39th round of the 2012 Major League Baseball draft. A right-handed hitter, he plays second base, third base, and outfield.

He played for Team Israel at the 2019 European Baseball Championship. He also played for the team at the Africa/Europe 2020 Olympic Qualification tournament in Italy in September 2019, which Israel won to qualify to play baseball at the 2020 Summer Olympics. He played primarily right field for Team Israel at the 2020 Summer Olympics in Tokyo in the summer of 2021, and had a .474 on base percentage which was 5th-highest at the Olympic Games.

== Early and personal life ==
Glasser was born in Chicago, Illinois, and grew up on Chicago's North Side. He is Jewish, and was actively involved in his Jewish community. He attended a Jewish day school in Chicago for 11 years. He was named after Cubs reliever Mitch Williams. Glasser's favorite baseball team during his childhood was the Chicago White Sox. He attended the Latin School of Chicago for high school on Chicago's Near North Side, where he played shortstop on the baseball team and was Illinois Independent School League MVP as a senior. In 2019 he became an Israeli citizen, thereby becoming a dual Israeli-American.

== College ==
Glasser went to NCAA Division III Macalester College in Minnesota, where he majored in Psychology. In 2010, he batted .348 and led the Minnesota Intercollegiate Athletic Conference (MIAC) conference with six triples, and was named a Jewish Sports Review All American. In 2011, Glasser led the Scots in batting average (.408) and total bases (74), and tied for the lead in home runs (4), and was again named a Jewish Sports Review All American. He ranked second on the team in RBIs (30) and hits (49). He was the most difficult player in Division III to strike out (only 1 time in 120 at bats), and was named MIAC Player of the Week on April 11. He was awarded MIAC all-conference honors four times. In his college career he batted .357 with 180 hits (4th in school history), 95 RBIs, and 109 runs scored in 148 games, and stole 31 bases in 37 attempts.

== Professional career ==
=== Chicago White Sox ===
Glasser was drafted by his hometown Chicago White Sox in the 39th round of the 2012 Major League Baseball draft. He played with the Bristol White Sox in the Rookie-level Appalachian League in 2013. After being released by the Chicago White Sox in July 2013, he played for the Melbourne Aces of the Australian Baseball League in 2014.

=== Joplin Blasters ===
On May 19, 2015, Glasser signed with the Joplin Blasters of the American Association of Independent Professional Baseball in the team's inaugural season. He made 85 appearances for the team, batting .265/.362/.306 and 11 sacrifice hits (tied for second in the league) and 8 hit-by-pitch (tied for 9th). In the final game of the season Glasser played all nine positions in the field.

In 2016 Glasser had the best season of his four-year professional career for the Blasters. He batted .317/.411 (7th in the league)/.417 with 47 RBIs and 16 stolen bases and leading the league with 16 hit-by-pitch.

=== Cleburne Railroaders ===
In 2017 he played for the Cleburne Railroaders of the American Association. Glasser batted .282/.380/.352 with three home runs, 33 RBIs, 18 stolen bases, and 14 HBP (4th in the league) in 347 at bats, playing 37 games at third base, 30 at second base, and 21 in the outfield.

After the season, Glasser was traded to the Winnipeg Goldeyes of the American Association of Independent Professional Baseball.

=== Gary SouthShore RailCats ===
Glasser was later traded to the Gary SouthShore RailCats of the American Association of Independent Professional Baseball later in the season. For Gary, he batted .228/.343/.283 in 2018.

=== Sioux Falls Canaries ===
Glasser was waived by the RailCats on June 21, 2018, and claimed by the Sioux Falls Canaries of the American Association. In 2018 between the RailCats and the Canaries, he batted .273/.359/.302 with 28 RBIs, 10 HBP (tied for 6th in the league), and 6 sacrifice hits (tied for 9th) in 341 at bats. He played 62 games at second base, 20 at third base, 3 in the outfield, and one at shortstop.

Glasser later re-signed with the Canaries for the 2019 season, and also served as the team's hitting coach. The team agreed to let him play for Team Israel in their European qualifying tournament in Bulgaria in July 2019. Canaries manager Mike Meyer said: "We were putting together his contract this year and he said he would be missing potentially 15 games for the qualifiers. I said that it was an amazing opportunity, and that we were going to make it work." Playing for the Canaries in 2019, he batted .264/.363/.338 with 3 home runs and 38 RBIs, while playing 45 games at third base, 24 at first base, 10 at second base, and one game in right field. He was released by the team on January 7, 2020.

On April 30, 2020, Glasser signed with the Chicago Dogs of the American Association. He was released prior to the season on July 3, 2020.

On May 3, 2021, Glasser re-signed with the Sioux Falls Canaries of the American Association as a non-roster invitee to training camp. He was later named as the team's bench coach for the 2021 season, thus becoming a player-coach for the second time in his career. Playing for the Canaries in 2021, Glasser batted .286/.407/.397 with 2 home runs and 28 RBIs, while playing 28 games at second base, 11 in right field, 10 in center field, five in right field, three at first base, and two at third base. He was released by the Canaries following the season on January 31, 2022.

== Team Israel ==
By virtue of his Jewish heritage, Glasser played for the Israel at the 2017 World Baseball Classic qualifier. Glasser appeared in the first and second games of the qualifier as a late-inning defensive replacement, and did not have an at bat.

Glasser competed on the Israel national baseball team for qualification for the 2020 Olympics. He started all six games at second base as the team played in the 2019 European Baseball Championship - B-Pool in early July 2019 in Blagoevgrad, Bulgaria, winning all of its games and advancing to the playoffs against Team Lithuania in the 2019 Playoff Series at the end of July 2019 for the last qualifying spot for the 2019 European Baseball Championship. He batted .421 (6th in the tournament)/.586 (4th)/.842 (4th) in the B-Pool tournament with 10 runs scored (tied for 1st), 8 walks (2nd), 2 doubles (tied for 4th), and 9 RBIs (3rd) in 19 at bats.

He played for Team Israel at the 2019 European Baseball Championship. He also played for the team at the Africa/Europe 2020 Olympic Qualification tournament in Italy in September 2019, which Israel won to qualify to play baseball at the 2020 Summer Olympics in Tokyo. He played second base and batted .200/.261/.250 with 6 RBIs (tied for 4th) in the tournament.

He played primarily right field for Team Israel at the 2020 Summer Olympics in Tokyo in the summer of 2021, and had a .474 on base percentage which was 5th-highest at the Olympic Games. He batted .412/.474/.588 in 17 at bats.
