= Alon Leichman =

Israeli baseball player and coach (born 1989)

Alon Leichman אלון ליישמן
- Born: May 29, 1989 (age 37); Kibbutz Gezer, Israel
- Bats: Right Throws: Right

Teams
- As coach: Cincinnati Reds (2023–2024); Miami Marlins (2025); Colorado Rockies (2026)

Alon Leichman (Hebrew: אלון ליישמן; born May 29, 1989) is an Israeli former professional baseball pitcher who pitches and coaches for Team Israel and has previously served as the assistant pitching coach for the Cincinnati Reds, Colorado Rockies and Miami Marlins.

Leichman was formerly the pitching coach of the Tacoma Rainiers (the Triple-A affiliate of the Seattle Mariners in the Pacific Coast League), the Peoria Javelinas in the Arizona Fall League, and other teams.

Leichman plays and coaches for Team Israel. He pitched for UC San Diego Tritons and Cypress College, leading them to the 2013 CCCAA state title. He coached Team Israel at the 2017 World Baseball Classic, in South Korea and Japan. He pitched for Team Israel at the 2019 European Baseball Championship. He also pitched for the team at the Africa/Europe 2020 Olympic Qualification tournament in Italy in 2019, which Israel won to qualify to play baseball at the 2020 Summer Olympics. He pitched one perfect inning for Team Israel against Team USA in the 2020 Summer Olympics in Tokyo in 2021.

== Personal life ==
Leichman was born and grew up in kibbutz Gezer, Israel, about halfway between Jerusalem and Tel Aviv. His parents David Leichman and Marilyn Gold immigrated to Israel from New York and Michigan respectively in the 1970s. Leichman has two siblings, Eliora and Arishai. He graduated from Givat Brenner Regional School in 2007. Following high school, Leichman served three years with the Israel Defense Forces, from 2007 to 2010. He is good friends with, and works out with, major league pitcher Joe Musgrove. His denomination is Reform Judaism. He has a black belt in jujitsu.

== Team Israel ==
During the off-season, Leichman competes for the Israeli national baseball team in international tournaments.

=== European Baseball Championship ===
Leichman competed for Israel during the qualifying round of the 2010 European Baseball Championship, in 2008. During the opening game, against Bulgaria, he started at shortstop and batted 8th, going 0-for-2 with 2 walks and 2 runs scored, before becoming a relief pitcher giving up 1 run on 1 hit in his 1 inning. During the second game, against Croatia, Leichman was the starting pitcher and went 8 innings, giving up 6 hits and 2 earned runs, while walking 5 and striking out 9, before switching to shortstop in the 9th and batted 1-for-4 while striking out 3 times. During the third game, he started at shortstop against Serbia, going 0-for-2 with 2 walks and scoring 2 runs. During the fourth and final game, against Lithuania, Leichman once again played shortstop and batted 5th, going 0-for-4 finishing the qualifier with a .083 batting average.

Leichman competed for Israel during the qualifying round of the 2012 European Baseball Championship, in 2011, and was the designated hitter in all five games. During the opening game, against Georgia, he batted second and hit a double in 3 at bats, with 2 RBIs and a walk. During the second game, against Great Britain, batting third, Leichman went 0-for-3 with a strikeout. During the third game, against Lithuania, he batted third and got a double in 4 at bats with a walk, 2 RBIs and a run. In the first game of the home/away finals against Great Britain, Leichman hit a double in four at bats with a walk and scored two runs. Later that same day, Leichman batted second, and went 1-for-4 with a run scored.

Leichman competed for Israel during the qualifying round of the 2016 European Baseball Championship. During the C-Level qualifier in 2014, he only pitched in the finals game against Slovenia, pitching a complete game shutout, giving up only one hit, while walking 1 and striking out 9. Leichman's only appearance in the B-Level qualifier in 2015 was in the second game, against Poland, where he pitched 8 innings while giving up four earned runs, on eight hits, and struck out 5.

Leichman competed on the Israel national baseball team for qualification for the 2020 Olympics. He started one game as the team played in the 2019 European Baseball Championship - B-Pool in early July 2019 in Blagoevgrad, Bulgaria, winning all of its games and advancing to the playoffs against Team Lithuania in the 2019 Playoff Series at the end of July 2019 for the last qualifying spot for the 2019 European Baseball Championship. He was 0-0 with an 11.12 ERA in 5.2 innings.

He also pitched for the team at the Africa/Europe 2020 Olympic Qualification tournament in Italy in September 2019, which Israel won to qualify to play baseball at the 2020 Summer Olympics in Tokyo.

=== World Baseball Classic ===
Leichman was on the roster for Israel during 2013 World Baseball Classic, however he did not make an appearance. He was later the bullpen coach for Israel at the 2017 World Baseball Classic qualifier. He returned in the same role for Team Israel at the 2017 World Baseball Classic.

=== Olympics ===
Leichman pitched one perfect inning for Team Israel against Team USA in the 2020 Summer Olympics in Tokyo in the summer of 2021.

== Playing career ==
=== MLB European Academy ===
Leichman was the first Israeli to represent Israel in the MLB European Academy, which included coaches from MLB such as Barry Larkin, Rod Carew, Lee Smith, and Bruce Hurst.

=== College ===
Leichman attended Cypress College from 2010 to 2013, and was a member of the baseball team for three seasons. He was supposed to be the closer for the 2011 season, before he popped his elbow during his first appearance. Leichman needed Tommy John surgery to repair a torn ulnar collateral ligament in his elbow, was out for all of the 2011 season, and pitched only 11 1/3 innings during 2012. He pitched for the Menlo Park Legends of the California Collegiate League, the summer college league, in order to help recover from Tommy John surgery. While playing he earned the First-Team All-Far West League honors with a 2.18 ERA in 53 2/3 innings. Leichman came back in 2013 to aid the Chargers to a State Championship, logging a 1.42 ERA over 31 2/3 innings, highlighted by a complete-game shutout in a spot start to win the super regional.

Leichman then spent three years playing for the UC San Diego Tritons, while getting his history degree at UC San Diego, until he graduated in 2016. While there, he had a second operation, as the first surgery had not been successful. He aided the team to back-to-back postseason appearances, while pitching in pain. Career 3.50 ERA in 122 innings, striking out 85 batters to only 20 walks. As a junior, Leichman made 12 starts and 1 relief appearance, going 7-2 with a 3.71 ERA and walked just nine in 53 1/3 innings. As a senior, he made 9 starts and 5 relief appearances, working 68 2/3 innings with 48 strikeouts.

== Coaching career ==
=== Yarmouth–Dennis Red Sox ===
He served as a pitching coach for the Yarmouth–Dennis Red Sox in the collegiate summer Cape Cod Baseball League, which won the 2016 championship.

=== Los Angeles Dodgers ===
The Los Angeles Dodgers recruited Leichman to coach for their organization in the instructional league, helping develop Dodgers pitching prospects, in late 2016.

=== Seattle Mariners ===
Six months after graduating from college, Leichman was Coordinator of Organizational Learning for the Seattle Mariners' player development program in 2017, supporting the organization's minor league managers and coaches. In 2018 he was the Pitching Coach of the Mariners Dominican Academy in the Dominican Summer League.

In 2019, Leichman was the pitching coach of the West Virginia Power, a Single-A affiliate of the Seattle Mariners in the South Atlantic League.

In 2020 and 2021, Leichman was the pitching coach of the Arkansas Travelers, a Double-A affiliate of the Seattle Mariners in the Double-A Central.

In 2022, Leichman served as the pitching coach for the Triple-A Tacoma Rainiers of the Pacific Coast League.

In the fall of 2022, Leichman was the pitching coach of the Peoria Javelinas in the Arizona Fall League.

=== Cincinnati Reds (2023–2024) ===
In December 2022, at 33 years of age, Leichman was named the assistant pitching coach of the Cincinnati Reds in Major League Baseball. He became the first Israeli coach in Major League Baseball.

=== Miami Marlins (2025) ===
On December 22, 2024, the Miami Marlins hired Leichman for the same role.

=== Colorado Rockies (2026) ===
On December 8, 2025, the Colorado Rockies hired Leichman to serve as the team's pitching coach. He was fired October 15, 2026 after an 100 loss season.

== See also ==
- List of baseball players who underwent Tommy John surgery
