= Eric Brodkowitz =

Israeli-American baseball player

Free agent
- Pitcher
- Born: May 14, 1996 (age 30); Potomac, Maryland, U.S.
- Bats: Right Throws: Right

Eric Brodkowitz (Hebrew: 'אריק ברודקוביץ; born May 14, 1996) is an American-Israeli professional baseball pitcher who is a free agent. He plays for the Israel National Baseball Team. Pitching for the Yale Bulldogs, he was named to the 2018 First Team All-Ivy League Team as a unanimous selection. In 2021, he has pitched for the Idaho Falls Chukars of the Pioneer League. Brodkowitz is also an investment banking analyst with Goldman Sachs.

== Early and personal life ==
Brodkowitz was born in Potomac, Maryland. He is Jewish, had a bar mitzvah, and went to Israel on Birthright. His parents are Ken and Jill Brodkowitz, and he has two younger siblings. His father pitched and played outfield and first base for Johns Hopkins University.

He attended Winston Churchill High School (Class of 2014), where he played baseball and was First Team All-Division in his junior and senior seasons, and All-Gazette and All-Met honorable mention in junior season. As a pitcher in his high school career he was 5–4 with a 1.36 ERA. He played for the Gaithersburg Giants in the Cal Ripken Collegiate Baseball League during the summers of 2014 and 2015.

In October 2018 Brodkowitz became a dual Israeli citizen, partly to help the Israel baseball team make the 2020 Olympics.

== College ==
Brodkowitz attended Yale University, double majoring in economics and molecular, cellular, and developmental biology with a concentration in biotechnology. He pitched for the Yale Bulldogs. He was named 2015 Ivy League Rookie of the Week on April 21 and to the 2015 Ivy League Weekly Honor Roll on March 31. He was also named 2017 and 2018 first team All-American (D-I) by the Jewish Sports Review, and to the 2018 First Team All-Ivy Team as a unanimous selection. Brodkowitz finished his senior season with a 2.76 ERA (leading the league) in 84.2 innings pitched (2nd in the Ivy League), as he led the conference with six wins without a loss, with a 1.028 WHIP (5th).

== Minor leagues ==
In 2021, he has pitched for the Idaho Falls Chukars of the Pioneer League.

== Israel national team ==
Brodkowitz competed on the Israel national baseball team for qualification for the 2020 Olympics. He started two games as the team played in the 2019 European Baseball Championship - B-Pool in early July 2019 in Blagoevgrad, Bulgaria, winning all of its games and advancing to the playoffs against Team Lithuania in the 2019 Playoff Series at the end of July 2019 for the last qualifying spot for the 2019 European Baseball Championship. He was 1–0 with a 5.79 ERA, as in 9.1 innings he struck out 15 batters, tops in the tournament.

He pitched for Team Israel in the 2019 European Baseball Championship. He also pitched for the team at the Africa/Europe 2020 Olympic Qualification tournament in Italy in September 2019, which Israel won to qualify to play baseball at the 2020 Summer Olympics in Tokyo.

== Career outside baseball ==
Brodkowitz is a healthcare investment banking analyst with Goldman Sachs.
