= Israel national baseball team =

Israel National Baseball Team

Information
- Country: Israel
- Federation: Israel Association of Baseball
- Confederation: Confederation of European Baseball
- Manager: Brad Ausmus
- Captain: Harrison Bader
- Team Colors: Azure, White, Charcoal Gray

WBSC ranking
- Current: 22 (26 October 2026)
- Highest: 18 (2 times; latest in March 2020)
- Lowest: 74 (December 2012)

Olympic Games
- Appearances: 1 (first in 2020)
- Best result: 5th

World Baseball Classic
- Appearances: 2 (first in 2017)
- Best result: 6th (2017)

European Championship
- Appearances: 4 (first in 2019)
- Best result: 2nd (silver) (2021)

The Israel National Baseball Team (Hebrew: נבחרת ישראל בבייסבול) also known as "The Mensch" represents Israel in international baseball competitions. It is managed by Nate Fish.

At the 2017 WBC, Team Israel came in 6th. In 2022, Israel was ranked 20th in the world. The Israel national baseball team competed at the 2020 Summer Olympics in 2021, where it beat Mexico and finished 5th. It also competed in the 2023 World Baseball Classic, where it did not progress to the quarterfinal round.

The team competed in the 2026 World Baseball Classic from March 6–11, 2026, at LoanDepot Park in Miami in Pool D. It faced Team Venezuela, Team Netherlands, Team Dominican Republic, and Team Nicaragua.

== History ==
In the 1970s American immigrants started playing baseball in Israel. In December 1986, the Israel Association of Baseball (IAB) was formed as a non-profit organization to develop baseball in Israel. Israel has baseball teams in all age groups from 10 to 30.

In 2015, Israel senior national team pitcher Dean Kremer became the first Israeli to be selected in the Major League Baseball draft. He was picked by the San Diego Padres in the 38th round. Kremer opted to fulfill his college commitment, and play for the UNLV Rebels baseball team. After playing for the Rebels for the 2016 season, Kremer was drafted by the Los Angeles Dodgers in the 14th round of the 2016 draft. In 2019, Kremer reached Class AAA for the first time, pitching for the Norfolk Tides of the International League. In 2020, Kremer made his debut for the Baltimore Orioles, becoming the first Israeli citizen to pitch in the major leagues.

Prior to the 2017 World Baseball Classic (WBC), Israel was the 41st-ranked national baseball team in the world (and ranked 16th in Europe). After its performance in the 2017 WBC, in which Team Israel came in 6th, the team was ranked 19th in the world (and 4th in Europe). The most recent ranking was released in 2022, with Israel ranked 20th in the world. The Israel national baseball team that competed at the 2020 Summer Olympics was composed mostly of Israeli-American Jews, with four Israeli-born players.

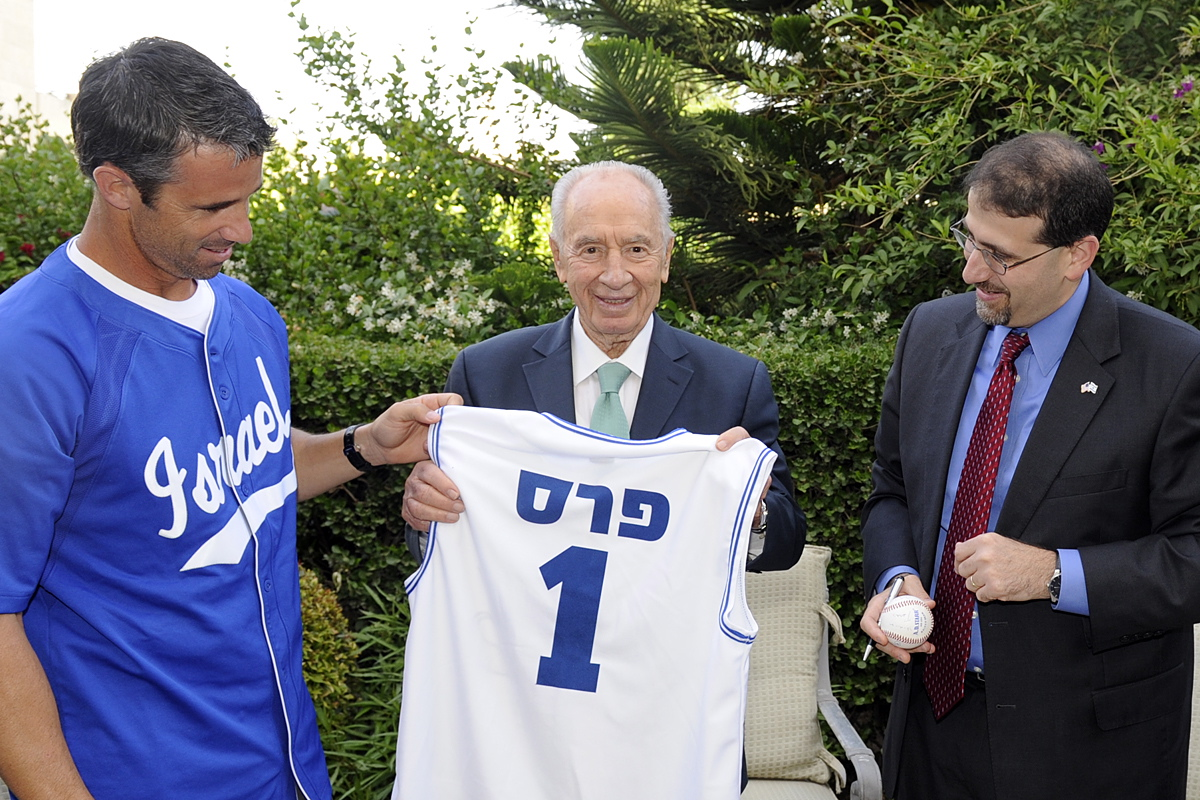
From left to right, current team manager Brad Ausmus, Shimon Peres, and Daniel B. Shapiro.

In 2019 Israel won the European Baseball B-Pool competition, with a 5–0 record. It then won the best-of-three 2019 European Qualification Playoff Series, with a 2–0 record. Consequently, it qualified for the 2019 European Baseball Championship 12-team tournament in Germany, where it came in fourth. As one of the top five teams in the Championship, it thereby moved on to compete in the Africa/Europe 2020 Olympic Qualification tournament. It won that tournament, and thus qualified to be one of six national teams that competed in 2021 in baseball at the 2020 Tokyo Olympics.

During international trips in 2019, the team gathered for Shabbat dinner on Friday nights, including teammates who were not personally religious.

At the Olympics in 2021 the team faced Japan, Mexico, South Korea, the United States, and the Dominican Republic. Israel beat Mexico but finished 5th, after losing to the Dominican Republic 7-6 in the Round 2 repechage.

The team also competed in the 2023 World Baseball Classic, where it defeated Nicaragua but lost to Venezuela and did not progress to the quarterfinal round. However, its win guaranteed it a spot in the following Classic. Among the players who played for the team were All Star outfielder Joc Pederson and starting pitcher Dean Kremer.

The senior national team manager is Israeli-American former Major League Baseball World Series champion, World Baseball Classic champion, four-time All Star, and Olympian Ian Kinsler.

== Results and fixtures ==
The following is a list of professional baseball match results currently active in the latest version of the WBSC World Rankings, as well as any future matches that have been scheduled.

Legend

Win Lose Void or postponed Fixture

=== 2023 ===
World Baseball Classic GS	March 12	Nicaragua	1–3	Israel	LoanDepot Park, Miami, United States
World Baseball Classic GS	12:00 ET	LP: Jonathan Loáisiga (0–1)	Boxscore	WP: Richard Bleier (1–0); Sv: Robert Stock (1)	Attendance: 19,955; Umpires: HP – Maikol Tibabijo, 1B – Ron Kulpa, 2B – Tim Meyer, 3B – Andy Fletcher

World Baseball Classic GS	March 13	Israel	0–10 (F/8)	Puerto Rico	LoanDepot Park, Miami, United States
World Baseball Classic GS	19:00 ET	LP: Colton Gordon (0–1)	Boxscore	WP: José De León (1–0)	Attendance: 27,813; Umpires: HP – Ron Kulpa, 1B – Alejandro Pecero, 2B – Chris Guccione, 3B – Tim Meyer

World Baseball Classic GS	March 14	Israel	0–10 (F/7)	Dominican Republic	LoanDepot Park, Miami, United States
World Baseball Classic GS	19:00 ET	LP: Jacob Steinmetz (0–1)	Boxscore	WP: Roansy Contreras (1–0); HR: Manny Machado (2)	Attendance: 33,307; Umpires: HP – Mike Estabrook, 1B – Andy Fletcher, 2B – Chris Graham, 3B – Maikol Tibabijo

World Baseball Classic GS	March 15	Venezuela	5–1	Israel	LoanDepot Park, Miami, United States
World Baseball Classic GS	12:00 ET	WP: Jesús Luzardo (1–0); HR: Eduardo Escobar (1), Eugenio Suárez (1)	Boxscore	LP: Robert Stock (0–1)	Attendance: 18,277; Umpires: HP – Andy Fletcher, 1B – Ángel Hernández, 2B – Maikol Tibabijo, 3B – Alejandro Pecero

=== 2025 ===
Euro Championship GS	September 20	France	4–8	Israel	Rotterdam, Netherlands
Euro Championship GS	13:00 CET		Boxscore		Attendance: 189

Euro Championship GS	September 21	Great Britain	16–1 (F/8)	Israel	Rotterdam, Netherlands
Euro Championship GS	13:00 CET		Boxscore		Attendance: 257

Euro Championship GS	September 22	Israel	1–9	Netherlands	Rotterdam, Netherlands
Euro Championship GS	19:30 CET		Boxscore		Attendance: 820

Euro Championship R16	September 24	Switzerland	1–9	Israel	Rotterdam, Netherlands
Euro Championship R16	13:00 CET		Boxscore		Attendance: 105

Euro Championship QF	September 25	Israel	3–4	Czech Republic	Rotterdam, Netherlands
Euro Championship QF	14:00 CET		Boxscore		Attendance: 93

Euro Championship RR	September 26	Israel	9–10	Germany	Rotterdam, Netherlands
Euro Championship RR	14:00 CET		Boxscore		Attendance: 153

Euro Championship 7th	September 27	Israel	11–5	Croatia	Rotterdam, Netherlands
Euro Championship 7th	11:00 CET		Boxscore		Attendance: 217

=== 2026 ===
World Baseball Classic GS	March 7	Israel	3 – 11	Venezuela	LoanDepot Park, Miami, United States
World Baseball Classic GS	19:00 ET	LP: Ben Simon (0-1); HR: RJ Schreck (1), Harrison Bader (1)	Boxscore	WP: Enmanuel De Jesus (1-0); HR: Eugenio Suarez (1), Luis Arraez (1, 2)	Attendance: 22,573; Umpires: HP – Gabe Morales, 1B – Marek Vicar, 2B – Paul Clemons, 3B – Michael Ulloa

World Baseball Classic GS	March 8	Nicaragua	0 – 5	Israel	LoanDepot Park, Miami, United States
World Baseball Classic GS	19:00 ET	LP: Carlos Rodríguez (0-1)	Boxscore	WP: Dean Kremer (1-0)	Attendance: 17,972; Umpires: HP – Alejandro Percero, 1B – Quinn Wolcott, 2B – Shane Livensparger, 3B – Trent Thomas

World Baseball Classic GS	March 9	Dominican Republic	10 – 1	Israel	LoanDepot Park, Miami, United States
World Baseball Classic GS	12:00 ET	WP: Brayan Bello (1-0); HR: Fernando Tatis Jr. (1), Oneil Cruz (2)	Boxscore	LP: Ryan Prager (0-1)	Attendance: 28,728; Umpires: HP – Quinn Wolcott, 1B – Gabe Morales, 2B – Michael Ulloa, 3B – Serge Makouchetchev

World Baseball Classic GS	March 10	Israel	6 – 2	Netherlands	LoanDepot Park, Miami, United States
World Baseball Classic GS	19:00 ET	WP: Josh Mallitz (1-0)	Boxscore	LP: Kevin Kelly (0-1)	Attendance: 13,565; Umpires: HP – Shane Livensparger, 1B – Quinn Wolcott, 2B – Marek Vicar, 3B – Michael Ulloa

== Technical staff ==
=== Managerial history ===
The development of baseball management in Israel traces its roots to the formal establishment of organized baseball activities under the Israel Association of Baseball in 1986. In the early years, the sport was largely developmental, with limited international competition and a small pool of locally based leadership overseeing training programs and amateur national selections.

One of the earlier managers of the Israel national baseball team was Leon Klarfeld (1994–1997), a key figure in the early development of organized baseball in Israel who helped stabilize the national program during its formative years under the Israel Association of Baseball. He was followed by Peter Kurz (1998), who managed the team during a transitional phase as Israel began increasing its participation in international competitions and strengthening its ties to European baseball structures.

In 1998, Peter Kurz holding dual Israeli and American affiliation, managed the team during a transitional phase in which Israel began to engage more consistently in international baseball, including early efforts that would later contribute to Olympic qualification pathways. Following this period, Klarfeld again resumed leadership from 1999 to 2002 as the program gradually expanded its participation in European tournaments.

A brief but notable transitional phase occurred in 2008–2009, when Australian baseball figure Shaun Smith was involved in Israel baseball activities during a period of organizational instability following the collapse of the Israel Baseball League in 2007. Although no fully professional league structure existed at the time, foreign technical influence remained important in sustaining the sport’s development efforts.

The modern era of Israeli baseball management began in the 2010s, when the team entered the World Baseball Classic system under Major League Baseball connected leadership. Brad Ausmus (2012–2013) led the team during its early WBC qualification success, followed by Jerry Weinstein (2016–2017) and Eric Holtz (2017–2020), who guided Israel through European Championships and Olympic qualification campaigns.

In the 2020s, leadership continued under dual-affiliated American-Israeli figures such as Nate Fish (2021–2022; 2023–2025) and Ian Kinsler (2023), reflecting the program’s hybrid identity combining Israeli development with American baseball expertise. Ausmus later returned to manage the team ahead of the 2026 World Baseball Classic.

- (Israel) Leon Klarfeld (1994–1997)
- (United States) / (Israel) Peter Kurz (1998)
- (Israel) Leon Klarfeld (1999–2002)
- (Israel) Eyal Horowitz (2003–2005)
- (Israel) Ariel Ben-David (2006–2007)
- (Australia) Shaun Smith (2008–2009)
- (Israel) Itay Shalev (2010–2011)
- (United States) Brad Ausmus (2012–2013)
- (United States) Jerry Weinstein (2016–2017)
- (United States) Eric Holtz (2017–2020)
- (United States) / (Israel) Nate Fish (2021–2022)
- (United States) / (Israel) Ian Kinsler (2023)
- (United States) / (Israel) Nate Fish (2023–2025)
- (United States) Brad Ausmus (2026–present)

== Current roster ==
=== 2026 World Baseball Classic ===
Israel roster – 2026 World Baseball Classic roster
Players		Coaches
Pitchers: 5 Charlie Beilenson; 44 Josh Blum; 66 Matt Bowman; 18 Harrison Cohen; 99 Daniel Federman; 33 Jordan Geber; 43 Tommy Kahnle; 64 Dean Kremer; 75 Rob Kaminsky; 60 Max Lazar; 40 Carlos Lequerica; 58 Josh Mallitz; 55 Eli Morgan; 12 Ryan Prager; 15 Ben Simon; 62 Robert Stock; 48 Zack Weiss	Catchers: 21 Garrett Stubbs; 36 C.J. Stubbs; Infielders: 8 Cole Carrigg; 45 Jake Gelof; 13 Spencer Horwitz; 4 Noah Mendlinger; 52 Matt Mervis; 22 Benjamin Rosengard; 7 Colby Halter; Outfielders: 2 Harrison Bader; 10 Zach Levenson; 0 RJ Schreck; 24 Assaf Lowengart	Manager: 12 Brad Ausmus; Coaches: 20 Kevin Youkilis (bench coach); 28 Brad Goldberg (pitching coach); 2 Blake Gailen (hitting coach); 5 Tyger Pederson (hitting coach); 19 Jason Bell (first base coach); 29 Mark Loretta (third base coach); 51 Jason Marquis (bullpen coach); 38 Jerry Narron (outfield coach); 7 Blake Dickman (bullpen catcher)

=== 2023 World Baseball Classic ===
Israel roster – 2023 World Baseball Classic roster
Players		Coaches
Pitchers: 59 Jake Bird; 35 Richard Bleier; 99 Daniel Federman; 31 Jake Fishman; 10 Brandon Gold; 26 Colton Gordon; 66 Andrew Gross; 37 Jake Kalish; 22 Rob Kaminsky; 47 Alex Katz; 56 Adam Kolarek; 32 Evan Kravetz; 17 Dean Kremer; 25 Shlomo Lipetz; 53 Jake Miednik; 41 Kyle Molnar; 0 Bubby Rossman; 45 Jacob Steinmetz; 89 Robert Stock; 14 Joey Wagman; 57 Zack Weiss; 30 Josh Wolf	Catchers: 36 Ryan Lavarnway; 1 C.J. Stubbs; 21 Garrett Stubbs; Infielders: 18 Zack Gelof; 55 Ty Kelly; 24 Assaf Lowengart; 4 Noah Mendlinger; 27 Matt Mervis; 19 Danny Valencia; 38 Michael Wielansky; Outfielders: 40 Alex Dickerson; 8 Jakob Goldfarb; 4 Spencer Horwitz; 23 Joc Pederson	Manager: 3 Ian Kinsler; Coaches: 12 Brad Ausmus (bench coach); 48 Jerry Narron (bench coach); 20 Kevin Youkilis (hitting coach); 28 Josh Zeid (pitching coach); 5 Tyger Pederson (first base coach); 2 Blake Gailen (third base coach); 16 Nate Fish (bullpen coach); 7 Tal Erel (bullpen catcher); 46 Simon Rosenbaum (coach)

== Competitions ==
=== World Baseball Classic ===
==== 2013 World Baseball Classic ====
Team Israel competed in the September 2012 Qualifier Round 1, in Jupiter, Florida, against Spain, France, and South Africa. Israel won easily in their first game. Israel then beat Spain in the winner's bracket. Spain then eliminated South Africa to earn a rematch with Israel, in the final game. Spain won the winner-take-all final game, 9–7 in 10 innings, to advance to the main tournament.

==== 2017 World Baseball Classic ====
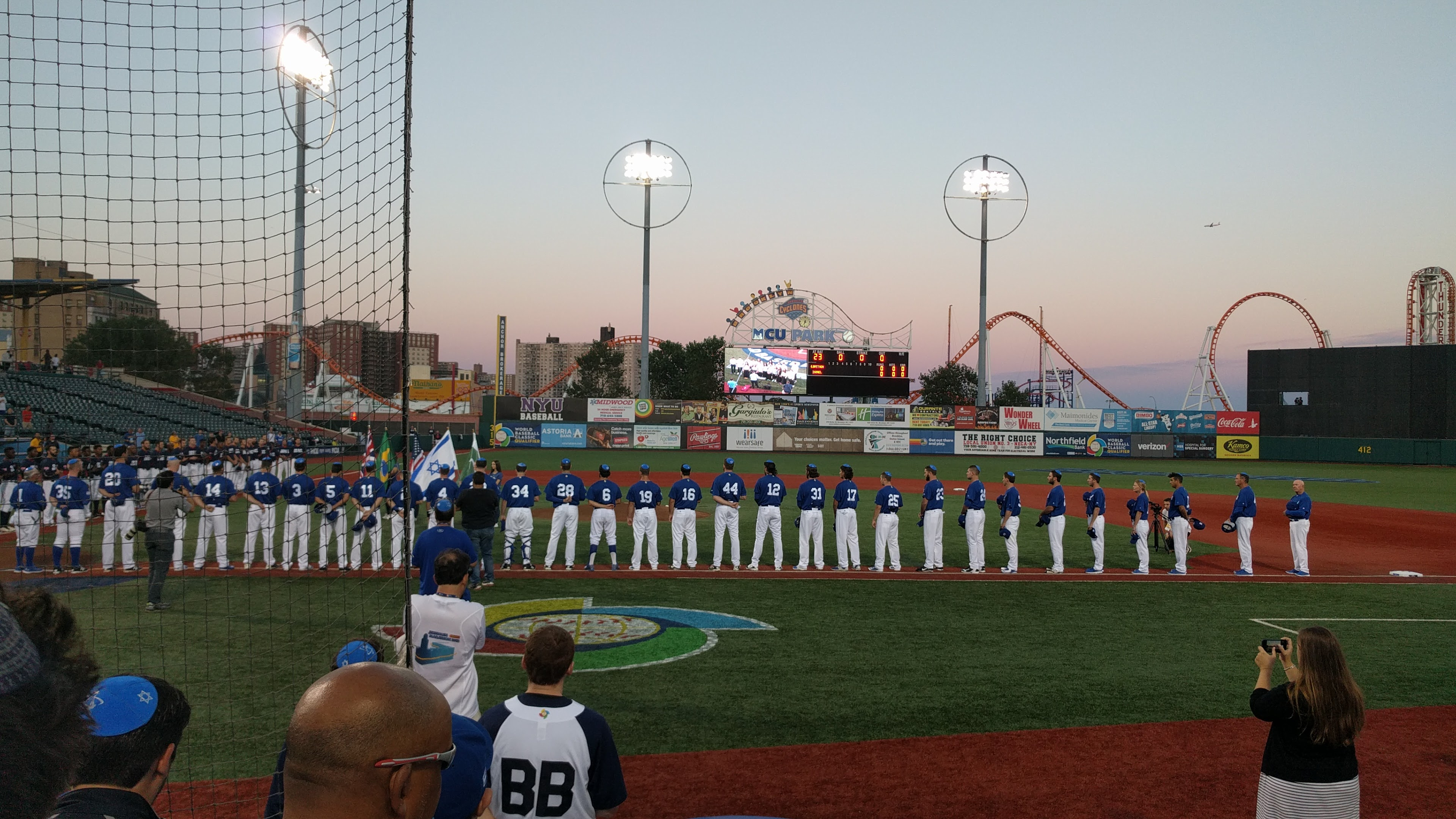
Team Israel wearing their kippot during Hatikvah before the game against Great Britain on September 22, 2016.

In September 2016, Team Israel competed in the 2017 Qualifier 4 round. Colorado Rockies coach Jerry Weinstein served as the manager. Israel's roster included 20 MLB-affiliated minor leaguers, making up 86% of the team, more than any other team in the qualifiers even before including recent Major Leaguers.

Israel won all three of their games in the qualifier, beating Great Britain twice and Brazil once. With the win, Israel advanced to play in Pool A in South Korea in March 2017, against South Korea, Taiwan, and the Netherlands.

Prior to the start of the 2017 tournament, ESPN considered Israel, ranked 41st in the world, to be the biggest underdog in the tournament, referring to them as the "Jamaican bobsled team of the WBC". Israel began the round robin tournament with wins against world # 3 Korea and world # 4 Chinese Taipei, and world # 9 Netherlands. Team Israel's first round performance afforded it a spot in the second round, in Pool E in Japan, and ensured its participation in the 2021 World Baseball Classic tournament. Ryan Lavarnway was named Pool A MVP.

In the first game of the second round, Team Israel beat Team Cuba (world # 5) by a score of 4−1. Israel lost the next two games, to the Netherlands and world # 1 Japan, and came in third in Pool E.

In 2018 a documentary was released entitled Heading Home: The Tale of Team Israel, which covered the experience of Team Israel at the 2017 World Baseball Classic.

==== 2023 World Baseball Classic ====
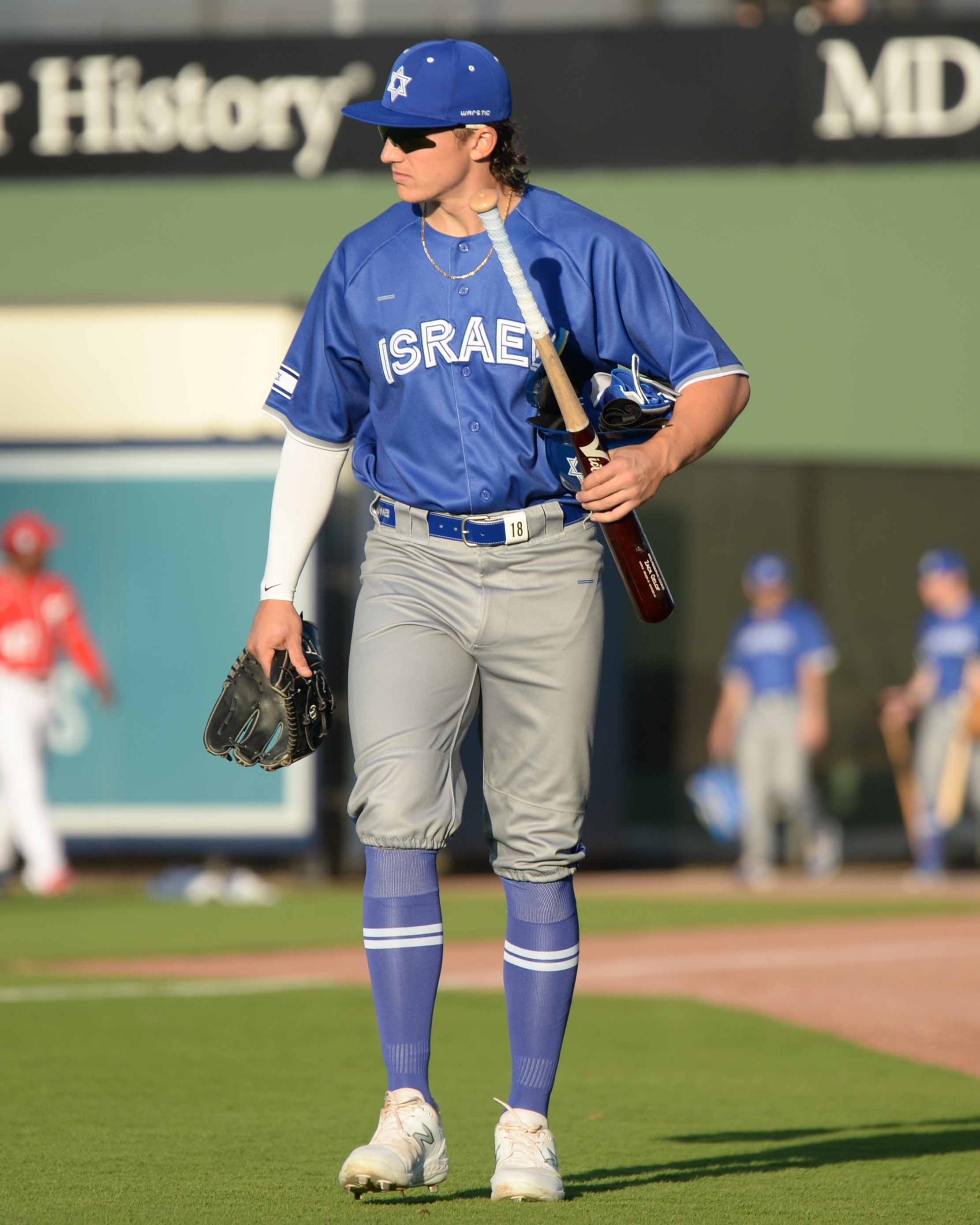
Zack Gelof withTeam Israel

Team Israel competed in the 2023 World Baseball Classic. They played in Miami, Florida. Israel faced Team Puerto Rico, Team Dominican Republic, Team Venezuela, and Team Nicaragua.

American-Israeli Ian Kinsler, a former Major League All Star and two-time Gold Glove winner, and Israeli Olympian, managed the team. Among the players who committed to play for the team were All Star outfielder Joc Pederson, outfielder Alex Dickerson, catcher Garrett Stubbs, and American-Israelis catcher Ryan Lavarnway, infielder Danny Valencia, and infielder Ty Kelly, along with prospects Matt Mervis (who in 2022 led Minor League Baseball in RBIs and was third with 36 home runs), Zack Gelof, Colton Gordon, and Spencer Horwitz. Pitchers on the team included Israeli-American Dean Kremer, Richard Bleier, Robert Stock, Jake Bird, and American-Israelis Jake Fishman, Zack Weiss, and Bubby Rossman, while Scott Effross was slated to be on the team but injured his arm.

Others who it was thought might possibly join Team Israel included All Star pitcher Max Fried, pitcher Noah Davis, pitcher Kenny Rosenberg, and outfielder Mike Moustakas. Third baseman All Star Alex Bregman chose not to play in the WBC, first baseman Rowdy Tellez chose to play for Team Mexico, and Adam Ottavino chose to play for Team Italy. Gold Glove outfielder Harrison Bader, outfielder Kevin Pillar, and pitcher Eli Morgan originally intended to play for the team, but at the end of the day did not play.

Brad Ausmus was one of the team's coaches. He was a former Team Israel manager, had managed in the major leagues for five years, and during his 18-year playing career won three Gold Glove Awards for his defense. Kevin Youkilis was the team's hitting coach. In his 10-year major league career, he won two World Series titles with the Boston Red Sox, was a three-time All Star, and won a Gold Glove Award. Jerry Narron, who in his 30-year career had been as a manager or coach with eight different major league teams and been the third base coach for Team Israel at the 2017 World Baseball Classic qualifier, also served as a coach for the team.

==== 2026 World Baseball Classic ====
Team Israel, ranked No. 19, competed in the 2026 World Baseball Classic from March 6–11, 2026, at LoanDepot Park in Miami in Pool D. It faced Team Venezuela, Team Dominican Republic, Team Netherlands, and Team Nicaragua. Brad Ausmus was the team's manager.

The roster included Israeli-American pitcher Dean Kremer, outfielder and former Gold Glove winner Harrison Bader, catcher Garrett Stubbs, first baseman/second baseman Spencer Horwitz, first baseman Matt Mervis, and pitcher Eli Morgan.

=== European Baseball Championship ===
==== 2019 European Baseball Championship ====
Team Israel won the 2019 European Baseball Championship - B-Pool in early July 2019 in Blagoevgrad, Bulgaria, winning all five of its games. It thus advanced to the playoffs against Team Lithuania in the 2019 Playoff Series at the end of July 2019 for the last qualifying spot for the 2019 European Baseball Championship. Israel won the best-of-three playoff series 2–0, and thereby qualified for the 2019 European Baseball Championship.

In preparation for possible qualification by Israel to play baseball at the 2020 Summer Olympics, 10 American baseball players made aliyah in 2018 in order to qualify under the citizenship requirement for the 2019 European Baseball Championships and the Olympics. The players were Corey Baker, Eric Brodkowitz, Gabe Cramer, Blake Gailen, Alex Katz, Jonathan de Marte, Jon Moscot, Joey Wagman, Zack Weiss, and Jeremy Wolf (who lives in Tel Aviv). They were followed in 2019 by Jeremy Bleich, Ty Kelly, Nick Rickles, Danny Valencia, and Ben Wanger.

In Round 1 of the 2019 European Baseball Championship, Israel went 4–1 (defeating world # 18 the Czech Republic, Sweden, Germany, and Great Britain while losing to the Netherlands). The team thereby advanced to the Championship's eight-team playoffs, with Mitch Glasser leading all Championship batters in runs with 7, and Blake Gailen tied with Germany's Marco Cardoso for the lead in hits, with 8. In the Championship playoffs, Israel defeated Team France in the quarterfinals, lost to Team Italy in the semi-finals, and came in fourth. In the Championship, Joey Wagman led all pitchers with a 0.00 ERA over 10.2 innings.

==== 2021 European Baseball Championship; silver medal ====
At the 2021 European Baseball Championship held September 12–19, 2021, in Turin, Italy, Israel won the silver medal. Third baseman Assaf Lowengart led the Championship with 13 RBIs and tied for the lead in home runs with four, second baseman Mitch Glasser was 5th with an on base percentage of .615, and shortstop Ty Kelly was 5th with seven walks. Joey Wagman led the Championship with 18 strikeouts and tied for the lead with 16 innings pitched, and Ben Wanger tied for the lead with two wins.

=== Olympics ===
Summer Olympics record							Qualification					
Year	Round	Position	W	L	RS	RA	Event	Position	W	L	RS	RA
(Spain) 1992	did not qualify						did not qualify					
(United States) 1996	did not qualify						did not qualify					
(Australia) 2000	did not qualify						did not qualify					
(Greece) 2004	did not qualify						did not qualify					
(China) 2008	did not qualify						did not qualify					
(Japan) 2020	Preliminary	5th	1	4	25	37	Africa/Europe qualifying	1st place, gold medalist(s)	4	1	34	11
Total	1/6		1	4	25	37						

==== 2020 Olympics ====
Because Team Israel finished in the top five in the 2019 European Baseball Championship, it earned the right to participate in the 2020 Olympics qualifiers. That round robin tournament took place in Italy between September 18 and 22, 2019. As the winner of that tournament it qualified to be one of the six national teams that competed at the 2020 Summer Olympics in Tokyo.

The Israeli team started strong at the September 2019 Africa/Europe Qualifying Event, by defeating all three 2019 European Baseball Championship medalists - world # 8 Netherlands, world # 16 Italy, and Spain, before losing to the Czech Republic. In its final game, Israel beat South Africa 11–1 in a game that was stopped in the 7th inning due to the mercy rule. Team Israel won the tournament with a 4–1 record. It thereby qualified to be one of six national baseball teams that competed in the 2020 Summer Olympics in Tokyo. First baseman/DH Danny Valencia batted .375 and led the tournament in runs (7), home runs (3), RBIs (9), walks (5), and slugging percentage (1.000), and starting pitcher Joey Wagman tied for the tournament lead with two wins, and led in complete games (1) and strikeouts (14) as he had an 0.56 ERA in 16 innings.

Every member of the 24-member Team Israel that competed to qualify in the Olympics was Israeli, with four of the players native-born. The others made aliyah to Israel, under Israel's Law of Return, which gives anyone with a Jewish parent, grandparent, or spouse the right to return to Israel and be granted Israeli citizenship. Native-born Israeli team member Shlomo Lipetz observed:

"There is no other country like Israel that carries an identity as it does with Jews around the world. We’re not the only team here with citizens that don't live in the country. There were other teams like Spain that had 22 Venezuelans and two Spaniards. But they didn't have that connection. This wasn't just a group of people, All-Stars who came together. It was people who all had a Bar Mitzvah. We were joking around that everyone will post their Bar Mitzvah photo."

Pos	Team	Pld	W	L	RF	RA	RD	GB	Qualification
1	Israel	5	4	1	34	11	+23	—	Qualification to 2020 Summer Olympics
2	Netherlands	5	4	1	26	15	+11	—	Qualification to Final Qualifying Tournament
3	Czech Republic	5	3	2	26	17	+9	1	
4	Spain	5	2	3	16	19	−3	2	
5	Italy	5	2	3	23	25	−2	2	
6	South Africa	5	0	5	8	46	−38	4	

Source: WBSC

At the 2020 Olympics in Tokyo in the summer of 2021, Israel beat Mexico and finished fifth after going 1-4 and losing to the Dominican Republic 7-6 in the Round 2 Repechage. The Israel national baseball team that competed at the 2020 Summer Olympics was composed mostly of American Jews who were dual American-Israeli citizens, in addition to four Israeli-born players. Danny Valencia tied for the lead in the Olympics with three home runs, tied for second with six runs and seven RBIs, and had the fourth-best slugging percentage (.778), Ryan Lavarnway had the 5th-best slugging percentage (.700), and Mitch Glasser's .474 on base percentage was 5th-best at the Games.

== Past rosters ==
=== 2020 Olympics ===
Baseball at the 2020 Summer Olympics – Israel roster
Players		Coaches
Pitchers: 30 Jeremy Bleich; 21 Jonathan de Marte; 17 Jake Fishman; 47 Alex Katz; 29 Alon Leichman; 12 Shlomo Lipetz; 27 Jon Moscot; 10 D.J. Sharabi; 14 Joey Wagman; 23 Ben Wanger; 44 Zack Weiss; 28 Josh Zeid	Catchers: 7 Tal Erel; 36 Ryan Lavarnway; 9 Nick Rickles; Infielders: 8 Scott Burcham; 11 Ty Kelly; 3 Ian Kinsler; 6 Zach Penprase; 19 Danny Valencia; Outfielders: 2 Blake Gailen; 24 Assaf Lowengart; 4 Robb Paller; 22 Mitch Glasser	Manager: 13 Eric Holtz; Coaches: 15 Nate Fish (third base); 61 Alex Jacobs (bench); 34 Andrew Lorraine (pitching); 56 Nate Mulberg (hitting/first base); 66 Richard Kania (bench)

=== 2017 World Baseball Classic ===
Israel roster – 2017 World Baseball Classic
Players		Coaches
Pitchers: 19 Dylan Axelrod; 38 Corey Baker; 27 Jeremy Bleich; 54 Richard Bleier; 32 Craig Breslow; 41 Danny Burawa; 39 Jake Fishman; 33 Tyler Herron; 35 Jake Kalish; 25 Alex Katz; 4 Kenny Koplove; 17 Dean Kremer; 26 Jared Lakind; 21 Jason Marquis; 44 Troy Neiman; 16 R.C. Orlan; 72 Ryan Sherriff; 46 Zack Thornton; 6 Joey Wagman; 28 Josh Zeid	Catchers: 9 Nick Rickles; 36 Ryan Lavarnway; Infielders: 5 Scott Burcham; 14 Cody Decker; 22 Tyler Krieger; 45 Nate Freiman; 29 Ike Davis; 56 Ty Kelly; Outfielders: 18 Zach Borenstein; 23 Sam Fuld; 2 Blake Gailen; 7 Mike Meyers	Manager: 1 Jerry Weinstein; Coaches: 20 Tom Gamboa (Bench coach); 30 Andrew Lorraine (Pitching coach); 3 Alon Leichman (Bullpen coach); 48 Pat Doyle (3B coach); 10 Nate Fish (1B coach); Tal Erel (Bullpen catcher); Justine Siegal (Mental skills coach); Ben Werthan (Advance scouting coordinator)

== International tournament results ==
=== World Baseball Classic ===
World Baseball Classic record							Qualification record			
Year	Round	Position	W	L	RS	RA	W	L	RS	RA
2006	did not enter						No qualifiers held			
2009	did not enter						No qualifiers held			
2013	did not qualify						2	1	18	14
(South Korea) (Japan) 2017	Round 2	6th	4	2	30	31	3	0	15	3
(United States) 2023	Round 1	14th	1	3	4	26	Automatically qualified			
(United States) 2026	Round 1	12th	2	2	15	23	Automatically qualified			
Total	Round 2	3/6	7	7	49	80	5	1	33	17

== European Baseball Championship Record ==
	European Baseball Championship record							Qualification record				
Year	Host(s)	Round	Position	W	L	RS	RA	Host	W	L	RS	RA
2010	Did not qualify							Croatia	2	2	22	27
2012	Did not qualify							Israel	3	2	39	16
2014	Did not enter							Did not enter				
2016	Did not qualify							Slovenia, Austria	8	2	97	29
2019	Germany	Semifinals	4th	5	3	50	48	Serbia, Bulgaria, Lithuania	11	3	129	48
2021	Italy	Final	2nd place, silver medalist(s)	5	1	41	21					
2023	Czech Republic	Quarter-Finals	6th	3	3	34	32					
2025	Netherlands	Quarter-Finals	7th	3	4	33	38					

=== Other competitions ===
European Under-21 Baseball Championship

- 2006 : 9th
- 2016 : 4th (host nation)

European Juveniles Baseball Championship

- 2006 : 3rd
- 2007 : 7th
- 2012 : 4th

European Junior Baseball Championship

== See also ==
- Baseball in Israel
- Israel Baseball League
- Sports in Israel
