= Alex Katz (baseball) =

American-Israeli baseball player (born 1994)

Alexander Katz
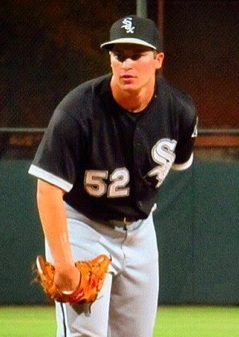
- Katz pitching in July 2015

Staten Island FerryHawks – No. 12
- Pitcher
- Born: October 12, 1994 (age 31); Manhasset, New York, U.S.
- Bats: Left Throws: Left
- Stats at Baseball Reference

Alexander Benjamin Katz (Hebrew: אלכס כץ; born October 12, 1994) is an American-Israeli professional baseball left-handed pitcher for the Staten Island FerryHawks of Atlantic League of Professional Baseball. He plays internationally for Team Israel.

Katz pitched for the St. John's Red Storm, and was part of the team that won the 2015 Big East Conference Regular Season and Tournament. He was drafted by the Chicago White Sox in the 27th Round of the 2015 Major League Baseball draft.

In 2015 and 2016 combined, pitching in the Rookie Pioneer League and Arizona League, the Single–A South Atlantic League, and the High–A Carolina League, he was 0–3 with a 2.87 ERA and 6 saves. In 87 2/3 innings, he struck out 97 batters.

Katz pitched for Team Israel at the 2017 World Baseball Classic. He made four relief appearances and pitched a total of 3 1/3 scoreless innings. In May 2017, Katz was traded to the Baltimore Orioles for two international pool spots. In October 2018, he became a dual Israeli citizen. He pitched for the Israel national baseball team at the 2020 Summer Olympics in Tokyo in the summer of 2021. He also pitched for Team Israel in the 2023 World Baseball Classic.

== Early life ==
Katz was born in Manhasset, New York, to Gary and Adrienne Katz. He has two older sisters, Anna and Natalie.

== High school ==
Katz went to Herricks High School (Class of 2012) in New Hyde Park, New York, where he pitched and played first base and outfield. He threw a 84 mph fastball. He was an All-League selection as a junior, and named All-County, Second Team All-Long Island, 2012 honorable mention Rawlings/Perfect Game Preseason All-America, Perfect Game first team All-Northeast Region, MVP of the Nassau County Exceptional Senior Game, and won the Best Pitcher Award for the RTC Grand Slam Challenge (Long Island All-Star Game).

== College ==
Katz then pitched for the St. John's Red Storm, attending the school on a baseball and academic scholarship, while majoring in sports management and minoring in business. As a freshman, Katz made 22 appearances, including two starts, and went 1–3 with one save and a 5.33 ERA. During the summer of 2013, Katz pitched in the Hamptons Collegiate Baseball League for the Shelter Island Bucks and in the Cape Cod Baseball League (CCBL) for the Yarmouth-Dennis Red Sox. Baseball America named Katz the top pitching prospect in the Hamptons Collegiate Baseball League for that season, and Perfect Game named him the Hamptons pitcher with the best breaking ball.

As a sophomore, Katz appeared in 16 games, including nine starts, and went 1–2 with a 3.86 ERA and 39 strikeouts in 42.0 innings of work. On April 2, 2014, Katz started and struck out five in 6.0 scoreless innings of no-hit ball to earn the win as part of a combined one-hit shutout at Wagner. In the summer of 2014, Katz returned to the CCBL, playing for the Chatham Anglers.

As a junior, Katz appeared in 19 games, including 6 starts, and went 3–1 with a 3.40 ERA and 52 strikeouts in 55.2 innings of work. He threw mostly a fastball, a changeup, and a slider. In March 2015, Katz was named the Big East Conference Pitcher of the Week after striking out 13 batters in 7.0 scoreless innings in a pair of appearances that helped St. John's post consecutive shutouts in a two-game week. Katz, who made one start and one relief appearance, had a career-high 13 strikeouts in 6.0 scoreless frames to earn the win in a start against Fairfield. Katz then added 1.0 shutout inning against Central Connecticut. The lefty surrendered just one hit in his two appearances to limit the opposition to a .048 batting average (1-for-21). Katz was part of the St. John's Red Storm baseball team that won the 2015 Big East Conference Regular Season and Tournament.

== Professional career ==
=== Chicago White Sox ===
Katz was drafted by the Chicago White Sox in the 27th round of the 2015 Major League Baseball draft.

In 2015, at the age of 20, he pitched for the Great Falls Voyagers of the Rookie Pioneer League, and for the Arizona League White Sox of the Rookie Arizona League. He was a combined 0–2 with a 2.20 ERA and 4 saves, as in 32 2/3 innings he struck out 40 batters.

In 2016, he pitched for the Kannapolis Intimidators of the Single–A South Atlantic League, and the Winston-Salem Dash of the High–A Carolina League. He was a combined 0–1 with a 3.27 ERA and 2 saves, and in 55 innings he struck out 57.

=== Baltimore Orioles ===
On May 20, 2017, the White Sox traded Katz to the Baltimore Orioles in exchange for two international pool signing bonus spots valued at over $750,000. Orioles Executive Vice President Dan Duquette said of Katz:

He has a good fastball and excellent strikeout record. A lot of guys like him and they project him to be a major league reliever. We’re going to send him to Frederick.... He showed a good fastball and a really good breaking ball in the [World Baseball Classic]. We got a couple good looks at him.

At the time of the trade, Katz had struck out 10.1 batters per 9 innings in his 62-game, 102-inning minor league career. In 2017, pitching for the Kannapolis Intimidators before he was traded, he was 0–1 with a 4.40 ERA, and pitching for the Frederick Keys of the High–A Carolina League after the trade he was 3–2 with a 5.57 ERA.

Katz pitched in the 2018 season for the Delmarva Shorebirds of the Single–A South Atlantic League, for whom he was 3–2 with a 4.26 ERA in 25 games, and for Frederick for whom he was 0–0 with a 4.50 ERA in 5 games. Katz was released by the Orioles’ Single-A affiliate, the Frederick Keys, on October 18, 2018.

=== Long Island Ducks ===
In late 2018, Katz signed a minor league deal to return to the Chicago White Sox organization, but was released during spring training in March 2019.

On April 15, 2019, Katz was signed as a spring training invitee for the Long Island Ducks of the Atlantic League of Professional Baseball. In 2019, he logged a 4.70 ERA over 15 1/3 innings for the Ducks. He became a free agent following the season.

=== Kansas City Royals ===
On February 12, 2020, Katz signed a minor league deal with the Kansas City Royals. Katz did not play in a game in 2020 due to the cancellation of the minor league season because of the COVID-19 pandemic. Katz was released by the Royals organization on November 12.

=== Chicago Cubs ===
On May 4, 2021, Katz signed a minor league deal with the Chicago Cubs. He was assigned to the Myrtle Beach Pelicans of the Low-A East, later receiving promotions to the South Bend Cubs of the High-A Central and the Tennessee Smokies of the Double-A South. In 20 appearances between the three affiliates, Katz posted a cumulative 6.51 ERA with 44 strikeouts in 47 innings pitched. He elected minor league free agency following the season on November 7.

=== Staten Island FerryHawks ===
On April 18, 2022, Katz signed with the Long Island Ducks of the Atlantic League of Professional Baseball. However, he was released prior to the start of the season on April 22.

On May 3, 2022, Katz signed with the Staten Island FerryHawks of the Atlantic League of Professional Baseball. He was 1–1 with a 4.50 ERA in 23 relief appearances covering 24 innings in which he gave up 15 hits and struck out 31 batters (11.6 strikeouts per 9 innings). He became a free agent following the season.

On April 22, 2023, Katz re-signed with the FerryHawks for the 2023 season. During the season, he was 1–2 with a 7.76 ERA in 26 2/3 innings in which he struck out 30 batters (10.1 strikeouts per 9 innings).

=== Southern Maryland Blue Crabs ===
On March 11, 2024, Katz signed with the Southern Maryland Blue Crabs of the Atlantic League of Professional Baseball. In 8 games for the club, Katz posted a 5.19 ERA with 8 strikeouts across 8 2/3 innings of work.

=== Hagerstown Flying Boxcars ===
On May 31, 2024, Katz was traded to the Hagerstown Flying Boxcars of the Atlantic League of Professional Baseball in exchange for Jaylyn Williams. In 14 games for Hagerstown, he struggled to a 6.50 ERA with 19 strikeouts across 18 innings of work. Katz was released by the Boxcars on July 11.

=== Long Island Ducks (second stint) ===
On July 12, 2024, Katz signed with the Long Island Ducks of the Atlantic League of Professional Baseball. He made one appearance for the Ducks, allowing four runs on four walks with one strikeout in 1/3 of an inning. Katz was released by Long Island on July 16.

=== Lexington Legends ===
On August 10, 2024, Katz signed with the Lexington Legends of the Atlantic League of Professional Baseball. Katz was released by Lexington on August 15, after two appearances in which he did not record an out and allowed a total of three runs.

=== York Revolution ===
On July 5, 2025, Katz signed with the York Revolution of the Atlantic League of Professional Baseball. In three appearances for York, he struggled to a 16.88 ERA with seven strikeouts across 2 2/3 innings pitched. Katz was released by the Revolution on July 12.

=== Arabia Wolves ===
In October 2025, Katz signed with the Arabia Wolves of Baseball United.

=== Staten Island FerryHawks (second stint) ===
On April 18, 2026, Katz signed with the Staten Island FerryHawks of the Atlantic League of Professional Baseball.

== Team Israel; World Baseball Classic and Olympics ==
Katz was on the roster for Israel at the 2017 World Baseball Classic qualifier, but did not make an appearance during the tournament. Team Israel beat Pakistan, Great Britain, and Brazil, all of which were better ranked.

Katz pitched for Team Israel at the 2017 World Baseball Classic, in March 2017. He pitched in 4 games, pitching 3.1 scoreless innings.

In October 2018 he became a dual Israeli citizen, partly to help Israel's baseball team make the 2020 Olympics.

He pitched for the Israel national baseball team in two relief appearances at the 2020 Summer Olympics in Tokyo in the summer of 2021. He played for Team Israel in the 2023 World Baseball Classic. He played for Team Israel manager and former All-Star Ian Kinsler, and alongside All-Star outfielder Joc Pederson and pitcher Dean Kremer, among others.

Katz pitched for Team Israel in the 2023 European Baseball Championship in September 2023 in the Czech Republic.

== Business venture; Stadium Custom Kicks ==
Katz, who describes himself as "a big sneakerhead," started a company named Stadium Custom Kicks ("SCK"), which customizes baseball cleats. He began by watching online videos to learn how to paint sneakers, and then purchased paint and developed a design. When he first began customizing cleats, the first pair he customized was for himself for the 2017 World Baseball Classic. Rob Refsnyder, a New York Yankee at the time, saw the design on an Instagram account, and direct-messaged Katz, asking: "Hey, can my friend Aaron and I send in a bunch of cleats?” Refsnyder and a rookie outfielder named Aaron Judge thus became his first major league clients. The company was officially born in August 2019, after Major League Baseball ended its insistence on uniformity in 2018, which had been reflected in its Collective Bargaining Agreement's Footwear Supplier Regulations “51 percent rule,” which required that players’ cleats mainly display their team's primary colors. During the 2019 Players Weekend, more than 100 players wore the brand's custom cleats.

Among the company's clients, which include athletes and celebrities, in addition to Aaron Judge are Fernando Tatis Jr., Joc Pederson, Jose Altuve, Byron Buxton, Robinson Cano, Tony Gonsolin, Kyle Schwarber, Rafael Devers, William Contreras, Jacob deGrom, Edwin Díaz, Marcelo Mayer, Robbie Ray, and a few hundred major leaguers and minor leaguers; 450 of them in the major leagues. Some individual Major League Baseball players have ordered 20 to 30 pairs of cleats in a single season. While two thirds of his custom projects are baseball cleats, football and golf are close behind. In 2022, the company produced approximately 3,000 pairs of cleats, which were sold for $300 to $600 per pair. As of 2023, 43 people work for the company, including 30 artists. A player works with a designer, and the shoe model a player chooses is sent to one of the artists, who use Jacquard Airbrush Color, which is available in 57 colors and can be mixed to create more.

== See also ==
- List of select Jewish baseball players
