= Bubby Rossman =

American baseball player (born 1992)

Free agent
- Pitcher
- Born: June 29, 1992 (age 34); La Habra, California, U.S.
- Bats: Both Throws: Right

MLB debut
- July 13, 2022, for the Philadelphia Phillies

MLB statistics (through 2022 season)
- Win–loss record: 0–0
- Earned run average: 18.00
- Strikeouts: 1
- Stats at Baseball Reference

Teams
- Philadelphia Phillies (2022)
Medals
Men's baseball
Representing Israel
European Baseball Championship
| Silver medal – second place | 2021 Turin | Team |

Charles Irvin "Bubby" Rossman (born June 29, 1992) is an American-Israeli professional baseball pitcher who is a free agent. He played college baseball for Cerritos College and California State University, Dominguez Hills. He was selected in the 22nd round of the 2014 Major League Baseball draft by the Los Angeles Dodgers. He made his MLB debut at 30 years of age with the Philadelphia Phillies in 2022. He pitched for the Israeli national baseball team in the 2023 World Baseball Classic.

== Early life ==
Rossman was born in La Habra, California, to Charles (an actor) and Denyce Rossman, has a younger brother (Spencer), and is Jewish. He attended La Habra High School ('10), where he played baseball (batting .452 as a junior), football, and soccer (as the starting goalkeeper).

== College ==
He then attended Cerritos College in California, where Rossman played baseball and as a freshman was named a 2nd team All Star. In his two seasons at Cerritos, while playing the outfield he batted .307/.446/.432 his freshman year, and .341/.459/.549 his sophomore year.

Rossman transferred, and next double-majored in business and kinesiology while attending NCAA Division II California State University, Dominguez Hills. Playing in 2014 in his senior season for the baseball team primarily in right field and as a designated hitter, he batted .261/.383/.455 while switch-hitting, and won a Division II West Region Rawlings Gold Glove Award in right field where he had 7 assists and played error-less defense; Kevin Pillar was a prior winner of the award for the school. He also pitched 8.1 innings when the team ran low on pitchers, sporting a 92 mph fastball.

== Professional career ==
=== Los Angeles Dodgers ===
Rossman was selected in the 22nd round of the 2014 Major League Baseball draft by the Los Angeles Dodgers, as a pitcher. While he "definitely did not want to be a pitcher ... I wanted to be an outfielder in the big leagues," and several teams were interested in him as an outfielder, the Dodgers insisted that he transition to pitcher. In 2014 as a relief pitcher for the rookie-level Arizona League Dodgers, he was 0-2 with one save and a 4.74 ERA in 19 innings, with 23 strikeouts. In 2015 with the Single-A Great Lakes Loons he was 3-1 with 4 saves and a 2.26 ERA in 51 2/3 innings over 29 games, in which he had 54 strikeouts. In 2016 pitching all but one inning for the High-A Rancho Cucamonga Quakes, he was 4-0 with a 3.43 ERA in 39 1/3 innings over 23 games, in which he had 34 strikeouts.

Rossman was slow to recover from a triceps injury, which impeded his velocity. He was released by the Dodgers organization on August 30, 2016.

=== Sioux City Explorers ===
On June 18, 2017, Rossman signed with the Sioux City Explorers of the American Association of Professional Baseball. He made 20 appearances for the team, posting an 0-2 record and 4.54 ERA with 30 strikeouts and 1 save in 35 2/3 innings pitched. On February 5, 2018, Rossman was released.

=== Cleburne Railroaders ===
On April 1, 2019, after not playing in the 2018 season, Rossman signed with the Cleburne Railroaders of the American Association of Professional Baseball. Pitching in 6 games for Cleburne, he posted a 1-0 record and 5.40 ERA with 10 strikeouts in 6 2/3 innings pitched. Rossman was released on June 11.

=== Trois-Rivières Aigles ===
Rossman spent the remainder of the 2019 season with the Trois-Rivières Aigles of the Canadian-American Association. In 29 appearances, he registered a 3-0 record and 2.41 ERA with 48 strikeouts in 33 2/3 innings of work. During the season, Rossman also became vegan.

Following the 2019 season, the Can-Am Association announced it would be merging with the Frontier League for the 2020 season, but play was delayed until 2021 due to the COVID-19 pandemic. Rossman would spend 2020 with the Nerds Herd in the City of Champions Cup league, logging a 3.60 ERA with 23 strikeouts in 15 appearances.

=== York Revolution ===
On May 3, 2021, Rossman signed with the Bravos de León of the Mexican League. However, he left the team without making an appearance and signed with the York Revolution of the Atlantic League of Professional Baseball on May 27. In 36 games for York, Rossman worked to a 4-3 record and 5.40 ERA with 48 strikeouts in 33 1/3 innings pitched.

=== Philadelphia Phillies ===
On November 9, 2021, Rossman signed a minor league contract with the Philadelphia Phillies organization, at which point he was throwing his fastball in the high 90s, and touching 99 mph, along with an 88 mph slider. He was assigned to the Double-A Reading Fightin Phils at the beginning of the season, and before he was called up he pitched in 27 games (including 8 starts; the first of his professional career), with a 3.32 ERA in 40 2/3 innings in which he struck out 48 batters.

Rossman was promoted to the major leagues for the first time on July 13, 2022. He made his MLB debut that day, at 30 years of age, after five years out of affiliated minor league baseball. Pitching the 8th inning that evening against the Toronto Blue Jays, he first walked a batter and gave up a home run to Teoscar Hernandez. He then retired the next three batters on only nine pitches, however, including a 98 mph four-seam fastball to strike out Matt Chapman. After the game, he was sent back to Double–A Reading. In 2022 with Reading, Rossman was 2-2 with one save and a 3.02 ERA in 29 games (9 starts) in which he pitched 44 2/3 innings and allowed 29 hits while striking out 56 batters. With the Triple–A Lehigh Valley IronPigs he was 3–3 with a 6.04 ERA in 15 games (5 starts) in which he pitched 25 1/3 innings and struck out 27 batters. While he had pitched in only one game for the Phillies, he was awarded a National League Champions ring. He elected free agency following the season on November 10.

=== New York Mets ===
On March 22, 2023, Rossman signed a minor league contract with the New York Mets organization. He was assigned to the Triple-A Syracuse Mets to begin the season. In 18 games for Syracuse, he struggled to an 8.18 ERA with 20 strikeouts in 22 innings of work.

=== Kansas City Monarchs ===
On July 29, 2023, Rossman signed with the Kansas City Monarchs of the American Association of Professional Baseball. For the season, he was 1-0 with one save and a 1.04 ERA, as in 8 2/3 innings he struck out 16 batters. Rossman became a free agent at the end of the 2023 season.

=== Rieleros de Aguascalientes ===
On June 21, 2024, Rossman signed with the Rieleros de Aguascalientes of the Mexican League. He made 14 appearances for Aguascalientes, recording a 3.07 ERA with 10 strikeouts and 2 saves across 14 2/3 innings of work.

Rossman made 5 appearances for Aguascalientes in 2025, but struggled to a 14.73 ERA with 4 strikeouts across 6 1/3 innings pitched.

=== Olmecas de Tabasco ===
On May 2, 2025, Rossman was traded to the Olmecas de Tabasco of the Mexican League in exchange for Kevin Melean. In four appearances for Tabasco, he recorded a 2.45 ERA with five strikeouts across 3 2/3 innings pitched. Rossman was released by the Olmecas on May 14.

== Team Israel ==
In 2021 Rossman played internationally, representing the Israel national baseball team in the 2021 European Baseball Championship, debuting with a win against Team Russia. He helped the team win a silver medal.

Rossman played for Team Israel in the 2023 World Baseball Classic, which took place in loanDepot park in Miami. He played for Team Israel manager Ian Kinsler, and alongside two-time All Star outfielder Joc Pederson, starting pitcher Dean Kremer, and others.

Rossman pitched for Team Israel in the 2023 European Baseball Championship in September 2023 in the Czech Republic, and was 0-0 with one save and a 0.00 ERA in which he held batters hitless with seven strikeouts over four innings across two games.

== See also ==
- List of Jewish Major League Baseball players
