= Ben Wanger =

American-Israeli baseball player

- Pitcher
- Born: April 7, 1997 (age 29); Newton, Massachusetts, U.S.
- Bats: Right Throws: Right
Medals
Men's baseball
Representing Israel
European Baseball Championship
Silver medal – second place	2021 Israel	Team

Ben Wanger (Hebrew: בן וונגר; born April 7, 1997) is an American-Israeli former professional baseball pitcher. He also plays for Team Israel. Playing for the Yale Bulldogs he led the Ivy League in RBI in 2017 and was First-Team All-Ivy, and led the League in ERA in 2018 and was First-Team All-Ivy as a relief pitcher. He pitched and played first base for Team Israel at the 2020 Summer Olympics in Tokyo in the summer of 2021.

== Early life and education ==
Wanger was born in Newton, Massachusetts, on April 7, 1997. He is Jewish. His parents are David Wanger (who played baseball at Harvard University) and Gwen Kane-Wanger (who played field hockey and lacrosse at Brown University). Some of his family, including his grandmother, are Holocaust survivors. He now lives in Coral Gables, Florida.

=== High school ===
Wanger attended Belmont Hill School in Belmont, Massachusetts, where he played for the school's baseball team. In his senior season, as a pitcher he had a 0.73 ERA in 48 innings, and pitched the first perfect game in school history. He was All-Independent School League in 2013, 2014, and 2015, and in 2015 was also the Independent School League MVP, Prep Baseball Report All-Massachusetts first team, and Boston Globe Prep All-Scholastic. He also played football (as a defensive end) and basketball (as a forward) for the school.

=== College ===
Wanger first attended Yale University, where he graduated in 2019 with a degree in economics and environmental engineering. Playing for the Yale Bulldogs, he was primarily a first baseman and a pitcher. In his sophomore year in 2017 he batted .317/.415/.610(4th in the Ivy League) with 8 home runs (4th) and led the League with 48 RBIs. He was named 2017 American Baseball Coaches Association/Rawlings NCAA Division I Northeast All-Region First Team, New England Intercollegiate Baseball Association (NEIBA) Division I All-New England First Team, a unanimous All-Ivy First Team selection, and a first-team All-American (D-I) by the Jewish Sports Review. In 2018, on the mound, he was 2-0 with six saves (2nd in the league) and an 0.90 ERA (leading the league), as in 30 innings over 16 games he gave up 21 hits and struck out 32 batters. He was named All-Ivy First Team as a relief pitcher, All-Ivy Second Team as a first baseman, and 2018 NEIBA Division I All-New England Third Team. After the 2018 season, he played collegiate summer baseball for the Chatham Anglers of the Cape Cod Baseball League. Wanger suffered a serious hamstring injury in the fourth game of his senior season in 2019, which caused him to have season-ending surgery and redshirt.

In 2019-20 he attended the University of Southern California, where he was a graduate student in the Marshall School of Business studying for a Master in Science in Entrepreneurship and Innovation while hoping to work in the renewable energy sector. During the pandemic-shortened season in 2020 Wanger batted .410 (5th in the Pac-12)/.500/.564, and was also the USC Trojans’ closer, and had three saves (2nd) and a 0.00 ERA in six appearances. He was named Collegiate Baseball Newspaper All-America second-team.

Wanger then attended the University of Miami as a graduate student at the Herbert Business School, earning a Master of Science in international business. He pitched in relief for the Miami Hurricanes in 2021. Prior to the season, Collegiate Baseball Newspaper named him a preseason Second-Team All-American. In March 2021 he had minor surgery to remove bone chips from his elbow, and he was back on the mound two months later.

== Professional career ==
In 2021, Wanger pitched for the Lancaster Barnstormers of the independent Atlantic League of Professional Baseball. He made 15 appearances for the team, posting a 5.67 ERA with 31 strikeouts in 27 innings pitched. He became a free agent following the season.

On March 9, 2022, Wanger re-signed with the Barnstormers for the 2022 season. Wanger appeared in only two relief appearances and pitched only 2 2/3 innings for the Barnstormers, with 2 strikeouts and giving up six hits and five runs. With Lancaster, he won the Atlantic League championship.

== Post-playing career ==
On February 20, 2023, Wanger joined the Los Angeles 2028 Organizing Committee as part of its fellowship program for retired Olympians and Paralympians.

== Team Israel ==
In August 2019, he obtained Israeli citizenship so that he could play for Team Israel in baseball at the 2020 Summer Olympics in Tokyo.

He pitched for Team Israel at the 2019 European Baseball Championship. He also pitched for the team at the Africa/Europe 2020 Olympic Qualification tournament in Italy in September 2019, which Israel won to qualify to play baseball at the 2020 Summer Olympics in Tokyo. He had three hits, scored four runs, and had three RBIs, while on the mound he pitched 4.1 scoreless innings, gave up one hit and one walk, and struck out five batters.

He pitched for Team Israel at the 2020 Summer Olympics in Tokyo in the summer of 2021, giving up a run in two innings over two relief appearances, and also played first base in one game.

Wanger played first base, pitcher, and DH, and batted .273/.304/.409 for Team Israel in the 2023 European Baseball Championship in September 2023 in the Czech Republic.
