= Colton Gordon =

American baseball player (born 1998)

- Gordon throwing a pitch for the Brewers

Milwaukee Brewers – No. 36
- Pitcher
- Born: December 20, 1998 (age 27); Saint Petersburg, Florida, U.S.
- Bats: Left Throws: Left

MLB debut
- May 14, 2025, for the Houston Astros

MLB statistics (through 2026 season)
- Win–loss record: 6–5
- Earned run average: 5.83
- Strikeouts: 84
- Stats at Baseball Reference

Teams
- Houston Astros (2025–2026); Milwaukee Brewers (2026–present)

Colton Zimring Gordon (born December 20, 1998) is an American professional baseball pitcher for the Milwaukee Brewers of Major League Baseball (MLB). Gordon played college baseball at Hillsborough Community College and the University of Central Florida (UCF). He was selected by the Houston Astros in the eighth round of the 2021 MLB draft, and made his MLB debut in 2025. He pitched for Team Israel in the 2023 World Baseball Classic.

== Early life ==
Gordon was born in St. Petersburg, Florida, where his father Steve Gordon lives. He is Jewish, and attended Hebrew school and had his bar mitzvah. He grew up playing T-ball and Little League at Fossil Park in St. Petersburg. He also grew up in Bradenton, Florida, with his mother, and went to Haile Middle School. Gordon was a fan of the Tampa Bay Rays growing up.

== High school and college ==
Gordon attended and played baseball at Lakewood Ranch High School in Bradenton. In his senior year he had a 4–2 win–loss record with a 1.21 earned run average (ERA) with 77 strikeouts in 52 innings pitched. He was ranked the No 6 left-handed pitcher in Florida coming out of high school.

In the summers of 2018 and 2019, Gordon played collegiate summer baseball with the Kenosha Kingfish of the Northwoods League.

Gordon played college baseball first at Hillsborough Community College in 2019 (7–4 with a 2.44 ERA), and attended but did not play baseball as he redshirted at the University of Florida. Gordon then enrolled at the University of Central Florida (UCF), where he played for the UCF Knights. In 2020, he was 2–0 with a 2.35 ERA. In 2021 he was 5–2 with a 2.77 ERA and 72 strikeouts in 55 1/3 innings, with a strikeout/walk ratio of 5.54, which was fourth-best in the American Athletic Conference (AAC).

Gordon underwent Tommy John surgery in May 2021 during his senior year at UCF, and was named Second Team All-AAC and to the AAC's All-Academic Team despite missing half the season. Despite the injury and surgery two months prior, he was drafted by the Houston Astros in the eighth round of the 2021 Major League Baseball draft, and signed for a signing bonus of $127,500.

== Professional career ==
=== Houston Astros ===
==== 2022-24 ====
Gordon returned from the injury in 2022 to play for the rookie–level Florida Complex League Astros, Single–A Fayetteville Woodpeckers, and High–A Asheville Tourists. He was a combined 2–1 with a 2.35 ERA, a WHIP of 0.787, .182 average-against, and a strikeout/walk ratio of 9.75 (second-best in the minor leagues). After the season, he pitched in the Arizona Fall League for the Surprise Saguaros. He was named a 2022 MiLB.com Organization All-Star. Astros pitching coach Bill Murphy said "[Gordon] had a fantastic year last year.... The sky's the limit for him."

In March 2023, MiLB.com named Gordon the "emergent star" of the American League West, and he was the Astro's # 10 prospect according to MLB.com. His four-seam fastball from a low release point was generally 89–92 mph and could reach 94 mph, and he also threw a mid-70s curveball, a 78–82 mph slider, a low-80s sinking changeup, and a cutter. Gordon began 2023 with the Double–A Corpus Christi Hooks, and was later promoted to the Triple-A Sugar Land Space Cowboys. In 29 appearances (24 starts) split between the two affiliates, he compiled a 7–7 record and 4.14 ERA with 151 strikeouts across 128 1/3 innings pitched. He was named a 2023 MiLB.com Organization All-Star.

Gordon spent 2024 with the Triple–A Sugar Land Space Cowboys, making 25 appearances (24 starts) and compiling an 8–2 record and 3.94 ERA with 124 strikeouts (4th in the PCL) across 123 1/3 innings pitched. He led the league among qualified pitchers in batting average against (.238) and WHIP (1.22), and his team went 21–4 in games he started. He was twice named PCL Pitcher of the Week, and was named a PCL All Star. On November 19, 2024, the Astros added Gordon to their 40-man roster to protect him from the Rule 5 draft.

==== 2025 ====
Gordon was optioned to Triple-A Sugar Land to begin the 2025 season. In eight starts for Sugar Land, he was 4–0 with a 2.55 ERA and 43 strikeouts and eight walks across 42 1/3 innings pitched.

On May 14, 2025, Gordon was promoted to the major leagues for the first time. He made his MLB debut that evening as the starting pitcher at Daikin Park versus the Kansas City Royals. Gordon logged 4 1/3 innings and ceded 3 runs; the Astros won 4–3 and he received a no decision. On June 6, he earned his first major league win with by tossing five innings versus the Cleveland Guardians, surrendering one run on seven hits, and striking out five to set up an Astros' 4–2 win at Progressive Field.

==== 2026 ====
Gordon was again optioned to Triple-A Sugar Land to begin the 2026 season. He was named the Pacific Coast League Pitcher of the Week three times for Sugar Land in 2026. Pitching for Sugar Land in 2026 he was 6-3 with a 3.69 ERA, as in 14 game (13 starts, one complete game) he threw 70.2 innings in which he had a WHIP of 1.175 as he walked 1.8 batters per 9 innings.

=== Milwaukee Brewers ===
On July 15, 2026, the Astros traded Gordon, Lance McCullers Jr., and cash to the Milwaukee Brewers for Jadyn Fielder. Gordon pitched one game for the Brewers, in which he was 0-1 with a 3.60 ERA over 5 innings.

== International career; Team Israel ==
Gordon is Jewish. In 2023, he pitched for the Israel national baseball team in the 2023 World Baseball Classic.

== See also ==
- List of baseball players who underwent Tommy John surgery
- List of select Jewish baseball players
