= Kenny Koplove =

American baseball player (born 1993)

- Pitcher
- Born: August 2, 1993 (age 32); Philadelphia, Pennsylvania, U.S.
- Bats: Right Throws: Right
- Stats at Baseball Reference

Kenneth Scott Koplove (born August 2, 1993) is an American right-handed former professional baseball pitcher. He played internationally with the Israel national baseball team.

In high school, as a senior Koplove was named the 2012 Gatorade Pennsylvania Player of the Year. As a junior at Duke University in 2015, he struck out 37 batters in 25.1 innings, while setting the school's single-season record with 11 saves. He was selected in the 17th round of the 2015 Major League Baseball draft by the Philadelphia Phillies. Koplove was on the roster of Team Israel at the 2017 World Baseball Classic.

== Early life ==
Koplove was born in Philadelphia, Pennsylvania, and grew up in South Philadelphia. He is the son of Steve (an attorney) and Joni Koplove, and is Jewish. He is the younger brother of former major league pitcher Mike Koplove, who is 17 years older. He also has two older sisters; named Andrea and Erica.

== Amateur career ==
=== High school ===
Koplove played high school baseball for William Penn Charter School. He was named 2009 Southeastern Pennsylvania Rookie of the Year by the Philadelphia Inquirer, and the Inter-Academic League (Inter-Ac High School League) Most Valuable Player. He was then named the 2011 Southeastern Pennsylvania Top Junior Pitcher by the Pennsylvania Inquirer.

As a senior in 2012, Koplove was 9–1 with a 2.06 ERA, and 80 strikeouts in 48 innings, and batted .347, and was named the 2012 Gatorade/ESPN Pennsylvania Player of the Year, as well as 2012 Rawlings Baseball First Team All-Atlantic Region. He was three-time First-Team All-State and First-Team All Inter-Ac League. His fastball reached 94 miles per hour.

=== College ===
Koplove played shortstop and pitched in college for Duke University for the Blue Devils. As a freshman in 2013, he started 45 games at shortstop, and pitched in three games. He played for the Chatham Anglers of the Cape Cod League over the summer, batting .296 and making one relief appearance. As a sophomore in 2014 he started 55 games at shortstop. As a junior in 2015 he was the team's starting shortstop, starting 43 games, and primary closer, pitching 21 times in relief with a 2.13 ERA while striking out 37 batters in 25 1/3 innings, and setting the school's single-season record with 11 saves.

== Professional career ==
=== Philadelphia Phillies ===
Koplove was selected in the 17th round (504th overall) of the 2015 Major League Baseball draft by the Philadelphia Phillies, and signed for a $75,000 signing bonus.

In 2015, Koplove pitched for the Williamsport Crosscutters of the Low-A New York-Penn League, and logged a 2–3 record with a 4.50 ERA and 27 strikeouts across 23 relief appearances. In 2016, Koplove split the season between the Crosscutters and the Lakewood BlueClaws of the Single-A South Atlantic League, for whom he posted a cumulative 0-2 record and 7.34 ERA with 33 strikeouts over 38 innings pitched. Koplove was released by the Phillies organization on April 30, 2017.

=== Miami Marlins ===
On May 4, 2017, Koplove signed a minor league contract with the Miami Marlins organization. For the season, he played for the Lakewood BlueClaws and the Batavia Muckdogs of the Low-A New York-Penn League, and pitched to a combined 3–2 record with one save and a 7.84 ERA in 20 2/3 innings, in which he struck out 26 batters. Koplove underwent elbow surgery in November of the same year, and was released by the Marlins organization on March 31, 2018.

=== Sussex County Miners ===
On April 11, 2018, Koplove signed with the Sussex County Miners of the independent Can-Am League. In 31 appearances (nine starts) for Sussex County, he compiled a 7–4 record with 78 strikeouts, two saves, and a 2.61 ERA (3rd in the league), limiting opposing batters to a .201 batting average. In the playoffs in 2018, Koplove was 2–0 with one save and a 1.68 ERA over three appearances.

=== Colorado Rockies ===
On November 26, 2018, the Miners sold Koplove's contract to the Colorado Rockies. He spent the majority of the 2019 season with the High-A Lancaster JetHawks, pitching to a 2–1 record with a 3.60 ERA and 16 strikeouts over 15 innings of work; he also made one scoreless three-inning appearance (in which he struck out five batters) with the Triple-A Albuquerque Isotopes of the Pacific Coast League. Koplove was released by the Rockies organization on June 7, 2019.

=== Kansas City T-Bones ===
On June 19, 2019, Koplove signed with the Kansas City T-Bones of the American Association of Independent Professional Baseball. In six starts for the T-Bones, he registered a 2–3 record and 6.37 ERA with 28 strikeouts across 29 2/3 innings pitched. He was released by Kansas City on December 19.

== Team Israel; World Baseball Classic ==
Koplove was on the roster of Team Israel at the 2017 World Baseball Classic.
