= Ryan Prager =

American baseball player (born 2002)

Cleveland Guardians
- Pitcher
- Born: October 26, 2002 (age 23); Dallas, Texas, U.S.
- Bats: Left Throws: Left

Ryan Tyler Prager (born October 26, 2002) is an American professional baseball pitcher in the Cleveland Guardians organization.

== Amateur career ==
Prager attended Hillcrest High School in Dallas, Texas. As a senior in 2021, he pitched 63 innings and posted a 0.44 ERA with 136 strikeouts. He was not selected in the 2021 Major League Baseball draft, and enrolled at Texas A&M University to play college baseball for the Aggies.

As a freshman at Texas A&M in 2022, Prager started 16 games and went 1–4 with a 5.16 ERA and 53 strikeouts. After the season, he underwent Tommy John surgery, forcing him to miss the entirety of the 2023 season. Prager returned to play for the Aggies in 2024, starting 19 games and going 9–1 with a 2.95 ERA and 124 strikeouts over 97 2/3 innings. He was selected by the Los Angeles Angels in the third round of the 2024 Major League Baseball draft. However, he did not sign, and instead chose to enroll at Texas A&M for another season. Prager made 15 starts for Texas A&M in 2025 and went 4–4 with a 4.21 ERA and 73 strikeouts over 83 1/3 innings.

== Professional career ==
Prager was selected by the Cleveland Guardians in the ninth round (282nd overall) of the 2025 Major League Baseball draft. He signed with the team for $197,200.

Prager made his professional debut after signing with the Hill City Howlers with whom he appeared in two games. He opened the 2026 season with the Arizona Complex League Guardians and was promoted to Hill City after two games. Across 23 games (12 starts) between both teams, Prager had a 5–3 record, a 3.93 ERA, and 93 strikeouts across 71 innings pitched.

== International career ==
Prager was named to Team Israel for the 2026 World Baseball Classic.
