= Nate Fish =

American baseball player (born 1980)

- Utility Player / Coach
- Born: January 2, 1980 (age 46); Hanover, New Hampshire, U.S.
- Bats: Right Throws: Right
Medals
Men's baseball
Representing Israel
European Baseball Championship
Silver medal – second place	2021 Turin	Team

Nate Fish (Hebrew: נייט פיש; born January 2, 1980) is an American-Israeli writer, artist, professional baseball utility player, and coach. He is the CEO of Israel Baseball America, and manager of the Israel national baseball team. He previously managed the Savannah Bananas, an independent exhibition baseball team.

Fish played shortstop, third base, outfield, and catcher. He won three medals at the Maccabiah Games. He played for the Tel Aviv Lightning in the only year of the Israel Baseball League. He served as national director for the Israel Association of Baseball (IAB). Fish coached for the Israel national baseball team, in the 2013 and 2017 qualifiers for the World Baseball Classic, and was Team Israel's first base coach in the 2017 World Baseball Classic in South Korea and Japan. In 2017 and 2018, Fish was an assistant coach for the Yarmouth–Dennis Red Sox in the Cape Cod Baseball League. In 2019, he worked as a minor league coach for the Los Angeles Dodgers. Fish was the bullpen coach for Team Israel in the 2023 World Baseball Classic.

Fish has published a number of magazine features and poems, and has had two solo exhibitions of visual art in New York City. He was inducted into the Shaker Heights High School Alumni Hall of Fame in 2016.

== Early life ==
Fish was born in Hanover, New Hampshire, and is Jewish. He moved to Cleveland, Ohio, when he was 12 and grew up there.

== Baseball ==
=== United States ===
Fish attended Shaker Heights High School from 1994 to 1998. He was a high school teammate of Matt Guerrier, who went on to play for the Minnesota Twins, Los Angeles Dodgers, and Chicago Cubs. Fish played for the school's varsity baseball team for three years, earning all-region honors each year, and served as team captain his senior year.

From 1998 to 2002, Fish played baseball at the University of Cincinnati with his close friend—the only other Jewish player on the team—future Boston Red Sox star Kevin Youkilis. While playing for the Cincinnati Bearcats, Fish appeared in 181 games, batting .249 with 22 doubles, 13 home runs, and 71 RBIs. As a senior, Fish was the captain of the Bearcats, hit .287 with seven home runs, and set the Conference USA record with six hits in a game.

At the 2005 Maccabiah Games Fish played for Team USA, and won a gold medal. Fish later was the head coach of the United States Junior National Team for the 2013 Maccabiah Games. The team won a gold medal in 2013 Maccabiah Games boys' baseball.

In 2010, Fish co-founded and managed the Yorkville Baseball Academy in New York City.

In 2017, he was Assistant Coach of the Yarmouth-Dennis Red Sox of the Cape Cod Baseball League.

In 2021, Fish was announced as manager of the Savannah Bananas Premier Pro Team

=== Israel ===
The Israel Association of Baseball appointed Nate Fish as the manager for the senior national team in August 2021. Prior to that he served a number of positions including player and coach.

==== European Baseball Championship ====
Fish was the starting shortstop for Israel in the 2014 and 2015 qualifying rounds for the 2016 European Baseball Championship. The team won the C Pool in 2014, and finished third in the B Pool in 2015, behind Sweden and Austria.

In the C-Level qualifier in 2014, Fish was the starting shortstop in all five games, and batted third. During the opening game against Finland, Fish went 3-for-5 with a double, a walk, 2 RBIs, and a run scored. During the second game, against Slovenia, Fish went 0-for-4 and was hit by a pitch. During the third game, against Latvia, Fish went 1-for-4 with a walk and an RBI. In the semifinals game against Romania, Fish went 2-for-5 with a home run and a strikeout. In the finals, against Slovenia, Fish went 1-for-5 with a run scored, as Israel went on to win 14-0 and moved on to the B-Level qualifier.

In the B-Level qualifier in 2015, Fish was once the starting shortstop in all five games, and batted fifth. During the opening game against Belarus, Fish went 2-for-4 with a double, two walks, and a run scored. During the second game, against Poland, Fish went 1-for-3 with a walk. During the third game, against Austria, Fish went 2-for-4 with a RBI, a run, and was hit by a pitch twice. During the fourth game, against Lithuania, Fish got a walk and a double in four at-bats, and struck out once. During the final game against Sweden, Fish went 2-for-5 with a double and a strikeout.

Fish was manager of the Israel team that came second at the 2021 European Championships.

==== World Baseball Classic ====
Fish was the bullpen catcher and coach for Team Israel at the 2013 World Baseball Classic in Jupiter, Florida. Team Israel beat Spain and South Africa, but lost in the finals to Spain and did not qualify for the 2013 WBC.

In 2016, Fish was on the coaching staff for Israel at the 2017 World Baseball Classic qualifier in Brooklyn, New York. Team Israel beat Great Britain and Brazil to qualify for the 2017 World Baseball Classic. In March 2017 he returned in the same role in the main tournament. He was Team Israel's first base coach in the 2017 World Baseball Classic in South Korea and Japan.

==== 2020 Olympic Games ====
Fish was 3rd base coach of the Israel team that finished 5th at the 2020 Olympic Games.

==== Other Israel activities ====
In 2007, Fish played third base for the Tel Aviv Lightning in the only year of the Israel Baseball League. He hit .347 and won the gold glove award for the best defensive infielder in the league. He was also one of the subjects of the award-winning film Holy Land Hardball, about the league.

From 2013 to 2016, Fish lived in Israel and worked as the national director for the Israel Association of Baseball. He made aliyah in 2013 to accept the position, and spent his time visiting Israeli schools to introduce kids to baseball.

While serving as director for Israel Baseball, Fish co-founded the program Baseball Le’Kulam (Baseball for All) to bring Arab and Jewish kids in Israel together. Baseball Le'Kulam was featured during the 2016 AIPAC conference in Washington DC.

=== Other ===
In 2008, Fish played for the Haar Disciples in Germany’s Bundesliga. He hit .320 while fielding .947 while playing third base and catching. He was Haar's #2 offensive producer, and was second in the league in fielding among starting third basemen.

Fish has also played baseball professionally in Argentina, Puerto Rico, and the Dominican Republic.

=== Israel Baseball Americas ===
In March 2024, Fish was the inaugural CEO of Israel Baseball America, an organization that represents Israel Baseball in the States and the rest of the world.

== Other ventures ==
=== Writing ===
Fish has a degree from the New School University in New York with a focus on creative writing. He has published features in Heeb Magazine and Leveled Magazine. In 2012, he created the blog King of Jewish Baseball. In 2016, he established the Brick of Gold Publishing Company. Fish's first book was Israelis Drive Anything, a photo series of Israelis driving homemade vehicles. He has since released two collections of poetry, 98.6 Poems, and Poems for My Wife: Love Poems for Non-Romantics. The Brick of Gold Publishing Company has also released two books of writing from California State Prisons edited by Fish, Man, I Wish We Would Have Known: Letters from Calipatria State Prison, and Disconnected/Reconnected: Writing from Lancaster State Prison. He is the Author and publisher of You're A Racist: Thoughts on Race in America and 128-G.

=== Art ===
In 2002 Fish moved to Brooklyn in order to focus on visual arts. He is a self-taught artist. He had solo exhibitions in 2011 (Jellybeans) at Gallery Bar in Manhattan’s Lower East Side, and in 2013 (Natureficial) at the Red Door Gallery in Chelsea.
