= RJ Schreck =

Toronto Blue Jays
- Outfielder
- Born: July 12, 2000 (age 26); Los Angeles, California, U.S.
- Bats: Left Throws: Right
- Stats at Baseball Reference

Robert Jonathan Schreck (born July 12, 2000) is an American professional baseball outfielder for the Toronto Blue Jays of Major League Baseball (MLB). He is ranked 9th on Major League Baseball's 2026 Top 30 Blue Jays prospects list.

== Early life ==
Schreck attended Harvard-Westlake School in Los Angeles, California.

== Career ==
=== College ===
He played college baseball at Duke University for four years before transferring to Vanderbilt University for one year. In 2021 with Duke, he batted .337(9th in the Atlantic Coast Conference)/.435/.635(6th) with 49 runs (10th) 18 home runs (5th), and 52 RBIs (7th) in 208 at bats. That year, he also played collegiate summer baseball with the Cotuit Kettleers of the Cape Cod Baseball League.

=== Seattle Mariners ===
He was selected by the Seattle Mariners in the ninth round of the 2023 Major League Baseball draft. Schreck started his professional career with the Arizona Complex League Mariners before being promoted to the Modesto Nuts after two games. He started the 2024 season with the Everett AquaSox and was promoted to the Arkansas Travelers. On July 29, 2024, the Mariners traded Schreck to the Toronto Blue Jays in exchange for Justin Turner.

=== Toronto Blue Jays ===
He started his Blue Jays career with the New Hampshire Fisher Cats. Between his three 2024 teams combined, he batted .251/.388/.462 with 69 runs, 29 doubles, 17 home runs, and 62 RBIs in 398 at bats. He was named a Northwest League Player of the Week, an International League Player of the Week, and a Northwest League post-season All Star.

In 2025, playing primarily for the Buffalo Bisons and New Hampshire Fisher Cats, with a combined 17 at bats as well with the Dunedin Blue Jays and FCL Blue Jays, he batted a combined .249/.395/.459 with 62 runs, 18 home runs, and 53 RBIs in 342 at bats.

On November 17, 2026, He had his contract selected to the 40-man roster to protect him from the Rule 5 draft.
