= 2019 European Baseball Championship – B-Pool =

2019 European Baseball Championship B-Pool
Tournament details
- Countries: Slovakia; Bulgaria
- Dates: 1–6 July 2019
- Teams: 14

The 2019 European Baseball Championship - B-Pool was the second tier of the Confederation of European Baseball men's competition. It featured 14 teams, competing in two groups of 6 and 8 teams in early July 2019. The two group winners, Team Israel and Team Lithuania, faced off in the 2019 European Baseball Playoff Series for the last qualifying spot for the 2019 European Baseball Championship, with Team Israel prevailing.

== Teams ==
Nine teams remained from the 2017 Pool B competition:

- Belarus
- Bulgaria
- Israel
- Lithuania
- Poland
- Russia
- Serbia
- Slovakia
- Switzerland

Five additional teams advanced from 2018 Pool C.

- Greece
- Ireland
- Ukraine
- Romania
- Finland

== Group 1 - Trnava ==
=== Pool A ===
Qualified for Final
Did not qualify for Final

#	Teams	W	L
1	Switzerland	3	0
2	Ukraine	2	1
3	Poland	1	2
4	Finland	0	3

July 2, 2019; 10:00	Switzerland	16–9	Finland	Trnava; Attendance: 20
July 2, 2019; 10:00		Boxscore		Trnava; Attendance: 20

July 2, 2019; 17:00	Poland	1–11 (7)	Ukraine	Bratislava; Attendance: 46
July 2, 2019; 17:00		Boxscore		Bratislava; Attendance: 46

July 3, 2019; 13:30	Finland	6–21 (7)	Poland	Trnava; Attendance: 50
July 3, 2019; 13:30		Boxscore		Trnava; Attendance: 50

July 3, 2019; 17:00	Ukraine	1–2	Switzerland	Trnava; Attendance: 45
July 3, 2019; 17:00		Boxscore		Trnava; Attendance: 45

July 4, 2019; 10:00	Ukraine	14-0 (7)	Finland	Trnava; Attendance: 20
July 4, 2019; 10:00		Boxscore		Trnava; Attendance: 20

July 4, 2019; 17:00	Switzerland	11-10	Poland	Bratislava; Attendance: 60
July 4, 2019; 17:00		Boxscore		Bratislava; Attendance: 60

=== Pool B ===
#	Teams	W	L
1	Slovakia	2	1
2	Lithuania	2	1
3	Belarus	2	1
4	Romania	0	3

July 2, 2019; 13:30	Lithuania	8–6	Romania	Trnava; Attendance: 30
July 2, 2019; 13:30		Boxscore		Trnava; Attendance: 30

July 2, 2019; 17:00	Slovakia	10–1	Belarus	Trnava; Attendance: 250
July 2, 2019; 17:00		Boxscore		Trnava; Attendance: 250

July 3, 2019; 10:00	Belarus	4-3	Lithuania	Trnava; Attendance: 50
July 3, 2019; 10:00		Boxscore		Trnava; Attendance: 50

July 3, 2019; 17:00	Romania	1–19 (6)	Slovakia	Bratislava; Attendance: 100
July 3, 2019; 17:00		Boxscore		Bratislava; Attendance: 100

July 4, 2019; 13:30	Belarus	1-0	Romania	Trnava; Attendance: 20
July 4, 2019; 13:30		Boxscore		Trnava; Attendance: 20

July 4, 2019; 17:00	Lithuania	19-15	Slovakia	Trnava; Attendance: 120
July 4, 2019; 17:00		Boxscore		Trnava; Attendance: 120

=== Play-Offs ===
Semifinals
July 5 13:30 Trnava
Switzerland	7
Lithuania	12
July 5 17:00 Trnava
Slovakia	1
Ukraine	18

Finals
July 6 17:00 Trnava
Lithuania	7
Ukraine	5
3rd Place
July 6 13:30 Trnava
Switzerland	9
Slovakia	11

=== Semifinals ===
Semifinals order will be switched, because home team advanced to this round.

July 5, 2019; 13:30	Switzerland	7-12	Lithuania	Trnava; Attendance: 50
July 5, 2019; 13:30		Boxscore		Trnava; Attendance: 50

July 5, 2019; 17:00	Slovakia	1-18 (6)	Ukraine	Trnava
July 5, 2019; 17:00		Boxscore		Trnava

=== 3rd-place game ===
July 6, 2019; 13:30	Switzerland	9-11	Slovakia	Trnava; Attendance: 40
July 6, 2019; 13:30		Boxscore		Trnava; Attendance: 40

=== Finals ===
July 6, 2019; 17:00	Lithuania	7-5	Ukraine	Trnava; Attendance: 100
July 6, 2019; 17:00		Boxscore		Trnava; Attendance: 100

=== Classification round – Pool C ===
Pos.	Teams	W	L
5	Belarus	3	0
6	Poland	2	1
7	Finland	1	2
8	Romania	0	3

July 5, 2019; 10:00	Belarus	14-4	Finland	Trnava; Attendance: 20
July 5, 2019; 10:00		Boxscore		Trnava; Attendance: 20

July 5, 2019; 17:00	Poland	10-1	Romania	Bratislava; Attendance: 45
July 5, 2019; 17:00		Boxscore		Bratislava; Attendance: 45

July 6, 2019; 10:00	Romania	14-20	Finland	Trnava; Attendance: 20
July 6, 2019; 10:00		Boxscore		Trnava; Attendance: 20

July 6, 2019; 13:30	Belarus	12-2	Poland	Bratislava; Attendance: 20
July 6, 2019; 13:30		Boxscore		Bratislava; Attendance: 20

=== Final standings ===
#	Teams
1	Lithuania
2	Ukraine
3	Slovakia
4	Switzerland
5	Belarus
6	Poland
7	Finland
8	Romania

== Group 2 - Blagoevgrad ==
Qualified for Final
Did not qualify for Final

#	Teams	W	L
1	Israel	5	0
2	Russia	4	1
3	Greece	3	2
4	Serbia	2	3
5	Ireland	1	4
6	Bulgaria	0	5

July 1, 2019; 10:00	Greece	7–14	Israel	Blagoevgrad; Attendance: 75
July 1, 2019; 10:00		Boxscore		Blagoevgrad; Attendance: 75

July 1, 2019; 13:30	Serbia	17–5 (7)	Ireland	Blagoevgrad; Attendance: 60
July 1, 2019; 13:30		Boxscore		Blagoevgrad; Attendance: 60

July 1, 2019; 17:30	Bulgaria	0–21 (5)	Russia	Blagoevgrad; Attendance: 52
July 1, 2019; 17:30		Boxscore		Blagoevgrad; Attendance: 52

July 2, 2019; 10:00	Israel	11–1 (8)	Serbia	Blagoevgrad; Attendance: 85
July 2, 2019; 10:00		Boxscore		Blagoevgrad; Attendance: 85

July 2, 2019; 13:30	Russia	14–1	Greece	Blagoevgrad; Attendance: 60
July 2, 2019; 13:30		Boxscore		Blagoevgrad; Attendance: 60

July 2, 2019; 17:30	Ireland	5–0	Bulgaria	Blagoevgrad; Attendance: 72
July 2, 2019; 17:30		Boxscore		Blagoevgrad; Attendance: 72

July 3, 2019; 10:00	Serbia	5–9	Greece	Blagoevgrad; Attendance: 68
July 3, 2019; 10:00		Boxscore		Blagoevgrad; Attendance: 68

July 3, 2019; 13:30	Russia	13–3 (7)	Ireland	Blagoevgrad; Attendance: 47
July 3, 2019; 13:30		Boxscore		Blagoevgrad; Attendance: 47

July 3, 2019; 17:30	Israel	8–0	Bulgaria	Blagoevgrad; Attendance: 50
July 3, 2019; 17:30		Boxscore		Blagoevgrad; Attendance: 50

July 4, 2019; 10:00	Greece	3-0	Ireland	Blagoevgrad; Attendance: 60
July 4, 2019; 10:00		Boxscore		Blagoevgrad; Attendance: 60

July 4, 2019; 13:30	Israel	13-12 (10)	Russia	Blagoevgrad; Attendance: 60
July 4, 2019; 13:30		Boxscore		Blagoevgrad; Attendance: 60

July 4, 2019; 17:30	Serbia	7-2	Bulgaria	Blagoevgrad; Attendance: 83
July 4, 2019; 17:30		Boxscore		Blagoevgrad; Attendance: 83

July 5, 2019; 10:00	Ireland	3-10 (7)	Israel	Blagoevgrad; Attendance: 42
July 5, 2019; 10:00		Boxscore		Blagoevgrad; Attendance: 42

July 5, 2019; 13:30	Russia	12-3	Serbia	Blagoevgrad; Attendance: 45
July 5, 2019; 13:30		Boxscore		Blagoevgrad; Attendance: 45

July 5, 2019; 17:30	Bulgaria	6-9	Greece	Blagoevgrad; Attendance: 86
July 5, 2019; 17:30		Boxscore		Blagoevgrad; Attendance: 86

=== Final ===
July 6, 2019; 10:00	Israel	5-3	Russia	Blagoevgrad; Attendance: 126
July 6, 2019; 10:00		Boxscore		Blagoevgrad; Attendance: 126

=== Final standings ===
Qualified for playoffs
Did not qualify for playoffs

#	Teams
1	Israel
2	Russia
3	Greece
4	Serbia
5	Ireland
6	Bulgaria

== Teams advancing to playoffs ==
- Lithuania
- Israel
