= Troy Neiman =

American baseball player

Free agent
- Pitcher
- Born: November 13, 1990 (age 35); Castaic, California, U.S.
- Bats: Right Throws: Right
- Stats at Baseball Reference

Troy Davenport Neiman (born November 13, 1990) is an American former professional baseball relief pitcher. He is 6' 6", and weighs 230 pounds.

Neiman pitched in college for the Chico State Wildcats, finishing his career there with the second-lowest ERA in university history (1.89), and the 10th-best career winning percentage (.722) and number of strikeouts (126). In July 2013 the Colorado Rockies signed him as a free agent to a minor league contract. Through 2017, in his minor league career—exclusively as a relief pitcher—he was 23-10 with a 3.34 ERA, had struck out 304 batters in 301.2 innings, and kept opposing batters to a batting average of .230.

Neiman pitched for Team Israel at the 2017 World Baseball Classic.

== Early life ==
Neiman was born in Castaic, California, and is Jewish. His paternal grandfather is a sound technician who has won an Academy Award for technical innovation and two Emmy Awards. He pitched for Valencia High School in Santa Clarita, California.

== College ==
Neiman pitched in college for the Chico State Wildcats, finishing his career there with the second-lowest ERA in university history (1.89), and the 10th-best career winning percentage (.722) and number of strikeouts (126). In February 2013 he pitched the first six innings of the first no-hitter in team history, and was only removed because he was on a strict pitch count. For February 4–10, 2013, he was named Rawlings/California Collegiate Athletic Association (CCAA) Baseball Pitcher of the Week. He was voted to the 2013 National Collegiate Baseball Writers Association (NCBWA) All-West-Region Second Team and the 2013 All-CCAA Baseball Second Team.

== Minor leagues ==
Neiman was undrafted out of Chico State University in the 2013 Major League Baseball draft. In July 2013 the Colorado Rockies signed him as a free agent to a minor league contract.

He began his professional career in 2013 with the Tri-City Dust Devils of the A− Northwest League. In 12 games he was 2-1 with a 3.86 ERA.

In 2014 Neiman pitched for the Asheville Tourists of the A South Atlantic League. In 47 games he was 7-1 with a 1.59 ERA, and in 79 innings he struck out 89 batters. In 2015 and 2016 he pitched for the Modesto Nuts of the A+ California League. In 2015, in 40 games he was 3-2 with a 4.76 ERA, and in 2016 in 45 games he was 7-4 with a 3.55 ERA and struck out 83 batters in 71 innings.

In 2017 he pitched for the Hartford Yard Goats of the Double-A Eastern League, again playing for Manager Jerry Weinstein who had managed him months earlier as manager of Team Israel in the World Baseball Classic. In 35 relief appearances he was 4-2 with a 3.66 ERA.

Through 2017, in his minor league career—exclusively as a relief pitcher—he was 23-10 with a 3.34 ERA, had struck out 304 batters in 301.2 innings, and kept opposing batters to a batting average of .230. On December 19, 2017, Neiman was released by the Rockies.

== Team Israel ==
Neiman was on the roster for Israel at the 2017 World Baseball Classic qualifier, but he did not make an appearance during the tournament.

He pitched for Team Israel at the 2017 World Baseball Classic, in March 2017. Neiman pitched against Chinese-Taipei and the Netherlands.
