= Tom Gamboa =

American baseball coach (born 1948)

- Coach
- Born: February 28, 1948 (age 78); Los Angeles, California, U.S.
- Bats: Left Throws: Left
- Stats at Baseball Reference

Teams
- As coach: Chicago Cubs (1998–1999); Kansas City Royals (2001–2003)

Thomas Harold Gamboa (born February 28, 1948) is an American professional baseball coach and manager.

Gamboa has managed in the minor leagues as high as Triple-A (the Toledo Mud Hens in the International League and the Albuquerque Dukes in the Pacific Coast League), and coached first and third base as well as in the bullpen for major league teams (the Chicago Cubs and Kansas City Royals). In September 2016, Gamboa was the bench coach for Israel at the 2017 World Baseball Classic qualifier, and he continued in the same role for Team Israel at the 2017 World Baseball Classic main tournament in South Korea and Japan.

== Early life and education ==
Gamboa was born in Los Angeles, California, and now lives in Rancho Mirage, California. He was raised by his mother, Polly, and his step-father (whose surname he took), Jack Donald Gamboa. Gamboa is fluent in Spanish. He has five children. His son Brett is an assistant professor of English at Dartmouth College.

He was drafted out of Notre Dame High School in Sherman Oaks, California, where he was a first baseman, by the Baltimore Orioles, but chose to attend the University of California, Santa Barbara (B.A., History, 1971) on a full scholarship. There, he played primarily center field, along with a little first base, for the Gauchos baseball team for three years and won All-Big West Conference honors in 1969 and 1970.

== Playing career ==
During the 1971–1972 seasons Gamboa was an outfielder for and manager of Stratford (Ontario) in the Canadian Baseball League, where he was a two-time All-Star.

== Managing, scouting, and coaching career ==
=== Minor Leagues ===
Gamboa was a manager, minor league instructor, and scouting supervisor in the Milwaukee Brewers organization from 1978 to 1982. In 1979, at the age of 31, he managed the Butte Copper Kings in the Rookie Pioneer League. In 1983 he managed the Paintsville Brewers in the Rookie Appalachian League to a league-leading .653 won-loss percentage, and the league title. In 1984 he managed the Beloit Brewers in the Single-A Midwest League to a Central Division-leading .619 won–lost percentage, and was voted Manager of the Year. In 1985 he managed the Stockton Ports in the Single-A California League to a North Division-leading .566 won-loss percentage, and the Division championship.

In 1986 he managed the Bristol Tigers in the Appalachian League and served as the Detroit Tigers western states scouting director, and in 1987 he managed the Glens Falls Tigers in the Double-A Eastern League; both, affiliates of the Detroit Tigers. He was the minor league field coordinator for the Detroit Tigers from 1987 to 1990. He managed the Toledo Mud Hens in the Triple-A International League for the Detroit Tigers in 1990. He was the Director of Minor League Instruction for the San Diego Padres from 1991 to 1994. He was the Chicago Cubs' Minor League Field Coordinator from 1995 to 1998.

In 2000, Gamboa managed the Dodgers' Albuquerque Dukes of the Triple-A Pacific Coast League to a Central Division-leading .597 won-lost percentage and title.

In 2005, Gamboa managed the Arkansas Travelers of the Double-A Texas League to the Texas League Eastern Division title for the Los Angeles Angels. In 2006 and 2007, he was Minor League Outfield/Baserunning Coordinator for the San Diego Padres. In 2009, he was the minor league field coordinator for the Padres.

In 2011, he managed the Inland Empire 66ers of the High-A California League (through June, when he resigned to spend time with his 85-year-old mother, who was terminally ill with advanced cancer), an affiliate of the Los Angeles Angels. That year he also played "Scout Martinez" in the Oscar-nominated 2011 baseball movie Moneyball.

During the 2012 California Winter League (Palm Springs, California), Gamboa served as the Field Coordinator.

From 2014 to 2016, Gamboa managed the Brooklyn Cyclones of the Liw-A New York-Pennsylvania League, an affiliate of the New York Mets.

=== Major Leagues ===
From 1973 to 1975 he was a scout for the Baltimore Orioles, and from 1976 to 1977 he was a scout for the Major League Baseball Scouting Bureau.

He was the Chicago Cubs' first base and third base coach in 1998–1999.

Gamboa was a Major League coach for the Kansas City Royals from 2001 to 2003, serving as the bullpen coach in 2001 and 2003 and the team's first base coach in 2002. While he was the Royals first base coach, he was attacked on the field at Comiskey Park by two fans during a game against the Chicago White Sox on September 19, 2002. Gamboa suffered permanent hearing loss in his right ear.

=== International winter leagues ===
Gamboa managed the Indios de Mayagüez in Puerto Rico's Liga de Béisbol Profesional Roberto Clemente in seven winter league seasons from 1995 to 1996 through 2002–03, reaching the finals in six seasons and winning three championships, managed in six Puerto Rican League All-Star games, and was named Manager of the Year following the 1995–96 and 1996–97 seasons. In 2002, he was inducted into the Association of Major League Legends of Latin America.

Gamboa managed Naranjeros de Hermosillo in the Liga Mexicana del Pacífico winter league in 2004.

=== Team Israel; World Baseball Classic ===
In September 2016, Gamboa was the bench coach for Israel at the 2017 World Baseball Classic qualifier. In an interview, he said he was serving as a Coach, due to his longtime friendship with manager Jerry Weinstein, and his knowledge of MCU Park (where the Qualifier was being played) even though he wasn't Jewish. He continued in a similar role for Team Israel at the 2017 World Baseball Classic main tournament in South Korea and Japan. During those games, Gamboa served as the third base coach as well.

=== College league ===
In 2010, he managed the Palm Springs Power of the Southern California Collegiate Baseball League to a 34–4 mark, the best in team history.

== Minor league managing career ==
- Paintsville Brewers (1983)
- Beloit Brewers (1984)
- Stockton Ports (1985)
- Bristol Tigers (1986)
- Albuquerque Dukes (2000)
- Arkansas Travelers (2005)
- Palm Springs Power (2010)
- Inland Empire 66ers (2011) first half
- Brooklyn Cyclones (2014–2016)
