= R. C. Orlan =

American baseball player

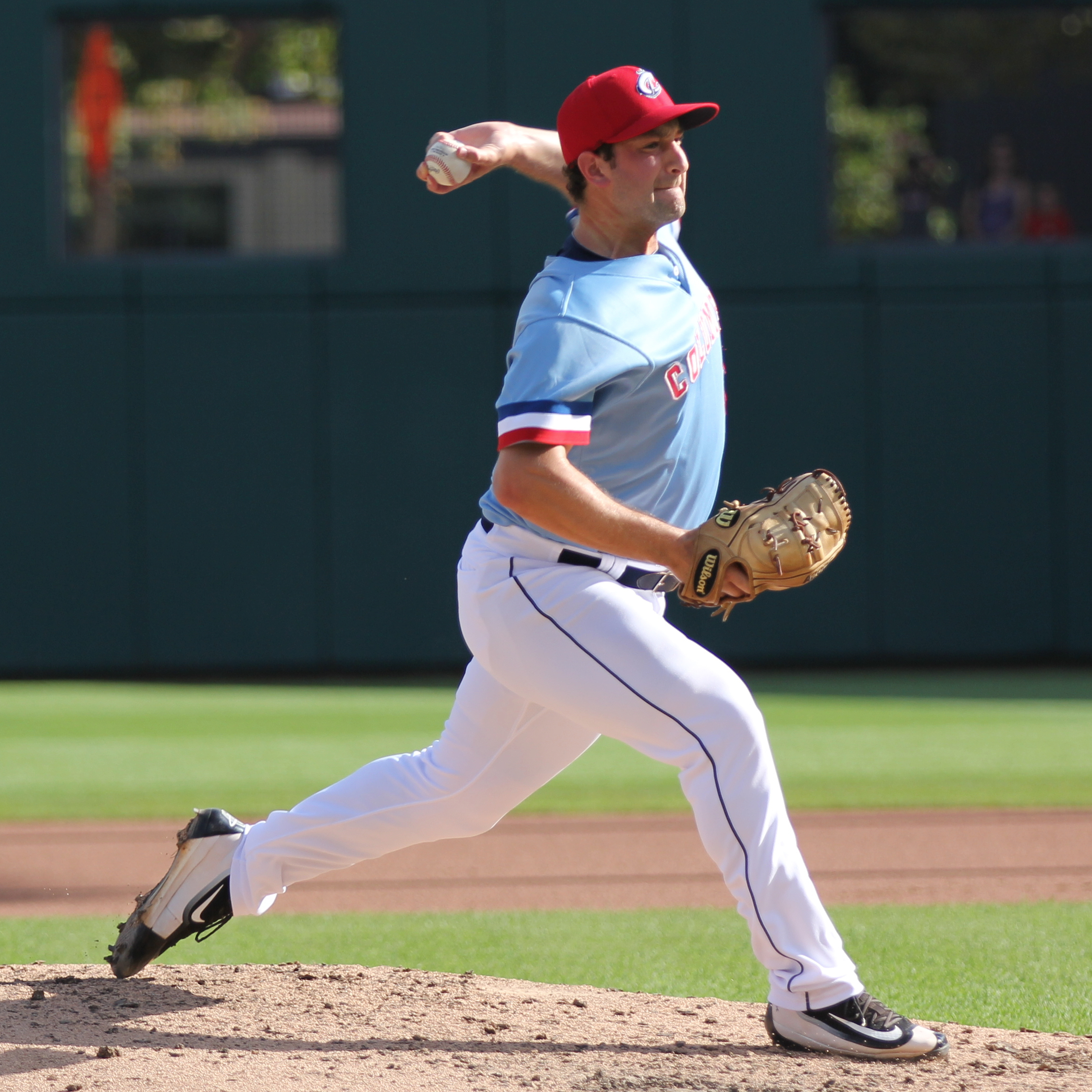
- Orlan with the Columbus Clippers in 2018
- Pitcher
- Born: September 28, 1990 (age 35); Bryn Mawr, Pennsylvania
- Bats: Right Throws: Left
- Stats at Baseball Reference

Robert Charles Orlan (born September 28, 1990) is an American former professional baseball pitcher.

In high school in Virginia, he was All-District as a pitcher as a junior, All-State as a utility player as a senior, and All-District Academic three years. He was drafted by the Washington Nationals in the 30th round of the 2012 Major League Baseball draft out of the University of North Carolina at Chapel Hill. In 2016, he led the Class A-Advanced Carolina League in holds, with eight.

He pitched for Team Israel at the 2017 World Baseball Classic, in March 2017.

== Early life ==
Orlan was born in Bryn Mawr, Pennsylvania, grew up in Glen Allen, Virginia, and is Jewish. He is the son of Adam and Margie Orlan. His father ran for the Wolverines track team at the University of Michigan, and became a corporate executive in New York. His paternal grandfather was Herbert Orlan, who was born in the Bronx, New York, to Abraham and Flora (Rothouse) Orlansky, and his paternal grandmother is Marilyn Orlan. Orlan attended Deep Run High School (2009) in Glen Allen, where he pitched and played first base and outfield for the baseball team while batting right-handed. He was All-District as a pitcher as a junior, All-State as a utility player as a senior, and All-District Academic three years. He threw a fastball, circle change, curveball, and slider. He was timed at 7.41 in the 60-yard dash. He was drafted by the Los Angeles Dodgers in the 44th round of the 2009 Major League Baseball draft from Deep Run High School, but did not sign and instead elected to attend college. For college, Orlan attended the University of North Carolina at Chapel Hill, where he majored in Management and pitched for the Tar Heels. As a freshman in 2010, he pitched 12.1 innings. In the summer of 2010 he pitched for the Bourne Braves of the Cape Cod League, and had a 3.06 ERA. As a sophomore in 2011, in 32 games he was 2-0 with a 3.79 ERA, striking out 24 batters in 19 innings. In the summer of 2011 he again pitched for the Bourne Braves, and had a 1.50 ERA with 21 strikeouts in 18 innings. As a junior in 2012, in 38 games (leading the Atlantic Coast Conference) Orlan was 8-1 with a 2.21 ERA, striking out 66 batters in 57 innings as he walked 11 hitters. He was drafted by the Washington Nationals in the 30th round of the 2012 Major League Baseball draft from the University of North Carolina at Chapel Hill, and signed in January 2013.

== Professional career ==
Orlan began his professional career in 2013 with the Auburn Doubledays of the Low-A New York-Penn League, starting 11 of the 13 games in which he pitched, and going 1-5 with a 3.65 ERA. In 2014 Orlan pitched again for Auburn, going 1-0 with a 4.19 ERA in 17 relief appearances as he struck out 37 batters in 34 1/3 innings, and pitched for the Hagerstown Suns of the A South Atlantic League, going 0-2 with a 6.28 ERA in 6 relief appearances as he struck out 21 batters in 14 1/3 innings.

In 2015 Orlan pitched again for Hagerstown, going 3-1 with a 3.23 ERA and 4 saves in 27 relief appearances as he stuck out 68 batters in 55 2/3 innings, and pitched for the Potomac Nationals of the High-A Carolina League, going 0-0 with a 2.20 ERA and a save in 8 relief appearances while striking out 17 batters in 16 1/3 innings. In 2016, he again pitched for the Potomac Nationals, going 5-6 with a 3.93 ERA and 8 holds (leading the league) in 41 relief appearances (4th in the league) as he held his opponents to a .211 batting average.

In 2017, Orlan began the season pitching for the Potomac Nationals, and was 2-1 with a 3.21 ERA with 5 saves and 29 strikeouts in 28 innings. He was promoted to the Harrisburg Senators of the Double-A Eastern League, where he was 1-3 with a 5.09 ERA and 24 strikeouts in 23 innings.

The Cleveland Indians drafted Orlan in the minor league phase of the Rule 5 draft on December 14, 2017. Orlan pitched for five minor league teams in 2018, primarily for the Akron RubberDucks in the Double-A Eastern League, going 1-0 with 3 saves and an 0.61 ERA in 23 games over 29 2/3 innings, in which he walked 7 batters and struck out 39.

The Indians re-signed Orlan to a minor league contract on October 25, 2018. The deal included an invitation to the Indians' 2019 major league spring training camp. In 2019, Orlan pitched for the Columbus Clippers of the Triple-A International League, and was 0-2 with a 7.53 ERA across 14 1/3 innings of work. Orlan was released by the Indians organization on May 14, 2019.

== World Baseball Classic; Team Israel ==
Orlan was on the roster to pitch for Israel at the 2017 World Baseball Classic qualifier. Although he did not pitch, his father was quoted saying "I am very proud of Team Israel, it has been a fun experience."

Orlan pitched for Team Israel at the 2017 World Baseball Classic main tournament in March 2017. He relieved in two games, getting five outs while giving up one hit and one earned run.

== See also ==
- List of select Jewish baseball players
