= Israel at the World Baseball Classic =

Team Israel has competed in the World Baseball Classic since the 2013 World Baseball Classic qualifier round. In 2017 Israel competed at a World Baseball Classic qualifier for the second time, and for the first time qualified for the main tournament.

Prior to the start of the 2017 World Baseball Classic, ESPN considered Team Israel, ranked 41st in the world, to be the biggest underdog in the tournament, referring to it as the "Jamaican bobsled team of the WBC". Israel's odds to win the WBC were 200–1, before the tournament began. As the team began to win games at the WBC, its performance was described variously as a Cinderella story, a "David and Goliath" tale, and a baseball version of The Mouse That Roared. Israel beat all three opposing teams in the first round to finish atop the pool, defeating South Korea (ranked # 3 in the world), Chinese Taipei (ranked # 4 in the world; Israel's 15 runs were the most Taiwan had ever given up in a game in World Baseball Classic play), and the Netherlands (ranked # 9 in the world). Israel became the first baseball team to go undefeated in the first round of the WBC’s main draw after entering the main draw by winning in a qualifying round. Team Israel's catcher, Ryan Lavarnway, was named Pool A MVP. Team Israel qualified for the second round; Pool E in Tokyo, Japan, to be played later in March 2017. Furthermore, the team qualified for the 2021 World Baseball Classic.

In the first game of the 2017 World Baseball Classic second round, Israel beat Cuba (ranked # 5 in the world). In a rematch of their Pool A game in which Israel prevailed, the Netherlands defeated Israel, giving the team its first loss of the tournament, and then world # 1 Japan beat Israel. Israel finished in third place in Pool E with a 1–2 record, and 4-2 (and sixth) overall in the tournament. Pitcher Josh Zeid was named to the 2017 All-World Baseball Classic team.

== Player eligibility ==
Under WBC rules, any player eligible to be a citizen of a country is entitled to play for that country's baseball team, even if the player has not obtained citizenship. Israel's Law of Return gives anyone with a Jewish parent or grandparent, or who is married to a Jew, the right to return to Israel and to be an Israeli citizen. The WBC rules thus allow non-Israeli citizens of Jewish heritage to play for Team Israel.

In 2013, a number of Major League players of Jewish descent, including Ian Kinsler and Kevin Youkilis, publicly expressed interest in playing for Team Israel in the World Baseball Classic. However, while some of the qualifying rounds were played after the conclusion of the 2012 season and included Major League players, Israel's qualifier was played in September 2012, during the Major League season. Without its Major League players, Israel narrowly lost its qualifier to Spain (which had no Major League players at the time and thus was not affected by the scheduling).

Israel was put into the same position during the qualifiers for the 2017 tournament. Three of the four qualifiers took place during 2016 spring training, and included Major League players. However, Israel's qualifier took place in September 2016.

== Record ==
=== Record by year ===
World Baseball Classic record							Qualification record			
Year	Round	Position	W	L	RS	RA	W	L	RS	RA
2006	did not enter						No qualifiers held			
2009	did not enter						No qualifiers held			
2013	did not qualify						2	1	18	14
(South Korea) (Japan) 2017	Round 2	6th	4	2	30	31	3	0	15	3
(United States) 2023	Round 1	14th	1	3	4	26	Automatically qualified			
(United States) 2026	Round 1	12th	2	2	15	23	Automatically qualified			
Total	Round 2	3/6	7	7	49	80	5	1	33	17

=== Record by team ===
Team	GP	W	L	RF	RA
Chinese Taipei	1	1	0	15	7
Cuba	1	1	0	4	1
Japan	1	0	1	3	8
Netherlands	3	2	1	12	16
South Korea	1	1	0	2	1
Nicaragua	2	2	0	8	2
Venezuela	2	0	2	4	16
Dominican Republic	2	0	2	1	20
Puerto Rico	1	0	1	0	10
Total	14	7	7	49	81

== 2009 tournament bid ==
Israel applied to participate in the 2009 World Baseball Classic. In 2007, the inaugural season of the Israel Baseball League brought a large interest to the sport in Israel, causing Israel to apply to entry for the tournament. The Israel Association of Baseball (IAB) hoped appearing in the tournament would increase interest in the sport within Israel, in an effort to capitalize on the growing support. Israel had hoped that if the IBL was success they would be able to build a team with Israeli born talent. Marvin Goldklang, head of the IAB, however, talked about eventually having a team made up of Jewish Major Leaguers. Although not accepted in 2009, they were subsequently invited to participate in the newly created qualifying round of the 2013 World Baseball Classic.

== 2013 World Baseball Classic ==
Israel competed in the 2013 World Baseball Classic qualifier. The qualifying round was held in September, while the Major League Baseball season still in progress, therefore it could not feature major league players such as those who qualified to play for Team Israel.

The team competed in the September 2012 qualifier, in Jupiter, Florida against Spain, France, and South Africa. Israel competed in their first qualifying match for the 2013 tournament on 19 September 2012 and defeated South Africa by a score of 7–3. Nate Freiman had two home runs in the victory. Israel's second qualifying match was against Spain on 21 September 2012, which Israel won 4–2. Nate Freiman once again homered twice for Israel in the victory. Israel's third qualifying match was once again against Spain on 23 September 2012, and lost 9–7 in 10 innings. With the victory Israel was eliminated from the tournament and Spain moved on to the next round. Although Israel had won their first two games they were eliminated due to the tournaments modified double-elimination format. This meant that the final game was winner-take-all.

=== 2013 qualifier roster ===
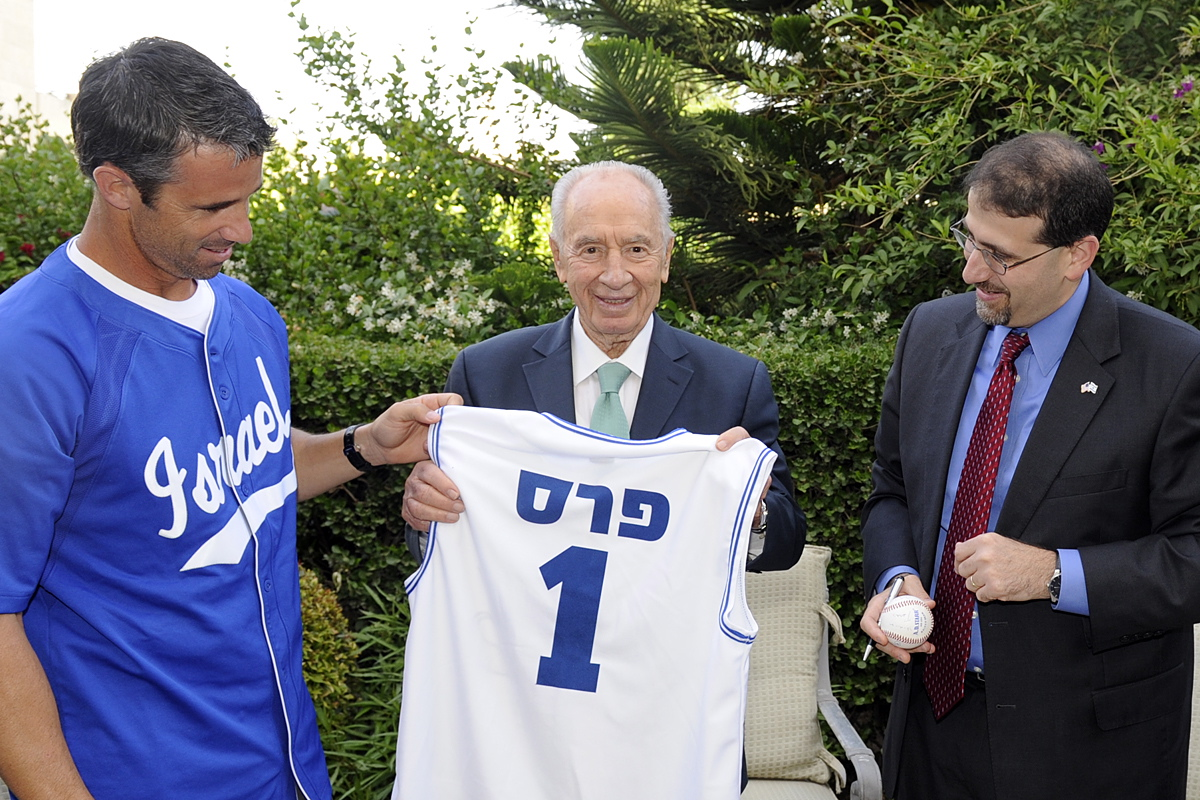
Israel national baseball team manager Brad Ausmus, Israeli president Shimon Peres and U.S. ambassador Daniel B. Shapiro (l-r)

The players who qualified to play on the Israeli team included major leaguers catcher Ryan Lavarnway, first baseman Ike Davis, second basemen Ian Kinsler and Josh Satin, third basemen Kevin Youkilis and Danny Valencia, outfielders Ryan Braun (whose father is Israeli), Sam Fuld, Ryan Kalish, and Gabe Kapler, and pitchers Jason Marquis, Scott Feldman, Craig Breslow, and John Grabow, as well as what were then recent major leaguers catcher Brad Ausmus and pitcher Scott Schoeneweis.

Kinsler said:

"Wow, I would be happy to play for Team Israel.... The truth is that if a proposal comes from Team USA to play for them, I will have a very difficult decision to make. Yuk [Kevin Youkilis], Braun [Ryan Braun], and I could make a fantastic team. I am sure that I'll talk it over with Yuk – we always laugh about things like this."

Outfielder Shawn Green, who retired in 2007, was also eligible inasmuch as he is Jewish, and said in early June 2011 that assuming it works out, it "would be an honor" and he "would love to" play for Israel in the Classic.

The qualifying round was held in September, while the Major League Baseball season was still in progress; therefore, during Qualifiers 1 and 2 it could not feature major league players such as the above ones who qualified to play for Team Israel. The lack of Major League players affected Israel far more than its opponents, none of which had players in the Major Leagues at the time. Kevin Youkilis announced that he would play for the team if it made it past the qualifying round of the 2013 World Baseball Classic.

The highest-level players involved in Qualifiers 1 and 2 were minor-league prospects. Team Israel included minor league pitchers Eric Berger (1–0) and Brett Lorin, first baseman Nate Freiman (.417; 4 HR in 12 AB), second baseman Josh Satin (.273), shortstops Jake Lemmerman and Ben Orloff, and outfielders Cody Decker, Adam Greenberg, Ben Guez, Joc Pederson (.308), and Robbie Widlansky. Also, retired former major league All Star Shawn Green played for Israel (.333).

In addition to Brad Ausmus as manager, the team's coaches included Shawn Green, Gabe Kapler, and Mark Loretta.

2013 World Baseball Classic qualifier roster

2013 Israel Baseball Team roster
Players		Coaches
Pitchers: 14 Eric Berger; 34 Richard Bleier; 27 David Colvin; 26 Jeremy Gould; 25 Jeff Kaplan; 36 David Kopp; 16 Alon Leichman; 22 Shlomo Lipetz; 10 Brett Lorin; 21 Max Perlman; 32 Dan Rothem; 12 Justin Schumer; 46 Jeff Urlaub; 40 Josh Zeid	Catchers: 37 Charlie Cutler; 19 Nick Rickles; Infielders: 34 Nate Freiman; 33 Casey Haerther; 7 Jake Lemmerman; 3 Jack Marder; 9 Ben Orloff; 2 Josh Satin; Outfielders: 6 Cody Decker; 1 Adam Greenberg; 24 Ben Guez; 31 Joc Pederson; 23 Robbie Widlansky; 15 Shawn Green (Designated Hitter)	Manager: 11 Brad Ausmus; Coaches: 5 Mark Loretta (Hitting); 30 Andrew Lorraine (Pitching); 8 Matt Martin (Coach); 14 Gabe Kapler (Coach); Nate Fish (Bullpen catcher)

=== 2013 qualifier results ===
Date	Local time	Road team	Score	Home team	Inn.	Venue	Game duration	Attendance	Boxscore
Sep 19, 2012	19:00	Israel	7–3	South Africa		Roger Dean Stadium	3:16	1,581	Boxscore
Sep 21, 2012	13:00	Israel	4–2	Spain		Roger Dean Stadium	2:43	814	Boxscore
Sep 23, 2012	17:00	Spain	9–7	Israel	10	Roger Dean Stadium	4:50	4,463	Boxscore

Israel 7, South Africa 3

September 19 19:00 at Roger Dean Stadium
Team	1	2	3	4	5	6	7	8	9	R	H	E
Israel	1	0	0	0	0	0	1	3	2	7	10	1
South Africa	0	0	0	0	0	0	0	0	3	3	3	2
WP: Eric Berger (1–0) LP: Dylan Unsworth (0–1); Home runs: ISR: Nate Freiman 2 (2); RSA: None; Attendance: 1,581 (23.0%); Umpires: HP − Chris Segal, 1B − Sean Barber, 2B − Trevor Grieve, 3B − Jens Waider; Boxscore

Israel 4, Spain 2

September 21 13:00 at Roger Dean Stadium
Team	1	2	3	4	5	6	7	8	9	R	H	E
Israel	0	0	0	0	0	2	0	2	0	4	7	1
Spain	0	0	0	0	0	1	0	0	1	2	8	2
WP: Justin Schumer (1–0) LP: Richard Salazar (0–1) Sv: Josh Zeid (1); Home runs: ISR: Nate Freiman 2 (4); ESP: None; Attendance: 814 (11.8%); Umpires: HP − Sean Barber, 1B − Chris Segal, 2B − Jens Waider, 3B − Jairo Mendoza; Boxscore

Spain 9, Israel 7

September 23 17:00 at Roger Dean Stadium
Team	1	2	3	4	5	6	7	8	9	10	R	H	E
Spain	0	0	1	3	1	0	1	1	0	2	9	15	0
Israel	2	0	1	3	0	0	0	1	0	0	7	7	0
WP: Iván Granados (1–0) LP: Josh Zeid (0–1); Attendance: 4,463 (65.0%); Umpires: HP − Chris Segal, 1B − Trevor Grieve, 2B − Jens Waider, 3B − Quinn Wolcott; Boxscore

Bracket

Preliminaries
–	Israel	7
–	South Africa	3
–	France	0
–	Spain	8
Lower round 1
L1	South Africa	5
L2	France	2

Semifinals
W1	Israel	4
W2	Spain	2
Lower final
W4	South Africa	3
L3	Spain	13

Qualifier
W3	Israel	7
W5	Spain	9

== 2017 World Baseball Classic ==
Israel competed in the 2017 World Baseball Classic, after winning the 4th qualifying round in September 2016. This marked the second time Israel competed at the World Baseball Classic qualifier, and its first time qualifying for the main tournament.

Israel's qualifiers took place in MCU Park, Brooklyn, New York, United States against Pakistan, Brazil, and Great Britain. Colorado Rockies coach Jerry Weinstein served as the team's manager. Israel swept all three games of the competition to qualify for the main tournament, first beating Great Britain and Brazil, and then defeating Great Britain 9–1 in the finals.

With the win, they advanced to play in South Korea, as the 16th and final team in the WBC. They were in Pool A, playing against South Korea, Taiwan, and the Netherlands.

=== 2017 qualifier roster ===
Team Israel for the 2016 qualifying competition was assembled by Peter Kurz (President of the Israel Association of Baseball), with an informal team of baseball scouts and experts of Jewish baseball, including Scott Barancik (Jewish Baseball News) and Ephraim Moxson and Shel Wallman (Jewish Sports Review).

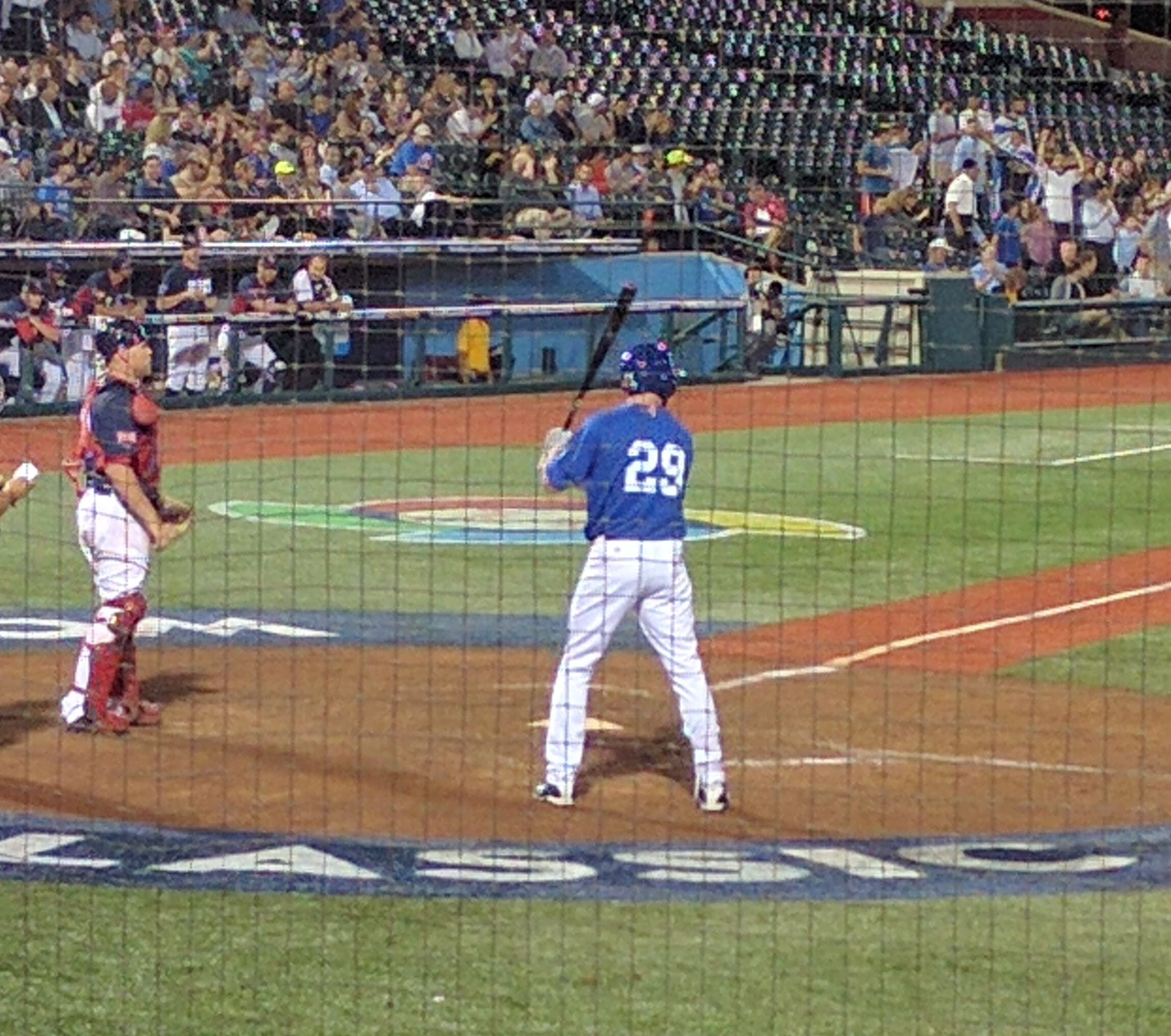
Ike Davis preparing to bat for Israel.

On August 15, 2016, it was announced that MLB veteran pitcher Craig Breslow would join the Team Israel pitching staff for the qualifiers. The official roster was released on August 26, 2016. Israel's roster included 20 MLB-affiliated minor leaguers, making up 86% of the team, more than any other team in the qualifiers even before including recent Major Leaguers Breslow (an 11-year MLB veteran), Ike Davis, Josh Satin, catcher Ryan Lavarnway, former 15-year MLB veteran All Star pitcher Jason Marquis, Cody Decker, Nate Freiman, and Josh Zeid. One of Israel's minor leaguers, Ty Kelly, had to withdraw from the qualifier after he was called up to the New York Mets. Additionally, 10 of the Israeli players had reached Triple-A.

The team's oldest player was pitcher Shlomo Lipetz, 37, who grew up in Israel and lives in New York. Lipetz is also the only player on the team with no current or past MLB affiliation. Team Israel's youngest player was pitcher Dean Kremer, 20, a Californian drafted by the Dodgers whose parents are Israeli expatriates.

2017 World Baseball Classic qualifier roster

Israel roster – 2017 World Baseball Classic Qualification
Players		Coaches
Pitchers: 8 Corey Baker; 27 Jeremy Bleich; 32 Craig Breslow; 24 Brad Goldberg; 23 Tyler Herron; 25 Alex Katz; 17 Dean Kremer; 31 Jared Lakind; 12 Shlomo Lipetz; 21 Jason Marquis; 44 Troy Neiman; 15 R.C. Orlan; 19 Ryan Sherriff; 6 Joey Wagman; 28 Josh Zeid	Catchers: 34 Charlie Cutler; 36 Ryan Lavarnway; 9 Nick Rickles; Infielders: 5 Scott Burcham; 29 Ike Davis; 14 Cody Decker; 20 Nate Freiman; 4 Mitch Glasser; 13 Josh Satin; Outfielders: 35 Zach Borenstein; 2 Blake Gailen; 11 Mike Meyers; 3 Rhett Wiseman	Manager: 1 Jerry Weinstein; Coaches: 22 Tom Gamboa (Bench coach); 30 Andrew Lorraine (Pitching coach); 18 Alon Leichman (Bullpen coach); 48 Jerry Narron (3B coach); 10 Nate Fish (1B coach); 7 Tal Erel (Bullpen catcher); 15 Justine Siegal (Mental skills coach)

=== 2017 qualifier results ===
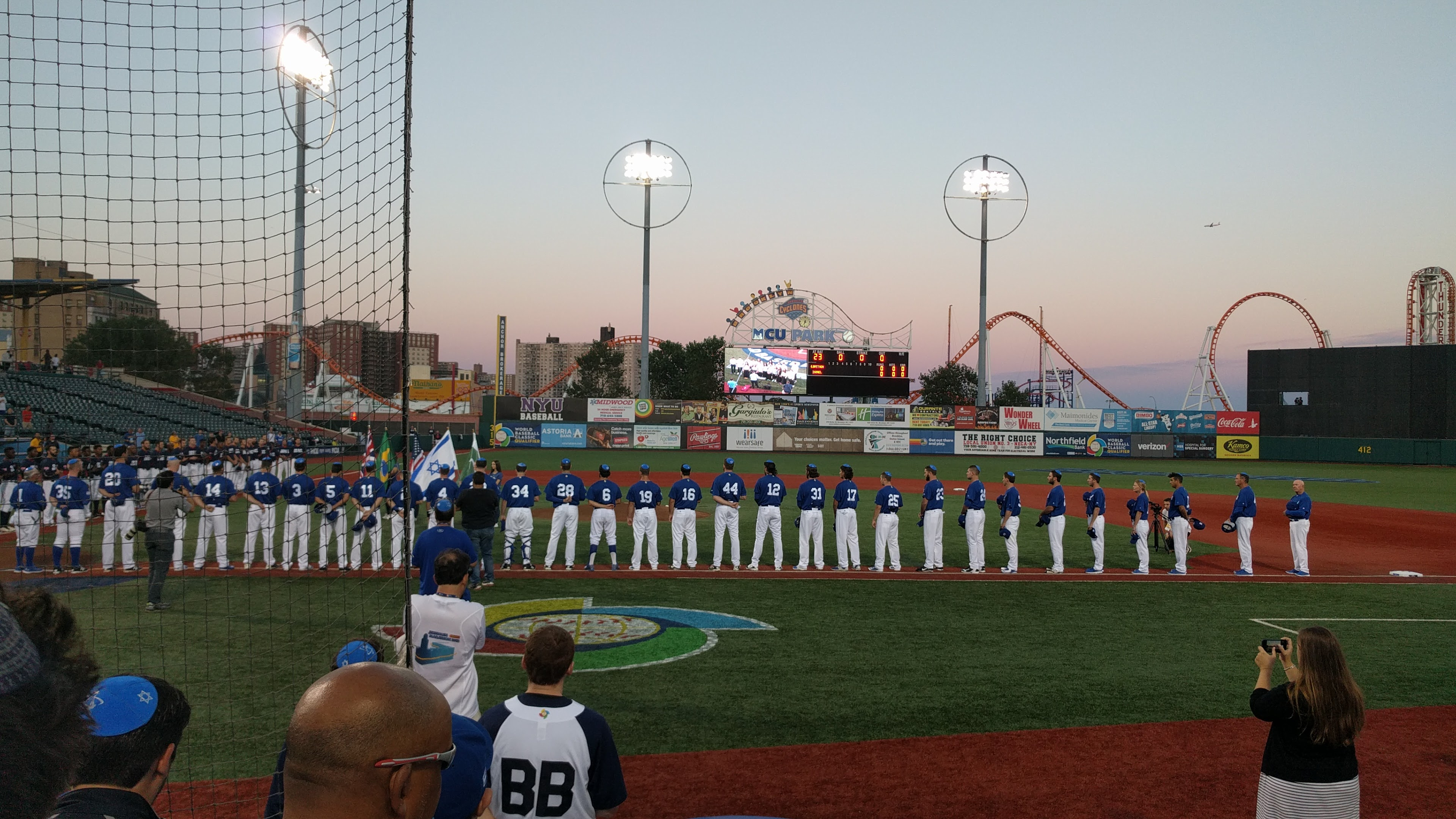
Team Israel wearing their kippot during Hatikvah before the game against Great Britain on September 22, 2016.

Israel, Pakistan, Brazil, and Great Britain played a modified double-elimination format. Israel's schedule was set in a way that they would play the afternoon game on Friday, under any circumstances, in order to avoid the need to play on Shabbat, and the Saturday night game, should Israel need to play, would start after Shabbat was over.

Israel beat Great Britain 5–2 in Game One, with RBIs from pinch-hitter/DH Ike Davis and third baseman Cody Decker. In addition, left fielder Rhett Wiseman singled and scored, right fielder Zach Borenstein had an RBI single, and catcher Ryan Lavarnway had three hits. Jason Marquis started and was removed after throwing 41 pitches in order to allow him to return later in the qualifiers. (WBC rules require four days rest after throwing at least 50 pitches.) Josh Zeid struck out six hitters in 3-2/3 innings of relief, and Craig Breslow got the win. Decker said: “I never played on a team with more than three Jews since Little League in Santa Monica.”

Israel beat Brazil 1–0 in Game Two, with Decker driving in DH Nate Freiman for the only run of the game. Freiman and shortstop Scott Burcham got the team's other hits. Corey Baker started and gave up one hit in five innings and was pulled after throwing 83 pitches, two fewer than the qualifying round’s single-game limit. Ryan Sherriff, Jared Lakind, and Jeremy Bleich pitched in relief, and Brad Goldberg picked up his second save.

Israel defeated Great Britain in the finals 9–1 on September 25, 2016. Starter Jason Marquis struck out five batters while pitching four perfect innings, and Josh Zeid pitched three shutout innings and was credited with the win. The pitching duo did not allow a hit through their 7 innings of play. Center fielder Blake Gailen broke the scoreless tie in the fifth inning with a two-run home run. Ryan Lavarnway and Cody Decker also homered for Israel.

Date	Local time	Road team	Score	Home team	Inn.	Venue	Game duration	Attendance	Boxscore
Sep 22, 2016	7:00	Great Britain	2-5	Israel	9	MCU Park	3:08	3,919	
Sep 23, 2016	12:00	Brazil	0-1	Israel	9	MCU Park	2:56	1,862	
Sep 25, 2016	6:00	Great Britain	1-9	Israel	9	MCU Park	2:44	2,019	

Israel 5, Great Britain 2

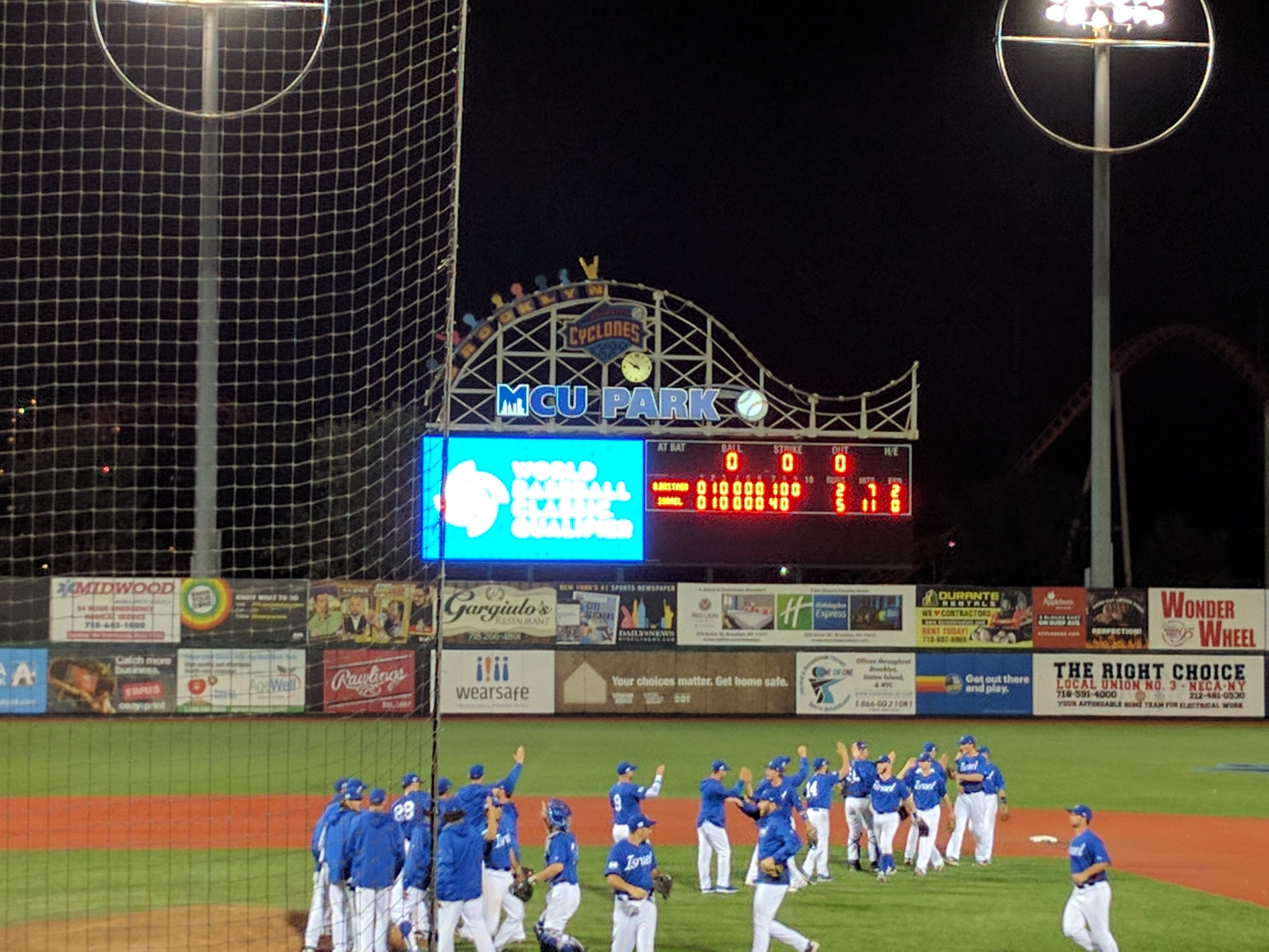
Team Israel celebrating on the field after defeating Great Britain on September 22, 2016.

September 22 19:00 at MCU Park
Team	1	2	3	4	5	6	7	8	9	R	H	E
Great Britain	0	1	0	0	0	0	1	0	0	2	7	2
Israel	0	1	0	0	0	0	4	0	X	5	11	0
WP: Craig Breslow (1–0) LP: Vaughan Harris (0–1) Sv: Brad Goldberg (1); Attendance: 3,919 (56.0%); Umpires: HP − Serge Makouchetev, 1B − Shane Livensparger, 2B − Andrew Higgins, 3B − Xu Bing; Boxscore

Israel 1, Brazil 0

September 23 12:00 at MCU Park
Team	1	2	3	4	5	6	7	8	9	R	H	E
Brazil	0	0	0	0	0	0	0	0	0	0	3	1
Israel	0	0	0	1	0	0	0	0	X	1	3	0
WP: Corey Baker (1–0) LP: Bo Takahashi (0–1) Sv: Brad Goldberg (2); Attendance: 1,862 (26.6%); Umpires: HP − Andrew Higgins, 1B − Shane Livensparger, 2B − Alberto Ruiz, 3B − Xu Bing; Boxscore

Israel 9, Great Britain 1

September 25 18:00 at MCU Park
Team	1	2	3	4	5	6	7	8	9	R	H	E
Great Britain	0	0	0	0	0	0	0	1	0	1	4	1
Israel	0	0	0	0	4	1	1	3	X	9	11	1
WP: Josh Zeid (1–0) LP: Spencer Kreisberg (0–1); Home runs: GBR: None; ISR: Blake Gailen (1), Ryan Lavarnway (1), Cody Decker (1); Attendance: 2,016 (28.8%); Umpires: HP − Alberto Ruiz, 1B − Travis Eggert, 2B − Andrew Higgins, 3B − Serge Makouchetev; Boxscore

Bracket

Preliminaries
–	Pakistan	0
–	Brazil	10
–	Great Britain	2
–	Israel	5
Lower round 1
L1	Pakistan	0
L2	Great Britain	14

Semifinals
W1	Brazil	0
W2	Israel	1
Lower final
W4	Great Britain	4
L3	Brazil	3

Qualifier
W3	Israel	9
W5	Great Britain	1

=== 2017 main World Baseball Classic roster ===
Current major leaguers who were not able to play in September 2016 because they were playing in the majors, but who would be eligible to play for Team Israel in March 2017, included former All Stars outfielder Ryan Braun (Milwaukee Brewers; Israeli father), second basemen Ian Kinsler (Detroit Tigers) and Jason Kipnis (Cleveland Indians), and center fielder Joc Pederson (Los Angeles Dodgers). Other major leaguers who would be eligible to play for Team Israel included outfielder Kevin Pillar (Toronto Blue Jays), third baseman/outfielder/first baseman Danny Valencia (Oakland A’s), shortstop/third baseman Alex Bregman (Houston Astros), and pitchers Scott Feldman (Blue Jays), Richard Bleier (New York Yankees), and Jon Moscot (Cincinnati Reds; on the DL at the end of 2016 season).

In November 2016 it was announced that Jerry Weinstein would return as head coach. His coaching staff included Tom Gamboa as bench coach, Jerry Narron as third base coach, Nate Fish as first base coach, Andrew Lorraine as pitching coach, Tal Erel as bullpen catcher, and Alon Leichman as bullpen coach. Additional team staff included Barry Weinberg as trainer, Justine Siegal as mental skills coach, and Dan Rootenberg with Yoni Rosenblatt as the strength/conditioning coaches.

In January 2017 ten players with MLB affiliations were announced as Team Israel roster members, and traveled to Israel to participate in various events. The players included Ike Davis, Sam Fuld, Ryan Lavarnway, Ty Kelly, Corey Baker, Jeremy Bleich, Jon Moscot (did not play due to arm injury), Danny Valencia, and Cody Decker. On January 12, Alex Katz officially confirmed his spot, as did Nick Rickels, on their respective Twitter accounts. It was later announced that additional players include Tyler Krieger, Dean Kremer, Jake Kalish, Blake Gailen, RC Orlan, Joey Wagman, Scott Burcham, and Gabe Cramer. Not one of its players was currently on the 40-man roster of a major-league team, though 10 of Team Israel's players had Major League experience and most of the others had minor league experience. For some of the ballplayers, including Ike Davis, Nate Freiman, Nick Rickles, and Josh Zeid, the 2017 WBC was their third appearance with Team Israel. Although Scott Feldman was originally announced as part of the roster, he later withdrew.

Team Israel was composed of players who overall have had a high level of education. Of the 36 players on the team's active roster or in its designated pitcher pool, 32 had attended university. Among those 32, two players attended Yale University, three went to Stanford University, two attended Duke University, two went to St. John's University, and seven attended a California State school. In addition, manager Jerry Weinstein had a UCLA master's degree in physical education. In contrast, as of 2012 a total of 4.3% of major league ballplayers had college degrees, and as of the prior year a total of 38% had played in college.

Closer Brad Goldberg left spring training with the Chicago White Sox, and reliever Jared Lakind left the Pittsburgh Pirates, to join Team Israel in the second round of the 2017 World Baseball Classic, in March 2017 in Japan.

Israel roster – 2017 World Baseball Classic
Players		Coaches
Pitchers: 19 Dylan Axelrod; 8 Corey Baker; 27 Jeremy Bleich; 41 Danny Burawa; 24 Brad Goldberg; 23 Tyler Herron; 35 Jake Kalish; 25 Alex Katz; 17 Dean Kremer; 26 Jared Lakind; 21 Jason Marquis; 44 Troy Neiman; 15 R. C. Orlan; 32 Zack Thornton; 6 Joey Wagman; 28 Josh Zeid	Catchers: 36 Ryan Lavarnway; 9 Nick Rickles; Infielders: 5 Scott Burcham; 29 Ike Davis; 14 Cody Decker; 20 Nate Freiman; 56 Ty Kelly; 22 Tyler Krieger; Outfielders: 35 Zach Borenstein; 23 Sam Fuld; 2 Blake Gailen; 11 Mike Meyers	Manager: 1 Jerry Weinstein; Coaches: 48 Pat Doyle (Bench coach); 30 Andrew Lorraine (Pitching coach); 18 Alon Leichman (Bullpen coach); 22 Tom Gamboa (3B coach); 10 Nate Fish (1B coach); 7 Tal Erel (Bullpen catcher)

=== Mascot: Mensch on the Bench ===
Cody Decker brought the team's mascot with him to Asia from the United States for the WBC. The mascot is "Mensch on the Bench", a five-foot-tall plush stuffed toy that looks a bit like a rabbi or Hasidic Jew with a long beard and mustache who is wearing a tallis and holding a candle. "Mensch", in Yiddish, means a person of integrity or honor.

Decker said he "tried getting him a first-class ticket. But that didn’t fly, so he was put in a duffel bag and checked." The mascot proved to be a big hit, and the team takes him everywhere. He has his own locker, sits on Team Israel's bench in the dugout during every game, and sat alongside Decker at a press conference in South Korea. Decker said:

"He’s a mascot, he’s a friend, he’s a teammate, he’s a borderline deity to our team.... He brings a lot to the table.... Every team needs their Jobu. He was ours. He had his own locker, and we even gave him offerings: Manischewitz, gelt, and gefilte fish... He is everywhere and nowhere all at once. His actual location is irrelevant because he exists in higher metaphysical planes. But he’s always near."

Manager Jerry Weinstein said: "He’s on the team. Everybody brings something to the team, and certainly The Mensch is a unifying factor for the ball club." Pitcher Gabe Cramer said: "The Mensch on the Bench is ... a symbol we can rally around as a team. We are proud to be Jewish, but we know how to make and take a joke, something Jews have a long history of doing. The Mensch is a great way to have fun in the dugout while reminding us of why we’re here and who we’re representing."

=== 2017 main World Baseball Classic results ===
Prior to the start of the 2017 World Baseball Classic, ESPN considered Team Israel, ranked 41st in the world, to be the biggest underdog in the tournament, referring to it as the "Jamaican bobsled team of the WBC". Israel was the last of the 16 teams to qualify, was the only participant not in the top 20 in the world rankings, and not one of its players was currently on the 40-man roster of a major-league team (though most of Team Israel's players had Major League or minor league experience). In addition, ESPN ranked them 14 out of 16 in their power rankings. Israel's odds to win the WBC were 200–1, before the tournament began.

Following the World Baseball Classic, Josh Zeid was named to the All-WBC team.

==== Round 1 – Pool A ====
In their first game Israel defeated the Pool A favorite and 2009 silver medalist South Korea, ranked # 3 in the world, in 10 innings by a score of 2–1. Israel's winning pitcher Josh Zeid said the win was the pinnacle of his career: "This has to be it. This has to be the top, top win as a team, I think in my career. I’ve been lucky enough to be part of a couple of championships in the lower levels in the minor leagues and in high school, but nothing compares to this stage. Israel's third baseman Ty Kelly tweeted: "Definitely the most stressful game I’ve ever been a part of. But it was worth it." Israel's catcher Ryan Lavarnway noted after the win: "two generations ago, the way that this team was put together would have meant that we were being killed... It means a lot more than that we're here."

One day later, against Chinese Taipei, ranked # 4 in the world, Israel won again, this time by the score of 15–7. Israel's 15 runs were the most Taiwan had ever given up in a game in World Baseball Classic play. Taiwan manager Kuo Tai-yuan said of Israel: "That's a very scary team."

The following day, Chinese Taipei lost to the Netherlands, thus guaranteeing Team Israel a spot in the second round as it had one of the top two records in the pool. The second round will be Pool E in Tokyo, Japan, later in March 2017. It also automatically qualified for the 2021 World Baseball Classic.

Later that week, Israel went on to beat the Netherlands, ranked # 9 in the world and including a number of prominent Major Leaguers including Didi Gregorius, Xander Bogaerts, and Jonathan Schoop, 4–2 as Josh Zeid garnered his second save. Israel worked in nine pitchers during the game. In what NBC reported was thought to be the tallest batter-pitcher matchup in baseball history, the Dutch team’s 7-foot-1-inch (2.16 m) pitcher Loek van Mil walked Israel's 6-foot-8-inch (2.03 m) first baseman Nate Freiman.

Team Israel swept Pool A, 3–0, finishing atop the four-team pool, and outscoring its opponents 21–10. Israel became the first baseball team to go undefeated in the first round of the WBC’s main draw after entering the main draw by winning in a qualifying round. Following the game Team Israel's catcher, Ryan Lavarnway, was named Pool A MVP, after going 5-for-9 (.556/.692/.889), with four walks, a home run, and three RBIs.

Israeli Prime Minister Benjamin Netanyahu tweeted congratulations to the team for its "amazing journey," and the Israel Defence Forces tweeted its support. At the same time, many were unaware Israel was competing, including Minister of Sports Miri Regev.

Date	Local time	Road team	Score	Home team	Inn.	Venue	Game duration	Attendance	Boxscore
Mar 6, 2017	19:00	Israel	2 – 1	South Korea	10	Gocheok Sky Dome	4:11	15,470	
Mar 7, 2017	12:30	Israel	15 – 7	Chinese Taipei	9	Gocheok Sky Dome	3:54	3,287	
Mar 9, 2017	12:30	Israel	4–2	Netherlands	9	Gocheok Sky Dome	3:12	2,739	

Standings

Pos	Team	Pld	W	L	RF	RA	RD	PCT	GB	Qualification
1	Israel	3	3	0	21	10	+11	1.000	—	Advance to second round
2	Netherlands	3	2	1	13	9	+4	.667	1	Advance to second round
3	South Korea (H)	3	1	2	12	15	−3	.333	2	
4	Chinese Taipei	3	0	3	20	32	−12	.000	3	

Rules for classification: Tiebreakers
(H) Hosts
Israel 2, South Korea 1 (F10)

March 6 18:30 at Gocheok Sky Dome
Team	1	2	3	4	5	6	7	8	9	10	R	H	E
Israel	0	1	0	0	0	0	0	0	0	1	2	8	0
South Korea	0	0	0	0	1	0	0	0	0	0	1	7	0
WP: Josh Zeid (1−0) LP: Chang-yong Lim (0−1); Attendance: 15,470 (91.0%); Umpires: HP − Brian Knight, 1B − Frantisek Pribyl, 2B − Brett Robson, 3B − D. J. Reyburn; Boxscore

Israel 15, Chinese Taipei 7

March 7 12:00 at Gocheok Sky Dome
Team	1	2	3	4	5	6	7	8	9	R	H	E
Israel	4	0	2	0	0	0	5	1	3	15	20	1
Chinese Taipei	0	0	0	0	0	3	0	0	4	7	12	2
WP: Corey Baker (1−0) LP: Chun-lin Kuo (0−1); Home runs: ISR: Ryan Lavarnway (1), Nate Freiman (1); TPE: None; Attendance: 3,287 (19.3%); Umpires: HP − Chikara Tsugawa, 1B − Ted Barrett, 2B − Brian Knight, 3B − Frantisek Pribyl; Boxscore

Israel 4, Netherlands 2

March 9 12:00 at Gocheok Sky Dome
Team	1	2	3	4	5	6	7	8	9	R	H	E
Netherlands	0	0	1	0	0	0	0	1	0	2	5	1
Israel	3	0	0	0	0	1	0	0	x	4	8	2
WP: Jason Marquis (1−0) LP: Rob Cordemans(0−1) Sv: Josh Zeid (1−0); Home runs: NED: 0 ISR: 0 Umpires: HP − Brian Knight, 1B − Chikara Tsugawa, 2B − Ted Barrett, 3B − Frantisek Pribyl https://www.worldbaseballclassic.com/gameday/netherlands-vs-israel/2017/03/08/486908?#game=486908,game_state=final Boxscore

==== Round 2 – Pool E ====
Date	Local time	Road team	Score	Home team	Inn.	Venue	Game duration	Attendance	Boxscore
Mar 12, 2017	12:00	Cuba	1–4	Israel		Tokyo Dome	3:14	43,153	
Mar 13, 2017	19:00	Netherlands	12–2	Israel		Tokyo Dome	3:04	5,017	
Mar 15, 2017	19:00	Israel	3–8	Japan		Tokyo Dome	3:28	43,157	

Right-handed relief pitcher Brad Goldberg joined Team Israel in the second round of the World Baseball Classic in Japan. He had pitched in four games for the Chicago White Sox in spring training, and thrown 4.2 scoreless innings of relief. In addition, left-handed pitcher Jared Lakind joined the team.

Writing for mlb.com, reporter Anthony Castrovince opined: "When Team Israel and magnetic mascot "Mensch on a Bench" surprisingly get a shot at the semifinals, we all get a little verklempt."

In the first game of the second round, Israel beat Cuba (5th-ranked in the world) by a score of 4-1. After falling behind 1-0 in the 2nd inning, Israel came from behind with one run in the 4th, two runs in the 6th, and one more in the 8th. Starter Jason Marquis (in 5.2 innings on three days' rest) and three Team Israel relief pitchers (including Brad Goldberg and Josh Zeid, who both threw 96 mph fastballs) kept Team Cuba to five hits and one run, a homer by Cuban star Alfredo Despaigne who became the all-time World Baseball Classic home run leader. Catcher Ryan Lavarnway had two hits for Israel.

"It feels like the World Series," said Team Israel Manager Jerry Weinstein, "but only bigger."

In a rematch of their Pool A game in which Israel prevailed, the Netherlands defeated Israel 12–2 on March 13, giving Israel their first loss of the tournament. Undefeated two-time WBC champion Team Japan then beat Team Israel, 8–3.

Israel finished in third place in Pool E with a 1–2 record, and 4–2 overall in the tournament. Israel will not have to qualify for the 2021 World Baseball Classic, based on its 2017 performance. USA Today opined that the team's performance might inspire other American Jewish major leaguers to play for Team Israel at the 2021 WBC. Following the conclusion of the World Baseball Classic, Zeid was named to the 2017 All-World Baseball Classic team. First baseman Nate Freiman wrote an article describing his experiences on Team Israel, entitled "The Mensches of March."

Standings

Pos	Team	Pld	W	L	RF	RA	RD	PCT	GB	Qualification
1	Japan (H)	3	3	0	24	14	+10	1.000	—	Advance to championship round
2	Netherlands	3	2	1	32	11	+21	.667	1	Advance to championship round
3	Israel	3	1	2	9	21	−12	.333	2	
4	Cuba	3	0	3	7	26	−19	.000	3	

Rules for classification: Tiebreakers
(H) Hosts
Cuba 1, Israel 4

March 12 12:00 at Tokyo Dome
Team	1	2	3	4	5	6	7	8	9	R	H	E
Cuba	0	1	0	0	0	0	0	0	0	1	5	1
Israel	0	0	0	1	0	2	0	1	X	4	5	0
WP: Zack Thornton (1−0) LP: Yoanni Yera (0−1) Sv: Josh Zeid (1); Home runs: CUB: Alfredo Despaigne (1); ISR: None; Attendance: 43,153 (93.8%); Umpires: HP − Todd Tichenor, 1B − Cory Blaser, 2B − Trevor Grieve, 3B − Jens Waider; Boxscore

Netherlands 12, Israel 2

March 13, 19:00 at Tokyo Dome (F/8)
Team	1	2	3	4	5	6	7	8	9	R	H	E
Netherlands	0	2	4	4	0	0	0	2	X	12	15	1
Israel	0	0	0	1	0	0	1	0	X	2	8	0
WP: Jair Jurrjens (1−0) LP: Corey Baker (0−1); Home runs: NED: Didi Gregorius (1); ISR: Nate Freiman (1); Attendance: 5,017 (10.9%); Umpires: HP − Cory Blaser, 1B − Félix Tejada, 2B − Todd Tichenor, 3B − Jens Waider; Notes: Completed early due to 10–run mercy rule after 8 innings. Boxscore

Japan 8, Israel 3

March 15, 19:00 at Tokyo Dome
Team	1	2	3	4	5	6	7	8	9	R	H	E
Israel	0	0	0	0	0	0	0	0	3	3	5	0
Japan	0	0	0	0	0	5	0	3	X	8	13	1
WP: Yoshihisa Hirano (1−0) LP: Dylan Axelrod (0−1); Home runs: ISR: None; JPN: Yoshitomo Tsutsugoh (1); Attendance: 43,179 (93.9%); Umpires: HP − Cory Blaser, 1B − Larry Vanover, 2B − Trevor Grieve, 3B − Félix Tejada; Boxscore

=== Heading Home: The Tale of Team Israel ===
In June 2018 a documentary was released entitled Heading Home: The Tale of Team Israel which dealt with Israel at the 2017 World Baseball Classic.

== 2023 World Baseball Classic ==
Team Israel competed in the 2023 World Baseball Classic in March 12–15, 2023. It played in Miami, Florida. Israel faced Team Puerto Rico, Team Dominican Republic, Team Venezuela, and Team Nicaragua.

American-Israeli Ian Kinsler, a former Major League All Star and two-time Gold Glove winner, and Israeli Olympian, managed the team. Among the players who have committed to play for the team are All Star outfielder Joc Pederson, Gold Glove outfielder Harrison Bader, outfielder Kevin Pillar, catcher Garrett Stubbs, and American-Israelis catcher Ryan Lavarnway and infielder Ty Kelly. Pitchers on the team included Israeli-American Dean Kremer, Eli Morgan, Richard Bleier, Robert Stock, Jake Bird, and American-Israelis Jake Fishman, Zack Weiss, and Bubby Rossman, while Scott Effross was slated to be on the team but injured his arm.

Others who may possibly join Team Israel include All Star pitcher Max Fried, pitcher Noah Davis, pitcher Kenny Rosenberg, and outfielder Mike Moustakas. Third baseman All Star Alex Bregman has chosen not to play in the WBC, first baseman Rowdy Tellez chose to play for Team Mexico, and Adam Ottavino chose to play for Team Italy.

Brad Ausmus was one of the team's coaches. He is a former Team Israel manager, has managed in the major leagues for five years, and during his 18-year playing career won three Gold Glove Awards for his defense. Kevin Youkilis was the team's hitting coach. In his 10-year major league career, he won two World Series titles with the Boston Red Sox, was a three-time All Star, and won a Gold Glove Award. Jerry Narron, who in his 30-year career has been a manager or coach with eight different major league teams and been the third base coach for Team Israel at the 2017 World Baseball Classic qualifier, also served as a coach for the team. On March 13 Puerto Rico won 10–0 over Israel while Israel never got a base runner. This was the first perfect game in wbc history.

== See also ==
- List of Jewish baseball players
- Sport in Israel
- Baseball in Israel
- Israel at the European Baseball Championship
