= Gabe Cramer =

Israeli-Canadian-American baseball player

Gabriel Cramer
- Pitcher
- Born: November 1, 1994 (age 31); Santa Rosa, California, U.S.
- Bats: Right Throws: Right
- Stats at Baseball Reference

Gabriel Isaac Cramer (born November 1, 1994) is an Israeli-Canadian-American former professional baseball right-handed pitcher. He throws a 99 mph fastball. He plays for the Israel National Baseball Team.

As a high school player Cramer was Rawlings First Team All-California in 2012. He pitched for Stanford University, and after his junior year in 2015 was signed by the Royals.

Cramer pitched for Team Israel at the 2017 World Baseball Classic. In October 2018, he became an Israeli citizen. He pitched for Israel at the 2019 European Baseball Championship. He also pitched for the team at the Africa/Europe 2020 Olympic Qualification tournament in Italy in September 2019, which Israel won to qualify to play baseball at the 2020 Summer Olympics in Tokyo.

== Early and personal life ==
Cramer was born in Santa Rosa, California, to Corky Cramer and Paige Sobel. His parents had moved from Toronto, Ontario, to Santa Rosa in 1992. He is Jewish, and his family is a member of Congregation Shomrei Torah in Santa Rosa, where he and his brother Jake attended Hebrew school and had their bar mitzvahs. In October 2018 he became an Israeli citizen, partly to help Israel’s baseball team make the 2020 Olympics. As of December 2019 he was working in New York City mentoring students at a college application consulting firm, as he trained for the Olympics.

== High school ==
He attended Santa Rosa High School (2012). There, Cramer was a four-year varsity starter, 2011 Underclass All-America third team, 2011 All-North Bay League pitcher, led the North Bay League in strikeouts in 2011, was 2012 Santa Rosa High Scholar Athlete of the Year, 2012 North Bay League Rotary Scholar-Athlete, and was named Rawlings first team all-California region in 2012.

In his senior season, Cramer suffered a torn ulnar collateral ligament, or UCL, and had "Tommy John surgery" (ulnar collateral ligament reconstruction) in which the torn ligament was replaced and reinforced by another ligament from his body. Cramer didn't pitch competitively for over a year, as he rehabilitated his arm.

== College ==
Cramer then attended Stanford University, where he majored in Science, Technology and Society. He didn't play at all his freshman year for the Stanford Cardinal baseball team, due to his Tommy John surgery, and in 2014 he made only two appearances.

In 2015 in 21 appearances Cramer tied for second on the team with three saves, as he kept opponents to a .257 batting average. He was named to the 2015 Pac-12 Conference Baseball All-Academic First Team. He mainly threw a low-90s fastball, a changeup, and a curveball. During the summer of 2014 he pitched for the Bellingham Bells of the West Coast League, and during the summer of 2015 he pitched for the Yarmouth-Dennis Red Sox of the Cape Cod League. In the offseason of the Fall of 2016, he completed his degree.

== Minor leagues ==
Cramer was signed by the Royals in 2015, following his junior year at Stanford University, as a free agent. He began his professional career in 2015, in the middle of the season with the Arizona Royals of the Rookie Arizona League and the Burlington Royals of the Rookie Appalachian League.

In 2016, Cramer pitched for the Lexington Legends of the Single-A South Atlantic League, and in June of that year he was the team's Pitcher of the Month. For the season, he was 3-2 with a 4.12 ERA, and in 43 2/3 innings he gave up 38 hits and had 57 strikeouts, averaging 11.75 strikeouts per 9 innings. He throws a 97 mph fastball.

In 2017, Cramer pitched for the Wilmington Blue Rocks of the High-A Carolina League. He was 1-0 with a 1.98 ERA, and had 2 walks and 27 strikeouts in 13 2/3 innings, averaging 17.78 strikeouts per 9 innings. He spent 2018 on the disabled list with a torn rotator cuff, and was released by the Royals organization on November 1, 2018.

== Team Israel ==
Cramer pitched for Team Israel at the 2017 World Baseball Classic in March 2017. In one relief appearance he pitched one scoreless inning.

Cramer competed on the Israel national baseball team for qualification for the 2020 Olympics. He started one game and pitched in relief a second game as the team played in the 2019 European Baseball Championship - B-Pool in early July 2019 in Blagoevgrad, Bulgaria, winning all of its games and advancing to the playoffs against Team Lithuania in the 2019 Playoff Series at the end of July 2019 for the last qualifying spot for the 2019 European Baseball Championship. He was 1-0 with a 0.00 ERA, as in 6 innings he gave up one hit, two walks, and struck out 7 batters.

He pitched for Israel at the 2019 European Baseball Championship, starting one game and pitching two innings in which he gave up two earned runs. He also pitched for the team at the Africa/Europe 2020 Olympic Qualification tournament in Italy in September 2019, which Israel won to qualify to play baseball at the 2020 Summer Olympics in Tokyo. In the tournament he was 0-0 with a 0.00 ERA over 3.2 innings.

== See also ==
- List of baseball players who underwent Tommy John surgery
