= Brad Goldberg =

American baseball player (born 1990)

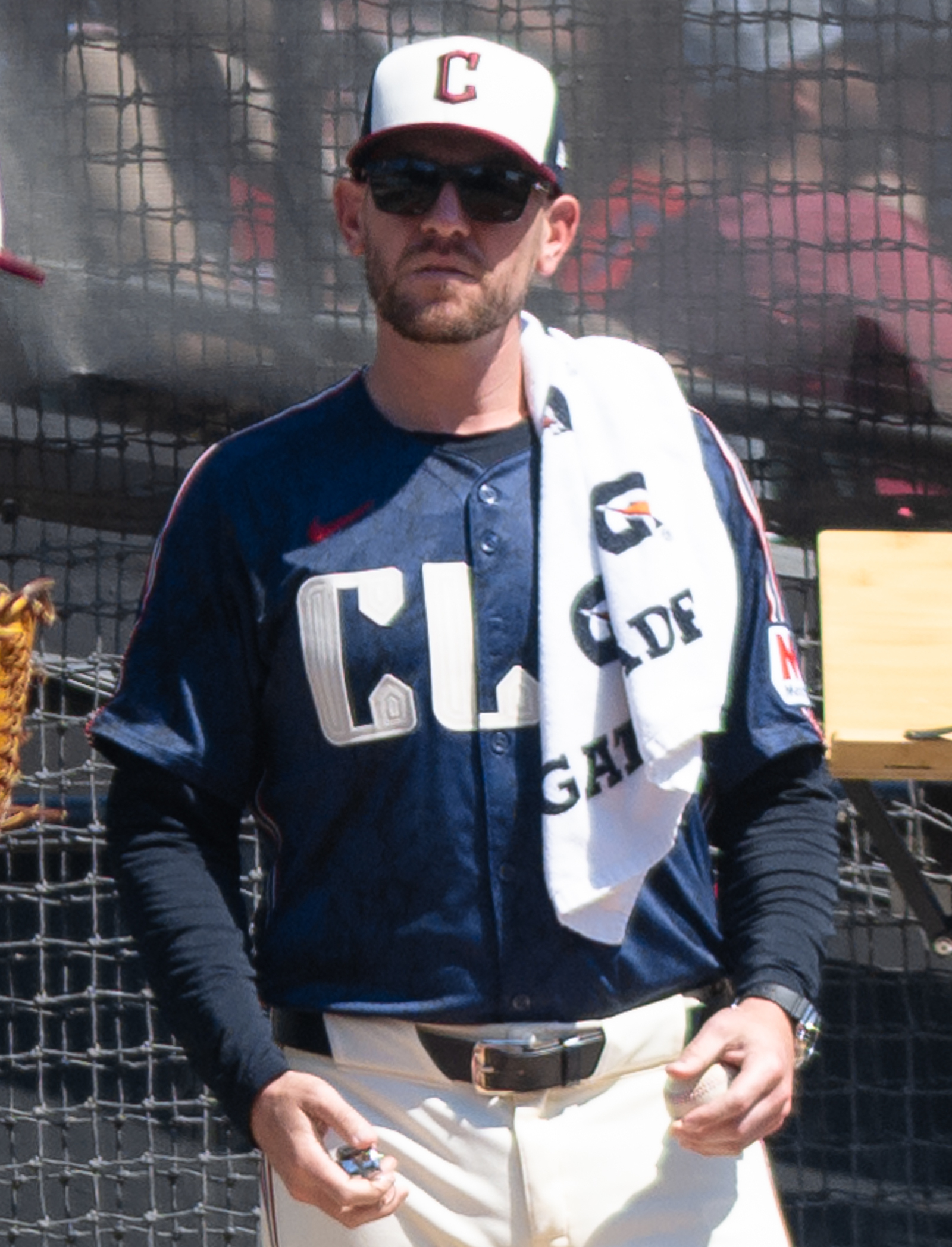
- Goldberg with the Cleveland Guardians in 2024

Cleveland Guardians – No. 81
- Pitcher / Coach
- Born: February 21, 1990 (age 36); Cleveland, Ohio, U.S.
- Batted: Right Threw: Right

MLB debut
- June 3, 2017, for the Chicago White Sox

Last MLB appearance
- August 21, 2017, for the Chicago White Sox

MLB statistics
- Win–loss record: 0–0
- Earned run average: 8.25
- Strikeouts: 3
- Stats at Baseball Reference

Teams
- As player: Chicago White Sox (2017); As coach: Cleveland Guardians (2022–present)

Bradley Andrew Goldberg (born February 21, 1990) is an American former professional baseball pitcher, and current assistant pitching coach for the Cleveland Guardians of Major League Baseball (MLB). He played in MLB for the Chicago White Sox.

In high school, Goldberg was a 2008 preseason Baseball America All-American, 2008 First Team All-Ohio, and the 2008 MVP of the Chagrin Valley Conference. In college in 2013, his senior year at Ohio State University, he was an All-Big Ten third-team selection. Selected by the Chicago White Sox in the 10th round of the 2013 MLB draft, that year Baseball America named him "Closest To The Majors" (with Tyler Danish) and "Best Fastball in the White Sox draft class". In 2016, he was an International League All Star with the Charlotte Knights in Triple-A. His fastball reaches 99 mph.

Goldberg pitched for Israel at the 2017 World Baseball Classic (WBC) qualifier, saving Israel's first two games. He left spring training with the Chicago White Sox to join and pitch for Israel in the second round of the 2017 WBC in Japan, in March 2017.

Was named pitching coach for Team Israel in WBC in 2026

== Early and personal life ==
Goldberg was born in Cleveland, Ohio, to Marla Goldberg and Bryan Goldberg, lives in Beachwood, Ohio, and is Jewish. He has two younger twin brothers, Rob and Todd. He went to Hebrew school and had his bar mitzvah at Anshe Chesed Fairmount Temple in Beachwood. Goldberg graduated from Beachwood High School.

== Amateur career ==
Goldberg attended Beachwood High School in Beachwood, Ohio, a suburb of Cleveland, graduating in 2008. Playing baseball for the school, he was 5–1 with a school record 64 strikeouts as a junior, and 9–2 with a 1.64 earned run average and 102 strikeouts as a senior; that season he also batted .450 with 35 RBIs.

He was 2008 First Team All-Ohio, was All-Chagrin Valley Conference all four years, and as a senior Goldberg was the 2008 Most Valuable Player of the Chagrin Valley Conference. He was also a 2008 preseason All-American by Baseball America and Under Armour, a two-time All-Sun Press Southeast Pitcher, and a Cleveland Plain Dealer Player of the Week in 2006. He was named to the Beachwood Hall of Fame. Steve Baraona, who coached Goldberg at Beachwood High School, believes Goldberg is the first Beachwood player to be picked in the MLB draft. His catcher had a major impact on his high school career, Tyler Margolin. Margolin caught a no hitter for Goldberg in 2006.

Goldberg enrolled at Coastal Carolina University in Conway, South Carolina, to play college baseball for the Coastal Carolina Chanticleers, and initially majored in Sports Management. He played for Coastal Carolina in 2009 and 2010, making 18 appearances (17 in relief) in those two seasons. In the summer of 2009 he played college summer baseball for the North Coast Knights, was ranked the No. 6 prospect in the Prospect League, and was named to the league's All Star team.

Goldberg transferred to Ohio State University, to play for Ohio State Buckeyes, switching his major to Sociology. Goldberg sat out the 2011 season in accordance with transfer "redshirt" rules, but also missed the 2012 season because most of his credits did not transfer, rendering him academically ineligible.

Goldberg pitched for the Buckeyes as a starter in 2013, and was 6–1 with a 2.99 earned run average in 15 starts. He was an All-Big Ten third-team selection, and was twice named Big Ten Pitcher of the Week. In college, he threw his fastball in the mid-90s, relied heavily on a sinking fastball, had a very good slider in the 82-84 mph range, and threw a 76-78 mph curveball.

== Professional career ==
=== Chicago White Sox ===
Goldberg was selected by the Chicago White Sox in the 10th round (303rd overall) of the 2013 MLB draft. White Sox assistant scouting director Nick Hostetler, who saw Goldberg in college, said: "A big, strong power-arm guy, with a live fastball. He's going to be a guy who can flash a breaking ball every now and then. I loved ... the competitiveness." When he was drafted, Goldberg was still one semester and an internship short of earning his college degree.

In 2013, Goldberg was 3–0 with a 1.54 ERA and three saves, and averaged 12.6 strikeouts per 9 IP, in 14 relief appearances with the Advanced rookie-level Great Falls Voyagers of the Pioneer League, Single-A Kannapolis Intimidators of the South Atlantic League, and High-A Winston-Salem Dash of the Carolina League. Baseball America named him "Closest To The Majors" (with Tyler Danish) and "Best Fastball in the White Sox draft class".

In early 2014 White Sox assistant general manager Buddy Bell said of Goldberg: "We like his arm. He's got some sink. Big, [Curt] Schilling-type looking body." That season, Goldberg was 4–4 with a 5.23 ERA with Winston-Salem, as he pitched in 35 games, including 7 starts.

In 2015, pitching for the Winston-Salem Dash, Goldberg was 1–4 in 39 games with a 2.97 ERA, and 11 saves (tied for 4th in the league) in 12 opportunities, and struck out 58 batters in 57 2/3 innings, all in relief. In the Fall of 2015, Goldberg finished his coursework for his college degree, and graduated in December with an Ohio State University Sociology degree.

Goldberg began the 2016 season with the Birmingham Barons of the Double-A Southern League, for whom he recorded a 1.50 ERA with seven strikeouts, and was later promoted to the Charlotte Knights of the Triple-A International League, for whom he was 3–5 with a 2.84 ERA and 10 saves (a team high) in 11 opportunities as the team's closer across 43 relief appearances. He was Charlotte's lone 2016 mid-season International League All Star. His fastball was reaching 99 mph. The White Sox added Goldberg to their 40-man roster after the season, to protect him from the Rule 5 draft.

In 2017, Goldberg threw the most innings in spring training for the White Sox without allowing a run: 4 2/3 innings. With Triple-A Charlotte, his fastball touched 99 mph, he threw a heavy cutter or two-seam fastball in the low 90s, his slider was in the mid-to-upper 80s range, and he threw a changeup. Pitching for Charlotte in 2017, Goldberg was 3–2 with a 3.35 ERA, five saves, and 47 strikeouts over 40 1/3 innings.

On June 3, 2017, Goldberg was promoted to the major leagues for the first time; to that point he had registered a 2–1 record and 1.99 ERA with four saves and 22 strikeouts over 17 games with the Charlotte. He made his major league debut that day, giving up four runs in 1/3 of an inning, and was sent back down to Charlotte. Goldberg was recalled on July 19, and pitched a total of 12 innings for the team during his rookie campaign. On October 4, Goldberg was removed from the 40-man roster and sent outright to Triple-A Charlotte.

Goldberg began the 2018 season pitching for Double-A Birmingham. He had a 2.82 ERA with 32 strikeouts in 22 1/3 innings of relief, before he was traded.

=== Arizona Diamondbacks ===
On June 3, 2018, Goldberg was traded to the Arizona Diamondbacks in exchange for cash considerations. In 2018 for the Jackson Generals of the Southern League, he was 2–1 with 4 saves and an 0.64 ERA, and had 24 strikeouts in 14 innings while giving up only 4 hits. Goldberg was released from the organization on March 14, 2019.

== International career ==
Goldberg pitched for Israel at the 2017 World Baseball Classic qualifier. He picked up saves in Team Israel's first two games. During the first game Goldberg threw 21 pitches while recording all 3 outs in the ninth inning, giving up a hit and a walk, while recording two strikeouts. The next day Goldberg faced the minimum number of batters on 11 pitches with a strikeout, for his second save.

Goldberg left spring training with the Chicago White Sox to join and pitch for Team Israel in the second round of the 2017 World Baseball Classic in Japan, in March 2017. He pitched in two games, pitching 2 scoreless innings.

== Coaching career ==
In October 2019, Goldberg returned to the Ohio State Buckeyes, team as their Director of Pitching Development.

Goldberg was named pitching coach of the Akron RubberDucks, the Double-A affiliate of the Cleveland Guardians, for the 2023 season.

The Guardians named Goldberg their bullpen coach for the 2024 season. He was promoted to the role of assistant pitching coach on December 13, 2024.

== See also ==
- List of Jewish Major League Baseball players
