= Zach Borenstein =

American baseball player (born 1990)

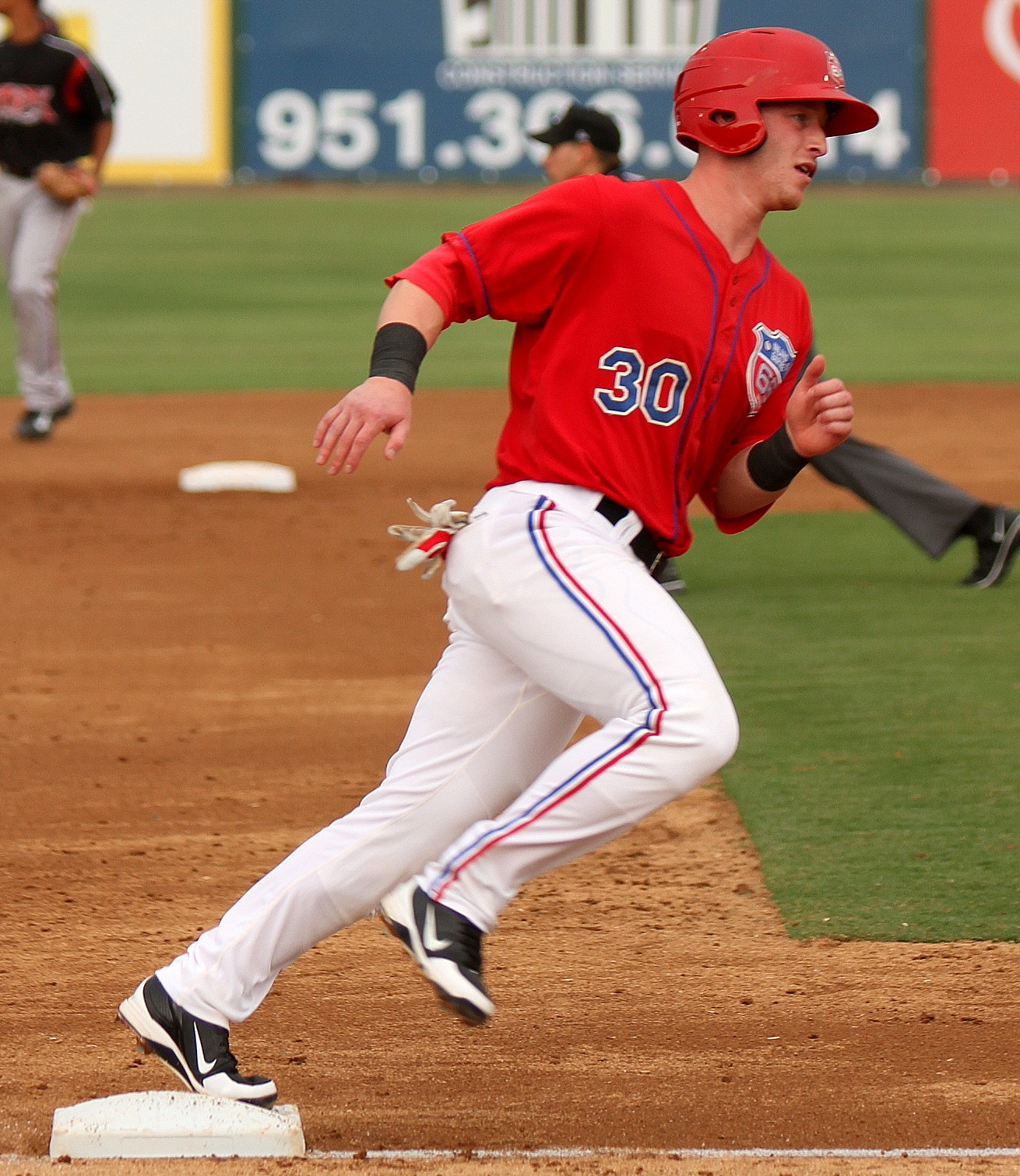
- Borenstein with the Inland Empire 66ers in 2013
- Outfielder
- Born: July 23, 1990 (age 35); Buffalo Grove, Illinois, U.S.
- Bats: Left Throws: Right
- Stats at Baseball Reference

Zachary Borenstein (born July 23, 1990) is an American former professional baseball outfielder.

Borenstein attended Buffalo Grove High School in Illinois, where he was a Chicago Tribune and Chicago Sun-Times All-State honoree. He then attended Eastern Illinois University, where as a freshman in 2009 he had a .503 on base percentage, the best in the Ohio Valley Conference (OVC), and in 2011 he was an OVC First Team Selection. Borenstein was drafted by the Los Angeles Angels of Anaheim in the 23rd round of the 2011 Major League Baseball draft.

== Early life ==
He was born in Arlington Heights, Illinois, the son of David and Nancy Borenstein. His grandparents are June and Joseph Borenstein, and William and Ruth Rosenberg. He is Jewish, and attended Hebrew school and had a bar mitzvah at Congregation Beth-Am in Buffalo Grove, Illinois.

Borenstein's younger sister, Katie, died at age 20 from a blood clot in her pulmonary artery on January 25, 2014. Borenstein has a tattoo on his arm of a song lyric about her.

Borenstein attended Buffalo Grove High School in Illinois, where he played shortstop and set new career school records with a .498 batting average and .970 slugging percentage, and ranked in the top three in school history in home runs, doubles, hits, runs, RBIs and stolen bases. His .524 batting average as a senior was the best in the Mid-Suburban League. He was a Chicago Tribune and Chicago Sun-Times All-State honoree as a senior. He was also a two-time all-area and all-conference player of the year.

== College career ==
For college, Borenstein attended Eastern Illinois University, where he majored in Kinesiology and Sports Studies. As a freshman playing for the Eastern Illinois Panthers in 2009 he had a .503 on base percentage, the best in the Ohio Valley Conference (OVC) and the 20th-best OBP in the nation, while batting .394. He was a 2009 OVC All-Freshman Team Selection and a 2009 Louisville Slugger Freshman All-American. In 2010 as a sophomore he batted .353, playing third base primarily. In 2011, he was an OVC First Team Selection after batting .349, playing in the outfield primarily. His career .450 OBP was 5th-best in school history, and his .362 batting average was 6th-best.

== Minor leagues ==
=== Los Angeles Angels ===
Borenstein was drafted by the Los Angeles Angels of Anaheim in the 23rd round of the 2011 Major League Baseball draft out of Eastern Illinois University after his junior year. He made his professional debut at the age of 20 with the AZL Angels of the Rookie Arizona League, hitting .274/.397/.451 with two home runs in 113 at bats over 31 games, with 12 steals in 13 attempts. In 2012, he played for the Cedar Rapids Kernels of the Class A Midwest League. He hit .266/.339/.485 with 11 home runs in 293 at bats in 79 games.

In 2013, he played for the Inland Empire 66ers of the Class A+ California League, hitting .337/.403/.631 with 28 home runs and 95 RBIs over 407 at bats in 112 games. Borenstein led the league in batting average (5th among all minor leaguers), home runs, and slugging percentage (2nd among all minor leaguers), was 2nd among all minor leaguers in OPS (1.034), and was second in the league in runs batted in. He was named the California League MVP. He was also named the Angels' 2013 Minor League Player of the Year, was a CAL mid-season All Star, was a post-season All Star, was a Topps Class A All Star, was an MILB.com Angels Organization All Star, was Topps Cal Player of the Year, and was CAL Player of the Week on July 29, 2013.

In 2014, Borenstein was invited to spring training by the Angels.

=== Arizona Diamondbacks ===
On July 5, 2014, Borenstein was traded with fellow prospect Joey Krehbiel to the Arizona Diamondbacks in exchange for Joe Thatcher and Tony Campana. For the season, he played for the Arkansas Travelers of the Double–A Texas League, the Mobile BayBears of the Double–A Southern League, and the Salt Lake City Bees and Reno Aces of the Triple–A Pacific Coast League. He batted a combined .258/.320/.432 in 461 at bats.

He played most of 2015 for the Mobile BayBears of the AA Southern League, batting .314/.394/.511 with 10 home runs and 57 RBIs in 280 at bats. Borenstein was MILB.com Southern League Player of the Month in July 2015, and was a Southern League mid-season All Star, and was an MILB.com Southern League Player of the Month for July 2015. He also played 18 games for the Reno Aces of the AAA Pacific Coast League, batting .154 in 52 at bats.

In 2016, Borenstein batted .272/.337/.440 in 357 at bats for Reno of the Triple–A Pacific Coast League, with 15 steals in 16 attempts.

Playing again for the Reno Aces in 2017, he was named the PCL Player of the Week for August 7–13. For the season, Borenstein batted .279/.351/.573 (8th in the PCL) with 27 doubles, 7 triples, 24 home runs, and 91 RBIs (5th in the league) in 384 at bats, and was an MILB.com Arizona Diamondbacks Organization All Star. He elected free agency on November 6.

=== New York Mets ===
On November 22, 2017, Borenstein signed a minor league contract with an invitation to spring training with the New York Mets. He played the 2018 season for the Mets' Triple–A Las Vegas 51s, batting .248/.357/.477. He led the Pacific Coast League with 82 walks, while scoring 92 runs (2nd in the league), and hitting 25 home runs (tied for 3rd), 32 doubles (tied for 5th), and 90 RBI (7th). Borenstein was the only member of the 51s to be named to the Triple-A All-Star Game. He led all Mets minor leaguers in runs, walks, and doubles. Both MiLB.com and MLB Pipeline named him a Mets Organizational All Star. He was the only position player on the 51s to be with the team from the beginning of the season, and not be either called up or placed on the disabled list. Borenstein elected free agency following the season on November 2, 2018.

=== Chicago Cubs ===
On January 10, 2019, Borenstein signed a minor league contract with the Chicago Cubs. He played for the Triple-A Iowa Cubs of the Pacific Coast League, batting .244/.279/.317 with one home run and six RBI, in 41 at-bats. Borenstein was released by the Cubs organization on April 24.

=== Sugar Land Skeeters ===
On May 19, 2019, Borenstein signed with the Sugar Land Skeeters of the independent Atlantic League of Professional Baseball. In 2019 for the team in 356 at bats he batted .270/.349/.452 with 16 home runs and 67 RBIs. He became a free agent following the season.

=== Colorado Rockies ===
On January 3, 2020, Borenstein signed a minor league contract with the Colorado Rockies. Borenstein was released by the Rockies organization prior to the start of the season on April 7.

=== Sugar Land Skeeters (second stint) ===
In July 2020, Borenstein signed on to play for the Sugar Land Skeeters of the Constellation Energy League (a makeshift 4-team independent league created as a result of the COVID-19 pandemic) for the 2020 season.

Borenstein then played for the Lightening Sloths, and batted .353/.522/.353.

== Team Israel; World Baseball Classic ==
Borenstein played for Israel at the 2017 World Baseball Classic qualifier. During the opening game of the qualifier, he played right field and led off for Israel, going 2-for-5 while scoring a run and picking up an RBI. During the second game of the qualifier Borenstein was hitless in 4 at bats, and struck out twice. During the third and final game, Borenstein went 2-for-4 including a triple, with 1 walk, while scoring 2 runs and picking up a RBI, in addition to committing Israel's only error of the qualifier.

He was the starting right fielder for Team Israel at the 2017 World Baseball Classic main tournament, in March 2017. Borenstein went 5-for-25, with 3 doubles and 2 RBIs in six games, as Israel went 4-2.

== See also ==
- List of select Jewish baseball players
