= Justine Siegal =

American baseball coach and sports educator

- Born: 1975 (age 50–51); New York City, New York, U.S.
- Education: St. Olaf College (B.A.); Kent State University (M.A. in Sport Studies); Springfield College (MA) (Ph.D. in Sport and Exercise Psychology)
- Occupations: Sports Educator, Director, Consultant, Baseball developer
- Employer: Baseball For All
- Known for: first female coach of a professional men's baseball team
- Title: Founder/Executive Director
- Spouse: Jon Freeman
- Website: https://www.justinesiegal.com/

Justine Siegal (born 1975) is an American baseball coach, sports educator and the founder of Baseball For All. In 2009, she became the first female coach of a professional men's baseball team, when she worked for the Brockton Rox, in the independent Canadian American Association of Professional Baseball. In 2011, she became the first woman to throw batting practice to an MLB team, the Cleveland Indians during spring training. In 2015, hired by the Oakland Athletics for a two-week coaching stint in their instructional league in Arizona, she became the first female coach employed by an MLB team. She has also thrown batting practice to the Tampa Bay Rays, St. Louis Cardinals, Houston Astros, and New York Mets.

Siegal is particularly interested and involved in sports gender equity, and noted for her success in coaching baseball in contexts that were previously male-only.

Siegal coached Israel National Baseball Team at the 2016 qualifier for the 2017 World Baseball classic.

Siegal currently coaches in Baseball United for the Arabia Wolves, on the staff of manager John McLaren.

== Early life ==
Siegal was born in Cleveland, Ohio, and is Jewish. Her grandfather and grandmother endowed the Cleveland College of Judaic Studies, now affiliated with Case Western Reserve University called the Laura and Alvin Siegal Lifelong Learning Program. Her grandfather also led the fundraising for Israel Bonds in Cleveland for a number of years.

Siegal grew up in Cleveland Heights, a suburb of Cleveland. She was introduced to baseball at a very young age, as her grandfather frequently took her to Cleveland Indians baseball games. Her father, Michael, always signed her up for baseball, rather than for softball. At 13, her baseball coach told her she didn't belong in baseball because she was a girl and baseball was a boy's sport. She continued playing baseball despite people who discouraged her. At age 16 she made it her goal to coach baseball at a collegiate level. She attended the Brewster Academy (where she played baseball for two years) and Hawken School (her freshman and senior years). In high school, she played third base and pitched.

== Education ==
Siegal attended Beloit College and holds a B.A. from St. Olaf College with a concentration in "Leadership: Religion, Military, and Baseball", an M.A. in Sport Studies from Kent State University, and a Ph.D. in Sport and Exercise Psychology from Springfield College (MA). Her academic focus is in performance enhancement, leadership, sport management, coaching, gender equity, and youth sports.

== Career ==
In 2002, Siegal formed the Sparks, the first all-girl team to compete in a national "boys" baseball tournament. A documentary film, "Girls of Summer" (not to be confused with the 1988 film of the same title), was made about the team.

Along with coaching youth baseball, Siegal was assistant coach for the Springfield College baseball team, the only woman coach in the collegiate baseball ranks in the years of 2008-10. Siegal has been a Coach and Technical Commissioner for the World Baseball Softball Confederation (formally known as the International Baseball Federation). She has coached for the World Children’s Baseball Fair and has served as Baseball's Athlete Representative at the IOC Athlete Forum (2011)

Siegal was also Chair of the WBSC's Women’s Development Commission.

Siegal was the Associate Director of Sports Partnerships at the Center for the Study of Sport in Society at Northeastern Universityfrom 2011-2015.

Founded WPBL (Women's Professional Baseball League) in 2024 with the expected launch and first games in 2026.

=== Work in men's professional baseball ===
Siegal in 2009 became the first female coach of a professional men's baseball team, when she worked for the Brockton Rox, in the independent Canadian American Association of Professional Baseball, as the first-base coach.

In 2011, at the age of 37, she was the first woman to throw batting practice to an MLB team, the Cleveland Indians during spring training. Catcher Paul Phillips, to whom she pitched, said: "I thought she did great. She would fit right in. Had you not seen her pony tails, you would not have thought anything of it." Siegal said: "This is my biggest day in baseball so far. This is the greatest game on earth." She has also thrown batting practice to the Oakland Athletics, Tampa Bay Rays, St. Louis Cardinals, Houston Astros, and New York Mets.

Siegal was hired by the Oakland Athletics in October 2015 for a two-week coaching stint as a guest instructor in their instructional league in Arizona, becoming the first female coach for a Major League Baseball team. David Frost, the A’s assistant general manager, stated that they were thrilled that "Justine will be joining us for instructional league.... she brings with her a wealth of knowledge and expertise from years of playing, coaching, and teaching the game and all of our young players will benefit greatly from her time in camp."

In September 2016 she was an in-uniform mental skills coach for Israel at the 2017 World Baseball Classic qualifier. In addition, Justine's duties included throwing bp, helping on-field practice, and charting the opposing pitchers.

== Baseball For All ==
Growing up being told that baseball is a sport for boys, while softball is the sport for girls, influenced her to start her own nonprofit organization called Baseball For All when she was 23 years old. Siegal is the founder and executive director of Baseball for All, an organization that works toward gender equity in youth baseball by strongly encouraging and providing opportunities for girls to participate in baseball.

== Recognition and honors ==
- Siegal was one of the first winners of ESPNW's Everyday Heroes.
- Siegal's Cleveland Indians jersey was on display in the National Museum of American Jewish History’s exhibit Chasing Dreams: Baseball & Becoming American.
- Siegal donated her Oakland Athletics jersey to the Baseball Hall of Fame.
- Siegal was nominated for the IOC Woman in Sports Award.
- Named "100 Most Powerful People in MLB" by USA Today
- Siegal was inducted into the Women's Sports Museum with the Trailblazer award.
- Siegal was selected as 2022 SABR Dorothy Seymour Mills Lifetime Achievement Award winner.
- First woman to coach in the Mexican Baseball League (2023).
- First women to coach Japanese Professional Baseball (2019).
- First women to coach Professional Baseball in Mexico (2019).
- Inducted into the Western Massachusetts Baseball Hall of Fame (2019).
- Siegal donated all of her Mexico coaching Jerseys to the Mexican Baseball Hall of Fame in Monterey Mexico (2023).
