= Scott Burcham =

American baseball player (born 1993)

- Shortstop
- Born: June 17, 1993 (age 33); Phoenix, Arizona, U.S.
- Bats: Right Throws: Right
- Stats at Baseball Reference

Scott Hunter Burcham OLY (born June 17, 1993) is an American-Israeli former professional baseball shortstop. He also plays for Team Israel.

In high school, Burcham was named the top defensive shortstop in the Greater Los Angeles Area by the Los Angeles Times. In college at Sacramento State, he was voted to the 2015 Preseason All-Western Athletic Conference Team. He was drafted by the Colorado Rockies in the 25th round of the 2015 Major League Baseball draft.

Burcham started at shortstop for Israel at the 2017 World Baseball Classic qualifier. He played for Team Israel at the 2017 World Baseball Classic. In November 2019, he obtained Israeli citizenship so that he could play for Team Israel at the 2020 Summer Olympics. He played shortstop for Team Israel at the 2020 Summer Olympics in Tokyo in the summer of 2021.

== Early life ==
Burcham was born in Phoenix, Arizona, but has lived in La Quinta, California for most of his life. His parents are Tim and Mimi Burcham, and he is Jewish. His father was drafted by the California Angels in 1985 and played 10 years in the minor leagues for the Angels and San Francisco Giants organizations.

== High school ==
Burcham is childhood best friends with catcher Brian Serven. He played baseball as a four-year starter at Palm Desert High School. Burcham was all-California Interscholastic Federation (CIF) as a junior and senior, all-Desert Valley League as a sophomore, junior, and senior, and named the top defensive shortstop in the Southland by the Los Angeles Times before his senior season. He batted .371 in his senior season. He established his high school's career and single-season hits records.

== College ==
Burcham played college baseball for the Sacramento State Hornets, of the Western Athletic Conference (WAC). while majoring in Economics. In his sophomore year in 2013, starting at shortstop he was third in the WAC with 175 assists, and tied for fifth in the WAC with 37 double plays.

In his junior year in 2014, he batted .300/.351/.367 and ranked fourth in the WAC with 71 hits, ninth with 14 doubles, was fifth in the WAC with 154 assists, and was voted to the All-San Luis Obispo NCAA Regional Team. By the end of his junior year he was third in school history with 22 career sacrifice hits. He was voted to the 2015 Preseason All-WAC Team, and in his senior season he batted .329./.382/.465 and had 46 runs (6th in the WAC), 6 triples (leading the conference), 16 stolen bases (4th), and 5 sacrifice flies (leading the conference).

== Professional career ==
=== Colorado Rockies ===
Burcham was drafted by the Colorado Rockies in the 25th round of the 2015 Major League Baseball draft. In 2015, he played for the Boise Hawks of the Class A (Short) Northwest League, posting a .235 batting average with two home runs and 11 RBIs. Burcham played in 2016 for the Asheville Tourists of the Class A (Full) South Atlantic League, batting .271/.338/.382.

In the 2017 season he played for the Lancaster JetHawks of the Class A-Advanced California League. Burcham batted .251/.301/.349 over 235 at bats with three home runs, 26 RBIs, and nine steals.

In the 2018 season Burcham played for the Hartford Yard Goats of the Class AA Eastern League. He batted .263/.328/.349 over 175 at bats with two home runs, 15 RBIs, and six steals. In 2019 with the Yard Goats he batted .200/.287/.295 over 220 at bats with three home runs, 21 RBIs, and five steals.

Burcham did not play in a game in 2020 due to the cancellation of the minor league season because of the COVID-19 pandemic. He began the 2021 season playing for the Triple-A Albuquerque Isotopes, in his AAA debut. Burcham batted .234/.273/.315 over 124 at bats with 1 home run and 9 RBIs in 52 games played. He missed nearly a month of action during the season in order to play for Team Israel at the 2020 Summer Olympics. Burcham elected free agency following the season on November 7, 2021.

=== Southern Maryland Blue Crabs ===
On February 25, 2022, Burcham signed with the Southern Maryland Blue Crabs of the Atlantic League of Professional Baseball. Burcham appeared in two games for the Blue Crabs before he was traded, playing shortstop and going hitless in seven at–bats.

=== Charleston Dirty Birds ===
On April 28, 2022, Burcham was traded to the Charleston Dirty Birds of the Atlantic League in exchange for a player to be named later. In 104 games for Charleston, he batted .246/.301/.335 with six home runs, 39 RBI, and eight stolen bases. Burcham became a free agent following the season.

== Team Israel ==
Burcham played shortstop for Israel at the 2017 World Baseball Classic qualifier. Burcham was the starting shortstop in all three games, while batting eighth. During the opening game of the qualifier Burcham went 1-for-4 with a run scored. Burcham went 1-for-3 during the second game; however, he was thrown out on a caught stealing. In the final game, Burcham went 3-for-4, with a strikeout and two runs scored, finishing the series batting .455.

He was the starting shortstop for Team Israel at the 2017 World Baseball Classic in the main tournament, in March 2017. In the tournament's opener, Burcham singled in the game-winning run in the 10th inning in a 2-1 win over South Korea. In the WBC, he batted .261 with two RBIs and a 1.000 fielding percentage.

In November 2019, he obtained Israeli citizenship so that he could play for Team Israel at the 2020 Summer Olympics in Tokyo.

He played shortstop for Team Israel at the 2020 Summer Olympics in Tokyo in the summer of 2021.
