= Jared Lakind =

American baseball player (born 1992)

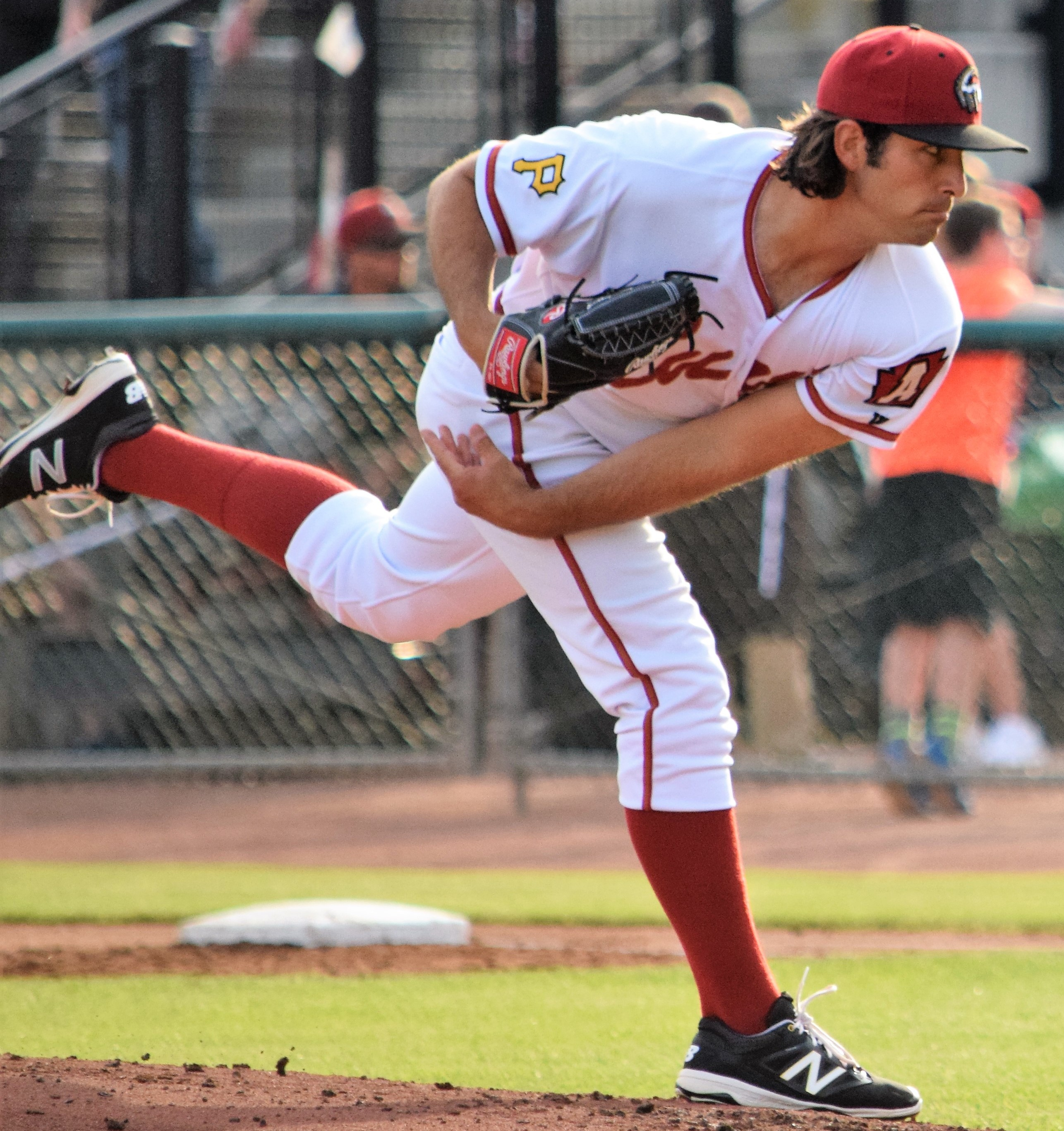
- Lakind with the Altoona Curve in 2017

Free agent
- Pitcher
- Born: March 9, 1992 (age 34); Cypress, Texas, U.S.
- Bats: Left Throws: Left
- Stats at Baseball Reference

Jared Talor Lakind (Hebrew: ג'ארד לקינד; born March 9, 1992) is an American-Israeli professional baseball pitcher who is a free agent. He also plays for Team Israel.

In high school, Lakind played first base, outfield, and pitcher, and in his senior year in 2010 was named the Texas District 15-5A Most Valuable Player, Sun Player of the Year, and a Rawlings-Perfect Game 1st Team All-American. Drafted by the Pittsburgh Pirates in the 23rd round of the 2010 Major League Baseball draft, he signed for $400,000—far above the maximum of $150,000 that Major League Baseball recommended for all players drafted after the 5th round.

In 2013 Lakind was converted to a relief pitcher, and in 2015 he pitched for both the GCL Pirates and the West Virginia Power, and was a combined 3–1 with a 1.69 ERA in 20 games. In 2016, he pitched for the Altoona Curve of the Class AA Eastern League, set a team record for consecutive scoreless innings pitched in a single season at 25.1, and was named to the Eastern League All Star Team. For the season, he was 5–1 with 7 saves, and had a 2.59 ERA in 47 games. Lakind pitched for Team Israel at the 2017 World Baseball Classic qualifier in September 2016, and joined and pitched for the team in the second round of the WBC in Japan in March 2017.

== Early life ==
Lakind was born in Cypress, Texas, and is Jewish. His father, grandfather, and uncle are Israeli citizens. His father, Larry Lakind, played baseball and football at Montclair State in New Jersey, and his grandfather, Alvin Lakind, played professional baseball in 1953 for the Amarillo Gold Sox in the West Texas-New Mexico League. His older sister, Harriet, played high school and college basketball. He began playing t-ball at 4 years of age.

== High school ==
Lakind played first base, outfield, and pitcher while at Cypress Woods High School. In 2009, as a junior he was named a Perfect Game Underclass 1st Team All American, was a member of the 2009 Texas Rangers Area Code Team, and was a member of the 2009 Aflac All American Team. Lakind pitched in the Aflac All-American High School Baseball Classic.

In 2010, as a senior he hit .404/.523/.764, with 5 home runs and 23 RBIs. On the mound he had an 8–0 record, a 1.88 ERA, and 91 strikeouts in 63.1 innings pitched, and pitched the first no-hitter in school history. At the time he threw both a 4-seam and 2-seam fastball that touched 90–91 mph, a curveball with a late break (77–79 mph), and a change-up (81–83 mph).

He was named the District 15-5A Most Valuable Player, and Sun Player of the Year. He was also named a 2010 Rawlings-Perfect Game 1st Team All-American, Texas – All-Region 1st Team, and Rivals.com named him the # 60 high school baseball prospect in the nation (writing "With ability to either stay at first base or develop into a pitcher, Lakind has drawn comparisons all over the map. Most frequently he has been discussed as a 20-home run-type first baseman.").

== Career ==
=== Pittsburgh Pirates ===
Lakind, who had a letter of intent to play for the University of Arkansas, was drafted by the Pirates as a first baseman in the 23rd round of the 2010 Major League Baseball draft, and signed in August 2010 for a signing bonus of $400,000—far above the maximum of $150,000 that Major League Baseball recommended for all players drafted after the 5th round. He began his professional career in 2010 and 2011 as a first baseman with the GCL Pirates of the Rookie Gulf Coast League. In 2012, he played first base for the State College Spikes of the Low–A New York-Penn League.

In 2013, Lakind was converted into a relief pitcher and pitched in 17 games for the Low–A Jamestown Jammers of the New York-Penn League. In 2014, he pitched for both Jamestown and the West Virginia Power of the Single–A South Atlantic League, and for the two affiliates, he logged a combined 0–1 record, 3.31 ERA, and 33 strikeouts across 25 games.

In 2015, Lakind pitched for both the GCL Pirates and West Virginia, and was a combined 3–1 with a 1.69 ERA and 27 strikeouts over 20 appearances. He missed half of the season due to surgery that removed a cyst from the sciatic nerve in his left leg. That year, his fastball was noted as having good deception, which made it look faster to batters.

In 2016, the Pirates skipped Lakind over High–A Bradenton and assigned him to the Altoona Curve of the Double–A Eastern League. He set a team record for consecutive scoreless frames pitched in a single season at 25 1/3 innings from May 5 – June 23. Lakind was named to the Eastern League All–Star Team as a member of the bullpen. For the season, he was 5–1 with 7 saves, a 2.59 ERA, a career–high 66 innings pitched, and 62 strikeouts across 47 appearances. He threw a fastball that reached 94 mph, and possessed a good breaking ball.

On October 13, 2016 the Pirates re–signed Lakind to a minor league contract, which prevented him from becoming a minor league free agent. He started the 2017 season pitching for Altoona, for whom he was 1–1 with 2 saves, a 6.81 ERA, and 38 strikeouts in 35 2/3 innings of work. On July 7, 2017, Lakind was released by the Pirates organization.

=== Miami Marlins ===
On July 13, 2017, Lakind signed a minor league contract with the Miami Marlins organization. He was assigned to the Greensboro Grasshoppers of the Single–A South Atlantic League, for whom he was 1–1 with a 4.24 ERA, before he was promoted to the Jupiter Hammerheads of the High–A Florida State League, for whom he tossed 1 2/3 scoreless innings. He elected free agency following the season on November 6.

=== Lancaster Barnstormers ===
In 2018, Lakind pitched for the Lancaster Barnstormers of the independent Atlantic League of Professional Baseball. He was 2–3 with a 3.83 ERA, in 42 1/3 innings over 41 games. He became a free agent following the 2018 season. In the 2018–19 winter season, he pitched for Charros de Jalisco of the Mexican Pacific Winter League.

In 2019, Lakind re-signed with the Lancaster Barnstormers. Pitching for the team in 2019 he was 7–9 with a 4.82 ERA, and was 10th in the league with 98 strikeouts in 142 innings. He became a free agent following the season. Lakind re-signed with the Barnstormers on February 22, 2020. However, he did not play with the team in 2020 after the season was canceled as a result of the COVID-19 pandemic.

=== Team Texas ===
In July 2020, Lakind signed on to play for Team Texas of the Constellation Energy League (a makeshift 4-team independent league created as a result of the pandemic) for the 2020 season.

=== Lancaster Barnstormers (second stint) ===
On February 26, 2021, Lakind re-signed with the Lancaster Barnstormers of the Atlantic League of Professional Baseball. He only started one game for Lancaster in 2021, tossing two scoreless innings and striking out 5 while walking 2. He became a free agent following the season.

After not playing in 2022, on April 3, 2023, Lakind re-signed with the Barnstormers for the 2023 season. In 23 games (21 starts), he registered a 9–4 record and 3.54 ERA with 99 strikeouts in 112.0 innings of work. With Lancaster, Lakind won the Atlantic League championship.

=== Diablos Rojos del México ===
On March 23, 2024, Lakind signed with the Diablos Rojos del México of the Mexican League. In 15 relief appearances, he posted a 1–0 record a 5.67 ERA and 19 strikeouts over 27 innings pitched. On July 5, 2024, Lakind was released by the Diablos.

=== Sultanes de Monterrey ===
On July 5, 2024, Lakind signed Sultanes de Monterrey of the Mexican League. He made 3 appearances for Monterrey, recording a 2.53 ERA with 11 strikeouts across 10 2/3 innings pitched.

Lakind made 17 appearances (including two starts) for the Sultanes in 2025, posting a 1–2 record with a 5.47 ERA and 25 strikeouts across 24 2/3 innings pitched. On February 16, 2026, Lakind was released by Monterrey.

== Team Israel ==
Lakind pitched for Team Israel at the 2017 World Baseball Classic qualifier in September 2016. To demonstrate to Team Israel that he was Jewish, Lakind's family sent the team a photo of the tombstone of Lakind's grandmother, with a Star of David carved onto it. Lakind's only appearance in the tournament was during the second game, against Brazil. He threw 31 pitches over 1 inning, walking 2 and striking out 2, and picking up the hold.

Lakind pitched for Team Israel in the second round of the 2017 World Baseball Classic. He pitched in 2 games, pitching 1.2 scoreless innings.

In November 2019, he obtained Israeli citizenship so that he could play for Team Israel in baseball at the 2020 Summer Olympics in Tokyo. Lakind was included on the roster for Team Israel at the 2020 Olympics, but was later replaced after suffering an injury while playing for the Lancaster Barnstormers.
