= Tyler Krieger =

American baseball player (born 1994)

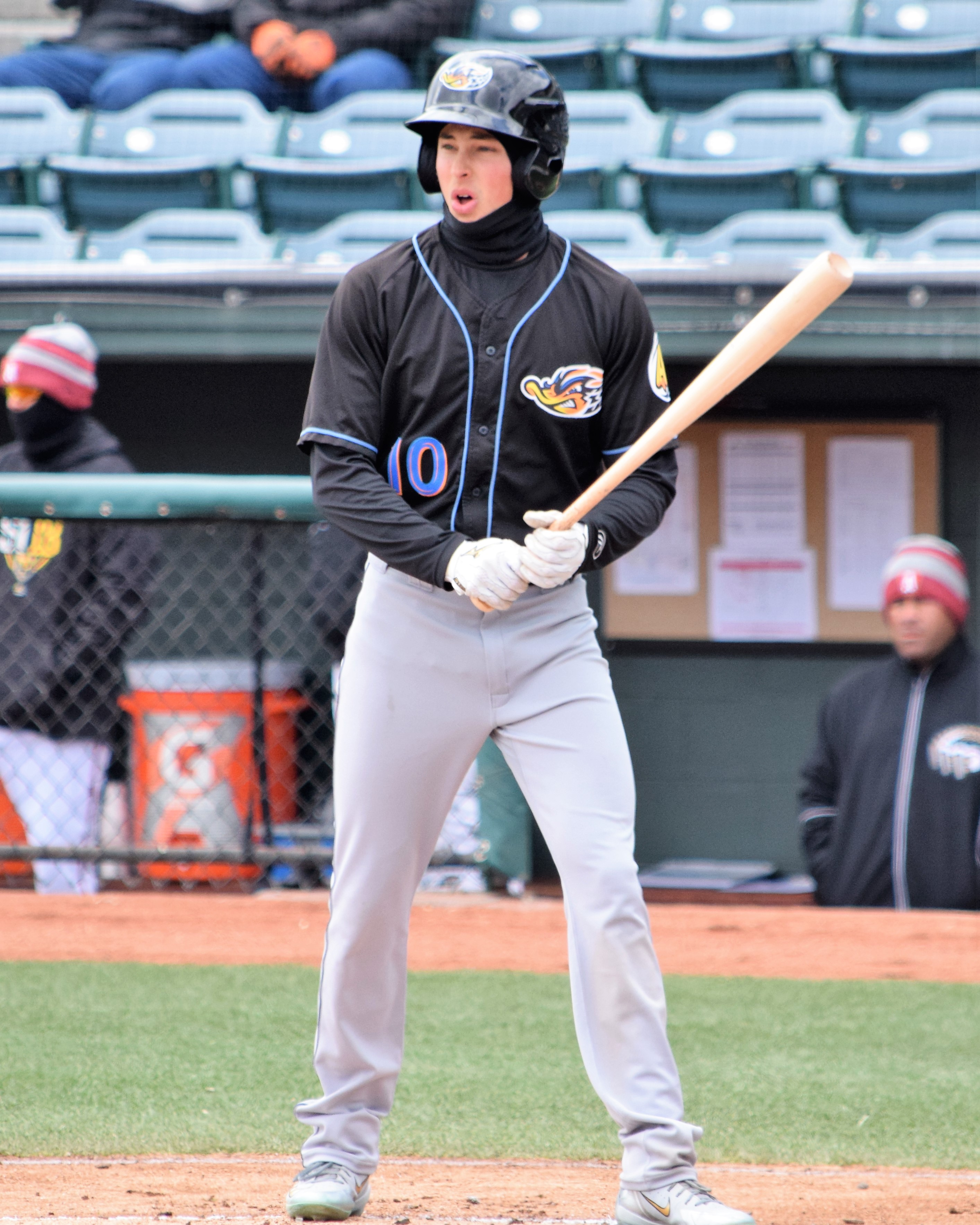
- Krieger with the Akron RubberDucks in 2018
- Second baseman/Outfielder
- Born: January 16, 1994 (age 32); Laguna Hills, California, U.S.
- Bats: Switch Throws: Right
- Stats at Baseball Reference

Tyler Bram Krieger (born January 16, 1994) is an American former professional baseball second baseman and outfielder.

Krieger was an ESPN all-state selection in Georgia in high school. He then attended Clemson University, where he was 5th in the Atlantic Coast Conference in batting as a sophomore. He was drafted by the Cleveland Indians in the 4th round of the 2015 MLB draft. In 2016 with the Single-A Lake County Captains he was a mid-season Midwest League All Star, and that season he was also an MILB.com Cleveland Organization All Star. In January 2017, MLB.com ranked him as the 10th-best minor league second baseman. Krieger was the starting second baseman for Team Israel at the 2017 World Baseball Classic in March 2017.

== Early life ==
Krieger was born in Laguna Hills, California, and is Jewish on his father's side, as his father and his paternal grandparents are Jewish. His father, Bram, played baseball at Ithaca College.

Krieger attended Northview High School in Johns Creek, Georgia, where he was an ESPN all-state selection, and was drafted by the Seattle Mariners in the 35th round of the 2012 Major League Baseball draft. He did not sign with the Mariners, and instead went to college.

== College ==
He attended Clemson University, where he played shortstop for the Clemson Tigers in college baseball. He was ranked the Perfect Game # 23 freshman in the country, and played during the summer for Santa Barbara in the California Collegiate League. As a sophomore, in 57 games he was 5th in the Atlantic Coast Conference (ACC) in batting (.338), runs (49), and doubles (18), and 6th in steals (19), and was a second-team All-ACC selection, an All-ACC Academic selection, and a Brooks Wallace Shortstop-of-the-Year Award Watch List member.

As a junior, he was a pre-season Perfect Game first-team All-ACC. After his junior year, he was named the Perfect Game 11th-best pre-season ACC prospect for the draft, and was drafted by the Cleveland Indians in the fourth round of the 2015 MLB draft, signing for $400,000. He was ranked the Indians' # 20 prospect by Baseball America at the end of 2015.

== Professional career ==
=== Cleveland Indians ===
Krieger made his professional debut in 2016 with the Class A Lake County Captains, for whom he played second base, batted .313 with three home runs and 35 RBIs in 69 games that included a 23-game hitting streak, and was a mid-season Midwest League All Star. He was then promoted to the Class A-Advanced Lynchburg Hillcats during the season, for whom he batted .282 in 59 games with two home runs and 23 RBIs and was Carolina League Player of the Week on August 21. He was an MILB.com Cleveland Organization All Star, and in January 2017 MLB.com ranked him as the 10th-best minor league second baseman. He was ranked as the Indians' # 18 pre-2017 season prospect by MLBPipeline.com.

In 2017 he played for the Akron RubberDucks in the Class AA Eastern League, batting .225/.303/.337 with six home runs, 43 RBIs, 12 stolen bases, and seven sacrifice hits (tied for 3rd in the league) in 119 games. After the season, the Indians assigned him to the Glendale Desert Dogs in the Arizona Fall League.

He returned to the RubberDucks for the 2018 season, batting .276/.332/.372 with five home runs, 55 RBIs, and 19 stolen bases in 123 games, that included a 24-game hitting streak. He played 54 games in left field, 34 games in center field, and 17 games at second base.

In 2019 he split the season between 48 games for the RubberDucks and 13 games for the Columbus Clippers of the Triple-A International League. In a combined 207 at bats he hit .208/.291/.309 with four home runs, 20 RBIs and 10 steals while playing 45 games at third base, 10 games in left field, two games at second base, and four games at DH. Kriegerdid not play in a game in 2020 due to the cancellation of the minor league season because of the COVID-19 pandemic. In 2021, Krieger spent the year with Triple-A Columbus, hitting .169/.223/.238 in 60 games for the team. Krieger elected free agency on November 7, 2021.

=== Chicago White Sox ===
On February 24, 2022, Krieger signed a minor league contract with the Chicago White Sox. Krieger was released by the White Sox organization prior to the season on April 5.

=== Atlanta Braves ===
On April 18, 2022, Krieger signed a minor league contract with the Atlanta Braves. He appeared in 7 games split between the Double-A Mississippi Braves and the rookie-level Florida Complex League Braves, going 4-for-28 with two RBI. On June 27, Krieger retired from professional baseball.

== Team Israel ==
Krieger was the starting second baseman for Team Israel at the 2017 World Baseball Classic in March 2017.

== Personal life ==
Krieger resides in Atlanta with his wife, Ashley ShahAhmadi, a sideline reporter for the Charlotte Hornets whom he married in 2023.
