= Andrew Lorraine =

American baseball player (born 1972)

- Pitcher
- Born: August 11, 1972 (age 54); Los Angeles, California, U.S.
- Batted: Left Threw: Left

MLB debut
- July 17, 1994, for the California Angels

Last MLB appearance
- September 26, 2002, for the Milwaukee Brewers

MLB statistics
- Win–loss record: 6–11
- Earned run average: 6.53
- Strikeouts: 113

CPBL statistics
- Win–loss record: 9–6
- Earned run average: 3.70
- Strikeouts: 56
- Stats at Baseball Reference

Teams
- California Angels (1994); Chicago White Sox (1995); Oakland Athletics (1997); Seattle Mariners (1998); Chicago Cubs (1999–2000); Cleveland Indians (2000); Milwaukee Brewers (2002); La New Bears (2007–2008)
Medals
Men's baseball
Representing United States
World Junior Baseball Championship
| Bronze medal – third place | 1990 Cuba | Team |

Andrew Jason Lorraine (born August 11, 1972) is an American former professional baseball pitcher. He played in Major League Baseball (MLB) from 1994 to 2002 for the California Angels, Chicago White Sox, Oakland Athletics, Seattle Mariners, Chicago Cubs, Cleveland Indians, and Milwaukee Brewers. He was born in Los Angeles, California. He also played for the La New Bears in Taiwan's Chinese Professional Baseball League.

In high school, Lorraine was named the Los Angeles Times High School Pitcher of the Year, and a member of the USA Junior National Team. He was drafted, for a second time, out of Stanford University in the fourth round in 1993 by the California Angels. He pitched for the California Angels, Chicago White Sox, Oakland Athletics, Seattle Mariners, Chicago Cubs, Cleveland Indians, and Milwaukee Brewers.

Lorraine was a pitching coach for the Seattle Mariners organization from 2009–16, and in December 2016 was hired by the Pittsburgh Pirates as a professional scout. Lorraine has been the pitching coach of the Israel national baseball team, and was the pitching coach for Team Israel at the 2017 World Baseball Classic in South Korea and Japan in March 2017. He was also the pitching coach for Team Israel at the 2019 European Baseball Championship, and for the team at the Africa/Europe 2020 Olympic Qualification tournament, in Italy in September 2019, which Israel won.

== Early and personal life ==
Lorraine was born in Los Angeles, grew up in Newhall, Santa Clarita, California, and is Jewish. He is the son of Marlene and Michael (Mike) Lorraine; his mother is from New Jersey and his father emigrated to the United States from Blackpool, England. Lorraine's paternal grandfather, who emigrated from Poland to England, was originally named Levin, but after his grandfather spent time in Alsace-Lorraine in France in World War II with the British army, Andrew Lorraine said: "He liked the name Lorraine, and changed his name...."

He has an older sister, Karen.

== High school ==
Lorraine attended William S. Hart High School in Newhall. While in high school, as a junior he was 9–5 with a 2.18 ERA, and struck out 101 batters in 93 innings. After a senior year in 1990 in which he was 9-0 and 6 saves with a 0.91 ERA while striking out 138 batters and yielding 45 hits in 85 innings he was named the Los Angeles Times High School Pitcher of the Year, and a member of the USA Junior National Team. Lorraine was in the selected out of high school in the 38th round of the 1990 draft by the New York Mets, but chose to continue his education.

== College ==
He attended and played baseball for the Cardinal baseball team at Stanford University on scholarship, obtaining a degree in American Studies. In 1991 and 1992, he played collegiate summer baseball with the Hyannis Mets of the Cape Cod Baseball League. In 1993, Lorraine was Pac-10 All-Conference. He was then drafted in the fourth round in 1993 by the California Angels.

== Professional baseball ==
=== Pitcher ===
In 1993, for the Boise Hawks, Lorraine was 4–1 with a 1.29 ERA. In 1994, he went 12–4 with a 3.42 ERA for the Vancouver Canadians, tied for second in the league in wins and tied for the league lead with four complete games and two shutouts, and was chosen both as a Triple-A All-Star pitcher in the Pacific Coast League (PCL) and as a Triple A All-Star, and Baseball America named him the PCL # 1 Pitching Prospect.

Called up, he made his first appearance with the Angels at the age of 21, pitching in four games. In Lorraine's rookie season he was the losing pitcher for the California Angels in Kenny Rogers' perfect game for the Texas Rangers on July 28, 1994.

In July 1995, Lorraine was traded by the Angels with Bill Simas, John Snyder, and McKay Christensen to the Chicago White Sox for Tim Fortugno and Jim Abbott. Pitching for the Nashville Sounds, he was 4–1.

When Lorraine returned to the majors that year, pitching for the White Sox, he appeared as a reliever in five games, with a 3.38 ERA, giving up 3 hits in 8 innings.

In January 1996, he was traded by the White Sox with Charles Poe to the Oakland Athletics for Danny Tartabull.

He had six starts with the Oakland Athletics in 1997, going 3–1 in 12 games, and was traded to the Seattle Mariners in 1998, where Lorraine had an ERA of 2.45 in four games. Pitching for the Tacoma Rainiers of the AAA Pacific Coast League in 1998, he was 7–4 with two saves and a 4.82 ERA. In 1999, he was 9–8 with a 3.71 ERA in 21 starts and 1 relief appearance for the Iowa Cubs of the AAA Pacific Coast League, and 2–5 with a 5.55 ERA in 11 starts for the Chicago Cubs.

Playing for the Chicago Cubs in 2000, Lorraine had a 1–2 record and was released. He finished the season with the Cleveland Indians, with whom he had an ERA of 3.86 in 10 games, and their Triple-A affiliate the Buffalo Bisons of the International League, where he went 8–3 with a 3.47 ERA.

In 2001, Lorraine pitched 29 games for the Calgary Cannons of the AAA Pacific Coast League, going 9–5 in 25 starts and 5 relief appearances, and joined the Scranton/Wilkes-Barre Red Barons for the playoffs. In 2002 he had five appearances with the Milwaukee Brewers, and returned to the minors in 2003, playing for the Las Vegas 51s and leading their starters with an ERA of 4.15.

Lorraine signed a minor league contract prior to the 2004 season with the Minnesota Twins. In 2005, Lorraine was a member of the Baltimore Orioles organization. In 2006, he pitched for the Long Island Ducks of the independent Atlantic League, going 2–1 with a 3.12 ERA in 9 games, and the Charlotte Knights of the International League, where he had a 1.95 ERA in 27.2 innings.

In 2009, he pitched for the Orange County Flyers of the Golden Baseball League, going 0–1 with a 4.50 ERA in 4 starts.

=== Major league organizations' pitching coach and scout ===
Lorraine was a pitching coach for the Seattle Mariners organization from 2009 to 2016. In December 2016 he was hired by the Pittsburgh Pirates as a professional scout.

== Team Israel coach ==
In September 2012, Lorraine was the pitching coach for the 2013 qualifier for Israel at the World Baseball Classic. In September 2016, Lorraine was the pitching coach for Israel at the 2017 World Baseball Classic qualifier. He returned in the same role, and coached Team Israel at the 2017 World Baseball Classic main tournament in South Korea and Japan.

He was the pitching coach for Team Israel at the 2019 European Baseball Championship, for the team at the Africa/Europe 2020 Olympic Qualification tournament, in Italy in September 2019, which Israel won.

== Honors ==
In 2016 he was inducted into the Southern California Jewish Sports Hall of Fame.

== See also ==
- List of Jewish Major League Baseball players
