= Nick Rickles =

American baseball player (born 1990)

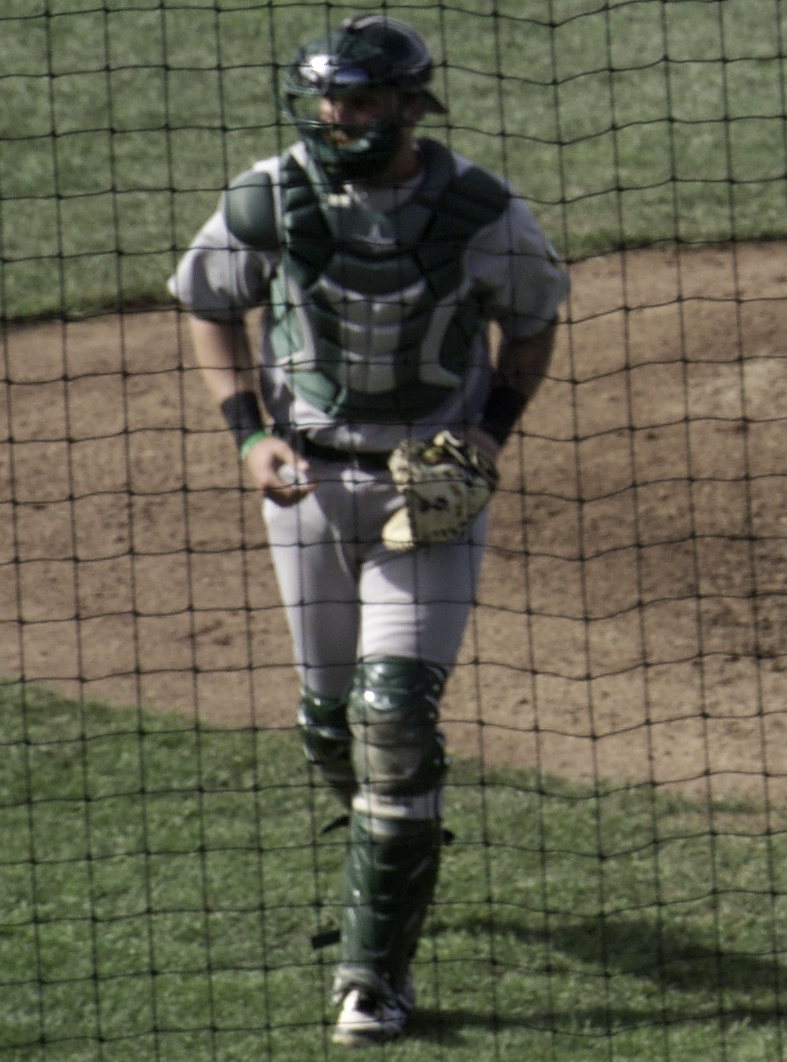
- Rickles with the Beloit Snappers in 2013
- Catcher
- Born: February 2, 1990 (age 36); Fort Lauderdale, Florida, U.S.
- Bats: Right Throws: Right
- Stats at Baseball Reference

Nicholas Jay Rickles (Hebrew: ניק ריקלס; born February 2, 1990) is an American-Israeli coach for the Milwaukee Brewers organization, and a former professional baseball and current Team Israel catcher.

As a high school senior, Rickles was voted Florida All-State. At Stetson University, he was named a TPX Louisville Slugger Freshman All-American by Collegiate Baseball, and in his junior year in 2011 was named First Team All-Atlantic Sun Conference and a College Baseball All America Honorable Mention. Rickles was drafted by the Oakland Athletics in the 14th round of the 2011 Major League Baseball draft.

In 2011, he was voted a New York-Pennsylvania League mid-season All Star while playing for the Vermont Lake Monsters. Rickles was voted Midwest League Player of the Week on July 29, 2013, while playing for the Beloit Snappers. He missed the entire 2014 season after suffering a torn labrum in his throwing shoulder. In February 2016, Rickles signed a minor league contract with the Washington Nationals. He played that season for the Double–A Eastern League Harrisburg Senators, and the Triple–A International League Syracuse Chiefs.

Rickles played on Team Israel during the qualifying round of the 2013 World Baseball Classic, the qualifying round for the 2017 World Baseball Classic in September 2016, and for Team Israel at the 2017 World Baseball Classic main tournament. In 2019, Rickles became a coach for the Milwaukee Brewers organization. He played for Team Israel at the 2019 European Baseball Championship. He also played for the team at the Africa/Europe 2020 Olympic Qualification tournament in Italy in September 2019, which Israel won to qualify to play baseball at the 2020 Summer Olympics. He was the designated hitter for Team Israel at the 2020 Summer Olympics in Tokyo in the summer of 2021.

== Early and personal life ==
Rickles was born in Fort Lauderdale, Florida, grew up in Loxahatchee, Florida, and is Jewish. His parents are Linda and Ken Rickles. Nick Rickles is not married. In January 2018, he launched a blog, My Life & Baseball.

== High school ==
He attended Palm Beach Gardens Community High School in Palm Beach Gardens, Florida. As a senior, when Rickles became a catcher, he batted .512 (third in Palm Beach County) with an .869 slugging percentage and 5 home runs and 32 RBIs (both second in Palm Beach County), while throwing out 80% of attempted base stealers, and was voted All-State. He was voted First Team All-Conference and All-Area as both a junior and a senior, and named "Player to Watch" by the Palm Beach Post.

== College ==
Rickles played college baseball for Stetson University, where he majored in Sports Management. In 2009 as a freshman, he started all 57 games and was second in the league in runners thrown out stealing with 19. He was named a TPX Louisville Slugger Freshman All-American by Collegiate Baseball, and voted to the Atlantic Sun Conference All-Freshman Team. In 2010 as a sophomore he played in all 58 games, had a .997 fielding percentage at catcher, threw out 19 runners attempting to steal and also picked off 7 runners, and was on the Johnny Bench Award Watch List.

In his junior year in 2011, his last season in college, Rickles hit .353, with 20 doubles (3rd in the Atlantic Sun Conference), 3 triples (8th), 12 home runs, and 62 RBIs (5th), and had an OPS of 1.008. That season he had a streak of 178 at bats without striking out, led the Stetson Hatters into the NCAA Regionals, and was named First Team All-Atlantic Sun and a College Baseball All America Honorable Mention.

== Professional career ==
=== Oakland Athletics ===
Rickles was drafted by the Oakland Athletics in the 14th round of the 2011 Major League Baseball draft. He used his $60,000 signing bonus to buy himself a Chevy Avalanche pickup truck, and also received payment for his final year of college if he chooses to finish his degree.

He made his professional debut in 2011 playing for the Rookie Arizona League Athletics and the Low-A New York-Penn League Vermont Lake Monsters, for whom in 47 aggregate games Rickles batted .310/.370/.458 with 2 home runs and 35 RBIs, and 6 stolen bases himself in 7 attempts, while throwing out 42% of stolen base attempts. He was voted a 2011 New York-Pennsylvania League mid-season All Star while playing for Vermont, and co-winner of the 2011 Tom Racine Award (the fans' choice for the most valuable player of the Monsters).

Rickles spent the 2012 season with the Single-A Midwest League Burlington Bees, for whom he threw out 43% of attempted base stealers. In 2013, he played for the Class A Midwest League Beloit Snappers (for whom the threw out 42% of attempted base stealers) and the Double-A Texas League Midland RockHounds. He was voted Midwest League Player of the Week on July 29, 2013.

He missed the entire 2014 season after suffering a torn labrum in his throwing shoulder during spring training in February 2014, that necessitated surgery on May 5, 2014. Rickles returned in 2015 with the Class A-Advanced California League Stockton Ports, Midland (throwing out 46% of attempted base stealers), and the Triple-A Pacific Coast League Nashville Sounds. Midland RockHounds manager Ryan Christenson said:

"Any time you have a catcher that can control the running game, it’s real important. He does more than just throw out base runners though. He’s very adept at throwing behind runners trying to pick guys off and keep them honest. He handles the pitching staff well."

He was released by the Athletics after the season, in October 2015.

=== Washington Nationals ===
On February 1, 2016, Rickles signed a minor league contract with the Washington Nationals. He played in 2016 for the Double-A Eastern League Harrisburg Senators (catching 30% of attempted base stealers), and the Triple-A International League Syracuse Chiefs.

=== Philadelphia Phillies ===
On May 25, 2017, the Nationals traded Rickles to the Philadelphia Phillies. He hit .274/.310/.484 in 95 at bats and caught 44% of attempted basestealers for the Reading Fightin Phils of the Double–A Eastern League, and then played 9 games for the Lehigh Valley IronPigs of the Triple-A International League. He elected free agency following the season on November 6.

On December 23, 2017, Rickles re-signed a minor league deal with the Philadelphia Phillies. Rickles played the entire 2018 season for the IronPigs in Triple-A. Rickles batted .245/.271/.394 in 188 at bats, with 7 home runs and 26 RBI. On November 2, 2018, he elected free agency.

Through 2018, in seven minor league seasons Rickles batted .246/.279/.377 with 34 home runs and 186 RBI in 1,420 at bats, playing 355 games at catcher and 12 games at first base. On defense, he caught 42% of attempted base stealers.

== Team Israel ==
Rickles, who is Jewish, played on the Israeli national baseball team during the qualifying round of the 2013 World Baseball Classic. Rickles only appearance in the tournament was as a late-inning defensive replacement, and he did not record any at bats.

Rickles again played for Israel at the 2017 World Baseball Classic qualifier in September 2016. During the opening game he went 1 for 3 with a strikeout, as the DH, before being pinch hit for by Ike Davis, and Rickles did not play in the final two games.

Rickles played for Team Israel at the 2017 World Baseball Classic.

He played for Team Israel at the 2019 European Baseball Championship. Rickles also played for the team at the Africa/Europe 2020 Olympic Qualification tournament in Italy in September 2019, which Israel won to qualify to play baseball at the 2020 Summer Olympics in Tokyo. In the tournament he caught every game, batted .316/.409/.632, and was tied for second in home runs (2) and tied for third in runs (5).

He was the designated hitter for Team Israel at the 2020 Summer Olympics in Tokyo in the summer of 2021.

== Coaching career ==
In January 2019, Rickles retired as a player and became a coach for the rookie-level Rocky Mountain Vibes in the Milwaukee Brewers organization.
