= Jerry Weinstein =

American professional baseball manager (born 1943)

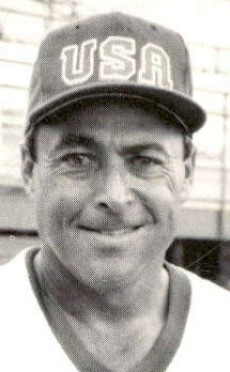
- Manager
- Born: November 9, 1943 (age 82); Los Angeles, California, U.S.
- Bats: Right Throws: Right
- Stats at Baseball Reference

Jerry Weinstein (born November 9, 1943) is an American professional baseball manager. He most recently managed the 2017 Hartford Yard Goats, a Minor League Baseball (MiLB) Double-A team in the Eastern League, an affiliate of the Colorado Rockies.

Weinstein managed Team Israel at the 2017 World Baseball Classic qualifiers, in September 2016, and during the main tournament the following March (2017), in South Korea and Japan. In 2018, he received Baseball America's Tony Gwynn Lifetime Achievement Award. In 2020 he was named recipient of the American Baseball Coaches Association/Wilson Lefty Gomez Award.

== Early life ==
Weinstein was born in Los Angeles, and is Jewish. He earned his bachelor's degree in health and physical education at the University of California, Los Angeles (UCLA) in 1965, and his master's degree in physical education at UCLA in 1969.

== Baseball coaching and managing career ==
Weinstein began his coaching career in 1966 as a UCLA freshman coach. He was an assistant under Ron Fraser on the 1984 University of Miami baseball team, which came in fourth at the College World Series.

Weinstein then coached at Sacramento City College. He led the school to 831 wins across 23 seasons, and led the team to 16 league titles, the California Community College Athletic Association state title in 1988 and 1998, and one national title. A total of 213 of his players were drafted, including 28 who reached the major leagues.

Weinstein managed the rookie-level Gulf Coast Expos of the Gulf Coast League in 1989. He managed the Class A Short Season Geneva Cubs of the New York–Penn League in 1993, and the Class A-Short Season Williamsport Cubs of the New York–Penn League in 1994.

After returning to Sacramento City College, Weinstein served as director of player development for the Los Angeles Dodgers in 2000 and 2001, and then coached for California State Polytechnic University, San Luis Obispo (Cal Poly) from 2001 through 2005. He coached Team USA to a gold medal at the 2005 Maccabiah Games.

Weinstein left Cal Poly to become the manager of the Class A–Advanced Modesto Nuts in the California League in 2007, and managed them through 2011.

The Colorado Rockies added Weinstein to their major league staff before the 2012 season. After the 2013 season, the Rockies reassigned Weinstein, putting him in charge of player development in the minor leagues.

In the summer of 2016, Weinstein was the Wareham Gatemen Head Coach in the Cape Cod Baseball League. In 2019, Weinstein returned to manage Wareham again after a two-year hiatus.

In 2017, Weinstein was the manager of the Hartford Yard Goats, in the Double-A Eastern League, in the Colorado Rockies organization. The 73-year-old observed: "They hired an old goat to manage the Yard Goats,". In 2018, he stepped down as manager but remained in the organization as Rockies player development and scouting special assistant, performing scouting and player development tasks at the discretion of Zach Wilson, the Rockies player development director, and the Rockies' organization.

In 2019, Weinstein again managed the Wareham Gatemen in the Cape Cod Baseball League. He was scheduled to managed the team again in 2020, before the season was canceled due to the COVID-19 pandemic.

=== International competitions ===
Weinstein served as the assistant coach for the United States national baseball team in the 1992 Summer Olympics; the team did not medal. He again coached for the national team in the 1996 Summer Olympics, along with Skip Bertman; the team won a bronze medal.

Weinstein managed Team Israel at the 2017 World Baseball Classic qualifier, leading them to a 3–0 record, qualifying Israel for their first World Baseball Classic appearance. He returned as the manager in the main tournament, managing Team Israel at the 2017 World Baseball Classic main tournament in South Korea and Japan in March 2017, where the team was 4–2 overall in the tournament.

In April 2021, Weinstein was named as bench coach for the U.S. national team, for the team's final efforts to qualify for baseball at the 2020 Summer Olympics in Tokyo in 2021. The team qualified, with Weinstein serving as bench coach for the Olympics. The team went on to win silver, falling to Japan in the gold-medal game.

== Accolades ==
Weinstein is a member of the Sacramento City College Athletic Hall of Fame, the California Community College Hall of Fame, and the American Baseball Coaches Association Hall of Fame. He was also inducted into the Sacramento Baseball Hall of Fame in 2017. In 2018, he received Baseball America's Tony Gwynn Lifetime Achievement Award. In 2020 he was named recipient of the American Baseball Coaches Association/Wilson Lefty Gomez Award for contributions to the game locally, nationally, and internationally.

== Writing ==
Weinstein co-authored Baseball Coach's Survival Guide: Practical Techniques and Materials for Building an Effective Program and a Winning Team (Wiley; 1998), with Tom Alston.

Weinstein’s Twitter page, on which he writes professional analysis of major league plays, has over 99,000 followers.

Preceded by None	Colorado Rockies catching coach 2013	Succeeded by Rene Lachemann
