= Israel at the 2020 Summer Olympics =

- IOC code: ISR
- NOC: Olympic Committee of Israel
- Website: www.olympicsil.co.il (in Hebrew and English)

in Tokyo, Japan 23 July 2021 – 8 August 2021
- Competitors: 90 (55 men and 35 women) in 15 sports and 66 events
- Flag bearers (opening): Yakov Toumarkin; Hanna Knyazyeva-Minenko
- Flag bearer (closing): Linoy Ashram
- Medals Ranked 39th: Gold 2 Silver 0 Bronze 2 Total 4

Summer Olympics appearances (overview)
- 1952; 1956; 1960; 1964; 1968; 1972; 1976; 1980; 1984; 1988; 1992; 1996; 2000; 2004; 2008; 2012; 2016; 2020; 2024; 2028

Israel competed at the 2020 Summer Olympics in Tokyo with its largest contingent to date − a delegation of 90 athletes, 55 men and 35 women, who competed in 15 different sports. This was almost double the previous number of 47 athletes who represented Israel at the 2016 Rio de Janeiro Olympics. The Games were also Israel's most successful to date, winning four medals, including two gold. At Tokyo, Israel marked its Olympic debuts in surfing (new to the 2020 Games), baseball (returning to the Games), archery, equestrian and marathon swimming.

Israel returned home from Tokyo with two gold and two bronze medals, a record number of medals won by Israel in one Olympics. Artistic gymnast Artem Dolgopyat won the gold medal in the men's floor exercise and rhythmic gymnast Linoy Ashram won the gold medal at the women's rhythmic individual all-around event. Taekwondo practitioner Avishag Semberg won the bronze medal in the Women's 49 kg category and the national judo team won another bronze medal in the mixed team event. Several Israeli athletes advanced to the finals of their respective sporting events, but narrowly missed out on standing on the winner's podium.

Originally scheduled to take place in the summer of 2020, the Games were postponed because of the COVID-19 pandemic until 23 July to 8 August 2021. Since Israel's debut in 1952, Israeli athletes have appeared in every edition of the Summer Olympic Games, other than the 1980 Summer Olympics in Moscow, which it opted not to attend because of the nation's support for the US-led boycott. This was Israel's 17th appearance at the Summer Olympics.

Backstroke swimmer Yakov Toumarkin and triple jumper Hanna Knyazyeva-Minenko were chosen as the nation's flag bearers at the opening ceremony and Linoy Ashram was chosen as the nation's flag bearer at the closing ceremony.

Also, for the first time since 11 Israeli athletes and a West German police officer were murdered during the Munich Olympics in 1972 by the Palestinian terrorist group Black September, a moment of silence was held during the opening ceremony of the Olympic Games.

== Medalists ==
Medal	Name	Sport	Event	Date
Gold	Artem Dolgopyat	Gymnastics	Men's floor	1 August
Gold	Linoy Ashram	Gymnastics	Rhythmic individual all-around	7 August
Bronze	Avishag Semberg	Taekwondo	Women's 49 kg	24 July
Bronze	Israel national judo team: Tohar Butbul; Raz Hershko; Li Kochman; Inbar Lanir; Sagi Muki; Timna Nelson-Levy; Peter Paltchik; Shira Rishony; Or Sasson; Gili Sharir; Baruch Shmailov	Judo	Mixed team	31 July

== Competitors ==
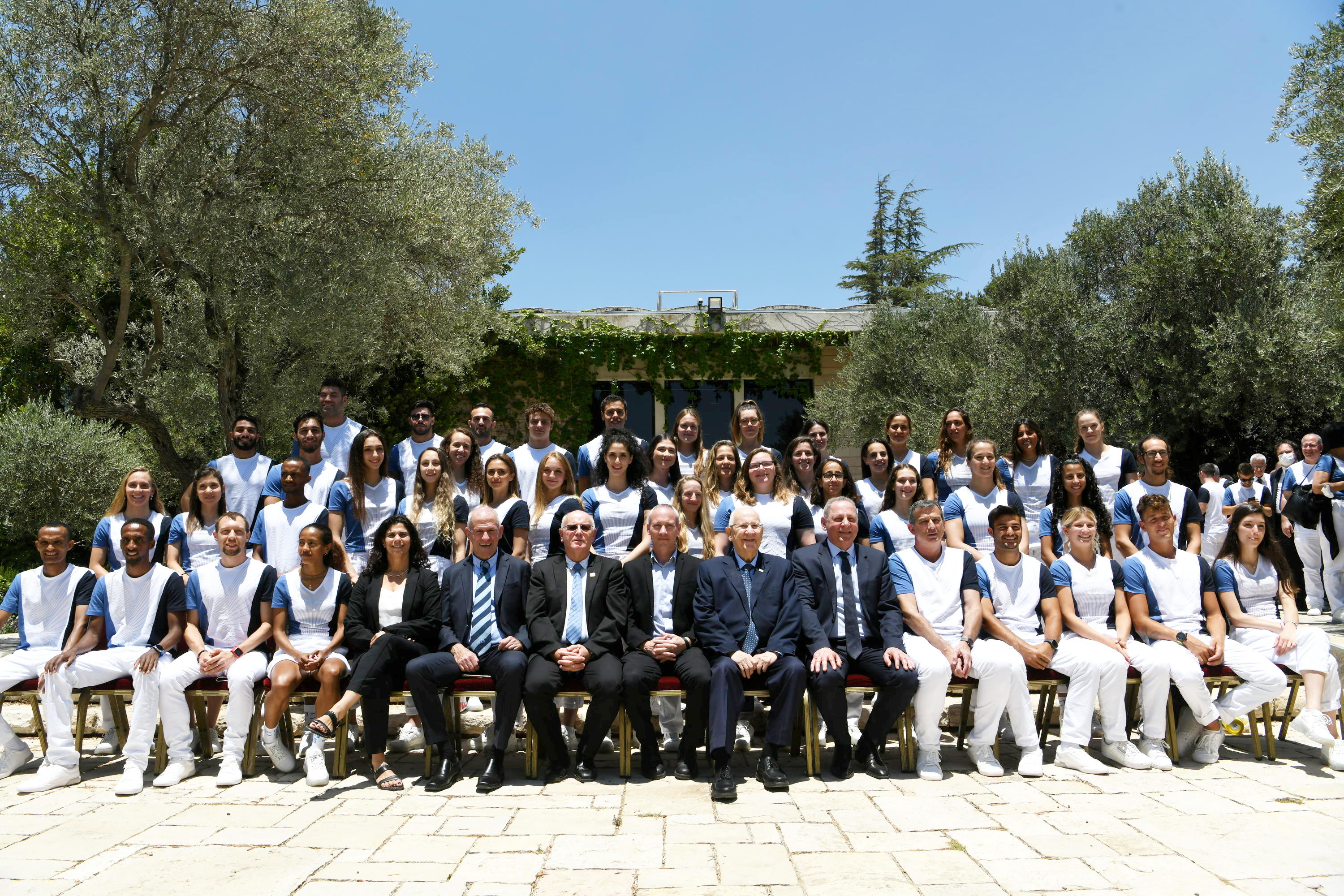
The Olympic delegation and the President of Israel, Reuven Rivlin

The Israeli delegation included 90 athletes, competing in 15 sports.

Sport	Men	Women	Total
Artistic swimming	—N/a	2	2
Archery	1	0	1
Athletics	3	6	9
Badminton	1	1	2
Baseball	24	—N/a	24
Cycling	1	1	2
Equestrian	2	2	4
Gymnastics	2	8	10
Judo	6	6	12
Sailing	1	4	5
Shooting	1	0	1
Swimming	10	3	13
Surfing	0	1	1
Taekwondo	0	1	1
Triathlon	2	0	2
Weightlifting	1	0	1
Total	55	35	90

This was Alexander Shatilov's fourth appearance at the Olympics, and Sergey Richter's, Yakov Toumarkin's, and Misha Zilberman's third appearance. Nine members of the delegation participated in the games for the second time: Lonah Chemtai Salpeter, Gili Cohen, Shlomi Haimy, Sagi Muki, Andrea Murez, Shira Rishony, Or Sasson, Marhu Teferi, and Maor Tiyouri.

This was Alberto Michán's third appearance at the Olympics, but was the first time he represented Israel. Hanna Knyazyeva-Minenko also appeared for the third time at the Olympics, but only for the second time as part of the Israeli delegation.

Seven athletes from the delegation had previously participated in the Youth Olympic Games: Linoy Ashram, Gal Cohen Groumi, Artem Dolgopyat, Anastasia Gorbenko, Denis Loktev, Avishag Semberg, and Yakov Toumarkin.

== Schedule ==
This schedule shows all the events in which Israeli athletes have participated or may participate.

All times and dates use Japan Standard Time (UTC+9)

OC	Opening ceremony	1	Event competitions	1	Medal events	EG	Exhibition gala	CC	Closing ceremony

July/August 2021		23 Fri	24 Sat	25 Sun	26 Mon	27 Tue	28 Wed	29 Thu	30 Fri	31 Sat	1 Sun	2 Mon	3 Tue	4 Wed	5 Thu	6 Fri	7 Sat	8 Sun
Ceremonies		OC																CC
Aquatics	Artistic swimming											1						
Aquatics	Marathon swimming														1			
Aquatics	Swimming		1	3	3	1	4	3	3	1								
Archery		1					1			1								
Athletics									3		1	1					2	1
Badminton			1	1	1	1												
Baseball								1	1		1	1	1					
Cycling	Road cycling			1			1											
Cycling	Mountain biking				1													
Equestrian													1	1		1		
Gymnastics	Artistic		1	1							1							
Gymnastics	Rhythmic															1	1	1
Judo			1	2	2	2	1	2	2	1								
Sailing				3	3	1	3	4	2	2	1		1	1				
Shooting				1														
Surfing				1														
Taekwondo			1															
Triathlon					1													
Weightlifting														1				
July/August 2021		23 Fri	24 Sat	25 Sun	26 Mon	27 Tue	28 Wed	29 Thu	30 Fri	31 Sat	1 Sun	2 Mon	3 Tue	4 Wed	5 Thu	6 Fri	7 Sat	8 Sun

== Archery ==
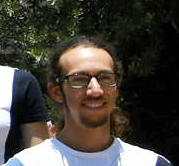
Itay Shanny

One Israeli archer qualified directly for the men's individual recurve at the Games, by reaching the quarterfinals and obtaining one of the seven available spots at the 2021 Final Qualification Tournament in Paris, France. This marked Israel's debut in Olympic archery.

Athlete	Event	Ranking round		Round of 64	Round of 32	Round of 16	Quarterfinal	Semifinal	Final / BM	
Athlete	Event	Score	Seed	Opposition Score	Opposition Score	Opposition Score	Opposition Score	Opposition Score	Opposition Score	Rank
Itay Shanny	Men's individual	635	60	Muto (JPN); W 7–3	Rai (IND); W 6–5	Tang C-c (TPE); L 5–6	Did not advance			9

== Artistic swimming ==
Israel fielded a squad of two artistic swimmers to compete in the women's duet event, by finishing sixth at the 2021 FINA Olympic Qualification Tournament in Barcelona, Spain.

Athlete	Event	Free routine (preliminary)		Technical routine			Free routine (final)		
Athlete	Event	Points	Rank	Points	Total (technical + free)	Rank	Points	Total (technical + free)	Rank
Eden Blecher; Shelly Bobritsky	Duet	84.6333	16	83.8580	168.4913	15	Did not advance		

== Athletics ==
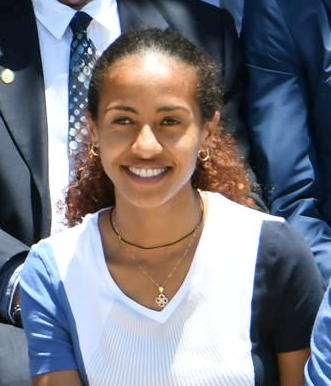
Selamawit Teferi

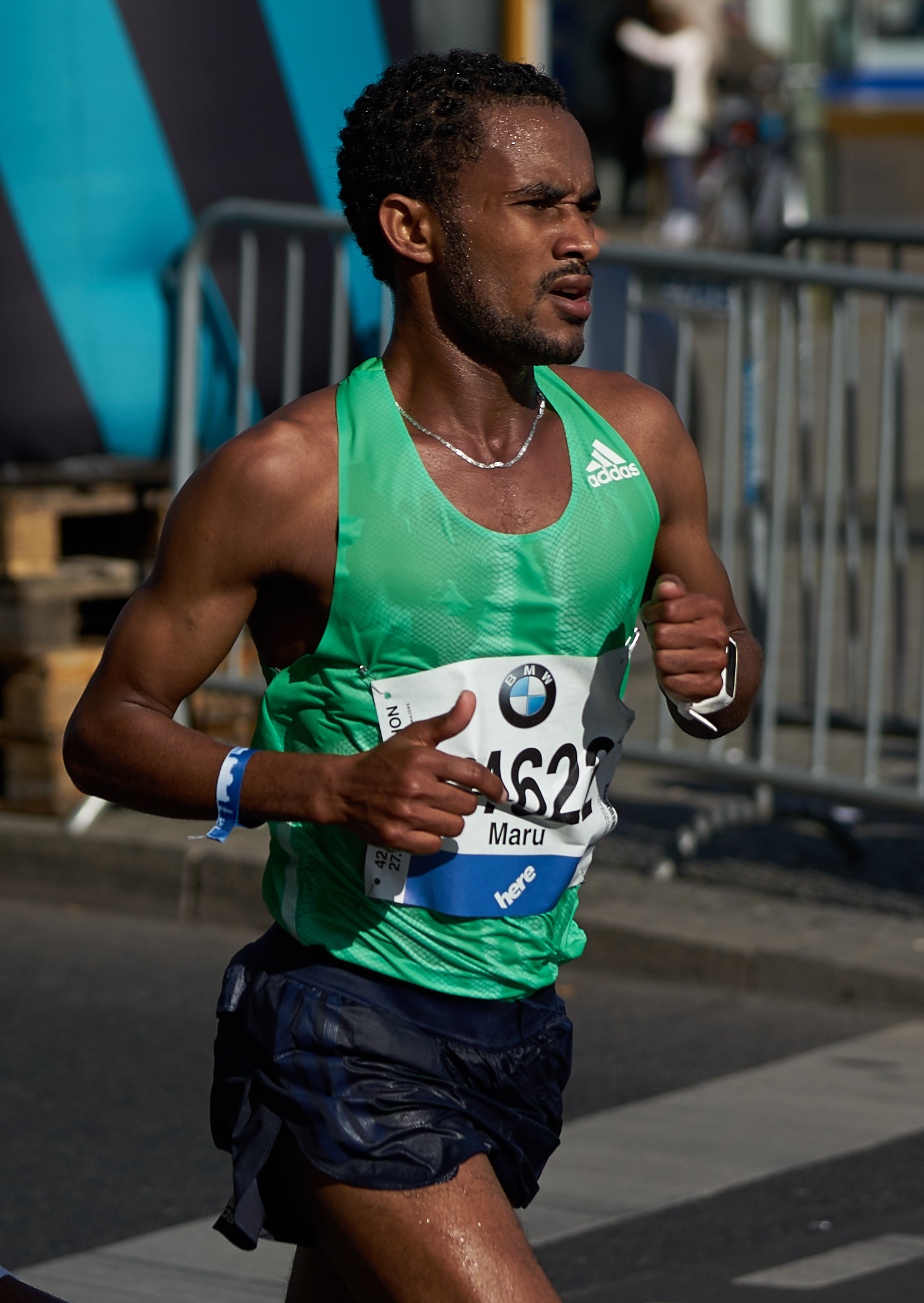
Marhu Teferi

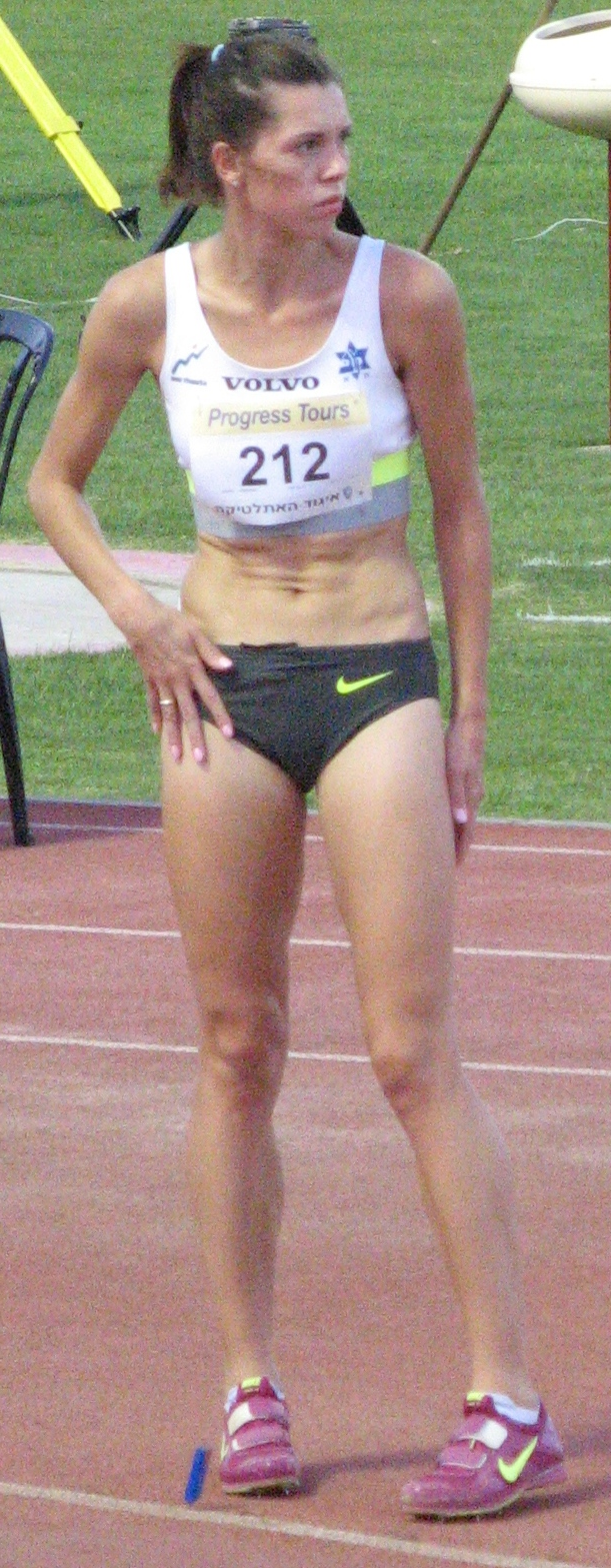
Hanna Knyazyeva-Minenko

Nine Israeli athletes met the entry standards, either by qualifying time or by world ranking, in the following track and field events (up to a maximum of 3 athletes in each event):

Key

- Q = Qualified for the next round
- q = Qualified for the next round as a fastest loser or, in field events, by position without achieving the qualifying target
- NR = National record
- SB = Season Best
- N/A = Round not applicable for the event

Track & road events
Men

Athlete	Event	Final	
Athlete	Event	Result	Rank
Haimro Alame	Marathon	2:17:17	37
Girmaw Amare	Marathon	2:16:17	28
Marhu Teferi	Marathon	2:13:02	13

Women

Athlete	Event	Heat		Quarterfinal		Semifinal		Final	
Athlete	Event	Result	Rank	Result	Rank	Result	Rank	Result	Rank
Diana Vaisman	100 m	Bye		11.27 SB	4	Did not advance			
Selamawit Dagnachew	5000 m	14:53.43 NR	8 q	—N/a				14:54.39	10
Selamawit Dagnachew	10000 m	—N/a						32:46.46	23
Adva Cohen	3000 m steeplechase	10:05.95	14	—N/a				Did not advance	
Lonah Chemtai Salpeter	Marathon	—N/a						2:48:31	66
Maor Tiyouri	Marathon	—N/a						2:37:52	48

Field events

Athlete	Event	Qualification		Final	
Athlete	Event	Distance	Position	Distance	Position
Hanna Knyazyeva-Minenko	Women's triple jump	14.36 SB	8 q	14.60 SB	6

== Badminton ==
Israel entered two badminton players (one per gender) into the Olympic tournament. Misha Zilberman and Ksenia Polikarpova were selected to compete at the Games each in the men's and women's singles based on the BWF World Race to Tokyo Rankings.

Athlete	Event	Group Stage			Elimination	Quarterfinal	Semifinal	Final / BM	
Athlete	Event	Opposition Score	Opposition Score	Rank	Opposition Score	Opposition Score	Opposition Score	Opposition Score	Rank
Misha Zilberman	Men's singles	Sai Praneeth (IND); W (21–17, 21–15)	Caljouw (NED); L (21–17, 9–21, 10–21)	2	Did not advance				15
Ksenia Polikarpova	Women's singles	Sindhu (IND); L (7–21, 10–21)	Cheung N-y (HKG); L (15–21, 21–15, 16–21)	3	Did not advance				15

== Baseball ==
The current Israel national baseball team that competes at the 2020 Summer Olympics is composed mostly of American Jews with only four Israeli-born players.

The Israel national baseball team qualified for the Olympics by winning the gold medal at the 2019 WSBC Africa and Europe Qualification Tournament in Italy and securing an outright berth, marking the country's Olympic debut in baseball.

Team	Group Stage			Round 1	Round 2	Round 1 repechage	Final / BM	
Team	Opposition Score	Opposition Score	Rank	Opposition Score	Opposition Score	Opposition Score	Opposition Score	Rank
National baseball team	South Korea; L (5–6)	United States; L (1–8)	3	Mexico; W (12–5)	South Korea; L (1–11)	Dominican Republic; L (6–7)	Did not advance	5

Team roster

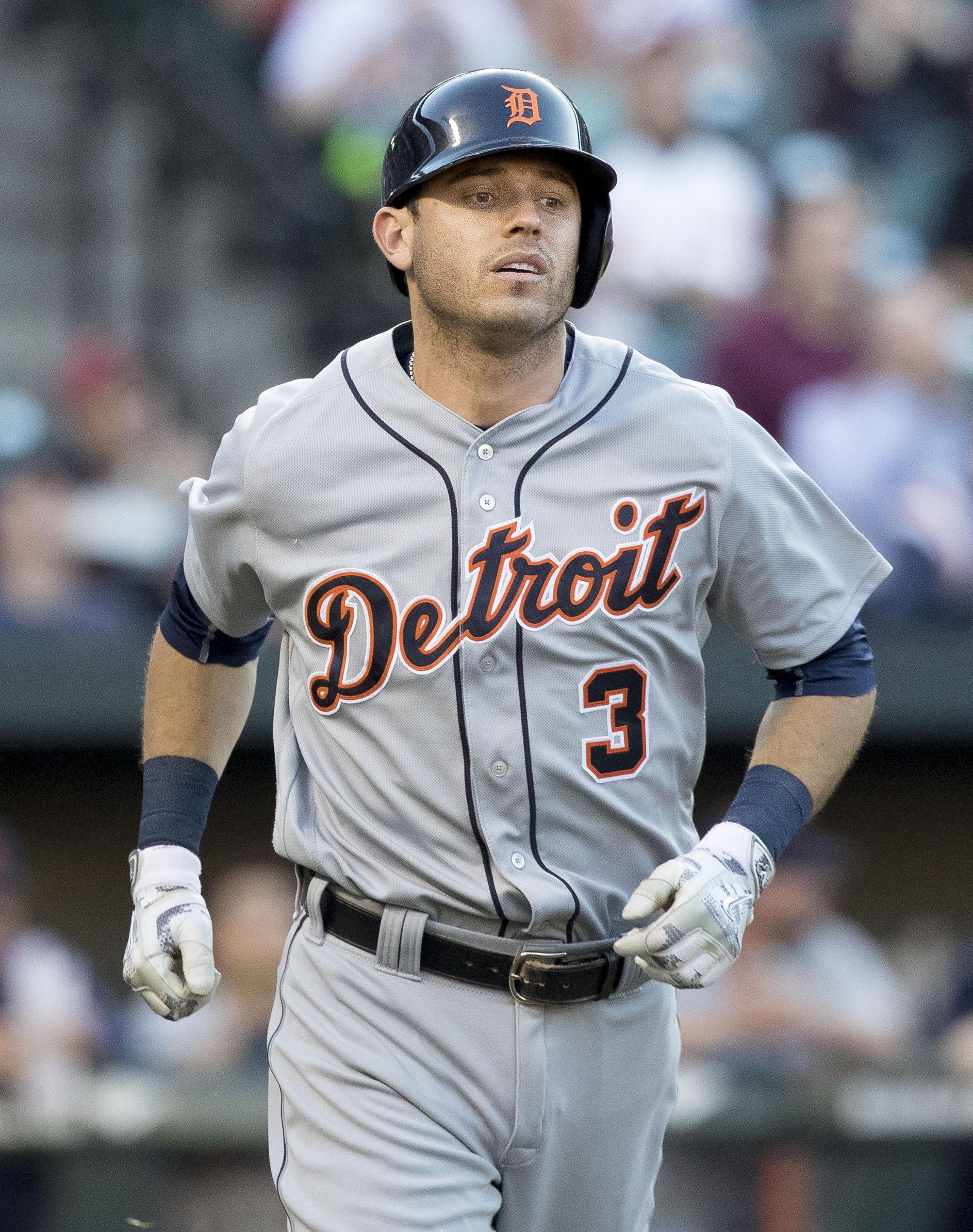
Ian Kinsler

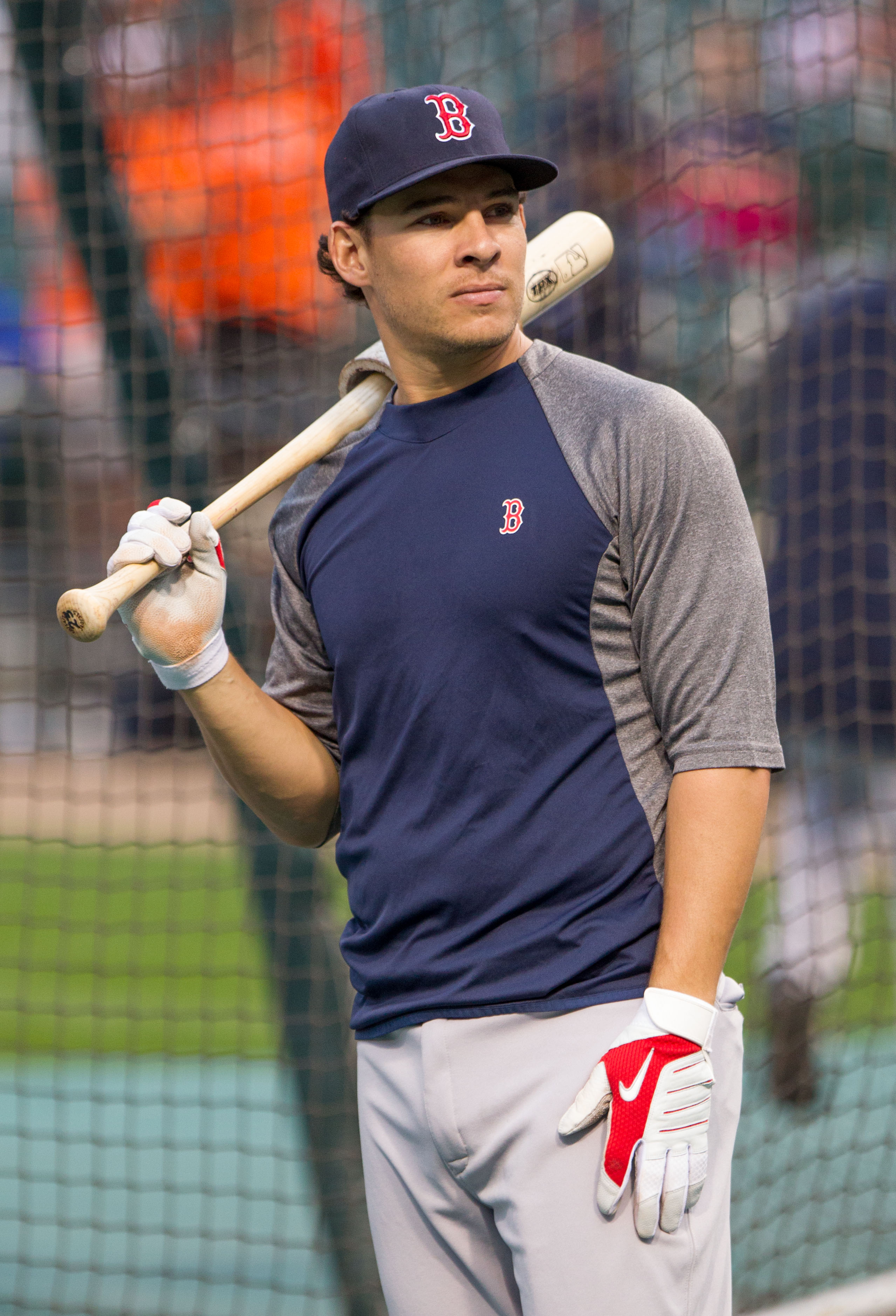
Danny Valencia

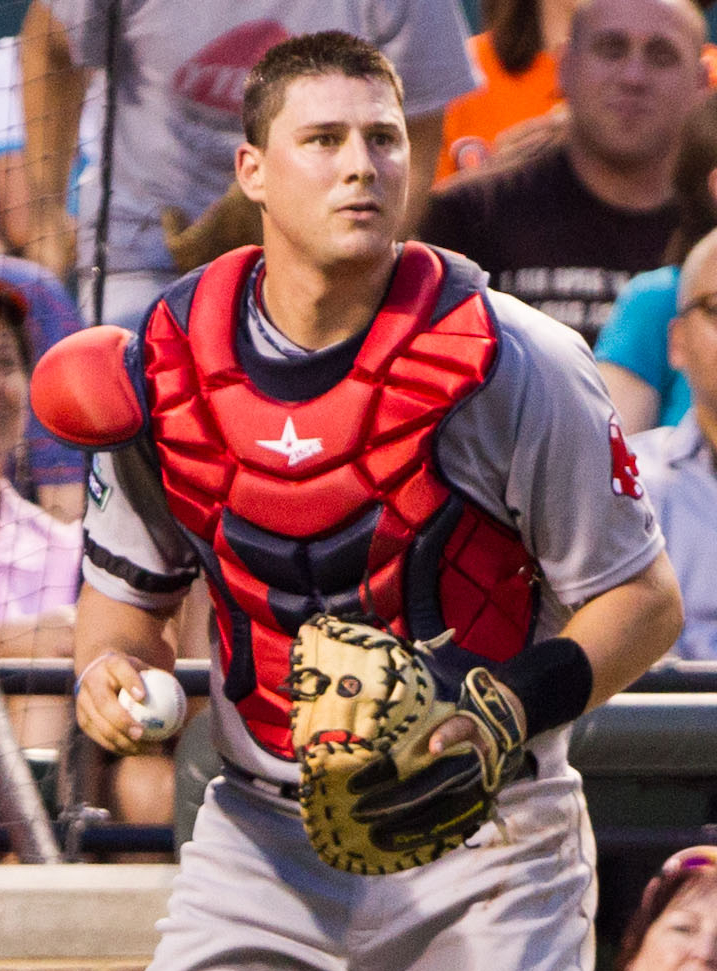
Ryan Lavarnway

The Israel Association of Baseball announced the team's final roster on July 5, 2021. The team is composed mostly of American Jews with only four Israeli-born players.

Player	No.	Pos.	Date of birth (age)	Team	League	Birthplace
D. J. Sharabi	10	P	March 7, 1992 (age 29)	(United States) Sioux Falls Canaries	(United States) American Association	(United States) San Mateo, California
Shlomo Lipetz	12	P	February 11, 1979 (age 42)	Free agent		(Israel) Tel Aviv
Joey Wagman	14	P	July 25, 1991 (age 30)	(Czech Republic) Tempo Praha	(Czech Republic) Czech Baseball Extraliga	(United States) Walnut Creek, California
Jake Fishman	17	P	February 8, 1995 (age 26)	(United States) Miami Marlins (minors)	(United States) Minor League Baseball	(United States) Newton, Massachusetts
Jonathan de Marte	21	P	April 29, 1993 (age 28)	Free agent		(United States) Yorktown Heights, New York
Ben Wanger	23	P	April 7, 1997 (age 24)	(United States) Miami Hurricanes	(United States) NCAA Division 1	(United States) Newton, Massachusetts
Jon Moscot	27	P	August 15, 1991 (age 29)	Free agent		(United States) Santa Monica, California
Josh Zeid	28	P	March 24, 1987 (age 34)	Free agent		(United States) New Haven, Connecticut
Alon Leichman	29	P	May 29, 1989 (age 32)	Free agent		(Israel) Kibbutz Gezer
Jeremy Bleich	30	P	June 18, 1987 (age 34)	Free agent		(United States) Metairie, Louisiana
Zack Weiss	44	P	June 16, 1992 (age 29)	(United States) Seattle Mariners (minors)	(United States) Minor League Baseball	(United States) Irvine, California
Alex Katz	47	P	October 12, 1994 (age 26)	(United States) Chicago Cubs (minors)	(United States) Minor League Baseball	(United States) Manhasset, New York
Tal Erel	7	C	June 16, 1996 (age 25)	(United States) Lynn Fighting Knights	(United States) NCAA Division 2	(Israel) Ramat Gan
Nick Rickles	9	C	February 2, 1990 (age 30)	Free agent		(United States) Fort Lauderdale, Florida
Ryan Lavarnway	36	C	August 7, 1987 (age 33)	(United States) Cleveland Indians (minors)	(United States) Minor League Baseball	(United States) Burbank, California
Ian Kinsler	3	IF	June 22, 1982 (age 39)	(United States) Long Island Ducks	(United States) American Association	(United States) Tucson, Arizona
Zach Penprase	6	IF	February 16, 1985 (age 36)	(United States) New York Boulders	(United States) Frontier League	(United States) Moorpark, California
Scott Burcham	8	IF	June 17, 1993 (age 28)	(United States) Colorado Rockies (minors)	(United States) Minor League Baseball	(United States) Phoenix, Arizona
Ty Kelly	11	IF	July 20, 1988 (age 33)	(United States) Seattle Mariners (minors)	(United States) Minor League Baseball	(United States) Dallas, Texas
Danny Valencia	19	IF	September 19, 1984 (age 36)	(United States) Long Island Ducks	(United States) American Association	(United States) Miami, Florida
Mitch Glasser	22	IF	October 15, 1989 (age 31)	(United States) Sioux Falls Canaries	(United States) American Association	(United States) Chicago, Illinois
Blake Gailen	2	OF	March 27, 1985 (age 36)	(United States) Lancaster Barnstormers	(United States) Atlantic League	(United States) Verdugo Hills, California
Robb Paller	4	OF	May 21, 1993 (age 28)	(United States) Colorado Springs Snow Sox	(United States) Pecos League	(United States) Brooklyn, New York
Assaf Lowengart	24	OF	March 1, 1998 (age 23)	(United States) Mansfield Mountaineers	(United States) NCAA Division 2	(Israel) Timorim

Group play

Pos	Team	Pld	W	L	RF	RA	RD	PCT	GB	Qualification
1	United States	2	2	0	12	3	+9	1.000	—	Round 2
2	South Korea	2	1	1	8	9	−1	.500	1	Round 1 game #2
3	Israel	2	0	2	6	14	−8	.000	2	Round 1 game #1

Source: TOCOG and WBSC

29 July 19:00 Yokohama Stadium
Team	1	2	3	4	5	6	7	8	9	10	R	H	E
Israel	0	0	2	0	0	2	0	0	1	0	5	7	0
South Korea	0	0	0	2	0	0	3	0	0	1	6	11	0
WP: Oh Seung-hwan (1–0) LP: Jeremy Bleich (0–1); Home runs: ISR: Ian Kinsler (1), Ryan Lavarnway 2 (2); KOR: Oh Ji-hwan (1), Lee Jung-hoo (1), Hyun-soo Kim (1); Boxscore

30 July 19:00 Yokohama Stadium
Team	1	2	3	4	5	6	7	8	9	R	H	E
United States	0	0	3	0	0	1	2	1	1	8	11	0
Israel	0	0	0	1	0	0	0	0	0	1	7	2
WP: Joe Ryan (1–0) LP: Joey Wagman (0–1); Home runs: USA: Tyler Austin (1); ISR: Danny Valencia (1); Boxscore

Round 1

1 August 12:00 Yokohama Stadium
Team	1	2	3	4	5	6	7	8	9	R	H	E
Israel	1	0	5	0	0	0	6	0	0	12	12	0
Mexico	0	0	4	0	0	1	0	0	0	5	8	1
WP: Zack Weiss (1–0) LP: Manny Barreda (0–1); Home runs: ISR: Danny Valencia (2); MEX: None; Boxscore

Round 2

2 August 12:00 Yokohama Stadium
Team	1	2	3	4	5	6	7	8	9	R	H	E
Israel	0	0	0	0	1	0	0	X	X	1	3	2
South Korea (7)	1	2	0	0	7	0	1	X	X	11	18	0
WP: Cho Sang-woo (1–0) LP: Joey Wagman (0–2); Home runs: ISR: None; KOR: Oh Ji-hwan (2), Hyun-soo Kim (2); Boxscore

Round 1 repechage

3 August 19:00 Yokohama Stadium
Team	1	2	3	4	5	6	7	8	9	R	H	E
Israel	0	0	0	0	4	0	0	2	0	6	9	2
Dominican Republic	1	0	1	0	0	2	1	0	2	7	9	1
WP: Luis Felipe Castillo (1–1) LP: Zack Weiss (1–1); Home runs: ISR: Danny Valencia (3); DOM: Jeison Guzman (1), Johan Mieses (1); Boxscore

== Cycling ==
=== Road ===
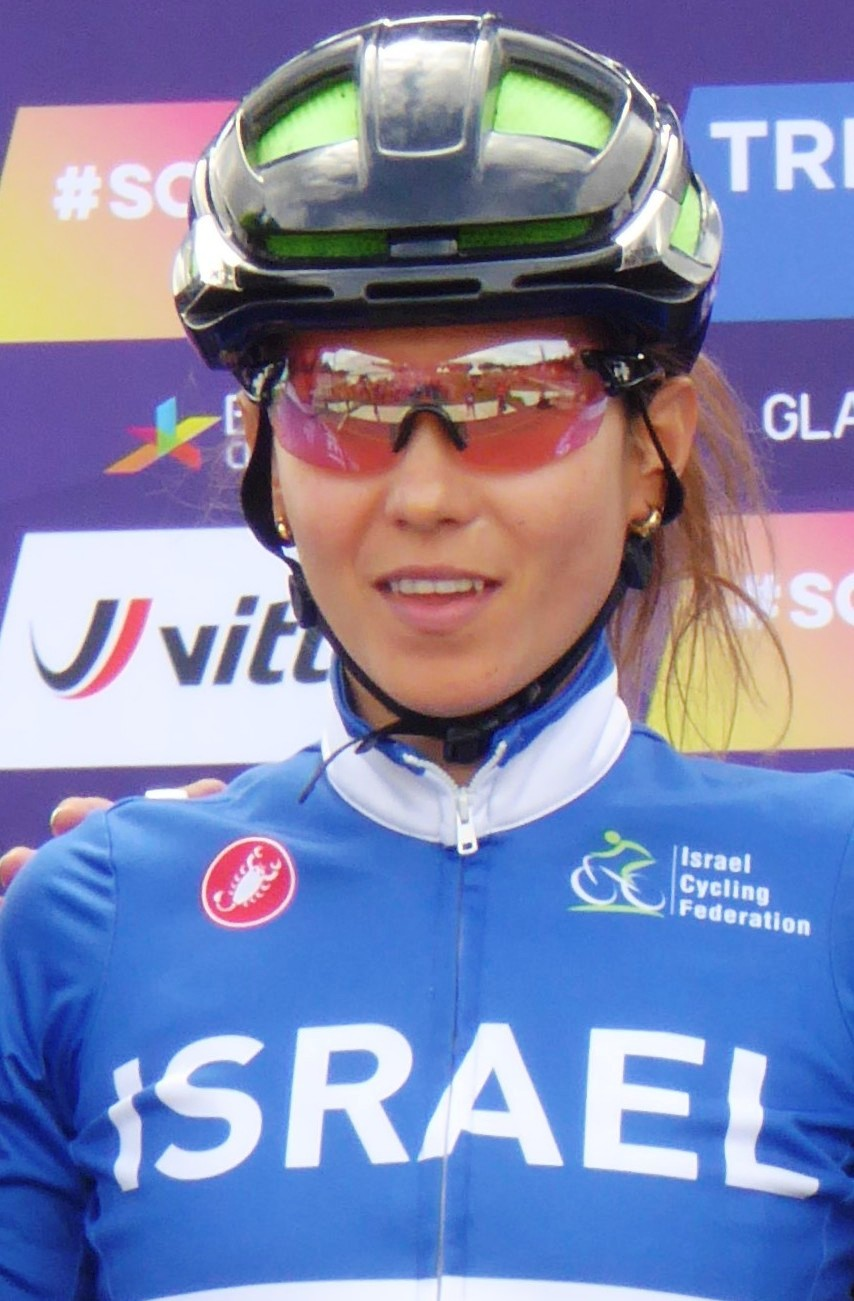
Omer Shapira

Israeli road cyclist Omer Shapira ranked 60th in the Individual UCI World Ranking for women with 316.17 points and won a quota for Israel. Shapira also finished 13th at the Women individual time trial event at the 2019 UCI Road World Championships, but after decreasing to one athlete per country, Shapira placed eighth. The first 10 places automatically qualified their country to the women's individual time trial event. The Israel Cycling Federation decided that Shapira would be the Israeli road cyclist representative for the games.

Athlete	Event	Time	Rank
Omer Shapira	Women's road race	3:55:23	24
Omer Shapira	Women's time trial	33:15.84	15

=== Mountain biking ===
Israel qualified one men mountain biker based on the 2019 UCI Mountain Bike World Championships when Shlomi Haimy finished in 30th place. Israel was the second-highest ranked country which had not yet qualified any quota places through the UCI Olympic Mountain Biking rankings. The Israel Cycling Federation decided that Haimy would be the Israeli mountain biker representative for the games.

Athlete	Event	Time	Rank
Shlomi Haimy	Men's cross-country	1:36:58	33

== Equestrian ==
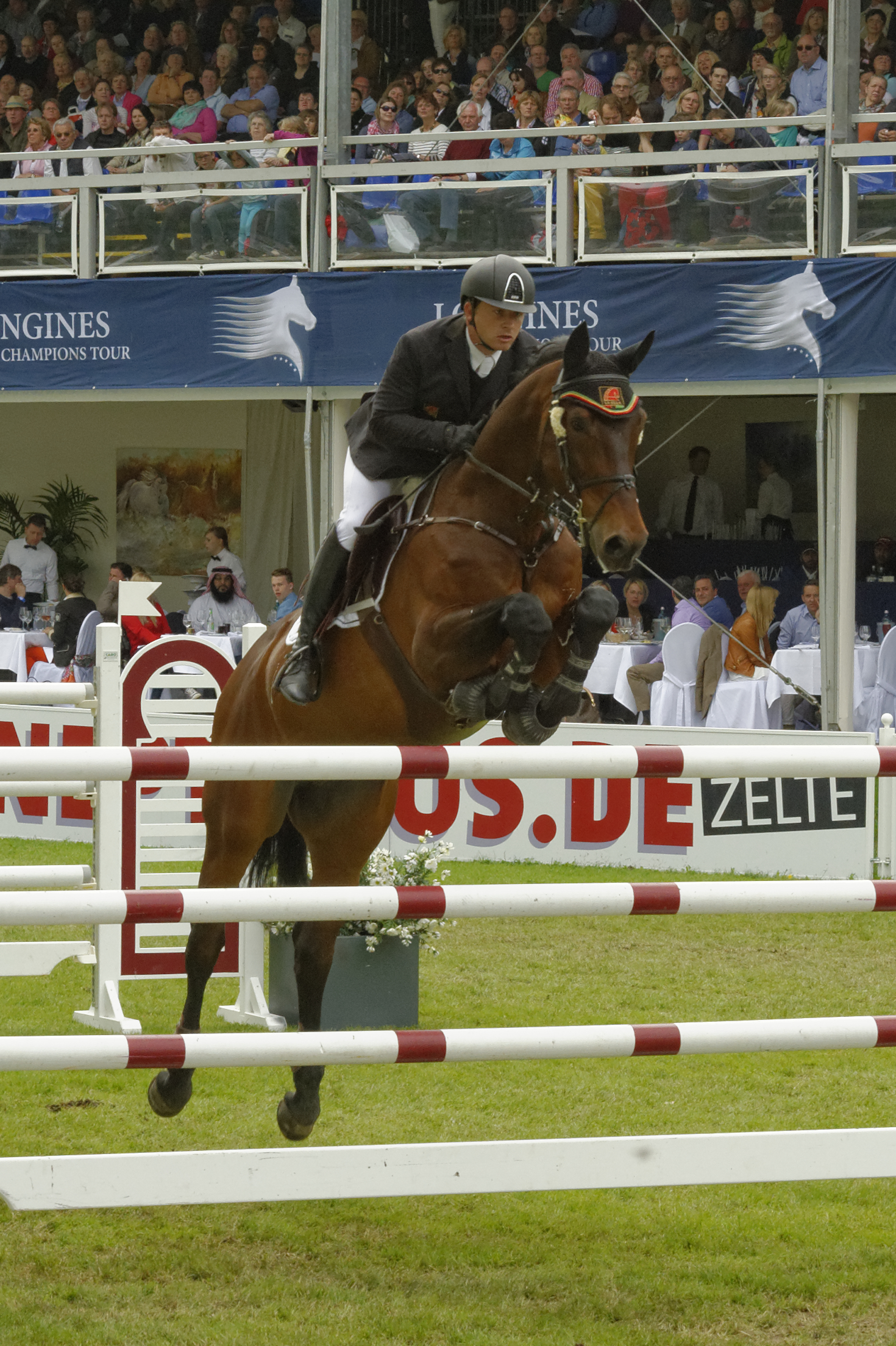
Alberto Michán Halbinger

Israel fielded a squad of three equestrian riders in the Olympic team jumping competition. In July 2019, Team Israel's Daniel Bluman, Ashlee Bond, Danielle G. Waldman, and Elad Yaniv won the Olympic Jumping Qualifier at Maxima Park in Moscow, qualifying for the Tokyo Olympics, the first time that Israel has earned a place in the Olympics in equestrian. However, due to a technicality regarding the registration of his horse Gemma W, Bluman was deemed ineligible to compete just weeks prior to the start of the competition. The Israel Equestrian Federation decided that Ashlee Bond, Alberto Michán, Danielle G. Waldman, and Teddy Vlock would represent Israel at the games, with the identity of the three riders who would participate in each day's event to be determined the day before.

=== Jumping ===
Danielle G. Waldman and Queensland E have been named the traveling alternates.

Athlete	Horse	Event	Qualification		Final		
Athlete	Horse	Event	Penalties	Rank	Penalties	Time	Rank
Ashlee Bond	Donatello	Individual	0	=1 Q	5	88.02	11
Alberto Michán	Cosa Nostra	Individual	Eliminated		Did not advance		
Teddy Vlock	Amsterdam	Individual	6	42	Did not advance		
Ashlee Bond; Alberto Michán; Teddy Vlock	See above	Team	Eliminated		Did not advance		

== Gymnastics ==
=== Artistic ===
Israel entered two artistic gymnasts into the Olympic competition. Three-time Olympian Alexander Shatilov booked a spot in the men's individual all-around and apparatus events, by finishing seventh out of the 12 gymnasts eligible for qualification at the 2019 World Championships in Stuttgart, Germany, while Artem Dolgopyat secured one of the three places available for individual-based gymnasts, neither part of the team nor qualified through the all-around, in the floor exercise at the same tournament.

Lihie Raz received a spare berth from the women's apparatus event, as one of the female gymnasts from the individual all-around, not yet qualified, at the 2019 World Championships. Raz qualified for the floor final at the 2020 European Women's Artistic Gymnastics Championships and thus met the Israeli criteria set by the Israeli Gymnastics Federation and ensured her participation in the Olympic Games.

Men

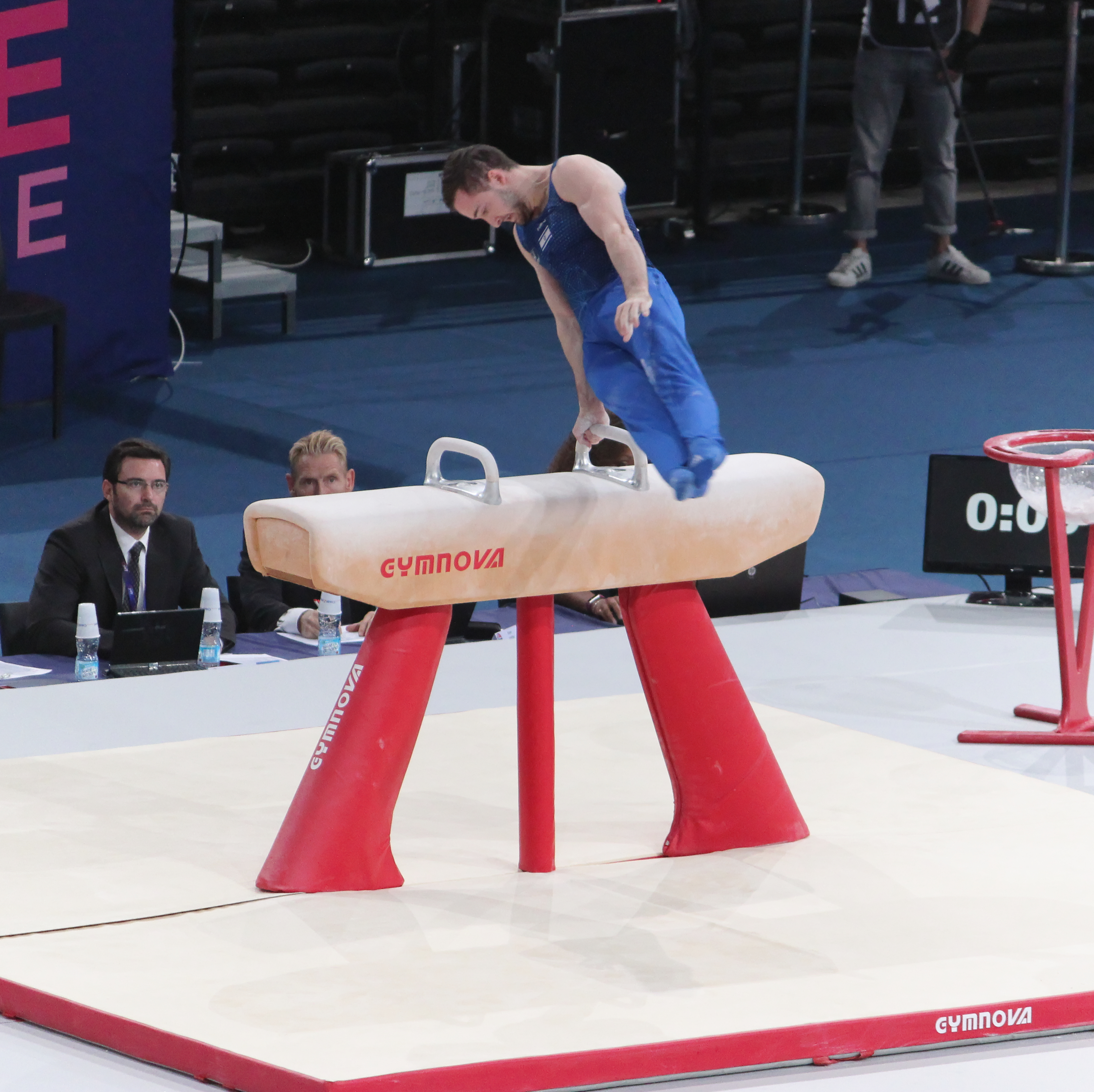
Artem Dolgopyat

Athlete	Event	Qualification								Final							
Athlete	Event	Apparatus						Total	Rank	Apparatus						Total	Rank
Athlete	Event	F	PH	R	V	PB	HB	Total	Rank	F	PH	R	V	PB	HB	Total	Rank
Artem Dolgopyat	Floor	15.200	—N/a					15.200	1 Q	14.933	—N/a					14.933	1st place, gold medalist(s)
Artem Dolgopyat	Pommel horse	—N/a	12.766	—N/a				12.766	56	Did not advance							
Alexander Shatilov	Floor	13.500	—N/a					13.500	47	Did not advance							

Women

Athlete	Event	Qualification						Final					
Athlete	Event	Apparatus				Total	Rank	Apparatus				Total	Rank
Athlete	Event	V (Note: Gymnasts who wanted to qualify for the vault final performed a second vault, with the average of the two counting for event final qualification. Only the first vault counted for individual and team all-around qualification.)	UB	BB	F	Total	Rank	V	UB	BB	F	Total	Rank
Lihie Raz	All-around	13.899	11.700	12.066	12.400	50.399	59	Did not advance					

=== Rhythmic ===
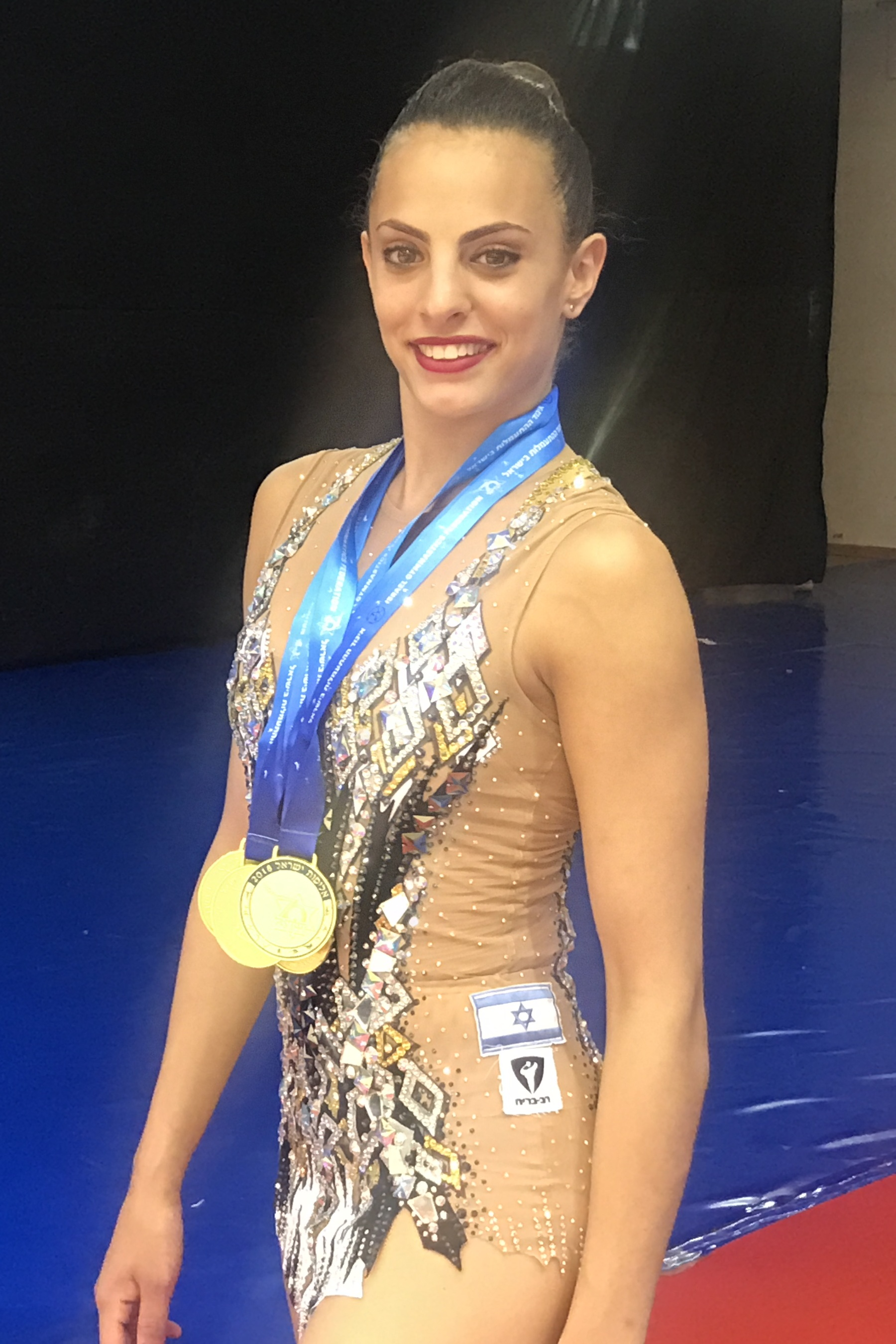
Linoy Ashram

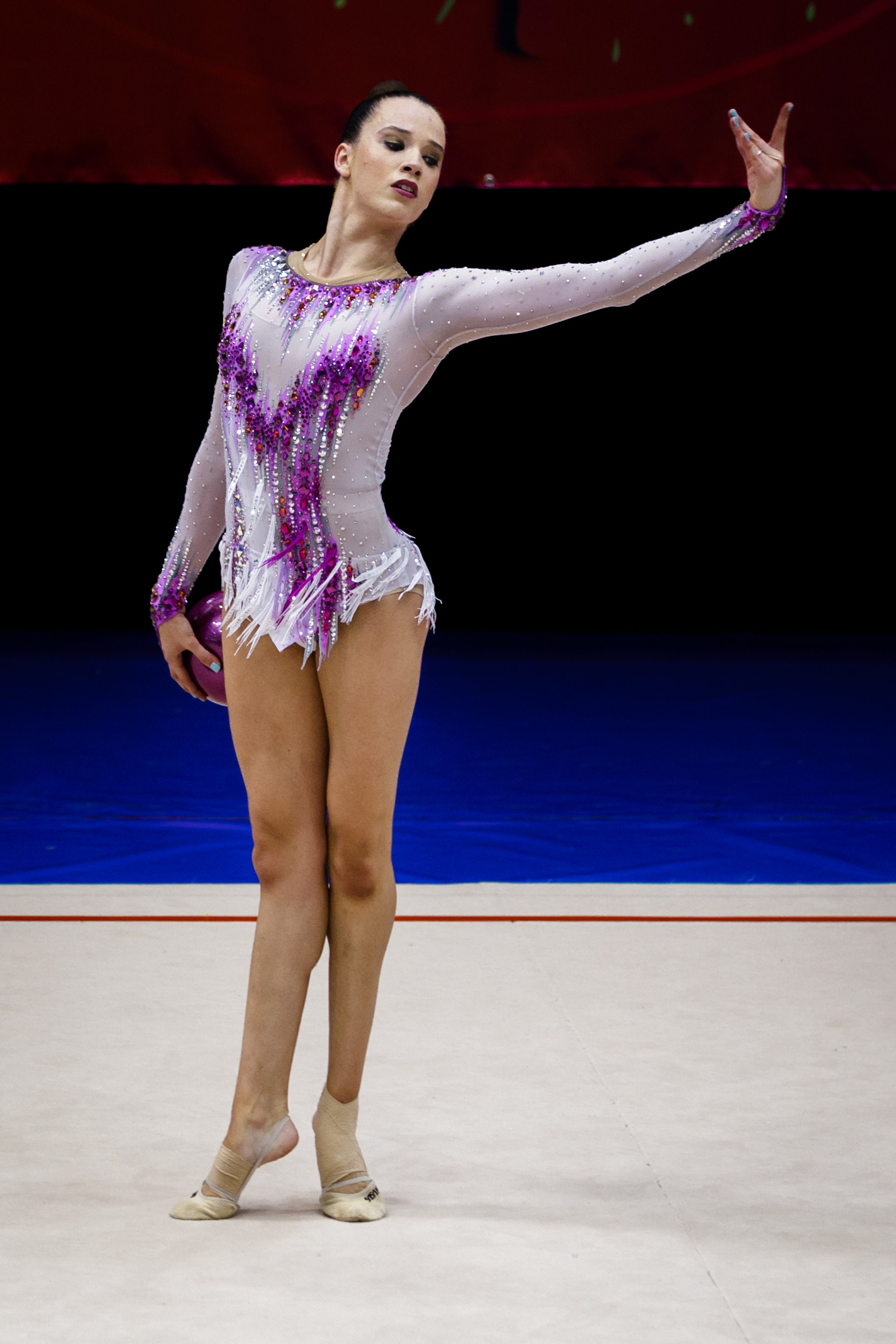
Nicol Zelikman

Linoy Ashram and Nicol Zelikman secured two quotas for the Israeli delegation by finishing third and eleventh, respectively, at the 2019 World Championships all-around individual event. Also, Israel qualified a squad of rhythmic gymnasts for the group all-around by virtue of finishing within the top-five among National Olympic Committees that are not yet qualified at the 2019 World Championships.

Athlete	Event	Qualification						Final					
Athlete	Event	Hoop	Ball	Clubs	Ribbon	Total	Rank	Hoop	Ball	Clubs	Ribbon	Total	Rank
Linoy Ashram	Individual	23.500	28.250	27.850	23.500	103.100	3 Q	27.550	28.300	28.650	23.300	107.800	1st place, gold medalist(s)
Nicol Zelikman	Individual	24.350	25.500	24.950	21.100	95.900	7 Q	23.700	24.150	25.600	22.150	95.600	7

Athletes	Event	Qualification				Final			
Athletes	Event	5 apps	3+2 apps	Total	Rank	5 apps.	3+2 apps	Total	Rank
Ofir Dayan; Yana Kramarenko; Natalie Raits; Yuliana Telegina; Karin Vexman	Group	44.000	40.650	84.650	4 Q	44.100	39.750	83.850	6

== Judo ==
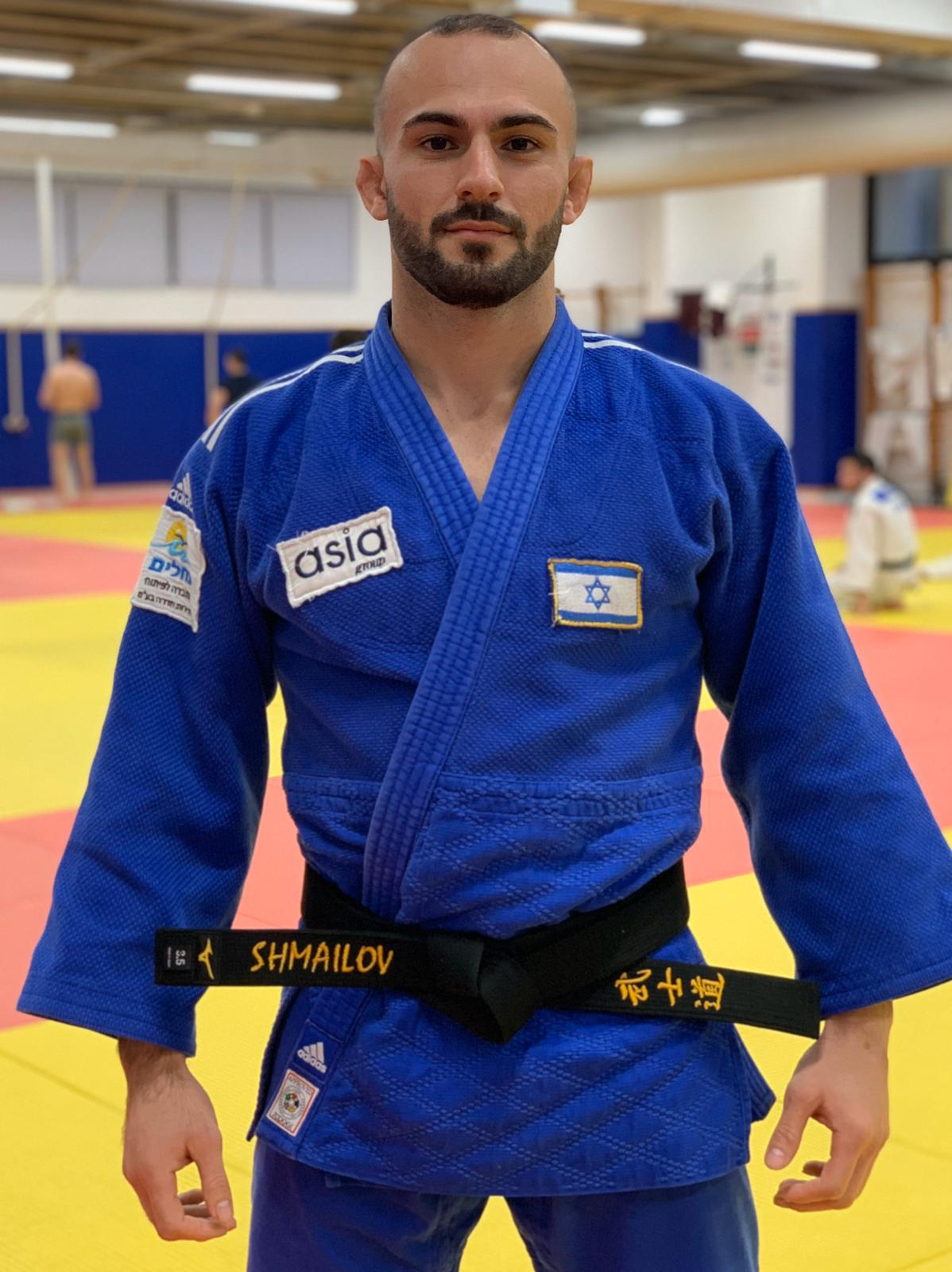
Baruch Shmailov

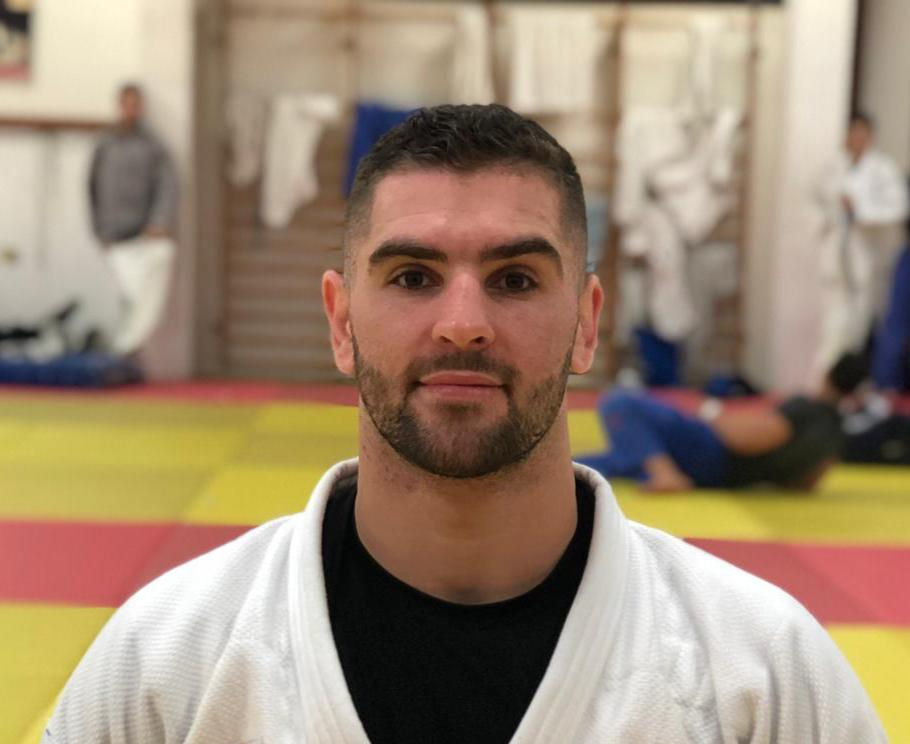
Peter Paltchik

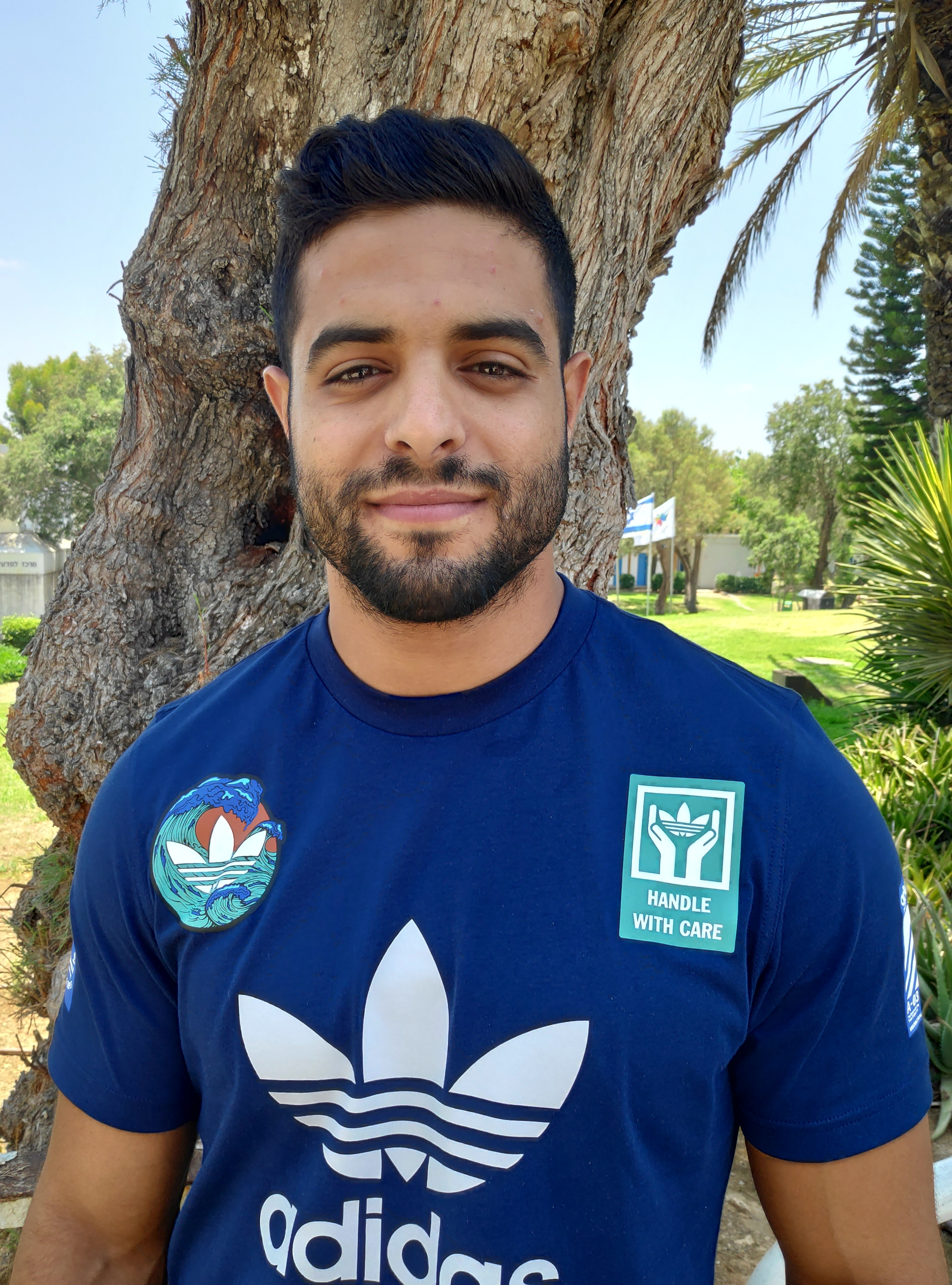
Sagi Muki

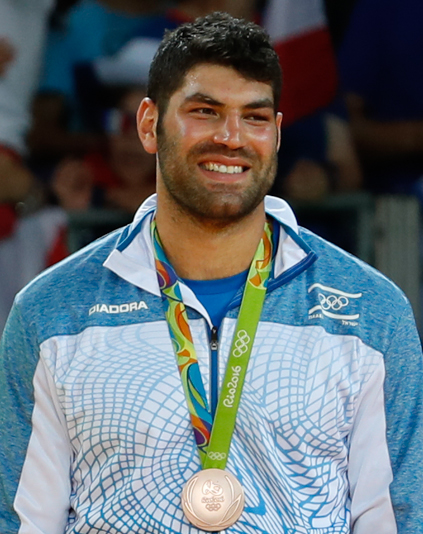
Or Sasson

Israel qualified a squad of 12 judoka (six men and six women) for each of the following weight classes at the Games by the IJF World Ranking List of 28 June 2021.

Men

Athlete	Event	Round of 64	Round of 32	Round of 16	Quarterfinals	Semifinals	Repechage	Final / BM	Rank
Athlete	Event	Opposition Result	Opposition Result	Opposition Result	Opposition Result	Opposition Result	Opposition Result	Opposition Result	Rank
Baruch Shmailov	−66 kg	—N/a	Loforte (MOZ); W 11–00s1	Katz (AUS); W 01–00	Margvelashvili (GEO); L 00–10	Did not advance	Gomboc (SLO); W 01–00s1	Cargnin (BRA); L 00s1–01s1	5
Tohar Butbul	−73 kg	Bye	No competitor W 10–00 (FG)	Sterpu (MDA); W 10–00	An C-r (KOR); L 00s1–01s1	Did not advance	Margelidon (CAN); L 00–10s2	Did not advance	7
Sagi Muki	−81 kg	Bye	Santos (BRA); W 10–00	Borchashvili (AUT); L 00s2-01s2	Did not advance				9
Li Kochman	−90 kg	Bye	Klammert (CZE); W 10–00s1	Bekauri (GEO); L 01s1-10	Did not advance				9
Peter Paltchik	−100 kg	—N/a	Bye	Lkhagvasürengiin (MGL); W 01s1–00s2	Wolf (JPN); L 00s1–01s1	Did not advance	El Nahas (CAN); L 00–10s1	Did not advance	7
Or Sasson	+100 kg	—N/a	Bye	Riner (FRA); L 00–01	Did not advance				9

Women

Athlete	Event	Round of 32	Round of 16	Quarterfinals	Semifinals	Repechage	Final / BM	Rank
Athlete	Event	Opposition Result	Opposition Result	Opposition Result	Opposition Result	Opposition Result	Opposition Result	Rank
Shira Rishony	−48 kg	Álvarez (COL); W 10–00	Figueroa (ESP); W 10–00	Mönkhbat (MGL); L 00–11	Did not advance	Lin C-h (TPE); W 10s1–00s2	Bilodid (UKR); L 00s1–10s1	5
Gili Cohen	−52 kg	Babamuratova (TKM); W 10s1–00	Van Snick (BEL); L 00–10	Did not advance				9
Timna Nelson-Levy	−57 kg	Bye	Perišić (SRB); W 10s1–00s3	Yoshida (JPN); L 00s1–01	Did not advance	Kajzer (SLO); L 00–10s2	Did not advance	7
Gili Sharir	−63 kg	Haecker (AUS); L 00s3–10s2	Did not advance					17
Inbar Lanir	−78 kg	Otgon (MGL); W 10–00	Aguiar (BRA); L 00–10	Did not advance				9
Raz Hershko	+78 kg	Alqahtani (KSA); W 11–00	Sone (JPN); L 00–11	Did not advance				9

Mixed

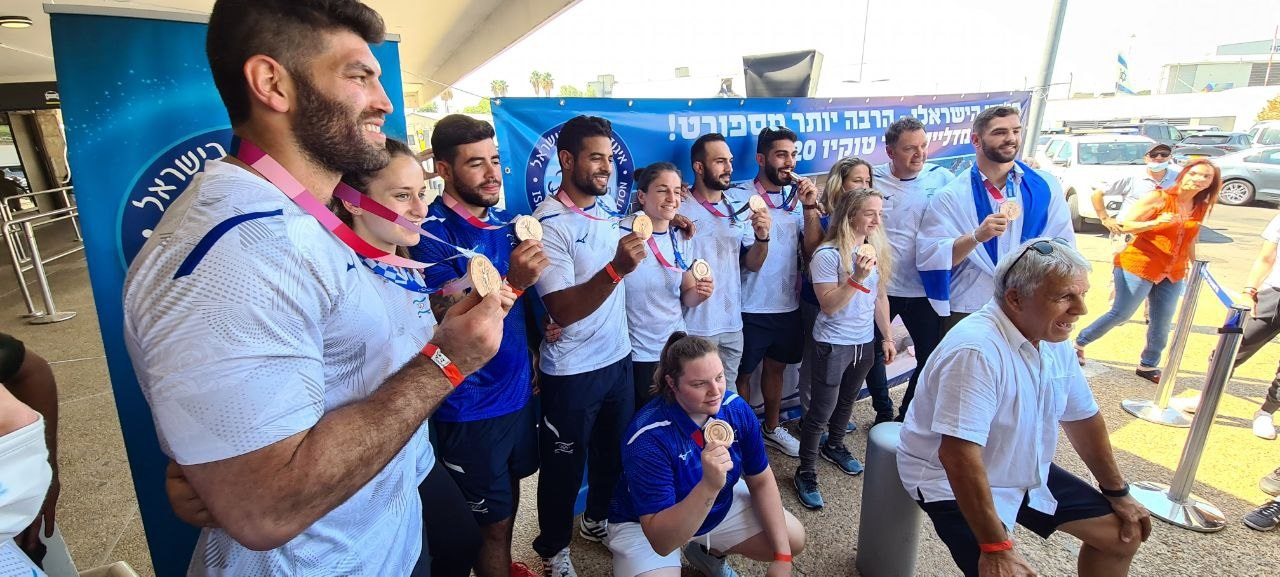
The Israel national judo team members, wearing their bronze medals from the 2020 Summer Olympics Mixed Team event in 2021

The Tokyo games hosted the first Judo Mixed team event. Nations qualifying at least one athlete in the −57 (−48, −52 & -57), −70 (−57, −63 & -70) & +70 (−70, −78 & +78) weight categories for women, and at least one athlete in the −73 (−60, −66 & -73), −90 (−73, −81 & -90) & +90 (−90, −100 & +100) weight categories for men, would compete in the team event. The Israeli team has qualified to the event, and won a bronze medal.

Team	Event	Round of 16	Quarterfinals	Semifinals	Repechage	Final / BM	Rank
Team	Event	Opposition Result	Opposition Result	Opposition Result	Opposition Result	Opposition Result	Rank
Tohar Butbul; Raz Hershko; Li Kochman; Inbar Lanir; Sagi Muki; Timna Nelson-Levy; Peter Paltchik; Shira Rishony; Or Sasson; Gili Sharir; Baruch Shmailov	Team	Italy; W 4–3	France; L 3–4	Did not advance	Brazil; W 4–2	ROC; W 4–1	3rd place, bronze medalist(s)

== Sailing ==
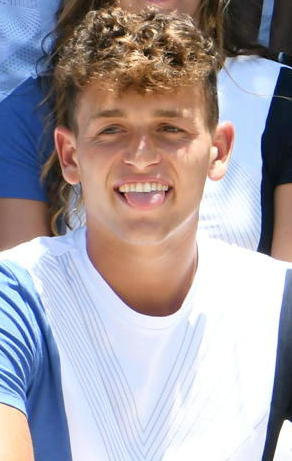
Yoav Cohen

Israeli sailors qualified three boats in each of the following classes. Gil Cohen and Noa Lasry secured a quota for the Israeli delegation by finishing eleventh in the women's 470 event at the 2018 Sailing World Championships in Aarhus, Denmark. Ofek Elimelech and Mia Morris finished twelfth and fourteenth in their respective RS:X class. Both of these results promised two more quotas for the Israeli delegation. Shay Kakon secured another quota for the Israeli delegation through the Europe Laser Radial qualification event in Vilamoura, Portugal.

Katy Spychakov secured her place on the Israeli squad, after she topped the overall ranking of Israel's selection meets. Yoav Cohen finished in fifth place at the 2021 RS:X World Championships and tied with Shahar Tzuberi in Israel's selection ranking. Gur Steinberg, the team's coach, decided that Cohen would be the representative for the Games instead of Zubari, who had been chosen before the postponement of the Olympics. Shahar Tibi and Noya Bar Am were chosen to represent Israel in the 470 event, while Kakon was selected in the women's Laser Radial.

Athlete	Event	Race													Net Points	Rank
Athlete	Event	1	2	3	4	5	6	7	8	9	10	11	12	M	Net Points	Rank
Yoav Cohen	Men's RS:X	12	6	2	7	6	6	6	7	~~16~~	6	4	12	2	76	4
Katy Spychakov	Women's RS:X	3	5	9	7	10	3	~~13~~	13	9	1	4	1	20	85	6
Shai Kakon	Women's Laser Radial	~~39~~	13	38	18	39	32	34	39	2	5	—N/a		EL	220	30
Noya Bar Am; Shahar Tibi	Women's 470	2	14	DSQ; ~~(22)~~	3	10	11	4	11	6	13	—N/a		6	80	8

Key

- EL — Eliminated – did not advance into the medal race.

== Shooting ==
Israeli shooter Sergey Richter achieved quota places for the delegation in the men's 10 metre air rifle, by winning the gold medal at the 2019 European Games. This was his third appearance at the Olympics.

Athlete	Event	Qualification		Final	
Athlete	Event	Points	Rank	Points	Rank
Sergey Richter	Men's 10 m air rifle	624.5	27	Did not advance	

== Surfing ==
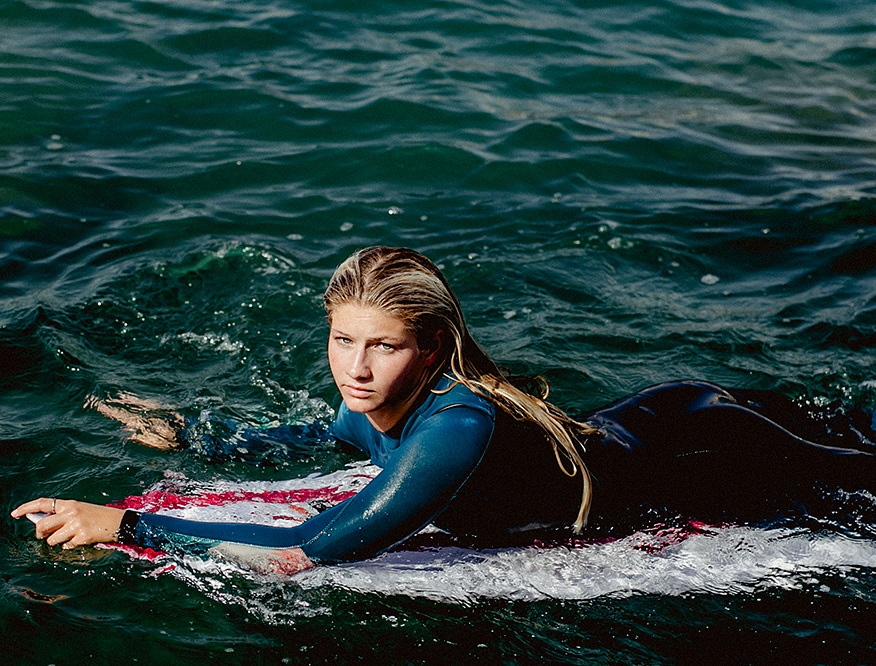
Anat Lelior

Israel sent one surfer to compete in the women's shortboard at the Games. Anat Lelior secured a qualification slot for the nation as the highest-ranked surfer from Europe and one of the top 30 surfers in the overall open division at the 2019 ISA World Surfing Games in Miyazaki, Japan.

Athlete	Event	Round 1		Round 2		Round 3	Quarterfinal	Semifinal	Final / BM	
Athlete	Event	Score	Rank	Score	Rank	Opposition Result	Opposition Result	Opposition Result	Opposition Result	Rank
Anat Lelior	Women's shortboard	7.77	4 Q	8.93	4	Did not advance				17

== Swimming ==
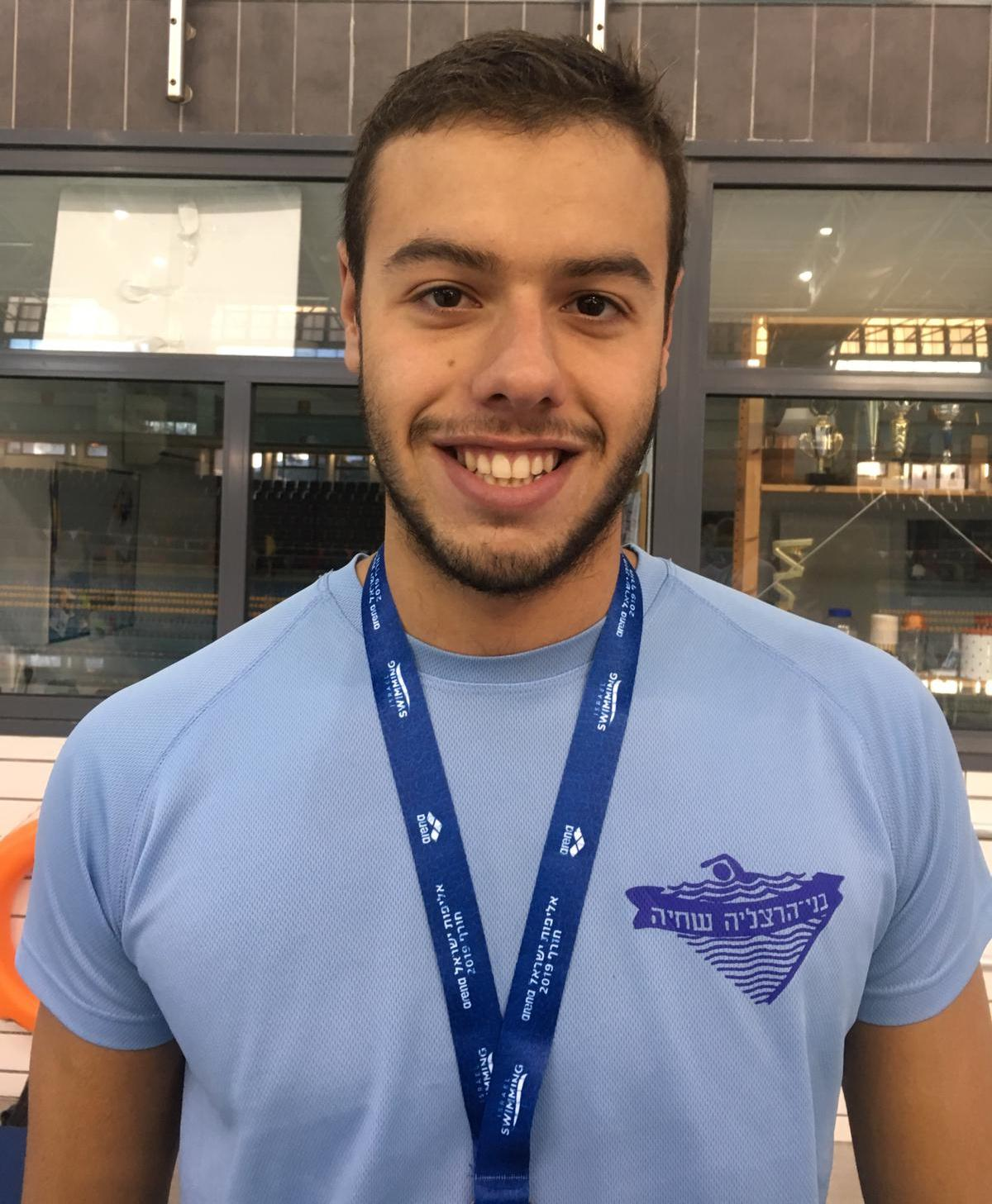
Matan Roditi

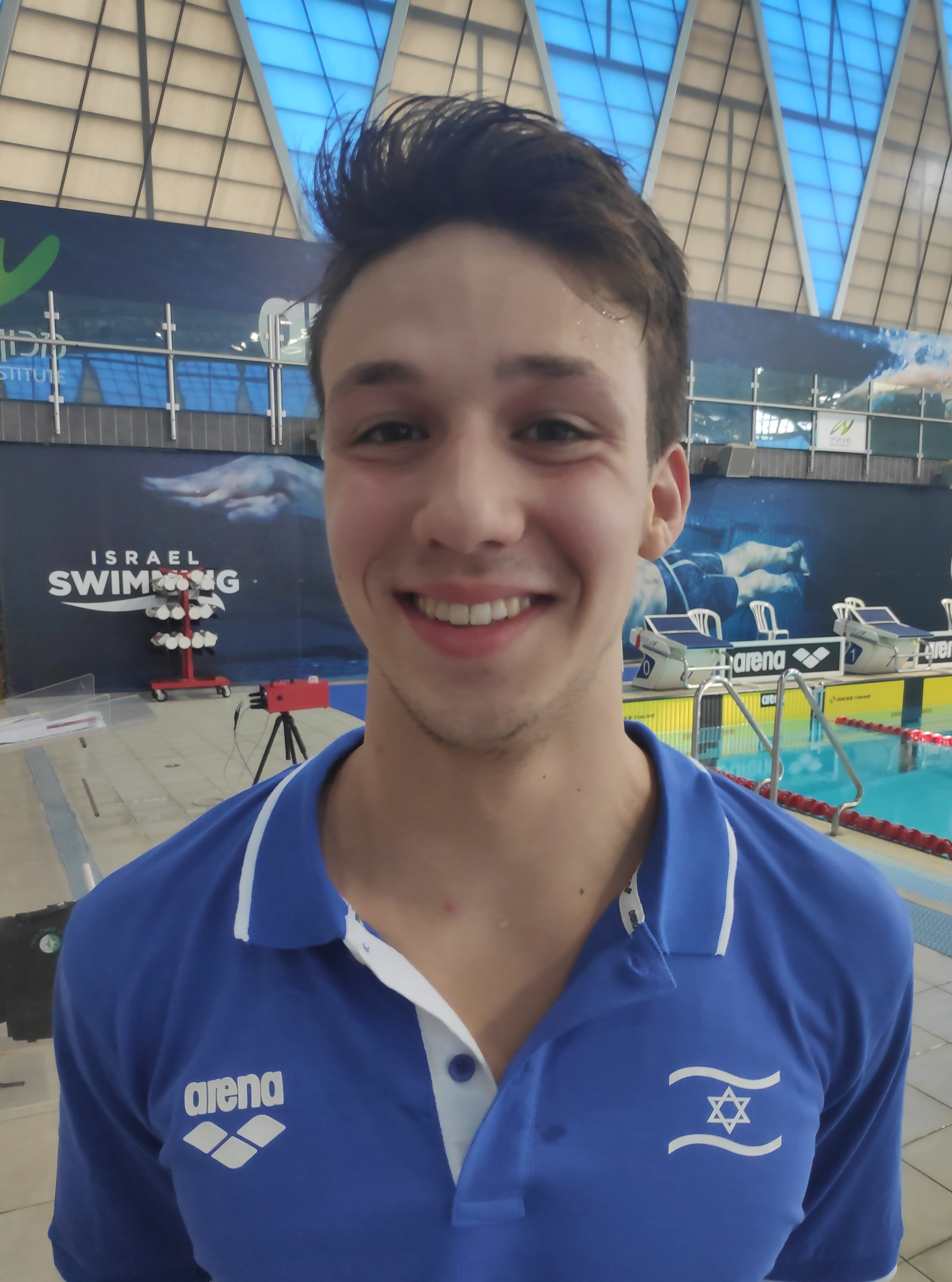
Gal Cohen Groumi

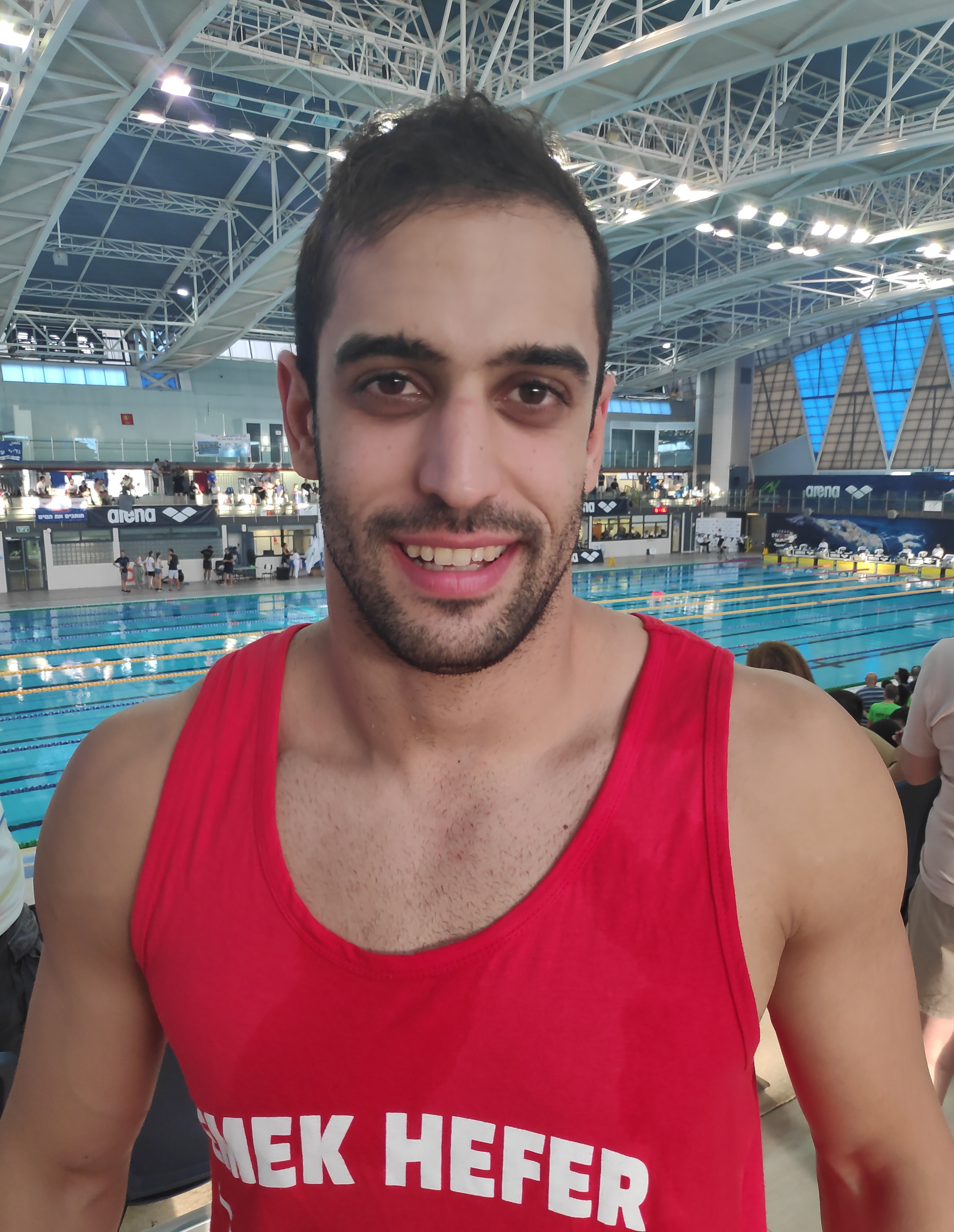
Itay Goldfaden

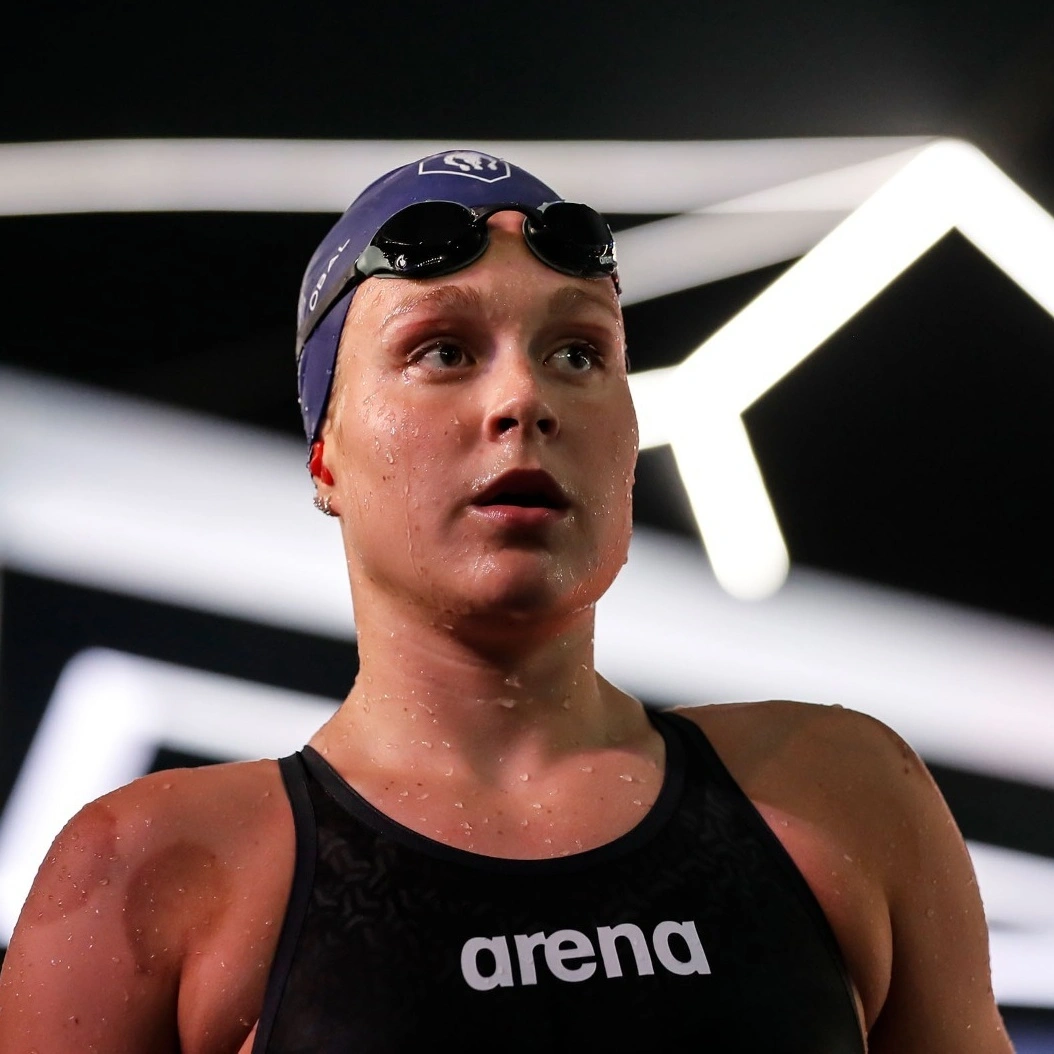
Anastasia Gorbenko

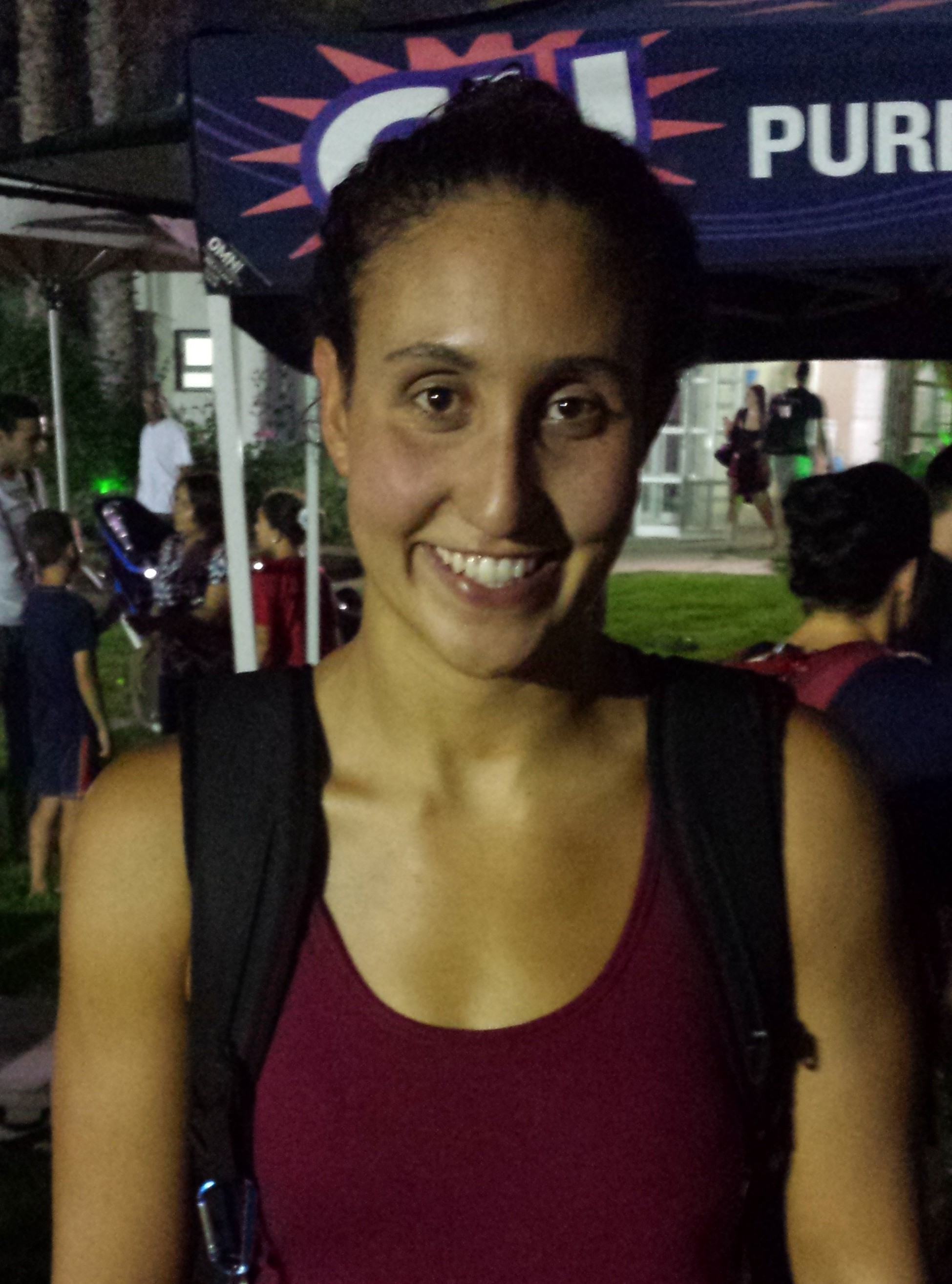
Andrea Murez

Qualification for Israeli swimmers in the individual swimming events in Tokyo is accomplished by achieving the qualifying standards in the events (up to a maximum of 2 swimmers in each event at the Olympic Qualifying Time (OQT), and potentially 1 at the Olympic Selection Time (OST)): All Israeli swimmers must attain the FINA Olympic A-cut at one of the selection meets approved by the Israeli Swimming Association (ISA), or one percent faster at any other competition.

Israel can also enter a team for relay events with a top-12 finish at the 2019 FINA World Championships, provided that at least two swimmers in each relay event are qualified for any of the individual events.

Matan Roditi became the first Israeli swimmer to compete in the open water marathon at the Games after finishing fourth in the 10 km at the 2021 FINA Olympic Marathon Swim Qualifier in Setubal, Portugal.

Men

Athlete	Event	Heat		Semifinal		Final	
Athlete	Event	Time	Rank	Time	Rank	Time	Rank
Meiron Cheruti	50 m freestyle	22.01	17	Did not advance			
Meiron Cheruti	100 m freestyle	49.26	29	Did not advance			
Tomer Frankel	100 m butterfly	51.99	21	Did not advance			
Gal Cohen Groumi	100 m butterfly	DNS		Did not advance			
Gal Cohen Groumi	200 m individual medley	1:59.44	=30	Did not advance			
Michael Laitarovsky	100 m backstroke	55.34	36	Did not advance			
Denis Loktev	200 m freestyle	1:47.68	27	Did not advance			
Ron Polonsky	200 m breaststroke	2:12.71	27	Did not advance			
Ron Polonsky	200 m individual medley	1:58.95	=26	Did not advance			
Ron Polonsky	400 m individual medley	4:21.50	27	—N/a		Did not advance	
Matan Roditi	10 km open water	—N/a				1:49:24.9	4
Yakov Toumarkin	100 m backstroke	54.81	31	Did not advance			
Yakov Toumarkin	200 m backstroke	1:59.65	28	Did not advance			
Tomer Frankel; Gal Cohen Groumi; Denis Loktev; Daniel Namir	4 × 200 m freestyle relay	7:08.65 NR	10	—N/a		Did not advance	

Women

Athlete	Event	Heat		Semifinal		Final	
Athlete	Event	Time	Rank	Time	Rank	Time	Rank
Aviv Barzelay	200 m backstroke	2:11.13	15 Q	2:12.93	15	Did not advance	
Anastasia Gorbenko	100 m backstroke	59.90	12 Q	59.30	8 Q NR	59.53	8
Anastasia Gorbenko	100 m breaststroke	DNS		Did not advance			
Anastasia Gorbenko	100 m butterfly	58.23	18	Did not advance			
Anastasia Gorbenko	200 m breaststroke	2:28.41	28	Did not advance			
Anastasia Gorbenko	200 m individual medley	2:10.21	7 Q	2:10.70	10	Did not advance	
Andrea Murez	50 m freestyle	25.48	30	Did not advance			
Andrea Murez	100 m freestyle	54.06 NR	22	Did not advance			
Andrea Murez	200 m freestyle	1:58.97	19	Did not advance			

Mixed

Athlete	Event	Heat		Final	
Athlete	Event	Time	Rank	Time	Rank
Itay Goldfaden; Gal Cohen Groumi; Anastasia Gorbenko; Andrea Murez	4 × 100 m medley relay	3:43.94 NR	8 Q	3:44.77	8

== Taekwondo ==
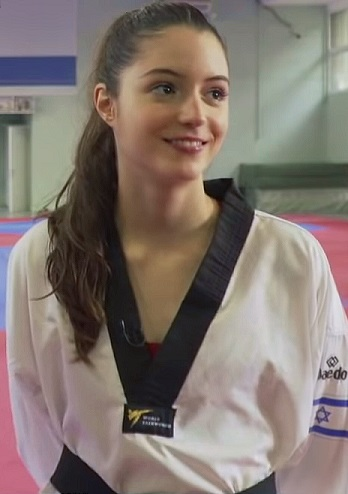
Avishag Semberg

Israel entered one athlete into the taekwondo competition at the Games. Avishag Semberg secured a spot in the women's flyweight category (49 kg) with a top-two finish at the 2021 European Qualification Tournament in Sofia, Bulgaria. The 19-year-old won the bronze medal.

Athlete	Event	Qualification	Round of 16	Quarterfinals	Semifinals	Repechage	Final / BM	
Athlete	Event	Opposition Result	Opposition Result	Opposition Result	Opposition Result	Opposition Result	Opposition Result	Rank
Avishag Semberg	Women's −49 kg	Stambaugh (PUR); W 22–2 PTG	Wongpattanakit (THA); L 5–29 PTG	Did not advance		Trương (VIE); W 22–1 PTG	Yıldırım (TUR); W 27–22	3rd place, bronze medalist(s)

== Triathlon ==
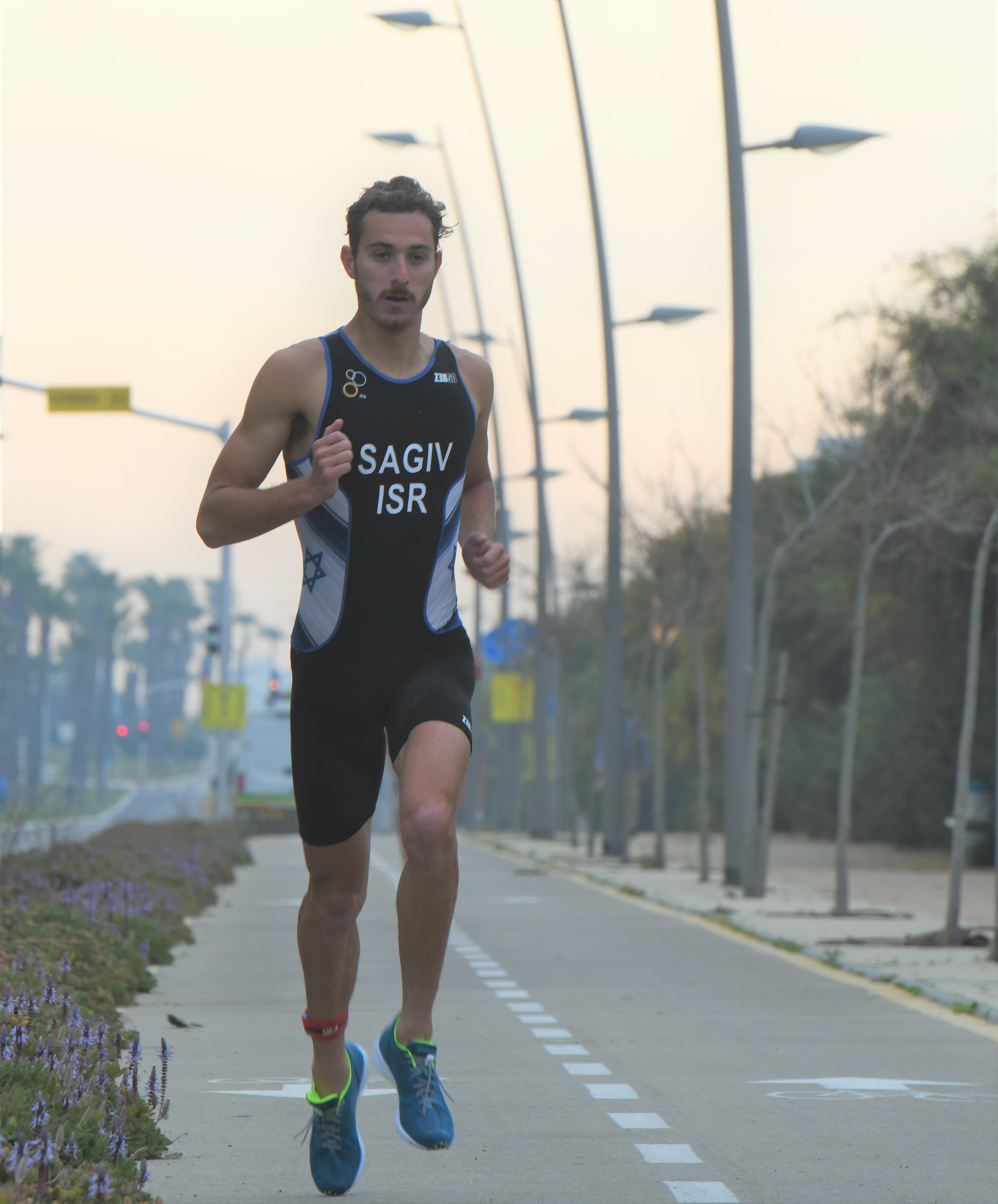
Shachar Sagiv

Israel entered two triathletes to compete at the Games. Brothers Ran and Shachar Sagiv were selected among the top 26 triathletes competing in the men's event based on the ITU World Rankings. The Olympic Committee of Israel confirmed the participation of the two.

Athlete	Event	Time						Rank
Athlete	Event	Swim (1.5 km)	Trans 1	Bike (40 km)	Trans 2	Run (10 km)	Total	Rank
Ran Sagiv	Men's	18:24	0:42	57:50	0:33	31:35	1:49:04	35
Shachar Sagiv	Men's	18:12	0:39	56:14	0:28	31:37	1:47:10	20

== Weightlifting ==
Israel entered one weightlifter into the Olympic competition. David Litvinov received the slot left open by Brazilian Fernando Reis after he failed the pre-competition drug test.

Athlete	Event	Snatch		Clean & Jerk		Total	Rank
Athlete	Event	Result	Rank	Result	Rank	Total	Rank
David Litvinov	Men's +109 kg	176	10	205	11	381	11

== See also ==
- Israel at the Olympics
- Israel at the 2020 Summer Paralympics
