= Danielle G. Waldman =

American-Israeli show jumper (born 1985)

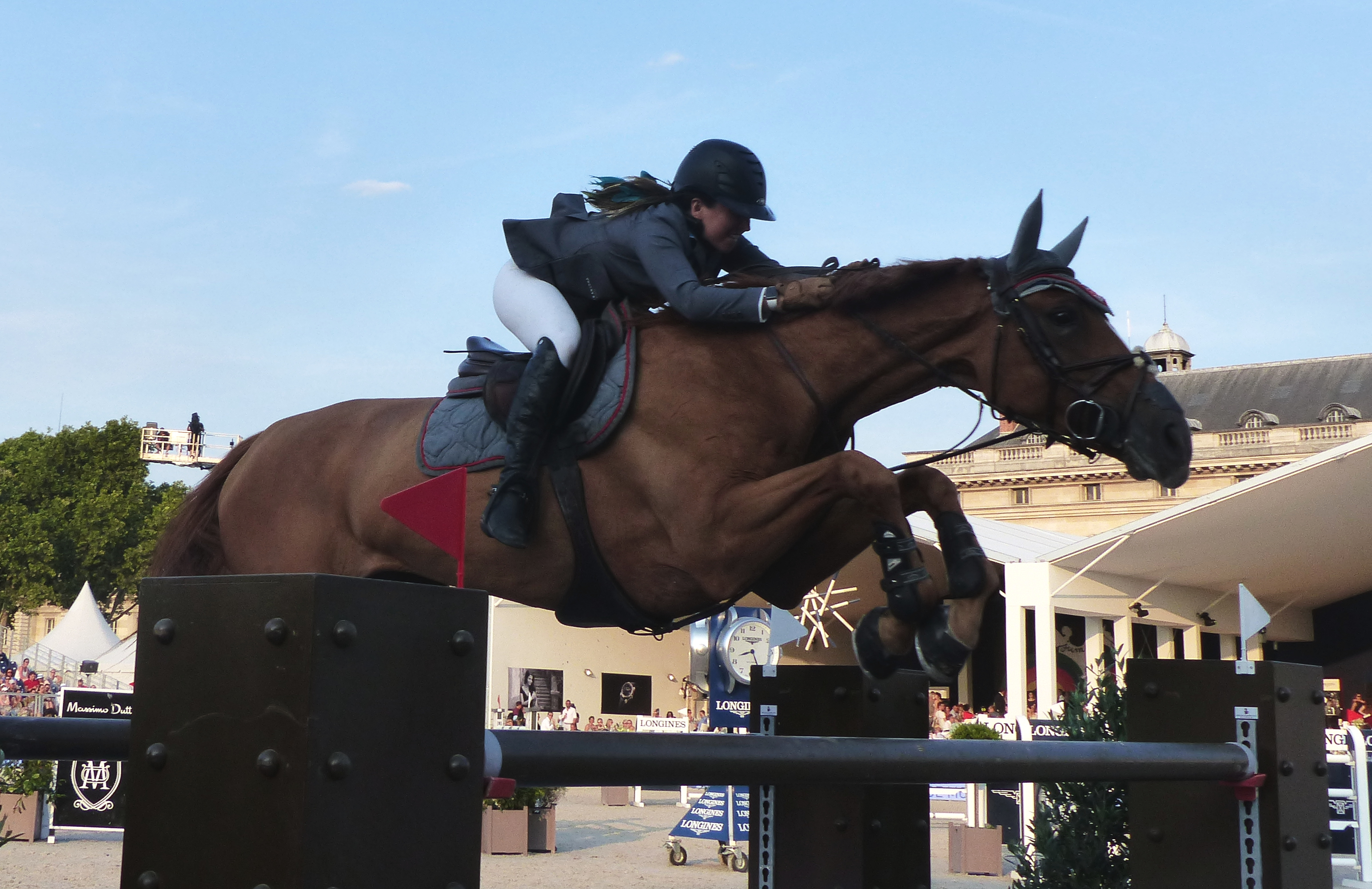
- on Lizziemary at the Paris Eiffel Jumping 2018

Personal information
- Full name: Danielle Goldstein-Waldman
- Nickname: Dani
- Nationality: American, Israeli
- Born: Danielle Lily Goldstein; February 6, 1985 (age 41) New York, New York, U.S.
- Education: Duke University
- Occupation: Show jumper
- Spouse: Alan Waldman

Sport
- Country: Israel
- Sport: Equestrian
- Turned pro: 2012

Danielle "Dani" Goldstein-Waldman (born February 6, 1985) is an American-Israeli show jumper. In July 2019 Goldstein, as part of Israel's four-rider squad, qualified to represent Israel at the 2020 Summer Olympics in Tokyo.

== Early and personal life ==
Danielle Goldstein is a native New Yorker who grew up on the Upper East Side in Manhattan in New York City. Her parents were professional squash players, with her father Stuart ranked number one in the world and her mother nationally ranked in squash, and her father now works in real estate. She is Jewish, and felt drawn to Israel after traveling there on a Bat Mitzvah trip, at the age of 12.

She attended Duke University, where Goldstein earned a BA in global economies and development, and played competitive tennis. She lived in Sydney, Australia, for six months studying urban planning.

Goldstein wears up to 1,000 special colorful hair extension feathers in her hair, that she makes herself to match her hair color, which she changes every four months. It takes more than six hours to put them all in. She also has a unique riding clothing style, in that she wears midriff-bearing sports bras and yoga pants instead of the traditional jodhpurs. Asked about her choices in wearing feathers and yoga pants, she said:

"For me, the feathers and the clothing choices I make, I make them for very personal reasons. I make them because I think the feathers are beautiful; I think that they’re fun, and I think why not? I wear yoga clothes not because I want to make some crazy statement, but because I think I look better in them; I feel better in them; I feel more comfortable. When I look in the mirror, I feel better about myself wearing that clothing than when I wear regular breeches."

Her husband Alan Waldman, whom Goldstein married in June 2019, is a horse breeder, dealer, and trainer. Goldstein now lives and rides in the Netherlands mostly full-time, where she lives and set up an operation in Putten, Netherlands, but comes to Wellington, Florida, where her family owns and operates Starwyn Farms, during the winter season. She also maintains a part-time residence in Tel Aviv, Israel.

She received her Israeli citizenship in 2009.

== Riding career ==
Goldstein began riding at age eight, and competed in her first grand prix at 16 years of age, winning individual and team gold medals in the North American Young Rider Championships that year. She never represented the United States on a senior team because she always intended to do that for Israel.

In 2010, Goldstein acquired Israeli citizenship while she was living there, and has been competing for Israel ever since. She turned professional in 2012.

In 2013, she represented Israel in the ECCO FEI European Show Jumping Championships, in Herning, Denmark, having qualified by finishing 8th in June 2013 in the Outdoor Gelderland/Arnhem Grand Prix 3* in Holland. That year Goldstein also served as the chef d’equipe (team captain) for the gold medal-winning Israeli jumping team in the 2013 Maccabiah Games on Kibbutz Yagur in northern Israel on the slopes of Mount Carmel, outside of Haifa.

In July 2017 Goldstein won the Cascais-Estoril, Portugal Longines Global Champions Tour (LGCT) #9 Grand Prix. She finished 9th at the European Championships in Gothenburg, Sweden.

In February 2019 she was ranked # 43 in the world on the Longines FEI Rankings List. That month she won the $391,000 Palm Beach Equine Clinic Grand Prix CSI5* at the Winter Equestrian Festival in Wellington, Florida.

In May 2019 Goldstein won the Shanghai LGCT Grand Prix, earning over 200,000 euros. She became the first woman to win the competition.

In July 2019 she won the €300,000 LGCT Grand Prix of Berlin CSI 5*.

Also in July 2019 Goldstein, as part of Israel's four-rider squad, qualified to represent Israel at the 2020 Summer Olympics in Tokyo, defeating Poland at an Olympic qualifier in Moscow.
