= Teddy Vlock =

Israeli-American equestrian

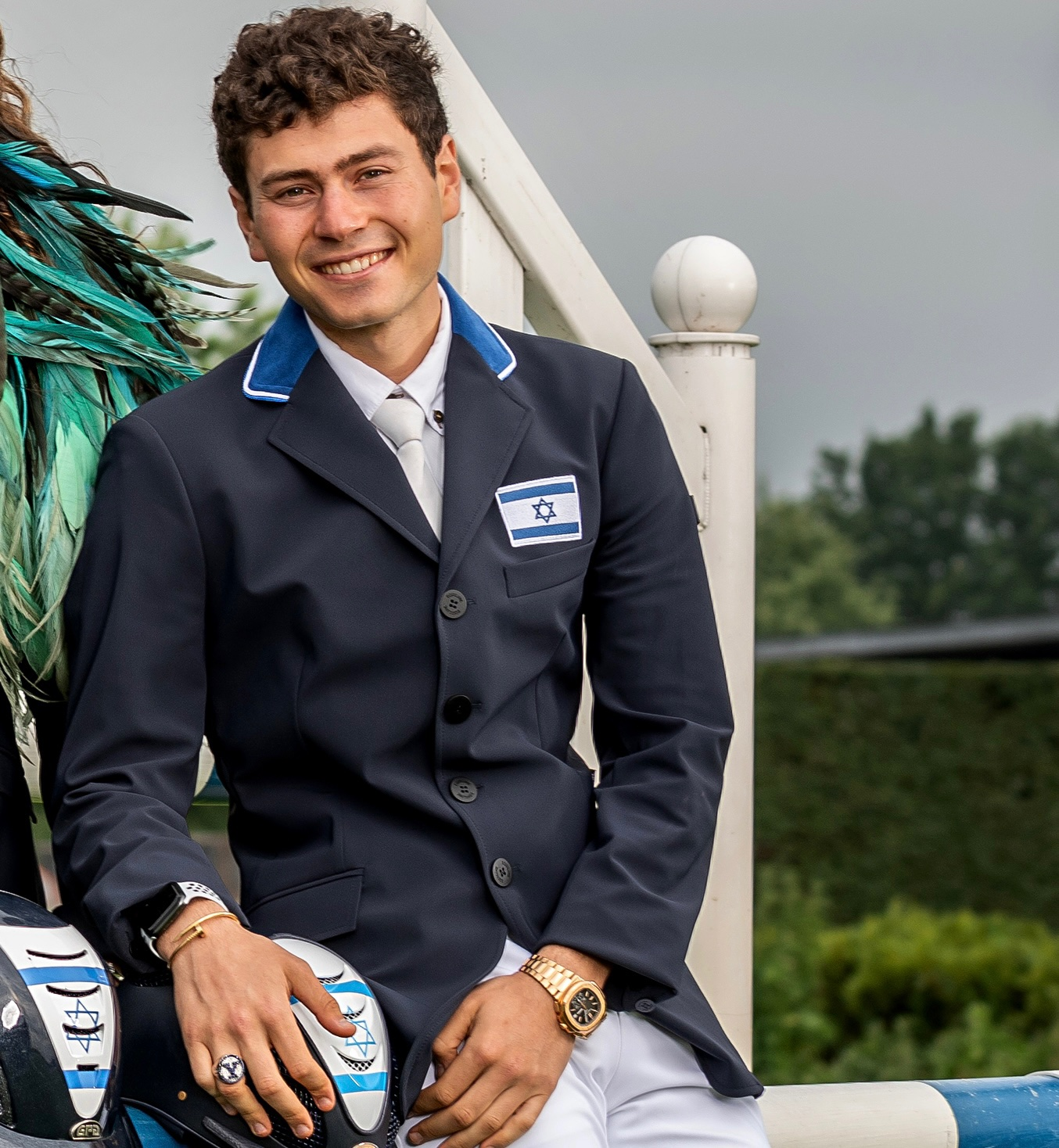

Personal information
- Native name: טדי ולוק
- Full name: Theodore Samuel Pritzker Vlock
- Nationality: American & Israeli
- Citizenship: United States, Israel
- Born: 14 January 1998 (age 28) New Haven, CT United States
- Education: Yale University
- Occupation: Real Estate Developer
- Height: 5 ft 8 in (173 cm)
- Website: www.trdevelop.com

Sport
- Sport: Show jumping

Teddy Vlock (Hebrew: טדי ולוק; born 14 January 1998) is former professional equestrian representing Israel and the United States of America.

== 2020 Tokyo Olympics ==
Vlock, was one of four riders representing Israel in its Olympic equestrian debut, competing as part of the jumping team and as a jumping individual. He finished 42nd of 73 competitors in the Individual Jumping Competition with his horse Amsterdam 27, an 11-year-old Holsteiner gelding.

== Personal life ==
Vlock graduated from Hopkins School in New Haven in 2016. After spending a year competing at the international level of showjumping, he studied at Yale University, where he graduated with a Bachelors of Science of psychology.

While competing at the Winter Equestrian Festival, in Wellington FL, he co-founded T&R Development, a real estate firm with holdings of more than $100 million. In addition to their primary focus of single-family development, T&R operates a property management company, a multi-family portfolio, and consults on equestrian developments.

Vlock is the son of the business woman Karen Pritzker.

Vlock has been riding horses since approximately 2012. He trains with Irish international show jumper Darragh Kenny. As of July 2022, Vlock has not competed in the sport of showjumping since the Tokyo Olympic Games in August 2021.
