= Jake Fishman =

American-Israeli baseball player (born 1995)

Toros de Tijuana – No. 17
- Pitcher
- Born: February 8, 1995 (age 31); Newton, Massachusetts, U.S.
- Bats: Left Throws: Left

MLB debut
- July 31, 2022, for the Miami Marlins

MLB statistics (through 2022 season)
- Win–loss record: 0–0
- Earned run average: 4.09
- Strikeouts: 6
- Stats at Baseball Reference

Teams
- Miami Marlins (2022)

Jake Layton Fishman (Hebrew: ג'ייק פישמן; born February 8, 1995) is an American-Israeli professional baseball pitcher for the Toros de Tijuana of the Mexican League. He is also the co-founder and chief executive officer of PitchLab AI, a mobile application that analyzes baseball pitching metrics using an iPhone camera. He has previously played in Major League Baseball (MLB) for the Miami Marlins. Fishman was selected in the 30th round of the 2016 MLB draft by the Toronto Blue Jays.

Fishman was named to the roster for Team Israel at the 2026 World Baseball Classic. He was previously named to the roster for Team Israel at the 2017 World Baseball Classic, and played for the team at the 2023 World Baseball Classic. In 2019 he obtained Israeli citizenship, and pitched for Team Israel in baseball at the 2020 Summer Olympics in Tokyo, in the summer of 2021. He made his MLB debut with the Miami Marlins in, 2022. He elected to become a free agent in November 2022, and signed a minor league deal with the Oakland Athletics in December 2022.

In high school, in 2013 he was named to the Hockomock League All-Star First Team, and to the Massachusetts All-Star Team. In college, in 2016 with the Union Dutchmen, Fishman led all of college baseball with an 0.41 ERA. He was named the Liberty League's Pitcher of the Year, Player of the Year, All-Liberty League First Team both as a pitcher and as a utility player, and a D3baseball.com All-American.

== Early and personal life ==
Fishman was born in Newton, Massachusetts, to Hutch Fishman and Cindy Layton, and is Jewish. He attended Hebrew school and had his bar mitzvah at Congregation Klal Yisrael in Sharon, Massachusetts, where he now lives. As a minor leaguer, to supplement his income during the off-season Fishman gives pitching lessons or works as a strength trainer at a gym.

== High school ==
Fishman attended Sharon High School in Massachusetts, where he was an outfielder and pitcher. He was captain of his high school baseball team during both his junior and senior years. The now-6'-3" pitcher said he was only 5' 7" until he had a 7-inch growth spurt in his junior year. In his senior year he was named to the Hockomock League All-Star First Team, was runner-up to be the Hockomock League MVP, and was named to the Massachusetts All-Star Team. He graduated in 2013.

== College ==
Undrafted out of high school, Fishman didn't receive an NCAA Division I offer. Fishman then attended NCAA Division III Union College for three years.

In his freshman season, he pitched to a 7–0 win–loss record with a 2.29 earned run average (ERA) and 49 strikeouts in 63 innings pitched. Fishman was named Division III Upstate Baseball Pitcher of the Week after pitching a no-hitter in his second college start on March 29, 2014. Fishman also played first base and designated hitter and batted for Union, hitting .400 with 24 runs batted in (RBI) and 12 stolen bases. In the off-season, he played for the Brockton Rox of the Futures Collegiate Baseball League.

In 2015, Fishman went 4–2 with a 1.48 ERA and 43 strikeouts in 42 2/3 innings. At the plate, he hit .477 with 23 RBIs and 10 stolen bases. He was named to the NCAA 2015 Academic All-District 3 Baseball Team as a designated hitter, with a 3.32 GPA and a major in Managerial Economics. He was also named a 2015 Jewish Sports Review College Baseball All-American with first baseman Simon Rosenbaum and first baseman/outfielder Jeremy Wolf, among others.

In his junior, and final, season with the Dutchmen, in 2016 Fishman led all of college baseball with a 0.41 ERA, and had a 7–0 record with 3 shutouts and a league-leading 85 strikeouts and 11 walks in 66 innings pitched. He had an 0.894 WHIP, 11.6 strikeouts/9 innings, and 7.7 strikeouts/walk. He threw a fastball in the low-90s. He also batted .361/.438/.489 in 133 at bats, with 29 runs, 14 RBIs, and 7 stolen bases in 8 attempts. At the end of the season he was named the Liberty League's Pitcher of the Year, Player of the Year, and All-Liberty League First Team both as a pitcher and as a utility player. Fishman was also selected to the 2016 USA Baseball Golden Spikes Award Midseason Watch List, the only NCAA Division III baseball player named to the list. He was the first Union player to receive D3baseball.com All-American honors at pitcher, and was chosen as an American Baseball Coaches Association (ABCA) Second-Team All-American at utility. In his three years pitching for Union, he went 18-2 with a 1.36 ERA, and as a hitter he batted .410.

After the college season, he pitched one game during the summer for the Wareham Gatemen of the Cape Cod League, and was drafted the following day. Fishman planned to continue attending classes for his Union College degree in the fall of 2016, and to finish his degree requirements. He ultimately finished his degree in managerial economics and digital media in 2019.

When Fishman made his major league debut in 2022, he was the first Union alumnus to appear in a major league game since Bill Cunningham in 1912.

== Professional career ==
=== Toronto Blue Jays ===
==== Minor leagues ====
Fishman was selected in the 30th round of the 2016 Major League Baseball draft by the Toronto Blue Jays. He said: "It was the best feeling in the world." In being selected, he became the first Union College player to be taken in an MLB draft. He signed with the Blue Jays on June 17, for a signing bonus of $50,000 and payment of his senior year tuition, approximately $65,000.

Fishman was assigned to the Rookie-level Gulf Coast League Blue Jays. In 2016 in seven appearances, including one start, he posted a 0–1 record, 4.80 ERA, and 13 strikeouts in 15 innings pitched. He was promoted to the Bluefield Blue Jays of the Rookie Appalachian League on August 20, but did not appear for the team before the end of the season.

In 2017, Fishman pitched one scoreless inning for the Gulf Coast League Blue Jays, pitched in 14 relief appearances for the Vancouver Canadians of the Low–A Northwest League for whom he was 1-0 with 1 save and a 1.17 ERA and 4 walks and 23 strikeouts in 23 innings, and pitched four times in relief for the Lansing Lugnuts of the Single–A Midwest League, for whom he was 0-1 with a 4.05 ERA and zero walks and 15 strikeouts in 6 2/3 innings.

Fishman began the 2018 season pitching for the Dunedin Blue Jays of the High–A Florida State League, for whom he was 2-3 with 8 saves (10th in the league) and a 2.68 ERA, as in 44 games (tied for 2nd in the league) he pitched 57 innings, walked 11, and struck out 56 batters, as he had the best WHIP on the team (1.000) and held batters to a 50.9% ground ball rate. He pitched in one game for the Buffalo Bisons of the Triple–A International League, pitching 1 1/3 perfect innings with one strikeout. Lefties batted .197/.250/.250 against him, in 76 at bats. Blue Jays pitching coordinator Jeff Ware described Fishman as "the kind of pitcher that gives lefties nightmares at the dish."

In 2019, Fishman pitched for the New Hampshire Fisher Cats of the Double–A Eastern League. He was 1-1 with 4 saves and a 3.45 ERA in 42 relief appearances (tops on the team), as he pitched 62 2/3 innings with 74 strikeouts (averaging 10.6 strikeouts per 9 innings), and induced ground balls 50.9% of the time. He held lefties to a .223/.281/.258 slash line and a .540 OPS, and his fastball was top-10 in horizontal movement among upper-level lefties.

Fishman did not play in a game in 2020 due to the cancellation of the minor league season because of the COVID-19 pandemic.

=== Miami Marlins ===
On December 10, 2020, Fishman was selected by the Miami Marlins in the first round, with the 12th pick, of the minor league phase of the Rule 5 draft. Pitching for the Triple-A East Jacksonville Jumbo Shrimp in the 2021 season, he was 5-1 with one save and a 3.67 ERA, pitching 45 1/3 innings over 34 games (2 starts). Lefties hit .200/.234/.267 against him, in 90 at bats.

Fishman began the 2022 season back with Jacksonville, pitching as a reliever. On July 31, the Marlins selected his contract and promoted him to the major leagues for the first time. At the time, in Triple-A Fishman had a 1.87 ERA with 43 strikeouts and 16 walks in 43 1/3 innings. He had an 0.992 WHIP (10th-best in the International League), 5.6 hits per 9 innings (7th), a 54.3% ground-ball rate, 24.4% strikeout rate, and 9.1% walk rate, had held lefties to a batting slash line of .163/.240/.233 in 86 at bats, and had pitched at least two innings in 14 of his 25 relief appearances.

Fishman made his MLB debut with the Marlins that same day. In 11 innings with the Marlins over seven games, he recorded a 4.09 ERA and a WHIP of 1.18. He threw a sinker 60% of the time (with an average drop of 38 inches; the MLB average was 23 inches), and a slider 40% of the time (with an average drop of 48 inches; the MLB average was 37 inches). Fishman was designated for assignment by Miami on August 1 after Jesús Luzardo was activated off of the injured list. He cleared waivers and was sent outright to Triple-A on August 4. After six appearances in Triple–A, in which he logged a 2.79 ERA in 9 2/3 innings, Fishman was selected back to the major league roster on August 27. He tossed a scoreless inning against the Tampa Bay Rays before he was designated for assignment again on August 31, when Trevor Rogers was activated from the injured list. He was again sent outright to Triple–A Jacksonville on September 3.

In his minor league career through 2022, he was 13-8 with 15 saves and a 2.97 ERA in 279 innings in which he struck out 288 batters, with a WHIP of 1.12. He walked 2.4 batters and struck out 9.3 batters per 9 innings. On November 2, he was removed from the 40-man roster and sent outright to Triple-A Jacksonville. He elected to become a free agent the same day.

=== Oakland Athletics ===
On December 20, 2022, Fishman signed a minor league contract with an invite to spring training with the Oakland Athletics. He was assigned to the Triple–A Las Vegas Aviators to begin the 2023 season, but surrendered 8 runs on 9 hits and 1 walk with 4 strikeouts in 3.0 innings of work. After beginning a rehab stint with the rookie–level Arizona Complex League Athletics, in which he was 0-1 with a 2.25 ERA and struck out 7 batters in 4 innings, Fishman was released by Oakland on July 1, 2023.

=== Long Island Ducks ===
On July 25, 2023, Fishman signed with the Long Island Ducks of the Atlantic League of Professional Baseball. In 2023 with the team, he was 2–0 with a 4.82 ERA, as he gave up 12 hits and four walks and struck out 19 batters in 18 2/3 innings.

On August 8, 2024, Fishman re–signed with the Ducks. In 14 appearances for the club, he posted a 2-0 record and 2.25 ERA with 20 strikeouts over 12 innings of work. Fishman became a free agent following the season.

=== Toros de Tijuana ===
On April 19, 2025, Fishman signed with the Toros de Tijuana of the Mexican League.

== Team Israel ==
=== 2017; World Baseball Classic ===
Fishman was on the roster to play for Team Israel at the 2017 World Baseball Classic in South Korea. Team Israel coach Jerry Weinstein had been Fishman's coach when he played for the Wareham Gatemen of the Cape Cod League in 2016.

=== 2021; the Olympics ===
In November 2019, he obtained Israeli citizenship so that he could play for Team Israel in baseball at the 2020 Summer Olympics in Tokyo.

Fishman pitched for Team Israel at the 2020 Olympics in the summer of 2021, as Israel was one of six teams to qualify for the Olympic Games. He pitched in a win against Team Mexico, and in losses to Team South Korea and the bronze-medal-winning Team Dominican Republic. He said, "They were the most intense games I’ve ever been a part of."

=== 2023; World Baseball Classic and European Baseball Championship ===
Fishman played for Team Israel again in the 2023 World Baseball Classic. He played for Team Israel manager Ian Kinsler, and alongside two-time All Star outfielder Joc Pederson, starting pitcher Dean Kremer, and others.

Fishman pitched for Team Israel in the 2023 European Baseball Championship in September 2023 in the Czech Republic, and was 1-0 with one save and a 0.00 ERA in three games.

== PitchLab AI ==
Fishman is co-founder and CEO of PitchLab AI, a mobile application that uses computer vision and artificial intelligence to analyze baseball pitching metrics from video captured on an iPhone. The app was developed with technical input from Dr. Brian Martin and draws on Fishman’s experience as a professional baseball player.

== See also ==
- List of select Jewish baseball players
