= Jeremy Wolf =

American-Israeli baseball player

Israel National Baseball Team
- Outfielder/first baseman
- Born: November 2, 1993 (age 32); Scottsdale, Arizona
- Bats: Left Throws: Right
- Stats at Baseball Reference

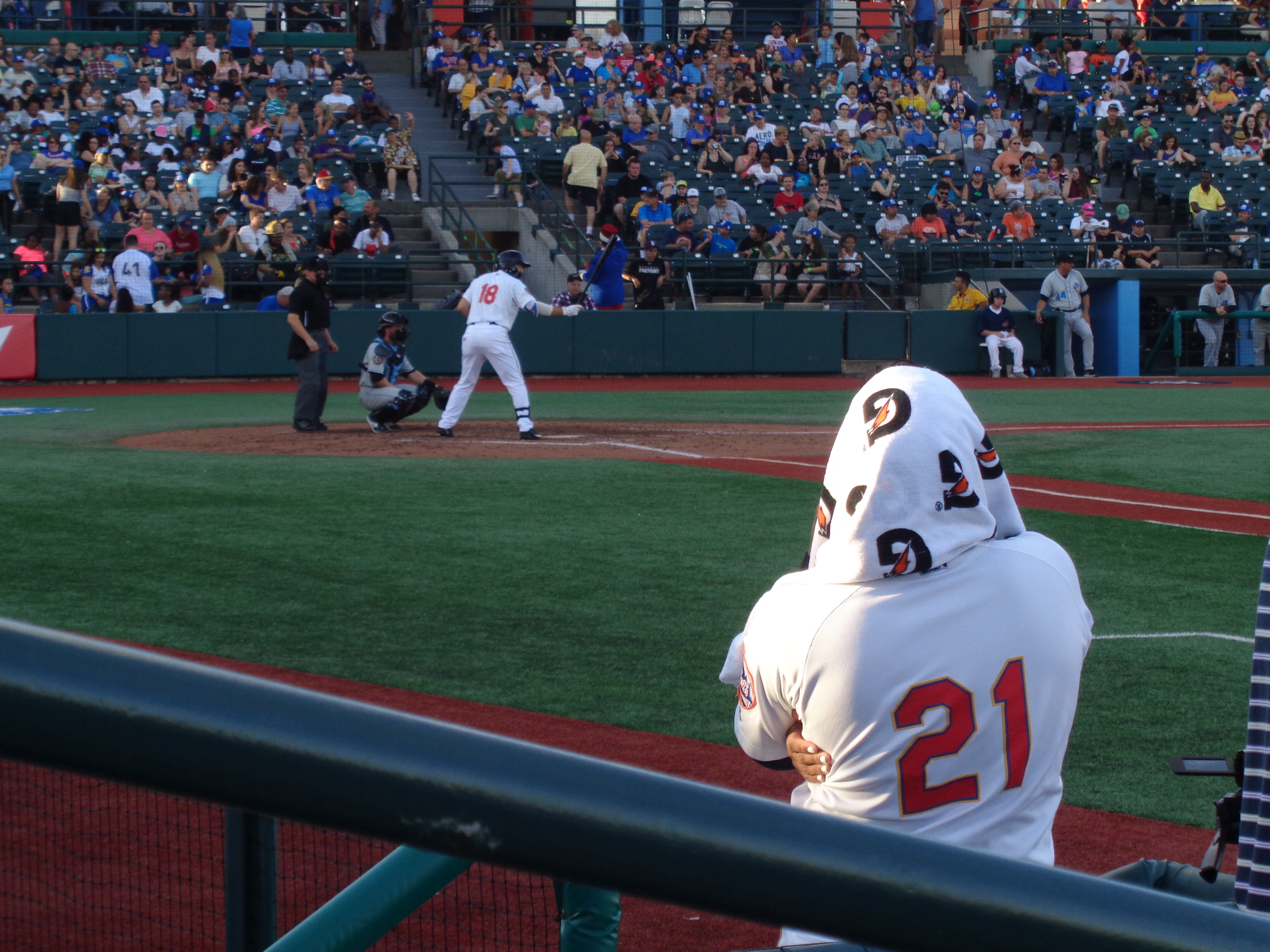
Jeremy Wolf at bat during the fourth inning of the Cyclones game against the Renegades on June 24, 2017.

Jeremy Daniel Wolf (Hebrew: ג'רמי וולף; born November 2, 1993) is an American-Israeli baseball player on the Israel National Baseball Team.

== High school and college ==
Wolf attended Chaparral High School, where he played on the Firebirds alongside among others future major leaguer and fellow outfielder Dylan Cozens, as the team won the Division I Arizona state title.

He attended college at Trinity University in San Antonio, Texas, graduating with a bachelor's degree in Communications in 2016. In 2015 Wolf was named a Jewish Sports Review College Baseball All-American with, among others, first baseman Simon Rosenbaum and designated hitter/pitcher Jake Fishman.

With Wolf playing in the outfield, the team won the 2016 NCAA Division III Baseball Championship. In 2016, he hit .408/.508/.741 with 60 runs, 28 doubles (leading the NCAA, and establishing new Trinity and SCAC single-season records), 149 total bases (third in the nation), 11 home runs, and 70 RBIs (4th in the nation). He was named All-American First Team of both the American Baseball Coaches Association (ABCA) and D3baseball.com, was named the West Region Player of the Year by the ABCA and D3baseball.com, and was named Southern Collegiate Athletic Conference Player of the Year. In his college career Wolf hit a combined .367/.455/.577 with 146 runs, 72 doubles (a Trinity record), and 172 RBIs in 679 at bats over 189 games.

In the summer of 2013 Wolf played outfield for the Casper Cutthroats of the Mountain Collegiate Baseball League. In the summer of 2014 he played for the Petersburg Generals of the Coastal Plain League, a collegiate summer baseball league. He batted .331/.399/.491 with one home run and 33 RBIs in 175 at bats.

In the summer of 2015 he played left field for the Newport Gulls of the New England Collegiate Baseball League, a collegiate summer baseball league. Wolf batted .280/.370/.409 with three home runs and 22 RBIs in 132 at bats.

== Minor leagues ==
Wolf was selected by the New York Mets in the 31st round of the 2016 Major League Baseball draft. He signed on June 15, 2016, for a $5,000 signing bonus.

In 2016, he played primarily first base for the Kingsport Mets of the Rookie-level Appalachian League. Wolf's salary was $1,100 per month. He batted .290/.359/.448 with five home runs and 33 RBIs in 183 at bats.

In 2017, Wolf played primarily left field and right field for the Brooklyn Cyclones of the Class A Short Season New York–Penn League. He batted .241/.308/.313 with no home runs and 10 RBIs in 83 at bats.

After he had surgery to repair a back injury, Wolf was released by the Mets on October 13, 2017.

== Team Israel ==
Wolf is an outfielder on the Israel National Baseball Team.

He played in the Confederation of European Baseball's 2019 European Baseball Championship - B-Pool in early July 2019 in Blagoevgrad, Bulgaria, as it won all of its games and advanced to the playoffs against Team Lithuania in the 2019 Playoff Series at the end of July 2019 for the last qualifying spot for the 2019 European Baseball Championship. Wolf then played for Team Israel at the 2019 European Baseball Championship. He also played for the team at the Africa/Europe 2020 Olympic Qualification tournament in Italy in September 2019, which Israel won to qualify to play baseball at the 2020 Summer Olympics in Tokyo.

== Personal ==
Wolf was born in Scottsdale, Arizona, and is Jewish. As a young adult, he visited Israel on Birthright.

In October 2018, Wolf made aliyah and became an Israeli citizen, thus becoming a dual American-Israeli citizen.

In October 2019, Wolf moved to Tel Aviv, Israel, in order to coach baseball and train for the Olympics.

Currently he coaches baseball part-time and serves as executive director of More Than Baseball, a nonprofit organization that focuses primarily on serving minor-league athletes.

Jeremy married Sona Shahbazian, current orthopedic surgery trainee, on December 31st, 2023.
