= Simon Rosenbaum (baseball) =

American-Israeli baseball player

- First baseman/Pitcher
- Born: December 28, 1993 (age 32); Los Altos Hills, California
- Bats: Right Throws: Right
- Stats at Baseball Reference

Simon Rosenbaum (Hebrew: סימון רוזנבאום; born December 28, 1993) is an American-Israeli baseball first baseman. He plays for the Israel National Baseball Team. He played for Team Israel at the 2019 European Baseball Championship. He also played for the team at the Africa/Europe 2020 Olympic Qualification tournament in Italy in September 2019, which Israel won to qualify to play baseball at the 2020 Summer Olympics in Tokyo.

== Early and personal life ==
Rosenbaum was born and grew up in Los Altos Hills, California. He has two younger brothers, professional basketball player in the Israeli Basketball Premier League, Daniel Rosenbaum and Adam Rosenbaum. Rosenbaum is Jewish, and attended Jewish day school through 8th grade. He learned to read Torah for his bar mitzvah. His father Amir was born in Israel, and immigrated to the United States as a child. His paternal grandfather was born in Germany.

He attended Los Altos High School ('12), where Rosenbaum played both baseball and basketball. In baseball, he was an All-League selection his junior and senior seasons. He is 6' 6", and 230 pounds (198 cm, 104 kg).

== College ==
Rosenbaum then attended Pomona College, where he played on its NCAA Division III baseball team the Pomona Sagehens as a pitcher and infielder, and double-majored in Mathematics and Economics. He pitched his freshman year, and was 5-1 with a 2.03 ERA and named 2013 All-West Region Rookie of the Year and Third Team, but tore his UCL and needed Tommy John surgery. He switched to playing first base while he was rehabbing. In 2013 he ranked second in the United States among Division III players with a .474 batting average, while leading them in both doubles and on-base percentage. D3Baseball.com and ABCA/Rawlings each named him a Division III First Team All-American, and he was named the West Region Player of the Year.

On March 6, 2014, he was named the NCAA Division III National Hitter of the Week. As a sophomore in May 2014 Rosenbaum was named to the NCAA Division III Capital One District 8 Academic All-District Team. In 2014 he was named an All American and SCIAC Player of the Year, as well as a member of the SCIAC Baseball All-Academic Team and West Region Player of the Year. In the summer of 2014 he played for the Wenatchee AppleSox of the West Coast League. In January 2015 he was named a Preseason First Team All-American by D3baseball.com. He was named 2015 All-SCIAC First Team, and named a 2015 Jewish Sports Review College Baseball All-American with, among others, first baseman/outfielder Jeremy Wolf and designated hitter/pitcher Jake Fishman. For his senior thesis, he evaluated the impact of the Major League Baseball collective bargaining agreement on the first-year player draft. For his college career he batted .376 with 23 home runs, 64 doubles, and over 160 RBIs, while pitching to a 7-3 record.

In 2015 Rosenbaum played for the Vermont Mountaineers of the New England Collegiate Baseball League. He batted .245/.288/.327 with no home runs and six RBIs in 49 at bats.

== Brussels Kangaroos ==
After college, Rosenbaum was a player/coach for the Brussels Kangaroos in Belgium.

== Team Israel ==
Rosenbaum plays for the Israel National Baseball Team.

In the summer of 2014 Rosenbaum played for Israel at the 2014 European Pool C Championships qualifying round in Ljubljana, Slovenia, at which Israel won the tournament. He was named the tournament MVP, as he was 9-for-17 with four home runs and 10 RBIs.

Rosenbaum played for Team Israel in the B Pool in Vienna, Austria, in 2015.

He played for Team Israel at the 2019 European Baseball Championship, and hit the game-tying home run in the 2019 B Pool Championship game against Russia in the bottom of the 8th.

He also played for the team at the Africa/Europe 2020 Olympic Qualification tournament in Italy in September 2019, which Israel won to qualify to play baseball at the 2020 Summer Olympics in Tokyo. He played right field and DH and batted .133/.167/.133 in the tournament.

== Tampa Bay Rays scout and coordinator ==
In 2017 Rosenbaum was an advance scouting intern with the Tampa Bay Rays. In January 2019 he was hired by the Rays as a coordinator for baseball development.

== See also ==
- List of baseball players who underwent Tommy John surgery
