= Cornelia Bargmann =

American neurobiologist

Cori Bargmann
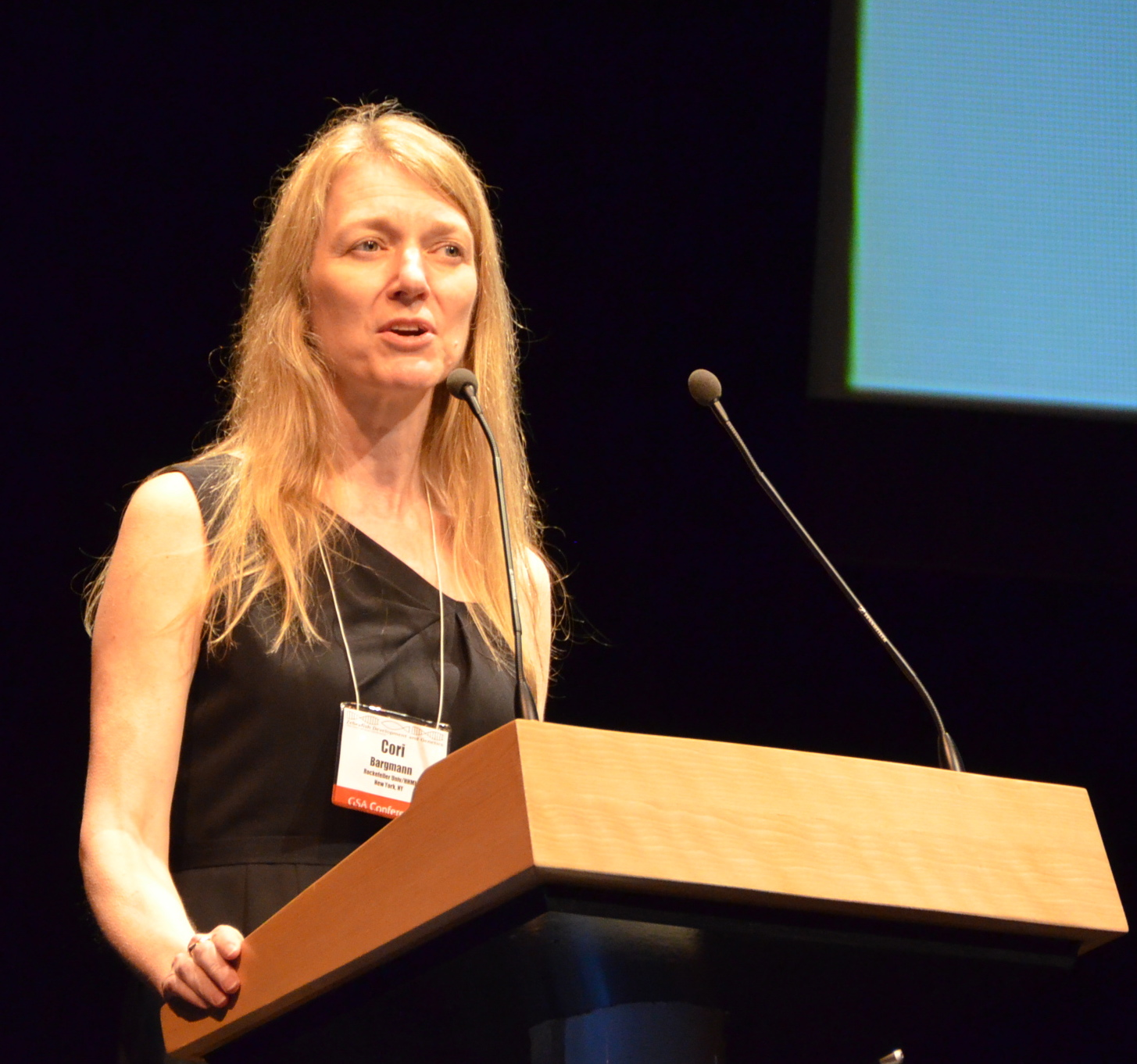
- Born: Cornelia Isabella Bargmann; January 1, 1961 (age 65); Virginia, U.S.
- Education: University of Georgia (BS); Massachusetts Institute of Technology (MS, PhD)
- Known for: Olfaction research
- Spouse: Richard Axel
- Awards: Gruber Prize 2024; Scolnick Prize in Neuroscience 2016; Breakthrough Prize in Life Sciences 2013; Kavli Prize 2012
- Scientific career
- Fields: Biochemistry; Cancer systems biology Neurobiology
- Workplaces: Rockefeller University
- Thesis: Activation of the Neu Oncogene (1987)
- Doctoral advisor: Robert Weinberg
- Other academic advisors: H. Robert Horvitz
- Doctoral students: Steven McCarroll

Cornelia Isabella "Cori" Bargmann (born January 1, 1961) is an American neurobiologist. She is known for her work on the genetic and neural circuit mechanisms of behavior using C. elegans, particularly the mechanisms of olfaction in the worm. She has been elected to the National Academy of Sciences and had been a Howard Hughes Medical Institute investigator at UCSF and then Rockefeller University from 1995 to 2016. She was the Head of Science at the Chan Zuckerberg Initiative from 2016 to 2022. In 2012 she was awarded the $1 million Kavli Prize, and in 2013 the $3 million Breakthrough Prize in Life Sciences.

== Early life and education ==
Bargmann was born in Virginia and grew up in Athens, Georgia. Her parents are European immigrants. She is one of four sisters and the daughter of Rolf Bargmann, a statistician and computer scientist at the University of Georgia. She grew up playing the piano and was exposed to literature and education from a very young age. She described her family as “frighteningly well educated”. She was inspired to study science because her older sister attended medical school. She also says that growing up in the space era fostered her love for science.

She completed her undergraduate studies at the University of Georgia in 1981, with a degree in biochemistry. While at UGA, she grew her lab experience by working in the labs of Wyatt Anderson and Sidney Kushner. She completed graduate school at MIT with a Ph.D. in the department of Biology in 1987 under the supervision of Robert Weinberg. She examined the molecular mechanisms of oncogenesis, and helped identify the role of Ras in bladder cancer. She wrote her thesis on neu, a non-Ras oncogene. Although the relevance of her research was doubted at the time, it later led to significant treatments in breast cancer.

== Career and research ==
Bargmann completed a postdoc with H. Robert Horvitz at MIT, working on molecular biology mechanisms of neuroscience. She began working on chemosensory behavior in C. elegans, and achieved several breakthroughs, demonstrating, among other things, that nematodes have a sense of smell.

Bargmann accepted a faculty position at UCSF in the department of Anatomy in 1995. She was promoted from assistant professor to professor in 1998, and served as vice chair of the department from 1999 to 2000.

She continued her studies of worm behavior and neural control, focusing on olfaction at the molecular level. She looked for genes similar to those found by Richard Axel and Linda Buck to be the basis of smell and taste, and found those genes in the recently sequenced genome of C. elegans. Her work led to discoveries of the mechanisms underlying complex behaviors, such as feeding behaviors. The work has continued to lead to a deeper understanding of the brain, sensory abilities, and neuronal development. Bargmann also identified SYG-1, a "matchmaker" molecule that directs neurons to form connections with each other during development.

In 2004, Bargmann moved to Rockefeller University. She said that the reason for the move is that she wanted more flexibility to focus on research. She served as an Investigator of the Howard Hughes Medical Institute until 2016 before she took the President of CZI. Bargmann's lab uses a relatively simple organism, the nematode C. elegans, and its extremely sensitive sense of smell to study how genes regulate neuronal development, function, and behavior. Her work has been recognized with numerous awards including election to the National Academy of Sciences. She also served on the Life Sciences jury for the Infosys Prize in 2012.

Bargmann's research was funded by the Howard Hughes Medical Institute from 1995 to 2016. She was the co-chair of the BRAIN initiative and the Head of Science for the Chan Zuckerberg Initiative. She won the Breakthrough prize in Life Sciences in 2013.

Bargmann is married to fellow olfactory scientist Richard Axel, a Nobel laureate. Previously, she had been married to Michael J. Finney, who also completed graduate studies at MIT and is now a Director at Sage Science, Inc.

For a vivid portrait of Bargmann as a young scientist working in Weinberg's lab, see Natalie Angier's book Natural Obsessions: The Search for the Oncogene.

== Notable papers ==
- Sengupta, Piali; Chou, James H.; Bargmann, Cornelia I. (1996). "Odorant-selective genes and neurons mediate olfaction in C. elegans". Cell. 84 (6): 899–909. doi:10.1016/S0092-8674(00)81068-4. PMID 8601313.
- de Bono, Mario; Bargmann, Cornelia I. (September 4, 1998). "Natural variation in a neuropeptide Y receptor homolog modifies social behavior and food response in C. Elegans". Cell. 94 (5): 679–689. Bibcode:1998Cell...94..679D. doi:10.1016/S0092-8674(00)81609-8. PMID 9741632. S2CID 14685930.
- Shen, Kang; Bargmann, Cornelia I. (March 7, 2003). "The immunoglobin superfamily protein SYG-1 determines the location of specific synapses in C. Elegans". Cell. 112 (5): 619–630. doi:10.1016/S0092-8674(03)00113-2. PMID 12628183. S2CID 12520113.
- Zhang, Yun; Lu, Hang; Bargmann, Cornelia I. (November 2005). "Pathogenic bacteria induce aversive olfactory learning in Caenorhabditis elegans". Nature. 438 (7065): 179–184. Bibcode:2005Natur.438..179Z. doi:10.1038/nature04216. PMID 16281027. S2CID 4418821.
- Chalasani, Sreekanth H.; Chronis, Nikos; Tsunozaki, Makoto; Gray, Jesse M.; Ramot, Daniel; Goodman, Miriam B.; Bargmann, Cornelia I. (November 2007). "Dissecting a circuit for olfactory behaviour in Caenorhabditis elegans" (PDF). Nature. 450 (7166): 63–70. Bibcode:2007Natur.450...63C. doi:10.1038/nature06541. PMID 17972877. S2CID 4352901.
- Macosko, Evan Z.; Pokala, Navin; Feinberg, Evan H.; Chalasani, Sreekanth H.; Butcher, Rebecca A.; Clardy, Jon; Bargmann, Cornelia I. (April 30, 2009). "A hub-and-spoke circuit drives pheromone attraction and social behaviour in C. elegans". Nature. 458 (7242): 1171–1175. doi:10.1038/nature07886. PMC 2760495. PMID 19349961.
- Chalasani, Sreekanth H.; Kato, Saul; Albrecht, Dirk R.; Nakagawa, Takao; Abbott, L. F.; Bargmann, Cornelia I. (May 2010). "Neuropeptide feedback modifies odor-evoked dynamics in Caenorhabditis elegans olfactory neurons". Nature Neuroscience. 13 (5): 615–621. doi:10.1038/nn.2526. PMC 2937567. PMID 20364145.
- Liu, Qiang; Kidd, Philip B.; Dobosiewicz, May; Bargmann, Cornelia I. (2018). "C. elegans AWA Olfactory Neurons Fire Calcium-Mediated All-or-None Action Potentials". Cell. 175 (1): 57–70.e17. doi:10.1016/j.cell.2018.08.018. PMID 30220455.
- Levy, Sagi; Bargmann, Cornelia I. (2020). "An Adaptive-Threshold Mechanism for Odor Sensation and Animal Navigation". Neuron. 105 (3): 534–548.e13. doi:10.1016/j.neuron.2019.10.034. PMID 31761709.

== Awards ==
- 1990–1995 - Lucille P. Markey Award
- 1992–1995 - Searle Scholar Award
- 1997 - Taskago Prize for olfaction research.
- 1997 - W. Alden Spencer Award for neuroscience research.
- 2000 - Charles Judson Herick Award for comparative neurology.
- 2002 - Fellow of the American Academy of Arts and Sciences.
- 2003 - Member of the National Academy of Sciences
- 2004 - Dargut and Milena Kemali Prize for Basic and Clinical Neuroscience.
- 2009 - Richard Lounsbery Award
- 2010 - Perl-UNC Prize
- 2012 - Kavli Prize in neuroscience
- 2012 - Member of the Norwegian Academy of Science and Letters
- 2012 - Member of the American Philosophical Society
- 2013 - Breakthrough Prize in Life Sciences for the genetics of neural circuits and behavior, and synaptic guidepost molecules
- 2015 - Benjamin Franklin Medal in Life Sciences.
- 2016 - Edward M. Scolnick Prize in Neuroscience.
- 2021 - Salk Medal for Research Excellence.
- 2023 - Wistar Institute Helen Dean King Award
- 2024 - Gruber Neuroscience Prize
