= Los Altos High School (Los Altos, California) =

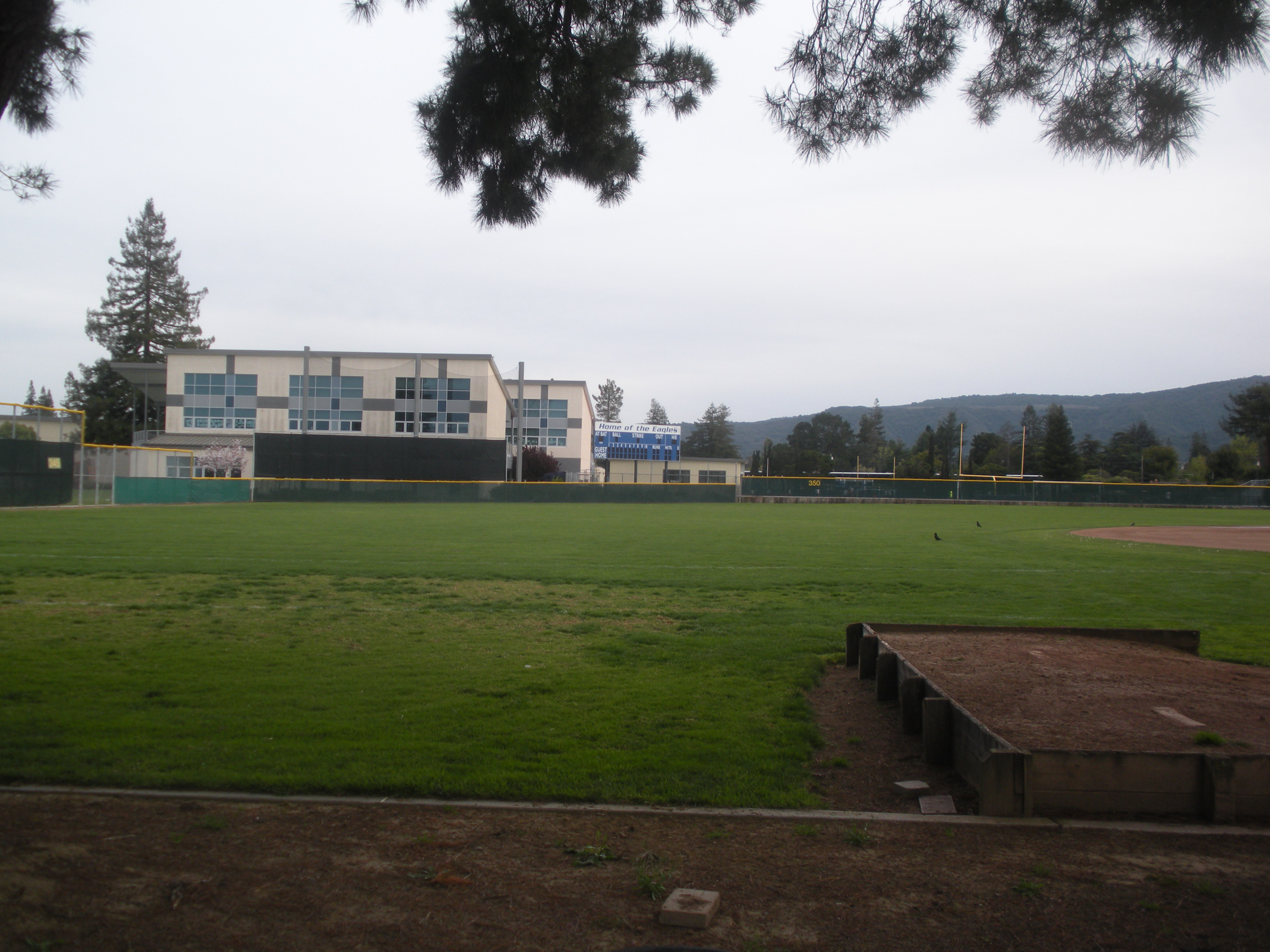
- School campus from the south

Location
- 201 Almond Avenue; Los Altos, Santa Clara County, California 94022; United States; 37.386705°N 122.108831°W

Information
- Type: Public
- Established: 1954; 72 years ago
- School district: MVLA School District
- Superintendent: Nellie Meyer
- Principal: Tracey Runeare
- Grades: 9-12
- Enrollment: 2141 (2023-24)
- Student to teacher ratio: 20:1
- Campus: Suburban Urban
- Colors: Blue, white, and gray
- Athletics conference: Santa Clara Valley Athletic League; CIF Central Coast Section
- Mascot: Eagle
- Team name: Eagles
- National ranking: 437
- Newspaper: The Talon
- Yearbook: Aerie
- Website: lahs.mvla.net

Los Altos High School (LAHS) is a public senior high school located in Los Altos, California, United States, in the heart of Silicon Valley. It was opened in 1954. It is part of the Mountain View–Los Altos Union High School District.

The main feeder schools are Egan Junior High School and Crittenden Middle School. The attendance area includes highly affluent sections of Los Altos, Los Altos Hills and Mountain View, and low-income housing sections of Mountain View. The high school is accredited by the Western Association of Schools and Colleges.

Tracey Runeare has served as the school principal since 2023, succeeding Wynne Satterwhite, who served from 2005 to 2022, and George Perez, who served until 2004.

== History ==
Los Altos High School was established in 1954 on the site of an orchard. Initially, Los Altos High School served the mostly white, middle to upper class populations of Los Altos and Los Altos Hills. During 1981 redistricting efforts, the district closed its oldest high school, Mountain View High School, which was located on Castro Street in downtown Mountain View. Awalt High School was then renamed Mountain View High School, while Los Altos High School replaced its Knight mascot with the Eagle mascot from the old Mountain View High School. The district reaches from Los Altos through Mountain View to San Francisco Bay in the north. Both schools are located near the city border of Los Altos and Mountain View, and each school includes a significant portion of the other city (Los Altos or Mountain View) in its attendance area.

During the El Niño storms of 1998, a tornado ripped through the Theater area of the school. The tornado touched down at 5:05PM on May 4, 1998, near the intersection of El Monte Road and Almond Avenue. It was rated F1 on the Fujita Scale, and was one of two that touched down in the area. It uprooted trees, picked up dumpsters, damaged the tennis court fences, and destroyed the baseball diamond dugout. Damages were estimated at $25,000.

== Statistics and demographics ==
As of the 2003-2004 school year, the enrollment was approximately 1600 students; in a series of years, each incoming class was significantly larger than the outgoing class.

== Education ==
Los Altos High School is a gold-certified high school and ranked 370th nationally in 2026 by U.S. News & World Report. Los Altos High School was ranked 54th in California.

=== Test scores and state-wide ranking ===
In 2006, City-data deemed Los Altos High School to be the 9th best High School in California, with an API of 797. However, Newsweek grades schools on weighted data and teacher to student ratios, while City-Data merely uses API as a standard.

In 2008, the school's performance fell seven points in the API from the previous year, with a final score of 795. Asians lost their score slightly by five points and while students with disabilities lost 25 points from the previous year, while Hispanics and the economically disadvantaged scored higher than the previous year. However, they passed the Federal "Adequate Yearly Progress" standards.

2009 saw an increase of 30 points in the API for the school, with a 34-point increase for Latino students and 64 for English-Language learners. 825 points is the highest in school history.

API scores for the student body overall climbed steadily each year from 799 in 2008 to 875 in 2011.

Beginning in 2016, the state of California switched to a new Common Core based testing through the CAASPP (California Assessment of Student Performance and Progress). Students in the 11th grade who took this test in 2016 averaged in the 85.33rd percentile in ELA, and 96.27th percentile in Mathematics.

=== Educational environment ===
The California Department of Education claims that in 2008-2009, 98% of teachers were fully credentialed—this is higher than the state average. In 2009, Michelle Bissonnette, who taught at Los Altos for 10 years, was selected as one of three "Teaching Ambassador Fellows" to work as a full-time employee of the United States Department of Education for one school year. The student-teacher ratios at Los Altos High School are considerably lower than the state average.

=== Sports ===
Los Altos High School requires two years of Physical Education (PE) credits in order to graduate. 1 full year of P.E. in 9th grade is required. After-school sports each provide one semester of credits. Its sports teams participate in the regional SCVAL League. The track and field team has made it to State championships numerous times, most notably winning 5 CIF-CCS Championship titles, and a CIF state championship title in 1970. Daniel Rosenbaum ('15) played forward for the Eagles basketball team, and was All-League First-Team and All-Daily News First-Team.

| Season | Sport | Season | Sport |
|---|---|---|---|
| Fall | Football | Spring | Track and field |
| Fall | Boys Water polo | Spring | Baseball |
| Fall | Girls Water polo | Spring | Badminton |
| Fall | Volleyball | Spring | Boys Tennis |
| Fall | Girls Tennis | Spring | Gymnastics |
| Fall | Girls Field hockey | Spring | Golf |
| Fall | Cross country | Spring | Softball |
| Fall | Marching band | Spring | Swimming and Diving |
| Fall | | Spring | Lacrosse |
| Winter | Boys Basketball | Spring | |
| Winter | Girls Basketball | Spring | |
| Winter | Wrestling | Spring | |
| Winter | Boys Soccer | Spring | |
| Winter | Girls Soccer | Spring | |

=== Performing arts ===
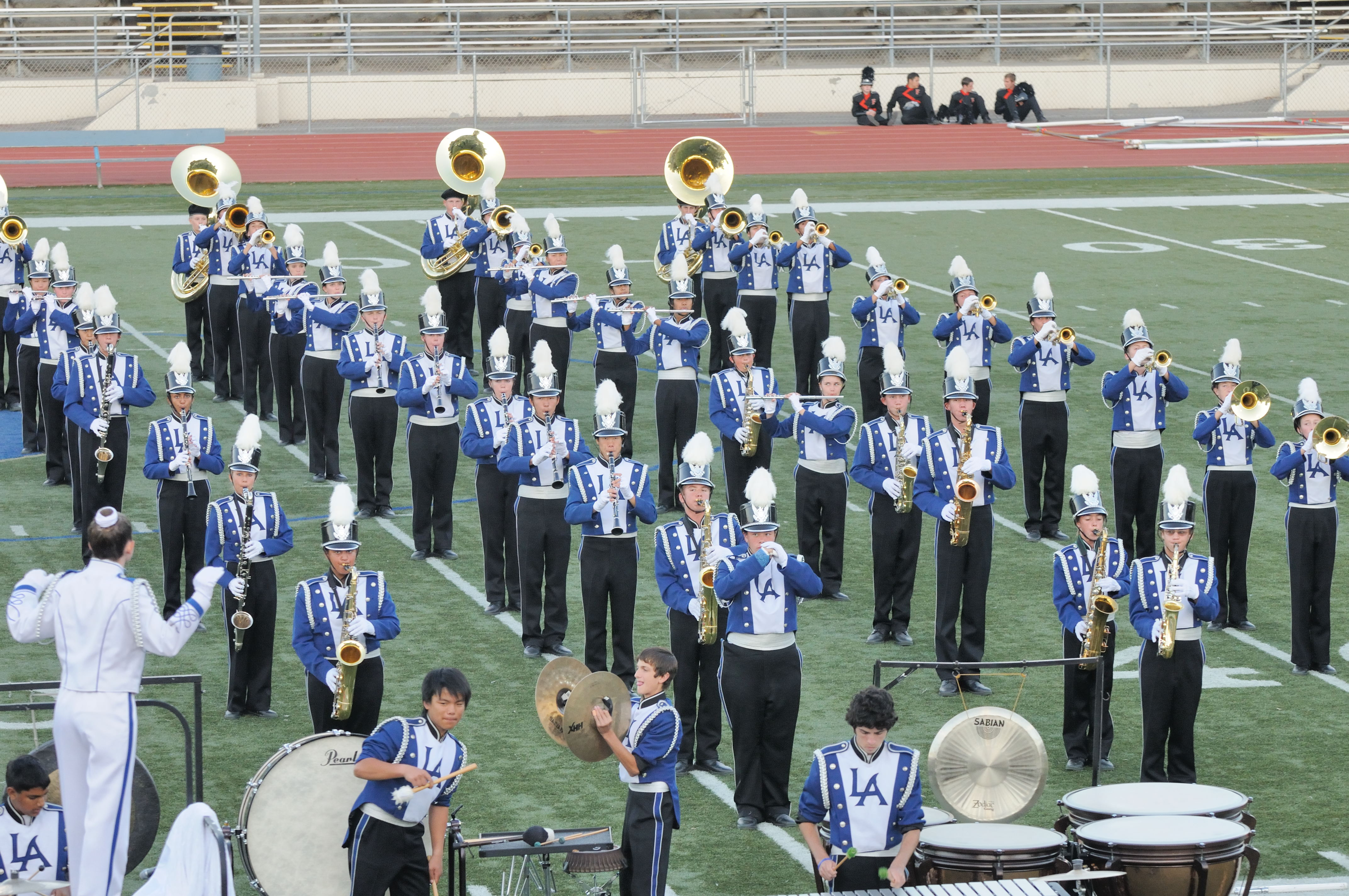
The LAHS Marching Band, performing in uniform.

The musical ensembles included are Auxiliary Units (also known as Color Guard), Marching band, Jazz band, Chamber Ensemble, String Orchestra, Wind Ensemble, Symphonic Band, and Concert Band. Los Altos High School also includes Concert Choir and the world-renowned Main Street Singers.

The school also hosts a Drama department, the advanced course of which is called Broken Box Theatre Company and performs in the school's Eagle Theater.

The school's vocal ensemble, known as the "Main Street Singers" performs internationally.

The High School's Marching band is part of the Western Band Association, which is based in California. The Band competed in the AA and AAA categories however, following the pandemic the band competes in the A and AA categories. In 1997, the LAHS Marching Band received six awards at the state festival. In 2008, the band won its first sweepstakes award in four years, placing 7th out of 48 participating bands at Western Band's state preliminaries. In 2011-2012, the Band's show, "Forbidden", won numerous awards at local competitions, finished 6th statewide at the WBA State Championships in Thousand Oaks, CA, and captured the State's AAA High Music caption award for the first time in school history In that same year, the band won a total of fifteen trophies and were undefeated in music throughout the entire season. The band's 2012 AA show was entitled "Senses" and their 2013 AAA show "REM." The 2014 AAA show was entitled "House of Cards" and won 1st place at all of Gilroy High School, Dublin Irish Guard Invitational and Quest Classic competitions. In 2014, for the first time, the LAHS Marching Band competed in Bands of America regional championships, placing 3rd place in the AAA category. The band's AA show from 2015 was entitled "Muse". In 2015, the band came in 3rd place in the AA category at the Western Band Association 1A-2A-3A Class Championships, earning a spot to compete in the 1A-2A-3A Combined Grand Championships. The band went on to place 8th overall in the combined class championships. The band's 2016 AAA show was entitled "Deja Vu" and their 2017 AA show "Vertigo." The band's 2018 AA show was entitled "Mirage". The band's AA show from 2019 was entitled "Les Plumes". In 2019, the band came in 4th place in the AA category at the Western Band Association 1A-2A-3A Class Championships, earning a spot to compete in the 1A-2A-3A Combined Grand Championships. The band went on to place 18th overall in the combined class championships. There was no show in 2020. The band's 2021 A show was entitled "Masquerade" and their 2022 A show "Dreamscape." The bands 2023 AA show was entitled "All the World's a Stage."

=== School festivities ===
Los Altos High School's ASB (Associated Student Body) and the 4 class councils organize several events throughout the school year including rallies and dances.

A notable event of each school year is homecoming, which includes a football game, a parade in downtown Los Altos, and the yearly nomination process of for the king and queen. Each year, seniors first nominate 20 peers within their own graduating class for the 2 positions. The 20 seniors then break up into groups of 3-4 and create a 2-3 minute video that is played for the entire school during the morning announcements. Finally, the entire school votes for their top 2 and the result is revealed during the halftime show of the homecoming football game with the crowning of the king and queen.

=== Student clubs ===
Students at Los Altos High School have independently started over 50 different clubs, including One Dollar For Life, a non-profit organization founded by history and economics teacher Robert Freeman. It also hosts club extensions of many nationally recognized organizations, such as American Civil Liberties Union, Amnesty International, AVID Council, Club Darfur, Future Business Leaders of America, Gender and Sexuality Awareness (GSA) Club, Key Club, Model United Nations, Safe Ride, and Mock Trial. Coding-focused clubs at the school, namely the Computer Science Club, also participate in Los Altos Hacks, an annual 24-hour hackathon founded by Los Altos High School students. The school also has "student unions" of most ethnic and racial groups present in the school. For example, The BSU (Black Student Union) at Los Altos High School celebrates African American culture. These clubs impact the entire Los Altos community, and in the case of One Dollar For Life and Amnesty International, they impact regions in rural Africa and Haiti, respectively.

The Los Altos Green Team, with the help of Sierra Club officials, urged citizens to sign petitions and presented them to the City Council. This helped create the grassroots for a Los Altos "Cool Cities" campaign to aide the city in becoming more Green; resulting in the city to be included in the Kyoto Protocol through the Mayor's Climate Protection Center. They have also invited an Emmy Award-winning Al Gore-trained speaker to deliver an "update" on An Inconvenient Truth as well as provide tips on making the student's lives more environmentally friendly. They have since started a local sustainable and organic garden and plan to sell subscriptions to local residents.

In addition, class of 2008 and previous president of the school's Gay-Straight Alliance, received an award for his efforts in promoting gay rights at a local level; while joining San Jose city's annual gay-pride parade. In 2004, the Alliance petitioned the Los Altos city council to proclaim a Gay Pride Parade in the city's downtown, which resulted in the passage of language which specifically prohibited religious, racial, ethnic or sexual discrimination-related proclamations. The group, along with the support of San Francisco Mayor Gavin Newsom and then-Supervisor Tom Ammiano, then petitioned the city council to reverse the law, a move which was unanimously approved in 2006. They then organized a Gay Pride parade in downtown Los Altos, with over 300 in attendance. Due to this event, the County of Santa Clara and multiple local cities declared a gay pride day in honor of the club. In addition, the school sponsors a Day of Silence event annually to combat discrimination against LGBT students. As of 2026, the club has been renamed to the Gender and Sexuality Awareness (GSA) club.

Los Altos High School shares a Speech and Debate team with Mountain View High School. The team was founded by Charles Dahan in 1999, with Dahan earning nine Tournament of Champions bids during his debate career. In 2008, Daniel Moerner, class of 2009, won the Walter Alan Ulrich Award for Top Speaker in Lincoln-Douglas Debate at the Tournament of Champions. In 2009, he also became the first debater to ever win the Stanford Invitational and Berkeley National Invitational back-to-back in their 20-year history.

=== Campus ===
Los Altos High School was constructed in 1954 on the site of an orchard.

=== Student publications ===
The Talon is the school's student-run newspaper which has been nationally recognized by the Journalism Education Association and the National Scholastic Press Association. In 1997, it was honored as one of the NSPA's newspaper pacemakers. In 2009, it placed 10th for the NSPA's national Best in Show award in the Newspaper 17+ pages category. They also won several awards for Features writing, Entertainment Review writing, Photography, and Editorial Cartooning. In 2010, The Talon's website, www.lahstalon.org, placed 8th for the NSPA's Best in Show award for publication websites. In 2011, The Talon's website qualified for the Pacemaker online finalists.

== Notable alumni ==
- Ted Barrett (born 1965), MLB umpire
- Steve Centanni, Fox News national correspondent
- Elizabeth Chomko, actress, director and screenwriter
- Stephen Clark (1943-2026), Olympic gold medal winning swimmer
- David DiVincenzo (born 1959), pioneer of quantum computing
- Lorrie Fair and Ronnie Fair (born 1978), twin sisters who played for USA National Soccer team, and later became professional soccer players
- Juliette Fretté, June 2008 Playboy Playmate of the Month
- Tom Harrell, musician
- Erik Johnson (born 1989), MLB baseball player
- John Brady Kiesling, former U.S. foreign service officer and author
- Raj Mathai, Emmy Award-winning news anchor
- Steven McCarroll, professor of genetics at Harvard Medical School
- Sepideh Moafi, singer, actress
- Theodore Olson, 42nd United States Solicitor General
- Daniel Rosenbaum (born 1997), American-Israeli professional basketball player for Hapoel Jerusalem
- Simon Rosenbaum (born 1993), American-Israeli baseball player with Team Israel
- Nick Swinmurn, founder of Zappos.com
- Talise Trevigne (born 1974), opera singer
- Alice Wu, film director and screenwriter

== Notable faculty ==
- Sandy Wihtol, head baseball coach
