= Steven McCarroll =

American geneticist and neuroscientist (born 1970)

Steven A. McCarroll
- Born: Steven Andrew McCarroll; July 13, 1970 (age 56)
- Education: Stanford University (B.A.); University of California, San Francisco (Ph.D.)
- Scientific career
- Fields: Genetics, Neuroscience
- Workplaces: Harvard Medical School, Broad Institute, HHMI
- Thesis: The statistical and molecular logic of gene expression patterns in Caenorhabditis elegans (2004)
- Doctoral advisor: Cori Bargmann
- Other academic advisors: David Altshuler, Mark Daly
- Website: McCarroll Lab

Steven A. McCarroll (born 1970) is an American geneticist and neuroscientist who is the Dorothy and Milton Flier Professor of Biomedical Science and Genetics at Harvard Medical School. He is also an institute member of the Broad Institute and an HHMI investigator.

== Biography ==
McCarroll graduated from Los Altos High School in Los Altos, California, in 1989. He then studied at Stanford University, earning a B.A. in economics in 1993. While at Stanford, McCarroll was a staff writer and opinions editor for The Stanford Daily newspaper. After college, he worked as a fellow at the Office of Science and Technology Policy and as a research assistant at the Brookings Institution. Ultimately, inspired by a former roommate who was pursuing a biochemistry Ph.D., McCarroll shifted his focus away from economics and to biology. He earned a Ph.D. in neuroscience from the University of California, San Francisco in 2004, where he worked in the lab of Cori Bargmann. Following his Ph.D., he worked as a postdoctoral fellow with David Altshuler and Mark Daly at Massachusetts General Hospital and the Broad Institute.

== Research ==
McCarroll's lab studies natural variation in the human brain and the ways in which genes and genetic variation shape the brain's functions and vulnerabilities. Research in his lab has explored the contribution of variation in complement component 4 to schizophrenia risk, revealed a mechanism by which CAG repeat expansion may drive neurodegeneration in Huntington's disease, and uncovered ways in which human genetic variation influences host-microbe interactions and the oral microbiome.
