= Scottsdale Public Library =

Library system for Scottsdale, Arizona

Coordinates: 33.4919°N 111.9205°W

- Location: Scottsdale
- Type: Public library system
- Established: 1955
- Branches: 4

Collection
- Size: 800,000 (est)

Access and use
- Circulation: 2,984,776 items per year

Other information
- Director: Michael Beck
- Website: https://www.scottsdalelibrary.org

The Scottsdale Public Library is the public library system for Scottsdale, Arizona, and is owned and operated by the City of Scottsdale. As of 2023 the library system serves Scottsdale’s 226,918 residents, residents of Maricopa County, and numerous visitors from around the world. The library’s collection contains over 800,000 items (including books, magazines, DVDs, CDs, audio books and more). The library circulates around 2.9 million items per year.

== Mission statement ==
As Scottsdale's population continues to increase, the mission of the Scottsdale Public Library System is stated as: “Putting People at the Heart of Dynamic Library Services.”

== History ==
The Scottsdale Public Library was started in the summer of 1955 by Lou Ann Noel and Beth Fielder. Located in the un-air-conditioned Adobe House, which at the time served as a community center, the library was originally open for only two hours, two mornings a week, and its collection consisted of 300 donated books.

In 1958 the Friends of the Library, a non-profit, community organization made up entirely of volunteers, was organized to support and fund-raise for the library. In 1960 the City of Scottsdale assumed responsibility for the library and hired the first professionally trained librarian. Later, the City hired additional paid staff to keep up with the demands of the community and, in 1968, opened a new 37,000-square-foot (3,400 m^{2}) main library.

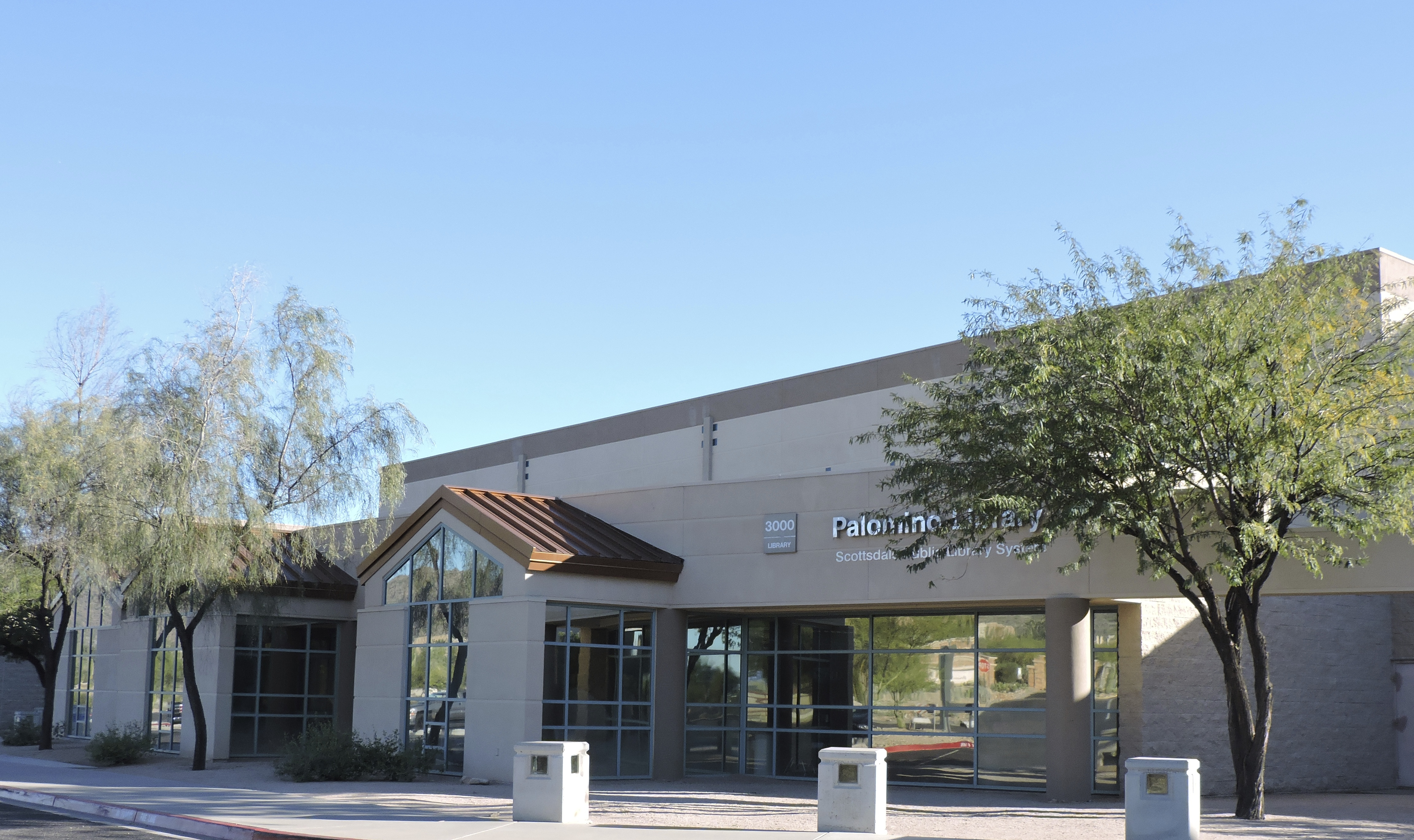
Palomino Library

Much has changed since the library’s conception in 1955: four branches were added, buildings and services have been renovated and expanded, staff and volunteers have come and gone, and technology has been upgraded with the times. The days of card catalogs may be over, but the library still plays a vital role in the lives and education of Scottsdale residents.

The Palomino Library opened in 1995 as a shared-use facility on the campus of Desert Mountain High School and served both the public and the school’s students and staff. This location reverted back to a school library only on May 21, 2020 after the intergovernmental agreement between the City of Scottsdale and the Scottsdale Unified School District was phased out.

== Branches ==
The Scottsdale Public Library system has four active locations: a main library and three branches—Mustang, Arabian, and Appaloosa—which, in keeping with the city's western culture, were named after horse breeds. Since 2011, Civic Center and Mustang Libraries have been among 450 libraries in 29 states that have received the designation of Family Place Libraries™ for their welcoming, child friendly environments. Family Place believes good health, early learning, parental involvement and supportive communities contribute to the growth and development of children. Designated libraries offer a five-week parent/child workshop, appropriate collections and space, as well as staff trained in family support.

- Civic Center, the main library, is located in the Civic Center plaza in downtown Scottsdale. The library was opened November 26, 1968. It is home to the Scottsdale Room which contains numerous books, maps, photographs, and pieces of artwork that focus on Scottsdale, Arizona and the surrounding area.
- Mustang Library opened on June 13, 1987 and is the first and the largest of the Scottsdale branches. At the time of its opening, it was the largest branch library in the state.
- Arabian Library originally opened in 1996 as a shared-use facility on the campus of Desert Canyon Elementary and Middle Schools. In 2007, the library separated from the schools and relocated to a new building across the street from its original location. The design of the new Arabian Library draws inspiration from the natural formations of slot canyons in northern Arizona and Monument Valley, combining modern functionality with aesthetic beauty. The library opened to the public in its new location in 2007. Since completion, the library has received national recognition in the form of publications and awards. In 2023, the Arabian Library was named one of Architectural Digest's "15 Most Futuristic Libraries" worldwide. For its innovative design, the library also won the 2008 International Interior Design Association/Metropolis Smart Environments Award.
- Appaloosa Library opened on November 4, 2009 on the grounds previously occupied by the Rawhide Wild West Town. It is a LEED Gold Certified building and winner of multiple architecture awards.
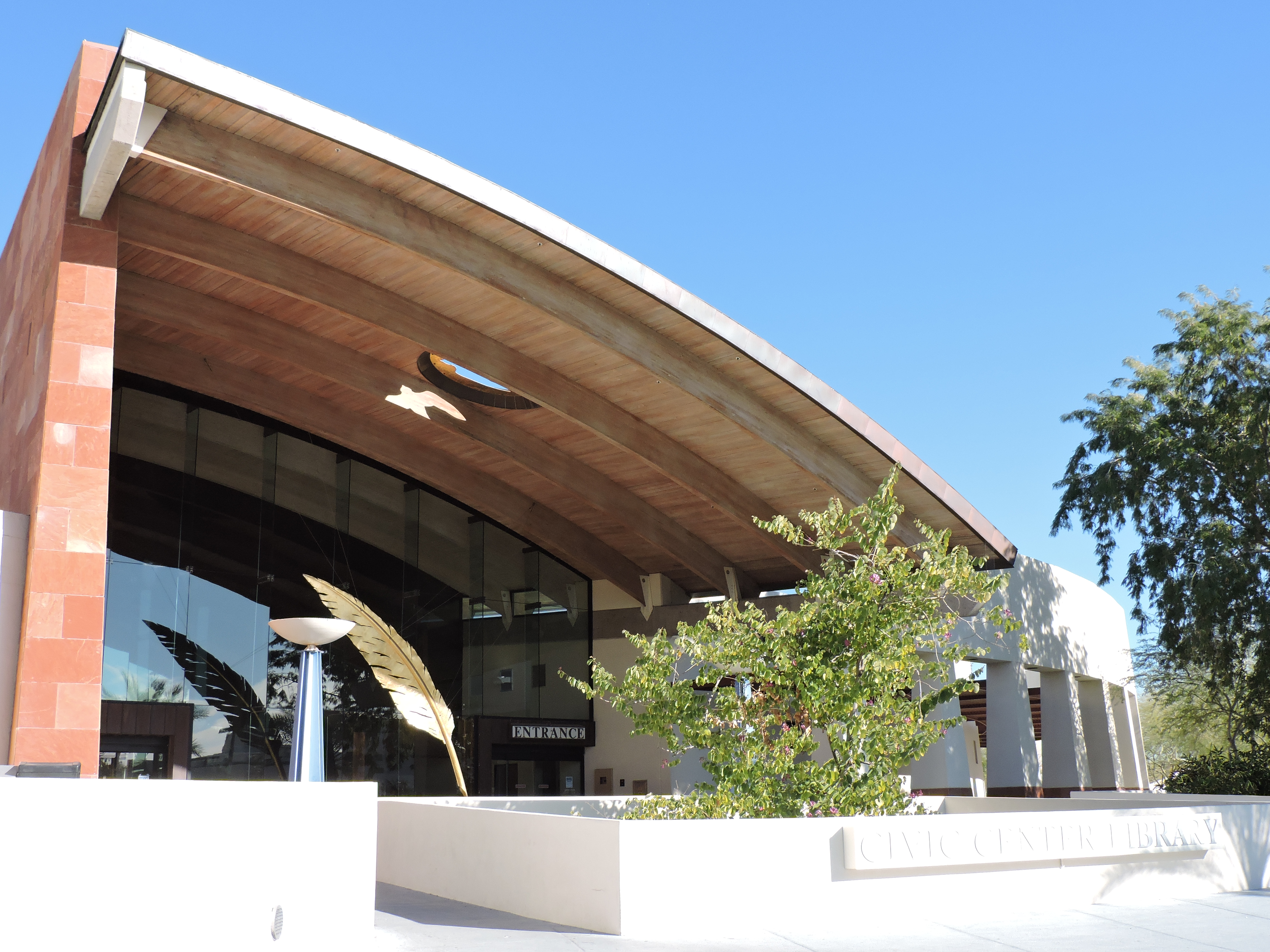
Civic Center Library

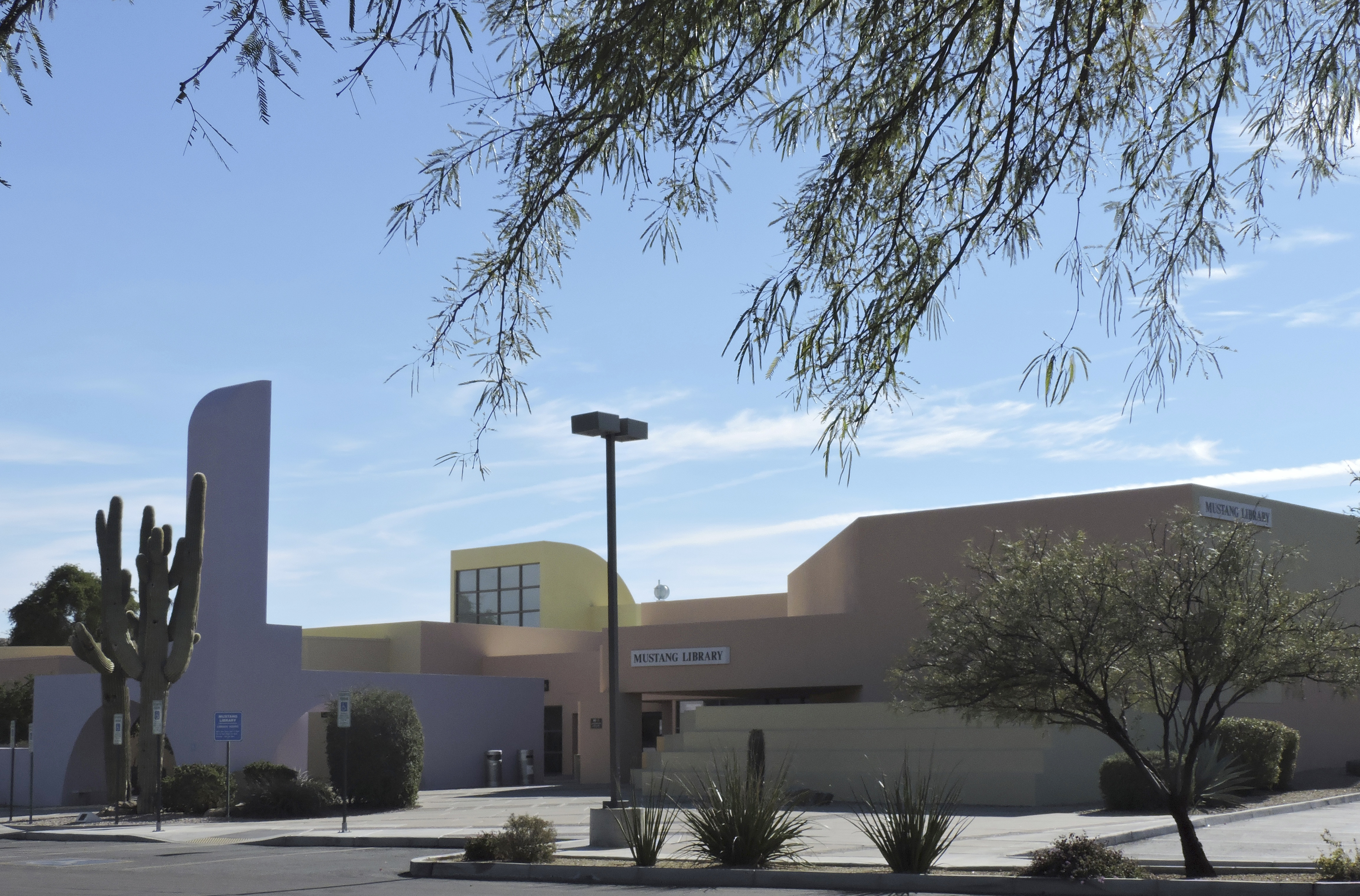
Mustang Library

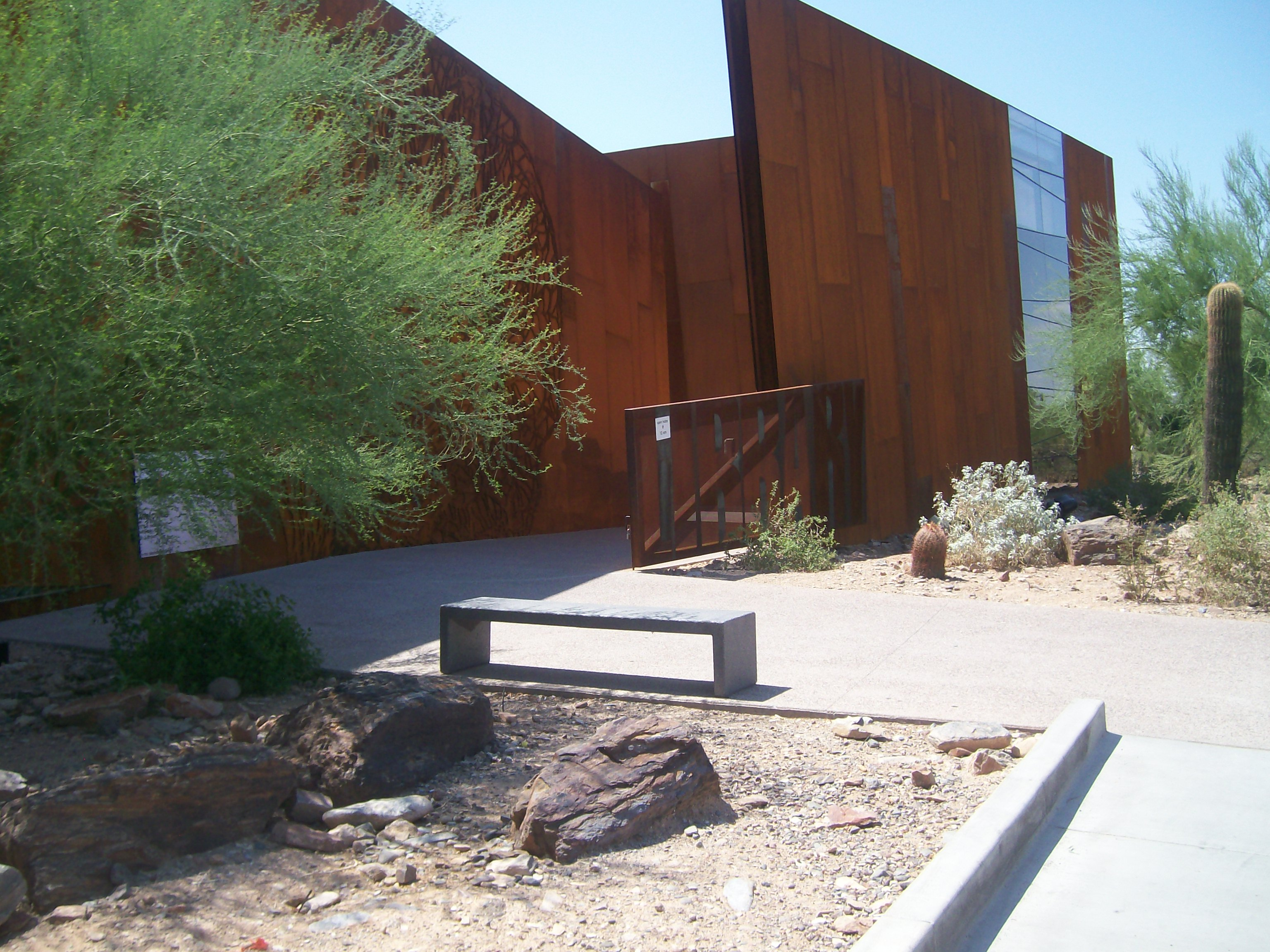
Arabian Library

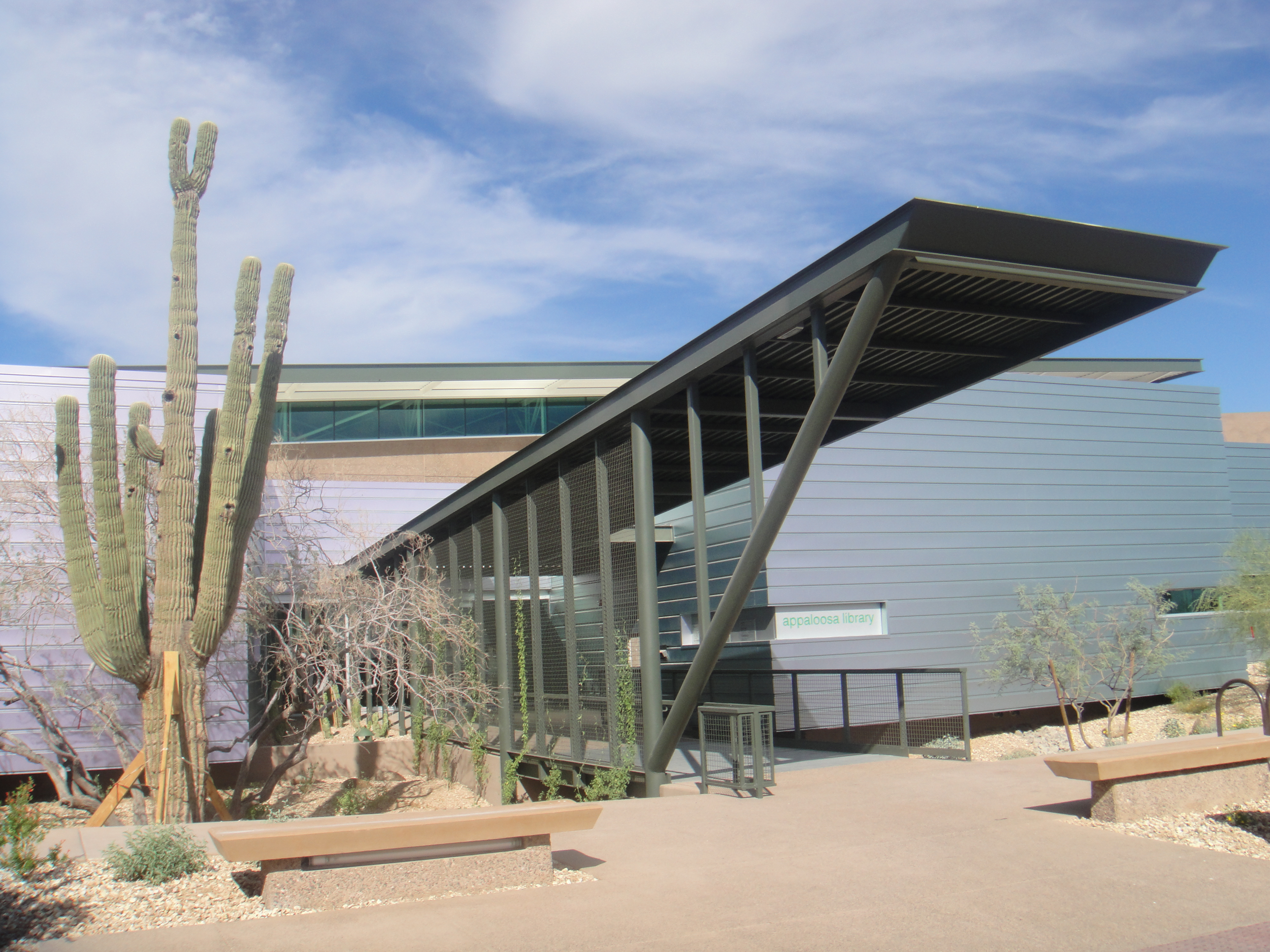
Appaloosa Library
