= One Dollar For Life =

American fundraising organization

One Dollar For Life (ODFL)
- Founded: 2006, Los Altos, California
- Purpose: Charity
- Location: 3833 Park Blvd, #16 Palo Alto, California
- Region served: South Africa, Malawi, Nepal, Kenya, Zambia, Nicaragua, Ivory Coast, Indonesia
- Method: Fundraisers, Awareness
- Website: odfl.org

One Dollar For Life, or otherwise known as ODFL is an IRS Registered 501(c)3 non-profit organization founded to address third world poverty on the premise of collecting one dollar from each of millions of US high school students and then channeling those funds into small-scale infrastructure projects in developing countries. It was founded in 2006 at Los Altos High School in the San Francisco Bay Area by history and economics teacher Robert Freeman and science teacher Lisa Cardellini.

ODFL works with qualified Non Governmental Organizations (NGOs) in the developing world to fund and implement such projects as schools, water wells, irrigation systems, sanitary waste disposal, vaccinations, and other simple, low cost projects. These projects have the potential to dramatically improve the capacity for self-sustenance for tens of millions of people.

== History ==
One Dollar For Life was founded in 2006 at Los Altos High School (Los Altos, California) during an economics class. The class was asked to devise a plan to help people around the world, and the idea of ODFL was born. “The average kid in our school contributed 93 cents each, but these kids put an average of $11 apiece into the box,” says Robert Freeman. “It made me cry because these were the poorest kids in the school. But they understood how important it is to help someone else.”

The organization became a reality in 2007 when students began campaigning within the school through a class-to-class speaking tour. Throughout the school year, they managed to raise $9,000 at Los Altos High School, which they used on the summer of 2007 in Kenya to build a schoolhouse, a project spearheaded by student president Mandeep Chahal, and advertised by student photographer Margaret Lewis.

== Impact and projects ==
ODFL works to help install small infrastructure projects, such as water wells, irrigation systems, sanitary waste disposal systems, and similar such projects that have a low cost but a high impact on small villages.

Its maiden project was the construction of a school in Naro Moru, Kenya, which cost $9,400 to build. The schoolhouse was furnished with materials to help educate fifty children who previously learned in a barn house. Since then, the organization has sent 452 bikes to children in Kenya whose homes were located far from the local schools, as well as the donation of milk cows, the construction of two more schools in various other locations in Kenya, and an upgrade for a woman's clinic in Nairobi.

Besides Kenya, ODFL volunteers in partnership with the Nepalese Youth Opportunity Foundation have additionally constructed schools in Nepal, and prevented young girls from being sold into sexual slavery by donating livestock to their parents instead of prostitution money. They have also aided the local Second Harvest of Silicon Valley chapter by raising 4,000 pounds of canned food. The organization has also worked with school-based clubs at Los Altos, Mountain View, and Fremont High Schools to raise money and aide the relief efforts in China following the Sichuan earthquake. They donated $3,000 to the Red Cross.

ODFL's largest project was announced in January 2009, a plan that involves the entire population of the city of Burlingame, which includes 25,000 people. The plan to raise at least $18,000 in one month and send them to Kasimu Education Fund in order to construct two-room high school in a village where they previously built a secondary school.

== Funding ==
ODFL works with students at American high schools. They run a fund raiser at their school where they ask each student to give Just One Dollar. ODFL takes these funds and combines them with other schools’ funds to pay for the projects. Each school is able to follow the progress of its funds to see how they have helped improve the lives of other people.

Throughout 2007–2008, ODFL plans to complete 2-5 more projects along with completing fund raisers at 50-100 more schools.

== Reaction ==
In today’s post-9/11 society, a global approach is needed more than ever. We have global warming, ozone depletion, species extinction, and problems of such magnitude that no nation by itself can fix these problems that threaten humanity. It’s that mindset of self-interest, competition and isolation that has brought us to where we are now. It’s time for kids to become effective by being cooperative, compassionate and connected. You can call it the 3 C’s.

— Robert Freeman

The organization was described as part of a "generation of post-9/11 children". San Francisco Chronicle hypothesized that it was a direct result of them being "the first set of students to be taught by teachers who were required to do community service in order to get a high school diploma."

Macheru Karuku, a Kenyan official who oversaw the numerous school-building campaigns throughout Kenya was afraid that the volunteers might act negatively, and was "encouraged when I talked with them later and they realized how lucky they were to be living in good houses back in America, adding that they would never forget what they had seen."

Because of the enormous need of American teenagers to "find a purpose larger than themselves," as described by ODFL, students from an Arizona high school have rebuilt a school in post-Hurricane Katrina New Orleans, while high schools from Florida and New York have requested fundraiser boxes to host in their respective schools.

Jody Hare, a teacher at West High School remarked the speed and efficiency in which the projects were completed, saying "Within three months of the fundraiser we could see pictures of what our students’ money was doing." Students have also expressed gratitude to the organization, saying, "I’ve never been able to feel I could actually do good in the world. Now I can see that I can."
