= Dylan Cozens (baseball) =

American baseball player (born 1994)

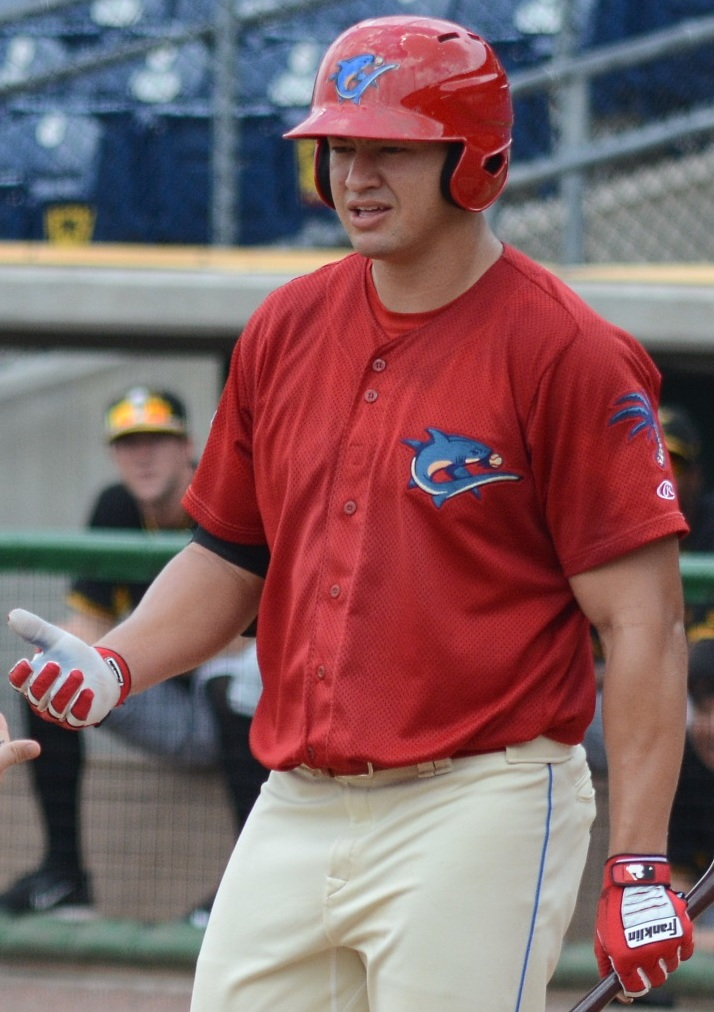
- Cozens with the Clearwater Threshers in 2015
- Outfielder
- Born: May 31, 1994 (age 32); Scottsdale, Arizona, U.S.
- Batted: Left Threw: Left

MLB debut
- June 1, 2018, for the Philadelphia Phillies

Last MLB appearance
- April 26, 2019, for the Philadelphia Phillies

MLB statistics
- Batting average: .154
- Home runs: 1
- Runs batted in: 2
- Stats at Baseball Reference

Teams
- Philadelphia Phillies (2018–2019)

Dylan Wallace Cozens (pronounced KUH-zins; born May 31, 1994) is an American former professional baseball outfielder and professional football defensive lineman. He was a second-round pick (77th overall) in the 2012 MLB draft by the Philadelphia Phillies, and played in Major League Baseball (MLB) for the team from 2018 to 2019.

== Early life ==
Cozens was born in Scottsdale, Arizona. His father Randy played football for four years as a defensive lineman at the University of Pittsburgh, and was drafted in the 17th round of the 1976 NFL draft by the Denver Broncos, but never played for them.

Cozens initially attended Desert Mountain High School in Arizona, but was suspended midway through his junior year for an altercation with his baseball coach. Baseball writer Keith Law reported that Cozens "shoved his coach and told him to 'f off' in the dugout during a game, so he was kicked off the team - the culmination of a series of incidents that turned many scouts off him, one even calling him a 'bully'".

That led to Cozens transferring to Chaparral High School. Due to his transfer, Cozens was forced to sit out the rest of his junior season due to eligibility restrictions. As a senior, Cozens posted a .520 batting average, and hit 19 home runs, in 33 games, breaking the school's single-season record, formerly held by longtime Chicago White Sox first baseman Paul Konerko. His 19 home runs led the state and were second nationally only to the 21 hit by future major leaguer Joey Gallo. He ended the season by hitting a walk-off home run in the bottom of the seventh inning of the Division I state championship, winning the title. He played that season alongside future Team Israel outfielder/first baseman Jeremy Wolf.

Cozens' also was a standout defensive end on Chaparral's football team and verbally committed to play for the Arizona Wildcats football team before opting to sign with the Phillies.

== Baseball career ==
=== Philadelphia Phillies ===
As a scout for the Philadelphia Phillies, Marti Wolever, among other representatives of the organization, evaluated Cozens before the 2012 MLB draft and watched him during a workout at Citizens Bank Park. Though there were some concerns about Cozens’ temperament, the Phillies selected him in the second round with the 77th overall selection of the draft, and he signed a contract with a $659,800 signing bonus. "That was probably the guy I was most excited about", said Phillies general manager Rubén Amaro Jr., "Extraordinary power for a kid -- great body, runs well, seems to move pretty well".

Cozens began the 2012 season with the Gulf Coast Phillies of the Rookie-level Gulf Coast League. In 50 games, he batted .255 with five home runs and 24 runs batted in (RBIs). The Phillies promoted Cozens to the Williamsport Crosscutters of the Low–A New York–Penn League the following year. He finished the season second in the league in doubles (19), extra base hits (30), and runs (50) while also ranking third in slugging percentage (.469). Cozens struck out 147 times in his first full season of professional baseball for the Lakewood BlueClaws of the Single–A South Atlantic League. In 2015, he shared time with the Blueclaws and the Reading Fightin' Phils of the Double–A Eastern League.

During the Fightin Phils' 2016 season, Cozens hit 40 home runs, the most by any Eastern Leaguer since Ron Kittle in 1981, topping the team's single-season record set by Darin Ruf four years prior, and earning him the Joe Bauman Home Run Award for the most home runs on the season by a minor leaguer; he led the league in runs scored (106), extra-base hits (81), total bases (308), doubles (38), RBI (125) and slugging percentage (.591). His production helped the team finish with a league-best 89-52 record. However, Cozens batted just .197 off left-handed pitching, and struggled to make contact, striking out a league-leading 186 times, in 521 at-bats. MLB.com ranked him as the seventh-best prospect in the Phillies farm system and the Phils added Cozens to their 40-man roster.

Cozens spent the 2017 season with the Lehigh Valley IronPigs of the Triple–A International League, where he struggled to make contact consistently; Cozens batted .210, with 27 home runs, and 75 RBI, but led the league with 194 strikeouts. He was named an International League All Star.

The emergence of Rhys Hoskins and Cozens' high strikeout ratio dashed his opportunity to obtain a spot on the Phillies' Opening Day roster, in 2018. He began the 2018 season with Lehigh Valley, with whom he batted .246/.345/.529 with 21 home runs (tied for 3rd in International League), and 58 RBI, in 348 at bats. Cozens was the International League Batter of the Week and Phillies Minor League Player of the Week for July 23–29.

In 2019 Cozens started the season with Lehigh Valley, but his season was believed to have ended early due to foot surgery in May to remove a bone spur and repair cartilage in his left big toe. He batted .167/.333/.462 with six home runs and five steals in 78 at bats before he was injured. He was designated for assignment by the Phillies on July 31.

==== Major leagues ====
Cozens was promoted to the Major Leagues on May 31, 2018, to replace Hoskins while he was on the disabled list. Cozens debuted on June 1, against the San Francisco Giants and recorded his first major league hit in the same game, hitting a single on the first pitch he saw (becoming the first Phillie to get his first major league hit on the first pitch he saw since Steve Montgomery on June 11, 1999). Cozens hit his first big league home run on June 7 against Chicago Cubs reliever Brandon Morrow. He was recalled as a September call up (when MLB rosters expanded), on September 1. In 2018, Cozens batted .158/.273/.289 in 38 at–bats for the Phillies with a home run, a stolen base, and two RBIs.

In 2019 Cozens batted .167/.333/.462 with six home runs and 15 RBI and 42 strikeouts in 78 at bats for Lehigh Valley, and had one hitless at bat for the Phillies, before he was injured and ultimately designated for assignment on July 31. He was released on August 1.

=== Tampa Bay Rays ===
On August 10, 2019, Cozens signed a two-year minor league contract with the Tampa Bay Rays and was assigned to the Triple–A Durham Bulls, and was placed back on the injured list. He returned to action on a four-game rehab assignment with the Gulf Coast League Rays on August 22, then returned from the injured list on August 31, debuting for Durham the following day and playing two games with them.

Cozens did not play in a game in 2020 due to the cancellation of the minor league season because of the COVID-19 pandemic. He became a free agent on November 2, 2020.

=== Milwaukee Brewers ===
On December 17, 2020, Cozens signed a minor league contract with the Milwaukee Brewers organization.

== Football career ==
Dylan Cozens
Profile
- Position: Defensive lineman

Personal information
- Born: May 31, 1994 (age 32); Scottsdale, Arizona, U.S.
- Listed height: 6 ft 6 in (1.98 m)
- Listed weight: 245 lb (111 kg)

Career information
- High school: Chaparral (Scottsdale, Arizona)

Career history
- Tucson Sugar Skulls (2023)

Cozens announced his retirement on June 22, 2021, in order to pursue a career in professional football. He stated that he was going to "chase my dream of playing in the NFL (National Football League)". Cozens worked out for the New England Patriots of the National Football League (NFL) on August 5, 2021.

On July 6, 2023, Cozens signed with the Tucson Sugar Skulls of the Indoor Football League. He was released by the Sugar Skulls on October 23.
