= Daniel Rosenbaum =

American basketball player

Daniel Rosenbaum דניאל רוזנבאום
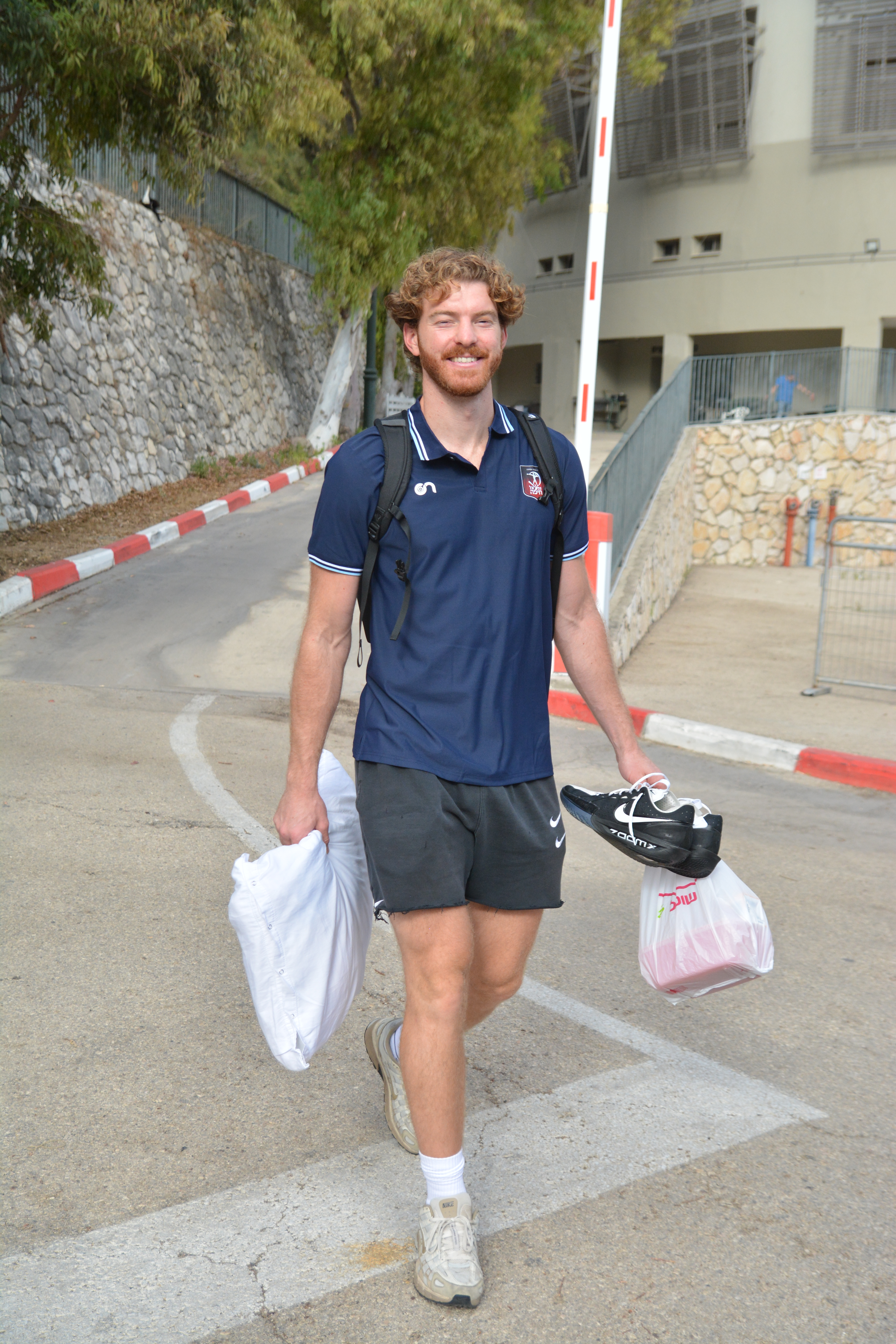
- Rosenbaum in 2025

No. 5 – Hapoel Ironi Eilat
- Position: Shooting guard
- League: Israeli Basketball Premier League

Personal information
- Born: February 11, 1997 (age 29) Los Altos Hills, California, U.S.
- Listed height: 6 ft 5 in (1.96 m)

Career information
- High school: Los Altos (Los Altos, California)
- College: Pomona (2015–2019)
- NBA draft: 2019: undrafted
- Playing career: 2019–present

Career history
- 2019–2021: Hapoel Jerusalem
- 2021–2022: Elitzur Eito Ashkelon
- 2022–2023: Ironi Ramat Gan
- 2023–2024: Hapoel Galil Elyon
- 2024–2026: Hapoel Haifa
- 2026–present: Hapoel Ironi Eilat

Career highlights
- Israeli National League champion (2023); NCAA Division III All-American (2019); SCIAC Player of the Year (2019); 2× First-team All-SCIAC (2018, 2019); SCIAC Newcomer of the Year (2016)

Daniel Rosenbaum (Hebrew: דניאל רוזנבאום; born February 11, 1997) is an American-Israeli professional basketball player for Hapoel Ironi Eilat of the Israeli Basketball Premier League. He plays the shooting guard position.

Born in Los Altos Hills, California, Rosenbaum played college basketball for the Pomona-Pitzer Sagehens, where he was named an NCAA Division III All-American and the Southern California Intercollegiate Athletic Conference (SCIAC) Player of the Year in 2019. He moved to Israel to play professionally, appearing for clubs including Hapoel Jerusalem, Hapoel Haifa, and Maccabi Ironi Ramat Gan, winning a National League championship with the latter in 2023.

== Early life ==
Rosenbaum is 195 cm (6 ft 5 in) tall.

He was born in Los Altos Hills, California, and is Jewish. His father Amir was born in Israel, and immigrated to the United States as a child. His paternal grandfather was born in Germany. His older brother Simon Rosenbaum is a baseball player for the Israel National Baseball Team.

== High school ==
Rosenbaum attended Los Altos High School ('15). He played forward for the Eagles basketball team, and was All-League First-Team, All-Daily News First-Team, and All-Mercury News Second-Team; he also played for the high school volleyball team.

== College ==
Rosenbaum attended Pomona College ('19) majoring in computer science, earned a 3.84 GPA, and played for the Pomona-Pitzer Sagehens in the Southern California Intercollegiate Athletic Conference (SCIAC).

In 2015-16 he averaged 16.4 points (5th in the conference), 4.6 rebounds, and 1.8 assists per game while shooting 82.6% from the free throw line (2nd) in 24 starts. He was named 2016 SCIAC Newcomer of the Year. In 2016-17 he averaged 14.7 points (8th in the conference), 6.3 rebounds (6th), and 2.3 assists per game while shooting 46.2% from the field, 41.2% from three-point range, and 89.8% from the free throw line (2nd) in 26 starts. He was named Second Team All-Southern California Intercollegiate Athletic Conference.

In 2017-18 he averaged 15.6 points (9th in the conference), 6.9 rebounds (6th), and 2.0 assists per game while shooting 50.8% from the field (3rd) and 43.6% from three-point range in 27 starts. He was named First Team All-SCIAC.

In 2018–19 as team captain he averaged 18.9 points (4th in the conference), 5.9 rebounds, and 2.0 assists per game. He shot 54.5% from the field (2nd), 41.8% from three-point range, and 84.8% from the free throw line (leading the conference), in 29 starts.

He was voted to the 2019 Google Cloud Academic All-America Team for men's basketball selected by the College Sports Information Directors of America, and named a D3hoops.com Third Team All-American. He was also named the 2019 SCIAC Athlete of the Year, First Team All-SCIAC, First Team All-West Region, to the D3hoops.com All-West team, and a First Team All-West Region selection by the National Association of Basketball Coaches. He ended his career at the school No. 2 on its all-time career scoring list with 1,744 points, and fourth in career three-pointers made with 164.

== Professional career ==
=== Hapoel Jerusalem (2019–20) ===
Rosenbaum moved to Israel and began his professional basketball career with Hapoel Jerusalem in the top-tier Israeli Basketball Premier League. During the 2019–20 regular season, he appeared in 23 games as a reserve player. He averaged 5.7 minutes, 0.8 points, and 1.1 rebounds per game.

=== Hapoel Ramat Gan Givatayim (2020–21) ===
To gain more consistent professional playing experience, he was loaned to Hapoel Ramat Gan Givatayim for the 2020–21 season. He played 28 games, and averaged 25.8 minutes, 7.1 points, 4.4 rebounds, and 1.0 assists per game.

=== Elitzur Eito Ashkelon (2021–2022) ===
Rosenbaum signed with Elitzur Eito Ashkelon of the Israeli National League for the 2021–22 campaign. In 21 regular-season games, he averaged 29.7 minutes, 13.3 points, 5.0 rebounds, and 2.2 assists per game. He shot 52.0% from the field, and 43.8% on three-pointers.

=== Maccabi Ironi Ramat Gan (2022–2023) ===
Rosenbaum played for Maccabi Ironi Ramat Gan in 2022–23. He primarily functioned as a postseason player, playing 10 games during the league playoffs. In the postseason he averaged 24.8 minutes, 8.6 points, 3.2 rebounds, and 1.6 assists per game.

=== Hapoel Galil Elyon (2023–2024) ===
Rosenbaum played with Hapoel Galil Elyon in the Israeli Basketball Premier League in the 2023–24 season. In15 games, he averaged 14.3 minutes, 3.1 points, 2.3 rebounds, and 0.7 assists[ per game. During the State Cup matches, he averaged 26.0 minutes, 9.0 points 1.0 rebounds, and 1.0 assists per game. He transferred teams on on March 13, 2024, midway through the season.

=== Hapoel Haifa (2024–2026) ===
Rosenbaum transferred to Hapoel Haifa of the Israeli Basketball Premier League midway through the 2023–24 season. He played in 16 Premier League games, averaging 21.8 minutes, 6.6 points, 2.7 rebounds, and 0.9 assists per game, while shooting 45.8% from the field.

He extended his contract with Hapoel Haifa for the 2024–25 Israeli Basketball Premier League season. He played in 32 games,and averaged 25.3 minutes, 9.0 points, 3.1 rebounds, and 0.9 assists per game. He shot 49.4% from the field, and 42.9% from three-point range.

In 2025–26, Rosenbaum started all 32 of the team's games, leading the team with 34.2 minutes per game, and had career-highs of 14.0 points, 4.5 rebounds, and 2.3 assists per game. He made 62.9% of his two-point field goal attempts, and 86.8% of his free throws. Defensively, he had 1.6 steals per game. His 51 total steals ranked 8th among all players in the league.

=== Hapoel Ironi Eilat (2026–present) ===
On July 28, 2026, Rosenbaum signed with Hapoel Ironi Eilat of the Israeli Basketball Premier League.
