= Desert Mountain High School =

Public school in Scottsdale, Arizona, US

Location
- 12575 East Via Linda; Scottsdale, Arizona; United States; 33°35′19″N 111°48′37″W

Information
- Type: Secondary public school
- Established: 1995
- School district: Scottsdale Unified School District
- Principal: John Andrews (2024–)
- Teaching staff: 93.70 (FTE)
- Grades: 9–12
- Enrollment: 1,940 (2023–2024)
- Student to teacher ratio: 20.70
- Colors: Maroon, gray, and white
- Mascot: Wolf
- Accreditation: North Central Association of Colleges and Secondary School Systems
- Newspaper: Wolf's Print
- Yearbook: Archives
- Website: desertmountain.susd.org

Desert Mountain High School (DMHS) is a public high school in northeast Scottsdale, Arizona, which opened in the fall of 1995. It is the newest of five high schools in the Scottsdale Unified School District. The school has four computer labs, media studio, theater, college/career center, yearbook/newspaper production labs, child development department, business-regulated curriculum, off-school campus medical education facilities and extensive athletic facilities.

Desert Mountain has a two-semester scheduling format to serve its student population of almost 2,300 students in grades nine through twelve.

In 1998, Desert Mountain became an International Baccalaureate Member School and is a magnet program for the Scottsdale Unified School District. Desert Mountain offers students the choice of standard, honors, Advanced Placement and International Baccalaureate classes. Special programs are available for gifted (including Advanced Placement), English Language Learners and Special Education students. Extensive vocational programs are available through a partnership with the East Valley Institute of Technology (EVIT).

== Library ==
The school's library was shared with the Scottsdale Public Library system as the Palomino Branch Library until 2020. It opened with the rest of the school in August 1995. The library features 18,000 square feet (1,700 m^{2}) of space. At the time of its opening, the then-50,000-volume collection was 60% owned by the library and 40% by the school. It was the district's first such combined library.

== Academics, honors and awards ==
The Desert Mountain faculty includes five administrators, nine professional support staff members and one hundred twenty-three teachers, of whom seventy-five hold master's degrees and seven hold doctorates.

Desert Mountain High School is accredited by North Central Association of Colleges and Secondary Schools. It is a member of the National Association for College Admission Counseling and complies with the NACAC Statement of Principles of Good Practice.

Desert Mountain High School has been ranked by Newsweek as one of the top 1300 public high schools in the country. It is one of a handful of public high schools in Arizona to make the list, and was ranked 867th.

In 2013, U.S. News listed the school among the top 22,000 public high schools in the United States. It ranked No. 18 on the list among Arizona schools.

Desert Mountain is also one of the few SUSD schools that has an active International Baccalaureate (IB) program for students to join.

The DMHS FIRST Robotics Competition, Team 6314 "DM Robotics The WolfPack" restarted in 2016, and with a successful rookie season, made it all the way to the FIRST Championships in Houston, TX in 2017 and won the Carver Subdivision, where their alliance ranked 3rd overall at the World Championships. In 2018, the team won the Regional Chairman's Award at the Arizona North Regional, the most prestigious award in FIRST, and competed again at the World Championships in Houston, TX.

== Extracurricular activities ==
Students participate in a variety of extracurricular activities including Student Council, National Honor Society, performing arts, and athletics at the freshman, junior varsity, and varsity levels. The school has over fifty student clubs and organizations.

Desert Mountain's DMHS Players was the only Arizona high school drama club invited to perform at the world's largest arts festival, the 2009 Edinburgh Fringe in Scotland, nominated for their production of Urinetown: The Musical. The DMHS Players also received numerous awards at the 2008 Center Stage Awards including Best Play, for their production of The Importance of Being Earnest. In 2003, the DMHS Players' production of "The Winter's Tale" competed at the International Thespian Society's state competition and took 1st Place. It then received the honor of being chosen as one of only 10 plays in the USA to compete at the International Thespian Society's National competition in Lincoln, Nebraska in 2004.

Desert Mountain's Invisible Children Club has been the recipient of multiple awards, including multiple club of the quarter/year awards and three Schools for Schools awards. Since its inception, it has raised over $50,000.

Desert Mountain's Marching Band was invited to perform in the 2019 London New Year's Day Parade. This was the third time, after already performing in it in 2011 and 2015. After a post-pandemic hiatus, the band was invited again to perform in the 2025 London New Year's Day Parade.

In 2015 the Science Olympiad team won first place and moved onto to represent Arizona in the national competition in Lincoln, Nebraska.

The DMHS FIRST Tech Challenge, Team 1852 “Amore” was active between the years 2004-2012. They attended the FIRST Championships in Atlanta in 2009.

The DMHS FIRST Robotics Competition, Team 6314 "DM Robotics The WolfPack" restarted in 2016, and with a successful rookie season, made it all the way to the FIRST Championships in Houston, TX in 2017 and won the Carver Subdivision, where their alliance ranked 3rd overall at the World Championships. In 2018, the team won the Regional Chairman's Award at the Arizona North Regional, the most prestigious award in FIRST, and competed again at the World Championships in Houston, TX.

== Athletics ==
DMHS is a member of the Arizona Interscholastic Association. Although it has won many minor titles in high school athletics, its first major state title was earned in 2007 when the boys' basketball team became 5A-II state champions by defeating Paradise Valley High School 65-55. In 2010, the girls' soccer team won a 5A-II championship title. They defeated Horizon High School, after 3 OTs and winning 5 to 4 in PKs. The 2006 girls' volleyball team also won the 2006 state championship. Desert Mountain students won eight varsity team championships and twelve individual state championships in 2007.

The DMHS Tennis team won AIA Division I State titles in the 2014-2015 season and one the following year in the 2015-2016 season, over Brophy and Chaparral, respectively.

The Wolves won state baseball championships in 2013 and 2021.

DMHS Softball won the 5A State Championship in 2023, 2024 and 2025.

== Media ==
In 2006, the school was featured in an episode of the MTV program My Super Sweet 16.

== Notable alumni ==
- Kyle Allen (2014), NFL quarterback for the Detroit Lions
- Mark Andrews (2014), NFL tight end for the Baltimore Ravens
- Alec Benjamin (2012), american singer-songwriter
- Peter Bourjos (2005, transferred), baseball player, attended for his freshman year, transferred to Notre Dame Prep
- Dylan Cozens, former baseball player for the Philadelphia Phillies, transferred out in his junior year
- Austin Davis (2011), baseball player for the Boston Red Sox
- Tyeler Davison (2010), professional NFL player
- Hadas Gold (2006), journalist
- Lauren Gottlieb (2006), TV dancer and contemporary Bollywood actress
- Merrill Kelly (2007), MLB pitcher for the Arizona Diamondbacks
- Michael Longfellow (2012) actor, writer, comedian and performer on Saturday Night Live.
- Arie Luyendyk Jr. (2000), auto racing driver, who was on season 22 of The Bachelor
- Heather Morris (2005), actress who played Brittany S. Pierce on Glee
- Brayden Narveson (2018), NFL placekicker for the Tennessee Titans
- Kedon Slovis (2019), NFL quarterback for the Indianapolis Colts and Arizona Cardinals
- Nathan Westling (2014), professional fashion model for Marc Jacobs and Prada
