= Jewish Sports Review =

Magazine focused on Jewish athletes

- Editors: Ephraim Moxson; Shel Wallman
- Staff writers: Neil Keller; Stan Ramati
- Categories: Jewish Sports
- Frequency: Bi-monthly
- Publisher: Ephraim Moxson; Shel Wallman
- First issue: May–June 1997
- Country: U.S.
- Based in: Los Angeles
- Website: www.jewishsportsreview.com

Jewish Sports Review (JSR) was a bi-monthly magazine that operated from 1997 to 2022. Its editors were Ephraim Moxson and Shel Wallman.

The magazine identified Jewish athletes, including professionals, college players, athletes in international competition, and selected high school athletes.

== History ==
From 1972 to 1974, Shel Wallman published an early version of what became the Jewish Sports Review, then for 20 years in his weekly column for a Jewish newspaper in Indianapolis. Wallman placed an ad in The Sporting News and connected with Ephraim Moxson, who became a stringer for Wallman.

Wallman and Moxson relaunched the Jewish Sports Review as a print-only, biweekly magazine focused on identifying Jewish athletes from college through professional sports in 1997.

As to his inspiration for launching the magazine, Wallman said: "I was always curious to know who was Jewish as a kid. And there wasn't a list."

Jewish Sports Review ceased publication on September 16, 2022.

== Content ==
The magazine rarely included in-depth profiles of the athletes or used photos. JSR provided information as to who is Jewish in the sports world. JSR's criteria for determining an athlete as Jewish was: at least one parent is Jewish, he did not practice any other religion during his athletic career, and he self-identifies as ethnically Jewish. If an athlete has a Jewish parent but was raised in, or converted to, another faith, or indicated to JSR that he did not wish to be considered Jewish, he is excluded (even though under Jewish law he might be considered Jewish). Athletes were asked whether or not they wish to be identified as Jewish before they were included in the Review. JSR also listed athletes frequently misidentified as Jewish.

== Reception ==
When the American Jewish Historical Society published a set of baseball cards of Jews in the major leagues, the project founder, Martin Abramowitz of Jewish Major Leaguers Inc., relied on research by JSR. Also, when the Israel Baseball League was active, teams in it would recruit top college baseball players from the JSR's Jewish All-Americans in NCAA Divisions I, II, and III.

Peter Horvitz, in The Big Book of Jewish Sports Heroes (2007), calls Wallman the "best and most dependable source of up-to-date information on the subject" of Jews in sports. Joseph Siegman, in his 2005 book Jewish Sports Legends, listed Moxson as a distinguished authority on sports. The New York Times reported that JSR "aims to be rigorously comprehensive", and Sports Illustrated called JSR "tireless in its service mission".

In 2023, Wallman and Moxson were honored with the International Jewish Sports Hall of Fame award of excellence.

== See also ==
- List of Jews in sports
